= Santo Domingo de la Calzada Cathedral =

Roman Catholic cathedral in La Rioja, Spain

Coordinates: 42°26′31″N 2°57′09″W

- Catedral de Santo Domingo de la Calzada (Spanish)
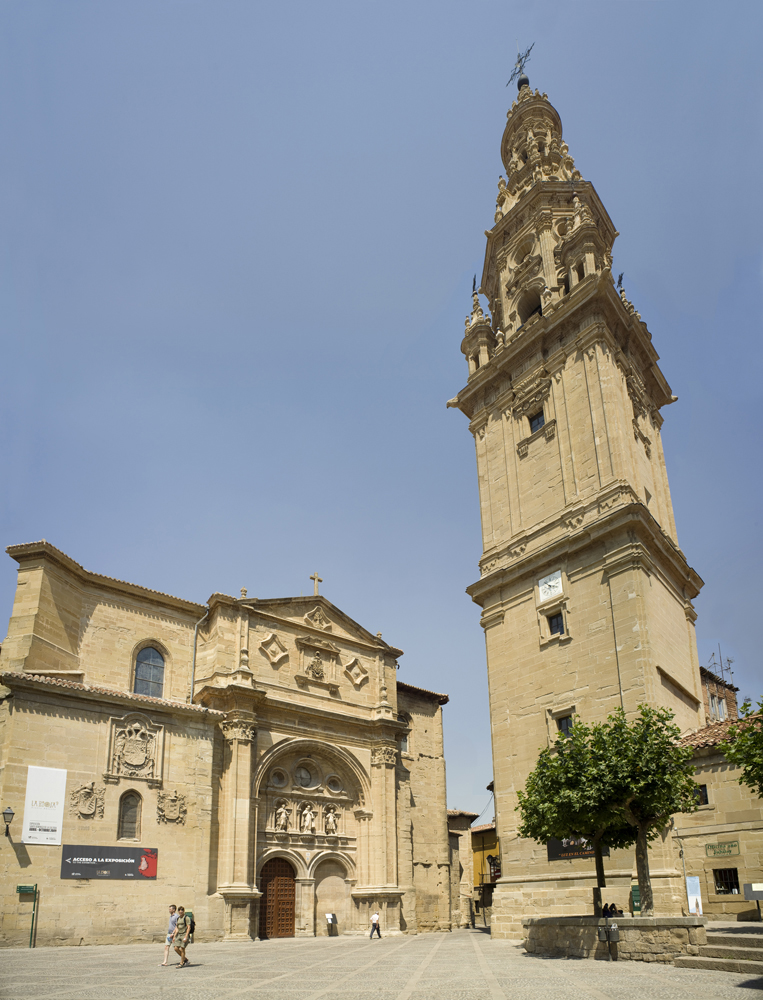
- Portico and freestanding tower

- Location within Spain
- Location: Santo Domingo de la Calzada, Spain

Site notes
- Governing body: Roman Catholic Church

Spanish Cultural Heritage
- Type: Non-movable
- Criteria: Monument
- Designated: 1931

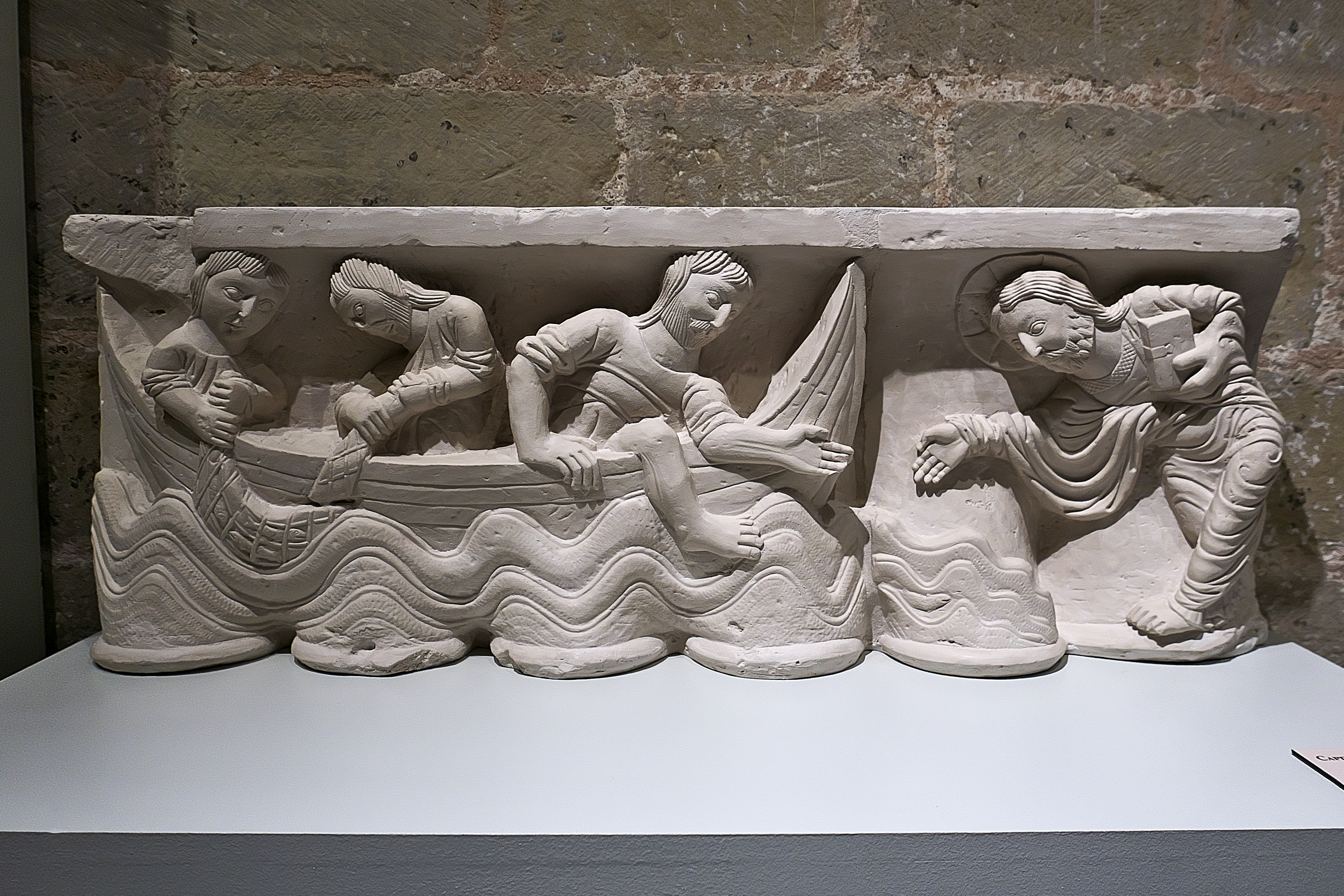
Capital with the miraculous catch of fish

The Cathedral of Santo Domingo de la Calzada is a Roman Catholic cathedral in the village of Santo Domingo de la Calzada in La Rioja, Spain. It is dedicated to the Saviour and St Mary.

== History ==
Santo Domingo de la Calzada is on the Camino de Santiago. The town is named after Saint Dominic de la Calzada, who aided the pilgrims travelling through the district. Dominic died in 1109. He was buried in the village church, which became a collegiate church later in the 12th century and was rebuilt on a more ambitious scale. The building was raised to cathedral status in the 13th century.

It is currently one of the cathedrals belonging to the Roman Catholic Diocese of Calahorra y La Calzada-Logroño, the others being at Calahorra and Logrono

== Sculpture ==
The cathedral's facade contains statues of Emeterius and Celedonius, saints associated with Calahorra.

The retable was sculpted in 1537-40 by Damián Forment in the Renaissance style. In the 20th century it was moved from the East end of the church.

== Chickens ==
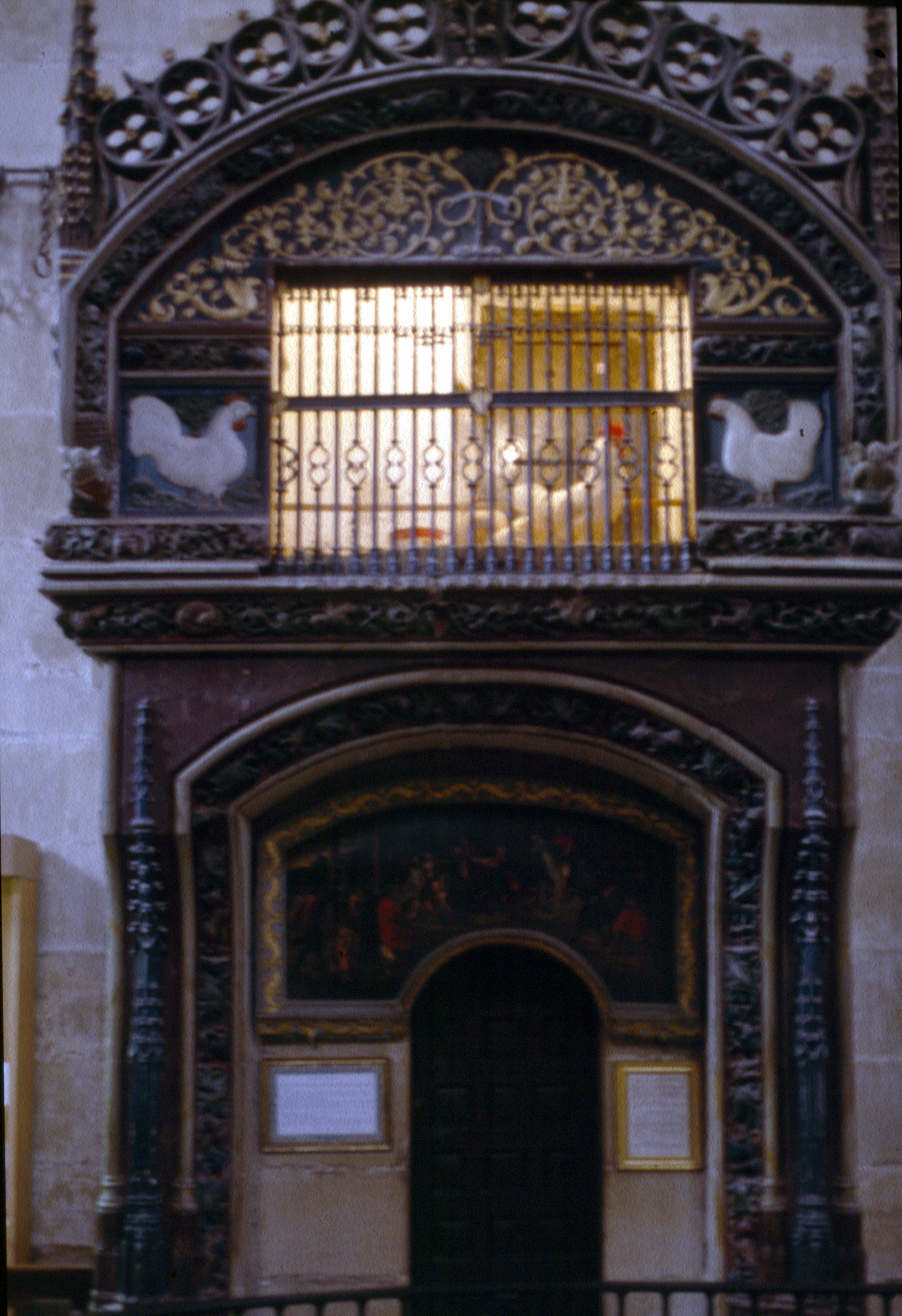
Henhouse

A miracle is attributed to Dominic according to which two beheaded cooked chickens resurrected to testify in favor of a pilgrim wrongly accused of theft. A pair of descendants of the chickens are kept at all times in the choir loft of the cathedral. Other descendants are kept in the local pilgrimage refuge. A similar miracle is said of the rooster of Barcelos in Portugal.

== Conservation ==
The Camino de Santiago is designated a serial World Heritage Site by UNESCO.
