= Dominic de la Calzada =

Spanish saint (1019–1109)

Saint Dominic de la Calzada
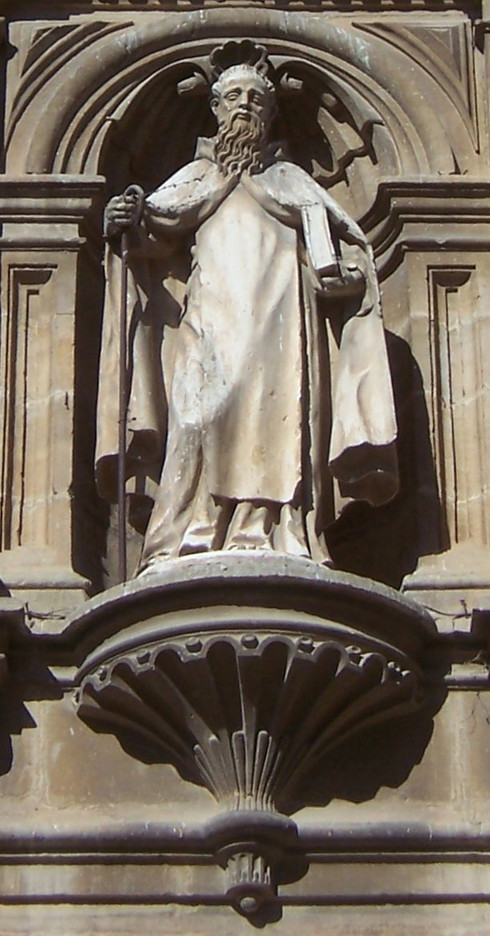
- Statue of Dominic de la Calzada, Cathedral of Santo Domingo de la Calzada.
- Born: 1019; Viloria de Rioja, Spain
- Died: 12 May 1109 (aged 89–90); Santo Domingo de la Calzada, Spain
- Venerated in: Catholic Church
- Major shrine: Cathedral of Santo Domingo de la Calzada
- Feast: May 12
- Attributes: hen and rooster, monastic habit, prayer beads, shepherd's crook
- Patronage: civil engineers

Dominic de la Calzada (or Dominic of the Causeway) (Spanish: Santo Domingo de la Calzada) (1019 – 12 May 1109) was a saint from a cottage in Burgos very close to La Rioja.

== Life ==
Born Domingo García in Viloria de Rioja, he was the son of a peasant named Ximeno García. His mother was named Orodulce. A shepherd, he tried to join the Benedictine order first at Valvanera and then at San Millán de la Cogolla, but was turned away. He then became a hermit in the forests near Ayuela, near the present-day town of Santo Domingo de la Calzada, until 1039.

In 1039, he began working with Gregory IV of Ostia (Gregorio), bishop of Ostia, who had been sent to Calahorra as a papal envoy to combat a plague of locusts that afflicted Navarre and La Rioja.

Gregory ordained Dominic a priest. Together they built a wooden bridge over the Oja River to help pilgrims on the Way of St. James. Gregory died in 1044, and Dominic returned to Ayuela, where he began developing the area. He cleared trees, cultivated the earth, and began to build a paved causeway (in Spanish, calzada), which served as an alternate route to the traditional Roman causeway between Logroño and Burgos. Dominic's causeway became the principal route between Nájera and Redecilla del Camino.

Dominic was joined in this work by Juan de Ortega. To better the conditions of the pilgrims that began to use his new causeway, he replaced the wooden bridge that he had built with Gregory with one made of stone, and constructed on the site of an old fort, a building that served as a hospice for travelers. Today, it is the Casa del Santo, which is a used as a hostel by modern-day pilgrims.

The town of Santo Domingo de la Calzada began as a few houses built around the hermitage of the saint in his lifetime. At this death in 1109, the village had grown in population. Alfonso VI of Castile annexed La Rioja in 1076 and seeing that Dominic's efforts contributed to the Castilianization of the region, decided to support him and his projects. He visited Dominic in 1090 and thereafter Dominic, assisted by his follower Juan de Ortega, began construction on a church dedicated to Christ and the Virgin Mary. This was consecrated by the bishop of Calahorra in 1106.

Dominic died in 1109. His church, later the Cathedral of Santo Domingo de la Calzada, was where he was buried, and it was elevated to the rank of cathedral after being placed in the jurisdiction of the Diocese of Calahorra in the 1230s.

Due to the development of his public works projects he is the Patron Saint of the Spanish Civil Engineers.

== Miracles ==
Miracles are attributed to Dominic, among them the healing of a French knight who had been possessed by the devil and who was freed of his affliction by visiting the sepulcher of Dominic. Another concerns the healing of a German pilgrim named Bernard in the fifteenth century, who was cured of an affliction of the eyes by visiting Dominic's tomb. Another concerns the healing of a blind Norman who was cured when he visited the cathedral.

== Legend ==
The most famous miracle, however, concerns that of the rooster and the chicken, which is said to have taken place at Santo Domingo de la Calzada. The story goes that in the 14th century, a German 18-year-old named Hugonell, from Xanten, goes on pilgrimage to Santiago de Compostela with his parents. A Spanish girl at the hostel where they were staying makes sexual advances toward Hugonell; Hugonell rejects her advances. Angry at this, the girl hides a silver cup in the German's bag and then informs the authorities that the youth had taken it. Hugonell is sentenced to the gallows, in accordance with the laws of Alfonso X of Castile.

The parents sadly decide to examine their son's body, still hanging on the gallows, but suddenly hear his voice –he tells them that Saint Dominic has saved his life. His parents quickly make their way to see the magistrate. The magistrate, who is at the time eating dinner, remarks: "Your son is as alive as this rooster and chicken that I was feasting on before you interrupted me." And in that moment, the two birds jump from the plate and begin to sing and crow happily.

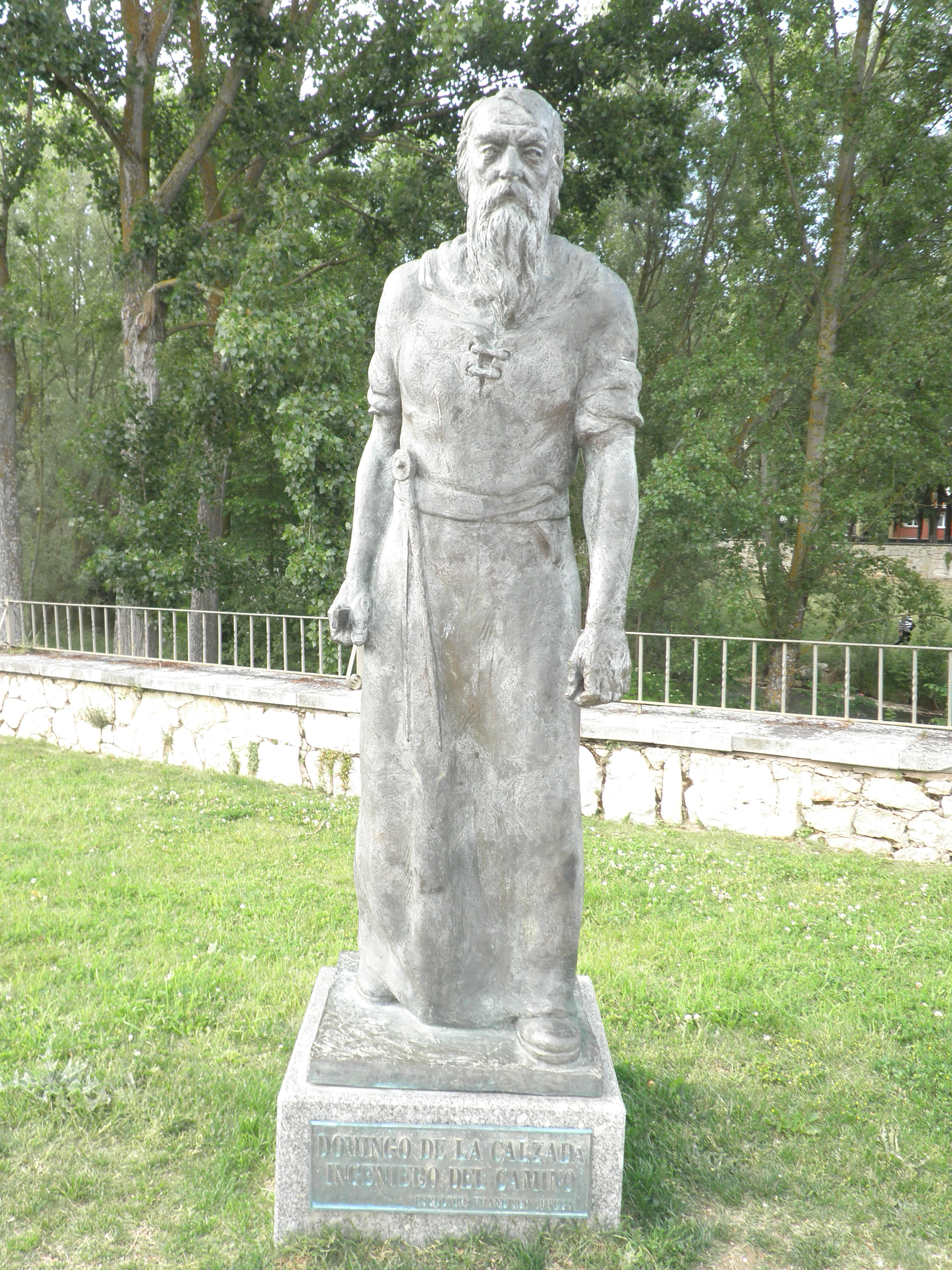
Statue of Dominic de la Calzada in Burgos.

=== Analysis of the story ===
The first element of the tale, that of a hanged pilgrim, is found in many collections of miracles, with the salvation from death of the victim attributed to not only Dominic, but also to Saint James the Great, or to the Virgin Mary, with the story taking place in various cities such as Barcelos, Portugal. Versions of the tale are found in the Milagros de Nuestra Señora by Gonzalo de Berceo (Miracle No. 6), the 175th Cantiga de Santa María by Alfonso X, and in the Codex Calixtinus.

The second part of the tale, the miracle of the dancing roasted chicken and rooster, is unique to Santo Domingo de la Calzada, although a very similar story appears in the English carol "King Herod and the Cock", and related notions can also be found in folklore concerning the mythical land of Cockaigne, "where grilled geese fly directly into one's mouth".

== Veneration ==
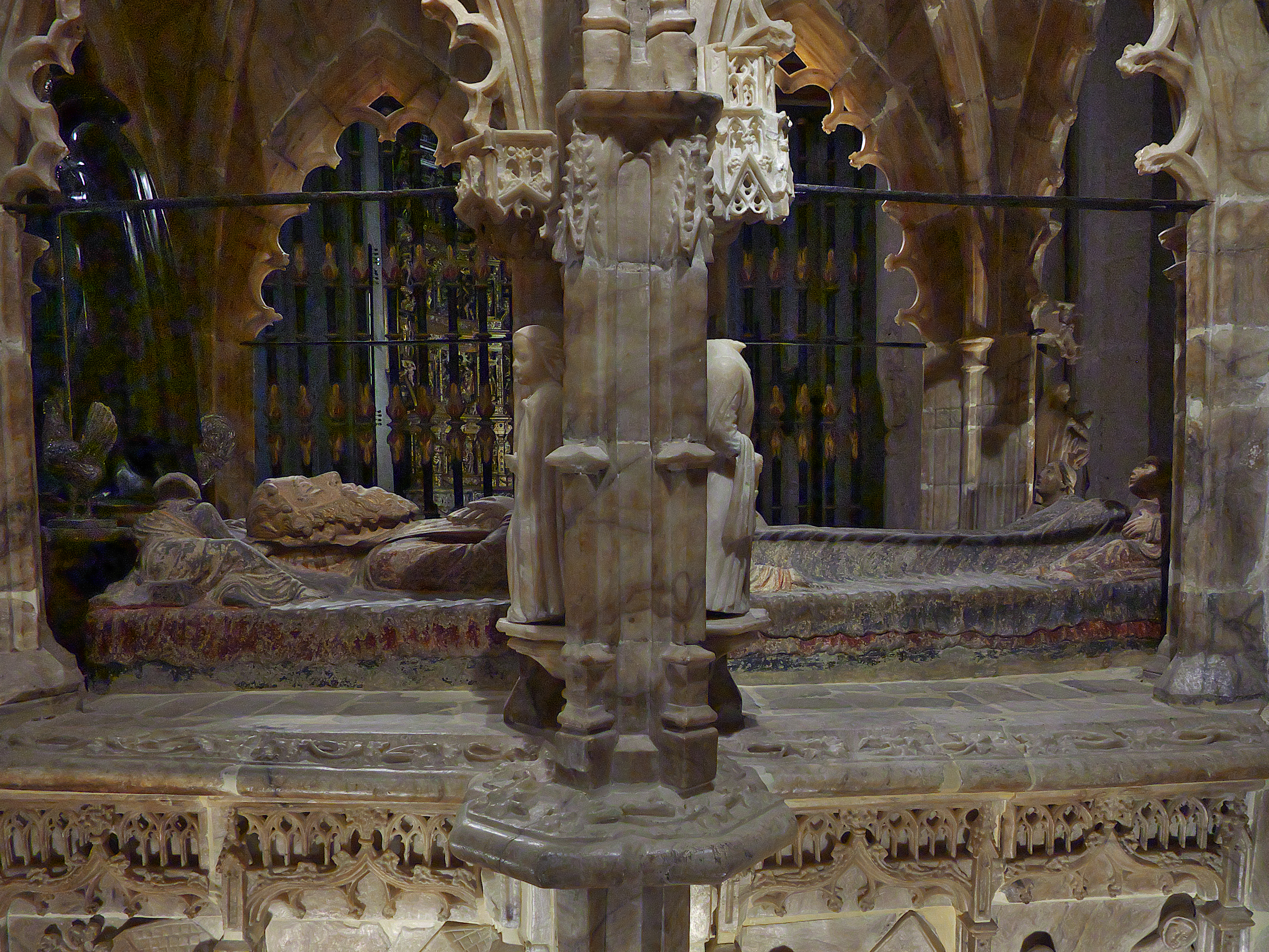
Tomb of Dominic de la Calzada.

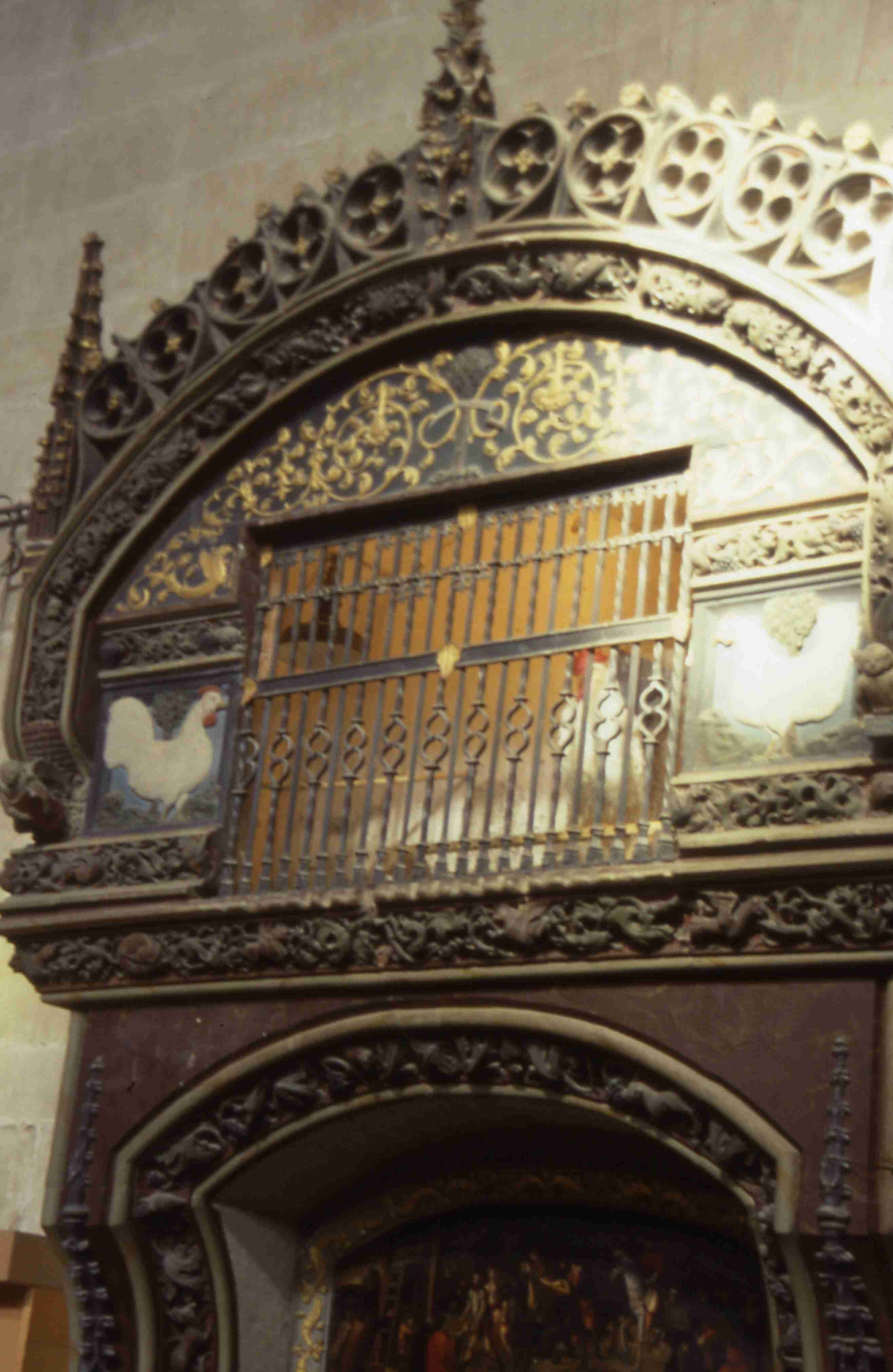
The rooster is visible behind the bars of its ornate coop.

In memory of Dominic's miracle, a rooster and chicken, with white feathers, are kept alive at the cathedral all year round. A different rooster and chicken are switched each month, although they are called descendants of the original birds who miraculously danced even though roasted. The pairs of roosters and chickens, when they are not at the cathedral, are kept in a chicken coop called the Gallinero de Santo Domingo de la Calzada, which the Cofradía de Santo Domingo (Confraternity of Santo Domingo) maintains with the help of donations. A wayside shrine (hornacina) built in 1445 holds a relic associated with the miracle: a piece of wood from the gallows from which Hugonell was hanged.

Medieval pilgrims gathered the feathers of these favored birds, or got them from the priest, and would affix them to their hats. Another tradition claimed that if the birds ate breadcrumbs directly from the end of the pilgrim's staff, that pilgrim would arrive safely in Compostela.

The German pilgrim Hermann Künig (15th century) claimed to have seen the room where the roasted birds began to sing and dance; other documents written by pilgrims state that Hugonell's shirt as well as the gallows had been conserved by the church of Santo Domingo. These artifacts are now lost.

A verse commemorating this miracle runs: "Santo Domingo de la Calzada / Donde cantó la gallina después de asada" ("Santo Domingo de la Calzada / Where a chicken sang after being roasted").

Chicken-shaped pastries called "milagros del santo" ("miracles of the saint") are widely available in the town of Santo Domingo de la Calzada, also in commemoration of the miracle.
