= Murillo de Calahorra =

- Ghost town
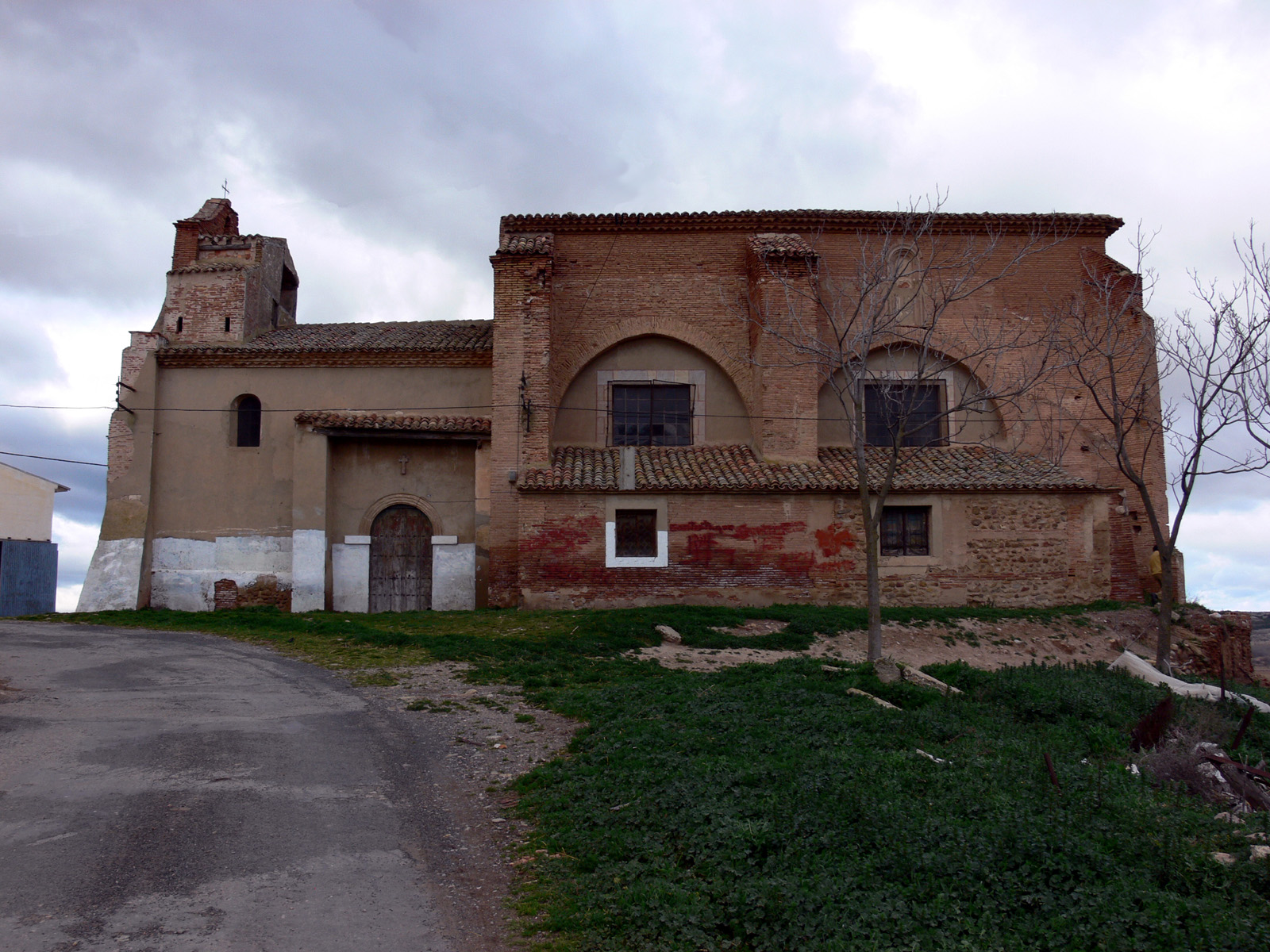
- Church of Mary

- Location within La Rioja, Spain Location within Spain
- Coordinates: 42°20′13″N 1°59′38″W
- Country: Spain
- Autonomous community: La Rioja
- Comarca: Calahorra
- Postal code: 26500

Murillo de Calahorra is a ghost town in the municipality of Calahorra, in the province and autonomous community of La Rioja, Spain.
