= San Juan de Ortega =

Monastery in Burgos, Spain

Coordinates: 42°23′N 03°27′W

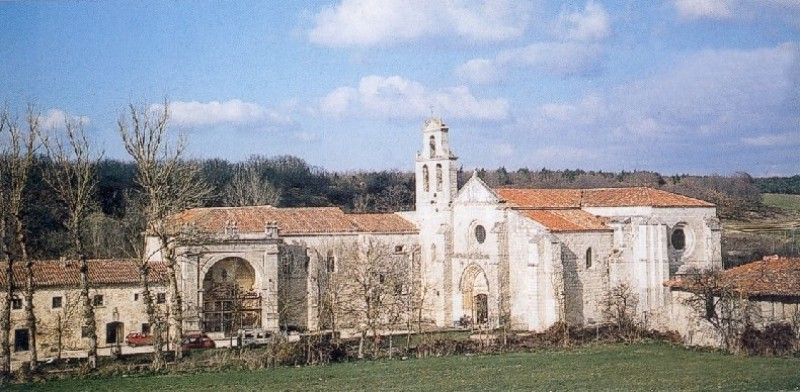
Exterior view of San Juan de Ortega.

The old monastery of San Juan de Ortega is a Romanesque monument in Barrios de Colina, in the province of Burgos, Spain.

== History ==
Located on the old Camiño Francés, it is commonly believed that the monastery was built by Saint John of Ortega himself, with the help of his friend and fellow saint, Domingo de la Calzada, around 1142 as a help point to the pilgrims who walked to Santiago de Compostela along the Way of Saint James. The monastery was originally staffed by a community of Augustinian canons.

The monastery belonged to the Order of Los Jerónimos from 1432 until the 1835, when the monastery was disbanded. During their tenure, the monks developed a pharmacy known throughout the area. In the sixteenth century, the hospice had room for sixteen beds. At one time a welcomed refuge for pilgrims, over time the area declined and the monastery was abandoned in the nineteenth century, with the local farmers using the church as a barn for hay.

The hamlet is very small and sparsely inhabited. With the increase in pilgrims along the Camino since the 1980s, the former monastery has undergone some gradual restoration. A portion of the premises has been fitted out as a albergue with fifty beds. The monastery has a café where pilgrims can rest and eat.

== Architecture ==
The church is an example of late Romanesque art, constructed during the 12th and 13th centuries. The oldest part of the church is the three twelfth century apses, built either by or under the direction of St John. Isabella I of Castile had Juan de Colonia, architect of Burgos Cathedral, add Gothic arches in the fifteenth century. She also financed construction of the Chapel of St Nicholas.

The illustrated capitals deserve special mention, as well as the tomb of the Saint, in the crypt.

=== Equinox ===
Every year on the equinox in March and September there is a phenomenon involving light which penetrates through a small window placed in the main façade. At 5 pm (solar time) a small beam of light illuminates the Annunciation of the Virgin Mary, sculpted in stone in the top of a pillar.
