= Diocese of Calahorra y La Calzada-Logroño =

Roman Catholic diocese in Spain

Coordinates: 42.2989°N 1.9575°W

Diocese of Calahorra y La Calzada-Logroño Dioecesis Calaguritanus et Calceatensis – Lucroniensis Diócesis de Calahorra y La Calzada-Logroño

Catholic
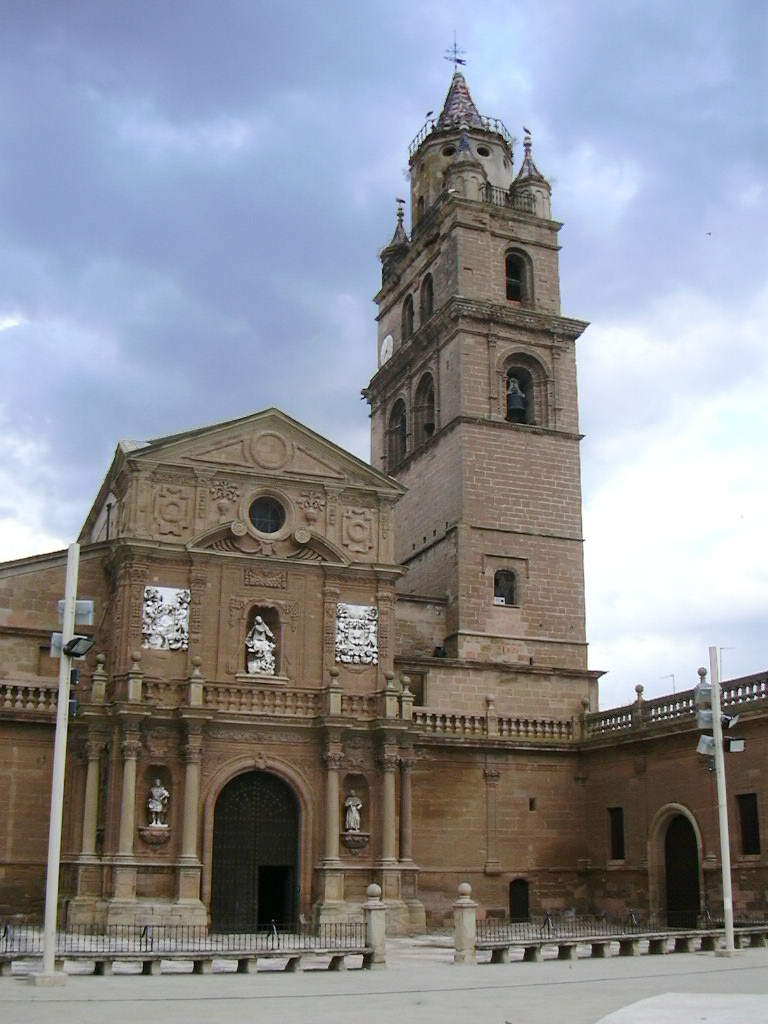
- Calahorra Cathedral

Location
- Country: Spain
- Ecclesiastical province: Pamplona y Tudela
- Metropolitan: Pamplona y Tudela

Statistics
- Area: 5,033 km^{2} (1,943 sq mi)
- Population: Total; Catholics: (as of 2006); 301,084; 273,101 (90.7%)

Information
- Rite: Latin Rite
- Established: 5th Century (As Diocese of Calahorra); 1232 (As Diocese of Calahorra y La Calzada); 9 March 1959 (As Diocese of Calahorra y La Calzada-Logroño)
- Cathedral: Cathedral of the Assumption of Our Lady in Calahorra; Cathedral of the Saviour and St Mary in Santo Domingo de la Calzada
- Co-cathedral: Co-Cathedral of St Mary in Logroño

Current leadership
- Pope: Leo XIV
- Bishop elect: Santos Montoya Torres
- Metropolitan Archbishop: Francisco Pérez González

Website
- Website of the Diocese

The Diocese of Calahorra and La Calzada-Logroño (Latin: Dioecesis Calaguritanus et Calceatensis – Lucroniensis )) is a Latin diocese of the Catholic Church located in the cities of Calahorra, Santo Domingo de la Calzada, and Logroño in the ecclesiastical province of Pamplona y Tudela in Spain.

There are cathedrals in Calahorra, Santo Domingo de la Calzada and Logroño.

== Names ==
In 463, the Diocese of Calahorra was established. In 1232, "y La Calzada" was added. It became the Diocese of Calahorra y La Calzada – Logroño on 9 March 1959.

== Bishops ==
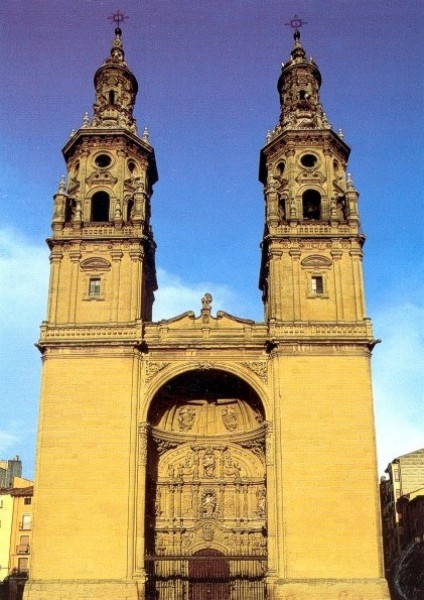
Concatedral de Santa María de la Redonda

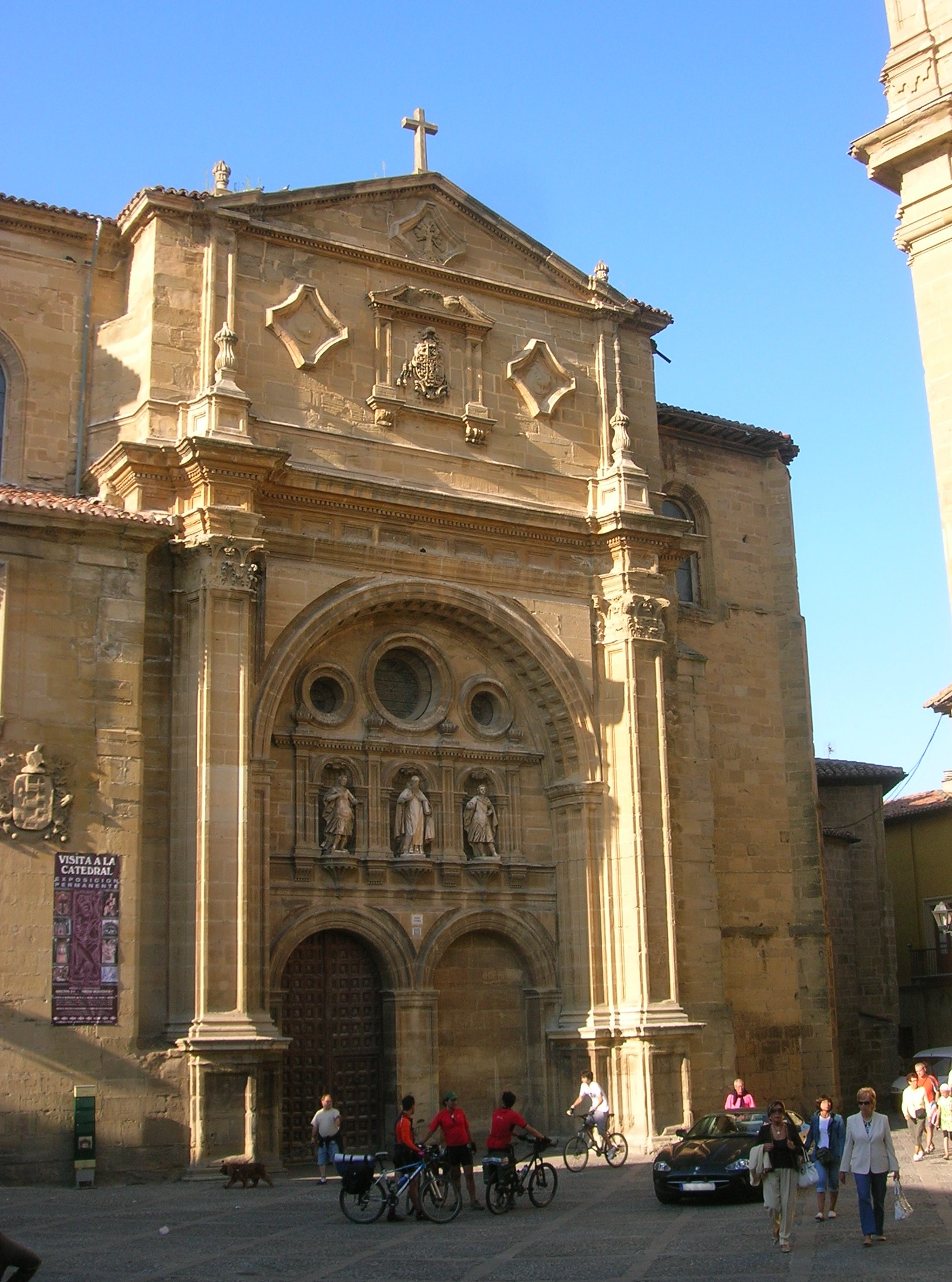
Santo Domingo de la Calzada Cathedral

=== To 1453 ===
- Rodrigo de Cascante (1170–1190)
- Bishop García (1190–?)
- Juan de Préjano (1197–1202)
- Juan García de Agoncilo (1207–1216)
- Guillermo Durán y Rodrigo de Basín (1217–1221)
- Juan Pérez (1226 Appointed – 1237 Died)
- Jerónimo Aznar (1238–1263)
- Vivián (1263–1273)
- Esteban de Sepúlveda (1273–1280)
- Rodrigo Jiménez (1281–1282)
- Martín García (1283–1286) Appointed Bishop of Astorga
- Bishop Blas (1286–1287)
- Juan Almoravid (5 Jan 1287 – 9 Jun 1300) Appointed Archbishop of Sevilla
- Fernando González (13 Jun 1300 – 6 May 1303)
- Rodrigo Ordóñez (1304–1311)
- Miguel Romero de Yanguas (1313–1325)
- Juan de Santo Domingo (1326–1346)
- Pedro (1346–1347)
- Lope de Fontecha (1348–1351)
- Fernando Manuel (1352–1362)
- Robert Le Coq (1362–1373)
- Gonzalo Mena Roelas (16 Nov 1373 – 11 Aug 1382) Appointed Bishop of Burgos
- Juan de Villacreces (1382–1394)
- Juan Ramírez de Guzmán (1394 Jan 28 – 1403 Jul 30) Appointed Bishop of Avila
- Fernando Manuel (1403–1408)
- Diego López de Zúñiga (1408–1443)
- Pedro López de Miranda (1443–1453)

=== 1453–1953 ===
- Pedro González de Mendoza (28 Nov 1453 – 30 Oct 1467 Appointed, Bishop of Sigüenza)
- Rodrigo Sánchez de Arévalo (1468–1469) Appointed Bishop of Palencia
- Juan Diaz de Coca (13 Feb 1470 – 12 Mar 1477 Died)
- Pedro Aranda (1477 – 1494 Died)
- Juan Ortega Bravo de la Laguna (6 Sep 1499 – 5 May 1503 Appointed, Bishop of Coria)
- Fadrique de Portugal Noreña, O.S.B. (5 May 1503 – 22 Dec 1508 Appointed, Bishop of Segovia)
- Juan Fernández Velasco (22 Dec 1505 – 22 Jul 1514 Appointed, Bishop of Palencia)
- Jaime Serra i Cau (5 Jul 1514 – 25 May 1515 Resigned)
- Juan Castellanos de Villalba (25 May 1515 – 23 Aug 1522 Died)
- Alonso de Castilla Zúniga (11 Mar 1523 – 8 Feb 1541 Died)
- Antonio Ramírez de Haro (27 Jun 1541 – 6 Aug 1543 Appointed, Bishop of Segovia)
- Juan Yanes (24 Sep 1543 – 24 Dec 1544 Died)
- Juan Bernal Díaz de Luco (17 Apr 1545 – 6 Sep 1556 Died)
- Diego Fernández de Córdoba Velasco (1 Oct 1557 – 15 Sep 1558 Died)
- Juan Quiñones Guzmán (2 Aug 1559 – 14 Sep 1576 Died)
- Juan Ochoa Salazar (11 Sep 1577 – 7 Aug 1587 Appointed, Bishop of Plasencia)
- Antonio Manrique, O.F.M. (7 Aug 1587 – 30 Jan 1589 Died)
- Pedro Portocarrero (bishop, died 1600) (20 Mar 1589 – 12 Jan 1594 Appointed, Bishop of Córdoba)
- Pedro Manso de Zuñiga y Medrano (23 Mar 1594 – 12 Sep 1612 Died)
- Pedro Zamora (29 Jul 1613 – 4 Oct 1613 Died)
- Pedro González del Castillo (17 Feb 1614 – 5 Aug 1627 Died)
- Miguel Ayala (5 May 1628 – 19 Aug 1632 Died)
- Gonzalo Chacón Velasco y Fajardo (31 Jan 1633 – 27 May 1642 Died)
- Juan Piñeiro Osorio (13 Jul 1643 – 21 Oct 1647 Appointed, Bishop of Pamplona)
- Juan Juániz de Echalar (16 Dec 1647 – 13 Oct 1656 Died)
- Martín López de Hontiveros (18 Jun 1657 – 30 Sep 1658 Confirmed, Archbishop of Valencia)
- Fernando Heras Manrique (2 Dec 1658 – 1659 Died)
- Bernardo de Hontiveros, O.S.B. (9 Jun 1659 – 3 Nov 1662 Died)
- José de la Peña García de Ceniceros (27 Aug 1663 – 23 May 1667 Died)
- Francisco Rodríguez Castañón (12 Dec 1667 – 1669 Died)
- Gabriel de Esparza Pérez (2 Jun 1670 – 10 Jan 1686 Died)
- Pedro de Lepe Orantes (Lope y Dorantes) (12 Aug 1686 – 5 Dec 1700 Died)
- Francisco Antonio de Borja-Centelles y Ponce de Léon (18 Jul 1701 – 3 Apr 1702 Appointed, Archbishop of Burgos)
- Ildefonso de Mena y Borja (8 May 1702 – 4 Oct 1714 Died)
- Antonio Horcasitas y Avellaneda (18 Mar 1715 – 21 Dec 1716 Died)
- José Espejo y Cisneros (2 Jul 1717 – 8 Apr 1747 Retired)
- Diego Rojas y Contreras (6 May 1748 – 12 Mar 1753 Appointed, Bishop of Cartagena (en España))
- Andrés Porras y Termes (26 Sep 1753 – 16 Jun 1764 Died)
- Juan Luengo Pinto (17 Dec 1764 – 17 Apr 1784 Died)
- Pedro Luis Ozta Múzquiz (27 Jun 1785 – 20 Jan 1789 Died)
- Francisco Mateo Aguiriano Gómez † (29 Mar 1790 – 21 Sep 1813 Died)
- Atanasio Puyal y Poveda (26 Sep 1814 – 21 Oct 1827 Died)
- Ignacio Ribes Mayor (15 Dec 1828 – 24 Feb 1832 Confirmed, Archbishop of Burgos)
- Pablo García Abella, C.O. (15 Apr 1833 – 17 Jan 1848 Confirmed, Archbishop of Valencia)
- Gaspar Cos y Soberón (3 Jul 1848 – 15 Dec 1848 Died)
- Miguel José Irigoyen (20 May 1850 – 18 Feb 1852 Died)
- Cipriano Juárez y Berzosa (27 Sep 1852 – 23 May 1858 Died)
- Antolín Monescillo y Viso (22 Jul 1861 – 27 Mar 1865 Confirmed, Bishop of Jaén)
- Fabián Sebastián Arenzana y Magdaleno (25 Sep 1865 – 9 Nov 1874 Died)
- Gabino Catalina y del Amo (5 Jul 1875 – 11 Jan 1882 Died)
- Antonio María Cascajares y Azara (27 Mar 1884 – 17 Dec 1891 Confirmed, Archbishop of Valladolid)
- Fidel García Martínez (25 Aug 1927 – 7 May 1953 Resigned)

=== Since 1953 ===
- Abilio del Campo y de la Bárcena (7 May 1953 – 20 December 1976 Resigned)
- Francisco Álvarez Martínez (20 December 1976 – 12 May 1989 Appointed, Bishop of Orihuela-Alicante)
- Ramón Búa Otero (14 September 1989 – 15 September 2003 Resigned)
- Juan José Omella Omella (8 April 2004 – 6 November 2015 Appointed, Archbishop of Barcelona)
- Carlos Manuel Escribano Subías (13 May 2016 – 6 October 2020 Appointed, Archbishop of Zaragoza)
- Santos Montoya Torres (12 January 2022 – present)

=== Auxiliary ===
- Cristóforo Chrisostome Carletti, O.F.M. (1624–1627)
- Abilio del Campo y de la Bárcena (29 Oct 1952 – 7 May 1953, Appointed Bishop of Calahorra y La Calzada)

== See also ==
- Roman Catholicism in Spain
