= Francisco Borgia =

Francisco Borgia may refer to following members of the Borgia family:

- Francis Borgia, 4th Duke of Gandía, a Spanish nobleman and catholic saint
- Francisco de Borja, a Spanish cardinal
- Francisco de Borja y Aragón, a Spanish writer and official
- Francisco Antonio de Borja-Centelles y Ponce de Léon, a Spanish cardinal
- Francisco Galcerán de Lloris y de Borja, an unconsecrated Spanish cardinal
