= Viloria de Rioja =

Coordinates: 42°26′N 3°06′W

Viloria de Rioja, Spain
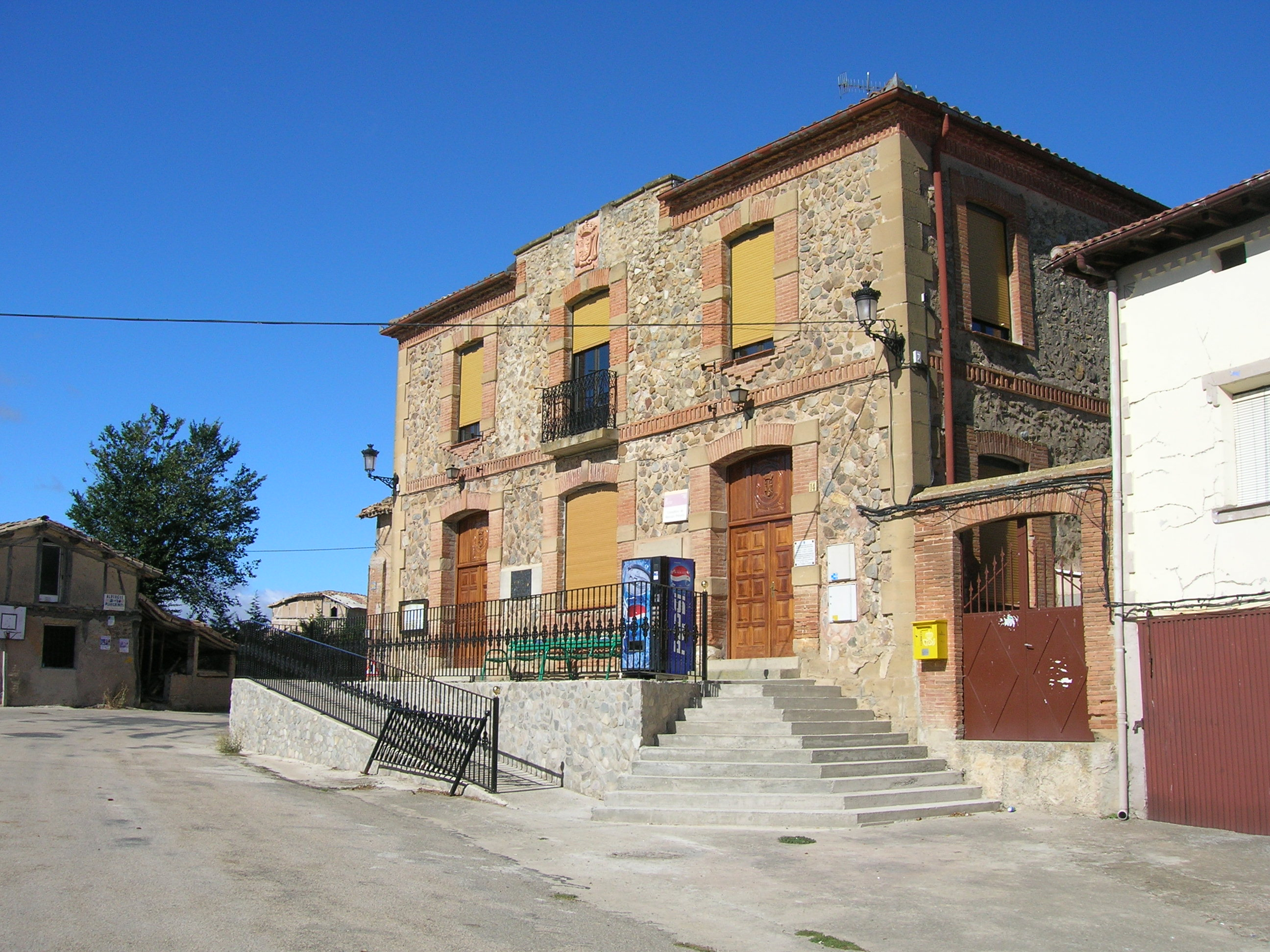
- An ancient building of Viloria de Rioja, Burgos, Spain

- Coat of arms
- Interactive map of Viloria de Rioja, Spain
- Country: Spain
- Autonomous community: Castile and León
- Province: Burgos
- Municipality: Viloria de Rioja

Area
  - Total: 7 km^{2} (2.7 sq mi)

Population (2025-01-01)
  - Total: 38
  - Density: 5.4/km^{2} (14/sq mi)
- Time zone: UTC+1 (CET)
  - Summer (DST): UTC+2 (CEST)

Viloria de Rioja is a municipality located in the province of Burgos, Castile and León, Spain. According to the 2014 census (INE), the municipality has a population of 41 inhabitants. It was the birthplace of Saint Dominic de la Calzada, in 1019.
