= Barrios de Colina =

Coordinates: 42°24′N 3°27′W

- Municipality and town
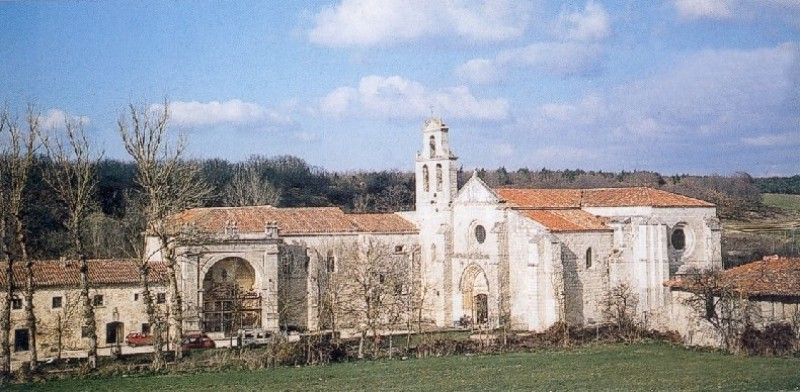
- San Juan de Ortega monastery (12th-15th century)

- Flag Coat of arms

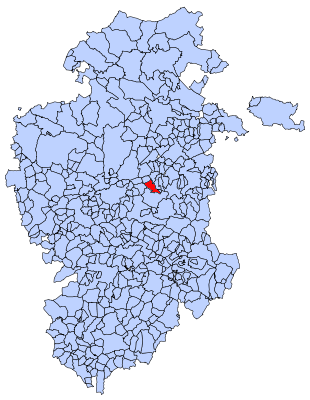
- Municipal location of Barrios de Colina in Burgos province
- Country: Spain
- Autonomous community: Castile and León
- Province: Burgos
- Comarca: Alfoz de Burgos

Area
  - Total: 24 km^{2} (9.3 sq mi)
- Elevation: 969 m (3,179 ft)

Population (2025-01-01)
  - Total: 55
  - Density: 2.3/km^{2} (5.9/sq mi)
- Time zone: UTC+1 (CET)
  - Summer (DST): UTC+2 (CEST)
- Postal code: 09199
- Website: http://www.barriosdecolina.es/

Barrios de Colina is a municipality and town located in the province of Burgos, Castile and León, Spain. According to the 2004 census (INE), the municipality has a population of 76 inhabitants.

The municipality of Barrios de Colina is made up of three towns: Barrios de Colina (seat or capital), Hiniestra and San Juan de Ortega.
