= Rooster of Barcelos =

Portuguese folk tale and symbol

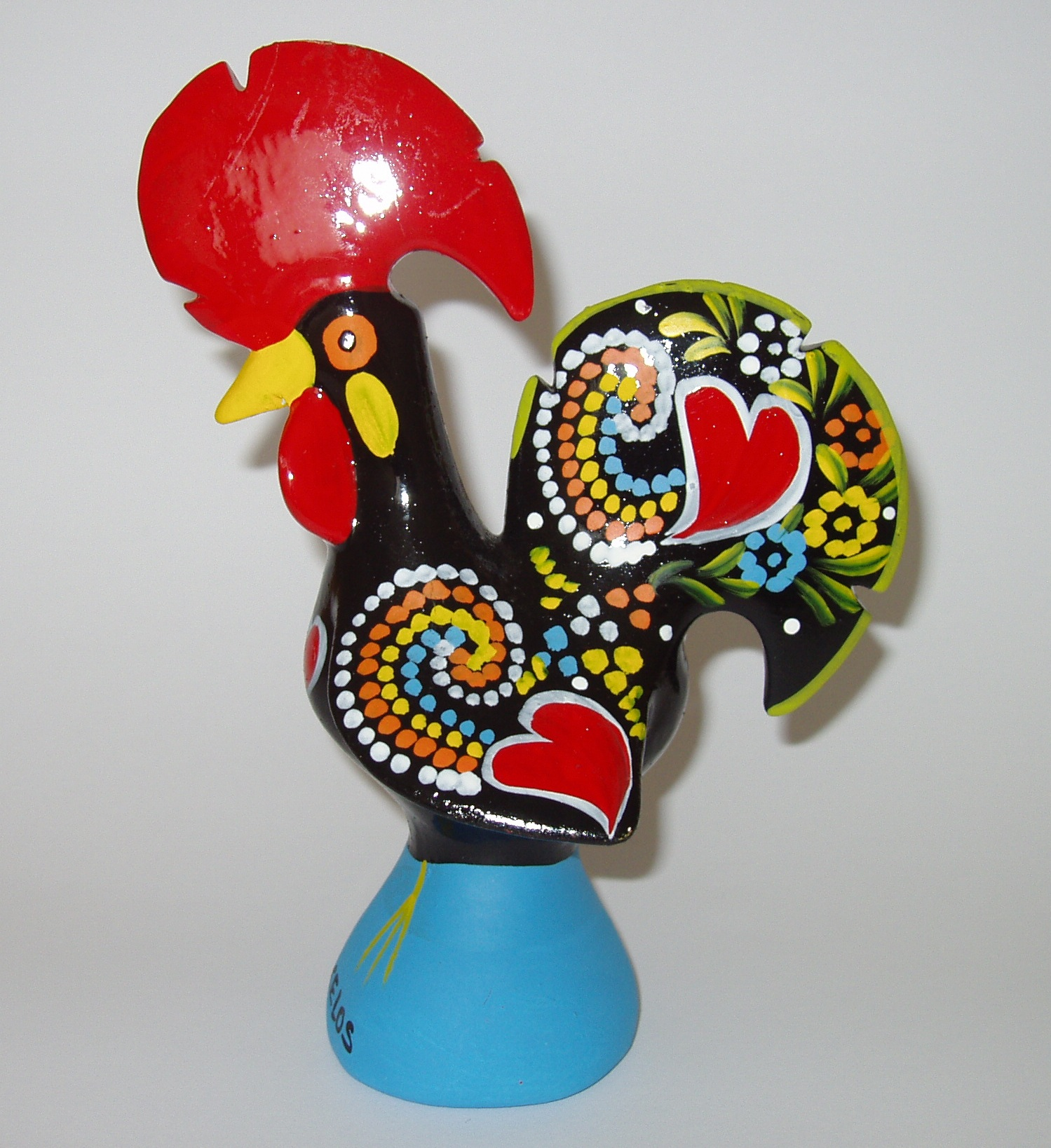
Rooster of Barcelos

The Rooster of Barcelos (Portuguese: Galo de Barcelos) is a common symbol of Portugal.

== Folk tale ==
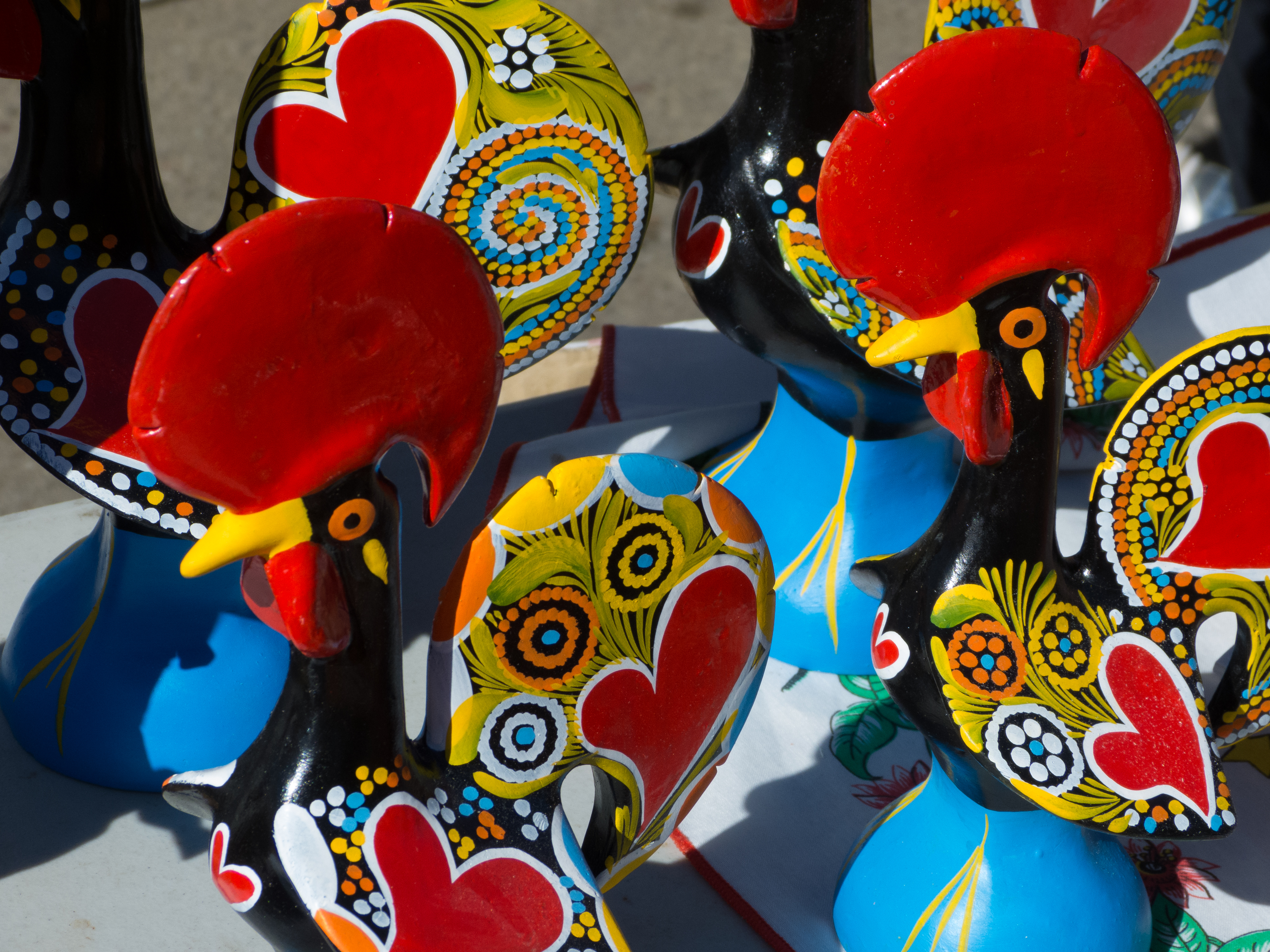
The Rooster of Barcelos is sold as a souvenir from Portugal.

The folk tale of the rooster of Barcelos, tells the story of a dead rooster's miraculous intervention in proving the innocence of a man who had been falsely convicted and sentenced to death. This story is associated with the 17th-century calvary that is part of the collection of the Archaeological Museum located in Paço dos Condes, a gothic-style palace in Barcelos, a city in the Braga District of northwest Portugal.

According to the tale, a landowner in Barcelos had stolen silver and the inhabitants of that city were looking for the thief. A man from Galicia became a suspect, despite his pleas of innocence. The Galician swore that he was merely passing through Barcelos on a pilgrimage to Santiago de Compostela to fulfill a promise.

Nevertheless, the authorities arrested the man and condemned him to hang. The man asked them to take him in front of the judge who had condemned him. The authorities honoured his request and took him to the house of the magistrate, who was holding a banquet. Affirming his innocence, the man pointed to a roasted rooster on top of the banquet table and exclaimed, "It is as certain that I am innocent as that rooster will crow when they hang me." The judge pushed aside his plate, deciding not to eat the rooster, but otherwise ignored the appeal.

However, while the pilgrim was hanged, the roasted rooster stood up on the table and crowed as predicted. Understanding his error, the judge ran to the gallows, to discover that the man had been saved from death thanks to a poorly made knot. The man was immediately freed.

Some years later, he returned to Barcelos to sculpt the Calvary (or Crucifix) to the Lord of the Rooster (Portuguese: "Cruzeiro do Senhor do Galo") in praise to the Virgin Mary and to Saint James. The monument is located in the Barcelos Archaeological Museum.

=== Variations ===
In all cases, the folk tale of the Rooster of Barcelos is about a dead rooster that crows to prove an accused man's innocence. However, variations to the story include:

- The pilgrim is a guest whom the landowner invited to his banquet, where silver is stolen.
- The pilgrim stays at a local inn, and the greedy owner of the inn accuses the pilgrim.
- There are two pilgrims, father and son. The son is accused, and the father pleads his innocence by calling on the rooster to crow.
- The rooster crows as soon as the accused man declares it will, so the man is never taken to the gallows.
- The accused is not from Galicia.

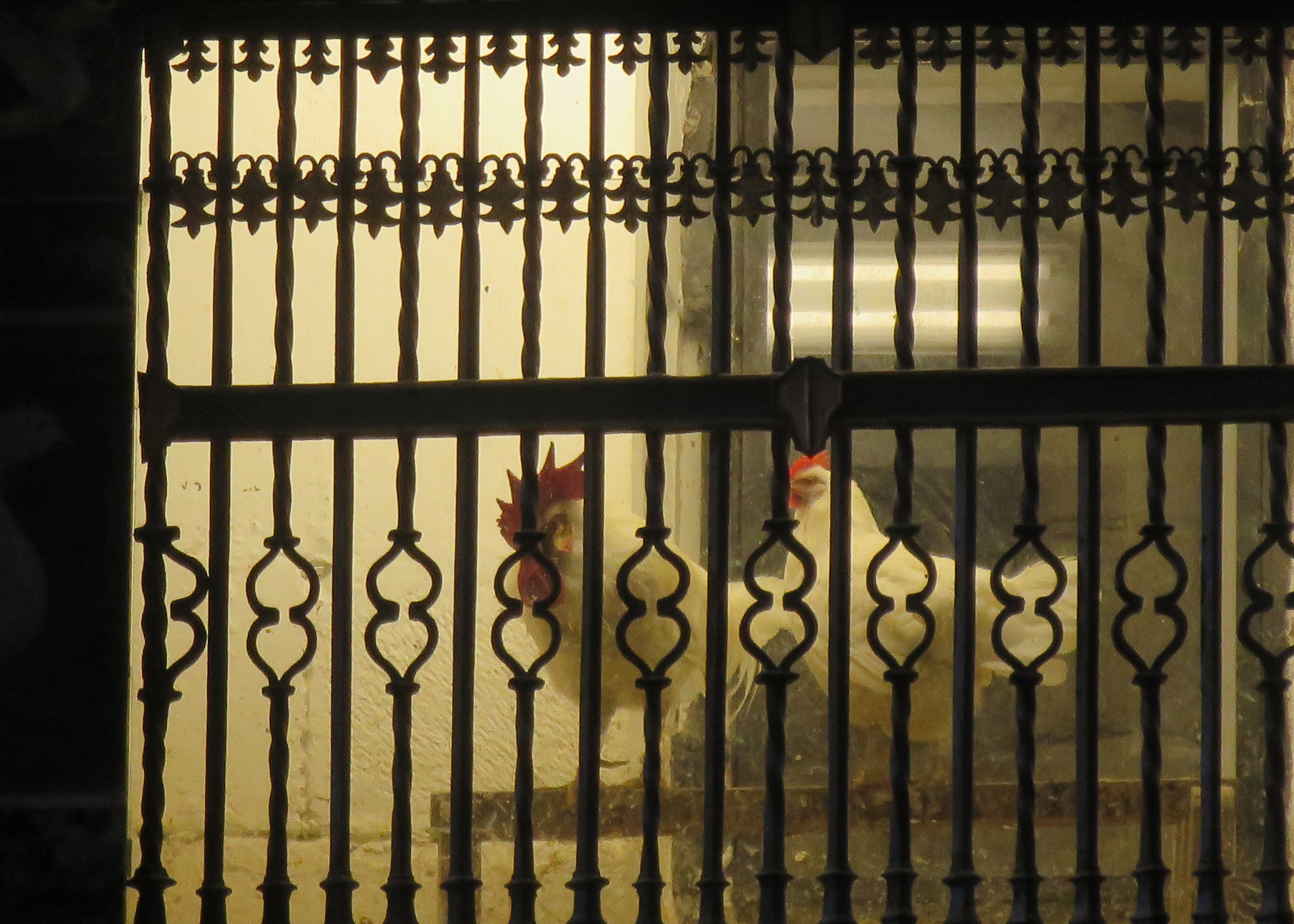
The cathedral of Santo Domingo de la Calzada in Spain keeps two live chickens in remembrance of the local version of the miracle.

- The miracle is located in La Rioja, Spain, and associated to Saint Dominic de la Calzada.

=== In popular culture ===
In the 1990s U.S. sitcom Seinfeld, Elaine's first apartment, which she shares with a roommate who briefly dates Kramer, is shown furnished in kitschy style, cluttered with bric-a-brac—including a rooster of Barcelos. It can be seen in the episode "The Truth", aired in 1991.

The rooster of Barcelos is used in the logo of Nando's, a Johannesburg-based chicken restaurant chain.

== See also ==
- Symbols of Portugal
- Gallic rooster
