= Juan de Ortega (hermit) =

Spanish saint (1080–1163)

Saint John the Hermit
- Born: 1080; Quintanaortuño, Spain
- Died: 1163
- Venerated in: Roman Catholic Church
- Major shrine: San Juan de Ortega

Juan de Ortega, better known as Saint John the Hermit (1080 – 1163), was a Spanish priest and hermit. A disciple of Dominic de la Calzada, he is best known for repairing roads and bridges along the Camino de Santiago. He also built a hospice as a shelter for pilgrims and founded the monastery of San Juan de Ortega.

Juan of Velazquez, later known Juan de Ortega, was born in the Burgos village of Quintanaortuño in 1080. As a young man he assisted Dominic de la Calzada construct bridges in Logrono, Santo Domingo de la Calzada, and Najera to aid pilgrims on their way to Santiago de Compostela. When Domingo died in 1109, John went on pilgrimage to the Holy Land.

As he was returning by sea from a pilgrimage to Jerusalem, his ship encountered a dangerous storm that threatened to sink it. After safely arriving in Spain, John sought a place of solitude where he could devote himself to contemplation. He erected a hermitage for himself at a forested site known as Urteca or Ortega (Spanish for "nettle"), situated on the pilgrim road to Spain's most popular shrine, Santiago de Compostela.

An area frequented by bandits, it was considered as one of the more dangerous stretches of the pilgrimage route. John built a pilgrim hospice and founded the monastery of San Juan de Ortega. He also built a church in honor of Saint Nicholas, to whose intercession he attributed his deliverance from the storm at sea. He devoted his manual labors to the construction and repair of bridges and roads for the pilgrim route to Compostela. Shortly before his death in 1163, John offered special prayers for the peace of the Church and for the faithful departed.

According to one legend, robbers attempting to steal a cow got lost in a fog only to find themselves at St John's door in the morning. A depiction of this incident is carved on the saint's tomb. San Juan became as a patron of hospice keepers, children, and barren women.

== Sources ==
- Catholic Online
