= Francisco Antonio de Borja-Centelles y Ponce de Léon =

Spanish cardinal (1659–1702)

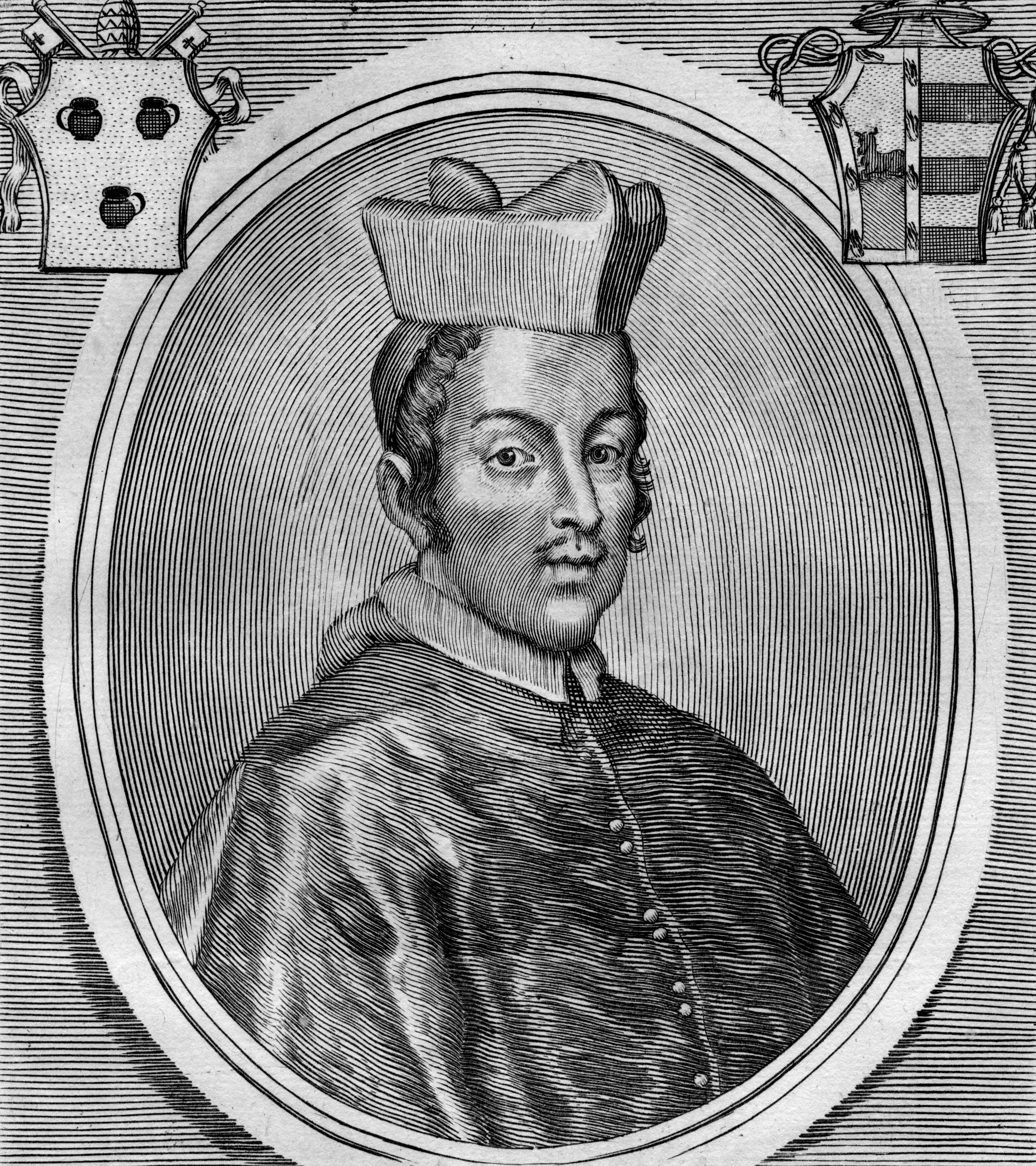
Francisco Antonio de Borja-Centelles y Ponce de León.

Francisco Antonio de Borja-Centelles y Ponce de Léon (27 March 1659 - 3 April 1702) was a Spanish cardinal and member of the Borgia family. He served as Bishop of Calahorra y La Calzada-Logroño (1701–1702) and Archbishop of Burgos (1702).

He was born in Sardinia in 1659, where his family had interests. He was the son of Francisco Carlos de Borja, IX Duke of Gandía, and María Ana Ponce de León, daughter of Rodrigo Ponce de León, 4th Duke of Arcos.

== Ecclesiastical career ==
He was named cardinal by Pope Innocent XII in the consistory of June 21, 1700. On June 9, 1701, he became the bishop of Calahorra, and in November of that year he became the archbishop of Burgos. However, he died on 4 April 1702, being buried in the Church of the Company of Jesus next to his ancestor San Francisco de Borja.

== External links and additional sources ==
- Cheney, David M. "Diocese of Calahorra y La Calzada–Logroño". Catholic-Hierarchy.org. (for Chronology of Bishops)^{self-published}
- Chow, Gabriel. "Diocese of Calahorra y La Calzada–Logroño". GCatholic.org. (for Chronology of Bishops)^{self-published}
- Cheney, David M. "Archdiocese of Burgos". Catholic-Hierarchy.org. (for Chronology of Bishops) ^{[self-published]}
- Chow, Gabriel. "Metropolitan Archdiocese of Burgos (Spain)". GCatholic.org. (for Chronology of Bishops) ^{[self-published]}
- Biographical Dictionary - Consistory of June 21, 1700
