= Emeterius and Celedonius =

Saints Emeterius and Celedonius
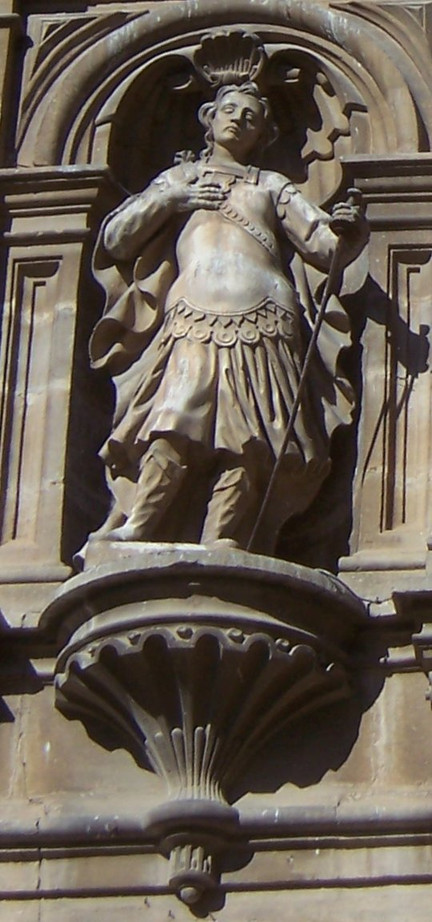
- Statue of Emeterius, Cathedral of Santo Domingo de la Calzada, La Rioja.
- Died: c.300 Calahorra
- Venerated in: Catholic Church, Eastern Orthodox Church
- Feast: August 30
- Attributes: depicted as two young soldiers
- Patronage: Calahorra; Santander

Saints Emeterius (or Hemeterius, Madir) and Celedonius (Spanish: San Emeterio y San Celedonio; Latin: Emeterius et Caeledonius; died c. 300 AD) are venerated as saints by the Catholic Church. Two Roman legionaries (and possibly also brothers), they were martyred for their faith around 300. They are patron saints of Calahorra (La Rioja), which is traditionally regarded as the place of their death.

== Legend ==
They are said to have been serving in this city at the end of the third century or at the beginnings of the fourth. According to one legend, they were the sons of the martyr Marcellus the Centurion. It may have been during either the persecutions of Diocletian or of Valerian when they were imprisoned and forced to decide between renouncing the faith or leaving the army.

Their legend states that they were tortured and finally decapitated on the banks of the Cidacos River outside of Calahorra, which became the site of the actual cathedral of the city and explains its strange location beyond the city walls. The heads of these saints are said to have floated to Santander aboard a boat made of stone. A community of monks who lived in that city became custodians of these holy relics.

According to Prudentius, the brothers Emeterius and Celedonius, soldiers of the Legio VII Gemina, were martyred at Calahorra, but the exact date of their martyrdom is unknown.

== Veneration ==
In the fourth century pilgrims from distant lands came to pray at the tomb of these saints, whose relics are still preserved in Calahorra Cathedral.

The toponym "Santander" actually takes its name not from Saint Andrew as some, misled by the sound of the name, believe, but from Saint Emeterius (Santemter, Santenter, Santander), one of the patrons of the city and ancient abbey, the other being Saint Celedonius. At Santander, Alfonso II of Aragon founded the abbey of Saints Hemeterius and Celedonius, or Santander Abbey, where the heads of those holy martyrs were kept. The former abbey church is now Santander Cathedral.

They are patron saints of Calahorra, Santander, and other towns of Cantabria. Their feast day is August 30.

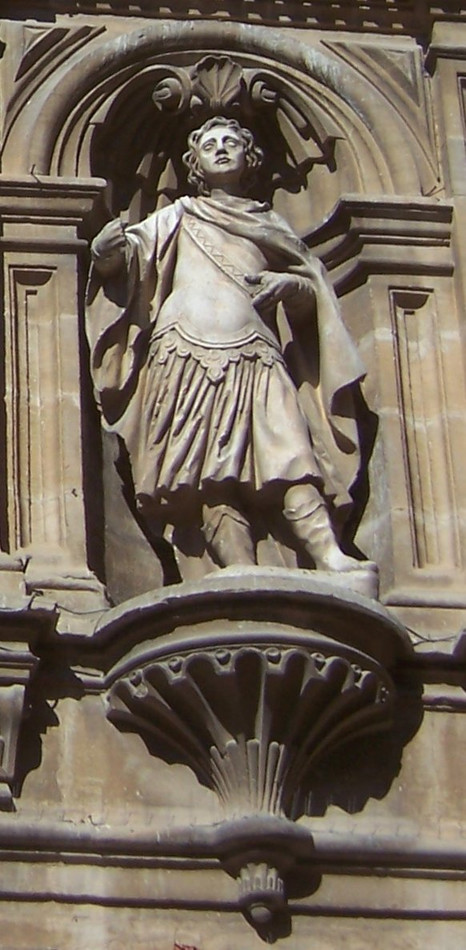
Statue of Celedonius, Cathedral of Santo Domingo de la Calzada, La Rioja.

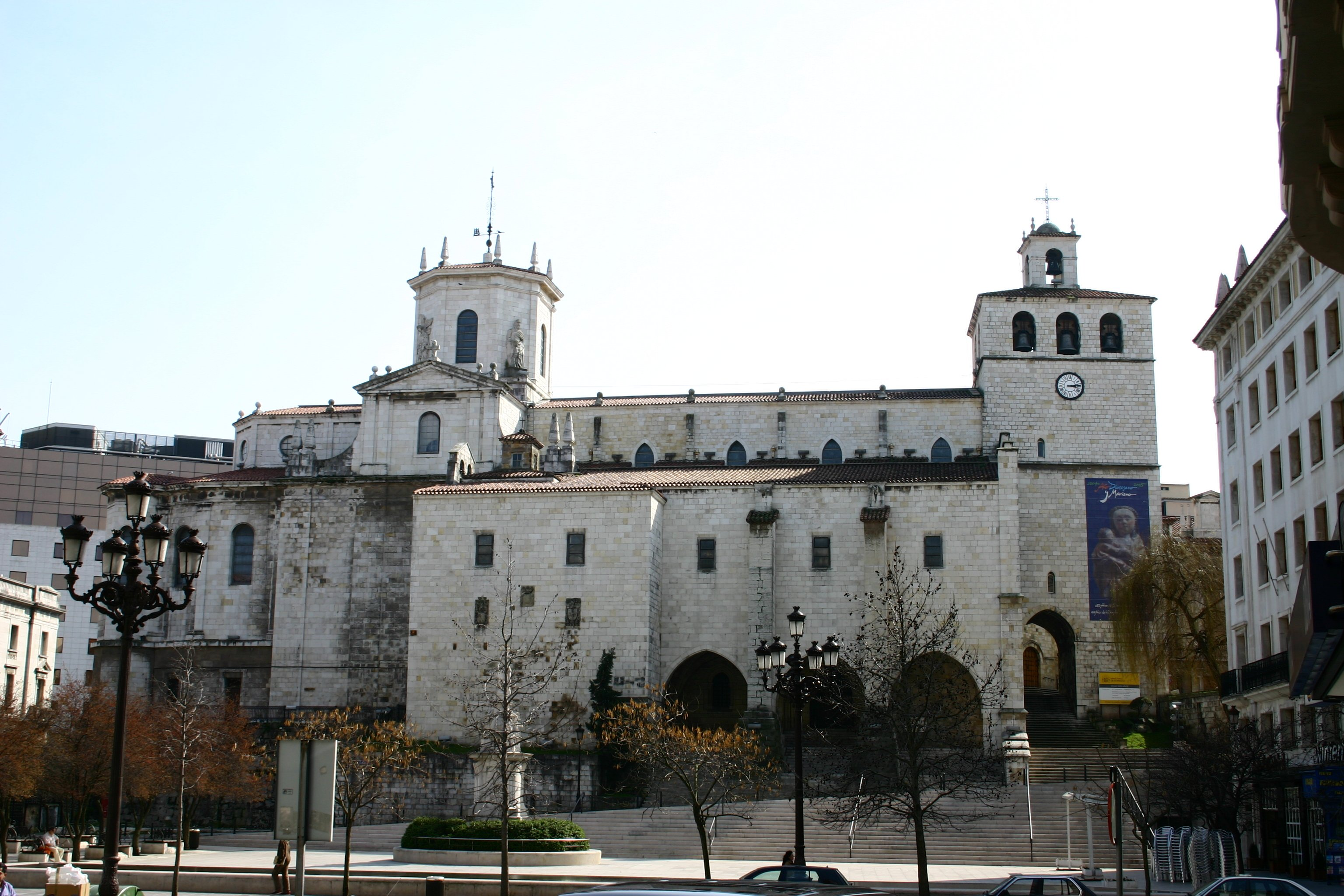
Santander Cathedral, built between the 13th and 14th centuries over the ancient abbey of Saints Emeterius and Celedonius

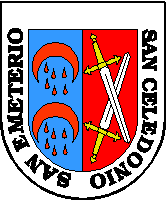
Coat-of-arms of Calahorra, featuring the names of Saints Emeterius and Celedonius

Coat of arms of Cantabria, featuring the heads of Saints Emeterius and Celedonius
