= Santo Domingo de la Calzada =

- Municipality
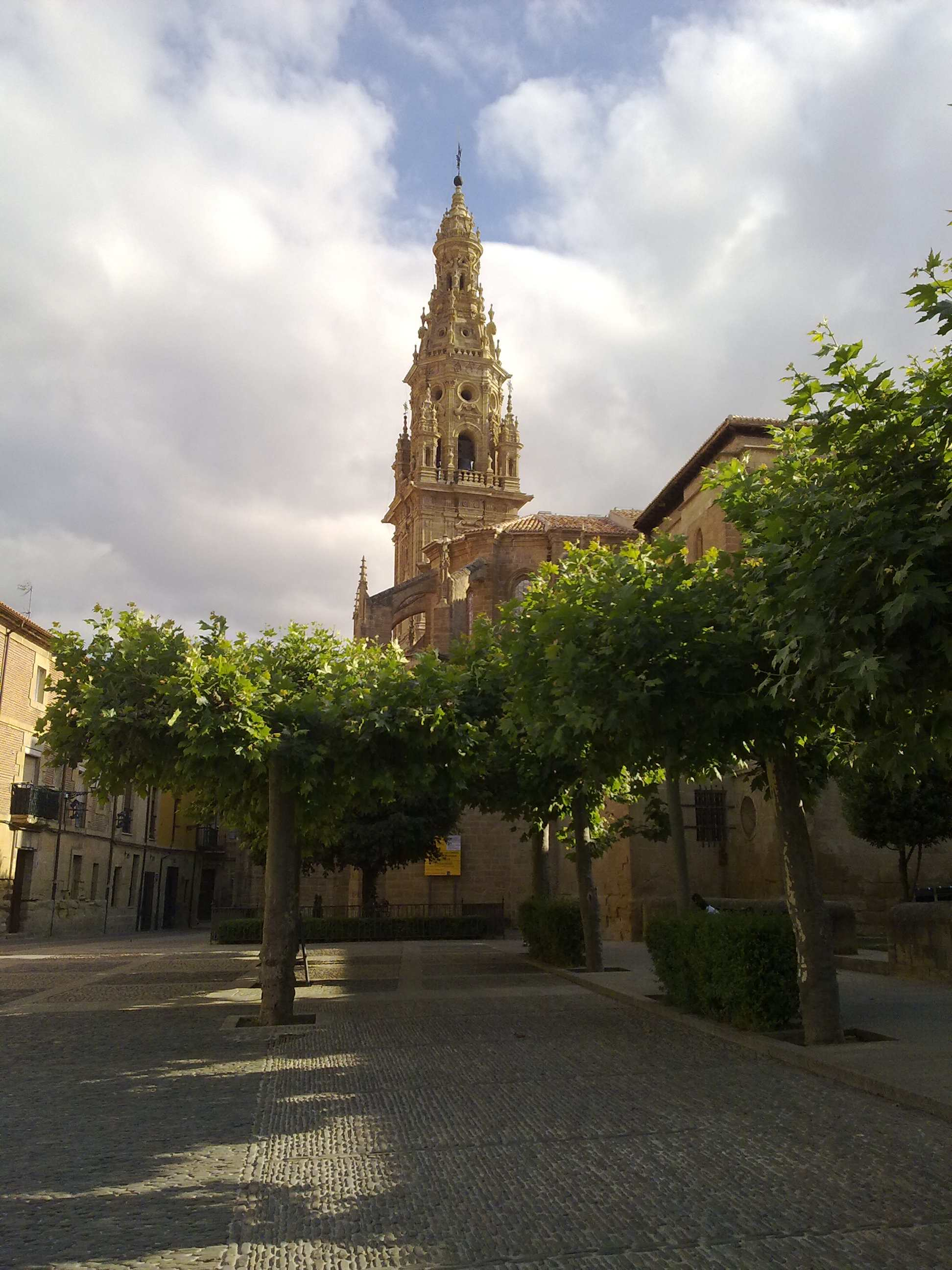
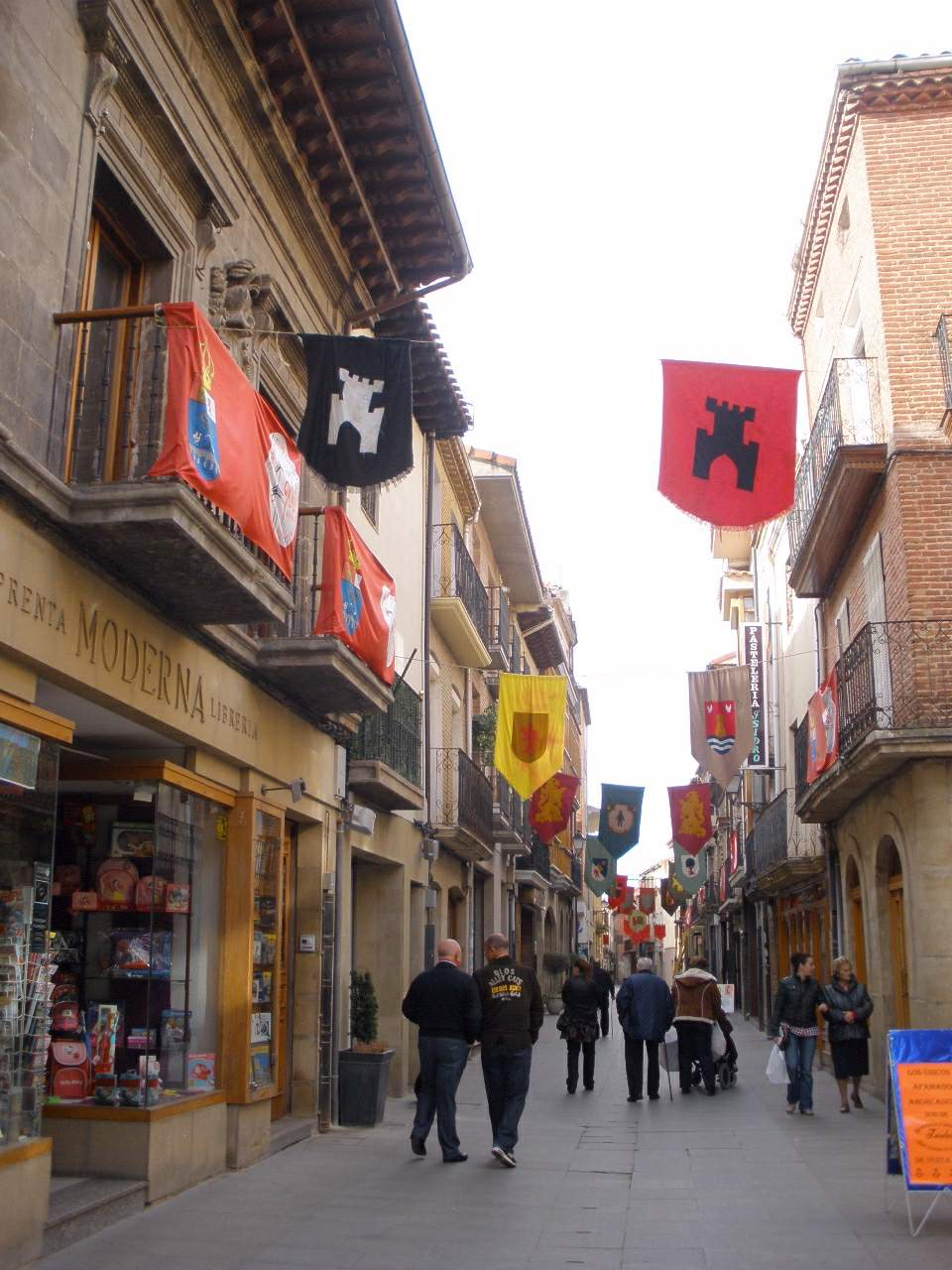
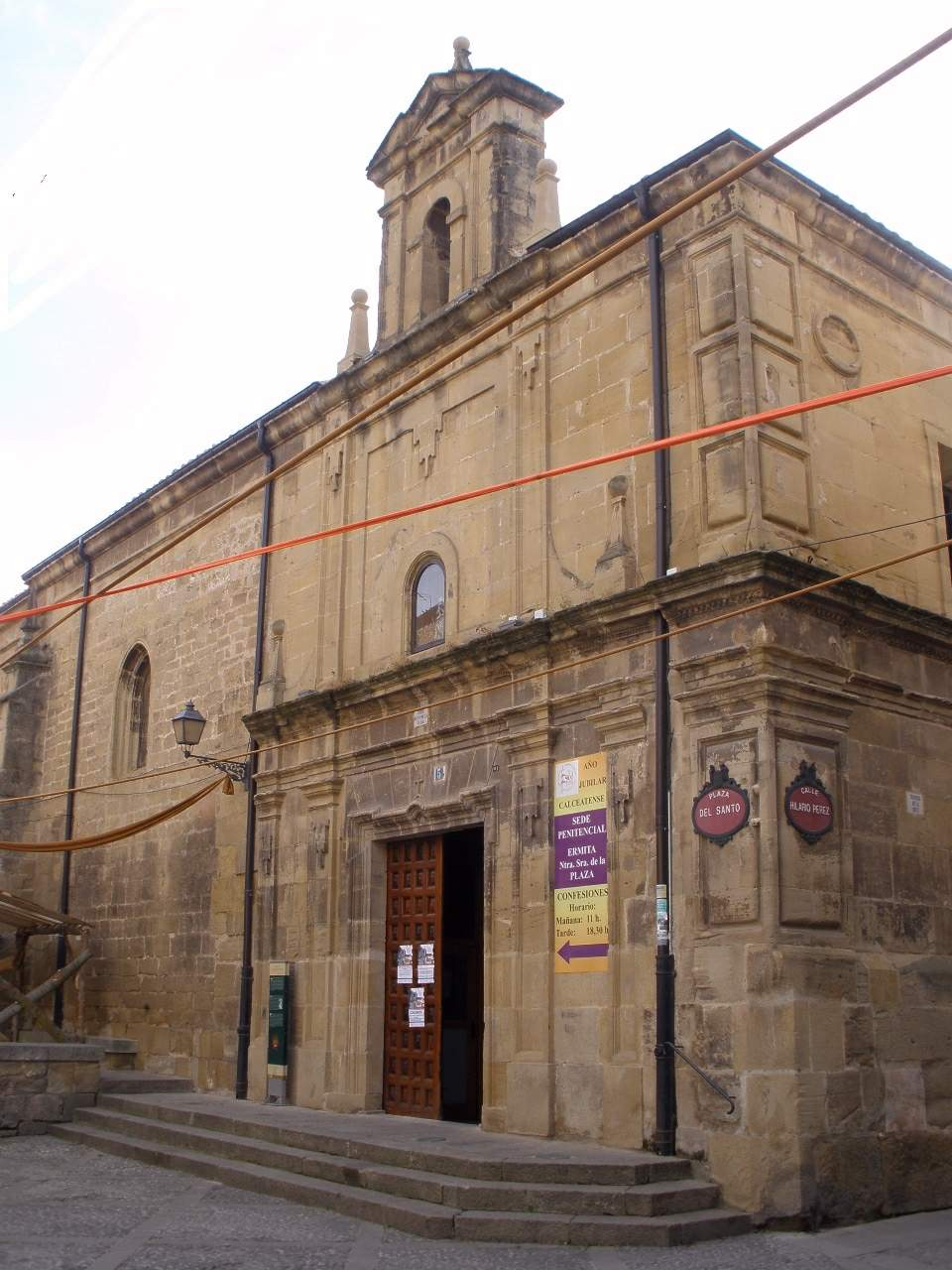
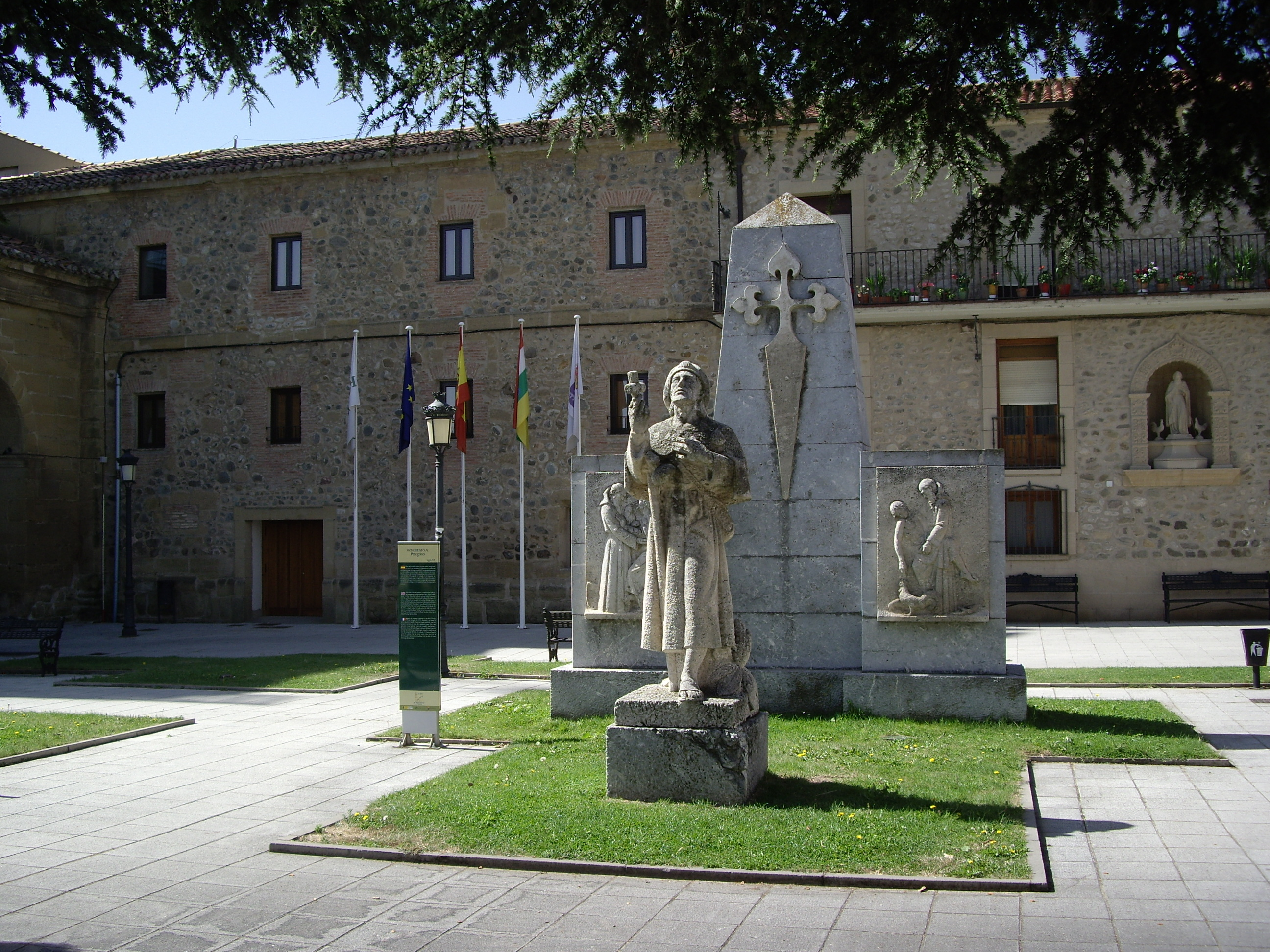
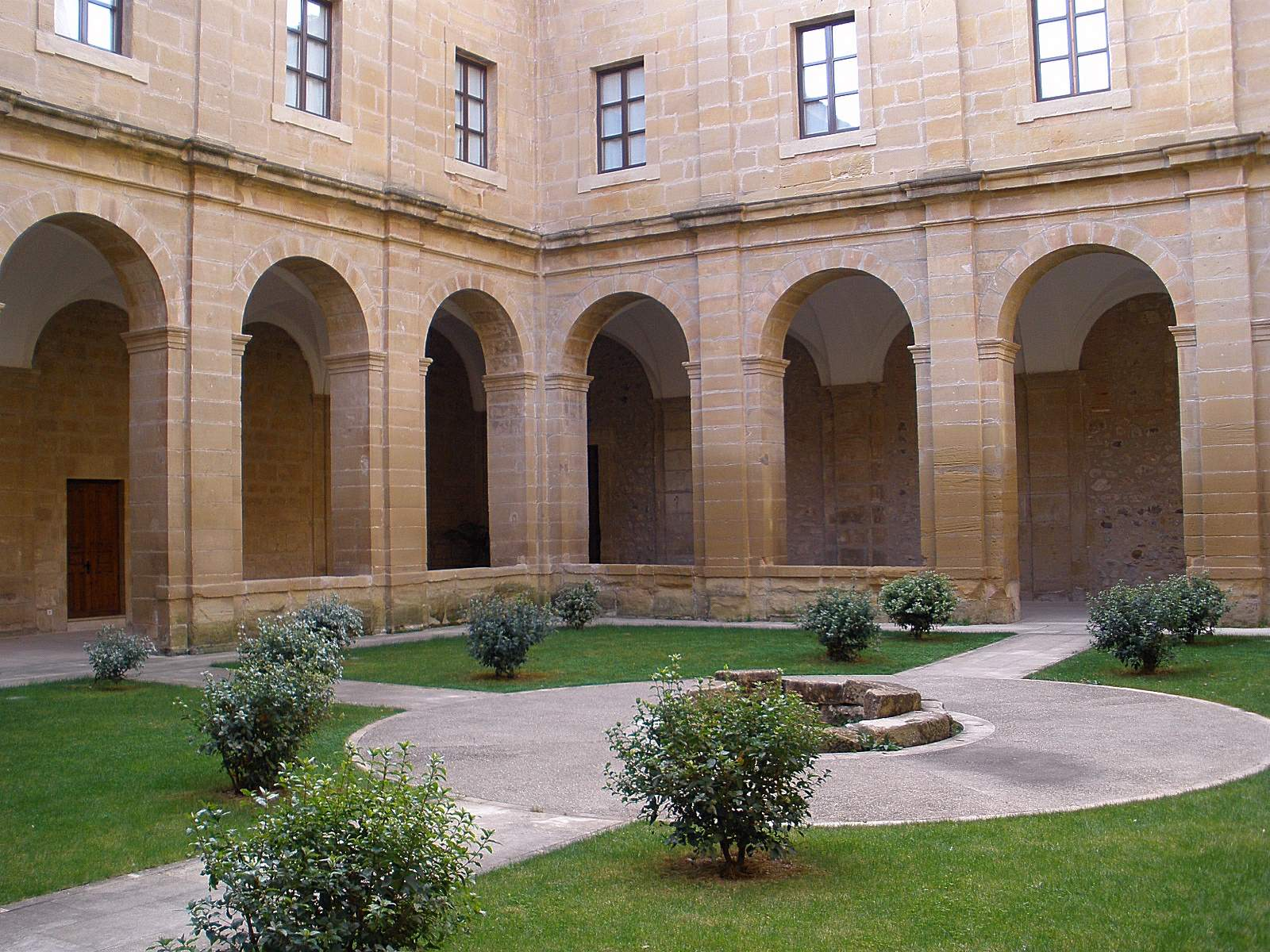
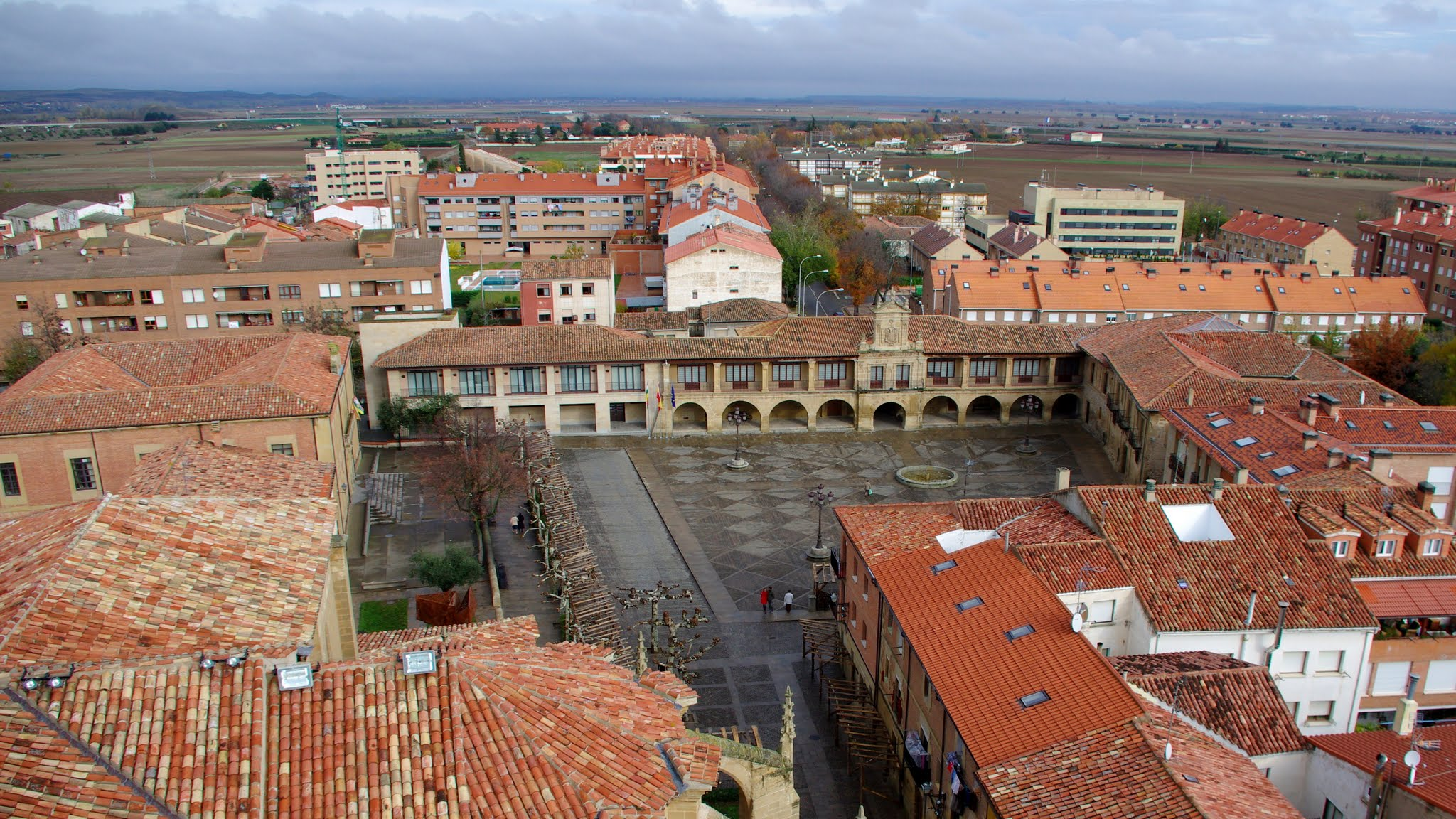
- Cathedral of Santo Domingo de la Calzada

- Coat of arms

- Location in La Rioja Location in Spain
- Coordinates: 42°26′31″N 2°57′9″W
- Country: Spain
- Autonomous Community: La Rioja (Spain)
- Province: La Rioja
- Comarca: Santo Domingo de la Calzada

Government
  - Mayor: Agustín García Metola (PSOE)

Area
  - Total: 40 km^{2} (15 sq mi)
- Elevation (AMSL): 641 m (2,103 ft)

Population (2025-01-01)
  - Total: 6,441
  - Density: 160/km^{2} (420/sq mi)
- Time zone: UTC+1 (CET)
  - Summer (DST): UTC+2 (CEST (GMT +2))
- Postal code: 26250
- Area code: +34 (Spain) + 941 (La Rioja)
- Website: Town Hall

Santo Domingo de la Calzada is a municipality in La Rioja, Spain, situated on the banks of the Oja River.

== Politics ==
List of mayors since the democratic elections of 1979
| Term | Mayor | Political party |
|---|---|---|
| 1979–1983 | Rodolfo Varona Aransay | Grouping of electors |
| 1983–1987 | Rodolfo Varona Aransay | PR |
| 1987–1991 | José Ramón Mendi Barrón | UCD |
| 1991–1995 | Javier Ruiz Aznárez | PSOE |
| 1995–1999 | Esther Vargas Domingo | PP |
| 1999–2003 | Esther Vargas Domingo | PP |
| 2003–2007 | Agustín García Metola | PSOE |
| 2007–2011 | Agustín García Metola | PSOE |
| 2011–2015 | Javier Azpeitia Sáez | PP |
| 2015–2019 | Agustín García Metola | PSOE |
| 2019–2023 | Javier Ruiz Bartolomé | PSOE |
| 2023– | n/d | n/d |

== Notable people ==
- Henry II of Castile died in the city in 1379
- Gustavo Bueno
- Jerónimo Hermosilla
- Ángel Augusto de Monasterio

== See also ==
- Dominic de la Calzada
