= Calahorra Cathedral =

Catholic church in Calahorra, Spain

- Cathedral of Saint Mary
- Catedral de Santa Maria
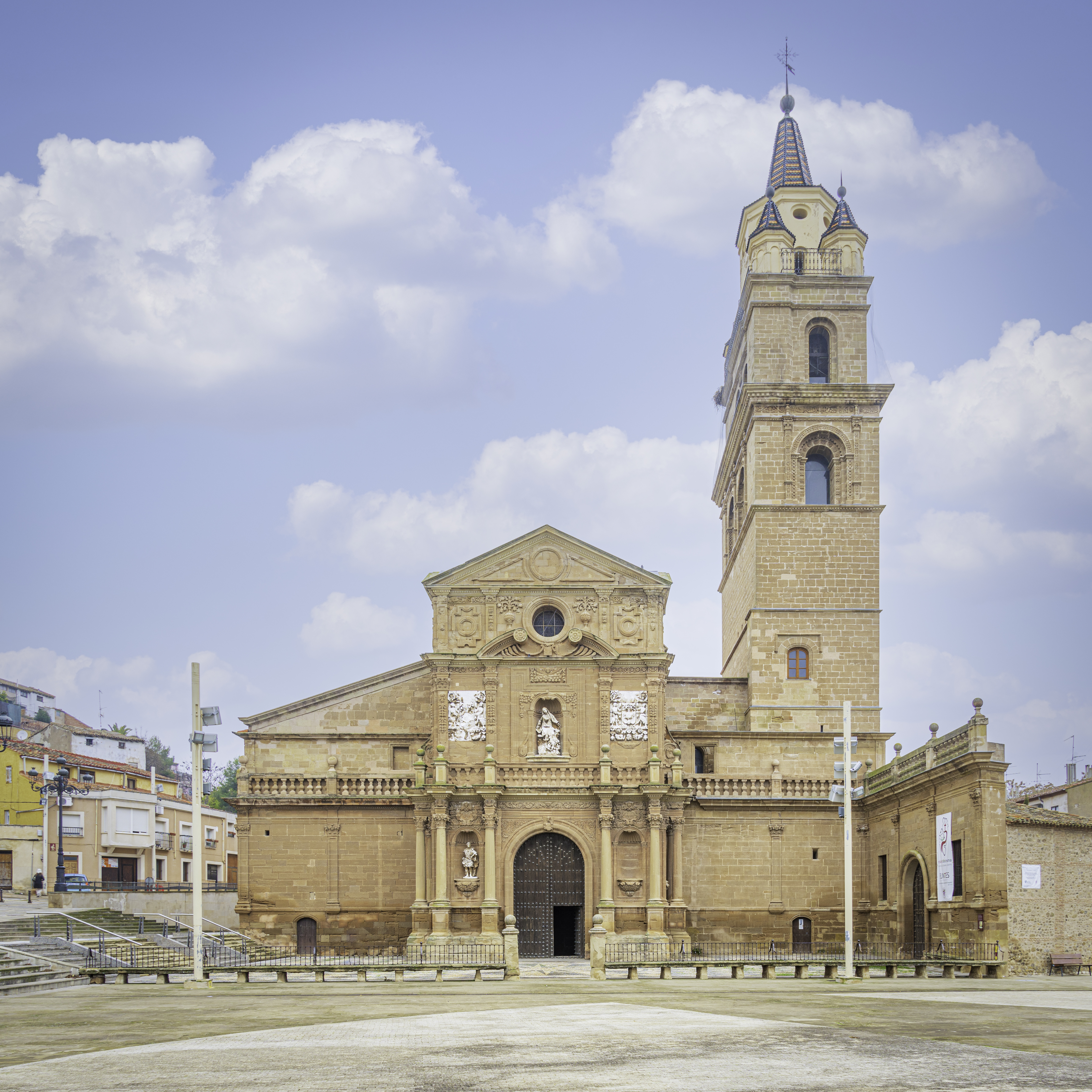
- West façade in 2021.
- Calahorra Cathedral
- 42°17′56″N 1°57′27″W
- Location: Calahorra
- Address: 69, Calle de la Mediavilla
- Country: Spain
- Denomination: Catholic
- Website: catedralcalahorra.com

History
- Status: Cathedral
- Dedication: Mary, mother of Jesus

Architecture
- Style: Gothic, Baroque
- Groundbreaking: 1484

Administration
- Metropolis: Pamplona and Tudela
- Diocese: Calahorra and La Calzada-Logroño

Clergy
- Bishop: Santos Montoya Torres

Spanish Cultural Heritage
- Type: Non-movable
- Criteria: Monument
- Designated: 3 June 1931
- Reference no.: RI-51-0000700

The Cathedral of Saint Mary (Spanish: Catedral de Santa María) is a cathedral located in Calahorra (in La Rioja, Spain). It is one of the cathedrals belonging to the Roman Catholic Diocese of Calahorra y La Calzada-Logroño.

The building was given a heritage listing in 1931, and is currently protected as a Bien de Interés Cultural.

== History ==
According to the Roman Christian poet Prudentius, San Emeterio and San Celedonio, two Roman brothers and legionaries who converted to Christianity, were beheaded in Calahorra around the year 300. Local legend states that the cathedral was built on the spot where the two were killed. They are now venerated as patron saints of the city and their relics are still kept inside the cathedral.

The site of the martyrdom become a place of pilgrimage in the 4th century, which led to the construction of a Visigoth baptistery, later destroyed during the Arab conquest. Following the city's return to Christian rule during Reconquista, the episcopal see was restored in 1045.

Construction of the current building began in 1484 in the Gothic style, but gained several other influences over the next centuries, the facade and interior decorations being examples of Baroque. The main work on the cathedral was done by the 18th century, with the last element added being the retable of the main altar, in 1904, after the original one was destroyed during a fire in 1900.
