= Calahorra =

Calahorra Calagorra (Aragonese)
- City and Municipality
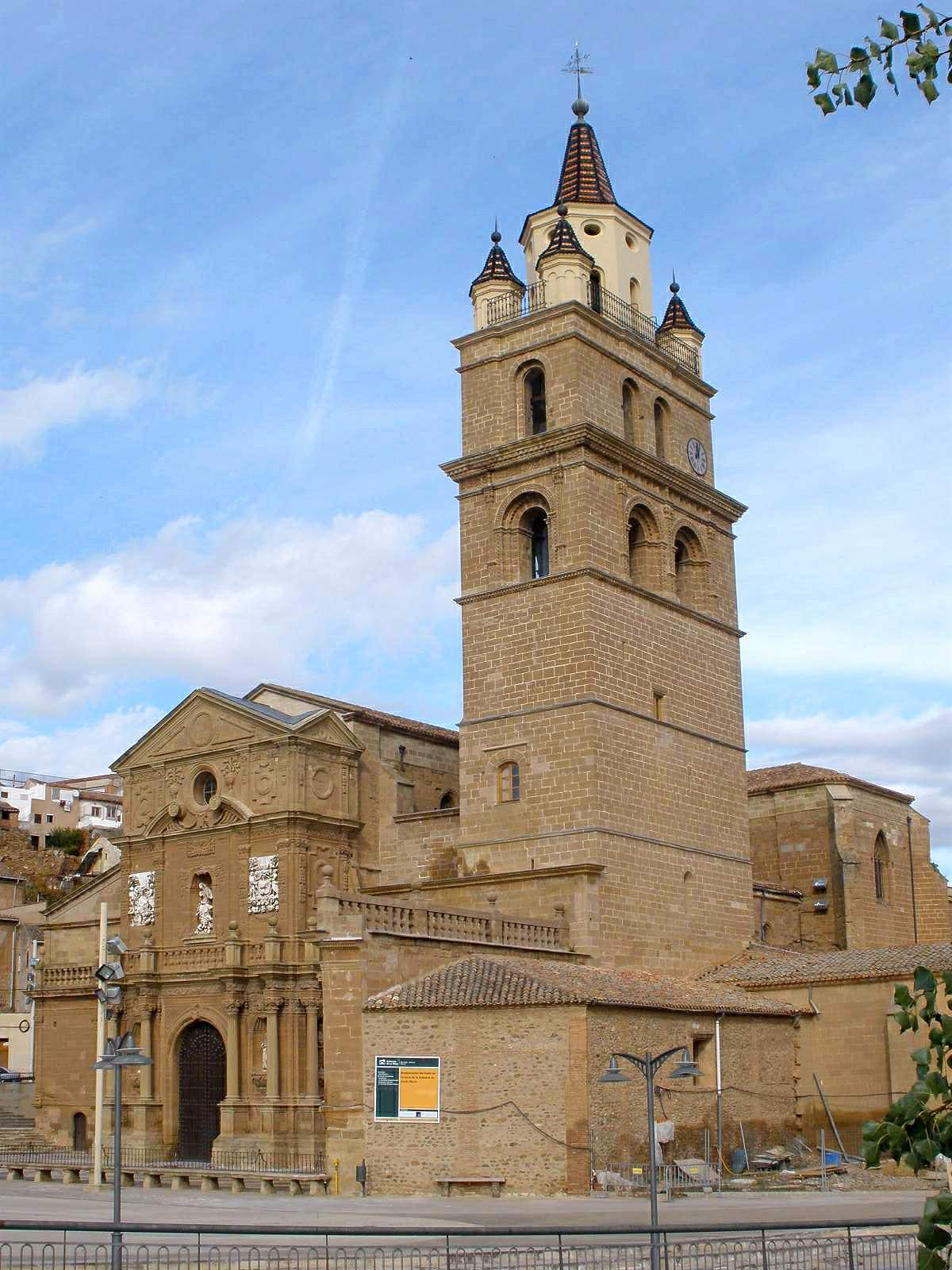
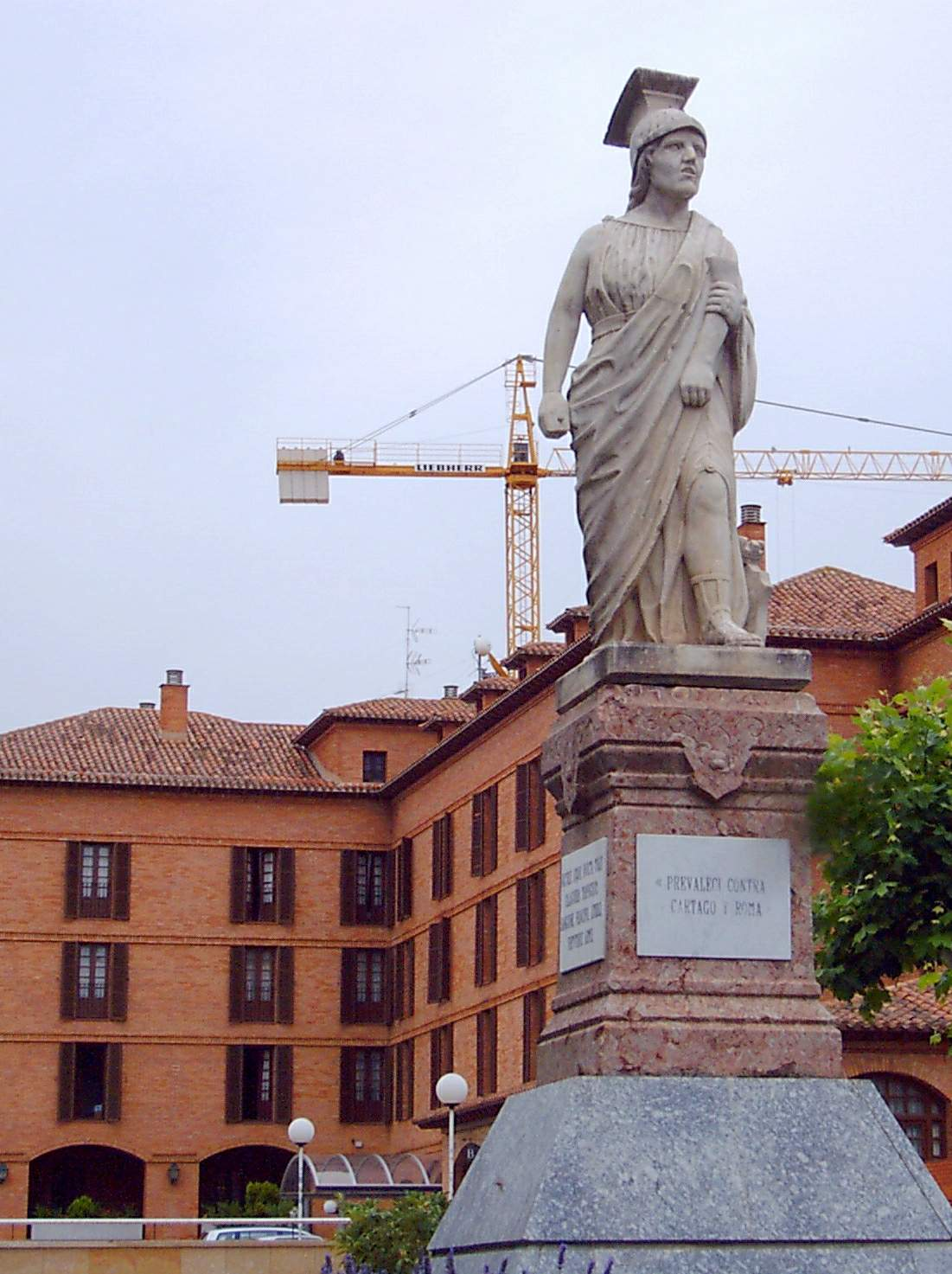
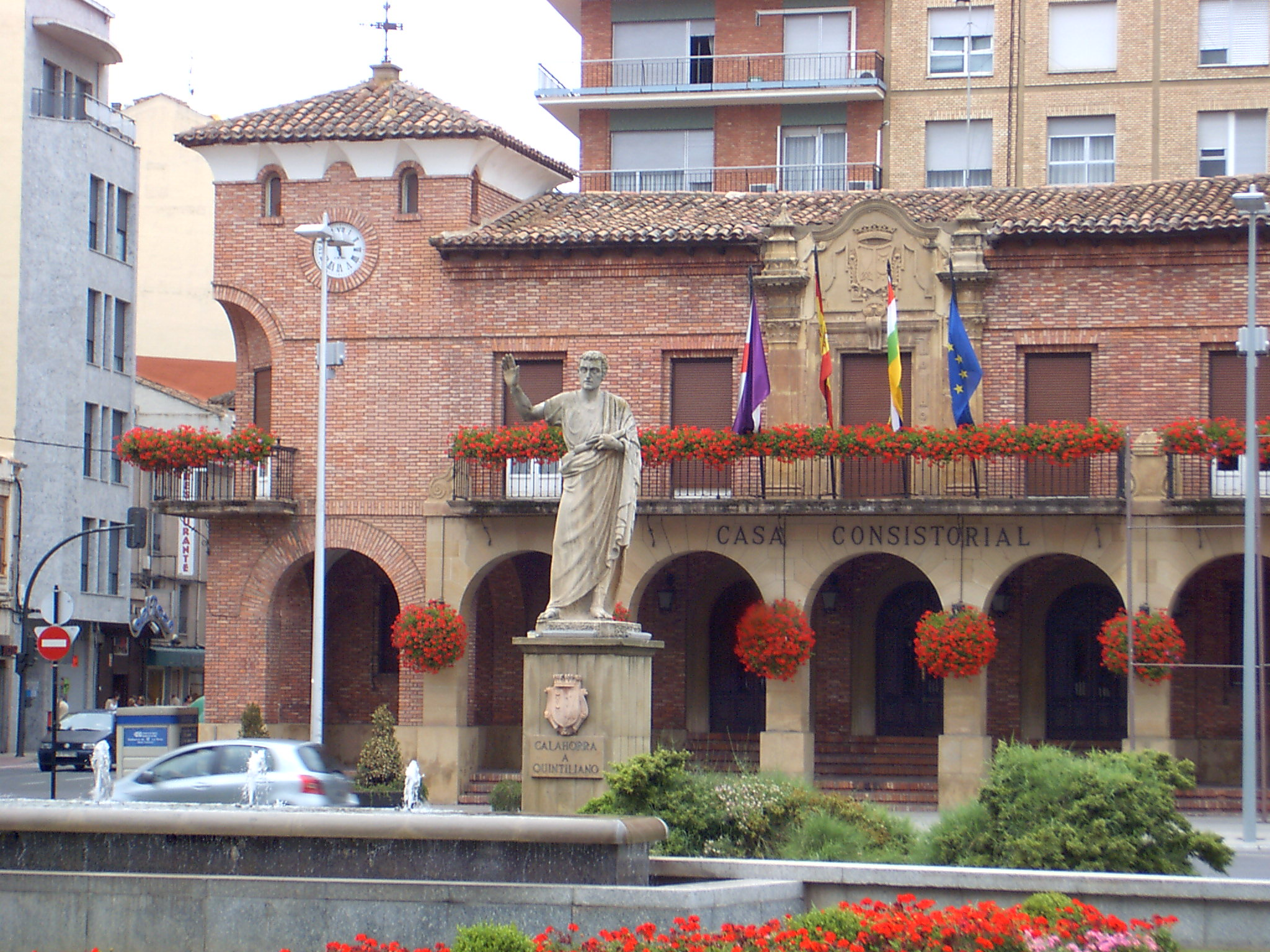
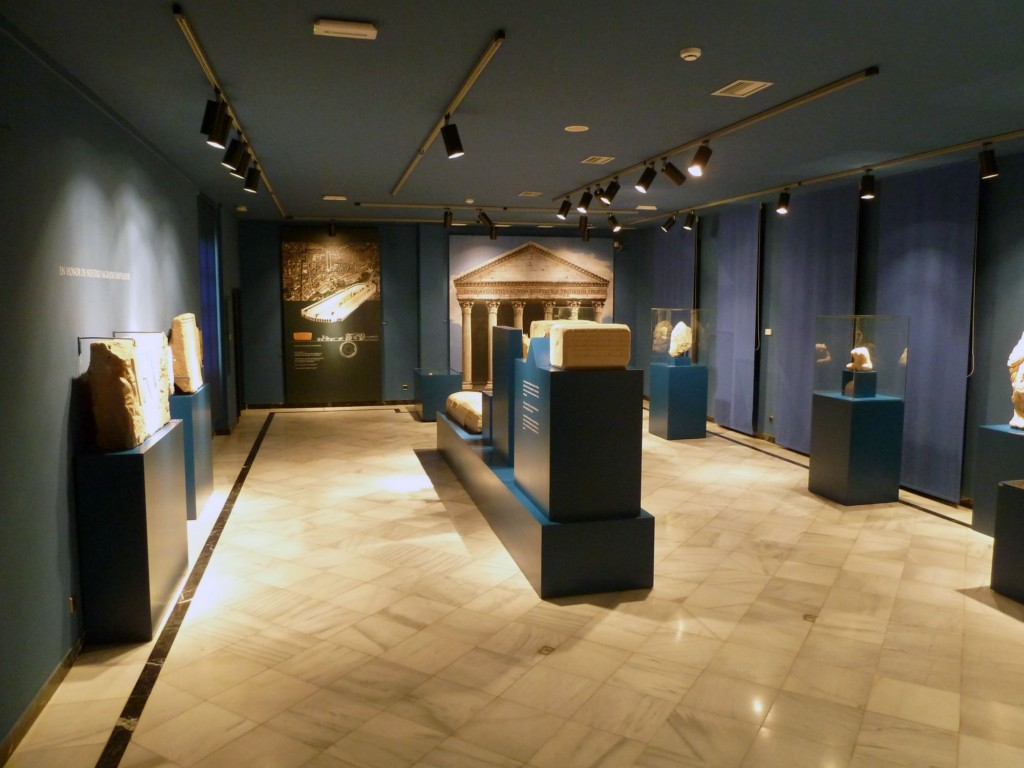
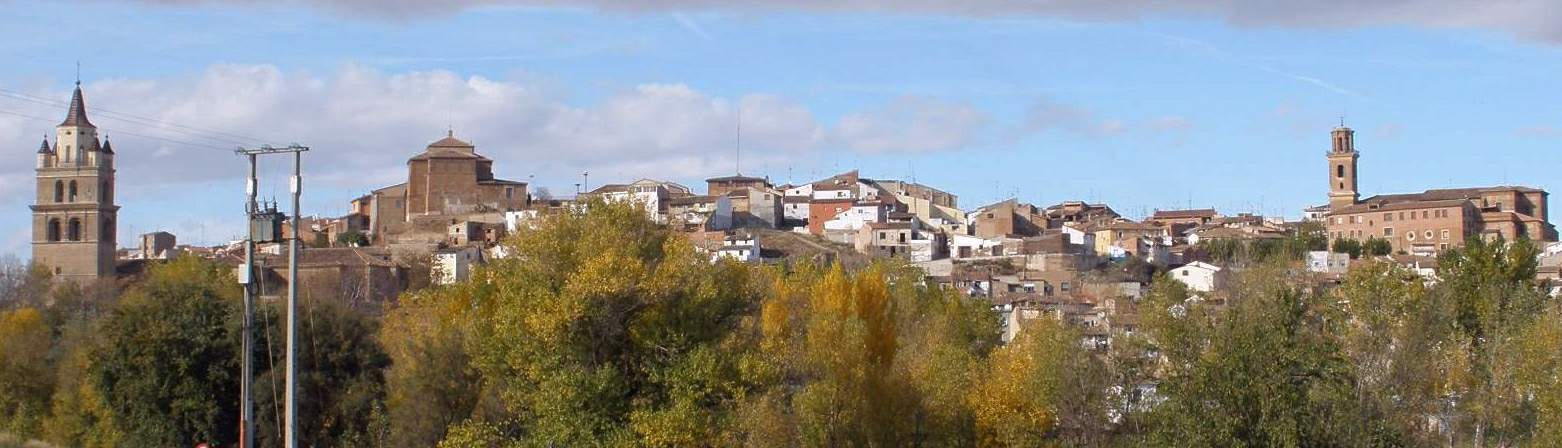

- Flag Coat of arms

- Location of the Municipality within La Rioja.

- Location in La Rioja Location in Spain
- Coordinates: 42°18′00″N 1°58′00″W
- Country: Spain
- Community: La Rioja
- Province: La Rioja ("Uniprovincial" autonomous community)
- Comarca: Rioja Baja

Government
  - Mayor (Since 2019): Elisa Garrido Jiménez (PSOE)

Area
  - Total: 93.57 km^{2} (36.13 sq mi)
- Elevation: 358 m (1,175 ft)

Population (2025-01-01)
  - Total: 25,367
  - Density: 271.1/km^{2} (702.2/sq mi)
- Time zone: UTC+1 (CET)
  - Summer (DST): UTC+2 (CET)
- Website: www.ayto-calahorra.es

Calahorra (Spanish: [kalaˈora]; Aragonese: Calagorra; Latin: Calagurris) is a municipality in the Spanish autonomous community and province of La Rioja. During Ancient Roman times, Calahorra was a municipium known as Calagurris Nassica Iulia.

== Location ==
The city is located on a hill at an altitude of 358 metres at the confluence of the Ebro and Cidacos rivers, and has an area of 91.41 km². Calahorra is the second-largest city in La Rioja in population and importance, after the capital, Logroño. Its population is 23,923 people.

It is well-connected to other cities, especially by highway. It is situated in the Ebro valley, 48 kilometres from Logroño, 120 km from Zaragoza and 180 km from Bilbao, and is connected to these cities by national highway 232, the A-68 motorway (Vasco-Aragonesa) and the Bilbao-Zaragoza rail line.

Its daily bus services link it to such cities as Pamplona, Soria and San Sebastián.

Its status as seat of a comarca and judicial district make it a service-industry city in administrative, commercial and leisure fields.

== History ==
Calahorra has been inhabited since the Paleolithic, and its stable population dates to the Iron Age.

Rome conquered the town in 187 BC and brought it to its highest point of importance as an administrative centre for surrounding regions. Calahorra supported Quintus Sertorius in his war against Pompey, whom the city resisted successfully since 76 BC. It was only taken four years later by Pompey's legate Lucius Afranius, after a lot of inhabitants had died from starvation and there had occurred cannibalism. Julius Caesar and Augustus Caesar gave the city (then named Calagurris) numerous distinctions, converted it into a municipality, and developed its city planning, economy, and politics. Its archaeological remains show that it had a circus, baths, an amphitheatre, and other services found in large cities. It minted money and served as a justice administration centre.

Quintilian, well known for his descriptions of the culture of that time, was born in Calahorra, and the Parador in the city is named after him. It has Roman ruins in the grounds. Saints Emeterius and Celedonius, martyred in the city around 305 AD, are the patron saints of the city, and the city's coat of arms depict their names. The cathedral is dedicated to them. The Christian Roman poet Prudentius may have inhabited at some point in Calahorra, who pinpoints it on the territory of the Vascones in the 4th century.

After the rule of the Moors in the 9th and 10th centuries the Christian king García Sánchez III of Pamplona captured the city in 1045.

Calahorra was once home to one of the most ancient Jewish communities in Castile, dating to 1145 AD. In 1492, when the Jews were expelled, most left rather than become conversos.

The population had reached 7,000 by the 1840s.

== Politics ==
List of mayors since the democratic elections of 1979
Term	Mayor	Political party
1979–1983	Ernesto Sáenz Enciso	CIR
1983–1987	María Antonia San Felipe	PSOE
1987–1991	Fernando Deza (1987), María Antonia San Felipe	AP, PSOE
1991–1995	María Antonia San Felipe	PSOE
1995–1999	Javier Pagola	PP
1999–2003	Javier Pagola	PP
2003–2007	Javier Pagola	PP
2007–2011	Javier Pagola	PP
2011–2015	Javier Pagola (2011-2014), Luis Martínez-Portillo (2014-2015)	PP
2015–2019	Luis Martínez-Portillo	PP
2019–2023	Elisa Garrido Jiménez	PSOE
2023–	Mónica Mercedes Arceiz Martínez	PP

== Places of interest ==
- Calahorra Cathedral

== Twin cities ==
- Monte Compatri, Italy
- Caussade, France

== Gallery ==
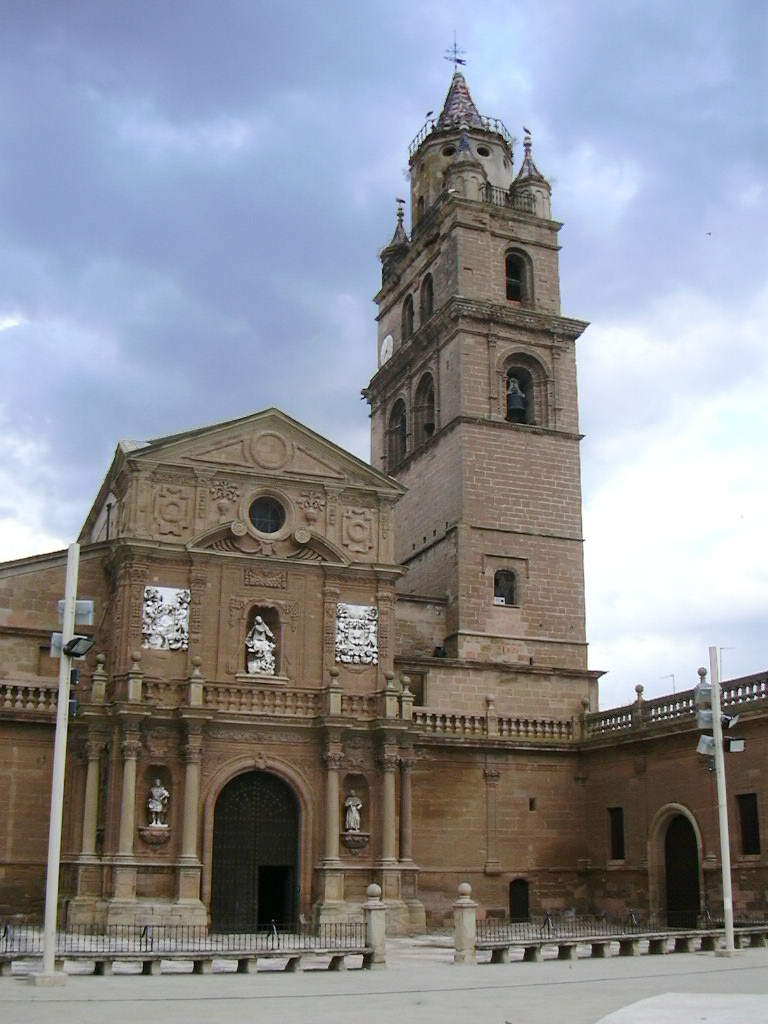
Cathedral of Calahorra (main facade).

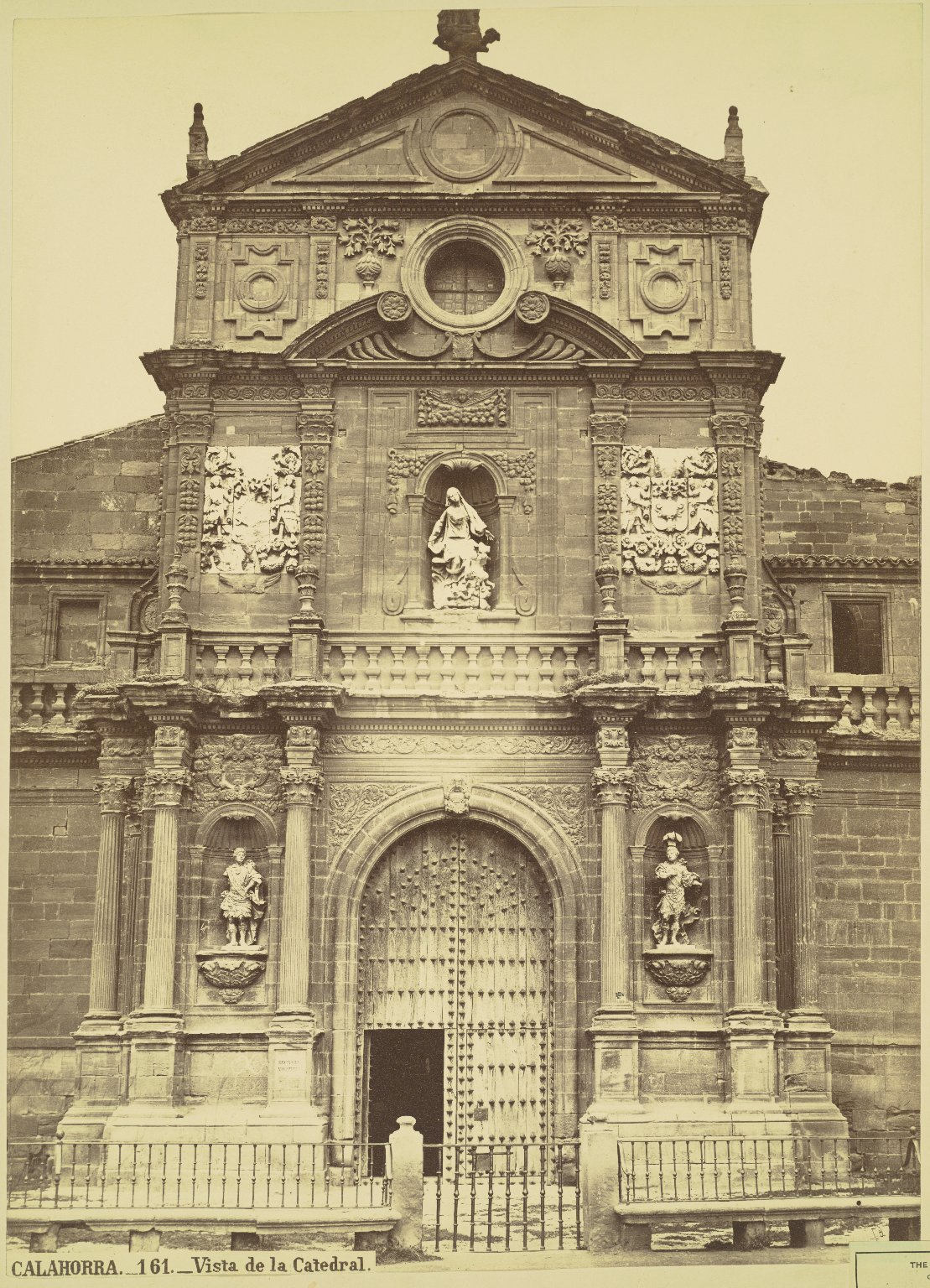
Chapel of the Calahorra Castle, from an albumen print taken by the French photographer Jean Laurent, c. 1865-1881

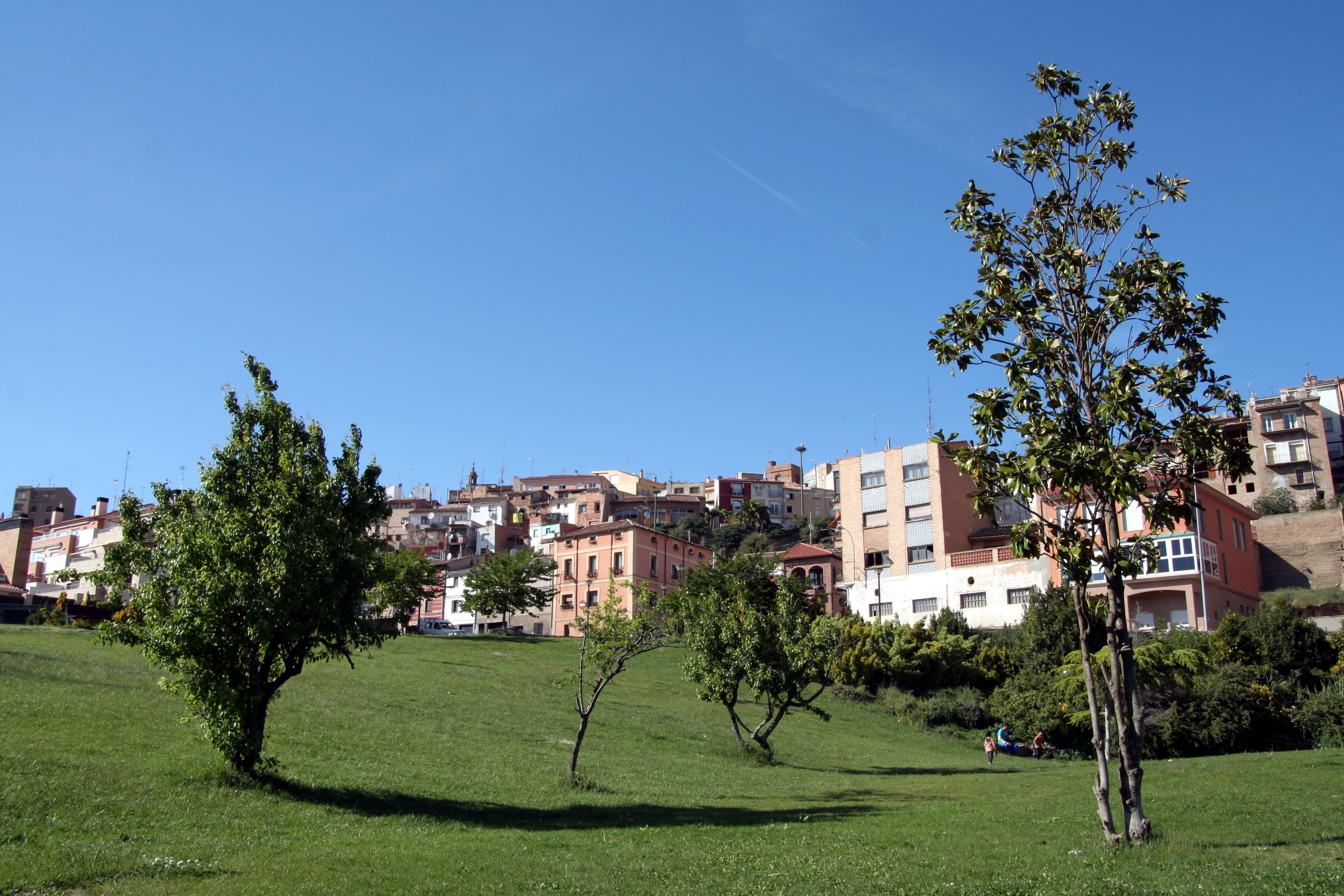
View of Calahorra

== See also ==
La Calahorra Village in Andalucia
