= Virgin of Hope of Macarena =

Religious sculpture in Seville, Spain

Mary Most Holy of Hope Macarena
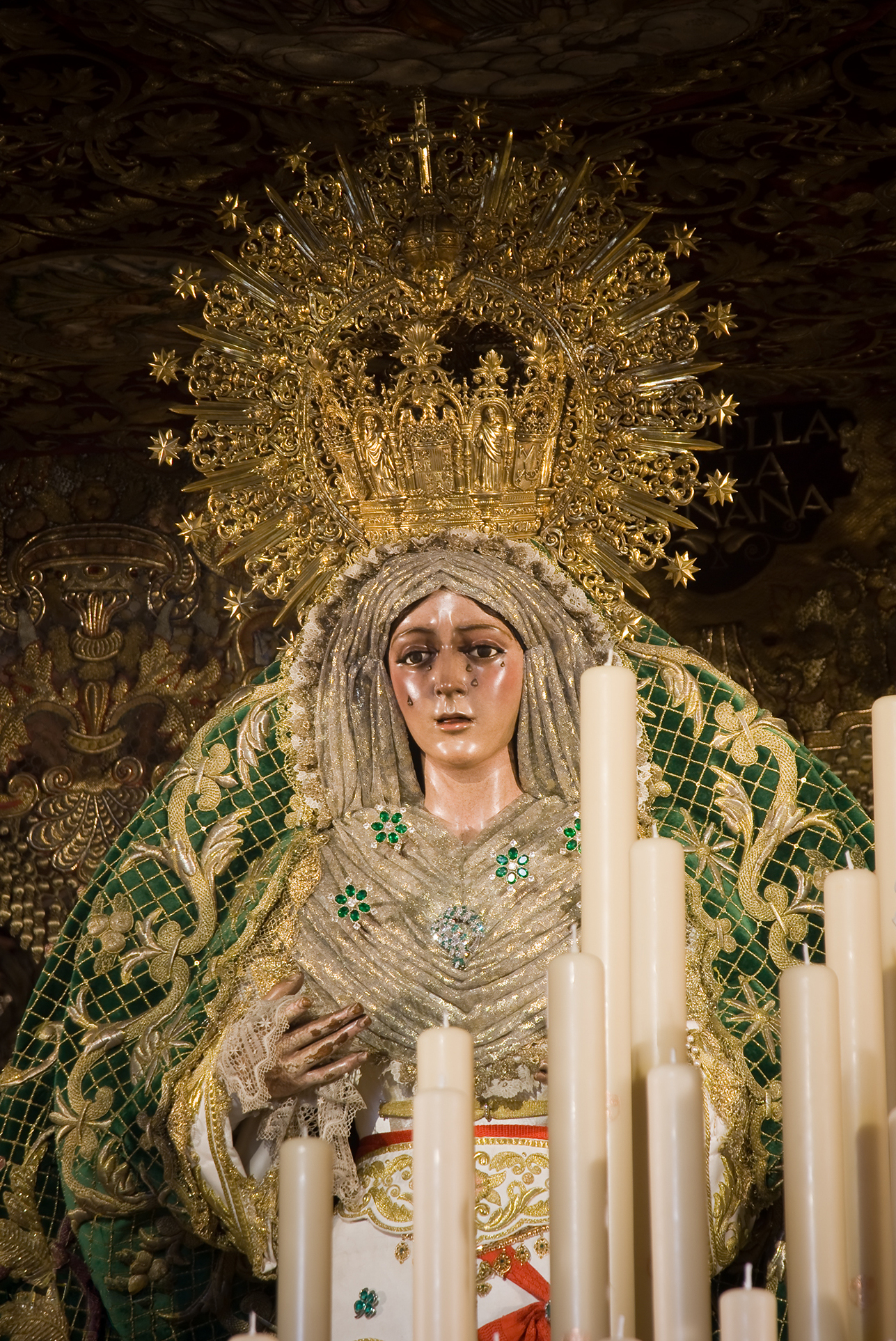
- The Macarena in 2010
- Location: Sevilla, Spain
- Date: 18 December
- Witness: Pedro Roldán, José Gómez Ortega
- Type: Marian art
- Approval: Pope John XXIII (1963); Pope Francis (2024)
- Shrine: Basilica of La Macarena, Seville
- Patronage: People of Sevilla, bullfighters, Calé, tailors, embroiderers and liver donors.
- Attributes: Our Lady of Sorrows holding a handkerchief, rosary and five emerald brooches

Mary Most Holy of Hope Macarena (Spanish: María Santísima de la Esperanza Macarena), popularly known as the Virgin of Macarena or simply La Macarena, is a Roman Catholic title of the Blessed Virgin Mary associated with a pious 17th century wooden image of the Blessed Virgin venerated in the Basilica of La Macarena in Sevilla, Spain. The Marian title falls under a category of Our Lady of Sorrows commemorating the desolate grievance and piety of the Virgin Mary during Holy Week. The image is widely considered as a national treasure by the Spanish people, primarily because of its religious grandeur during Lenten celebrations.

The image is also known for local folklore, most notably its discolored cheek allegedly caused by a bottle of wine thrown by a drunken Protestant rebel at her face which pious legend also claims has never been able to be removed. Its popularity among the masses is often highlighted in the five Rose-Emerald brooches attached to her dress given by the famed bullfighter José Gómez Ortega, also known as Joselito, and the historical fact that the image has only worn an entirely black vestment ensemble once, during Joselito's death and funeral in 1920.

The feast of the image is celebrated in Spain on 18 December and was granted a canonical coronation on 31 May 1964 by Pope John XXIII via Cardinal José Bueno María y Monreal. The Virgin of Macarena is commonly considered the patroness of bullfighters and the Romani of Spain who hold a sincere devotion to the image. It is currently enshrined in the high altar of the Basilica of La Macarena.

== History ==
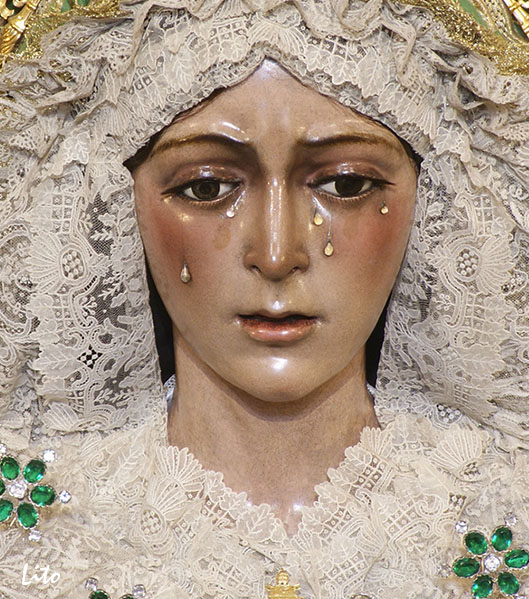
A close-up on the face of the image. Later restorations enhanced the cheekbones to masquerade the alleged stain on the cheeks. Note the five emerald mariquillas or brooches donated by the bullfighter El Gallo.

The image's genuine authorship is unknown and widely disputed; often by art schools who wish to claim ownership of its artistic style called Encarnación. A similar image of the Virgin Mary and crucified Jesus was certainly in existence by 1654 by santero artist Pedro Nieto. Religious images of this type was a result of baroque reforms between 1670 and 1680 by the Confraternity of the Macarena.

The scholarly attribution of the image is to the artist Pedro Roldán or one of his protégés in his workshop. Three other famous sculptors and their schools place claim on the image. Over time, the image fell into disrepair, but was officially restored in March 1881 by Emilio Pizzaro de la Cruz, who created new arms and hands; it was restored again in 1883.

By the early 20th century, the famous gold-embroiderer Juan Manuel Rodríguez Ojeda, a member of the Confraternity of the Macarena devoted his work to the image as a gesture of thanksgiving. Between 1899 and 1900, the image began to showcase a mantle made of gold embroidery, French wire bullion and gold-plated tin, popularly referred to as a "mesh cape".

By 1908, a canopy of red velvet was added to protect the image from weather conditions, and was restored in 1964. Various crowns and accessories were repeatedly redesigned in 1938, 1953 and 1963.

A new cape was made in 1930, which was unique because the color emerald green was also used along with gold tones. King Alfonso XIII of Spain promoted its devotion by issuing a regal document on the image after being inducted into the fraternity in 1904. In the same year on 11 April, Cardinal Eustaquio Ilundáin y Esteban once again blessed the image and its new cape.

Folklore recounts how allegedly a Protestant rebel who drank (drinking is allowed in some religious processions) and then threw a wine bottle at the image sometime before the 1950s. He became a pallbearer for the image the following year as penance for his sacrilegious act.

The image was granted a canonical coronation on 27 March 1913 by Cardinal Enrique Almaraz y Santos, who added the five emerald brooches donated by the bullfighter El Gallo. A similar coronation was also repeated in 1964 by the Archbishop of Seville.

In May 2025, the Confraternity of the Macarena asked Francisco Arquillo Torres, a professor of restoration at the University of Seville, to work on the statue, attempting at a "quick fix" in June. This resulted in the statue having longer eye lashes, altered skin tones, and a different facial expression, causing an uproar across Spain. As of August 2025, the statue has been removed from the basilica, and a new restoration led by conservator Pedro Manzano is attempting to undo the controversial changes. This work is expected to take months. The Virgin returned to Seville and was on display from Monday, December 8, 2025. The Basilica was opened at 6:00 a.m., and a crowd rushed towards the main altar seeking the face of the Virgin.

== Arson attempt ==
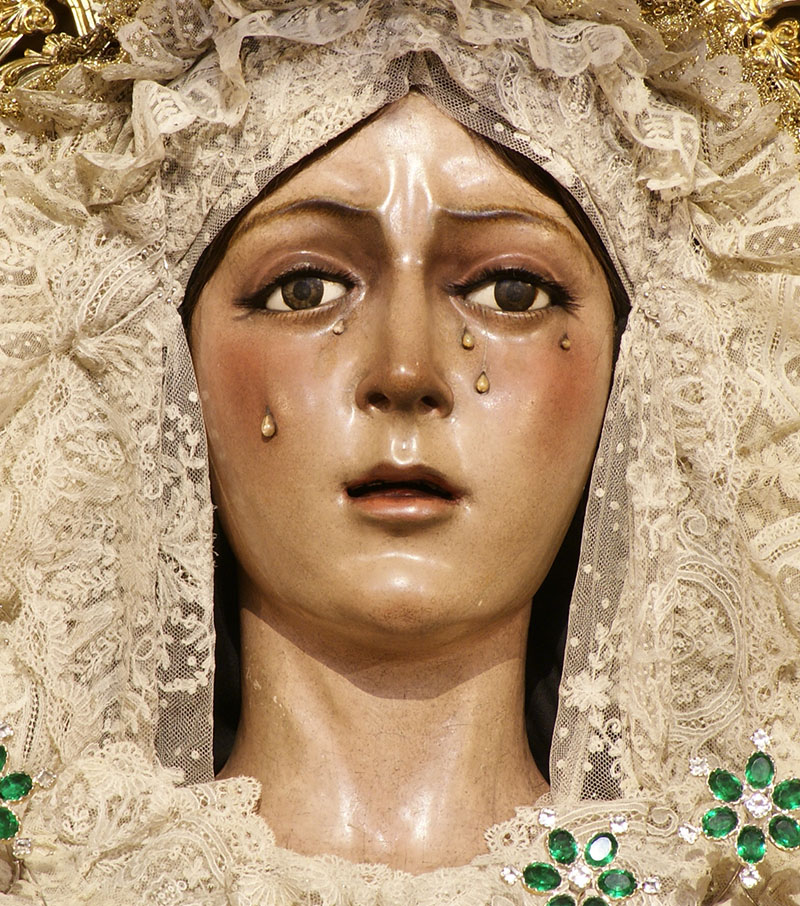
Closeup of the venerated Marian image with her famous emerald brooches.

During the Spanish Civil War, anti-clerical arsonists entered on the early dawn of 18 July 1936 attempting to destroy the images inside the Macarena Church and its oratory. Out of fear, the people hid the images of Our Lord of Judgment and Our Lady of the Holy Rosary in a storeroom underneath the church steps. Historically, religious images that are threatened by war or famine are often secretly buried underground for safekeeping. The Macarena image was stripped of its vestments and taken anonymously to a member of the Confraternity for safekeeping. Due to the warring factions at the time, the Confraternity was expelled and was forced to move into the Church of the Annunciation.

== Details of the image ==
The image belongs to an anonymous sculptor dating back to 1680, and measures 175 centimeters. It is a mannequin-style image made of pine wood and cypress. The image features a sorrowful face with glass teardrops, along with a human hair wig and downward gaze. It has an open mouth complete with tongue and teeth. The image holds a mourning handkerchief (right) and Rosary (left). It also possesses a gold medal given by the mayor of the city from 1971.

== Church Recognition ==
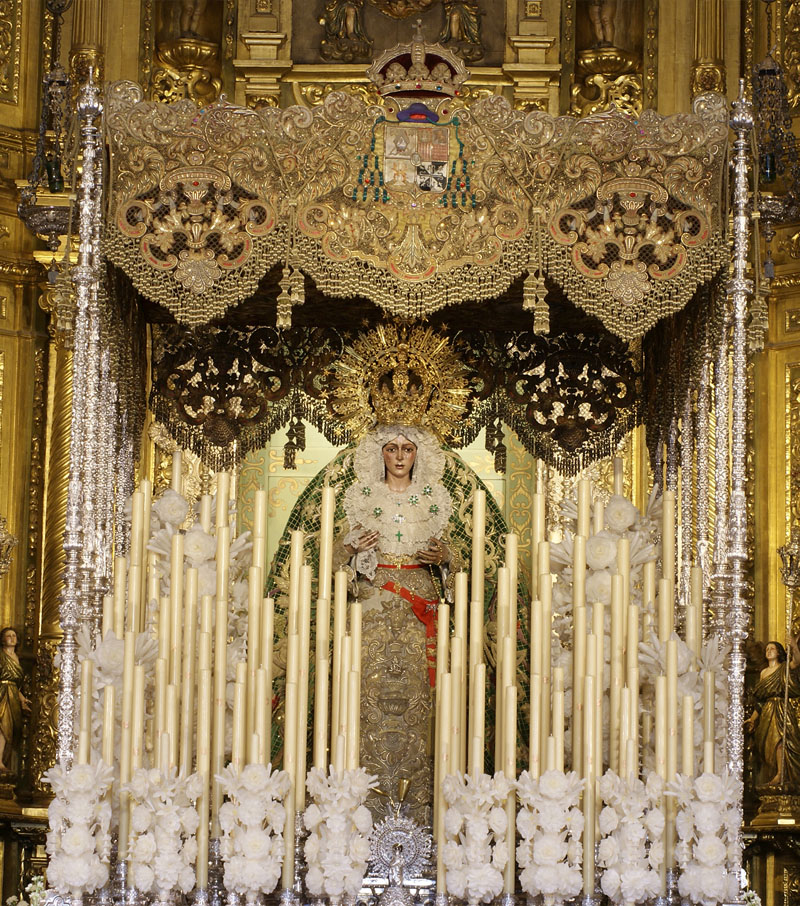
The canopy or Pallio of the Macarena filled with imperial regalia and expensive and costly textiles. A statue of Our Lady of the Pillar, patroness of Zaragoza, Spain is located in the front.

Religious images of widespread devotions are often venerated in Spain through papal-designated ceremonies called canonical coronation. On 20 December 1962, the Confraternity of Macarena petitioned Pope John XXIII to grant a coronation. On 17 February 1963, the Pontiff answered this request with through Cardinal Paolo Marella; who agreed to move the image on 27 May 1964 to the Cathedral of Seville for a Triduum feast and Holy Mass. A High Pontifical Mass was celebrated and attended by then-head-of-state, Francisco Franco.

On 3 December 2024, Pope Francis through his special envoy Archbishop Edgar Peña Parra presented a golden rose before the image, the last one of his pontificate.

Because recreating this image is considered very costly and painstaking, images of this title is often seen rare and limited. Other sanctioned copies under this particular Marian title alone have also been reproduced in other pious Catholic countries, namely in Colombia (7), Brazil (2), Uruguay (1), Venezuela (4), Peru (2) and the Philippines (2).

== Bibliography ==
- Las cofradías de Sevilla en la modernidad; ISBN 84-472-0509-6
