= Basilica of La Macarena =

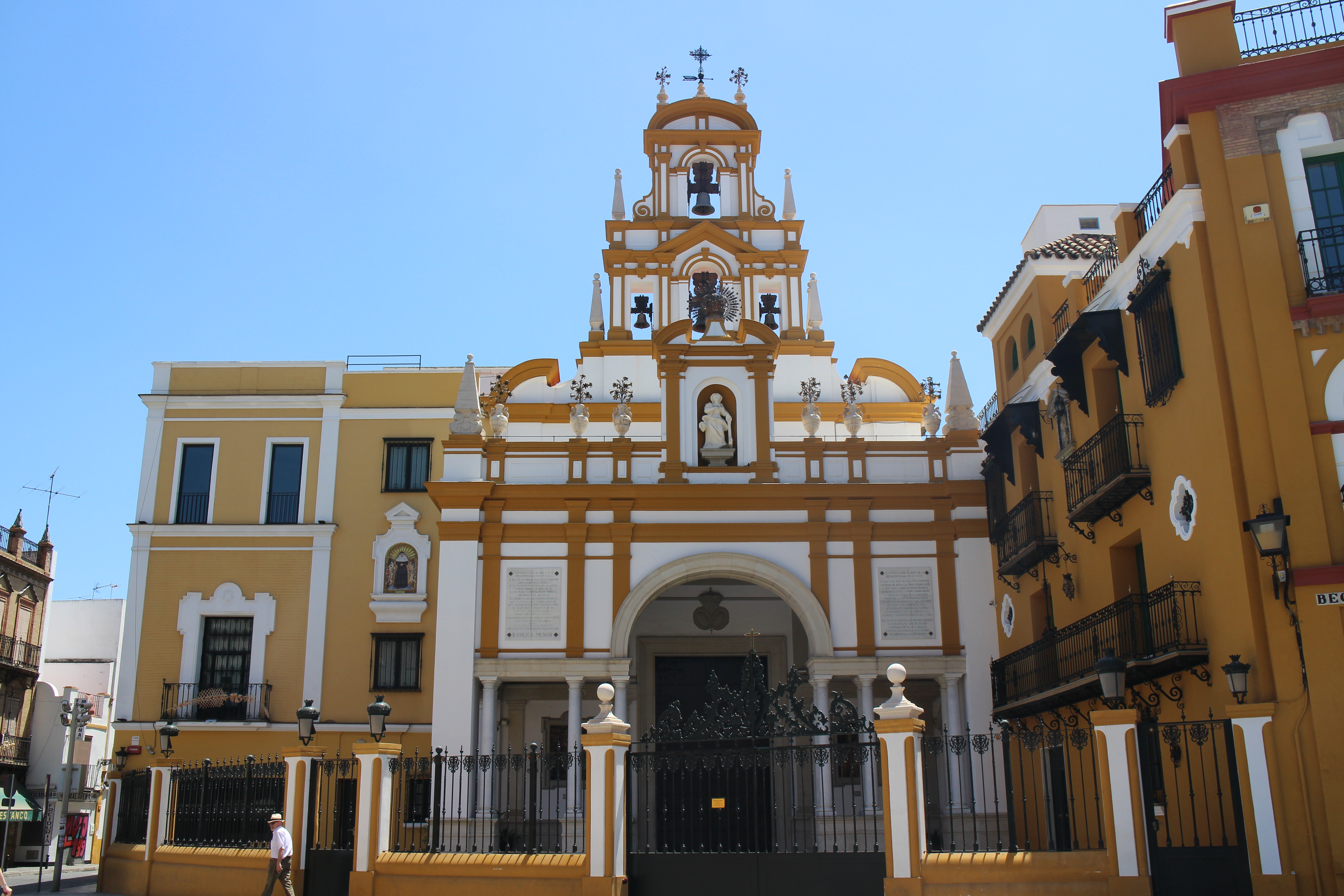
- Exterior of the Basilica of La Macarena
- Basilica of La Macarena
- 37.4025°N 5.98944444°W
- Location: Seville, Spain
- Denomination: Catholic

History
- Founded: 1941
- Dedication: Virgin of Hope of Macarena

Architecture
- Architect: Aurelio Gómez Millán
- Architectural type: Baroque Revival

Administration
- Archdiocese: Archdiocese of Seville

The Basilica of La Macarena (Spanish: Basílica de Santa María de la Esperanza Macarena) is a Catholic church in the Macarena neighborhood, in the Old Town district of the city of Seville, Spain. It houses the Virgin of Hope of Macarena and Jesús de la Sentencia sculptures and is the seat of the Brotherhood of the Macarena (Hermandad de la Macarena), a confraternity.

Located in front of the Basilica of La Macarena is the Macarena Gate, one of the few vestiges that remain behind what were the walls of Seville.

== History ==
The church was founded in 1941. Archbishop Pedro Segura y Sáenz blessed the land for the church and placed the first stone. The building was designed by Sevillan architect Aurelio Gómez Millán. Construction finished in 1949.

On October 7, 1966, Cardinal José Bueno y Monreal dedicated the church as a minor basilica.

In October 2009, a new museum of the basilica was inaugurated by Cardinal Carlos Amigo Vallejo, the mayor of the city, Alfredo Sánchez Monteseirín, and by Juan Ruíz Cardenas, superior brother of the Brotherhood of the Macarena. The museum offers a vision of the Holy Week in Seville and presents processional and liturgical objects accumulated by the brotherhood.
