= Pedro Segura y Sáenz =

Spanish cardinal

His Eminence Pedro Segura y Sáenz
- Archbishop of Seville
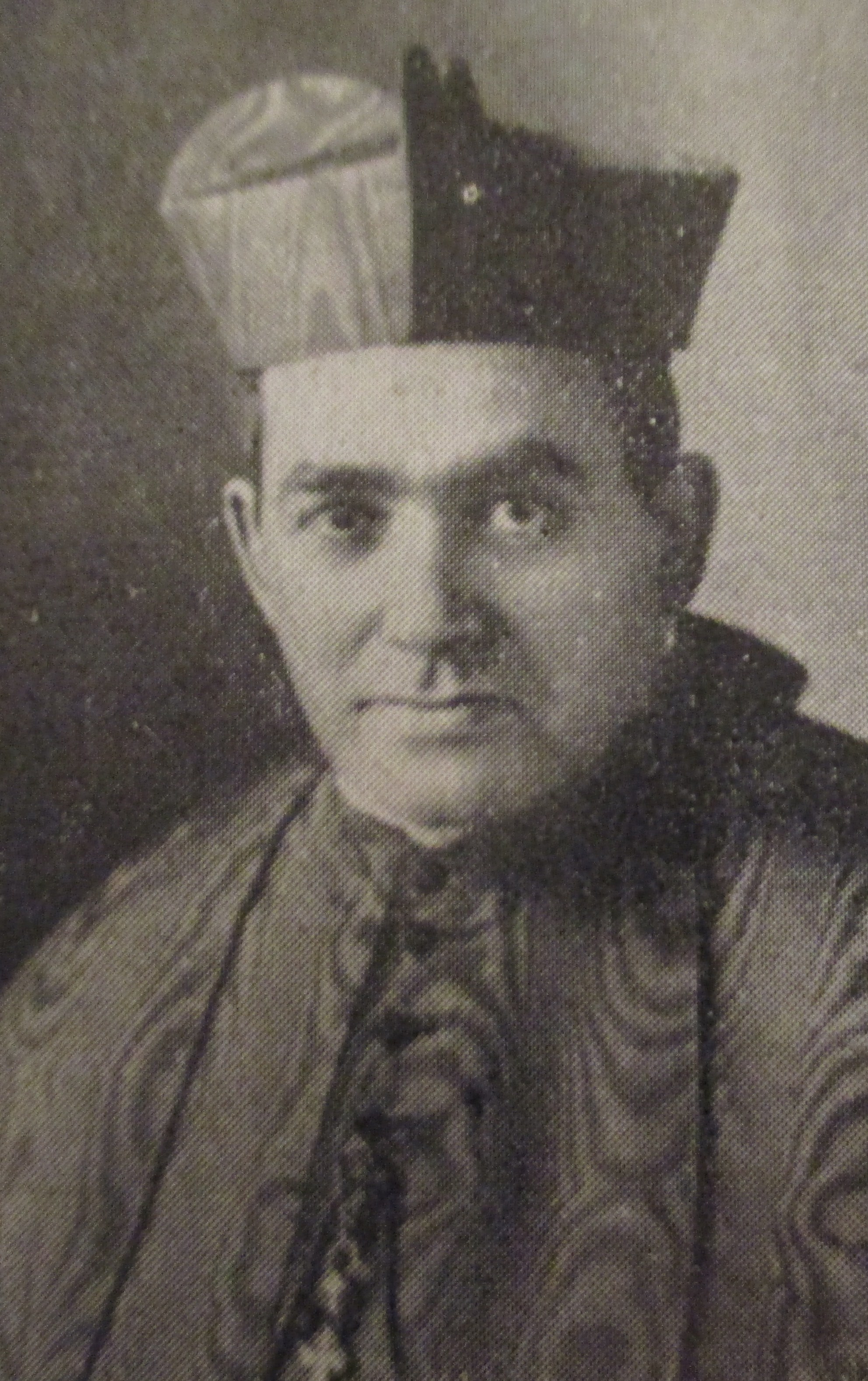
- Cardinal Segura in 1939.
- Church: Roman Catholic Church
- Archdiocese: Seville
- See: Seville
- Appointed: 14 September 1937
- Installed: 2 October 1937
- Term ended: 8 April 1957
- Predecessor: Eustaquio Ilundáin y Esteban
- Successor: José María Bueno y Monreal
- Other post: Cardinal-Priest of Santa Maria in Trastevere (1929–57)
- Previous posts: Titular Bishop of Apollonia (1916–20); Auxiliary Bishop of Valladolid (1916–20); Bishop of Coria (1920–26); Archbishop of Burgos (1926–27); Archbishop of Toledo (1927–31)

Orders
- Ordination: 9 June 1906
- Consecration: 13 June 1916 by José María Cos y Macho
- Created cardinal: 19 December 1927 by Pope Pius XI
- Rank: Cardinal-Priest

Personal details
- Born: Pedro Segura y Sáenz; 4 December 1880 Carazo, Osma, Kingdom of Spain
- Died: 8 April 1957 (aged 76) Nuestra Señora del Rosario hospital, Madrid, Francoist Spain
- Parents: Santiago Segura y Arroyo; Juliana Sáenz y Camarero
- Motto: Solo virtud es nobleza (Only virtue is nobility)
- Coat of arms

Styles of Pedro Segura y Sáenz
- Reference style: His Eminence
- Spoken style: Your Eminence
- Religious style: Cardinal
- Informal style: Cardinal
- See: Seville

Pedro Segura y Sáenz (4 December 1880 – 8 April 1957) was a Spanish Cardinal of the Roman Catholic Church who served as Archbishop of Toledo from 1927 to 1931, and Archbishop of Seville from 1937 until 1954. Segura was elevated to the cardinalate in 1927.

== Biography ==
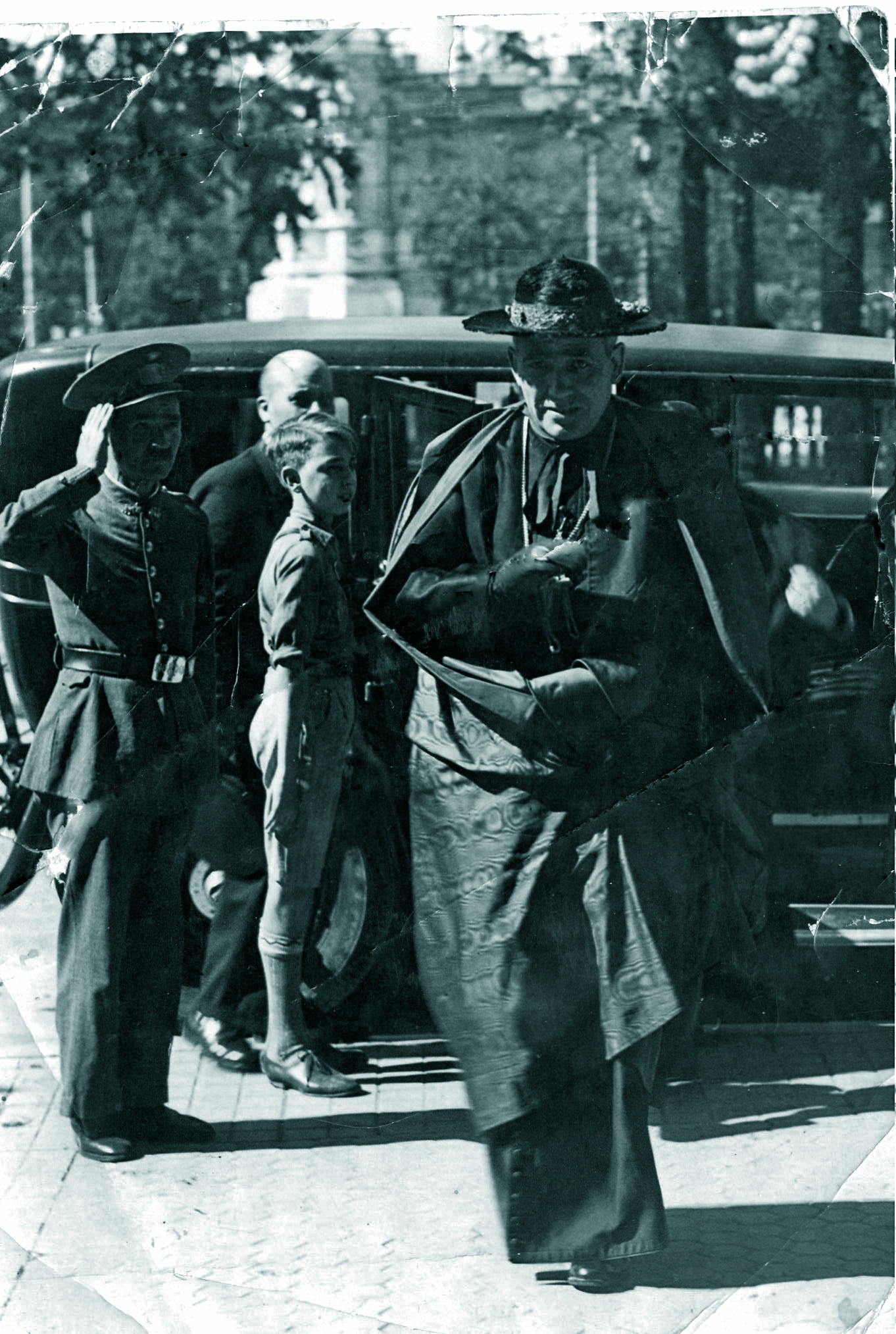
Cardinal Segura saluted by a policeman in Seville, around 1950.

Born in Carazo in 1880, Pedro Segura y Sáenz attended the seminary in Burgos and the Pontifical University of Comillas before being ordained to the priesthood on 9 June 1906. He then did pastoral work in Burgos, at whose seminary he also taught. In 1912, Segura was made a professor at the Pontifical University of Valladolid, of which he was also Prefect of Studies, and a cathedral canon. He also served in the archdiocesan curia, including holding the post of Director of Works.

On 14 March 1916 Segura was appointed Auxiliary Bishop of Valladolid and Titular Bishop of Apollonia. He received his episcopal consecration on the following 13 June from Cardinal José Cos y Macho, with Bishops Vicente Sánchez de Castro and Julián de Diego y García Alcolea serving as co-consecrators. He became Bishop of Coria on 10 July 1920. After being promoted to Archbishop of Burgos on 20 December 1926, Segura was named Archbishop of Toledo by Pope Pius XI on 19 December 1927. In virtue of his position as Archbishop of Toledo, he was also Primate of Spain.

Segura was created Cardinal-Priest of Santa Maria in Trastevere by Pope Pius XI in the consistory of 19 December the same year. As he could not attend the actual ceremony, he later received his red hat personally from Pius on 28 October 1929. In July 1931, the Primate was sent into exile in France by the Republican government he had publicly denounced while extolling the monarchy. He resigned as Toledo's archbishop on the following 26 September and was made Archbishop of Seville on 14 September 1937 on the death of Navarrese Cardinal Eustaquio Ilundain y Esteban. The Cardinal was one of the electors who participated in the 1939 papal conclave, which selected Pope Pius XII.

A staunch conservative, Segura upheld the Church's teaching in the December 1864 Syllabus of Errors by Pope Pius IX, condemning separation of Church and state, especially opposing toleration of Protestants, and condemned the belief "that all religions are equally acceptable in the presence of God". He also described the Inquisition as "meritorious", and prohibited Sevillian Catholics from attending movies and dances. He likewise opposed giving the vote to the 5,000,000 women in Spain over the age of 21.

Late in his administration, a series of pamphlets were distributed which were seen as attacking Segura's enemies, who were considered to include the Pope and the Spanish nuncio. Segura was considered to have been the source of the pamphlets. The Holy See applauded the Chapter of Seville Cathedral's condemnation of these leaflets. The appointment of José Bueno y Monreal as coadjutor archbishop by the Vatican was seen as response to the publication of the pamphlets. In November 1954 Segura was recalled from his position by the Vatican but refused to leave the Archiepiscopal Palace and had to be removed by police.

The author Laurie Lee on page 40 of his book A Rose for Winter, describes a mass he attended in 1949 at Seville Cathedral which was presided over by the Archbishop.

Segura died from a kidney ailment in Madrid, at age 76. He is buried in Cerro del Sagrado Corazón.

Catholic Church titles
Preceded by Ramón Peris Mencheta	Bishop of Coria; 1920–1926	Succeeded by Dionisio Moreno y Barrio
Preceded by Juan Benlloch y Vivó	Archbishop of Burgos; 20 December 1926 – 19 December 1927	Succeeded by Manuel de Castro y Alonso
Preceded by Enrique Reig y Casanova	Archbishop of Toledo; 19 December 1927 – 26 September 1931	Succeeded by Isidro Goma y Tomas
Preceded by Eustaquio Ilundáin y Esteban	Archbishop of Seville; 14 September 1937 – 8 April 1957	Succeeded by José Bueno y Monreal
