= Bernardo Francisco de Hoyos de Seña =

Blessed Bernardo de Hoyos S.J.
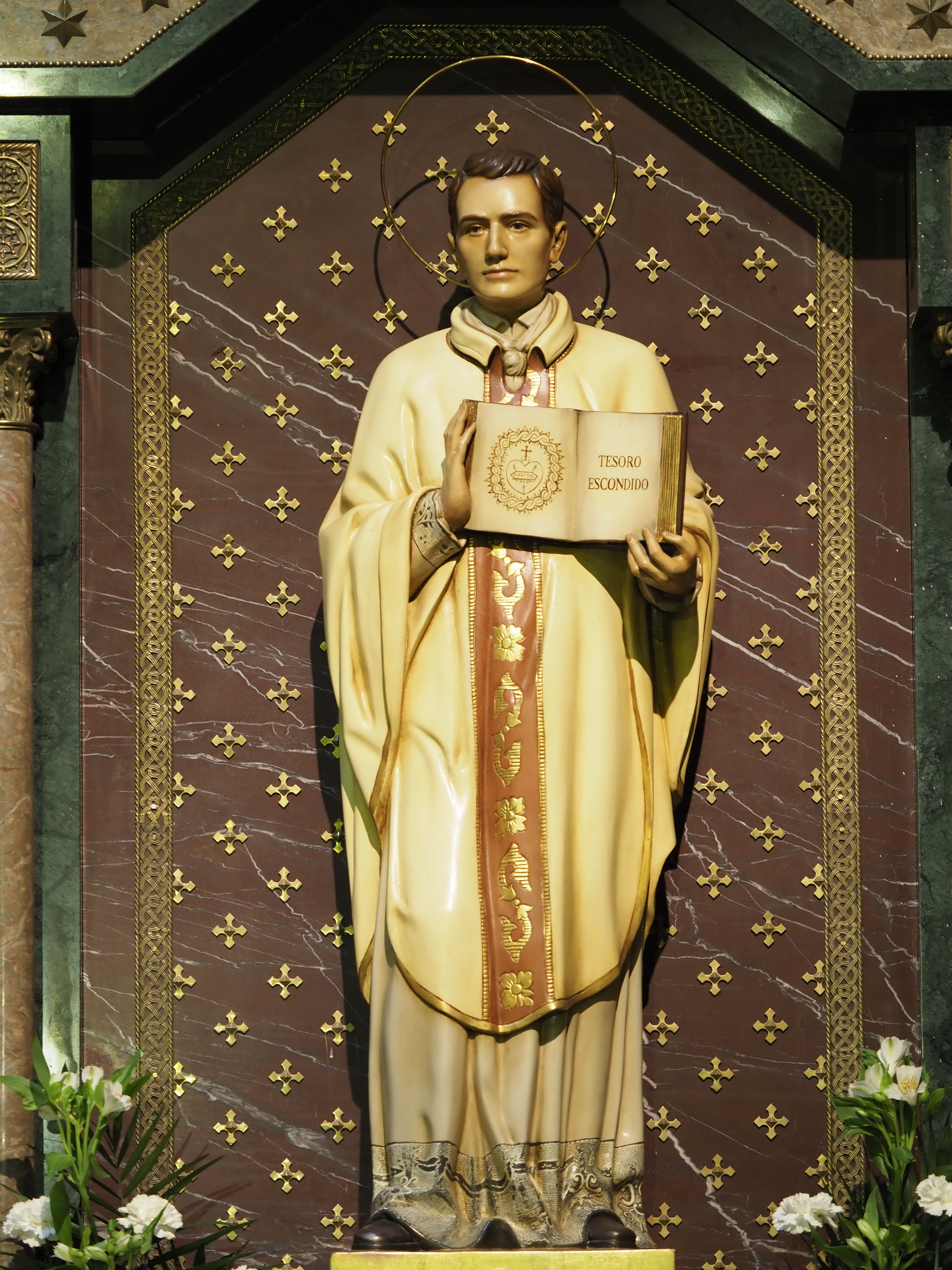

Priest
- Born: 21 August 1711; Torrelobatón, Valladolid, Kingdom of Spain
- Died: 29 November 1735 (aged 24); Valladolid, Kingdom of Spain
- Venerated in: Catholic Church
- Beatified: 18 April 2010, Plaza de Colón, Valladolid, Spain by Archbishop Angelo Amato
- Feast: 29 November
- Attributes: Priest's cassock

Bernardo Francisco de Hoyos de Seña, SJ (21 August 1711 – 29 November 1735), best known simply as Bernardo de Hoyos, was a Spanish Catholic priest, mystic and member of the Society of Jesus. He is best known for his ardent devotion to the Sacred Heart and for his constant promotion of it until his premature death.

His beatification by the Catholic Church was held in Valladolid on 18 April 2010.

== Life ==
Bernardo Francisco de Hoyos de Seña was born on 21 August 1711 to Don Manuel de Hoyos and Doña Francisca de Seña. He was baptized on 6 September in his local parish church in the names of "Bernardo Francisco Javier"; he was named in honor of Bernard of Clairvaux and Francis Xavier. His father worked at the town hall at Torrelobatón near Valladolid. He received his Confirmation in 1720.

He entered the Jesuit colleges of Medina del Campo and Villagarcía de Campos and later entered the novitiate under the direction of Félix de Vargas on 11 July 1726. He took his simple vows in 1728. He underwent philosophical studies at the College of San Pedro y San Pablo in Medina del Campo. In September 1731 he started began his theological studies at the College of San Ambrosio in Valladolid. He had spiritual experiences and revelations about the Sacred Heart of Jesus that led him to spread this devotion and worship. He was ordained to the priesthood on 2 January 1735 with a special dispensation as he was not old enough. On 6 January 1735 he celebrated his first Mass in the College of San Ignacio.

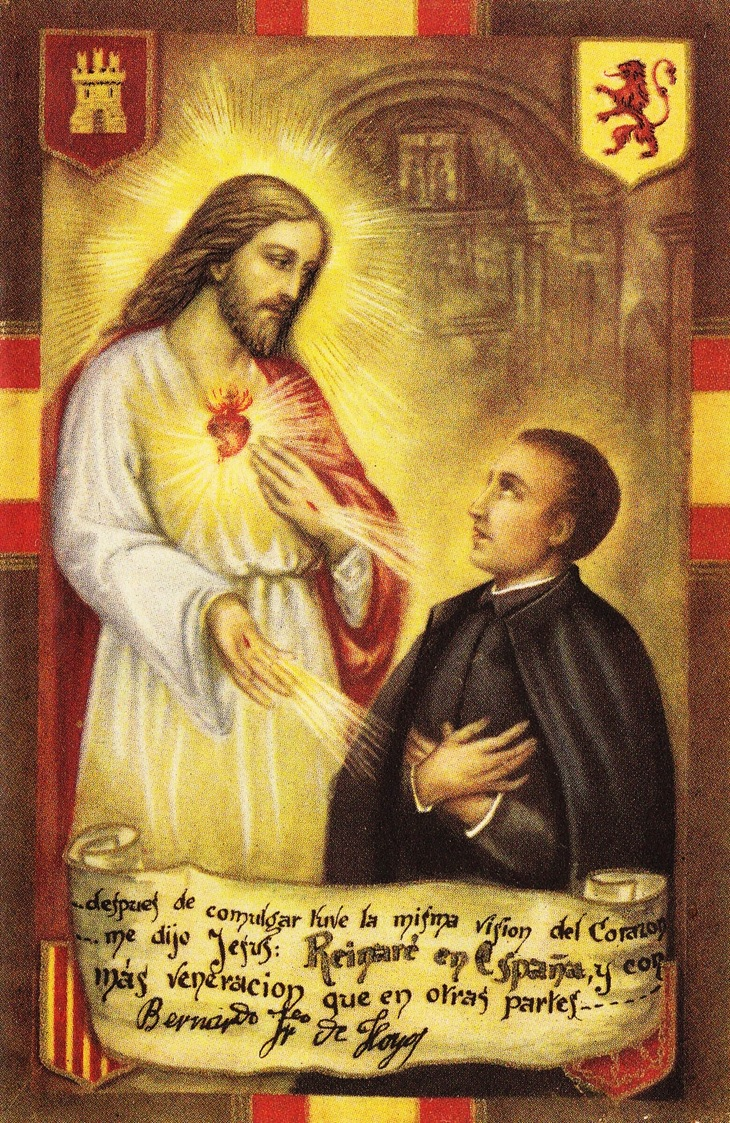
The Sacred Heart of Jesus with Bernardo de Hoyos

In late April 1733 he received a letter from his friend Augustine Cadaveraz (in Bilbao) after he had requested the priest to translate a Latin chapter on Corpus Christi from Joseph de Gallifet's book "On Devotion to the Sacred Heart of Jesus". On 3 May 1733 he took the book from the library of the house and took it to his room where he began to read it; the Sacred Heart both inspired and illuminated him. On 4 May he reported receiving a vision from Jesus Christ who said to him: "I wish for you to spread the devotion to My Sacred Heart throughout all of Spain". Christ returned to him in another vision on 14 May. On 12 June 1733 he consecrated himself to the Sacred Heart using the same formula that Claude La Colombière used. He distributed leaflets for the devotion and even wrote a letter to King Philip V asking for his support in requesting the Holy See to approve a special feast for the Sacred Heart.

In 1726 both Aloysius Gonzaga and Stanislaus Kostka were both canonized by Pope Benedict XIII; the two became models of holiness for the Jesuit priest as well as John Berchmans who was already on the course for canonization. Berchmans in particular was a main influence on him.

He fell ill with typhus and he died on 29 November 1735 at the Colegio de San Ignacio; his condition had grown worse from 19 November onwards. His remains were buried in the College of San Ignacio; they were later removed to an unknown place.

== Beatification ==
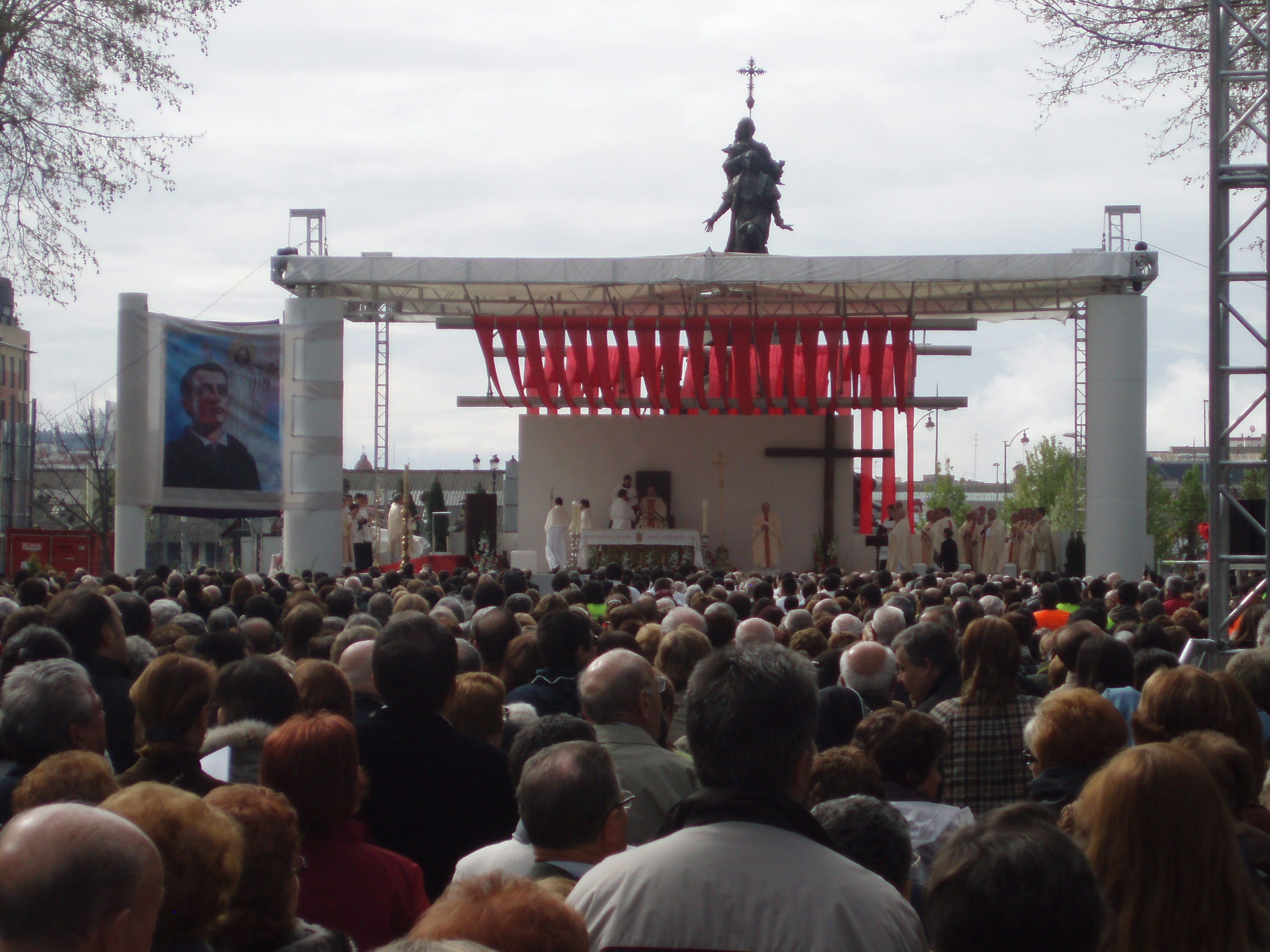
Bernardo's beatification in 2010.

The beatification process started in the Archdiocese of Valladolid in an informative process that Cardinal Antonio María Cascajares y Azara inaugurated on 17 October 1895 and later closed in 1899. His writings received the approval of theologians on 7 June 1902. An apostolic process was also held in Valladolid that Cardinal José Cos y Macho oversaw from 1914 until 1919. The formal introduction to the cause came on 11 February 1914 under Pope Pius X and the late Jesuit priest was made a Servant of God.

Historians assessed and approved the cause on 31 May 1961 while the postulation submitted the Positio to the Congregation for the Causes of Saints in 1990. Theologians assented to the cause later on 27 June 1995 as did the C.C.S. on 12 December 1995. Pope John Paul II named him as Venerable on 12 January 1996 after confirming that the late Jesuit priest had lived a life of heroic virtue. The process for a miracle spanned in Spain from 11 November 1947 to 8 October 1949 while being validated on 1 March 1996; the miracle in question was the cure of Mercedes Cabezas on 22 April 1936 from typhoid and a serious tumor in San Cristóbal de la Cuesta in Salamanca. A medical board approved this on 13 March 2008 with theologians doing likewise on 7 July 2008 and the C.C.S. soon after on 18 November 2008. Pope Benedict XVI approved this on 17 January 2009 and delegated Archbishop Angelo Amato to preside over the beatification in Spain on 18 April 2010.

The current postulator for the cause is the Jesuit priest Anton Witwer.

== See also ==
- Visions of Jesus and Mary
