= Victoriano Guisasola y Menéndez =

Catholic cardinal from Spain

His Eminence Victoriano Guisasola y Menéndez
- Archbishop of Toledo; Patriarch of Indias Occidentales
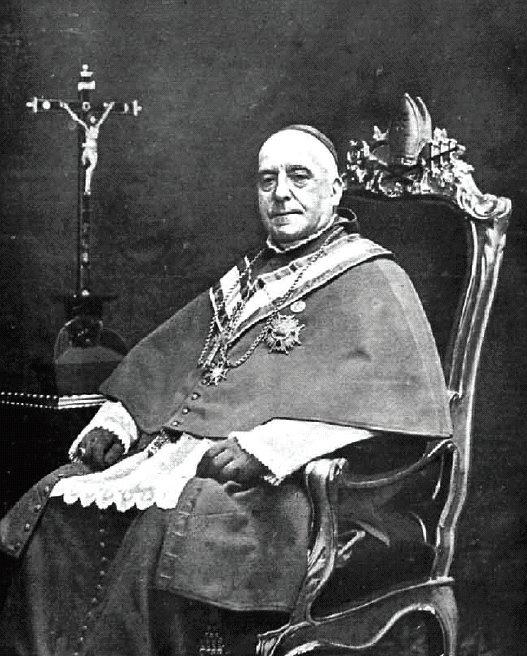
- Church: Roman Catholic Church
- Archdiocese: Toledo
- See: Toledo
- Appointed: 1 January 1914
- Term ended: 2 September 1920
- Predecessor: Gregorio María Aguirre y García
- Successor: Enrique Almaraz y Santos
- Other post: Cardinal-Priest of Santi Quattro Coronati (1914–20)
- Previous posts: Bishop of Osma (1893–97); Bishop of Jaén (1897–1901); Bishop of Madrid y Alcalá de Henares (1901–05); Archbishop of Valencia (1905–14)

Orders
- Ordination: October 1876 by Victoriano Guisasola y Rodríguez
- Consecration: 1 October 1893 by José María Martín de Herrera y de la Iglesia
- Created cardinal: 25 May 1914 by Pope Pius X
- Rank: Cardinal-Priest

Personal details
- Born: Victoriano Guisasola y Menéndez; 21 April 1852 Oviedo, Spanish Kingdom
- Died: 2 September 1920 (aged 68) Madrid, Kingdom of Spain
- Parents: José Guisasola Rodríguez; María Felipa Menéndez Palacio
- Education: University of Oviedo
- Motto: Labora sicut bonus miles Christi Jesu
- Coat of arms

Styles of Victoriano Guisasola y Menendez
- Reference style: His Eminence
- Spoken style: Your Eminence
- Informal style: Cardinal
- See: Toledo

Victoriano Guisasola y Menéndez J.C.D. (21 April 1852 – 2 September 1920) was a Cardinal of the Roman Catholic Church and an archbishop of Toledo and Primate of Spain.

== Early life and priesthood ==
Victoriano Guisasola y Menéndez was born in Oviedo, Spain. He was the nephew of Victoriano Guisasola Rodríguez, Archbishop of Santiago de Compostela. He was educated at the Seminary of Oviedo and the University of Santiago de Compostela, where he earned a licentiate in theology and a doctorate in canon law.

He was ordained in 1876 by his uncle. He served as Professor of canon law at the Seminary of Ciudad Real from 1876 until 1882. He was chancellor-secretary to his uncle the bishop of Orihuela from 1882 until 1884. He served as vicar general of Orihuela until 1886.

== Episcopate ==
He was appointed bishop of Osma on 15 June 1893 by Pope Leo XIII. He was consecrated on 1 October 1893 at the cathedral of Santiago de Compostela by José María Martín de Herrera y de la Iglesia, Cardinal Archbishop of Compostela. He was transferred to the Diocese of Jaén on 19 April 1897. He was appointed in 1899 as a Senator of the kingdom, a post he held until his death. He was transferred to the diocese of Madrid in December 1901. He was promoted to Archdiocese of Valencia on 14 December 1905. He was finally transferred to the metropolitan and primatial see of Toledo on 1 January 1914 by Pope Pius X.

== Cardinalate ==
He was made a cardinal in the consistory of 25 May 1914 but Pius X did not assign him a title before his death; his successor, Pope Benedict XV, made him the Cardinal-Priest of Santi Quattro Coronati (the pope's former title). He received the red biretta from King Alfonso XIII of Spain on June 3 of that year. He participated in the conclave of 1914 that elected Pope Benedict XV.

He died in 1920 while still in office and is buried at the chapel of the Seminary of Toledo.

== Recognition ==
Menéndez was awarded the Order of Isabella the Catholic; he was also recognised by the Academy of History.

Menéndez wrote many letters and newspaper articles during his life. His works are published in 25 volumes.

Catholic Church titles
Preceded by Pedro María Lagüera Menezo	Bishop of Osma; 15 Jun 1893 – 19 Apr 1897	Succeeded by José María García Escudero y Ubago
Preceded by Manuel María León González y Sánchez	Bishop of Jaen; 19 Apr 1897 – 16 Dec 1901	Succeeded by Salvador Castellote y Pinazo
Preceded by José Cos y Macho	Bishop of Madrid; 16 December 1901 – 14 December 1905	Succeeded by José Maria Salvador y Barrera
Preceded by Bernardino Nozaleda y Villa	Archbishop of Valencia; 14 Dec 1905 – 1 January 1914	Succeeded by Valeriano Menéndez y Conde
Preceded by Gregorio María Aguirre y García	Archbishop of Toledo; 1 January 1914 – 2 September 1920	Succeeded by Enrique Almaraz y Santos
