= Gregorio María Aguirre y García =

His Eminence Gregorio María Aguirre y Garcia O.F.M. Disc.
- Archbishop of Toledo; Patriarch of Indias Occidentales
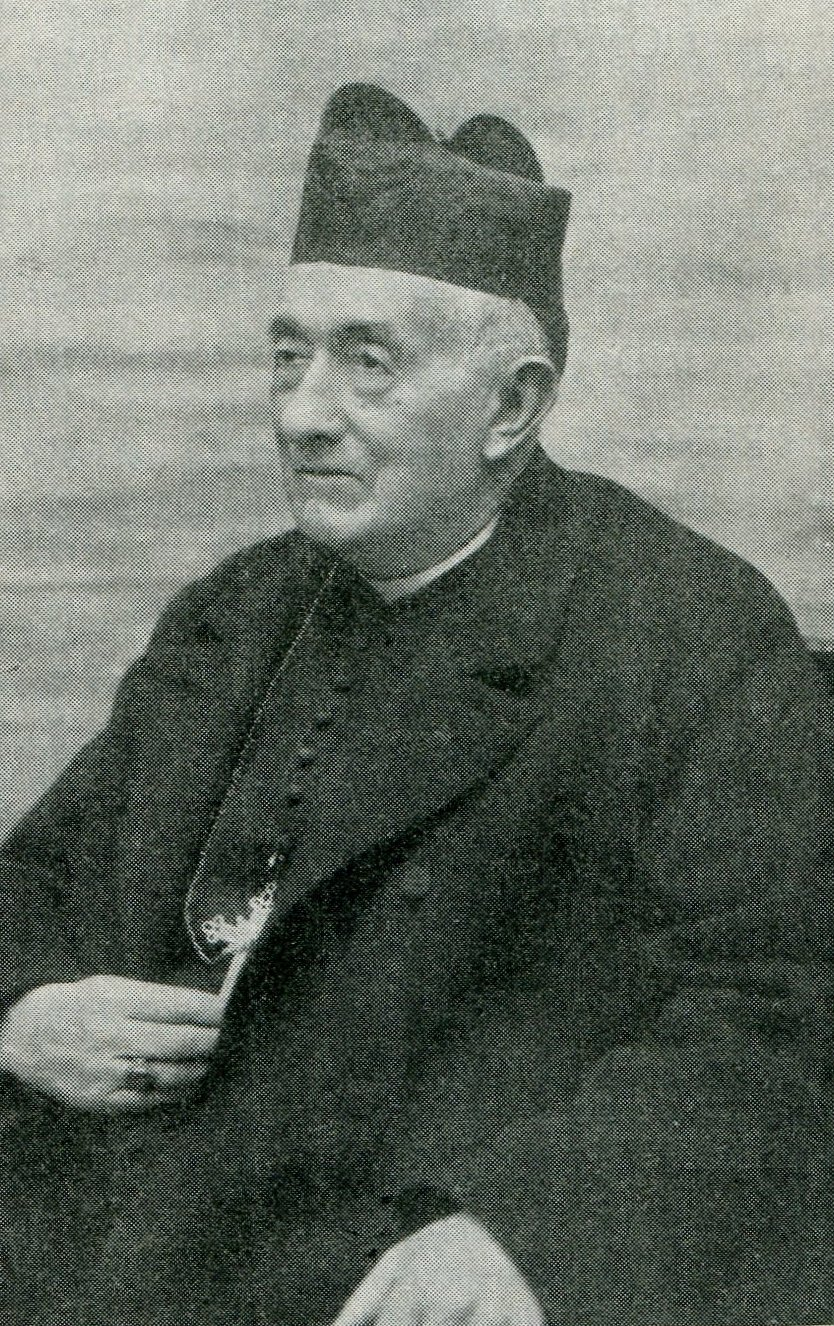
- Church: Roman Catholic Church
- Archdiocese: Toledo
- See: Toledo
- Appointed: 29 April 1909
- Term ended: 10 October 1913
- Predecessor: Ciriaco María Sancha y Hervás
- Successor: Victoriano Guisasola y Menéndez
- Other post: Cardinal-Priest of San Giovanni a Porta Latina (1907–13)
- Previous posts: Bishop of Lugo (1885–94); Archbishop of Burgos (1894–1909); Apostolic Administrator of Calahorra y La Calzada (1899–1909)

Orders
- Ordination: September 1859 by Cirilo de Alameda y Brea
- Consecration: 21 June 1885 by Mariano Rampolla del Tindaro
- Created cardinal: 15 April 1907 by Pope Pius X
- Rank: Cardinal-Priest

Personal details
- Born: Gregorio María Aguirre y García; 12 March 1835 Pola de Gordón, Spanish Kingdom
- Died: 10 October 1913 (aged 78) Toledo, Kingdom of Spain
- Buried: Toledo Cathedral
- Parents: Tomá Aguirre de la Canal; Anastasia García Álvarez
- Motto: Misericordia ejus respexit humilitatem

Styles of Gregorio Maria Aguirre y Garcia
- Reference style: His Eminence
- Spoken style: Your Eminence
- Informal style: Cardinal
- See: Toledo

Gregorio María Aguirre y García (12 March 1835 – 10 October 1913) was a Cardinal of the Roman Catholic Church and Archbishop of Toledo and Primate of Spain.

== Biography ==
=== Early life and education ===
Gregorio María Aguirre y García was born in La Pola de Gordón, León Province; he was educated at the Seminary of Leon, and the Colegio de Pastrana.

=== Priesthood ===
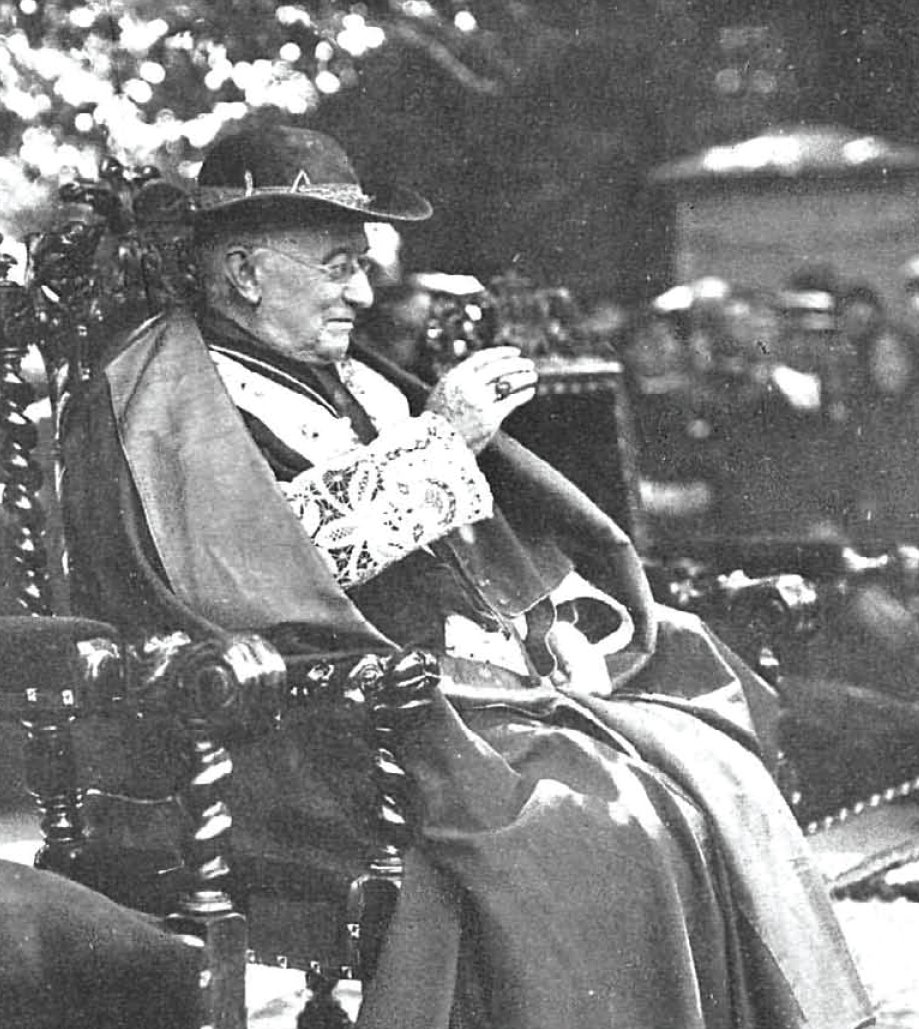
Cardinal Aguirre.

He was ordained in the Franciscan Order and served as a faculty member and rector of several theological colleges of his order in Spain and the Philippines. He was lecturer of philosophy from 1860 until 1863; and theology from 1863 to 1879. He was rector of the schools of Consuegra, 1867–1870; Pastrana, 1870–1876; Almagro, 1878; and Puebla de Montalbán, 1881.

=== Episcopate ===
He was appointed bishop of Lugo on 27 March 1885 by Pope Leo XIII. He served as Senator of the Spanish kingdom from 1893 until 1895, and again from 1902 until his death. He was promoted to the metropolitan see of Burgos on 18 May 1894. From 1909 until his death, he was Archbishop of Toledo.

=== Cardinalate ===
He was created cardinal priest of San Giovanni a Porta Latina in the consistory of 15 April 1907 by Pope Pius X. He was transferred to the primatial see of Toledo on 29 April 1909. He died on 10 October 1913.

Catholic Church titles
Preceded by Ciriaco María Sancha y Hervás	Archbishop of Toledo; 29 April 1909 – 10 October 1913	Succeeded by Victoriano Guisasola y Menéndez
