= Enrique Almaraz y Santos =

Spanish archbishop (1847–1922)

His Eminence Enrique Almaraz y Santos
- Archbishop of Toledo
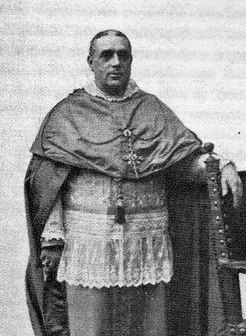
- Church: Roman Catholic Church
- Archdiocese: Toledo
- See: Toledo
- Appointed: 16 December 1920
- Term ended: 22 January 1922
- Predecessor: Victoriano Guisasola y Menéndez
- Successor: Enrique Reig y Casanova
- Other post: Cardinal-Priest of San Pietro in Montorio (1912–22)
- Previous posts: Bishop of Palencia (1893–1907); Archbishop of Seville (1907–20)

Orders
- Ordination: 1874 by Narciso Martínez Izquierdo
- Consecration: 16 April 1893 by Ciriaco María Sancha y Hervás
- Created cardinal: 27 November 1911 by Pope Pius X
- Rank: Cardinal-Priest

Personal details
- Born: Enrique Almaraz y Santos; 22 September 1847 La Vellés, Salamanca, Spanish Kingdom
- Died: 22 January 1922 (aged 74) Madrid, Kingdom of Spain
- Buried: Toledo Cathedral
- Motto: Bonus pastor animam dat pro ovibus suis
- Coat of arms: Enrique Almaraz y Santos's coat of arms

Styles of Enrique Almaraz y Santos
- Reference style: His Eminence
- Spoken style: Your Eminence
- Informal style: Cardinal
- See: Seville

Enrique Almaraz y Santos S.T.D. (22 September 1847 – 22 January 1922) was a Cardinal of the Roman Catholic Church and Archbishop of Seville and, later, Archbishop of Toledo and so Primate of Spain.

== Early life and priesthood ==
Enrique Almaraz was born in La Vellés, Salamanca Province. His father was a teacher and Enrique was educated at the Central Seminary of Salamanca where he was awarded a doctorate in theology.

He was ordained in the diocese of Salamanca and remained there doing pastoral work. He served as a faculty member of the Seminary of Salamanca and was canon schoolmaster at the cathedral of Salamanca in 1874. During this time he was created Privy chamberlain. He was transferred to Madrid where he was a preacher of the Royal Chamber at the Court of the King. He served as secretary to the bishop of Madrid and was a faculty member of the Seminary of Madrid. He was elected Vicar capitular of Madrid in April 1886.

== Episcopate ==
Pope Leo XIII appointed him bishop of Palencia on 18 January 1893 and he was consecrated on 16 April. He was a Senator of the Spanish Kingdom from 1899 to 1902. He was promoted to the metropolitan see of Seville on 18 April 1907. He was reappointed Senator of the Spanish Kingdom in November 1907, serving until his death.

== Cardinalate ==
He was created Cardinal-Priest of San Pietro in Montorio by Pope Pius X in the consistory of 27 November 1911. He participated in the conclave of 1914 that elected Pope Benedict XV. He was transferred to the primatial see of Toledo on 16 December 1920.

He died on 22 January 1922 in Madrid, and was buried in the metropolitan cathedral of Toledo.

Catholic Church titles
Preceded by Salvador Castellote y Pinazo	Archbishop of Seville; 18 April 1907 – 16 December 1920	Succeeded by Eustaquio Ilundáin y Esteban
Preceded by Victoriano Guisasola y Menéndez	Archbishop of Toledo; 16 December 1920 – 22 January 1922	Succeeded by Enrique Reig y Casanova
