= Sebastián Herrero y Espinosa de los Monteros =

Spanish prelate

His Eminence Sebastián Herrero y Espinosa de los Monteros C.O.
- Archbishop of Valencia
- Church: Roman Catholic Church
- Archdiocese: Valencia
- See: Valencia
- Appointed: 24 March 1898
- Term ended: 9 December 1903
- Predecessor: Ciriaco María Sancha y Hervás
- Successor: Bernardino Nozaleda y Villa
- Other post: Cardinal-Priest of Santi Bonifacio ed Alessio (1903)
- Previous posts: Bishop of Cuenca (1875-76); Bishop of Vitoria (1876-80); Bishop of Oviedo (1882-83); Bishop of Córdoba (1883-98)

Orders
- Ordination: 1860
- Consecration: 30 November 1875 by Félix María Arrieta y Llano
- Created cardinal: 22 June 1903 by Pope Leo XIII
- Rank: Cardinal-Priest

Personal details
- Born: Sebastián Herrero y Espinosa de los Monteros; 20 January 1822 Jerez de la Frontera, Kingdom of Spain
- Died: 9 December 1903 (aged 81) Valencia, Spanish Kingdom
- Buried: Valencia Cathedral
- Parents: Diego José Herrero y Morís; Francisca Javiera Espinosa de los Monteros y Aliaga

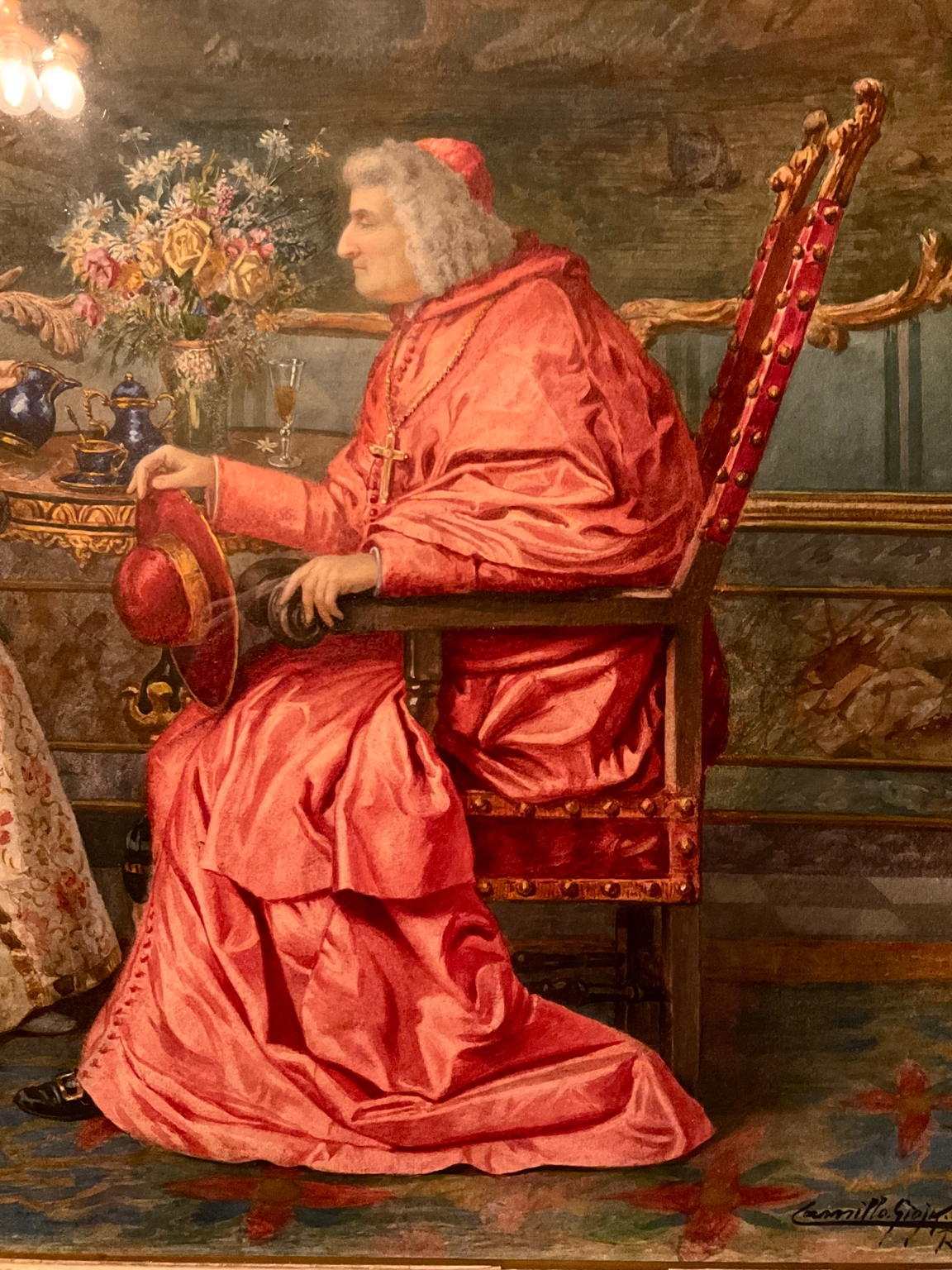
A Visit from his Eminence Cardinal Herrera Espinoza to the Duchess Watercolor by Camillo Gioja Barbera, Italian (1829-1906). Glensheen, University of Minnesota

Sebastián Herrero y Espinosa de los Monteros C.O. (20 January 1822 – 9 December 1903) was a Spanish prelate of the Catholic Church who beginning in 1875 served briefly as the Bishop of Cuenca, Vitoria, and Oviedo, and then 15 years as Bishop of Cordoba. In his last appointment he was Archbishop of Valencia from 1898 until his death in 1903. He became a cardinal less than six months before his death.

== Biography ==
Sebastián Herrero y Espinosa de los Monteros was born on 20 January 1822 in Jerez de la Frontera, Spain. He obtained a degree in civil and canon law at the University of Seville. He was a poet and playwright, and he contributed to several newspapers. In 1856 he became a member of the Oratory of Saint Philip Neri. He was ordained a priest in 1860 and became rector of the seminary in Cadiz. He was vicar general of the Diocese of Cadiz from 1866 to 1868 and canon archpriest of the cathedral.

On 17 September 1875, Pope Pius IX appointed him Bishop of Cuenca. He was consecrated bishop on 30 November by José Félix Arriete Llano, Bishop of Cadiz. On 18 December 1876 he was transferred to the Diocese of Vitoria. In 1880, because of health problems, he gave up his bishopric and retired to Sanlúcar de Barrameda.

On 27 March 1882, Pope Leo XIII named him Bishop of Oviedo and then transferred him to Cordoba on 15 March 1883.

On 24 March 1898, Pope Leo promoted him to Archbishop of Valencia.

Pope Leo XIII made him a cardinal-priest in the consistory of 22 June 1903 and died before Herrero could be invested with the symbols of that office. Herrero, very ill himself, nevertheless participated in the conclave of 1903 that elected Pope Pius X and received his red hat from Pius X, who assigned him the titular church of Santi Bonifacio ed Alessio on 7 August 1903.

He died in Valencia on 9 December 1903.
