= Enrique Reig y Casanova =

Spanish Catholic cardinal (1858–1927)

His Eminence Enrique Reig y Casanova
- Archbishop of Toledo; Primate of Spain
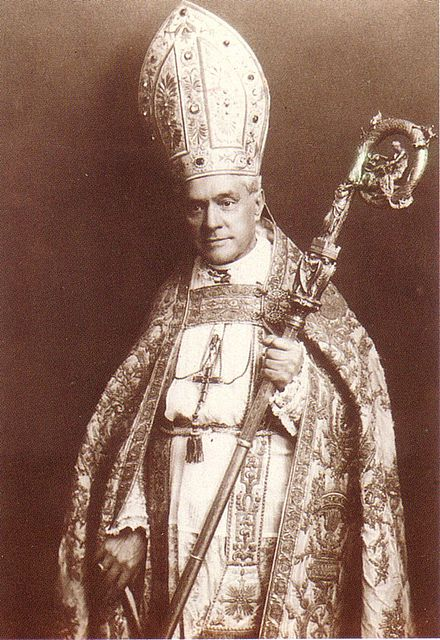
- c. 1920.
- Church: Roman Catholic Church
- Archdiocese: Toledo
- See: Toledo
- Appointed: 14 December 1922
- Term ended: 25 August 1927
- Predecessor: Enrique Almaraz y Santos
- Successor: Pedro Segura y Sáenz
- Other post(s): Cardinal-Priest of San Pietro in Montorio (1923–27)
- Previous post(s): Bishop of Barcelona (1914–20); Archbishop of Valencia (1920–22)

Orders
- Ordination: 1886 by José María Orberá
- Consecration: 8 November 1914 by Francesco Ragonesi
- Created cardinal: 11 December 1922 by Pope Pius XI
- Rank: Cardinal-Priest

Personal details
- Born: Enrique Reig y Casanova; 20 January 1858; Valencia, Spain
- Died: 25 August 1927 (aged 69); Toledo, Spain
- Buried: Toledo Cathedral
- Parents: Francisco Reig; Ramona Casanova
- Motto: Plura concilium quam ut

Styles of Enrique Reig y Casanova
- Reference style: His Eminence
- Spoken style: Your Eminence
- Informal style: Cardinal
- See: Toledo

Enrique Reig y Casanova (20 January 1858 – 25 August 1927) was a Cardinal of the Catholic Church and an archbishop of Toledo and Primate of Spain.

== Biography ==
Enrique Reig was born in Valencia, Spain, and was educated at the diocesan seminary of Valencia. He left his studies to get married. He worked as a lawyer in Valencia. When his wife died in 1885 he returned to the seminary.

He was ordained in 1886 in Valencia. He worked in the Diocese of Almeria from 1886 until 1901 doing pastoral work and as a faculty member of its seminary as well as serving as its chancellor and vicar general. In 1901 he was transferred to the Archdiocese of Toledo where he served until 1914 as an archdeacon and canon of the cathedral chapter and its vicar general. He was created Protonotary apostolic on 22 March 1903. He was an Auditor of Sacred Rota of Madrid in 1904 and was Rector of the University of Madrid.

He was appointed Bishop of Barcelona on 28 March 1914, when Barcelona was not yet an archdiocese. He was named Archbishop of Valencia on 22 April 1920. He was transferred to the see of Toledo on 14 December 1922 at the same time he was named a cardinal. As Archbishop of Toledo, he also held the title Primate of Spain.

Pope Pius XI made him Cardinal-Priest of San Pietro in Montorio at the consistory of 11 December 1922. To do so, Pius ignored the rule established in 1585 by Pope Sixtus V that no one who had been married could be made a cardinal.

He died on 25 August 1927 and was buried at the metropolitan cathedral of Toledo.

== Publications ==
- Elementos de Religion y Moral por ... (1893)
- Sobre el Catocicismo y la Restauracion Catolica en Espana (1904)

Catholic Church titles
Preceded by Juan José Laguarda y Fenollera	Bishop of Barcelona; 1914–1920	Succeeded by Ramón Guillamet y Coma
Preceded by José María Salvador y Barrera	Archbishop of Valencia; 1920–1922	Succeeded by Prudencio Melo y Alcalde
Preceded by Enrique Almaraz y Santos	Archbishop of Toledo; 1922–1927	Succeeded by Pedro Segura y Sáenz
