= Antiochia in Pisidia (titular see) =

Antiochia in Pisidia is an archepiscopal titular see of the Roman Catholic Church. Since 1933 it has been named after the ancient city of Antiochia in Pisidia, visited by Saint Paul on his missionary journeys (Acts 13:14).

Titular Archbishops of Antiochia in Pisidia
No.	Name	Office	From	To
1	Carlo Belgrado	Bishop emeritus of the Diocese of Ascoli Piceno (Italy)	1860	
2	Leopoldo Franchi	Bishop emeritus of the Diocese of Livorno (Italy)	11 February 1898	1902
3	Charles-François Turinaz	Bishop of Nancy (France)	1 August 1913	19 October 1918
4	Biovanni Volpi	bishop emeritus of the Diocese of Arezzo (Italy)	3 July 1919	19 June 1931
5	Gustavo Matteoni	Coadjutor bishop to the Archdiocese of Siena (Italy)	3 March 1932	29 September 1932
6	Filippo Bernadini	Curia bishop	13 March 1933	26 August 1954
7	José María Bueno y Monreal	Coadjutor bishop of the Archdiocese of Seville (Spain)	27 October 1954	8 April 1957
8	Fermín Emilio Lafitte	Coadjutor bishop of the Archdiocese of Buenos Aires (Argentina)	20 January 1958	25 March 1959
9	Francisco de Assis Pires	Bishop emeritus of the Diocese of Crato (Brazil)	11 July 1959	10 February 1960
10	Corrado Bafile	Curia bishop	13 February 1960	24 May 1976

== Notes ==
The appointment of Angelo Giacinto Scapardini to this title on 10 September 1910, apparently in error, was promptly changed on 23 September.
