= Francisco Peralta y Ballabriga =

Spanish Roman Catholic bishop

- Bishop of Vitoria Diocese (Emeritus)
- Church: Roman Catholic Church
- See: Vitoria Diocese
- In office: 1955–1978
- Predecessor: José María Bueno y Monreal
- Successor: José María Larrauri Lafuente
- Previous post: Bishop

Orders
- Ordination: 28 March 1936
- Consecration: 20 March 1955 by Ildebrando Antoniutti

Personal details
- Born: 15 August 1911 Híjar
- Died: 23 August 2006 (aged 95)

Francisco Peralta y Ballabriga (15 August 1911 – 23 August 2006) was a Spanish Roman Catholic bishop. At the time of his death, aged 95, he was one of the oldest bishops in the Church and one of the oldest bishops in Spain.

== Biography ==
Lafuente was born in Híjar in 1911 and was ordained a priest on 28 March 1936. He had his first pastoral chargement as parson of Jatiel, Castelnou and La Puebla de Híjar. He was also professor at the seminar and at the University of Zaragoza.

Appointed Bishop of Vitoria on 9 January 1955, he was consecrated on the following 20 March by Archbishop Ildebrando Antoniutti, apostolic nuncio in Spain.

He participated in all four sessions of the Second Vatican Council and promoted in his diocese the liturgical reforms by the council.

He resigned on 10 July 1978 and died on 23 August 2006, eight days after his was ninety-fifth birthday.

== Bibliography ==
- Mariano Laborda, Recuerdos de Híjar, Centro de Iniciativas Turísticas del Cuadro Artístito de Híjar, 1980.
- Mariano Laborda, Recuerdos de Híjar 2, Centro de Iniciativas Turísticas del Cuadro Artístito de Híjar, 1993.

Catholic Church titles
Preceded by José María Bueno y Monreal	Bishop of Vitoria; 10 January 1955 – 10 July 1978	Succeeded by José María Larrauri Lafuente
