= Antonio María Cascajares y Azara =

Spanish Roman Catholic cardinal

His Eminence Antonio María Cascajares y Azara
- Archbishop of Zaragoza
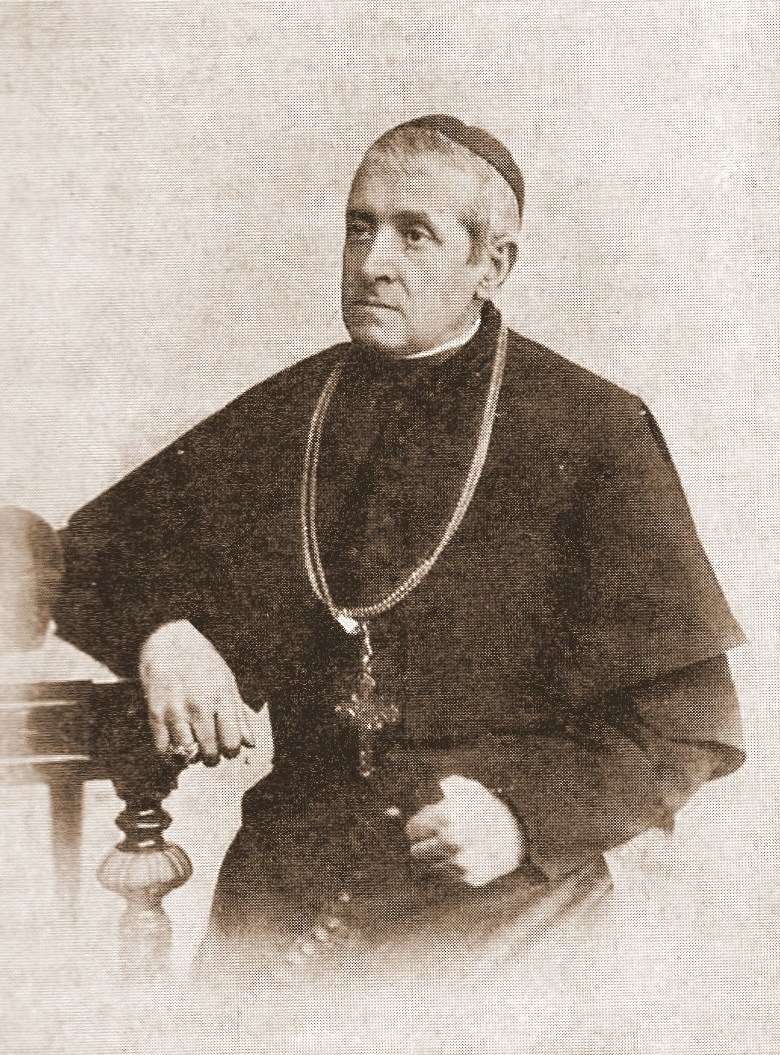
- Church: Roman Catholic Church
- Archdiocese: Zaragoza
- See: Zaragoza
- Appointed: 18 April 1901
- Term ended: 27 July 1901
- Predecessor: Vicente Alda y Sancho
- Successor: Juan Soldevila y Romero
- Other post: Cardinal-Priest of Sant'Agostino (1898-1901)
- Previous posts: Titular Bishop of Dora (1882-84); Prior nullius of Ciudad Real (1882-84); Bishop of Calahorra y La Calzada (1884-91); Archbishop of Valladolid (1891-1901); Cardinal-Priest of Sant'Eusebio (1896-98)

Orders
- Ordination: 23 February 1861 by Manuel García Gil
- Consecration: 4 June 1882 by Angelo Bianchi
- Created cardinal: 29 November 1895 by Pope Leo XIII
- Rank: Cardinal-Priest

Personal details
- Born: Antonio María Cascajares y Azara; 2 March 1834 Calanda, Kingdom of Spain
- Died: 27 July 1901 (aged 67) Calahorra, Spanish Kingdom
- Parents: Agustón Cascajares y Bardaxí; Catalina de Azara y Mata
- Motto: Sit nomen Domini benedictum ("Blessed be the name of the Lord")
- Coat of arms

Antonio María Cascajares y Azara (2 March 1834 – 27 July 1901) was a Spanish Roman Catholic cardinal, archbishop of Valladolid and archbishop-elect of Zaragoza.

== Biography ==
He was born in Calanda, Teruel Province, Aragon. He joined the military in 1846 and retired with the rank of captain in 1857, to follow his ecclesiastical studies leading to a licentiate in theology and canon law. He was ordained priest in 1861. He served in Zaragoza, Toledo and Burgos. He was elected titular bishop of Dora and named prelate of Ciudad Real on 27 March 1882. He transferred to the see of Calahorra y La Calzada on 27 March 1884 and was promoted to the metropolitan see of Valladolid on 17 December 1891.

Pope Leo XIII created him cardinal priest in the consistory on 29 November 1895, with the title of Sant'Eusebio. He opted for the title of Sant'Agostino on 24 March 1898. He was elected archbishop of Zaragoza on 18 April 1901 but he died (before taking possession of the see) on 27 July 1901 in Calahorra. He was buried in Calanda - his birthplace.

== Footnotes ==
Catholic Church titles
Preceded by Victoriano Guisasola y Rodríguez	Prelate of Ciudad Real; 27 March 1882 – 27 March 1884	Succeeded by José María Rancés y Villanueva
Preceded by Gabino Catalina del Amo	Bishop of Calahorra y La Calzada; 27 March 1884 – 17 December 1891	Succeeded by Vacant until 1927
Preceded by Mariano Miguel Gómez Alguacil y Fernández	Archbishop of Valladolid; 17 December 1891 – 18 April 1901	Succeeded by José María Cos y Macho
Preceded by Vicente Alda y Sancho	Archbishop (-elect) of Zaragoza; 18 April 1901 – 27 July 1901	Succeeded by Juan Soldevila y Romero
Preceded by Antolín Monescillo y Viso	Cardinal Priest of Sant'Agostino; 1898–1901	Succeeded by Sebastiano Martinelli
