= Carazo, Province of Burgos =

Coordinates: 41°58′N 3°21′W

Carazo
- Municipality and town
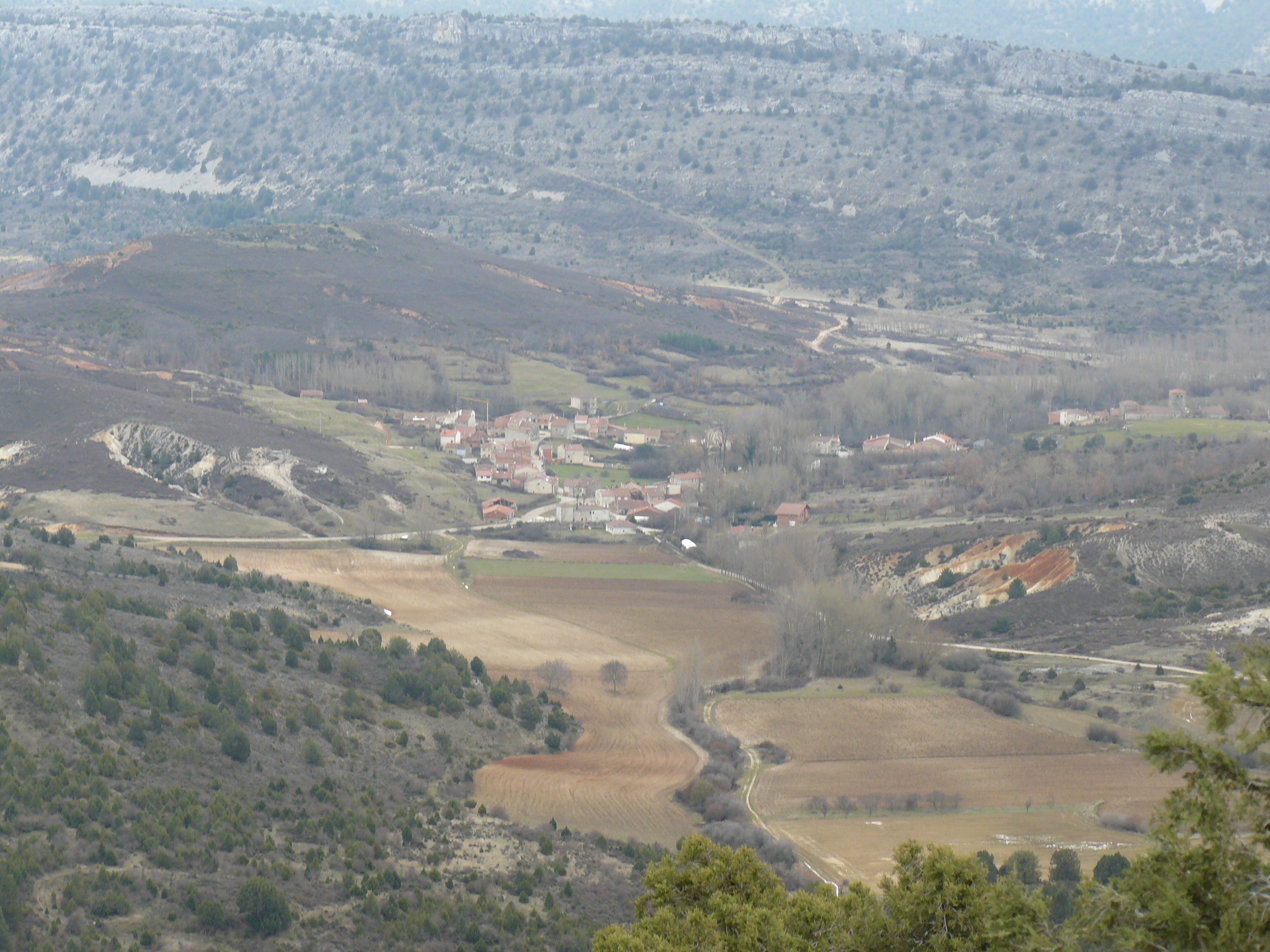
- View of Carazo, 2013
- Interactive map of Carazo
- Country: Spain
- Autonomous community: Castile and León
- Province: Burgos
- Comarca: Sierra de la Demanda

Area
  - Total: 26 km^{2} (10 sq mi)
- Elevation: 1,135 m (3,724 ft)

Population (2025-01-01)
  - Total: 42
  - Density: 1.6/km^{2} (4.2/sq mi)
- Time zone: UTC+1 (CET)
  - Summer (DST): UTC+2 (CEST)
- Postal code: 09611
- Website: http://www.carazo.es/

Carazo is a municipality located in the province of Burgos, Castile and León, Spain.

== People from Carazo ==
- Pedro Segura y Sáenz (4 December 1880—8 April 1957) - Cardinal of the Roman Catholic Church.
