= José María Larrauri Lafuente =

Spanish Bishop

- Bishop of Vitoria Diocese (Emeritus)
- Church: Roman Catholic Church
- See: Vitoria Diocese
- In office: 1979–1995
- Predecessor: Francisco Peralta y Ballabriga
- Successor: Miguel José Asurmendi Aramendia
- Previous post(s): Bishop

Orders
- Ordination: 29 June 1949

Personal details
- Born: 4 March 1918; Vitoria, Spain
- Died: 9 December 2008 (aged 90)

José María Larrauri Lafuente (4 March 1918 – 9 December 2008) was a Spanish Bishop of the Roman Catholic Church. At the time of his death, aged 90, he was one of the oldest bishops in the Church and one of oldest bishops of Spain.

Lafuente was born in Vitoria, Spain and was ordained a priest on 29 June 1948 in Vitoria, Spain. He was appointed Auxiliary bishop of Archdiocese of Pamplona on 21 September 1970, along with the Titular Bishop of Aufinium, and was ordained a bishop on 4 November 1970. On 16 February 1979 Legarreta was appointed to the Vitoria Diocese and would remain there until his retirement on 8 September 1995.

Catholic Church titles
Preceded by -	Auxiliary bishop of Pamplona; Titular Bishop of Aufinium; 1970–1979	Succeeded by Carlos Talavera Ramírez

Catholic Church titles
Preceded by Francisco Peralta y Ballabriga	Bishop of Vitoria; 16 February 1979 – 8 September 1995	Succeeded by Miguel José Asurmendi Aramendia S.D.B.
