= Diocese of Vitoria =

Roman Catholic diocese in Spain

Coordinates: 42.8508°N 2.6725°W

Diocese of Vitoria Dioecesis Victoriensis Diócesis de Vitoria (es) Gasteizko elizbarrutia (eu)

Catholic
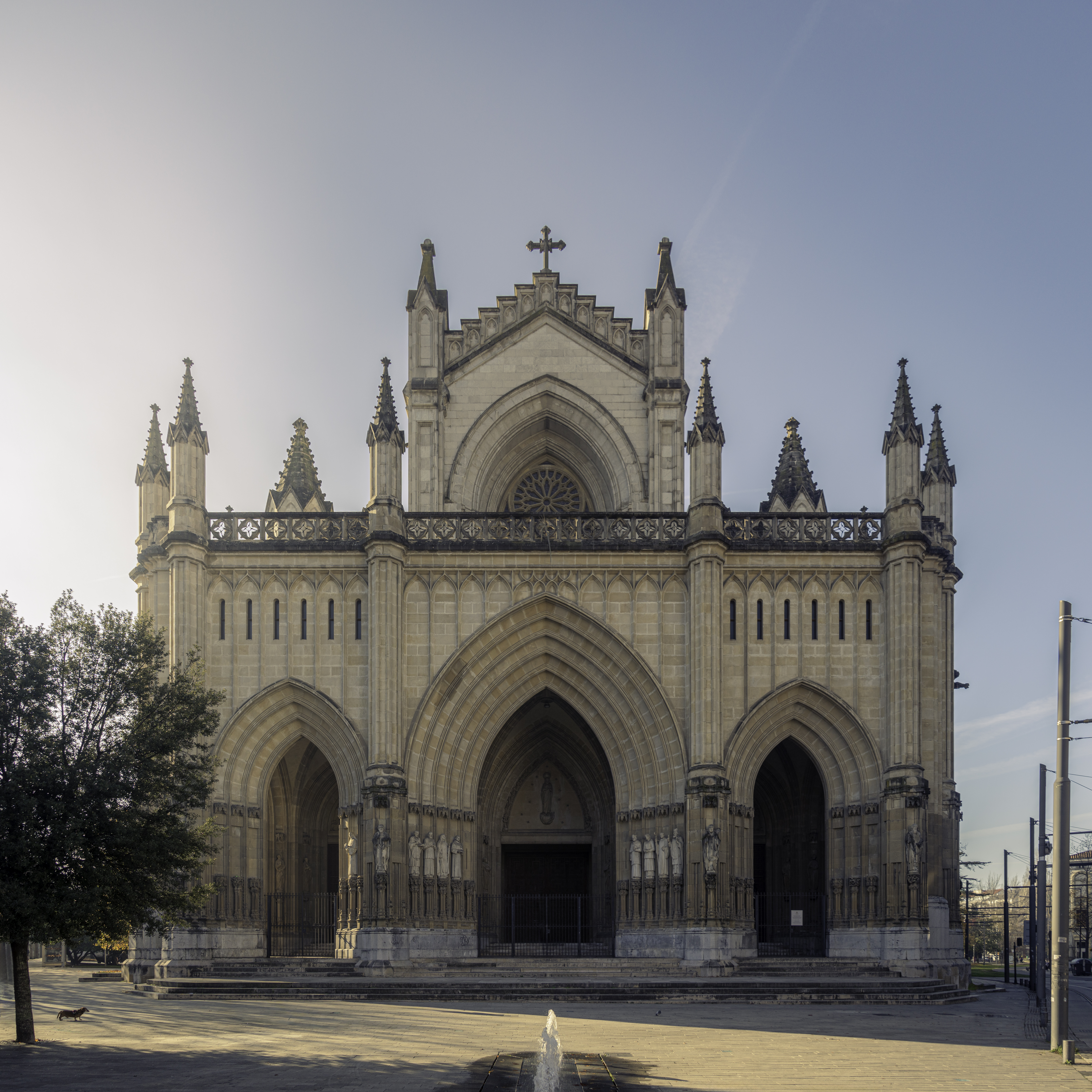

Location
- Country: Spain
- Ecclesiastical province: Burgos
- Metropolitan: Burgos

Statistics
- Area: 3,282 km^{2} (1,267 sq mi)
- Population: Total; Catholics: (as of 2014); 329,900; 298,000 (90.3%)

Information
- Rite: Latin Rite
- Established: 8 September 1861
- Cathedral: Cathedral of the Immaculate Conception in Vitoria-Gasteiz

Current leadership
- Pope: Leo XIV
- Bishop: Juan Carlos Elizalde Espinal
- Metropolitan Archbishop: Francisco Gil Hellín

Map

Website
- Website of the Diocese

The Diocese of Vitoria (Latin: Dioecesis Victoriensis) is a Latin Church diocese of the Catholic Church located in the city of Vitoria-Gasteiz in the ecclesiastical province of Burgos in Spain.

== History ==
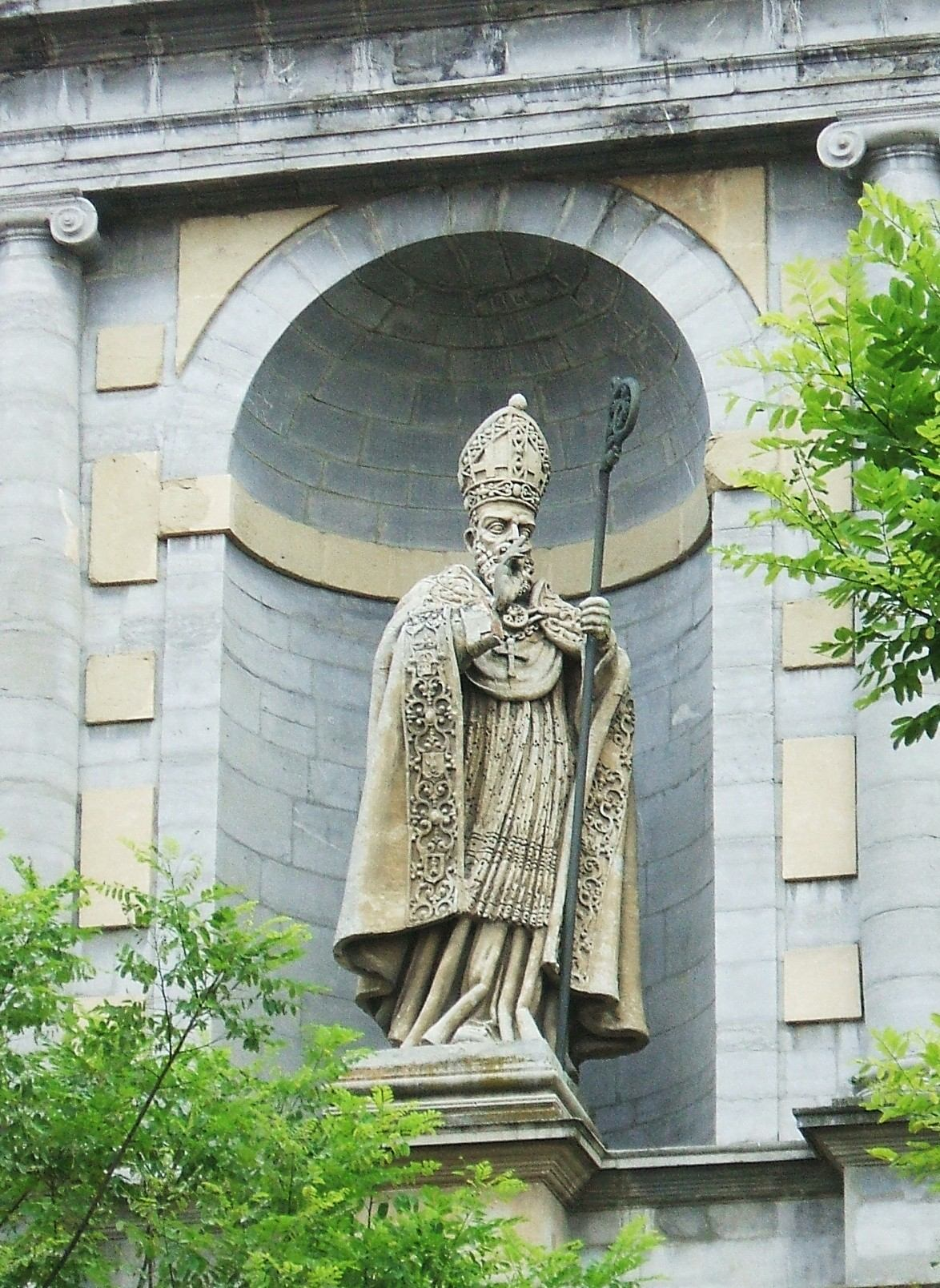
Figure of St. Prudentius, patron saint of Vitoria-Gasteiz

- September 8, 1861: Established as Diocese of Vitoria from the Metropolitan Archdiocese of Burgos, Diocese of Calahorra y La Calzada and Diocese of Pamplona–Tudela

== Special churches ==
- Former Cathedral:
  - Catedral vieja de Santa María, Vitoria, Álava, País Vasco
- Minor Basilica:
  - BVM, Vitoria, Álava, País Vasco

== Leadership ==
- Bishops of Vitoria (Roman rite)
  - Bishop Juan Carlos Elizalde Espinal, (2016.01.08 – Present)
  - Bishop Miguel José Asurmendi Aramendía, S.D.B. (1995.09.08 - 2016.01.08)
  - Bishop José María Larrauri Lafuente (1979.02.16 – 1995.09.08)
  - Bishop Francisco Peralta y Ballabriga (1955.01.10 – 1978.07.10)
  - Cardinal José María Bueno y Monreal (1950.05.13 – 1954.10.27)
  - Archbishop Carmelo Ballester y Nieto, C.M. (1943.06.10 – 1948.10.09)
  - Bishop Mateo Múgica y Urrestarazu (1928.03.10 – 1937.10.12)
  - Archbishop Zacarías Martínez Núñez, O.S.A. (1922.12.14 – 1927.12.02)
  - Patriarch Leopoldo Eijo y Garay (1917.03.22 – 1922.12.14)
  - Archbishop Prudencio Melo y Alcalde (1913.07.18 – 1916.12.04)
  - Archbishop José Cadena y Eleta (1904.11.14 – 1913.07.18)
  - Bishop Ramón Fernández Piérola y Lopez de Luzuriaca (1889.12.30 – 1904.01.25)
  - Archbishop Mariano Miguel Gómez Alguacil y Fernández (1880.12.16 – 1889.12.30)
  - Cardinal Sebastián Herrero y Espinosa de los Monteros, C.O. (1876.12.18 – 1880.06)
  - Bishop Diego Mariano Alguacil Rodríguez (1861.12.23 – 1876.12.18)

== See also ==
- Roman Catholicism in Spain

== Sources ==
- GCatholic.org
- Catholic Hierarchy
- Diocese website
