= Antolín Monescillo y Viso =

Spanish prelate

His Eminence Antolín Monescillo y Viso
- Archbishop of Toledo; Patriarch of Indias Occidentales; Primate of Spain
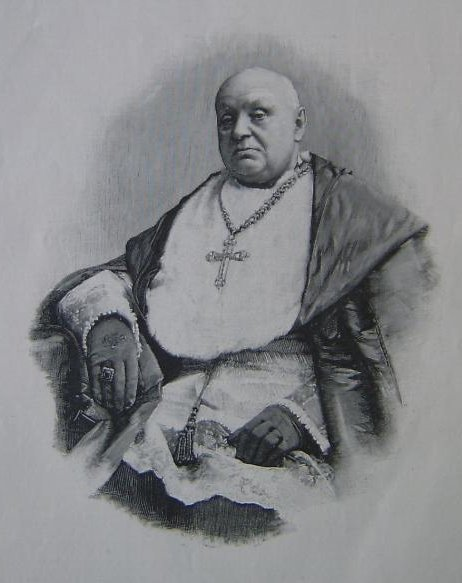
- Church: Roman Catholic Church
- Archdiocese: Toledo
- See: Toledo
- Appointed: 11 July 1892
- Installed: 12 August 1892
- Term ended: 11 August 1897
- Predecessor: Miguel Payá y Rico
- Successor: Ciriaco María Sancha y Hervás
- Other post: Cardinal-Priest of Sant'Agostino (1886-97)
- Previous posts: Bishop of Calahorra y La Calzada (1861-65); Bishop of Jaén (1865-77); Archbishop of Valencia (1877-92)

Orders
- Ordination: 1836
- Consecration: 6 October 1861 by Cirilo de Alameda y Brea
- Created cardinal: 10 November 1884 by Pope Leo XIII
- Rank: Cardinal-Priest

Personal details
- Born: Antolín Monescillo y Viso; 2 September 1811 Corral de Calatrava, Ciudad Real, Kingdom of Spain
- Died: 11 August 1897 (aged 85) Toledo, Spanish Kingdom
- Buried: Toledo Cathedral
- Parents: Nicasio Monescillo; María Viso
- Motto: Monstra te esse Matrem
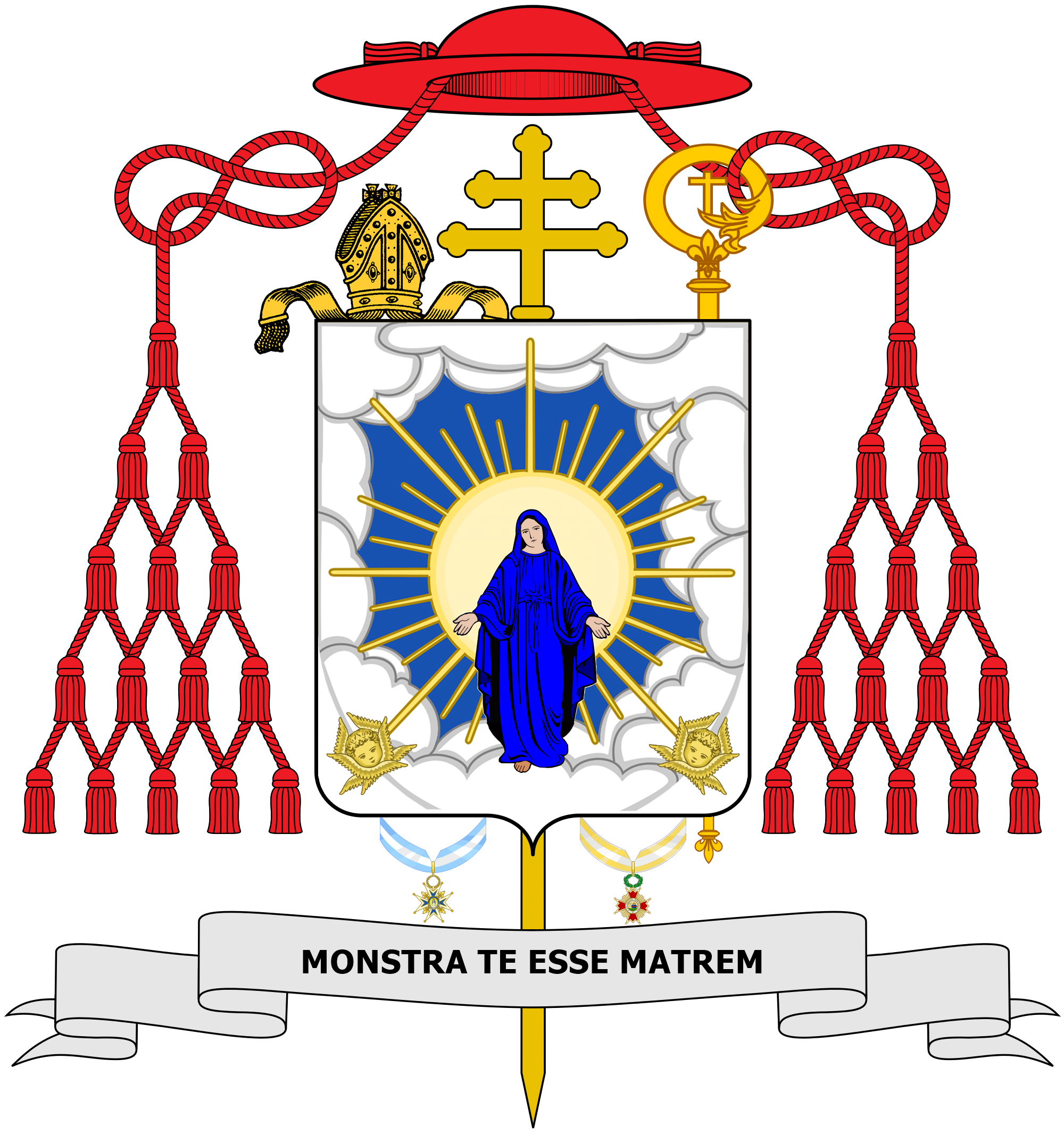
- Coat of arms

Antolín Monescillo y Viso (2 September 1811 – 11 August 1897) was a Spanish prelate of the Catholic Church who became a bishop in 1861 and, after transfers to positions of increasing importance, was made a cardinal in 1884 and served as Archbishop of Toledo and Primate of Spain from 1892 until his death.

== Biography ==
Antolín Monescillo y Viso was born on 2 September 1811 in Corral de Calatrava, Ciudad Real, Spain. His family were farmers; his given name Antolín is the Basque form of Anthony. He studied at the Seminary of Toledo, and earned a doctorate in theology.

He was ordained a priest and worked as a journalist, contributing to El Católico and El Pensamiento Español. In 1842 he founded the daily La Cruz.

Pope Pius IX named him bishop of Calahorra y La Calzada on 22 July 1861. He received his episcopal consecration on 6 October 1861 from Cardinal Cirilo de Alameda y Brea, archbishop of Toledo. He was transferred to see of Jaén on 27 March 1865. He attended the First Vatican Council in 1869-1870.

Promoted to the see of Valencia on 22 June 1877.

Pope Leo XIII made him a cardinal priest on 10 November 1884; he received his red biretta and the title of Sant'Agostino on 10 June 1886.

He was transferred to the see of Toledo and given the title Patriarch of the West Indies on 11 July 1892, the archbishopric that carries the title Primate of Spain.

He died on 11 August 1897 in Toledo.
