= Ciriaco María Sancha y Hervás =

Spanish cardinal of the Roman Catholic Church

Blessed Ciriaco María Sancha y Hervás
- Archbishop of Toledo
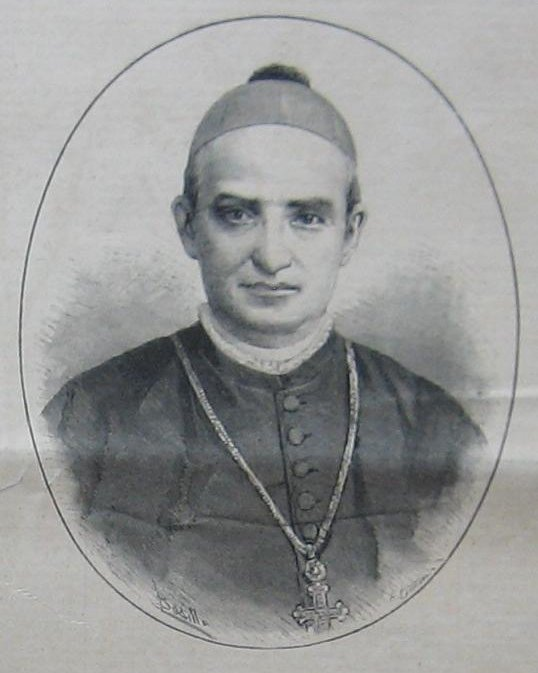
- c. 1889.
- Church: Roman Catholic Church
- Archdiocese: Toledo
- Metropolis: Toledo
- See: Toledo
- Appointed: 24 March 1898
- Installed: 1898
- Term ended: 25 February 1909
- Predecessor: Antolín Monescillo y Viso
- Successor: Gregorio Maria Aguirre y Garcia
- Other posts: Patriarch of the West Indies (1898–1909); Primate of Spain (1898–1909); Cardinal-Priest of San Pietro in Montorio (1895–1909)
- Previous posts: Auxiliary Bishop of Toledo (1876–1882); Titular Bishop of Areopolis (1876–1882); Bishop of Avila (1882–1886); Bishop of Madrid (1886–1892); Archbishop of Valencia (1892–1898)

Orders
- Ordination: 27 June 1858 by Vicente Horcos San Martín
- Consecration: 12 March 1876 by Juan Ignacio Moreno y Maisanove
- Created cardinal: 18 May 1894 by Pope Leo XIII
- Rank: Cardinal-Priest

Personal details
- Born: Ciriaco María Sancha y Hervás; 17 June 1833 Quintana del Pidio, Burgos, Kingdom of Spain
- Died: 25 February 1909 (aged 75) Toledo, Kingdom of Spain
- Denomination: Roman Catholic
- Parents: Ambrosio Sancha & Baltasara Hervás
- Coat of arms

Sainthood
- Feast day: 25 February
- Venerated in: Roman Catholic Church
- Title as Saint: Blessed
- Beatified: 18 October 2009; Toledo, Spain by Archbishop Angelo Amato

Styles of Ciriaco María Sancha y Hervás
- Reference style: His Eminence
- Spoken style: Your Eminence
- Informal style: Cardinal
- See: Toledo

Ciriaco María Sancha y Hervás (17 June 1833 – 25 February 1909) was a Spanish cardinal of the Catholic Church who served as the Archbishop of Toledo in addition to being the Primate of Spain and the Patriarch of the West Indies. He established what is now known as Sisters of Charity of Cardinal Sancha in 1869.

He was beatified on 18 October 2009 during the pontificate of Pope Benedict XVI; Archbishop Angelo Amato celebrated the rite of beatification on behalf of the pontiff. The second miracle required for his canonization is now under investigation.

== Life ==
Ciriaco María Sancha y Hervás was born to Ambrosio Sancha and Baltasara Hervás in Quintana del Pidio in Spain. He was educated at the University of Salamanca where he earned a licentiate in theology.

He was ordained to the priesthood on 27 June 1858. He served as the Lector of philosophical studies in the seminary of Osma. He then served in the archdiocese of Santiago de Cuba from 1862 until 1876 as chancellor-secretary and professor of moral theology in its seminary. He founded the Sisters of Charity on 5 August 1869.

While the archdiocese was vacant because of the death of the archbishop in 1868, the Spanish Republican government named, without the consent of the Holy See, Father Pedro Llorente Miguel as his successor in 1873. Monsignor José María Orberá Carrión, who was vicar capitular, and Sancha opposed the nomination and were jailed for their opposition. The schism ended in 1874 and both were then released.

=== Episcopate ===
He was appointed titular bishop of Areopolis and auxiliary bishop of Toledo by Pope Pius IX on 28 January 1876. He was transferred to the see of Ávila on 27 March 1882 and again to the see of Madrid on 10 June 1886. He was promoted to the metropolitan see of Valencia on 11 July 1892.

=== Cardinalate ===
He was created Cardinal-Priest of San Pietro in Montorio by Pope Leo XIII in the consistory of 18 May 1894. He was again transferred to the primatial and metropolitan see of Toledo on 24 March 1898 and on the same day was awarded the largely honorific title of Patriarch of the West Indies (which made him the titular head of all Spanish military bishops and chaplains). He participated in the conclave of 1903 that elected Pope Pius X.

=== Death ===
Sancha died in the beginning of 1909.

== Sainthood ==
=== Process and Venerable ===
The beatification process for Sancha commenced on 19 June 1982 under Pope John Paul II in which he was accorded with the title of Servant of God. The diocesan process commenced on 22 November 1982 and concluded following the successful accumulation of available evidence. The process was declared completed with the decree of validation from Rome on 3 July 1992.

The postulation sent the Positio dossier to the officials in Rome for further investigation in 1993 while historians declared the cause clear of historical obstacles on 15 March 1994. Around a decade later - on 1 March 2005 - theologians approved the cause while the cardinal and bishop members of the Congregation for the Causes of Saints also approved it on 21 June 2005.

During an audience granted on 28 April 2006 to the Cardinal-Prefect of the C.C.S. - then José Saraiva Martins - Pope Benedict XVI authorized the promulgation of the decree declaring the heroic virtue of the late cardinal. This conferred upon him the title of Venerable.

=== Beatification ===
The miracle needed for beatification was investigated in Santiago de los Caballeros from 10 December 1985 until 18 December 1985 in which all medical documents and interrogatories were compiled and sent to Rome. The decree of validation for that process was issued on 13 December 1996. The medical board based in Rome approved the miracle around a decade later on 18 October 2007 while theologians did likewise on 16 May 2008. The C.C.S. followed suit on 16 December 2008.

On 17 January 2009 - in an audience granted to Archbishop Angelo Amato - Pope Benedict XVI approved the decree that certified a miracle attributed to the intercession of Cardinal Sancha. The beatification celebration took place on 18 October 2009 at the metropolitan cathedral of Toledo with Amato presiding on the behalf of the pontiff.

=== Second miracle ===
The second miracle required for full sanctification was placed under investigation in Santo Domingo from 20 February 2015 until 3 March 2015.

Catholic Church titles
Preceded by Anton Frenzel	Titular Bishop of Areopolis; 28 January 1876 – 27 March 1882	Succeeded by Francesco Giordani
Preceded by Pedro José Sánchez Carrascosa y Carrión	Bishop of Avila; 27 March 1882 – 10 April 1886	Succeeded by Ramón Fernández Piérola y López de Luzuriaca
Preceded by Narciso Martínez Izquierdo	Bishop of Madrid; 10 June 1886 – 11 July 1892	Succeeded by José María Cos y Macho
Preceded by Antolín Monescillo y Viso	Archbishop of Valencia; 11 July 1892 – 24 March 1898	Succeeded by Sebastián Herrero Espinosa de los Monteros
Preceded by Francisco de Paula Benavides y Navarrete	Cardinal-Priest of San Pietro in Montorio; 12 February 1895 – 26 February 1909	Succeeded by Enrique Almaraz y Santos
Preceded by Antolín Monescillo y Viso	Archbishop of Toledo; 24 March 1898 – 26 February 1909	Succeeded by Gregorio María Aguirre y García
Preceded by Antolín Monescillo y Viso	Patriarch of the West Indies; 24 March 1898 – 26 February 1909	Succeeded by Gregorio María Aguirre y García
Preceded by Antolín Monescillo y Viso	Primate of Spain; 24 March 1898 – 26 February 1909	Succeeded by Gregorio María Aguirre y García
