= Eustaquio Ilundáin y Esteban =

His Eminence Eustaquio Ilundáin y Esteban
- Archbishop of Seville
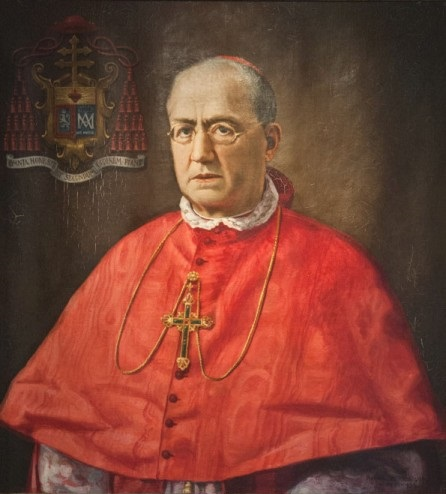
- Church: Roman Catholic Church
- Archdiocese: Seville
- See: Seville
- Appointed: 16 December 1920
- Term ended: 10 August 1937
- Predecessor: Enrique Almaraz y Santos
- Successor: Pedro Segura y Sáenz
- Other post: Cardinal-Priest of San Lorenzo in Panisperna (1925–37)
- Previous post: Bishop of Orense (1904–20)

Orders
- Ordination: 10 April 1886
- Consecration: 13 March 1905 by José Cadena y Eleta
- Created cardinal: 30 March 1925 by Pope Pius XI
- Rank: Cardinal-Priest

Personal details
- Born: Eustaquio Ilundáin y Esteban; 20 September 1862 Pamplona, Spanish Kingdom
- Died: 10 August 1937 (aged 74) Seville, Second Spanish Republic
- Buried: Seville Cathedral
- Parents: Juan Cruz Ilundáin y Unciti; Rafaela Esteban Vélez
- Motto: Omnia honeste et secundum ordinem fiant
- Coat of arms

Styles of Eustaquio Ilundáin y Esteban
- Reference style: His Eminence
- Spoken style: Your Eminence
- Informal style: Cardinal
- See: Seville

Eustaquio Ilundáin y Esteban (20 September 1862 – 10 August 1937) was a Cardinal of the Roman Catholic Church who served as Archbishop of Seville.

== Early life and priesthood ==
Eustaquio Ilundáin y Esteban was born in Pamplona, Spain. He was educated at the Seminary of Pamplona, and the Seminary of Ciudad Real.

He was ordained in 1886 in Pamplona. He served as a faculty member of the Seminary of Pamplona from 1886 until 1891. From 1901 until 1904 he was the Rector of the Seminary of Segovia.

== Episcopate ==
He was appointed as bishop of Ourense by Pope Pius X on 14 November 1904. He served as a Senator of the Spanish Kingdom for the province of Santiago de Compostela. He was promoted to the metropolitan see of Seville on 16 December 1920.

While bishop of Ourense he ordered the dismantling of a baldaquino that had been built over the altar of the monastery church of Santa María la Real de Oseira. He described it as "un armatoste". This ornate baroque wooden canopy, although possibly in a poor state of repair, was much loved by the villagers of Oseira. They were upset and protested but Bishop Ilundáin refused to listen to them or retract his order. He considered that the baldaquino was an ugly monstrosity that spoiled the beauty of the magnificent church and would not be contradicted. The protests continued. Local carpenters refused to comply with the bishop's orders. Determined to be obeyed, in April 1909, a group of carpenters were sent from Ourense accompanied by an armed contingent of some sixteen or more Civil Guards, together with an officer, Lieutenant Salinas.

The end result was the horrific massacre of at least seven villagers from among the crowd who had gathered to voice their objections. These included a fourteen-year-old girl, a pregnant woman and two old men of seventy. An unknown number were injured with bullet wounds, many frightened to identify themselves for fear of possible reprisals. Following the event, Bishop Ilundáin conveniently disappeared for several weeks, ostensibly on an episcopal visit to some remote corner of the province, and could not be contacted. It is known that he had discussed the matter with the Civil Governor prior to the incident. Whether he requested the presence of the Civil Guards or whether the Civil Governor gave the order independently is not known. The fact is that he was complicit and that as a direct result of his heavy-handed and arrogant intransigence, innocent lives were brutally and unnecessarily taken.

== Cardinalate ==
He was created and proclaimed Cardinal-Priest of San Lorenzo in Panisperna by Pope Pius XI in the consistory of 30 March 1925. He died while still in office in 1937.

Catholic Church titles
Preceded by Enrique Almaraz y Santos	Archbishop of Seville; 16 December 1920 – 10 August 1937	Succeeded by Pedro Segura y Sáenz
