= Archdiocese of Valladolid =

Roman Catholic archdiocese in Spain

Coordinates: 41.6526°N 4.7234°W

Metropolitan Archdiocese of Valladolid Archidioecesis Metropolitae Vallisoletanus Archidiócesis Metropolitano de Valladolid

Catholic
- Valladolid Cathedral

- Coat of arms

Location
- Country: Spain
- Ecclesiastical province: Valladolid

Statistics
- Area: 8,172 km^{2} (3,155 sq mi)
- Population: Total; Catholics: (as of 2010); 533,561; 453,527 (85%)

Information
- Denomination: Roman Catholic
- Sui iuris church: Latin Church
- Rite: Roman Rite
- Established: 25 September 1595 (As Diocese of Valladolid); 4 July 1857 (As Archdiocese of Valladolid)
- Cathedral: Cathedral of the Assumption and St Lawrence in Valladolid

Current leadership
- Pope: Leo XIV
- Metropolitan Archbishop: Luis Argüello
- Suffragans: Diocese of Ávila; Diocese of Ciudad Rodrigo; Diocese of Salamanca; Diocese of Segovia; Diocese of Zamora
- Bishops emeritus: Ricardo Blázquez

Map

Website
- Website of the Archdiocese

The Metropolitan Archdiocese of Valladolid (Latin: Archidioecesis Metropolitae Vallisoletanus) is a Latin Church diocese of the Catholic Church in Spain, elevated from the rank of diocese in 1857.

The seat of the archbishop is the Cathedral of Nuestra Señora de la Asunción. Valladolid also houses the National Sanctuary of the Gran Promesa. (Note: "A 17th-century church in Valladolid that had formerly served as the chapel of the Jesuit College of St. Ambrose; the parish Church of St. Stephen, and the Expiatory Temple of the Sacred Heart was rededicated as the National Sanctuary of la Gran Promesa in 1941 to commemorate an especially Spanish devotion to the Sacred Heart propagated by the 18th century Jesuit Bernardo Francisco de Hoyos de Seña)

== History ==
It was erected as the Diocese of Valladolid on 25 December 1595, by the bull Pro excellenti of Pope Clement VIII, from the territory of the Diocese of Palencia. The creation of the diocese put an end to the centuries-old conflict between the Abbot of Valladolid and the Bishop of Palencia.

The Cathedral of Our Lady of the Assumption was consecrated in 1668. Following the Concordat of 1851 between Spain and the Holy See, the diocese was elevated to the rank of Metropolitan Archdiocese by Pope Pius IX on July 4, 1857, with the suffragan sees of Ávila, Ciudad Rodrigo, Salamanca, Segovia, and Zamora. The diocesan seminary was founded in 1855. In 1955 the territory of the diocese was considerably enlarged.

== List of Ordinaries of Valladolid ==
- Bartolomé de la Plaza (18 December 1596 – 10 October 1600 Died)
- Juan Bautista Acevedo Muñoz (30 April 1601 – 28 April 1606 Resigned)
- Juan Vigil de Quiñones y Labiada (13 August 1607 – 18 July 1616 Appointed, Bishop of Segovia)
- Francisco Sobrino Morillas (5 September 1616 – 8 January 1618 Died)
- Juan Fernández Valdivieso (22 October 1618 – May 1619 Died)
- Enrique Pimentel Zúñiga (29 July 1619 – 13 February 1623 Appointed, Bishop of Cuenca)
- Alfonso López Gallo (29 May 1624 – 1 July 1627 Died)
- Juan Torres de Osorio (19 July 1627 – 23 September 1632 Died)
- Gregorio Pedrosa Cásares, O.S.H. (31 January 1633 – 1645 Resigned)
- Juan Merino López, O.F.M. (18 Feb 1647 – 24 Sep 1663 Died)
- Francisco de Seijas Losada (23 June 1664 – 20 June 1670 Appointed, Bishop of Salamanca)
- Jacinto de Boada y Montenegro (22 December 1670 – 13 May 1671 Died)
- Gabriel de la Calle y Heredia (1 July 1671 – 1682 Resigned)
- Diego de La Cueva y Aldana (24 May 1683 – 28 July 1707 Died)
- Andrés Orueta Barasorda (3 October 1708 – 3 March 1716 Died)
- José de Talavera Gómez de Eugenio, O.S.H. (2 September 1716 – 5 November 1727 Died)
- Julián Domínguez y Toledo (10 May 1728 – 2 June 1743 Died)
- Martín Delgado Cenarro y Lapiedra (23 September 1743 – 22 December 1753 Died)
- Isidoro Cossío y Bustamente Diaz Santos (16 September 1754 – 26 February 1768 Resigned)
- Manuel Rubín y Celis (14 March 1768 – 15 March 1773 Appointed, Bishop of Cartagena (en España))
- Antonio Joaquín Soria (13 September 1773 – 29 October 1784 Died)
- Manuel Joaquín Morón (26 September 1785 – 27 February 1801 Died)
- Juan Antonio Hernández Pérez de Larrea (29 Mar 1802 – 21 Apr 1803 Died)
- Vicente José Soto y Valcárce (26 September 1803 – 16 Feb 1818 Died)
- Juan Baltasar Toledano (12 Jul 1824 – 27 May 1830 Died)
- Juan Antonio Rivadeneyra (28 February 1831 – 26 June 1856 Died)
- Luis de la Lastra y Cuesta (3 August 1857 – 16 March 1863 Confirmed, Archbishop of Sevilla)
- Juan Ignacio Moreno y Maisanove (1 October 1863 – 5 July 1875 Confirmed, Archbishop of Toledo)
- Fernando Blanco y Lorenzo, O.P. (17 September 1875 – 6 June 1881 Died)
- Benito Sanz y Forés (18 Nov 1881 – 30 Dec 1889 Appointed, Archbishop of Sevilla)
- Mariano Miguel Gómez Alguacil y Fernández (30 December 1889 – 14 September 1891 Died)
- Antonio María Cascajares y Azara (17 December 1891 – 18 April 1901 Appointed, Archbishop of Zaragoza)
- José María Cos y Macho (18 April 1901 – 17 December 1919 Died)
- Remigio Gandásegui y Gorrochátegui (22 April 1920 – 16 May 1937 Died)
- Antonio García y García (4 February 1938 – 15 May 1953 Died)
- José García y Goldaraz (25 August 1953 – 2 July 1970 Retired)
- Felix Romero Menjibar (2 July 1970 – 21 September 1974 Died)
- José Delicado Baeza (18 April 1975 – 28 August 2002 Retired)
- Braulio Rodríguez Plaza (28 August 2002 – 16 April 2009 Appointed, Archbishop of Toledo)
- Ricardo Blázquez Pérez (13 March 2010 – 17 June 2022 Retired)
- Luis Javier Argüello García (17 June 2022 – present)

== See also ==
- Roman Catholicism in Spain
