= José Cos y Macho =

Catholic cardinal

His Eminence José María Cos y Macho
- Cardinal Archbishop of Valladolid
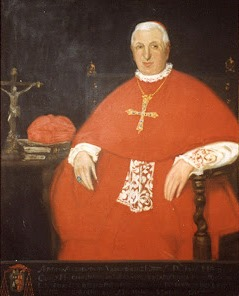
- Church: Roman Catholic
- Archdiocese: Valladolid
- Term ended: 24 April 1901
- Predecessor: Antonio María Cascajares y Azara
- Successor: Remigio Gandásegui y Gorrochátegui
- Other post: Cardinal-Priest of Santa Maria del Popolo
- Previous posts: Bishop of Mondoñedo (1886–1889); Archbishop of Santiago de Cuba (1889–1892); Archbishop of Madrid (1892–1901)

Orders
- Ordination: September 1862
- Consecration: 12 September 1886
- Created cardinal: 27 November 1911 by Pius X
- Rank: Cardinal-Priest

Personal details
- Born: 6 August 1838 Terán, Cabuérniga, Spain
- Died: 17 December 1919 (aged 81) Valladolid, Spain
- Buried: Cathedral of Valladolid

Styles of José Cos y Macho
- Reference style: His Eminence
- Spoken style: Your Eminence
- Informal style: Cardinal
- See: Valladolid

José María Justo Cos y Macho (6 August 1838 – 17 December 1919) was a Spanish Cardinal of the Roman Catholic Church who served as Archbishop of Valladolid from 1901 until his death, and was elevated to the cardinalate in 1911.

== Biography ==
José Cos was born in Terán, Cabuérniga, Cantabria, and baptized in the parish of Santa Eulalia three days later, on 9 August 1838. He studied at the Jesuit School in Segura, Seminary of Monte Corbán in Santander, and the University of Salamanca, where he obtained his doctorate in theology. Cos was ordained to the priesthood in September 1862, and finished his studies in 1864. He taught at the Conciliar Seminary of Santander from 1862 to 1865, and became a canon magister of the Cathedral of Oviedo in 1865. He was named secretary to Bishop Sebastián Espinosa de los Monteros in 1882, and archdeacon of the cathedral chapter of Córdoba in 1884, which he later exchanged for the post of canon maestreescuela of the cathedral chapter of Oviedo.

On 10 June 1886 Cos was appointed Bishop of Mondoñedo by Pope Leo XIII. He received his episcopal consecration on the following 12 September from Archbishop Victoriano Guisasola y Rodríguez, with Bishops Ramón Martínez Vigil, OP, and José Mazarrasa y Rivas serving as co-consecrators, in the Cathedral of Oviedo. Cos was promoted to Archbishop of Santiago de Cuba on 14 February 1889 and served as a senator of the Spanish Kingdom from 1891 until his death. He was later named Bishop of Madrid-Alcalá (with the personal title of "Archbishop") on 11 June 1892, and Archbishop of Valladolid on 18 April 1901.

Pope Pius X created him Cardinal Priest of Santa Maria del Popolo in the consistory of 27 November 1911. Cos was one of the cardinal electors who participated in the 1914 papal conclave, which selected Pope Benedict XV. Between the death of Joaquín Beltrán y Asensio on 3 November 1917 and the appointment of Enrique Pla y Deniel on 4 December 1918, he served as Apostolic Administrator of Ávila.

Cardinal Cos died from bronchopneumonia in Valladolid, at the age of 81. He is buried in the metropolitan cathedral of Valladolid.

Catholic Church titles
Preceded by José Palacios y López	Bishop of Mondoñedo; 1886–1889	Succeeded by Manuel Fernández de Castro y Menéndez
Preceded by José María Martín de Herrera y de la Iglesia	Archbishop of Santiago de Cuba; 1889–1892	Succeeded by Francisco Sáenz de Urturi y Crespo, OFM
Preceded by Ciriaco Sancha y Hervás	Archbishop of Madrid-Alcalá; 1892–1901	Succeeded by Victoriano Guisasola y Menendez
Preceded by Antonio María Cascajares y Azara	Archbishop of Valladolid; 1901–1919	Succeeded by Remigio Gandásegui y Gorrochátegui
