= La Vellés =

- Municipality
- Coat of arms

- Location in Salamanca

- Location in Spain
- Coordinates: 41°04′26″N 5°34′05″W
- Country: Spain
- Autonomous community: Castile and León
- Province: Salamanca
- Comarca: La Armuña

Government
  - Mayor: Francisco Antonio Bernal Nieto (PSOE)

Area
  - Total: 26 km^{2} (10 sq mi)
- Elevation: 812 m (2,664 ft)

Population (2025-01-01)
  - Total: 566
  - Density: 22/km^{2} (56/sq mi)
- Time zone: UTC+1 (CET)
  - Summer (DST): UTC+2 (CEST)
- Postal code: 37427

La Vellés is a municipality located in the province of Salamanca, Castile and León, Spain. As of 2016 the municipality has a population of 557 inhabitants.
