= José Bueno y Monreal =

Catholic cardinal (1904–1987)

His Eminence José María Bueno y Monreal
- Cardinal, Archbishop Emeritus of Seville
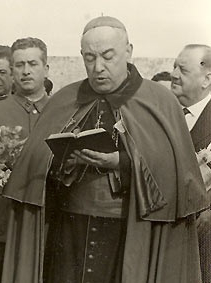
- Church: Catholic Church
- Archdiocese: Seville
- See: Seville
- Appointed: 8 April 1957
- Term ended: 22 May 1982
- Predecessor: Pedro Segura y Sáenz
- Successor: Carlos Amigo Vallejo
- Previous posts: Bishop of Jaca (1945–50); Bishop of Vitoria (1950–54); Titular Archbishop of Antiochia in Pisidia (1954–57); Coadjutor Archbishop of Seville (1954–57); Vice-President of the Spanish Episcopal Conference (1972–78)

Orders
- Ordination: 19 March 1927 by Rafael Merry del Val y Zulueta
- Consecration: 19 March 1946 by Leopoldo Eijo y Garay
- Created cardinal: 15 December 1958 by Pope John XXIII
- Rank: Cardinal Priest

Personal details
- Born: José María Bueno y Monreal; 11 September 1904 Zaragoza, Kingdom of Spain
- Died: 20 August 1987 (aged 82) Clínica de la Universidad de Navarra, Pamplona, Spain
- Education: Pontifical Gregorian University; University of Madrid

Styles of José Bueno y Monreal
- Reference style: His Eminence
- Spoken style: Your Eminence
- Informal style: Cardinal
- See: Seville

José María Bueno y Monreal (11 September 1904 – 20 August 1987) was a Spanish cardinal of the Catholic Church who served as archbishop of Seville from 1957 to 1982, and was elevated to the cardinalate in 1958.

== Biography ==
Born in Zaragoza, José Bueno studied at the Gregorian University in Rome. He was ordained to the priesthood on 19 March 1927, and then taught at the seminary in Madrid until 1945. Becoming a professor at Madrid's Superior Mason Institute of Religious Culture in 1929, Monreal also served as diocesan attorney general from 1935 to 1945, which was the same year he was made canon.

On 1 December 1945, he was appointed bishop of Jaca by Pius XII. Monreal received episcopal consecration on 19 March 1946 from the Bishop Leopoldo Eijo y Garay of Madrid, with bishops Casimiro Morcillo González and Luigi Muñoyerro serving as co-consecrators. He was later named bishop of Vitoria on 13 May 1950, and coadjutor archbishop of Seville and titular archbishop of Antiochia in Pisidia on 27 October 1954. As coadjutor, Monreal served under cardinal Pedro Segura y Sáenz.

Bueno y Monreal succeeded Cardinal Segura y Sáenz as archbishop of Seville on 8 April 1957. He was created cardinal-priest of Ss. Vito, Modesto e Crescenzia (pro hac vice to title) by Pope John XXIII in the consistory of 15 December 1958. From 1962 to 1965, Monreal attended the Second Vatican Council; along with Cardinal José Quintero Parra, he assisted Cardinal Paul Zoungrana in delivering one of the closing messages of the council on 8 December 1965. He was one of the cardinal electors who participated in the 1963 papal conclave, and again in the conclaves of August and October 1978.

Bueno y Monreal died in Pamplona, at age 82.

Catholic Church titles
Preceded by Juan Villar y Sanz	Bishop of Jaca; 1945–1950	Succeeded by Angel Hidalgo Ibáñez
Preceded by Carmelo Ballester y Nieto, CM	Bishop of Vitoria; 1950–1954	Succeeded by Francisco Peralta y Ballabriga
Preceded by Pedro Segura y Sáenz	Archbishop of Seville; 8 April 1957 – 22 May 1982	Succeeded by Carlos Amigo Vallejo
