= Primacy of the Spains =

Primacy covering the Iberian Peninsula

The Primacy of the Spains (Portuguese: Primaz das Espanhas; Spanish: Primado de las Españas, Catalan: Primat de les Espanyes) is the primacy of the Iberian Peninsula, historically known as Hispania or in the plural as the Spains. The Archbishop of Braga, in Portugal, has claimed this primacy over the whole Iberian Peninsula since the Middle Ages, however today his primacy is only recognized in Portugal. The Archbishop of Toledo in Spain has claimed the Primacy of Spain, as the primate above all other episcopal sees in Spain. In addition, the Archbishop of Tarragona in Catalonia also makes use of the title. The Archbishops in Braga, Toledo and Tarragona, if raised to the rank of cardinal, are known as Cardinal-Primates.

== Primacy of Braga ==
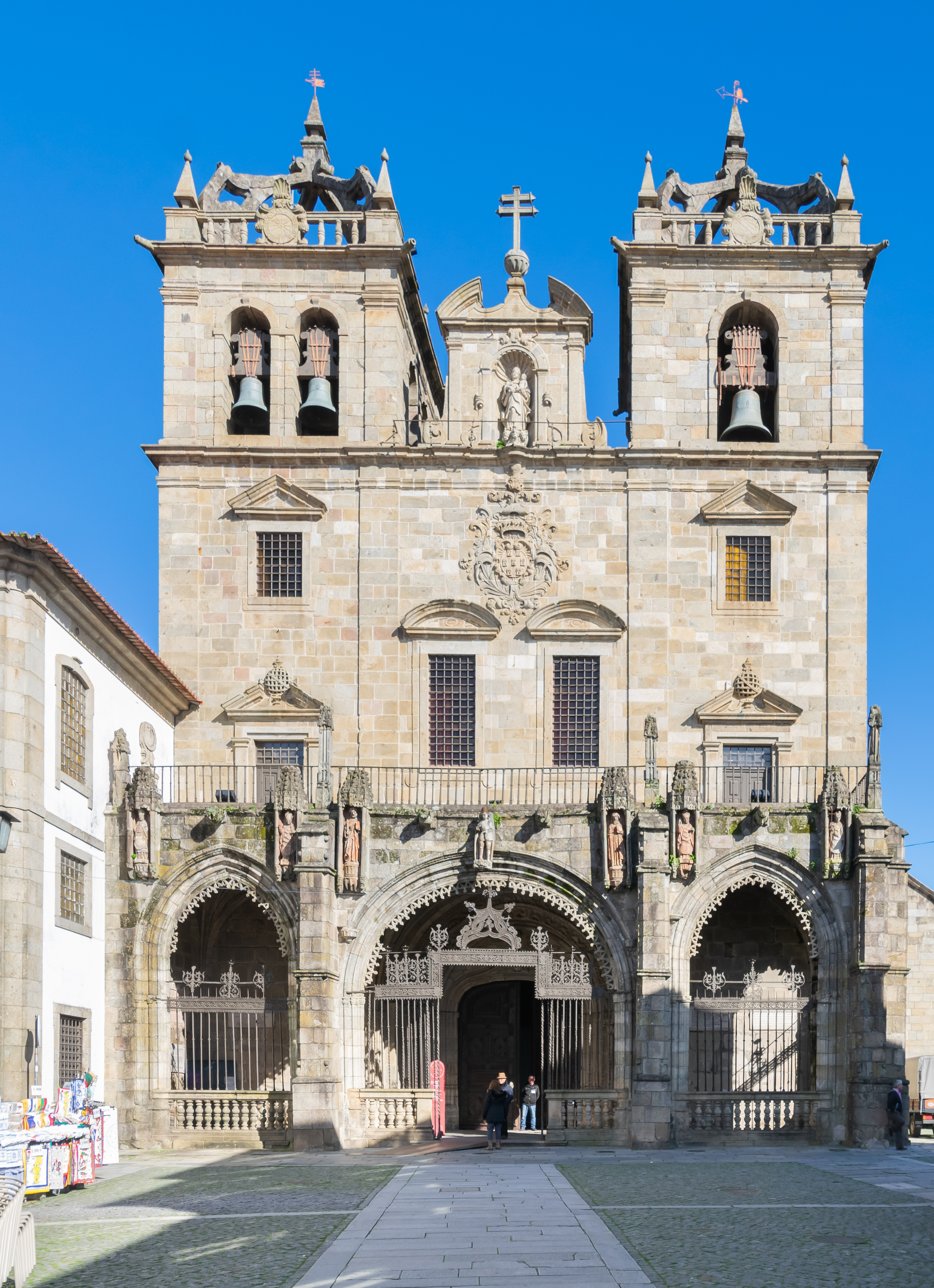
The Cathedral of Braga.

The Archbishop of Braga has claimed the title of Primate of the Spains (Portuguese: Primaz das Espanhas) both for being the oldest diocese on the Iberian Peninsula and for its role in the christianization of the Suebi Kingdom. Bishop Balconius (440-446) was the first to claim the title after being elevated to Archbishop for converting King Rechiar. For the newly created Kingdom of Portugal, Braga, capital of the former Kingdom of the Suebi and of the County of Portucale (that more immediately preceded the Kingdom) was the biggest religious site and fundamentally resisted by its jurisdiction over the dioceses of Coimbra and Zamora. Bishops such as João Peculiar and Estêvão Soares da Silva protest before the Pope, and Honorius III left the matter unresolved (papal bulls of January 19, 1218).

In 1364, the bishop of Braga João de Cardaillac decided to bear the title of Primate of the Spains. The prelation conflicts that took place during the Council of Trent (with Bishop Friar Bartolomeu dos Martyrs) produced a papal resolution to take into account the date of elevation of each bishop, with only protocolary consequences. In the brief «Reddite nobis» (January 10, 1562) he insists the maintenance of the traditional rights of Braga.

However, during the 14th century, the dioceses of Galicia and Leon ceased giving precedence to the Archbishop-Primate of Braga.

Despite this, the Archbishop-Primate of Braga still holds rank above all other archbishops in Portugal, except for the Patriarch of Lisbon ever since the latter was created in 1716.

== Primacy of Toledo ==
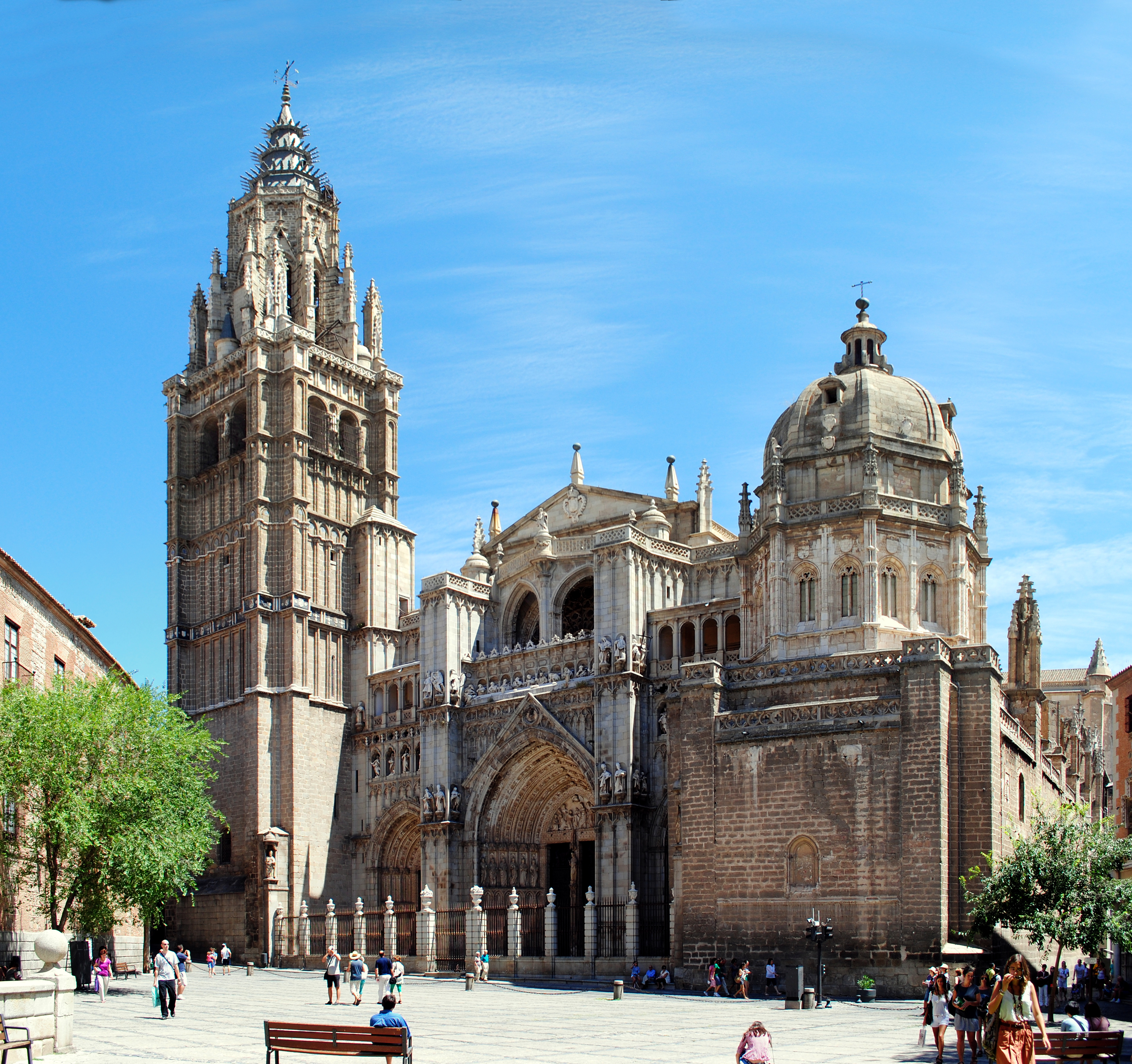
The Cathedral of Toledo.

The Diocletianic provinces of Hispania

Originally, after the provincial division by Diocletian in the 3rd century, the city of Toletum (now Toledo) was within the Roman province of Carthaginensis, whose capital was Carthago Nova (now Cartagena). Hispania's division into ecclesiastical dioceses was based on the Roman provincial divisions, so that the episcopal seat at Toledo was originally a dependent of the seat at Cartagena.

The problem arose in the mid 6th century when the Byzantine emperor Justinian seized control of an important strip of Hispania, including diocesan seats as important as Cartagena (renamed Carthago Spartaria by Justinian), Corduba, Begastri and Illici. The metropolitan seat and provincial capital were in the territory occupied by the Byzantines and so, shortly after taking the throne, the Visigoth king Gundemar promoted the holding of a synod in Toledo. That synod agreed that Toledo was the metropolitan of the whole province, seizing that title from the episcopal seat at Cartagena - that agreement was then endorsed by the king in a decree of 23 October 610.

The Islamic invasion in 711 left Toledo as a city under Islamic rule for the next 350 years, first way away from the frontier by the geographic boulder of the Duero river in the northern high plains, and later by the Central Sierras, as the frontier itself Taifa realm for another 80 years where contacts with the Christian kingdoms north would resume closer. That position left the See under Islamic suzerainty, tolerated as a heretic church of Allah but subject as Dhimmi or client as Jews were too, what would make it be respected but seen by Christian kings and their bishops with suspicion on its policies, influenced by the policies of Cordoba. After the re-conquest Toledo was held or contested by the Kingdom of Castille and the Kingdom of León and sometimes as Infantazgo by semi-independent queens of the royal house. During the Reconquista, the alliance between the monarchs and the church concentrated on the distinct privileges that one offered the other. Soon after Alfonso VI's conquest of Toledo, the pope issued the bulla Cunctis Sanctorum in 1088/1089, recognising the holders of the diocese of Toledo as "primates" and "metropolitans" as they had been during the Visigothic era, and dubiously and unofficially under Islamic rule.

== See also ==
- Council of Toledo
- Archdiocese of Toledo
- Cathedral of Toledo
