= Catholic Church in Africa =

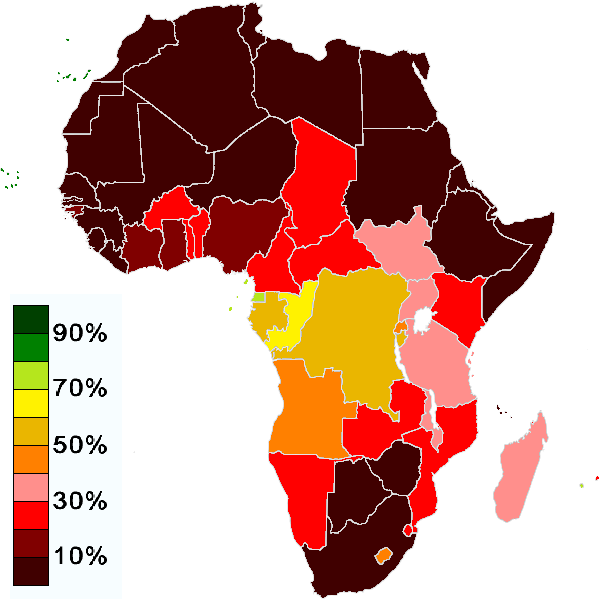
Catholicism in Africa by percentage

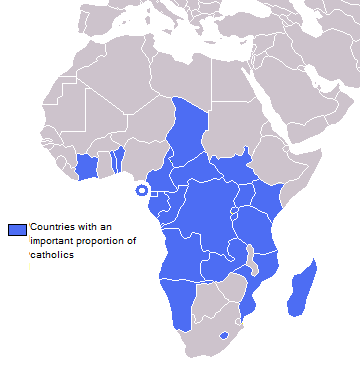
Countries in Africa with a significant Catholic population.

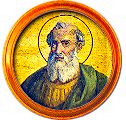
Pope Victor I was a Latinized Berber who established Latin as the official language of the Catholic Church in 195 A.D.

The Catholic Church in Africa is part of the worldwide Catholic Church in full communion with the Holy See in Rome.

Christian activity in Africa began in the 1st century when the Patriarchate of Alexandria in Egypt was formed as one of the four original Patriarchs of the East (the others being Constantinople, Antioch, and Jerusalem).

However, the Islamic conquest in the 7th century resulted in a harsh decline for Christianity in Northern Africa.

Yet, at least outside the Islamic majority parts of Northern Africa, the presence of the Catholic Church has grown in the modern era, in Africa as a whole, one of the reasons being the French colonization of several countries in Africa. Catholic Church membership rose from 2 million in 1900 to 140 million in 2000. In 2005, the Catholic Church in Africa, including Eastern Catholic Churches, embraced approximately 135 million of the 809 million people in Africa. In 2009, when Pope Benedict XVI visited Africa, it was estimated at 158 million. Most belong to the Latin Church, but there are also millions of members of the Eastern Catholic Churches. By 2025, one-sixth (230 million) of the world's Catholics are expected to be Africans.

The world's largest seminary is in Nigeria, which borders on Cameroon in western Africa, and Africa produces a large percentage of the world's priests. As of 26 June 2020, there are also 29 Cardinals from Africa, out of 222, and 400,000 catechists. Cardinal Peter Turkson, formerly Archbishop of Cape Coast, Ghana, was once Africa's youngest cardinal at 64 years old, and was also one of several prelates from Africa estimated as papabile for the Papacy in the papal conclave of 2013.

== History ==
=== Ancient era ===
Many important members of the early Church were from Africa, including Mark the Evangelist, Origen, Tertullian, Saint Augustine of Hippo (from Hippo Regius in what is now Annaba, Algeria) and Clement of Alexandria. Churches in eastern North Africa, such as those in Egypt and Ethiopia, tended to align with the practice of Eastern Christianity, but those to the West (the area now known as the Maghreb) generally were more Western in practice. Three early popes were from the Roman Africa Province. These were Pope Victor I (reigned c . 189 to 199), Pope Miltiades (reigned 311 to 314) and Pope Gelasius I (492 to 496); all three were North African men.

=== Under Islamic conquests and rule ===
Archaeological and scholarly research has shown that Christianity existed after the Muslim conquests, though the Catholic church gradually declined along with local Latin dialect.

Many causes have been seen as to leading to the decline of Christianity in Maghreb. One of them is the constant wars and conquests as well as persecutions. In addition many Christians also migrated to Europe. The Church at that time lacked the backbone of a monastic tradition and was still suffering from the aftermath of heresies including the so-called Donatist heresy, and that this contributed to the early obliteration of the Church in the present day Maghreb. Some historians contrast this with the strong monastic tradition in Coptic Egypt, which is credited as a factor that allowed the Coptic Church to remain the majority faith in that country until around after the 14th century despite numerous persecutions. In addition, the Romans and the Byzantines were unable to completely assimilate the indigenous people like the Berbers.

Another view is that Christianity in North Africa ended soon after conquest of North Africa by the Islamic Umayyad Caliphate between AD 647–709 effectively. However, new scholarship has appeared that disputes this. There are reports that Christianity persisted in the region from Tripolitania (present-day western Libya) to present-day Morocco for several centuries after the completion of the Arab conquest by 700. A Christian community is recorded in 1114 in Qal'a in central Algeria. There is also evidence of religious pilgrimages after 850 to tombs of Christian saints outside of the city of Carthage, and evidence of religious contacts with Christians of Arab Spain. In addition, calendrical reforms adopted in Europe at this time were disseminated amongst the indigenous Christians of Tunis, which would have not been possible had there been an absence of contact with Rome.

Local Catholicism came under pressure when the Muslim fundamentalist regimes of the Almoravids and especially the Almohads came into power, and the record shows persecutions and demands made that the local Christians of Tunis to convert to Islam. We still have reports of Christian inhabitants and a bishop in the city of Kairouan around 1150 – a significant report, since this city was founded by Arab Muslims around 680 as their administrative center after their conquest. A letter from the 14th century shows that there were then still four bishoprics left in North Africa, albeit a sharp decline from the over four hundred bishoprics in existence at the time of the Arab conquest. Berber Christians continued to live in Tunis and Nefzaoua in the south of Tunisia until the early 15th century, and "[i]n the first quarter of the fifteenth century, we even read that the native Christians of Tunis, though much assimilated, extended their church, perhaps because the last of the persecuted Christians from all over the Maghreb had gathered there." They were not in communion with the Catholic church of that time, however.

Another group of Christians who came to North Africa after being deported from Islamic Spain were called the Mozarabs. They were recognised as forming the Moroccan Church by Pope Innocent IV.

Christians in Morocco had mostly become slaves by the time of Ibn al-Ahmar and Ferdinand III of Castile. Celestine III had told Toledo's archbishop Martin to dispatch a priest for Christians in Morocco. Innocent III in 1198 requested the Almohads to allow the Trinitarian Order to perform its duties and in 1200 wrote a letter to the Christians enslaved there. Rebel Castilians had also served the Almohad caliphs and resided in Morocco. Pope Honorius III had requested the Almohads to allow the Christians to freely practice their faith. In June 1225, Honorius III issued the bull Vineae Domini custodes that permitted two friars of the Dominican Order named Dominic and Martin to establish a mission in Morocco and look after the affairs of Christians there. The friars of Francis of Assisi were dispatched to Morocco to evangelize to the Muslims but were killed.

Honorius III on 20 February 1226 told Rodrigo Jiménez de Rada to dispatch Franciscans to convert the Moroccan Muslims. This mission had proved very difficult due to the fact that Christianity was widely dispersed in the region. The first known bishop of Morocco was appointed by Pope Gregory IX on 12 June 1237. The sultan Abd al-Wahid II in 1233 received a letter from the Pope referring to Bishop Agnello as the bishop of Fez. Lope Fernandez de Ain was appointed as the bishop of Morocco but wasn't able to establish himself before the Marinids captured Fez in 1248. Innocent IV had named him bishop of Church of Africa on 19 December 1246.

The medieval Moroccan historian Ibn Abi Zar stated that the Almohad caliph Abu al-Ala Idris al-Ma'mun had built a church in Marrakesh for the Christians to freely practice their faith at Fernando III's insistence. Innocent IV asked emirs of Tunis, Ceuta and Bugia to permit Lope and Franciscian friars to look after the Christians in those regions. He thanked the Caliph al-Sa'id for granting protection to the Christians and requested to allow them to create fortresses along the shores, but the Caliph rejected this request. García Peréz was the archdeacon of Morocco during 1250s, but the local church was unable to support him and he had to depend on the Castilian church.

Before the Portuguese conquest of Ceuta, Franciscans were established there. A document dated 10 March 1413 shows that the Antipope John XXIII had chosen Aimary de Aurrilac as the bishop of Morocco in place of Fray Diego de Jerez.

=== Modern era ===
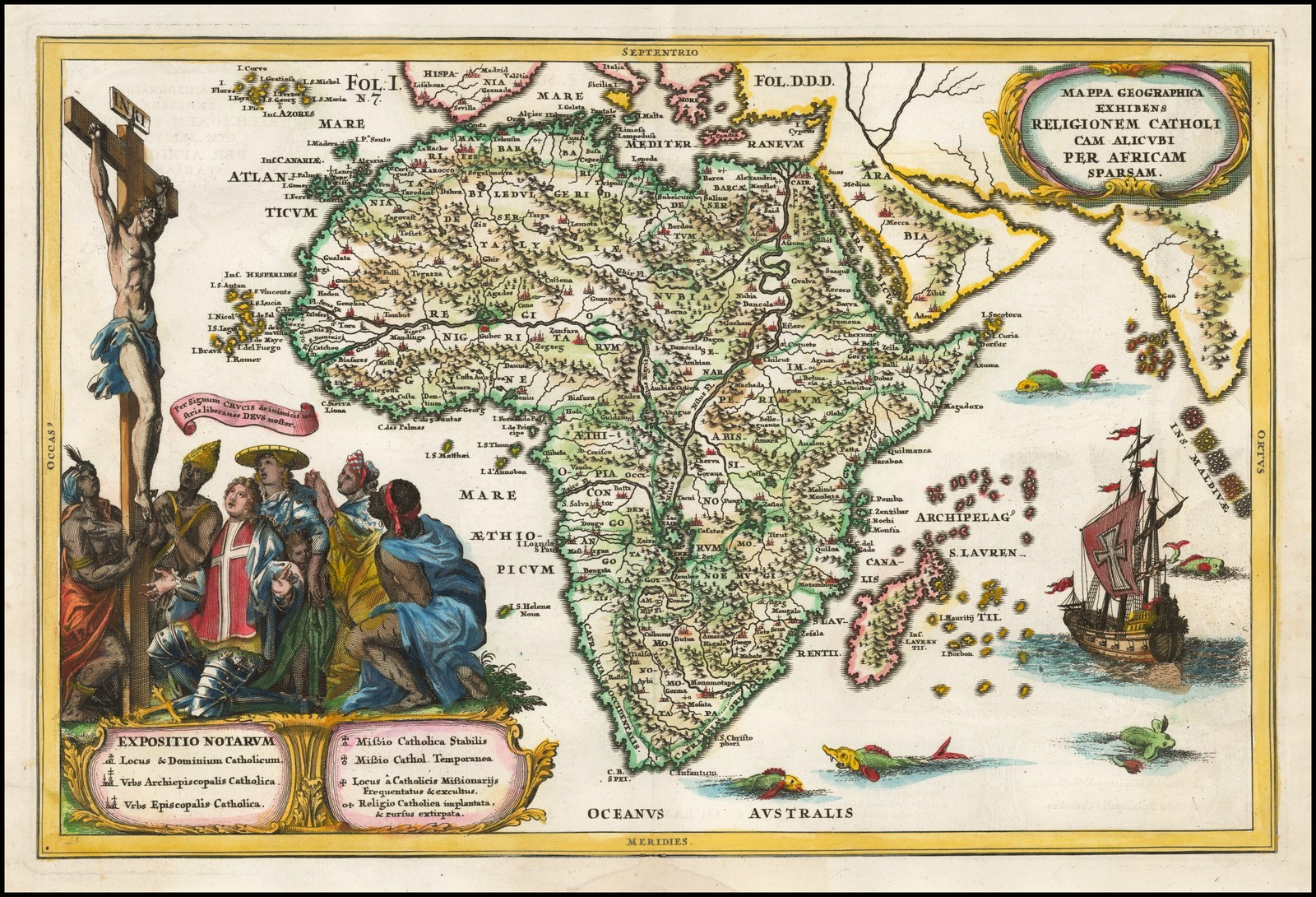
Heinrich Scherer, Mappa Geographica exhibens Religionem Catholicam alicubi per Africam sparsam, circa 1710

Another phase of Christianity in Africa began with the arrival of Portuguese in the 15th century. After the end of Reconquista, the Christian Portuguese and Spanish captured many ports in North Africa. The bishopric of Marrakesh continued to exist until the late 16th century and was borne by the suffragans of Seville. Juan de Prado who had attempted to re-establish the mission was killed in 1631. A Franciscan monastery built in 1637 was destroyed in 1659 after the downfall of the Saadi dynasty. A small Franciscan chapel and monastery in the mellah of the city existed until the 18th century.

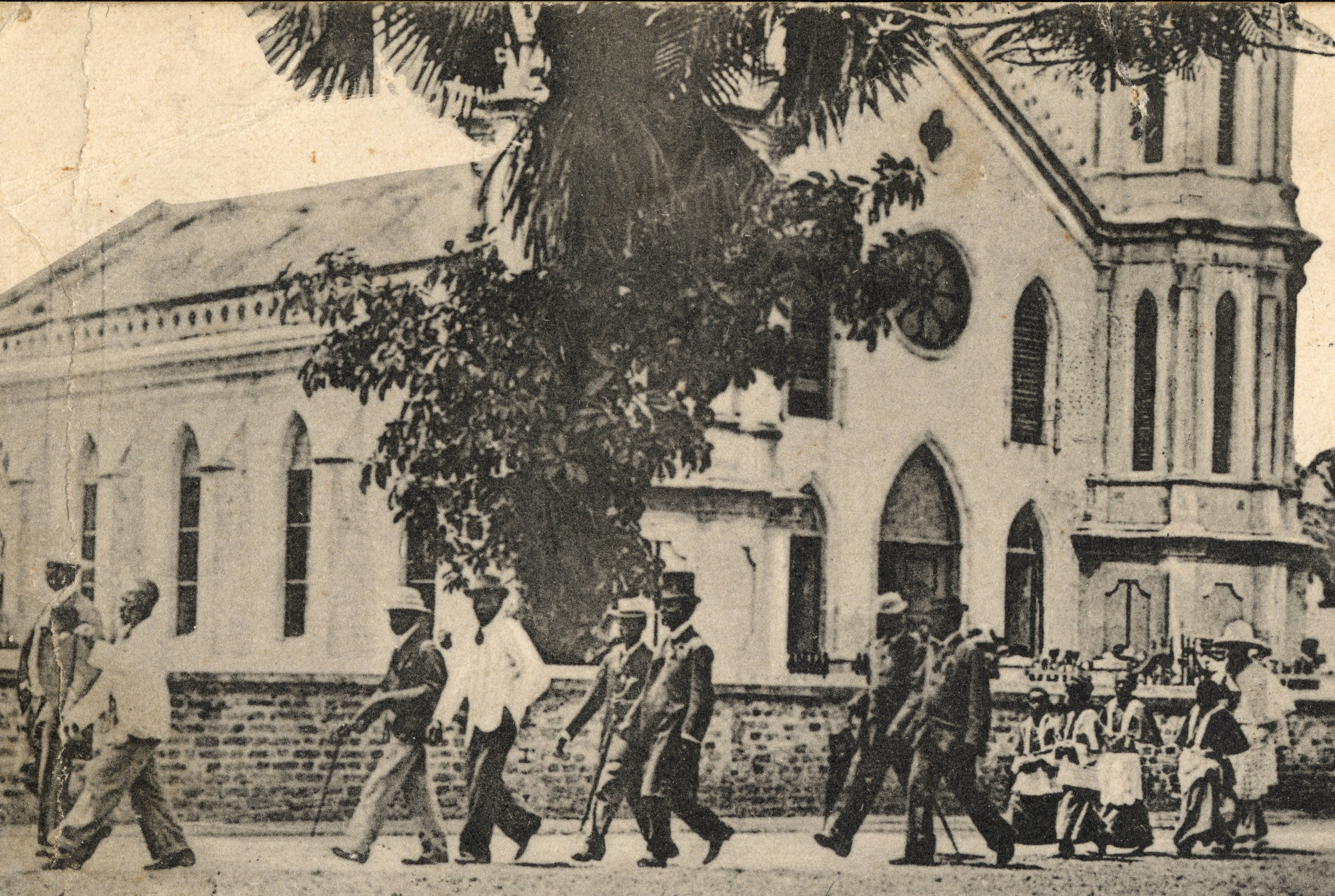
A Catholic church building in Lagos, Nigeria around 1917.

== Eastern Catholic Churches ==
The Latin Church remains the largest throughout the continent. However, in eastern Africa, there has been an emergence of Alexandrian Rite Eastern Catholic Churches: the Coptic Catholic Church, the Ethiopian Catholic Church, and the Eritrean Catholic Church (2015).

== Catholic monarchs ==
Despite prevalent republican governments in contemporary time, Africa has a tradition of Catholic monarchs, such as in the kingdoms of Congo, Uganda, Rwanda, and Burundi.

== Modern African papabili ==
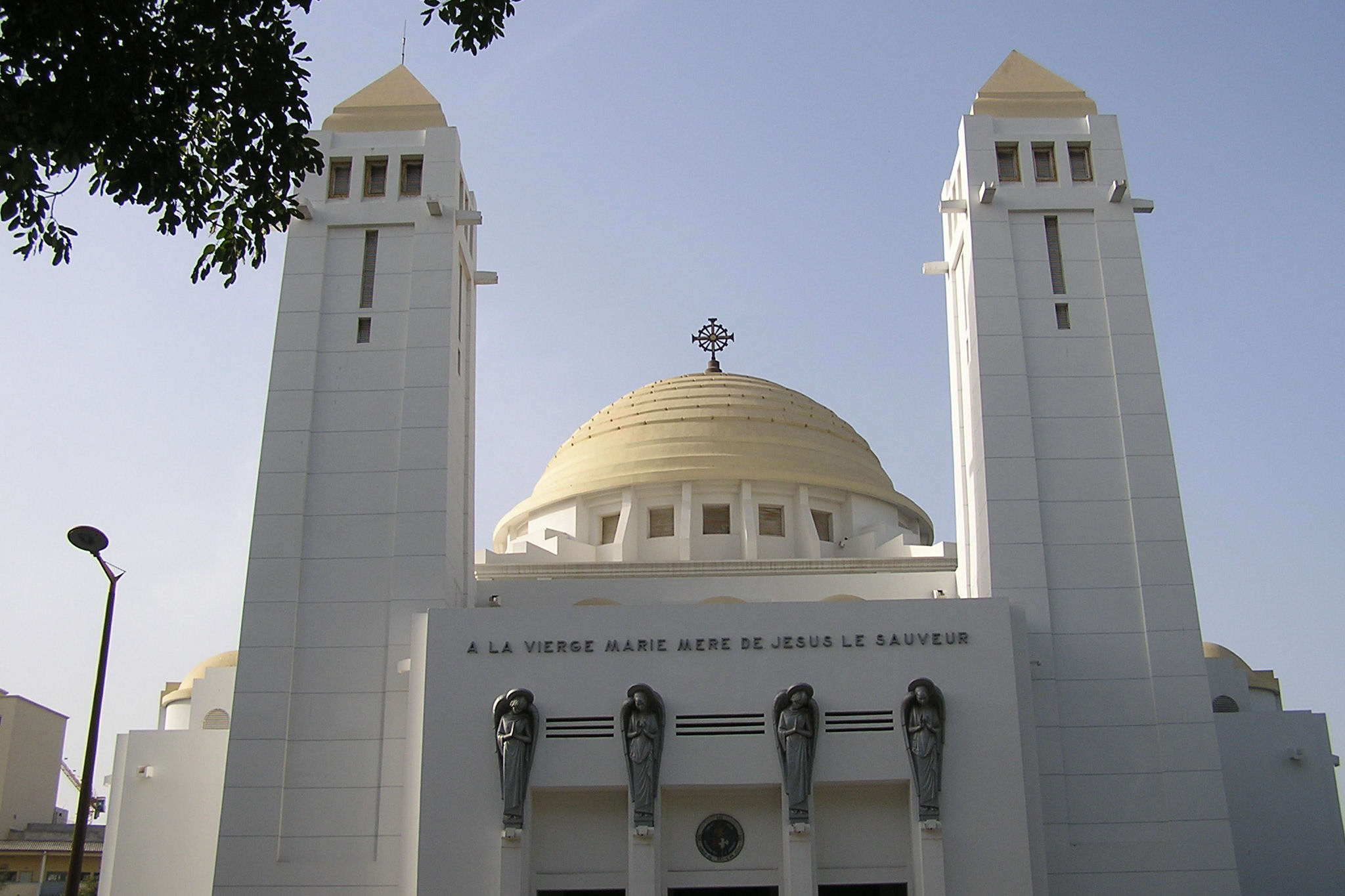
Our Lady of Victories Cathedral, Dakar

According to Philip Jenkins, the 20th century saw major changes for the Catholic Church. By 1960, the College of Cardinals had its first Sub-Saharan African, Laurean Rugambwa. By deliberate policy, John Paul II selected many Cardinals from Third World nations, and by 2001 they made up over 40 percent of the body. In 2002, Italian Cardinals made up just 15 percent of the College, a drop from 60 percent in the 1950s.

Jenkins saw the conservatism of Pope John Paul II as particularly attractive to Catholics in developing nations and likely to be a dominant force in Catholic politics for some time. Francis Arinze, a Nigerian Cardinal and adviser to Pope John Paul II, was considered papabile before the 2005 papal conclave, which elected Benedict XVI. As Arinze was considered theologically conservative, Jenkins suggests he would have brought African "notions of authority and charisma" to the office, rather than democracy.

Jenkins states, "The prospect of a Black African pope understandably excites Christians of all political persuasions." Even Cardinal Joseph Ratzinger, three years before his own selection as Pope, labeled the prospect of an African pope as "entirely plausible" and a "wonderful sign for all Christianity." According to Financial Times, an African such as Arinze would "boost the popularity" of the church, which is facing strong competition in Africa from Pentecostal, Baptist, and Evangelical denominations. The Daily Telegraph has said that an "African papacy is the logical outcome" given that the majority of Catholics now live in the developing world, and in particular, the Catholic Church in Africa "has grown by 20 times since 1980."

In the papal conclave of 2013, Cardinal Peter Turkson of Ghana was called "the most likely" candidate from Africa and was considered the favorite to win the papacy before the election of Jorge Mario Bergoglio in 2013. Furthermore, Cardinal Robert Sarah has been mentioned in the press as a possible candidate for the papacy, both in 2013 and in future conclaves.

== Issues ==
=== Islamist persecution ===
Persecution of Christians by Islamists, such as Boko Haram in Nigeria, remains one of the hardest issues to solve for the Catholic Church in Africa.

=== Celibacy ===
Although Catholic priestly vow of celibacy is a general challenge for all priests in the Catholic Church, for instance because of cultural expectations for a man to have a family, Africa presents particular problems in the subject. Early in the 21st century, as celibacy continued to come under question, Africa was cited as a region where the violation of celibacy is particularly rampant. Priests on the continent were accused of taking wives and concubines. Isolation of priests working in rural Africa, and the low status of women, is said to add to the temptation. A breakaway sect of married previously Catholic priests in Uganda, called the Catholic Apostolic National Church, formed in 2010 following the excommunication of a married priest by Pope Benedict XVI.

== See also ==
- List of saints from Africa
- Catholic Church in Asia
- Catholic Church in Europe
- Catholic Church in North America
- Catholic Church in Latin America
- Catholic Church in Oceania
