= Francisco de Vera-Villavicencio =

Spanish Catholic bishop (died 1616)

Most Reverend Francisco de Vera-Villavicencio
- Bishop of Perpignan-Elne
- Church: Catholic Church
- Diocese: Diocese of Perpignan-Elne
- In office: 1613–1616
- Predecessor: Antonio Gallart Traginer
- Successor: Federico Cornet
- Previous posts: Auxiliary Bishop of Seville (1603–1613); Titular Bishop of Madaurus (1603–1613)

Orders
- Consecration: 1603 by Fernando Niño de Guevara

Personal details
- Died: 4 July 1616

Francisco de Vera-Villavicencio, O. de M. (died 1616) was a Roman Catholic prelate who served as Bishop of Perpignan-Elne (1613–1616), Auxiliary Bishop of Seville (1603–1613), Titular Bishop of Madaurus (1603–1613).

== Biography ==
Francisco de Vera-Villavicencio was ordained a priest in the Order of the Blessed Virgin Mary of Mercy. On 4 Jul 1603, he was appointed during the papacy of Pope Clement VIII as Titular Bishop of Madaurus and Auxiliary Bishop of Seville. In 1603, he was consecrated bishop by Fernando Niño de Guevara, Archbishop of Seville. On 18 Mar 1613, he was appointed during the papacy of Pope Paul V as Bishop of Perpignan-Elne. He served as Bishop of Perpignan-Elne until his death on 4 Jul 1616.

== External links and additional sources ==
- Cheney, David M. "Archdiocese of Sevilla {Seville}". Catholic-Hierarchy.org. (for Chronology of Bishops) ^{[self-published]}
- Chow, Gabriel. "Metropolitan Archdiocese of Sevilla (Italy)". GCatholic.org. (for Chronology of Bishops) ^{[self-published]}
- Cheney, David M. "Madaurus (Titular See)". Catholic-Hierarchy.org. (for Chronology of Bishops) ^{[self-published]}
- Chow, Gabriel. "Titular Episcopal See of Madaurus (Algeria)". GCatholic.org. (for Chronology of Bishops) ^{[self-published]}
- Cheney, David M. "Diocese of Perpignan-Elne". Catholic-Hierarchy.org. (for Chronology of Bishops) ^{[self-published]}
- Chow, Gabriel. "Diocese of Perpignan–Elne (France)". GCatholic.org. (for Chronology of Bishops) ^{[self-published]}

Catholic Church titles
Preceded by	Titular Bishop of Madaurus; 1603–1613	Succeeded by Juan Suárez
Preceded by Michael Fitzwalter	Auxiliary Bishop of Seville; 1603–1613	Succeeded by Juan de la Sal
Preceded by Antonio Gallart Traginer	Bishop of Perpignan-Elne; 1613–1616	Succeeded by Federico Cornet
