= Fernando Niño de Guevara =

Cardinal, Archbishop of Seville and Spanish Grand Inquisitor

His Eminence Fernando Niño de Guevara
- Cardinal Archbishop of Seville; Cardinal-priest of Santi Silvestro e Martino ai Monti
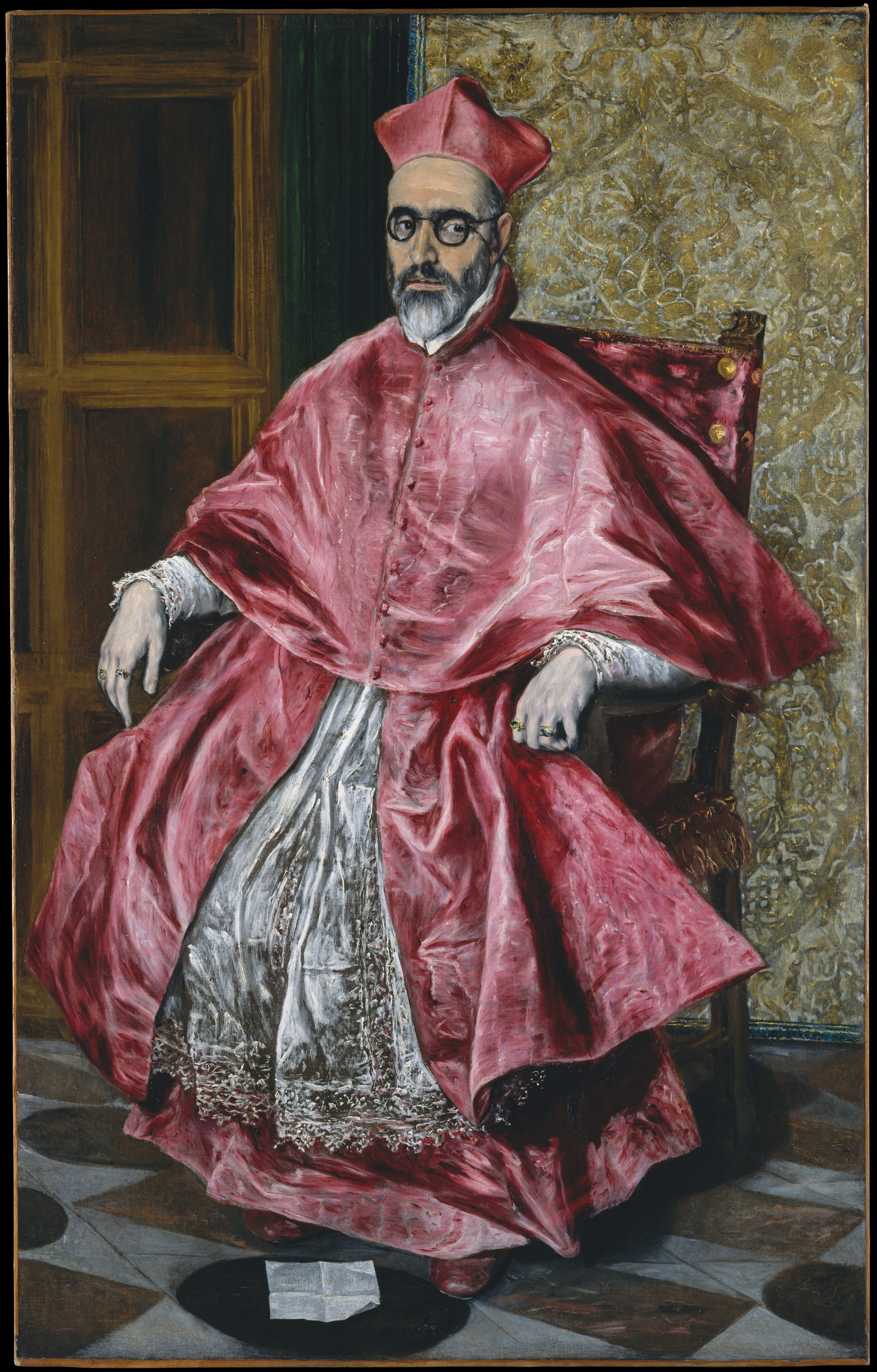
- Portrait of Fernando Niño de Guevara by El Greco.
- Archdiocese: Seville
- See: Seville
- Installed: 30 April 1601
- Term ended: 8 January 1609
- Predecessor: Rodrigo de Castro Osorio
- Successor: Pedro de Castro y Quiñones
- Other post: Cardinal-priest of Santi Silvestro e Martino ai Monti
- Previous posts: Cardinal-priest of San Biagio dell'Anello (1597-1599); Titular archbishop of Philippi (1599-1601); Grand Inquisitor of Spain (1600-1602)

Orders
- Consecration: 10 October 1599 by Pope Clement VIII
- Created cardinal: 5 June 1596 by Pope Clement VIII
- Rank: Cardinal-priest

Personal details
- Born: 1541 Toledo, Spain
- Died: 8 January 1609 (aged 68) Seville, Spain
- Denomination: Roman Catholic
- Occupation: Lawyer
- Education: University of Salamanca
- Coat of arms: Fernando Niño de Guevara's coat of arms

Ordination history of Fernando Niño de Guevara
History
Episcopal consecration
- Principal consecrator: Pope Clement VIII
- Co-consecrators: Camillo Borghese; Alfonso Visconti
Cardinalate
- Elevated by: Pope Clement VIII
Episcopal succession
Bishops consecrated by Fernando Niño de Guevara as principal consecrator
- Tomás de Borja: 9 April 1600
- Juan Bautista Acevedo Muñoz: 17 June 1601
- Francisco de Vera-Villavicencio: ?
- Juan de la Sal: ?

Fernando Niño de Guevara (1541 – 8 January 1609) was a Spanish cardinal who was also Archbishop of Seville and Grand Inquisitor of Spain.

== Biography ==
Fernando Niño de Guevara was born in Toledo, Spain in 1541, the son of Rodrigo Niño, Marquis of Tejares. An uncle, also named Fernando Niño de Guevara (d. 1552), was Archbishop of Granada from 1542 to 1552. He studied law at the University of Salamanca. He then moved to Cuenca, Spain, where he became archdeacon of the cathedral. In 1570, he became an oidor in Valladolid. He became a member of the Council of Castile in 1580.

On 3 December 1599 he was appointed Grand Inquisitor of Spain. During his tenure as Grand Inquisitor, the Spanish Inquisition burned 240 heretics, plus 96 in effigy. 1,628 other individuals were found guilty and subjected to lesser penalties.

On 10 Oct 1599, he was consecrated bishop by Pope Clement VIII with Camillo Borghese, Cardinal-Priest of Santi Giovanni e Paolo, and Alfonso Visconti, Bishop of Cervia, serving as co-consecrators.

In 1600 he had a portrait painted by El Greco. On 30 April 1601 he was also appointed Archbishop of Seville.

Fernando Niño de Guevara engaged the Jesuits in a dispute about the nature of papal authority. As a result, Pope Clement VIII prevailed on Philip III of Spain to induce him to resign as Grand Inquisitor in 1602.

He did, however, retain his duties as Archbishop of Seville. In this capacity, he called a synod in 1604 in order to suppress the confraternities and replace them with similar institutions dominated by clerics.

He died, probably in Seville, on 8 January 1609. He is buried in the Convent of San Pablo in Toledo.

== Episcopal succession ==
While bishop, he was the principal consecrator of:

- Tomás de Borja, Bishop of Malaga (1600);
- Juan Bautista Acevedo Muñoz, Bishop of Valladolid (1601);
- Juan de la Sal, Titular Bishop of Hippo Diarrhytus and Auxiliary Bishop of Seville (1603); and
- Francisco de Vera-Villavicencio, Titular Bishop of Madaurus and Auxiliary Bishop of Seville (1603).

Catholic Church titles
Preceded by Guido Pepoli	Cardinal-Priest of San Biagio dell'Anello; 1597–1599	Succeeded by Bonviso Bonvisi
Preceded by Francesco Cornaro (iuniore)	Cardinal-Priest of Santi Silvestro e Martino ai Monti; 1599–1609	Succeeded by Domenico Rivarola
Preceded by Jan Zamoyski	Titular Archbishop of Philippi; 1599–1601	Succeeded by Sasbout Vosmeer
Preceded by Pedro de Portocarrero	Grand Inquisitor of Spain; 1600–1602	Succeeded by Juan de Zúñiga Flores
Preceded by Rodrigo de Castro Osorio	Archbishop of Seville; 1601–1609	Succeeded by Pedro de Castro y Quiñones
