= Romualdo Antonio Mon y Velarde =

- Archbishop of Seville
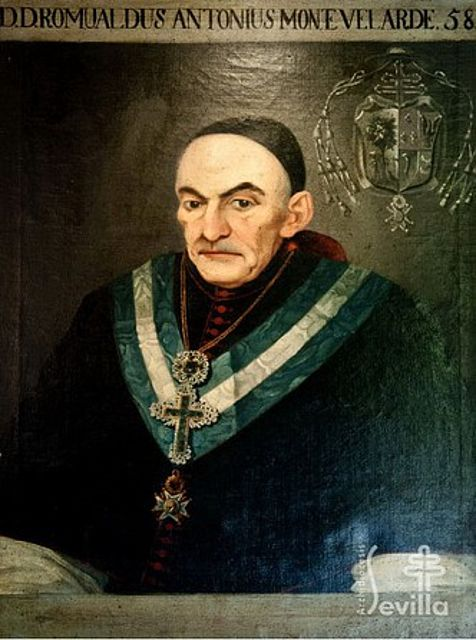
- Church: Catholic Church
- Archdiocese: Archdiocese of Seville
- In office: 23 September 1816 – 16 December 1819
- Predecessor: Luis María de Borbón y Vallabriga
- Successor: Francisco Javier de Cienfuegos y Jovellanos
- Previous post: Archbishop of Tarragona (1803-1816)

Orders
- Consecration: 8 April 1804 by Agustín Ayestarán y Landa

Personal details
- Born: 1749 San Martín de Oscos, Asturias, Kingdom of Spain
- Died: 16 December 1819 (aged 69–70)

Romualdo Antonio Mon y Velarde (1749–1819) was a Spanish bishop. He was archbishop of Tarragona and archbishop of Seville (1816–1819).

| Preceded by vacant since 1800 | Archbishop of Seville; 1816–1819 | Succeeded by Francisco Javier de Cienfuegos y Jovellanos |
