= Portrait of Fernando Niño de Guevara =

Painting by El Greco

- Portrait of a Cardinal, Probably Don Fernando Niño de Guevara
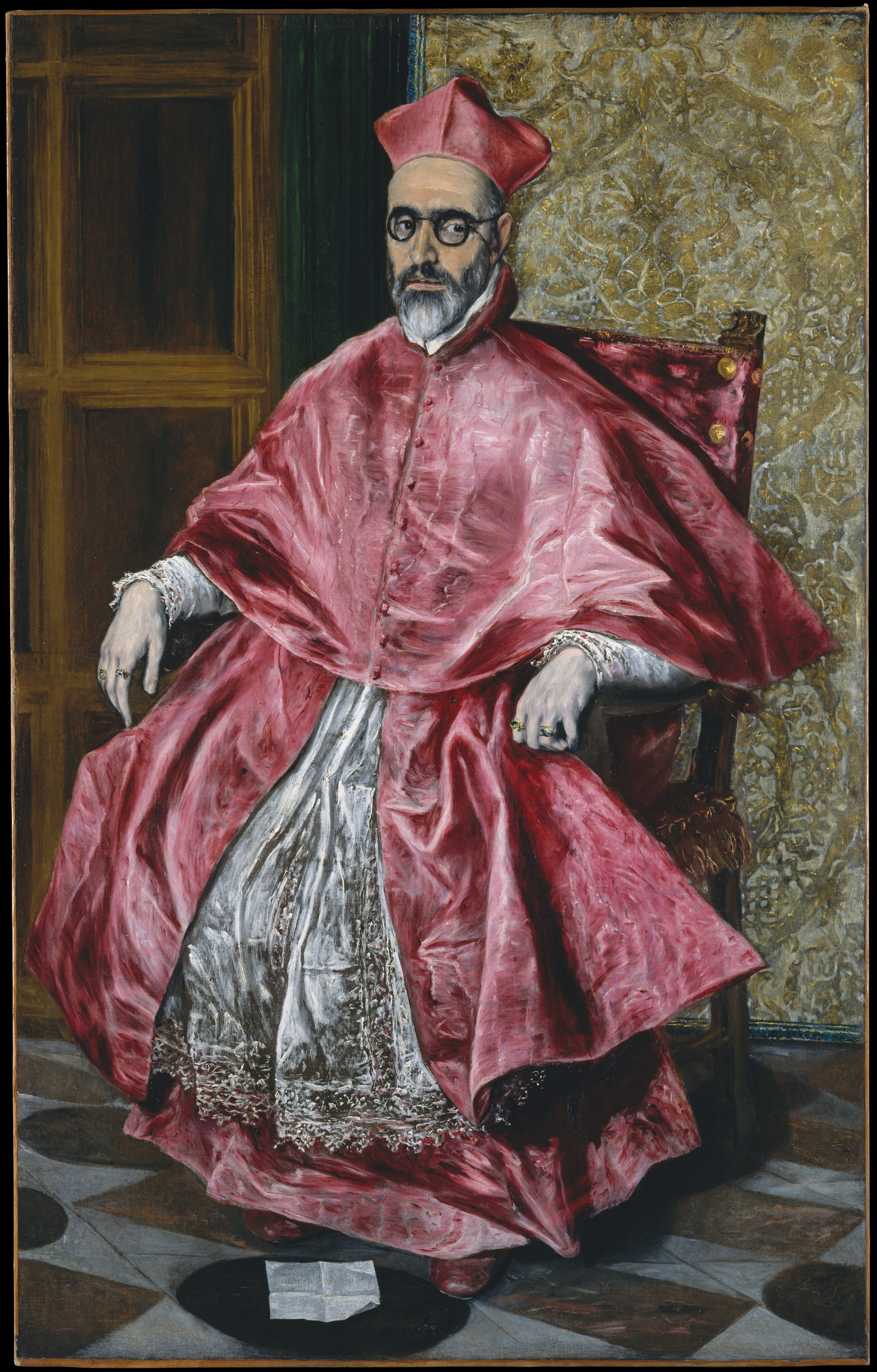
- Year: c. 1600
- Medium: oil paint, canvas
- Movement: Mannerism
- Dimensions: 171 cm × 108 cm (67 in × 43 in)
- Location: Metropolitan Museum of Art, New York City

Portrait of Fernando Niño de Guevara is a 1600 painting of cardinal Fernando Niño de Guevara by El Greco, now in the Metropolitan Museum of Art in New York.

In the article, "Three Paintings by El Greco", Walter Liedtke theorizes that it was the nephew of Cardinal Guevara, Pedro Lasso, who commissioned his portrait. In Spain during this time it was a novelty to commission a portrait of oneself (outside of courtiers); therefore it is most likely to have been a family member who commissioned this portrait. Conde de Los Arcos (Pedro Lasso), was an established patron of El Greco at the time when this portrait was commissioned. Lasso was a prominent member of the Spanish court and one of the only titled noble members among El Greco's group of friends and acquaintances. At the time of Lasso's death, he is said to have owned seven or eight El Greco paintings, although it is unclear whether the portrait of Cardinal Fernando Nino de Guevara was among this group.

The commission of this painting likely occurred in the spring of 1600, when the Cardinal visiting Toledo for several weeks. As Katharine Baetjer notes, Guevara was named cardinal of San Martino ai Monti in 1596 and thereafter traveled to Rome. In 1599, the Cardinal then received a nomination and subsequent promotion to Inquisitor General of Spain, and made a trip to Toledo. It is possible that, during the Cardinal's visit to Toledo, Conde de Los Arcos may have recommended El Greco to his uncle. Although Guevara had siblings who could have commissioned his portrait, during this time, his sisters were dedicated to various convents and his brother, Rodrigo, lived primarily in the Spanish Netherlands and was likely not in Spain often enough to know the prominence and popularity of the work of El Greco.

This portrait may have served as a celebration of family pride. Liedtke also notes that, “among the many works of art that Pedro Lasso collected and commissioned were family portraits and portraits of public figures, including famous churchmen and Spanish royalty.” Pedro Lasso may have used the commission of this portrait of his uncle as a ‘public gesture,’ and placed it in a “residence, family chapel, or an institution such as a church that he was known to support.” If this portrait were hung in a public space, it would serve to indicate two ways in which the family's status would have been elevated: having a prominent member of the church as a relative, and having a well-known artist (who by this time had received at least one commission from King Philip II) paint the portrait.

The painting of the portrait was fictionalised in the 1936 novel El Greco malt den Großinquisitor by Stefan Andres. In the 1947 film Lady in Ermine, the inquisitor (Ricardo Calvo Agostí) sits for his portrait and judges a trial involving a Jewish silversmith in love with El Greco's (fictional) daughter. The 2007 film El Greco (directed by Yannis Smaragdis) includes a fictional incident of the cardinal (played by Juan Diego Botto) trying El Greco before the Inquisition.

== Appropriations ==
The Portrait of Fernando Niño de Guevara appears in several paintings by the painter Herman Braun-Vega as a disturbing presence. In the painting El poder se nutre de dogmas, by accompanying the Portrait of Innocent X, it also evokes for Braun-Vega the influence of El Greco on Velázquez.

== See also ==
- List of works by El Greco
