= Martín Cabeza de Vaca =

Catholic bishop

- Titular Bishop of Marocco o Marrueco; Auxiliary Bishop of Seville
- Church: Catholic Church
- Archdiocese: Archdiocese of Seville
- In office: 1508–1534

Personal details
- Died: 1534 Seville, Spain

Martín Cabeza de Vaca (died 1534) was a Roman Catholic prelate who served as Auxiliary Bishop of Seville (1508–1534).

== Biography ==
Martín Cabeza de Vaca was ordained a priest in the Order of Preachers. On 28 Jan 1508, he was appointed during the papacy of Pope Julius II as Auxiliary Bishop of Seville and Titular Bishop of Marocco o Marruecos. He served as Auxiliary Bishop of Seville until his death in 1534.

== External links and additional sources ==
- Cheney, David M. "Archdiocese of Sevilla {Seville}". Catholic-Hierarchy.org. (for Chronology of Bishops) ^{[self-published]}
- Chow, Gabriel. "Metropolitan Archdiocese of Sevilla (Italy)". GCatholic.org. (for Chronology of Bishops) ^{[self-published]}
