= Reginaldo Romero =

Most Reverend Reginaldo Romero
- Titular Bishop of Tiberias; Auxiliary Bishop of Seville
- Church: Catholic Church
- Archdiocese: Archdiocese of Seville
- In office: 1488–1507

Orders
- Consecration: Jul 1488 by Diego Hurtado de Mendoza y Quiñones

Personal details
- Died: 1507 Seville, Spain

Reginaldo Romero (died 1507) was a Roman Catholic prelate who served as Auxiliary Bishop of Seville (1488–1507) and Tiberias (1488–1507).

== Biography ==
Reginaldo Romero was ordained a priest in the Order of Preachers. On March 17, 1488, he was appointed during the papacy of Pope Innocent VIII as Auxiliary Bishop of Seville and Titular Bishop of Tiberias. In Jul 1488, he was consecrated bishop by Diego Hurtado de Mendoza y Quiñones, Archbishop of Seville. He served as Auxiliary Bishop of Seville until his death in 1507.

== External links and additional sources ==
- Cheney, David M. "Tiberias (Titular See)". Catholic-Hierarchy.org. (for Chronology of Bishops) ^{[self-published]}
- Chow, Gabriel. "Titular Episcopal See of Tiberias (Israel)". GCatholic.org. (for Chronology of Bishops) ^{[self-published]}
- Cheney, David M. "Archdiocese of Sevilla {Seville}". Catholic-Hierarchy.org. (for Chronology of Bishops) ^{[self-published]}
- Chow, Gabriel. "Metropolitan Archdiocese of Sevilla (Italy)". GCatholic.org. (for Chronology of Bishops) ^{[self-published]}

Catholic Church titles
Preceded by Jean Puget	Titular Bishop of Tiberias; 1488–1507	Succeeded by Guido de Daudrellen
Preceded by	Auxiliary Bishop of Seville; 1488–1507	Succeeded by
