= Zeferino González y Díaz Tuñón =

Spanish Dominican cardinal and philosopher (1831–1894)

His Eminence Zeferino González y Díaz Tuñón
- Archbishop Emeritus of Sevilla
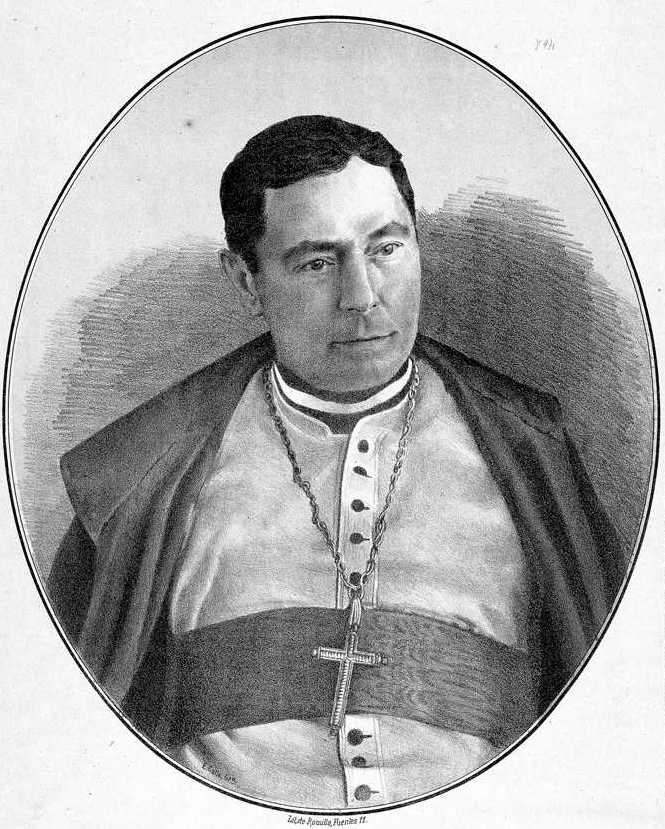
- Church: Catholic Church
- Archdiocese: Seville
- See: Seville
- Installed: 15 March 1883 (first); 15 January 1886 (second)
- Term ended: 27 March 1885 (first); 28 November 1889 (second)
- Predecessor: Joaquín Lluch y Garriga (first); Bienvenido Monzón y Martín (second)
- Successor: Bienvenido Monzón y Martín (first); Benito Sanz y Forés (second)
- Other post: Cardinal-Priest of Santa Maria sopra Minerva (1887-94)
- Previous posts: Bishop of Malaga (1874-75); Bishop of Córdoba (1875-83); Patriarch of Indias Occidentales (1885-86); Archbishop of Toledo (1885-86)

Orders
- Ordination: January 1854
- Consecration: 24 October 1875 by Manuel García Gil
- Created cardinal: 10 November 1884 by Pope Leo XIII
- Rank: Cardinal-Priest

Personal details
- Born: 28 January 1831 Villoria, Asturias, Kingdom of Spain
- Died: 29 November 1894 (aged 63) La Pasión convent, Madrid, Spanish Kingdom
- Education: University of Santo Tomas, Manila

Styles of Cardinal Zeferino González y Díaz Tuñón
- Reference style: Monseñor
- Spoken style: Su Eminencia Reverendísima
- Religious style: Reverendísimo
- Informal style: Cardinal

Zeferino González y Díaz Tuñón (28 January 1831 – 29 November 1894) was a Spanish Dominican theologian and philosopher, Archbishop of Seville and cardinal.

== Life ==
On 28 November 1844, in the College of Ocania, González entered the Dominican Order, and a year later took his solemn vows. He was sent to Manila in 1848 to complete his studies, and in January 1853, he was made a lector of philosophy. The following year he was ordained priest. After teaching philosophy and theology for many years in the University of Santo Tomas, Manila, he returned to Spain in 1867, where, the year following, he was elected rector of Ocania College, discharging the duties of this office for three years.

In 1874, he was named Bishop of Málaga, but, before taking charge of this diocese, he was consecrated Bishop of Córdoba in October 1875. Eight years later he was removed to the archiepiscopal See of Seville, and in November 1884, he was created cardinal by Pope Leo XIII, with Santa Maria sopra Minerva as his titular church.

In May 1885, Cardinal González was appointed to the primacy of Spain, was made Patriarch of the West Indies, vicar-general of the army, and major-chaplain to the royal chapel. After many years of service González, in December 1889, resigned all his offices and dignities, except that of the cardinalate, and retired from active life. The remaining five years of his life were spent in study and prayer.

He was honoured with medals of Isabella the Catholic and Charles III, he was appointed chancellor of Castile, was chosen as royal adviser, made a member of the Royal Academy of Languages, of History, of Moral and Political Sciences, and of the Roman Academy of St. Thomas Aquinas.

== Works ==
Besides those below, among his several works are: "La Biblia y la ciencia"; "La infalibilidad pontificia" (pamphlet); "Discurso de recepción en la Academia Española" (pamphlet); "Discurso de recepción en la Academia de Ciencias políticas y morales" (pamphlet).

- Estudios religiosos, políticos, científicos y sociales – volume 1, Madrid 1873

Contains the three essays:

La filosofía de la historia
La inmortalidad del alma y sus destinos segun una teoría krauso-espiritista
El positivismo materialista

- Estudios religiosos, políticos, científicos y sociales – volume 2, Madrid 1873

Contains the five essays:

La Economia política y el cristianismo
Los temblores de tierra
Sobre una Biblioteca de teólogos españoles
La definición de la infalibilidad pontificia
Sermon de Santo Tomás de Aquino

- Filosofía elemental – volume 1, second edition, Madrid 1876
- Filosofía elemental – volume 2, second edition, Madrid 1876
- Historia de la filosofía – volume 1, second edition, Madrid 1886
- Historia de la filosofía – volume 2, second edition, Madrid 1886
- Historia de la filosofía – volume 3, second edition, Madrid 1886
- Historia de la filosofía – volume 4, second edition, Madrid 1886
- Estudios sobre la filosofía de Santo Tomás – volume 1, second edition, Madrid 1886
- Estudios sobre la filosofía de Santo Tomás – volume 2, second edition, Madrid 1886
- Estudios sobre la filosofía de Santo Tomás – volume 3, second edition, Madrid 1887
- Philosophia elementaria – volume 1: Logicam, psychologiam, idealogiam complectens, seventh edition, Madrid 1894
- Philosophia elementaria – volume 2: Metaphysicam generalem atque specialem complectens, seventh edition, Madrid 1894
- Philosophia elementaria – volume 3: Ethicam et historiam philosophiae complectens, seventh edition, Madrid 1894

== Sources ==
- Acta Cap. Ord. Praed. (Rome, 1885);
- Hugo von Hurter, Nomenclator literarius, III (Innsbruck, 1895), 1499;
- Vigil, La orden de praedicatores (Madrid, 1884), 297.
