= List of Catholic dioceses in Morocco, Mauritania and Western Sahara =

The Catholic Church in Morocco, Mauritania and Western Sahara (which is occupied and claimed by Morocco; all three share a Franco-Spanish colonial past) is composed only of a Latin hierarchy (no Eastern Catholic), without a single ecclesiastical province, as all are exempt, i.e. directly dependent on the Holy See, comprising:

- two non-metropolitan archbishoprics, both in Morocco;
- a bishopric for all Mauritania; and
- an apostolic prefecture for all Western Sahara.

Neither country has its own episcopal conference either, but

- Morocco and Western Sahara are covered by the Regional Episcopal Conference of North Africa, with seat in Rabat (Morocco), which also includes states Algeria (Ecclesiastical Province of Alger), Libya and Tunisia (both entirely exempt), hence covering the Great Maghreb (western region of the Arab world) except Mauritania.
- Mauritania is covered by the Episcopal Conference of Senegal, Mauritania, Cape Verde and Guinea-Bissau, with seat in Dakar (Senegal).

There is an Apostolic Nunciature (embassy level) to Morocco (in national capital Rabat) and an Apostolic Delegation (lower level) to Mauritania (actually vested in the Apostolic Nunciature to Senegal, in its capital Dakar) as papal diplomatic representations, none for Western Sahara.

== Current (Latin) dioceses ==
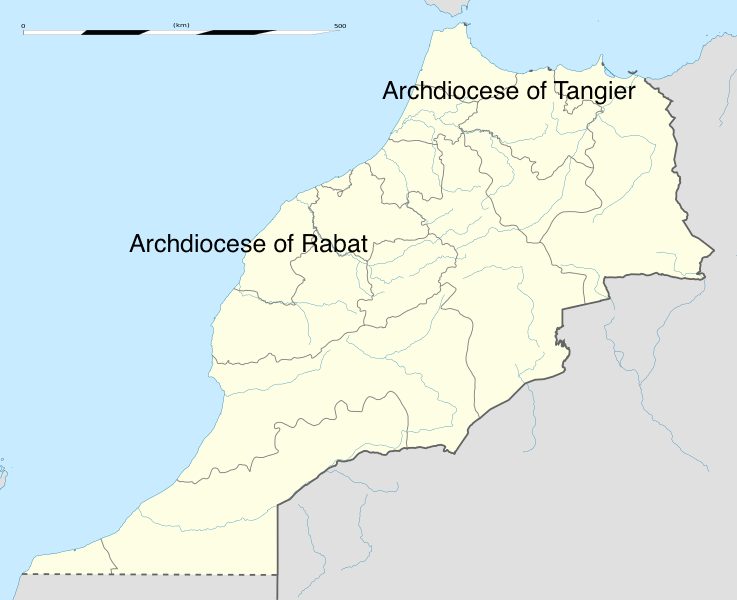
Map of the two archdioceses in Morocco

=== (Regional Episcopal Conference of North Africa) ===
==== Morocco ====
(both exempt, not Metropolitan)

- Archdiocese of Rabat
- Archdiocese of Tanger

==== Mauritania ====
- Diocese of Nouakchott, exempt, for the whole country

=== (Regional Episcopal Conference of Senegal, Mauritania, Cape Verde and Guinea-Bissau) ===
==== Western Sahara ====
- Apostolic Prefecture of Western Sahara, exempt, for the whole country

== Defunct sees ==
Only Morocco has two titular bishoprics, both of the episcopal (lowest) rank, being former suffragan sees, but both were suppressed as titular sees as well.

- Fez
- Marocco (now Marrakech)

All other defunct jurisdictions have current successor sees.

== See also ==
- Roman Catholic Diocese of Ceuta, in a Spanish enclave in Morocco

== Sources and external links ==
- GCatholic.org - Morocco
- GCatholic.org - Mauritania
- GCatholic.org - Western Sahara
- GCatholic.org - CERNA
- Catholic-Hierarchy entry.
