= Francisco de Jaén =

Most Reverend Francisco de Jaén
- Titular Bishop of Christopolis; Auxiliary Bishop of Seville
- Church: Catholic Church
- Archdiocese: Archdiocese of Seville
- In office: 1530–?

Orders
- Consecration: 12 May 1532 by Gabriele Mascioli Foschi

Francisco de Jaén, O.S.Io.Hieros. or Francisco de Ilhaen was a Roman Catholic prelate who served as Auxiliary Bishop of Seville (1530–?).

== Biography ==
Francisco de Jaén was ordained a priest in the Order of the Knights of Saint John of Jerusalem. On 5 Dec 1530, he was appointed during the papacy of Pope Clement VII as Auxiliary Bishop of Seville and Titular Bishop of Christopolis. On 12 May 1532, he was consecrated bishop by Gabriele Mascioli Foschi, Archbishop of Durrës.

== External links and additional sources ==
- Cheney, David M. "Archdiocese of Sevilla {Seville}". Catholic-Hierarchy.org. (for Chronology of Bishops) ^{[self-published]}
- Chow, Gabriel. "Metropolitan Archdiocese of Sevilla (Italy)". GCatholic.org. (for Chronology of Bishops) ^{[self-published]}
