= Sebastián Obregón =

Most Reverend Sebastián Obregón
- Titular Bishop of Marocco o Marruecos; Auxiliary Bishop of Seville
- Church: Catholic Church
- Archdiocese: Archdiocese of Seville
- In office: 1534–1559

Orders
- Consecration: 1535 by Alonso Manrique de Lara y Solís

Personal details
- Died: 8 January 1559 Seville, Spain

Sebastián Obregón (died 8 January 1559) was a Roman Catholic prelate who served as Auxiliary Bishop of Seville (1534–1559).

== Biography ==
Obregón was ordained a priest in the Order of Saint Benedict. On 2 December 1534, he was appointed during the papacy of Pope Paul III as Auxiliary Bishop of Seville and Titular Bishop of Marocco o Marruecos. In 1535, he was consecrated bishop by Alonso Manrique de Lara y Solís, Archbishop of Seville. He served as Auxiliary Bishop of Seville until his death on 8 January 1559.

== External links and additional sources ==
- Cheney, David M. "Archdiocese of Sevilla {Seville}". Catholic-Hierarchy.org. (for Chronology of Bishops) ^{[self-published]}
- Chow, Gabriel. "Metropolitan Archdiocese of Sevilla (Italy)". GCatholic.org. (for Chronology of Bishops) ^{[self-published]}
