= Francisco Domonte =

Roman Catholic prelate

Most Reverend Francisco Domonte
- Titular Bishop of Hippos; Auxiliary Bishop of Seville
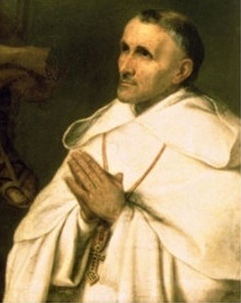
- Church: Catholic Church
- Archdiocese: Archdiocese of Seville
- In office: 1680–1681

Orders
- Consecration: 2 Jun 1680 by Ambrosio Ignacio Spínola y Guzmán

Personal details
- Born: 1618 Seville, Spain
- Died: 1681 (age 63) Seville, Spain

Francisco Domonte, O. de M. (1618–1681) was a Roman Catholic prelate who served as Auxiliary Bishop of Seville (1680–1681).

== Biography ==
Francisco Domonte was born in Seville, Spain and ordained a priest in the Order of the Blessed Virgin Mary of Mercy. On 11 Mar 1680, he was appointed during the papacy of Pope Innocent XI as Auxiliary Bishop of Seville and Titular Bishop of Hippos. On 2 Jun 1680, he was consecrated bishop by Ambrosio Ignacio Spínola y Guzmán, Archbishop of Seville with James Lynch, Archbishop of Tuam, serving as co-consecrator. He served as Auxiliary Bishop of Seville until his death in 1681.

While bishop, he was the principal co-consecrator of Antonio de Vergara, Archbishop of Sassari (1680) and Juan Grande Santos de San Pedro, Bishop of Almeria (1681).

== See also ==
- Catholic Church in Spain

== External links and additional sources ==
- Cheney, David M. "Archdiocese of Sevilla {Seville}". Catholic-Hierarchy.org. (for Chronology of Bishops) ^{[self-published]}
- Chow, Gabriel. "Metropolitan Archdiocese of Sevilla (Italy)". GCatholic.org. (for Chronology of Bishops) ^{[self-published]}
- Cheney, David M. "Hippos (Titular See)". Catholic-Hierarchy.org. (for Chronology of Bishops) ^{[self-published]}
- Chow, Gabriel. "Titular Episcopal See of Hippo Regius (Algeria)". GCatholic.org. (for Chronology of Bishops) ^{[self-published]}

Catholic Church titles
Preceded by Denis Hurault	Titular Bishop of Hippos; 1680–1681	Succeeded by Franciszek Ignacy Wysocki
Preceded by	Auxiliary Bishop of Seville; 1680–1681	Succeeded by
