= Benito Sanz y Forés =

His Eminence Benito Sanz y Forés
- Archbishop of Seville
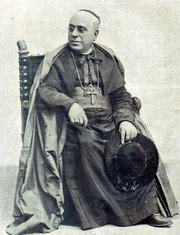
- Church: Roman Catholic Church
- Archdiocese: Seville
- See: Seville
- Appointed: 30 December 1889
- Term ended: 1 November 1895
- Predecessor: Zeferino González y Díaz Tuñón
- Successor: Marcelo Spínola y Maestre
- Other post: Cardinal-Priest of Sant'Eusebio (1893-95)
- Previous posts: Bishop of Oviedo (1868-81); Archbishop of Valladolid (1881-89)

Orders
- Ordination: 27 March 1852 by Pablo García y Abella
- Consecration: 8 November 1868 by Alessandro Franchi
- Created cardinal: 16 January 1893 by Pope Leo XIII
- Rank: Cardinal-Priest

Personal details
- Born: Benito Sanz y Forés; 21 March 1828 Gandía, Safor, Valencia, Kingdom of Spain
- Died: 1 November 1895 (aged 67) Madrid, Spanish Kingdom
- Buried: Seville Cathedral
- Parents: Andrés Sanz y López; Josefa Forés y Blanquer
- Education: University of Valencia
- Motto: Dominus illuminatio mea et salus mea ("The Lord is my light and my salvation")

Benito Sanz y Forés J.C.D. S.T.D. (21 March 1828 – 1 November 1895) was a Cardinal of the Roman Catholic Church and Archbishop of Seville.

Benito Sanz was born in Gandía, Valencia Province. He was educated at the University of Valencia where he studied philosophy and law, obtaining a bachelor's degree in law in 1848; he continued his studies at the Seminary of Valencia where he received a doctorate in canon law in 1853 and in a doctorate in theology in 1857.

== Priesthood ==
He was ordained on March 27, 1852 in Valencia. He worked in the Archdiocese of Valencia as a professor of canon law in its seminary from 1851–1857 and as canon magistral and vicar general. He also worked as an abbreviator in the nunciature in Spain, Madrid and served as a preacher in the Royal Court in 1864 as well as an auditor of the Sacred Rota in Madrid in 1866.

== Episcopate ==
He was appointed Bishop of Oviedo by Pope Pius IX on June 22, 1868. He attended the First Vatican Council in Rome from 1869–1870. He was promoted to the metropolitan see of Valladolid on November 18, 1881 and transferred to the metropolitan see of Seville on December 30, 1889.

== Cardinalate ==
He was created Cardinal-Priest of Sant'Eusebio by Pope Leo XIII in the consistory of January 16, 1893. He died in Madrid two years later and was buried in the metropolitan cathedral of Seville.

== Holy Cave of Covadonga ==
In 1872 he travelled to the Holy Cave of Covadonga and promoted its renovation; in 1874 he laid the first stone of the chapel dedicated to the Virgin inside the Cave and opened the chapel to the worship of the faithful during the September festivals.

Catholic Church titles
Preceded by José Luis Montagut Rubio	Bishop of Oviedo; June 22, 1868–December 30, 1889	Succeeded by Sebastián Herrero Espinosa de los Monteros
Preceded by Fernando Blanco y Lorenzo	Archbishop of Valladolid; November 18, 1881–1 November 1895	Succeeded by Mariano Miguel Gómez Alguacil y Fernández
Preceded by Zeferino González y Díaz Tuñón	Archbishop of Seville; 30 December 1889–1 November 1895	Succeeded by Marcelo Spínola y Maestre
