= Diocese of Tiberias =

Roman Catholic titular see

The Diocese of Tiberias was a significant Latin Catholic bishopric in the Crusader state Principality of Galilee, a major direct vassal of the Latin Kingdom of Jerusalem, with see in Tiberias. It is now a titular see.

== History ==
The city of Tiberias in Galilee was important enough in the Roman province of Palestina Secunda to become a suffragan of its capital Scythopolis's metropolitan archbishop.

During the First Crusade, Tiberias was occupied by the crusaders soon after the capture of Jerusalem. In 1099, the original site of the city was abandoned, and settlement shifted north to the present location. Saint Peter's Church, originally built by the Crusaders, is still standing today, although the building has been altered and reconstructed over the years. Under the crusaders, Tiberias became of Latin suffragan see of their new Latin Archbishopric of Nazareth, which replaced Scythopolis.

== List of bishops ==
=== Resident bishops ===
This partial list of resident bishops is drawn from Bernard Hamilton (2016), The Latin Church in the Crusader States: The Secular Church, Routledge.

- Elias (fl. 1144)
- Gerald (fl. 1174–1178)
- Geoffrey (fl. 1241)
- Eustorgius (1259–1273)
- William I of Salonica (1273–1274)
- William II le Velus (1274–c. 1283)

=== Titular bishops ===
- Pietro Corsari (1397 – ?)
- João Manuel, Carmelites (O. Carm.) (1442.04.18 – 1444.07.20)
- Reginaldo Romero, Dominican Order (O.P.) (1488.03.17 – 1507)
- Pietro Giovanni de Melis (1517.04.20 – ?)
- Giovanni Vitellio, Theatines (C.R.) (1592.03.04 – 1594)
- Luis Cerqueira, Jesuits (S.J.) (1593.01.29 – 1598.02.18)
- Johann Anton Tritt von Wilderen (1619.09.09 – 1639.02.08)
- Clemente Confetto (1623.01.09 – 1630.01.08)
- Sigismund Graf Miutini von Spilenberg (1648.03.30 – 1653)
- Armand Gaston Maximilien de Rohan de Soubise (1701.04.18 – 1704.04.09)(later Cardinal*)
- Aleksandras Mikalojus Gorainis (Aleksander Mikołaj Horain) (1704.09.15 – 1711.12.23)
- Archbishop Daniel Joseph Mayer (1712.03.16 – 1732.05.07)
- Johann Moritz von Strachwitz (1761.04.06 – 1781.01.28)
- Erasmus Dionys Krieger (1781.09.17 – 1792.12.27)
- Leopold Maximilian Graf von Firmian (Frimian) (1797.07.24 – 1800.11.23) (later Archbishop)
- Francesco Maria Paolucci Mancinelli (1801.09.28 – 1808.01.11)
- Karol Perényl (1808.07.11 – 1819.03.15)
- Richard Kornelius Dammers (1824.05.03 – 1842.05.23)
- Rodolpho von Thysebaert (1842.05.23 – 1868.05.12)
- Alessandro Valsecchi (1869.06.25 – 1879.05.06)
- Martin Marty, Benedictine Order (O.S.B.) (1879.08.11 – 1889.11.12)
- Giuseppe Ceppetelli (1890.06.23 – 1899.07.24) (later Titular Latin Patriarch of Constantinople *)
- Luigi Spandre (1899.09.03 – 1909.06.12)
- Bernardino Shlaku, Friars Minor (O.F.M.) (1910.01.08 – 1911.01.31)
- Charles Maurice Graham (1911.03.16 – 1912.09.02)
- Giacomo Sinibaldi (1913.05.15 – 1928.08.19)
- Paolino Ladeuze (1928.10.21 – 1940.01.29)
- Egidio Luigi Lanzo, Capuchin Franciscans (O.F.M. Cap.) (1940.08.09 – 1943.01.22)
- Giuseppe Della Cioppa (1943.07.17 – 1947.12.02)
- Raffaele Macario (1948.06.21 – 1966.11.29)

== See also ==
- Catholic Church in Israel
- Principality of Tiberias
