= Diocese of Morocco =

Roman Catholic titular see

The Diocese of Morocco (or Marrakesh, Spanish Marruecos) was a diocese of the Roman Catholic Church. It is presently a Latin Catholic titular see, i.e. a former diocese that no longer functions.

== History ==
The diocese was established in 1226 on Moroccan territory split off from Metropolitan Archdiocese of Toledo, presumably its Metropolitan. In 1237? it gained territory from the suppressed Diocese of Fez.

On 4 April 1417 it lost territory to establish the Roman Catholic Diocese of Ceuta, in 1500 it was suppressed.

From its suppression as residential diocese in 1500, it remained a Latin titular bishopric, which has had the following incumbents, all of the lowest (Episcopal) rank, but remained vacant for over a century:

In 1469, a diocese again called Marocco (by now synonymous with Morocco) was established, with episcopal see in Tangiers, which after suppression, restoration as Apostolic Prefecture of Marocco (again alias Marruecos) and promotion to Apostolic Vicariate of Marocco became in 1956 the present, still exempt Roman Catholic Archdiocese of Tanger.

== List of bishops ==
=== Resident ===
- Domingo, OP (1225.10.27 – 1236), later bishop of Baeza
- Agnello (1237.06.12 – death ?), previously Bishop of Fez (1225 – 1237.06.12)
- Lope Fernández Daín, OFM (1246.10.18 – death 1260?)
- Rodrigo Gudal, OFM (1289.12.11 – death 1307?)
- Bernardo Murcia, OFM (1307.08.29 – ?)
- Alfonso Bonhomme, OP (1344.01.10 – death 1353?)
- Aymar de Aureliaco (1413.05.10 – 1421.03.21), afterward bishop of Ceuta (Spain) (1421.03.21 – 1443), Coadjutor: Bishop-elect Vicente Trilles, OFM (1490.12.20 – ?)

=== Titular ===
- Pedro Montemolín (1500–?)
- Martín Cabeza de Vaca, OP (1508.01.28 – 1534)
- Sebastián Obregón, OSB (1534.12.02 – 1559.01.08)
- Bishop-elect Sancho Díaz de Trujillo (1539.09.09 – ?)
- Juan Terés (1575.02.04 – 1579.05.22) (later Archbishop)
- Miguel Espinosa (1579.10.26 – 1601.10.07)
- Tomás Espinosa (1606.09.25 – 1631.06.16)
- Valerio Maccioni (1668.09.17 – 1676.09.05)
- Piotr Mieszkowski (1678.06.06 – ?)
- John Skarbek (later Archbishop) (1696.01.02 – 1713.01.30)
- Jan Franciszek Kurdwanowski, Jesuits (S.J.) (1713.05.22 – 1729.12.28)
- João de Silva Ferreira (1742.11.26 – 1775.01.19)
- John Geddes (1779.09.30 – 1799.02.11)
- Carolus von Aulock (1826.03.13 – 1830.05.03)
- Bishop-elect Maria Nicolaus Silvester Guillon (1832.12.17 – ?)
- Felicissimo Coccino, OFMCap (1855.12.18 – 1878.02.27)
- Louis-Callixte Lasserre, OFMCap (1881.03.15 – 1903.08.22)

== See also ==
- List of Catholic dioceses in Morocco, Mauretania and Western Sahara

== Sources and external links ==
- GCatholic, with incumbent biography links
