= Francisco Javier de Cienfuegos y Jovellanos =

- Archbishop of Seville
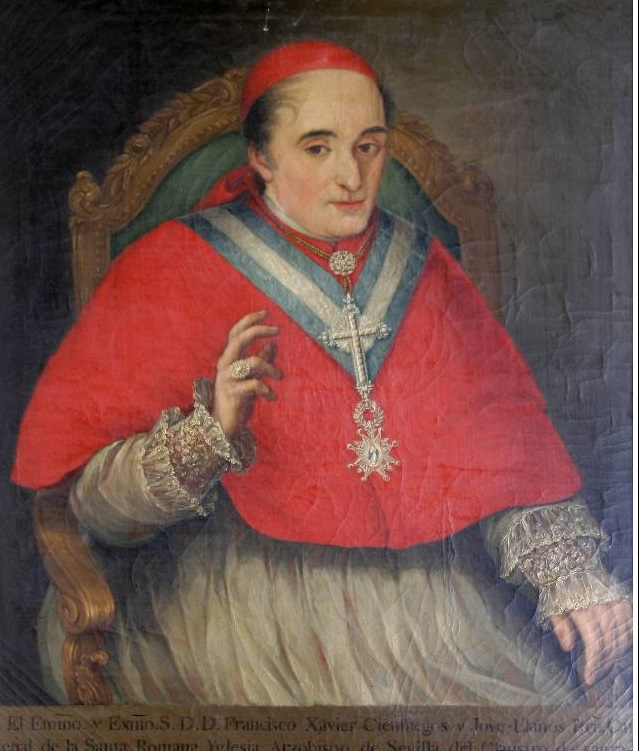
- Native name: Francisco Javier Cienfuegos Xovellanos
- Church: Catholic Church
- Archdiocese: Archdiocese of Seville
- In office: 20 December 1824 – 21 June 1847
- Predecessor: Romualdo Antonio Mon y Velarde
- Successor: Judas José Romo y Gamboa
- Other post: Cardinal-Priest of Santa Maria del Popolo (1831-1847)
- Previous post: Bishop of Cádiz (1819-1824)

Orders
- Consecration: 22 August 1819 by Romualdo Antonio Mon y Velarde
- Created cardinal: 13 March 1826 by Pope Pius IX

Personal details
- Born: 12 March 1766 Oviedo, Principality of Asturias, Kingdom of Spain
- Died: 21 June 1847 (aged 81)

Francisco Javier de Cienfuegos y Jovellanos (12 March 1766 – 1847) was a Spanish bishop and cardinal. He was born in Oviedo. He was bishop of Cádiz (1819–1824) and archbishop of Seville (1824–1847).

Catholic Church titles
Preceded by Juan Acisclo Vera Delgado	Bishop of Cadiz; 1819–1824	Succeeded by Domingo de Silos Moreno
Preceded by Romualdo Antonio Mon y Velarde	Archbishop of Seville; 1824–1847	Succeeded by Judas José Romo y Gamboa
