= José Antonio Peteiro Freire =

José Antonio Peteiro Freire O.F.M.
- Archbishop of Tangier
- Church: Catholic Church
- Archdiocese: Archdiocese of Tangier
- In office: 2 July 1983 – 23 March 2005
- Predecessor: Carlos Amigo Vallejo
- Successor: Santiago Agrelo

Orders
- Ordination: 17 March 1962
- Consecration: 24 September 1983 by Duraisamy Simon Lourdusamy

Personal details
- Born: 20 July 1936 Vilasantar, Province of A Coruña, Second Spanish Republic
- Died: 25 March 2010 (aged 73) Santiago de Compostela, Galicia, Spain
- Coat of arms

José Antonio Peteiro Freire (20 July 1936 – 25 March 2010) was a Spanish Roman Catholic prelate, who served as the third Archbishop of the Roman Catholic Archdiocese of Tanger from 2 July 1983 until his retirement on 23 March 2005. He was a member of the Franciscan order (O.F.M.)

Peteiro Freire died as the Archbishop Emeritus of Tanger in Santiago de Compostela, Spain, on 25 March 2010, at the age of 73. He was born in Vilasantar, Galicia.
