= Juan Riquelme (bishop) =

Most Reverend Juan Riquelme
- Titular Bishop of Utica; Auxiliary Bishop of Seville
- Church: Catholic Church
- Archdiocese: Archdiocese of Seville
- In office: 1668–1671

Personal details
- Born: 1616 Seville, Spain
- Died: 22 Feb 1671 (age 55) Seville, Spain

Juan Riquelme (1616 – 22 Feb 1671) was a Roman Catholic prelate who served as Auxiliary Bishop of Seville (1668–1671).

== Biography ==
Juan Riquelme was born in Seville, Spain. On 17 Sep 1668, he was appointed during the papacy of Pope Clement IX as Auxiliary Bishop of Seville and Titular Bishop of Utica. He served as Auxiliary Bishop of Seville until his death on 22 Feb 1671.

== External links and additional sources ==
- Cheney, David M. "Archdiocese of Sevilla {Seville}". Catholic-Hierarchy.org. (for Chronology of Bishops) ^{[self-published]}
- Chow, Gabriel. "Metropolitan Archdiocese of Sevilla (Italy)". GCatholic.org. (for Chronology of Bishops) ^{[self-published]}

Catholic Church titles
Preceded by Diego Gatica	Titular Bishop of Utica; 1668–1671	Succeeded by Melchior de Escuda Aybar
Preceded by	Auxiliary Bishop of Seville; 1668–1671	Succeeded by
