= Melchior de Escuda Aybar =

Spanish Roman Catholic prelate

Most Reverend Melchior de Escuda Aybar
- Titular Bishop of Utica; Auxiliary Bishop of Seville
- Church: Catholic Church
- Archdiocese: Archdiocese of Seville
- In office: 1671–1679

Orders
- Consecration: 1671 by Ambrosio Ignacio Spínola y Guzmán

Personal details
- Born: 1631 Seville, Spain
- Died: 26 March 1679 (age 48) Seville, Spain

Melchior de Escuda Aybar (1631 – 26 March 1679) was a Roman Catholic prelate who served as Auxiliary Bishop of Seville (1671–1679).

== Biography ==
Melchior de Escuda Aybar was born in Seville, Spain. On 24 August 1671, he was appointed during the papacy of Pope Clement X as Auxiliary Bishop of Seville and Titular Bishop of Utica. In 1671, he was consecrated bishop by Ambrosio Ignacio Spínola y Guzmán, Archbishop of Seville, with Alfonso Vázquez de Toledo, Bishop of Cádiz, and James Lynch, Archbishop of Tuam, serving as co-consecrators. He served as Auxiliary Bishop of Seville until his death on 26 March 1679.

While bishop, he was the principal co-consecrator of Alonso Antonio de San Martín, Bishop of Oviedo (1676).

== External links and additional sources ==
- Cheney, David M. "Archdiocese of Sevilla {Seville}". Catholic-Hierarchy.org. (for Chronology of Bishops) ^{[self-published]}
- Chow, Gabriel. "Metropolitan Archdiocese of Sevilla (Italy)". GCatholic.org. (for Chronology of Bishops) ^{[self-published]}

Catholic Church titles
Preceded by Juan Riquelme	Titular Bishop of Utica; 1671–1679	Succeeded by Johann Daniel von Gudenus
Preceded by	Auxiliary Bishop of Seville; 1671–1679	Succeeded by
