= Sebastián de Perea =

Most Reverend Sebastián de Perea
- Auxiliary Bishop of Seville
- Church: Catholic Church
- Archdiocese: Archdiocese of Seville
- In office: 1587–1607

Personal details
- Died: 20 September 1607 Seville, Spain

Sebastián de Perea or Sebastián de Pesca (died 20 September 1607) was a Roman Catholic prelate who served as Auxiliary Bishop of Seville (1587–1607).

On 27 April 1587, Sebastián de Perea was appointed by Pope Sixtus V as Auxiliary Bishop of Seville and Titular Bishop of Medaurus. He served as Auxiliary Bishop of Seville until his death on 20 Sep 1607.

== External links and additional sources ==
- Cheney, David M. "Archdiocese of Sevilla {Seville}". Catholic-Hierarchy.org. (for Chronology of Bishops) ^{[self-published]}
- Chow, Gabriel. "Metropolitan Archdiocese of Sevilla (Italy)". GCatholic.org. (for Chronology of Bishops) ^{[self-published]}
