= Pedro Montemolín =

Roman Catholic prelate - Auxiliary Bishop of Osma (1487-1500) and Seville (1500-Unknown)

Most Reverend Pedro Montemolín
- Titular Bishop of Marocco o Marruecos; Auxiliary Bishop of Seville
- Church: Catholic Church
- Archdiocese: Archdiocese of Seville
- In office: 1500–?
- Previous post: Auxiliary Bishop of Osma (1487-1500)

Pedro Montemolín was a Roman Catholic prelate who served as Auxiliary Bishop of Osma (1487-1500) and Auxiliary Bishop of Seville from 1500 until an unknown date.

== Biography ==
On 17 Dec 1487, Pedro Montemolín was appointed during the papacy of Pope Innocent VIII as Titular Bishop of Marocco o Marruecos and Auxiliary Bishop of Osma. In 1500, he was appointed during the papacy of Pope Alexander VI as Auxiliary Bishop of Seville.

== External links and additional sources ==
- Cheney, David M. "Archdiocese of Sevilla {Seville}". Catholic-Hierarchy.org. (for Chronology of Bishops) ^{[self-published]}
- Chow, Gabriel. "Metropolitan Archdiocese of Sevilla (Italy)". GCatholic.org. (for Chronology of Bishops) ^{[self-published]}

Catholic Church titles
Preceded by	Titular Bishop of Marocco o Marruecos; 1487–?	Succeeded by Vicente Trilles
Preceded by	Auxiliary Bishop of Osma; 1487-1500	Succeeded by
Preceded by	Auxiliary Bishop of Seville; 1500–?	Succeeded by
