= Carlos Amigo Vallejo =

Catholic cardinal (1934–2022)

His Eminence Carlos Amigo Vallejo O.F.M
- Cardinal; Archbishop of Seville
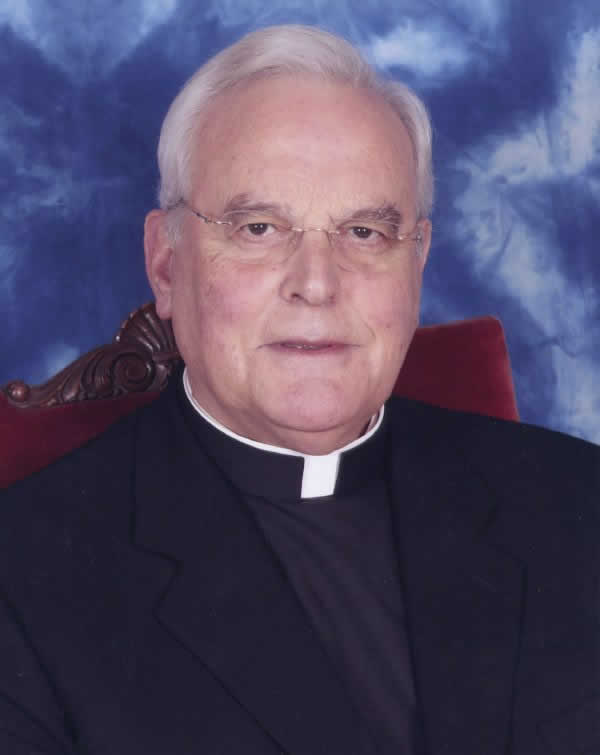
- Church: Roman Catholic Church
- Archdiocese: Seville
- See: Seville
- Appointed: 22 May 1982
- Installed: 29 June 1982
- Term ended: 5 November 2009
- Predecessor: José María Bueno y Monreal
- Successor: Juan José Asenjo Pelegrina
- Other post: Cardinal-Priest of Santa Maria in Monserrato degli Spagnoli (2003–2022)
- Previous post: Archbishop of Tanger (1973–82)

Orders
- Ordination: 17 August 1960 by Miguel Nóvoa Fuente
- Consecration: 28 April 1974 by Marcelo González Martín
- Created cardinal: 21 October 2003 by Pope John Paul II
- Rank: Cardinal-Priest

Personal details
- Born: Carlos Amigo Vallejo; 23 August 1934 Medina de Rioseco, Spain
- Died: 27 April 2022 (aged 87) Guadalajara, Spain
- Denomination: Catholic (Roman Rite)
- Coat of arms

Carlos Amigo Vallejo, O.F.M. (23 August 1934 – 27 April 2022) was a Spanish prelate of the Catholic Church who served as Archbishop of Seville from 1982 to 2009. He was made a cardinal in 2003. He was archbishop of Tangier in Morocco from 1973 to 1982.

== Biography ==
Born in Medina de Rioseco, Valladolid Province, Amigo Vallejo studied medicine in Valladolid before joining the Franciscan order, later studying philosophy in Rome and psychology in Madrid. He was ordained a priest in 1960.

He became Archbishop of Tanger in Morocco in 1973 and then became Archbishop of Seville on 22 May 1982. Instead of going to Rome to receive his pallium from Pope John Paul II, he received the pallium from Antonio Innocenti, Apostolic Nuncio to Spain, on 29 June 1982 during his installation mass at the metropolitan cathedral of Seville.

He was decorated with the Orden al Mérito de los Padres de la Patria Dominicana, the highest decoration granted by the Dominican Republic in February 1995.

Pope John Paul made him Cardinal-Priest of Santa Maria in Monserrato degli Spagnoli in the consistory of 21 October 2003.

He participated in the Papal conclave in 2005, which elected Cardinal Joseph Ratzinger as Pope Benedict XVI.

On 5 November 2009, Pope Benedict XVI accepted his resignation as Archbishop of Seville.

On 22 September 2012, Amigo Vallejo was appointed by Pope Benedict XVI to serve as his Special Envoy to the closing celebrations of the fifth centenary of the arrival of Puerto Rico's first Bishop, Don Alonso Manso, set to take place in San Juan, Puerto Rico, on 19 November 2012.

He participated as a cardinal elector in the papal conclave in 2013 which elected Cardinal Jorge Bergoglio as Pope Francis.

Amigo Vallejo died on 27 April 2022 from heart failure following lung surgery.

Catholic Church titles
Preceded by Francisco Aldegunde Dorrego	Archbishop of Tánger; 17 December 1973 – 22 May 1982	Succeeded by José Antonio Peteiro Freire
Preceded by José Maria Bueno y Monreal	Archbishop of Seville; 22 May 1982 – 5 November 2009	Succeeded by Juan Asenjo Pelegrina
Titular church created	Cardinal-Priest of Santa Maria in Monserrato degli Spagnoli; 21 October 2003 – 27 April 2022	Succeeded by José Cobo Cano
