= Marcelo Spínola y Maestre =

His Eminence Blessed Marcelo Spínola y Maestre
- Archbishop of Seville
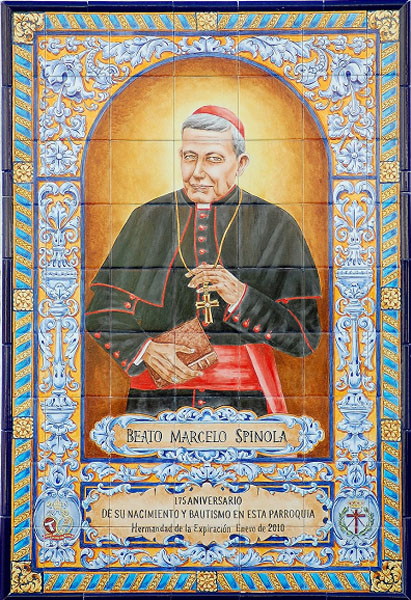
- Mural.
- Archdiocese: Seville
- Metropolis: Seville
- See: Seville
- Appointed: 2 December 1895
- Installed: 1896
- Term ended: 19 January 1906
- Predecessor: Benito Sanz y Forés
- Successor: Salvador Castellote y Pinazo
- Previous posts: Auxiliary Bishop of Seville (1880-1884); Titular Bishop of Milo (1880-1884); Bishop of Coria (1884-1886); Bishop of Málaga (1886-1895)

Orders
- Ordination: 21 March 1864 by Luis de la Lastra y Cuesta
- Consecration: 6 February 1881 by Joaquín Lluch y Garriga
- Created cardinal: 11 December 1905 by Pope Pius X
- Rank: Cardinal-Priest (no title assigned)

Personal details
- Born: Marcelo Rafael José María de los Dolores Hilario Spínola y Maestre; 14 January 1835 San Fernando, Cádiz Province, Spain
- Died: 20 January 1906 (aged 71) Seville, Spain
- Motto: Omni possum in eo ("All I can do")
- Coat of arms

Sainthood
- Feast day: 19 January
- Venerated in: Roman Catholic Church
- Title as Saint: Blessed
- Beatified: 29 March 1987; Saint Peter's Square, Vatican City by Pope John Paul II
- Attributes: Cardinal's attire; Crucifix
- Patronage: Archdiocese of Seville; Handmaids of the Divine Heart

Styles of Marcelo Spínola y Maestre
- Reference style: His Eminence
- Spoken style: Your Eminence
- Informal style: Cardinal
- See: Seville

Marcelo Rafael José María de los Dolores Hilario Spínola y Maestre (14 January 1835 - 19 January 1906) was a Cardinal of the Roman Catholic Church who served as the Archbishop of Seville. He established the Handmaids of the Divine Heart.

He was beatified in 1987 and his canonization cause is still pending.

== Biography ==
=== Early life and education ===
Marcelo Spínola was born on the island of San Fernando in Cádiz Province on 14 January 1835 at 6:00am.

His parents were Juan Spínola y Osorno, Marquis of Spínola and Antonia Maestre y Osorno; they had eight children, of whom four died in infancy. He was baptized the following day in the military parish of San Fernando by the military chaplain of the second battalion of the Real Cuerpo de Artillería de la Marina. His last name is also listed as Espínola.

He did his initial studies in the school of San Fernando, directed by priests from 1843 to 1845; then at the Colegio Santo Tomás in Cádiz, 1845-1846 where he studied Latin, Spanish and French grammar and basic philosophy. He then went to the school of Motril, where his father had been transferred from 1846 to 1847. He went on to the school in Granada, 1847–1848, where he studied physics, chemistry and natural history. He then went to the University of Valencia from 1849 to 1852 and the University of Seville, graduating on the 29 June 1856.

He opened a law office in Huelva, offering free services to the poor. He moved to Sanlúcar de Barrameda when his father was transferred to that city as chief of the port. He decided to follow his sacerdotal vocation on the advice of Canon Diego Herrero y Espinosa de los Monteros and began to study theology at home. He received the ecclesiastical tonsure on 29 May 1863 and the diaconate on 20 February 1864.

=== Priesthood and Episcopate ===
He was ordained on 21 March 1864. He did pastoral work in the archdiocese of Seville from 1864 in various parishes until 1880.

He was appointed titular bishop of Milos and auxiliary bishop of Seville by Pope Leo XIII on 16 December 1880. He was transferred to the diocese of Coria on 10 November 1884, and to the diocese of Málaga on 10 June 1886. He was promoted to the metropolitan see of Seville on 2 December 1895. He served as a Senator of the Spanish Kingdom from 1891 to 1894, and from 1898 until his death.

== Cardinalate and death ==
He was created a cardinal by Pope Pius X in the consistory of 11 December 1905. He was made a Cardinal-Priest but with no title assigned to him.

Spínola died at noon on 20 January 1906 in Seville. On 24 January 1913, his remains were transferred to a new mausoleum built in the chapel of Dolores in the same cathedral.

== Beatification ==
Spínola's spiritual writings were approved by theologians on 23 March 1945. The cause of beatification commenced on 19 February 1956 under Pope Pius XII and began on a diocesan level in the Archdiocese of Seville. The Positio - which documented his life of heroic virtue - was submitted to the Congregation for the Causes of Saints in 1978. This culminated with the decree of heroic virtue on 24 September 1983 in which Pope John Paul II bestowed upon him the title of Venerable.

A miracle attributed to his intercession was investigated and ratified in 1985 with documentation sent to Rome. John Paul II confirmed the miracle on 10 November 1986 and it led to his beatification on 29 March 1987.

Another miracle was then under investigation in Jaén on a diocesan level from 11 April 2011 to 7 April 2013. The documentation must be submitted to Rome and approved prior to canonization.

Catholic Church titles
Preceded by Benito Sanz y Forés	Archbishop of Seville; 2 December 1895–20 January 1906	Succeeded by Salvador Castellote y Pinazo
