= Juan Laso de la Vega =

Most Reverend Juan Laso de la Vega
- Titular Bishop of Philadelphia in Arabi; Auxiliary Bishop of Seville
- Church: Catholic Church
- Archdiocese: Archdiocese of Seville
- In office: 1506–1516

Orders
- Consecration: 1506

Personal details
- Died: Dec 1516 Seville, Spain

Juan Laso de la Vega (died December 1516) was a Roman Catholic prelate who served as Auxiliary Bishop of Seville (1506–1516).

== Biography ==
Juan Laso de la Vega was ordained a priest in the Order of Saint Augustine. In 1506, he was appointed during the papacy of Pope Julius II as Auxiliary Bishop of Seville and Titular Bishop of Philadelphia in Arabia. He was consecrated bishop in the same year. He served as Auxiliary Bishop of Seville until his death in Dec 1516.

== External links and additional sources ==
- Cheney, David M. "Archdiocese of Sevilla {Seville}". Catholic-Hierarchy.org. (for Chronology of Bishops) ^{[self-published]}
- Chow, Gabriel. "Metropolitan Archdiocese of Sevilla (Italy)". GCatholic.org. (for Chronology of Bishops) ^{[self-published]}

Catholic Church titles
Preceded by Guillaume de Gabarrario	Titular Bishop of Philadelphia in Arabia; 1506–1516	Succeeded by Raymond de Fabro
Preceded by	Auxiliary Bishop of Seville; 1506–1516	Succeeded by
