= Gaspar de Torres =

Most Reverend Gaspar de Torres
- Titular Bishop of Medaurus; Auxiliary Bishop of Seville
- Church: Catholic Church
- Archdiocese: Archdiocese of Seville
- In office: 1570–1584

Personal details
- Born: 1510 Torres, Spain
- Died: 5 Jan 1584 (age 74) Seville, Spain

Gaspar de Torres (1510 – 5 Jan 1584) was a Roman Catholic prelate who served as Auxiliary Bishop of Seville (1570–1584).

== Biography ==
Gaspar de Torres was born in Torres, Spain in 1510 and ordained a priest in the Order of the Blessed Virgin Mary of Mercy. On 9 Jun 1570, he was appointed during the papacy of Pope Pius V as Auxiliary Bishop of Seville and Titular Bishop of Medaurus. He served as Auxiliary Bishop of Seville until his death on 5 Jan 1584.

== External links and additional sources ==
- Cheney, David M. "Madaurus (Titular See)". Catholic-Hierarchy.org. (for Chronology of Bishops) ^{[self-published]}
- Chow, Gabriel. "Titular Episcopal See of Madaurus (Algeria)". GCatholic.org. (for Chronology of Bishops) ^{[self-published]}
- Cheney, David M. "Archdiocese of Sevilla {Seville}". Catholic-Hierarchy.org. (for Chronology of Bishops) ^{[self-published]}
- Chow, Gabriel. "Metropolitan Archdiocese of Sevilla (Italy)". GCatholic.org. (for Chronology of Bishops) ^{[self-published]}
