= Archdiocese of Tangier =

Catholic archdiocese in Morocco

Coordinates: 35.7667°N 5.8000°W

Archdiocese of Tangier Archidioecesis Tingitanus Archidiocèse de Tanger
- The cathedral in Tangier

Location
- Country: Morocco
- Territory: Tangier, northern Morocco

Statistics
- Population: Total; Catholics: (as of 2014); 4,175,000; 2,500 (.1%)

Information
- Denomination: Roman Catholic Church
- Rite: Roman
- Established: 14 November 1956
- Cathedral: Cathedral of the Immaculate Conception and the Holy Spirit

Current leadership
- Pope: Leo XIV
- Archbishop: Emilio Rocha Grande, OFM
- Bishops emeritus: Santiago Agrelo Martínez, OFM

Map

The Archdiocese of Tangier (Latin: Archidioecesis Tingitanus) is a Roman Catholic archdiocese in Morocco. Headquartered in Tangier, it is immediately subject to the Holy See.

== History ==
- 1469: Established as Diocese of Morocco from the Diocese of Ceuta in Portugal
- 1570: Suppressed (combined into the Diocese of Ceuta). Additional pre- and post-1662 data is available.
- 28 November 1630: Restored as Apostolic Prefecture of Morocco. Possibly suppressed in 1649. Additional pre- and post-1662 data is available.
- 14 April 1908: Promoted as Apostolic Vicariate of Morocco
- 14 November 1956: Promoted as Archdiocese of Tangier

== Ordinaries ==
1. Nuno Álvares de Aguiar, O.S.B. † ( 1469 – 15 Jul 1491)
2. Diogo Ortiz de Villegas ( 1491 – 3 May 1500)
3. João Lobo (4 May 1500 – 1508)
4. Nicolau Pedro Mendes (4 Mar 1523 – 1542)
5. Gonçalo Pinheiro (23 Nov 1542 – 27 Jun 1552 )
6. Francisco Quaresma, O.F.M. (15 Dec 1557 – 1585)
7. Diogo Correia de Sousa (15 Jul 1585 – 16 Feb 1598)
8. Heitor de Valadares (11 Mar 1598 – 1600)
9. Gerónimo de Gouveia, O.F.M. (24 Jan 1601 – 1602)
10. Agostinho Ribeiro (27 Aug 1603 – 29 Jul 1613)
11. António de Aguiar (21 Oct 1613 – 1632)
12. Gonçalo da Silva (6 Sep 1632 – 16 Feb 1649)

=== Vicars Apostolic of Morocco ===
1. Francisco María Cervera y Cervera, O.F.M. (8 Apr 1908 – 26 Mar 1926 )
2. José María Betanzos y Hormaechevarría, O.F.M. (17 Jul 1926 – 27 Dec 1948 )
3. Francisco Aldegunde Dorrego, O.F.M. (27 Dec 1948 – 14 Nov 1956 see below)

=== Archbishops of Tangier ===
1. Francisco Aldegunde Dorrego, O.F.M. (see above 14 Nov 1956 – 17 Dec 1973 )
2. Carlos Amigo Vallejo, O.F.M. (17 Dec 1973 – 22 May 1982 ), appointed Archbishop of Sevilla {Seville}, Spain (Cardinal in 2003)
3. José Antonio Peteiro Freire, O.F.M. (2 Jul 1983 – 23 Mar 2005 )
4. Santiago Agrelo Martínez, O.F.M. (11 Apr 2007 – 24 May 2019 )
5. Emilio Rocha Grande, O.F.M. (7 February 2023 – )

=== Archbishop emeritus ===
1. Santiago Agrelo Martínez, O.F.M.

== See also ==
- List of Roman Catholic dioceses in Morocco
- Archdiocese of Rabat
