= Archdiocese of Seville =

Roman Catholic archdiocese in Spain

Metropolitan Archdiocese of Seville Archidioecesis Metropolitae Hispalensis Archidiócesis Metropolitano de Sevilla

Catholic
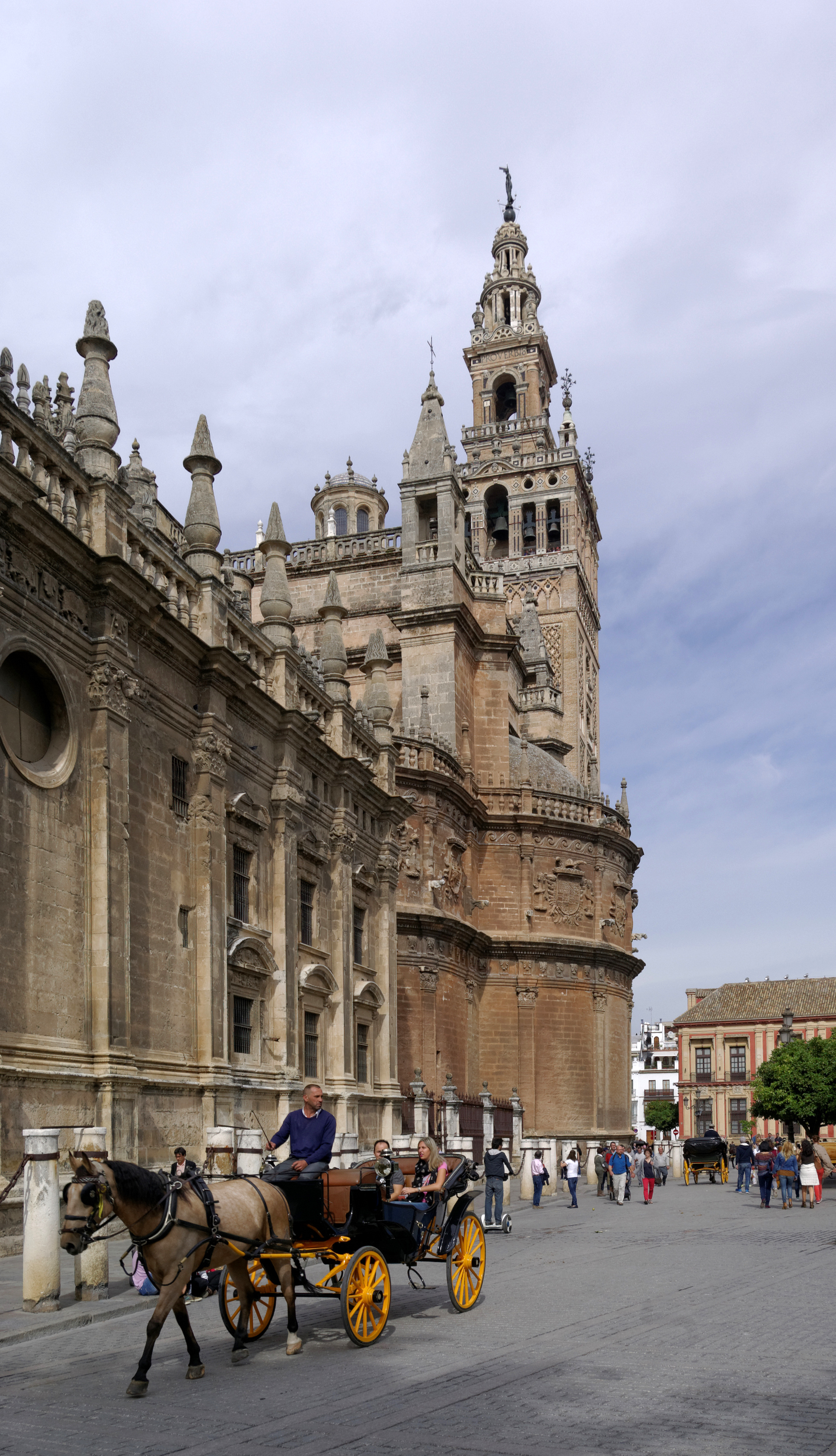
- Seville Cathedral

Location
- Country: Spain
- Ecclesiastical province: Seville

Statistics
- Area: 14,036 km^{2} (5,419 sq mi)
- Population: Total; Catholics: (as of 2010); 1,900,224; 1,890,000 (99.5%)

Information
- Denomination: Roman Catholic
- Sui iuris church: Latin Church
- Rite: Roman Rite
- Established: 3rd Century (As Diocese of Seville); 4th Century (As Archdiocese of Seville)
- Cathedral: Cathedral of St Mary in Seville

Current leadership
- Pope: Leo XIV
- Metropolitan Archbishop: José Ángel Saiz Meneses
- Suffragans: Diocese of Cádiz and Ceuta; Diocese of San Cristóbal de La Laguna; Diocese of Canarias; Diocese of Córdoba; Diocese of Huelva; Diocese of Jerez de la Frontera
- Bishops emeritus: Juan Asenjo Pelegrina

Map

Website
- Website of the Archdiocese

The Metropolitan Archdiocese of Seville (Latin: Archidioecesis Metropolitae Hispalensis) is a Latin Church archdiocese of the Catholic Church in Seville, Spain. The Diocese of Seville was founded in the 3rd century. It was raised to the level of an archdiocese in the 4th century. The current archbishop is José Ángel Saiz Meneses. It has the suffragan dioceses of:

- Cádiz y Ceuta
- Córdoba
- Huelva
- Canaries
- Jerez de la Frontera
- San Cristóbal de La Laguna o Tenerife

== Early history ==
During Roman times Seville was the capital of the Province of Baetica, and the origin of the diocese goes back to apostolic times, or at least to the 1st century. Saint Gerontius, Bishop of Italica, preached in Baetica, and without doubt must have left a pastor of its own to Seville. It is certain that in 303, when Saints Justa and Rufina were martyred for refusing to adore a pagan idol, there was a Bishop of Seville named Sabinus, who assisted at the Council of Illiberis in 287.

Zeno (472–486) was appointed vicar apostolic by Pope Simplicius, and Pope Hormisdas gave the same charge to Bishop Sallustius in the provinces of Baetica and Lusitania. However, the see was rendered illustrious above all by the holy brothers Saints Leander and Isidore. The former of these contributed to the conversion of Saint Hermengild and Recared, and presided at the Third Council of Toledo in 589. While the latter presided at the Fourth Council of Toledo and was the teacher of medieval Spain.

The king's son Philip was appointed Archbishop of Seville, while he was given as coadjutor the Dominican Raimundo de Losada, Bishop of Segovia, who became archbishop five years later, on the abdication of the Infante. In addition to the cathedral chapter, another community of clerics was formed to sing the Divine Office in the Chapel Royal of Our Lady of the Kings (Nuestra Senora de los Reyes) about 1252.

Most of the other mosques of the city were converted into churches, but Santa María la Blanca, Santa Cruz, and San Bartolome were left to the Jews for synagogues. The cathedral originated in the great mosque which was the work of the emirs who built the Aljama mosque, rebuilt in 1171 by the Almohad emir, Yusuf-ben Yacub. The famous tower called the Giralda is due to Almanzor. In order to secure the liturgical orientation, when the mosque was converted into a cathedral its width was made the length of the new church; and it was divided into two parts, the lesser part, on the cast, being separated from the rest by a balustrade and grating, to form the chapel royal.

== List of bishops and archbishops of Seville ==
=== Early bishops ===
- Marcellus (3rd century)
- Savinus I (287–c. 306)
- Savinus II ( –441)
- Epifanius (441–461)
- Savinus II (461)
- Oroncius (c. 462–c. 474)
- Zeno (c. 476–c. 486)
- Maximianus (c. 516)
- Salustius (c. 517–c. 519)
- Crispinus (c. 522)
- Laurian (-539; +546)
- Stephanus ( –578)
- Leander (579 – 13 March 600)
- Isidore of the Etymologies (13 March 600 – 4 April 636)
- Honoratus (636–641)
- Antonius (641–655)
- Fugitivus (656– )
- Julianus I ( –681)
- Floresindus (682–688)
- Felix (c. 688–c. 693)
- Faustinus (c. 693)
- Oppas (710–c. 711)
- John I (839–c. 850)
- Recafred (c. 850–c. 860)
- Philip of Castile (1251–1258)
- Ramon Losaza, O.P. (1259–1288 Died)

=== 1300 to 1500 ===
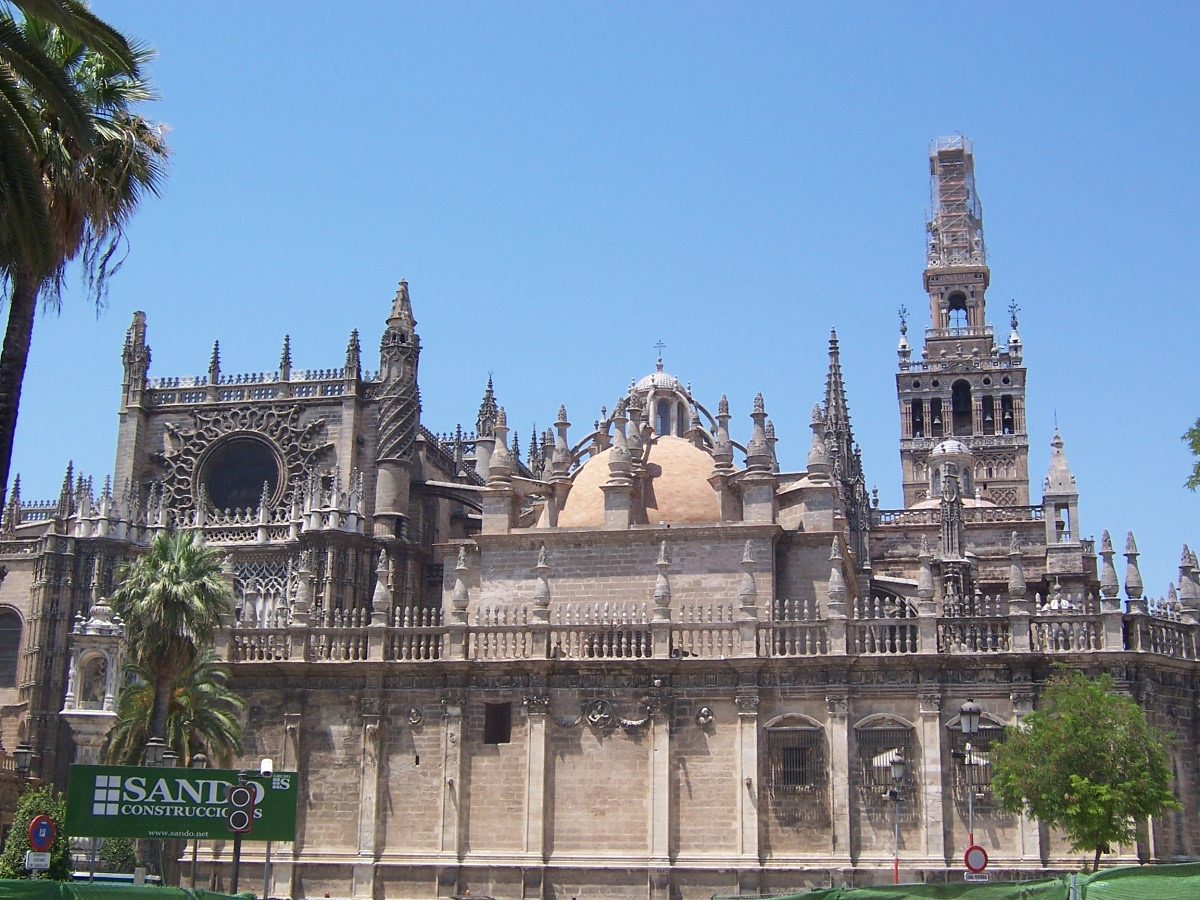

- Juan Almoravid (9 Jun 1300 Appointed – 1303 Died)
- Fernando Gutiérrez Tello (12 April 1304 – 23 April 1323) – led Castilian forces at the Siege of Gibraltar
- Juan Sánchez (April 1323 – after 23 November 1348)
- Nuño de Fuentes (1349–1361) – Convoked a provincial council in 1352.
- Alonso de Toledo y Vargas (13 October 1362 – 27 December 1366) – Formerly the bishop of Badajoz and Osmo.
- Pedro Gómez Álvarez de Albornoz (23 March 1369 – 1371) – Previously bishop of Sigüenza, Coimbra and Lisbon. Named Cardinal by Gregory XI in 1371 (First from Seville).
- Fernando Álvarez de Albornoz (9 Jun 1371 – 2 Jul 1374 Died)
- Pedro Gómez Barroso (1379–1390) – Formerly an abbot of Colegiata de Valladolid. Related to previous Archbishop.
- 1390–1393 seat vacant
- Gonzalo Mena Roelas (28 January 1393 – 21 April 1401) – Previously bishop of Calahorra y de Burgos, founded Monastery of Santa Maria de las Cuevas.
- Pedro de Luna y Albornoz (1401–1403)
- Alonso de Exea (1403–1417) – Formerly bishop of Ávila and Zamora. Named a Latin Patriarch of Constantinople.
- Diego de Anaya Maldonado (1418–1431) – Previously bishop of Tuy, Orense, Salamanca and Cuenca.
- Lope de Olmedo (1431–1433)
- Juan de Cerezuela y Urazandi (1433–1435) – Became Archbishop of Toledo in 1435.
- Diego de Anaya Maldonado (November 1435–26 September 1437) – Second time.
- Gutierre Álvarez de Toledo y Alba (1438–1442) – Lord of Alba de Tormes.
- García Enríquez Osorio (1442–1448) – Bishop of Oviedo.
- Juan de Cervantes (1448 – 9 November 1453) – Previously bishop of Ávila, Ostia and Segovia, participated in the Council of Florence. Whilst in Rome, his secretary would become the future pope. Named Cardinal by Pope Martin V.
- Alonso de Fonseca y Ulloa (1454–1465)
- Alonso de Fonseca y Acevedo (1465–1469)
- Alonso de Fonseca y Ulloa (1469–1473)
- Pietro Riario (1473–1474)
- Pedro González de Mendoza (1474–1482), El Gran Cardenal de España
- Iñigo Manrique de Lara (archbishop) (15 January 1483 – Apr 1485)
- Diego Hurtado de Mendoza y Quiñones (26 August 1485 – 14 October 1502)

=== 1500 to 1700 ===
- Juan de Zúñiga y Pimentel (5 May 1503 – 26 July 1504) (Cardinal in 1503)
- Diego de Deza (1504 – 9 June 1523)
- Gutierre Álvarez de Toledo (28 Aug 1506 Appointed – )
- Alfonso Manrique de Lara y Solís (31 Aug 1523 – 28 Sep 1538 Died) (Cardinal in 1532)
- (Cardinal) García de Loaysa y Mendoza (21 May 1539 – 22 April 1546)
- Fernando de Valdés y Salas (27 August 1546 – 9 December 1566)
- Gaspar de Zúñiga y Avellaneda (22 June 1569 – 2 January 1571) (Cardinal in 1570)
- Cristóbal Rojas Sandoval (18 May 1571 – 22 September 1580)
- Rodrigo de Castro Osorio (20 October 1581 – 20 September 1600) (Cardinal in 1585)
- (Cardinal) Fernando Niño de Guevara (30 April 1601 – 8 January 1609)
- Pedro Castro Quiñones (5 July 1610 – 20 December 1623)
- Luis Fernández de Córdoba (11 March 1624 – 26 June 1625)
- Diego Guzman de Haros (15 September 1625 – 21 January 1631) (Cardinal in pectore in 1629, published 1630)
- (Cardinal) Gaspar de Borja y Velasco (19 February 1632 – 16 January 1645), appointed Archbishop of Toledo
- (Cardinal) Agustin Spinola Basadone (16 January 1645 – 12 February 1649)
- Domingo Pimentel Zúñiga (19 Jul 1649 – 2 Dec 1652) (Cardinal in 1652)
- Pedro Tapia (23 September 1652 – 25 August 1657)
- Pedro Urbina Montoya (1 April 1658 – 6 February 1663)
- Antonio Paiño Sevilla (4 June 1663 – 25 May 1669)
- Ambrosio Ignacio Spínola y Guzmán (7 October 1668 – 24 May 1684)
- Jaime de Palafox y Cardona (13 Nov 1684 – 2 Dec 1701 Died)

=== 1700 to 1900 ===
- Manuel Arias y Porres (3 April 1702 – 16 November 1717) (Cardinal in pectore in 1712, published 1713)
- Felipe Antonio Gil Taboada (4 March 1720 – 29 April 1722)
- Luis de Salcedo y Azcona (7 October 1722 – 3 May 1739)
- (Cardinal) Luis Antonio Jaime de Borbón y Farnesio (19 Sep 1741 – 18 Dec 1754 Resigned)
- Francisco de Solís Folch de Cardona (17 November 1755 – 21 March 1776) (Cardinal in 1756)
- Francisco Javier Delgado y Venegas (20 May 1776 – 30 March 1778), appointed Patriarch of West Indies (Cardinal in 1778)
- Alonso Marcos de Llanes Argüelles (15 December 1783 – 7 January 1795)
- Antonio Despuig y Dameto (18 December 1795 – 30 January 1799) (elevated to Cardinal in 1803)
- Luis María de Borbón y Vallabriga, 14th Count of Chinchón (15 March 1799 – 22 December 1800) (Cardinal in 1800), appointed Archbishop of Toledo
- vacant
- Romualdo Antonio Mon y Velarde (23 September 1816 – 16 December 1819)
- Francisco Javier de Cienfuegos y Jovellanos (26 October 1824 – 21 June 1847) (Cardinal in 1826)
- Judas José Romo y Gamboa (17 December 1847 – 11 January 1855) (Cardinal in 1850)
- Manuel Joaquín Tarancón y Morón (3 August 1857 – 26 August 1862) (Cardinal in 1858)
- Luis de la Lastra y Cuesta (16 March 1863 – 5 May 1876) (Cardinal in 1867)
- Joaquín Lluch y Garriga (22 June 1877 – 28 September 1882) (Cardinal in 1882)
- Zeferino González y Díaz Tuñón (15 March 1883 – 27 March 1885), appointed Archbishop of Toledo; later returned here; future Cardinal
- Bienvenudo Monzon y Martin (27 March 1885 – 10 August 1885)
- Zeferino Gonzalez y Díaz Tunon (15 January 1886 – 28 November 1889) (Cardinal in 1887)
- Benito Sanz y Forés (30 December 1889 – 1 November 1895) (Cardinal in 1893)

=== 1900 to present ===
- Marcelo Spinola y Maestre (2 December 1895 – 20 January 1906) (Cardinal in 1905)
- Salvador Castellote y Pinazo (6 December 1906 – 23 December 1906)
- Enrique Almaraz y Santos (18 April 1907 – 16 December 1920) (Cardinal in 1912), appointed Archbishop of Toledo
- Eustaquio Ilundáin y Esteban (16 December 1920 – 10 August 1937) (Cardinal in 1925)
- Pedro Segura y Sáenz (14 September 1937 – 8 April 1957) (Cardinal in 1927 upon appointment as Archbishop of Toledo the same year)
- José Bueno y Monreal (8 April 1957 – 22 May 1982) (Cardinal in 1958)
- Carlos Amigo Vallejo (22 May 1982 – 5 November 2009) (Cardinal in 2003)
- Juan Asenjo Pelegrina (5 November 2009 – 17 April 2021)
- José Ángel Saiz Meneses (17 April 2021 – present)

== Auxiliary bishops ==
- Reginaldo Romero, O.P. (17 Mar 1488 to 1507), Died
- Pedro Montemolín (1500), Died
- Juan Laso de la Vega, O.S.A. (1506 to Dec 1516), Died
- Martín Cabeza de Vaca, O.P. (28 Jan 1508 to 1534), Died
- Francisco de Jaén (Ilhaen), O.S.Io.Hieros. (5 December 1530), Died
- Sebastián Obregón, O.S.B. (2 Dec 1534 to 8 Jan 1559), Died
- Gaspar de Torres, O. de M. (9 Jun 1570 to 5 Jan 1584), Died
- Sebastián de Perea (Pesca) (27 Apr 1587 to 20 Sep 1607), Died
- Michael Fitzwalter (1596–1601) also Appointed Bishop of Ardfert and Aghadoe but never installed
- Francisco de Vera-Villavicencio, O. de M. (4 Jul 1603 to 18 Mar 1613) Appointed Bishop of Perpignan-Elne
- Juan de la Sal (22 Oct 1603 to 14 Jan 1630), Died
- Lorenzo Monzonís Galatina, O.F.M. (1606 to 27 Jan 1610) Appointed, Archbishop of Lanciano
- Luis Camargo Pacheco (11 July 1622 – 29 March 1665), Died
- Alonso Godina (20 Aug 1629 – 28 Feb 1630), Died
- Juan Arroyo (bishop) (7 Dec 1654 to 16 Dec 1656), Died
- Juan Riquelme (bishop) (17 Sep 1668 to 22 Feb 1671)
- Melchior de Escuda Aybar (24 Aug 1671 to 26 Mar 1679), Died
- Francisco Domonte, O. de M. (11 Mar 1680 to 1681)
- Pedro Francisco Levanto Vivaldo (4 Jun 1703 to 8 Jul 1715), Died
- José Esquivel Castillejos, O.P. (1 Oct 1717 to 11 Jul 1738), Died
- Manuel Tercero Rozas, O.S.A. (26 Nov 1727 to 4 Jul 1752), Died
- Domingo Pérez Rivera (6 Mar 1741 to 12 Nov 1771), Died
- Francisco de Solís Folch de Cardona (20 Jan 1749 to 25 Sep 1752) Appointed Archbishop of Seville
- Agustín Ayestarán y Landa (7 Sep 1772 to 27 Jun 1796) Appointed Bishop of Córdoba
- Manuel Cayetano Muñoz Benavente (24 Jul 1797 to Apr 1814), Died
- Juan Acisclo de Vera y Delgado (20 Jul 1801 to 15 Mar 1815) Appointed, Archbishop (Personal Title) of Cádiz
- Miguel Fernández Flórez, O.F.M. (14 Apr 1817 to 14 Aug 1822), Died
- Vicente Román y Linares, O. Praem. (6 May 1826 to 29 Mar 1835), Died
- Calixto Castrillo y Ornedo (23 Dec 1861 to 1 Oct 1863) Appointed, Bishop of León
- Manuel María León González y Sánchez (28 Jan 1876 to 22 Jun 1877), Appointed Bishop of Jaén
- José María Cirarda Lachiondo (9 Apr 1960 to 22 Jul 1968) Appointed, Bishop of Santander
- Juan Antonio del Val Gallo (4 Apr 1969 to 3 Dec 1971) Appointed, Bishop of Santander
- Rafael Bellido Caro (29 Nov 1973 to 3 Mar 1980) Appointed, Bishop of Jerez de la Frontera
- Santiago Gómez Sierra (18 Dec 2010 to 15 Jun 2020) Appointed, Bishop of Huelva
