= Juan de la Sal =

Roman catholic prelate in Seville, Spain

Most Reverend Juan de la Sal
- Titular Bishop of Hippo Diarrhytus; Auxiliary Bishop of Seville
- Church: Catholic Church
- Archdiocese: Archdiocese of Seville
- In office: 1603–1630

Orders
- Consecration: 1603 by Fernando Niño de Guevara

Personal details
- Died: 14 January 1630 Seville, Spain

Juan de la Sal (died 14 January 1630) was a Roman Catholic prelate who served as Auxiliary Bishop of Seville (1603–1630) and Titular Bishop of Hippo Diarrhytus (1603–1630).

== Biography ==
On 22 October 1603, Juan de la Sal was appointed during the papacy of Pope Clement VIII as Auxiliary Bishop of Seville and Titular Bishop of Hippo Diarrhytus. In 1603, he was consecrated bishop by Fernando Niño de Guevara, Archbishop of Seville. He served as Auxiliary Bishop of Seville until his death on 14 January 1630.

While bishop, he was the principal co-consecrator of Arcangelo Gualtieri, Archbishop of Monreale (1612); Martín Fernández Portocarrero, Bishop of Ciudad Rodrigo (1624); and Fernando Andrade Sotomayor, Bishop of Palencia (1628).

== External links and additional sources ==
- Cheney, David M. "Archdiocese of Sevilla {Seville}". Catholic-Hierarchy.org. (for Chronology of Bishops) ^{[self-published]}
- Chow, Gabriel. "Metropolitan Archdiocese of Sevilla (Italy)". GCatholic.org. (for Chronology of Bishops) ^{[self-published]}
