= Diocese of Fez =

Former Catholic jurisdiction in North Africa

The Diocese of Fez was a short-lived (c. 1225 – 1237) was a Latin Church ecclesiastical jurisdiction or diocese of the Catholic Church in Fez, Morocco.

== History ==
The Diocese of Fez (Fes, Fecen(sis) or Fessen(sis)) was a Latin Church diocese established around 1225 in the territory of modern Morocco, without direct predecessor.

Its only resident incumbent Ordinary was :

- Bishop Agnello (1225 – 1237.06.12), later Bishop of Marocco (Marrakech) (1237.06.12 – ?)

Suppressed circa 1237, its territory being merged into the Diocese of Marocco (at Marrakech, also in present Morocco), to which its incumbent bishop Agnello was appointed.

== Titular see ==
Circa 1496 the diocese was nominally restored as a Latin titular see, though it was however again suppressed even as titular see in 1730, having had the following incumbents, all of the fitting episcopal rank:

- Teotónio de Bragança, Jesuits (S.J.) (1578.07.04 – 1578.12.07) as Coadjutor Archbishop of Évora (Portugal) (1578.06.28 – 1578.12.07); succeeded as Metropolitan Archbishop of Évora (1578.12.07 – death 1602.07.24)
- Jorge Queimado, Augustinians (O.E.S.A.) (1599.02.01 – ?death) as Auxiliary Bishop of Braga (Portugal) (1599.02.01 – ?)
- Manuel dos Anjos, Observant? Friars Minor (O.F.M. Obs.) (1621.11.15 – death 1634.10.28) as Auxiliary Bishop of above Évora (Portugal) (1621.11.15 – 1634.10.28)
- Gabriel ab Annuntiatione, Secular Canons of Saint John (C.R.S.J.E.) (1640.03.26 – death 1644.03.18) as Auxiliary Bishop of above Évora (Portugal) (1640.03.26 – 1644.03.18)
- Stanislaus Giannotti, Canons Regular of Saint Augustine (C.R.S.A.) (1659.12.01 – death 1681) as Auxiliary Bishop of then Archdiocese of Kyiv–Černihiv (now Kyïv–Žytomyr, Ukraine) (1659.12.01 – 1681)

== See also ==
- List of Catholic dioceses in Morocco, Mauretania and Western Sahara

== Sources and external links ==
- GCatholic
