= Santoyo =

- Municipality of Spain
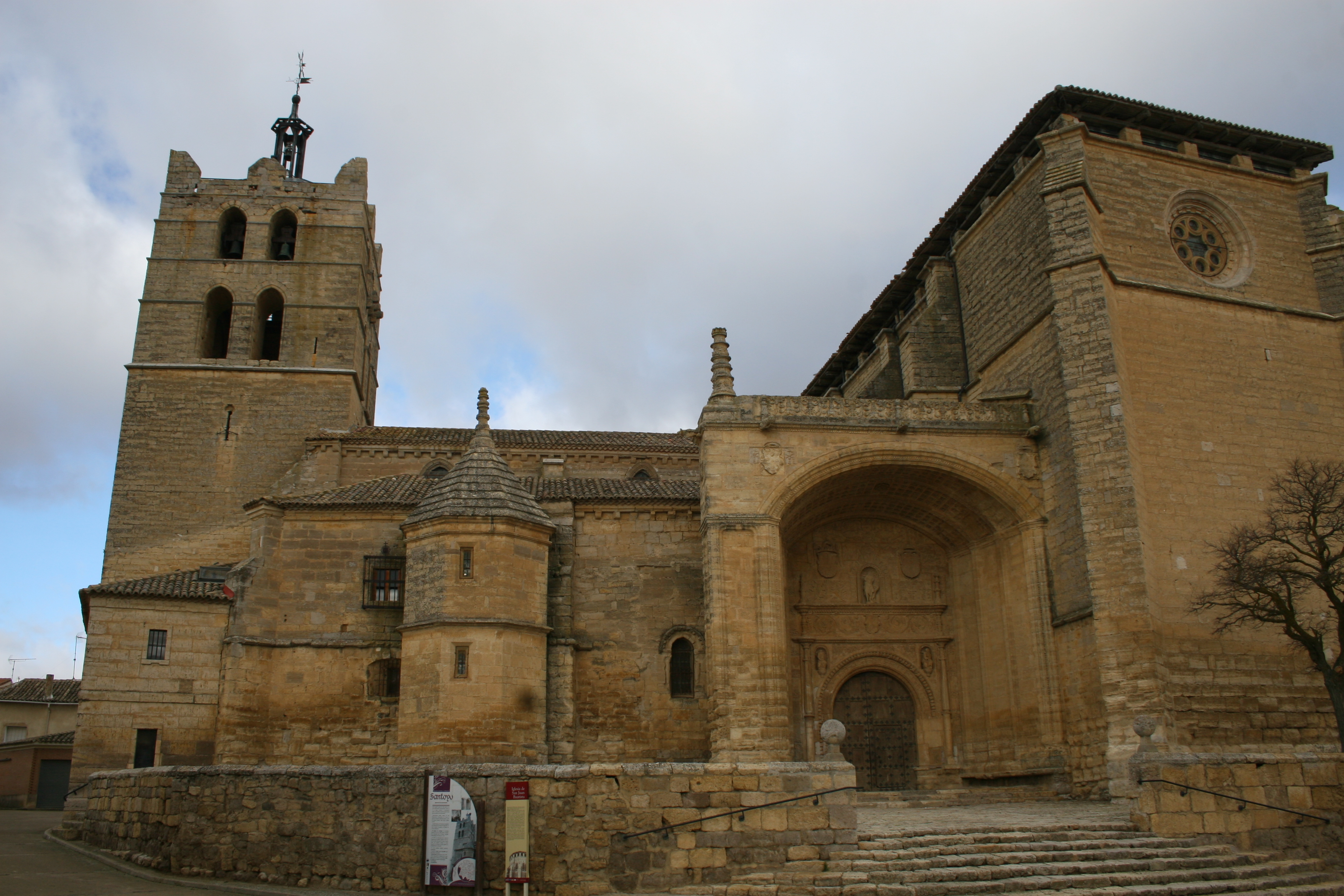
- Church of St. John the Baptist

- Flag Coat of arms

- Location of Santoyo within Castile and León Location of Santoyo within Spain Location of Santoyo within Europe
- Coordinates: 42°12′53″N 04°20′36″W
- Country: Spain
- Autonomous community: Castile and León
- Province: Palencia
- Comarca: Tierra de Campos

Government
  - Mayor: César Javier Pérez Andrés (PP)

Area
  - Total: 34.69 km^{2} (13.39 sq mi)
- Elevation: 780 m (2,560 ft)

Population (2025-01-01)
  - Total: 187
  - Density: 5.39/km^{2} (14.0/sq mi)
- Time zone: UTC+1 (CET)
  - Summer (DST): UTC+2 (CEST)
- Postal code: 34490
- Dialing code: 979
- Website: santoyo.es

Santoyo is a municipality located in the province of Palencia, Castile and León, Spain.

== History ==
The lands within the borders of the current municipality of Santoyo were populated since, at least, classical antiquity. In the Sarnallano moor some material remains of a vaccaean fort can be found. The "Las Quintanas" Roman villa was built in the Late_Roman_Empire, probably in the 4th century - in the 1990s archaeologists discovered amongst its ruins an oven, a hypocaustum, some pottery (both terra sigillata and common) and a well full of debris.

All settlements were abandoned as a consequence of the downfall of the Visigothic Kingdom. The current Santoyo is the result of a resettlement carried out in September 988 (late 10th century) under Fernán de Armentales, a vassal of count García Fernández of Castile. The name of the town itself is most probably derived from the Latin Sanctus Ioannes. In the 11th century it was a fortified town, but very scarce remains of the wall have survived.

== Church of St. John the Baptist ==
Built as a romanesque church in the late 12th century, only some windows in the central nave display this initial style. The bell tower (late 13th century) transitions to Gothic. The transept, presbytery and apse are built in late, Flamboyant Gothic (15th century) similar in style to the contemporary parts of Burgos cathedral, by Juan de Arce and Martín de Solórzano. The church's main, southern entrance is covered by a plateresque portico, known as the patriarch's portico, having been funded by Antonio de Rojas Manrique, Patriarch of the West Indies in the 16th century.

Inside the church, the most relevant element is the renaissance reredos, funded by Sebastián Cordero de Nevares. Additionally, a visigothic baptismal font and a plateresque (15th century) walnut wood pulpit can be found. The choir features a baroque organ, built in 1738 by Pedro Merino de la Rosa, carved walnut choir stalls finished in 1750 and a sixteenth-century mudéjar wooden ceiling (1490–1510).

The church has been listed as a Bien de Interés Cultural.

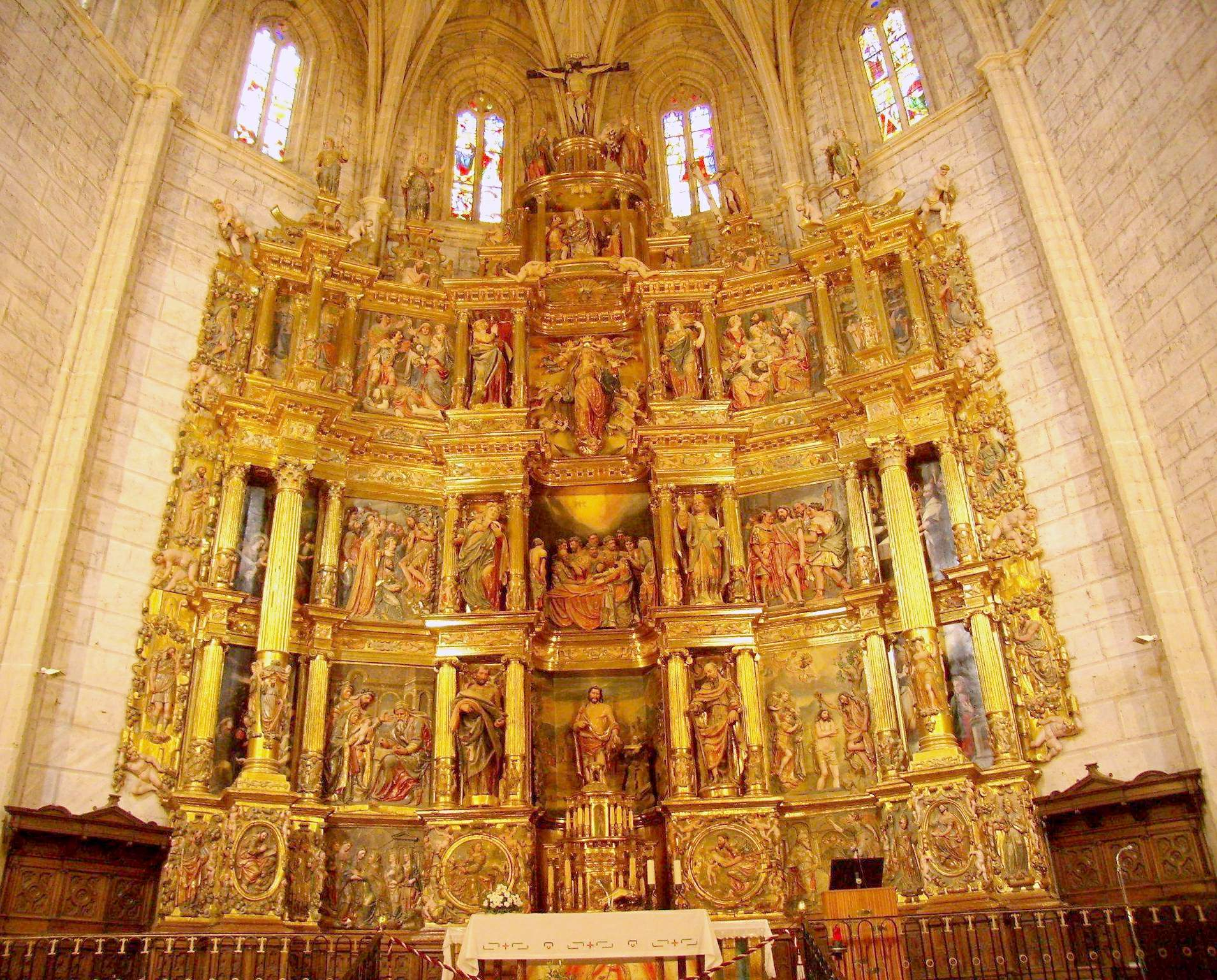
Reredos

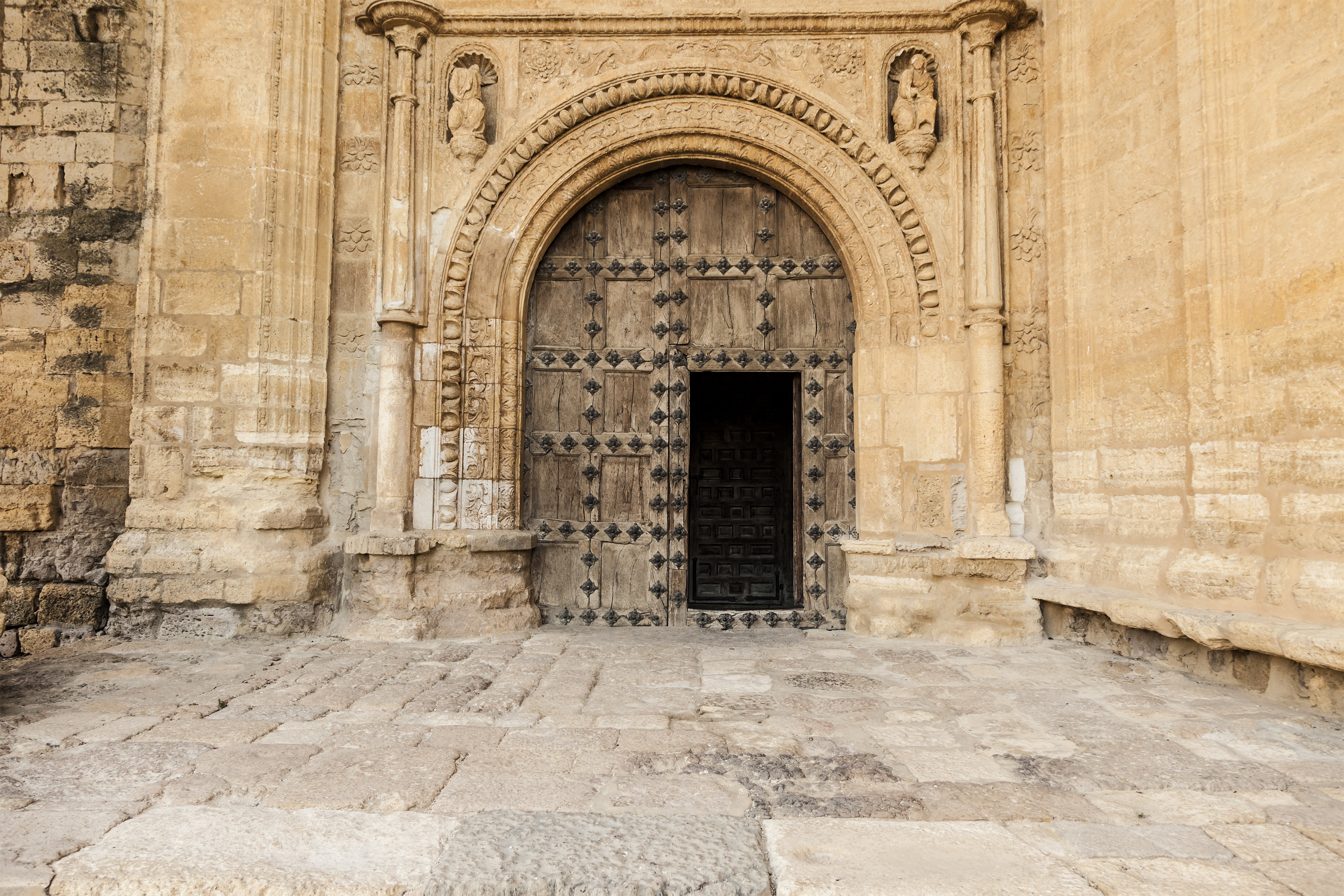
Southern entrance

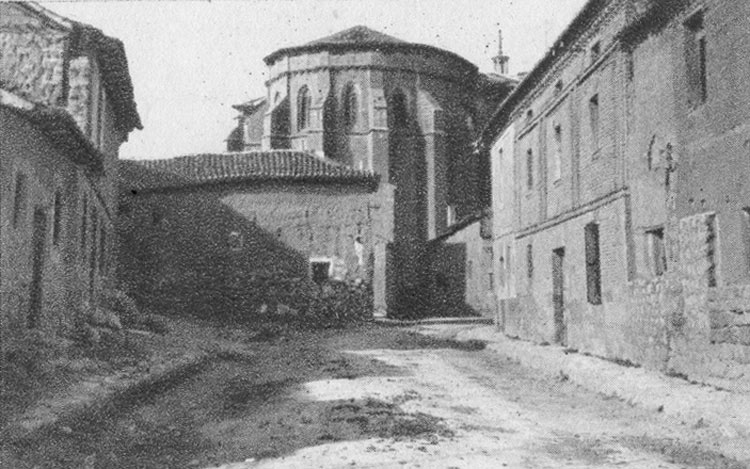
Gothic apse in the early 20th century

=== Organ ===
The organ is a baroque instrument built in 1738 by Pedro Merino de la Rosa. It features a single 45-note manual with a shorter first octave. The stoplist is as follows:

Mano izquierda (left hand): Flautado / 13'; Violón Octava Docena Quincena Decinovena Lleno III Címbala III Nasardo III Trompeta Real Clarín de bajos Bajoncillo Violetas	Mano derecha (right hand): Flautado / 13'; Violón Octava Docena Quincena Decinovena Lleno III Címbala III Corneta y Clarín de eco Trompeta Real Trompeta Magna Clarín Clarinete

== Other landmarks ==
- Chapel of Nuestra Señora de Quintanilla.
- Las Quintanas Roman villa.
- Rollo de justicia: a pillar with combined functions of pillory and perron. It is, in reality, a 20th-century reconstruction of an earlier rollo places outside the town, and some of its parts have different origins. It was built in 1977 to celebrate the 600th anniversary of the birth of Fray Pedro de Santoyo, a franciscan, founder of the Villasilos monastery. It has been listed as Bien de Interés Cultural
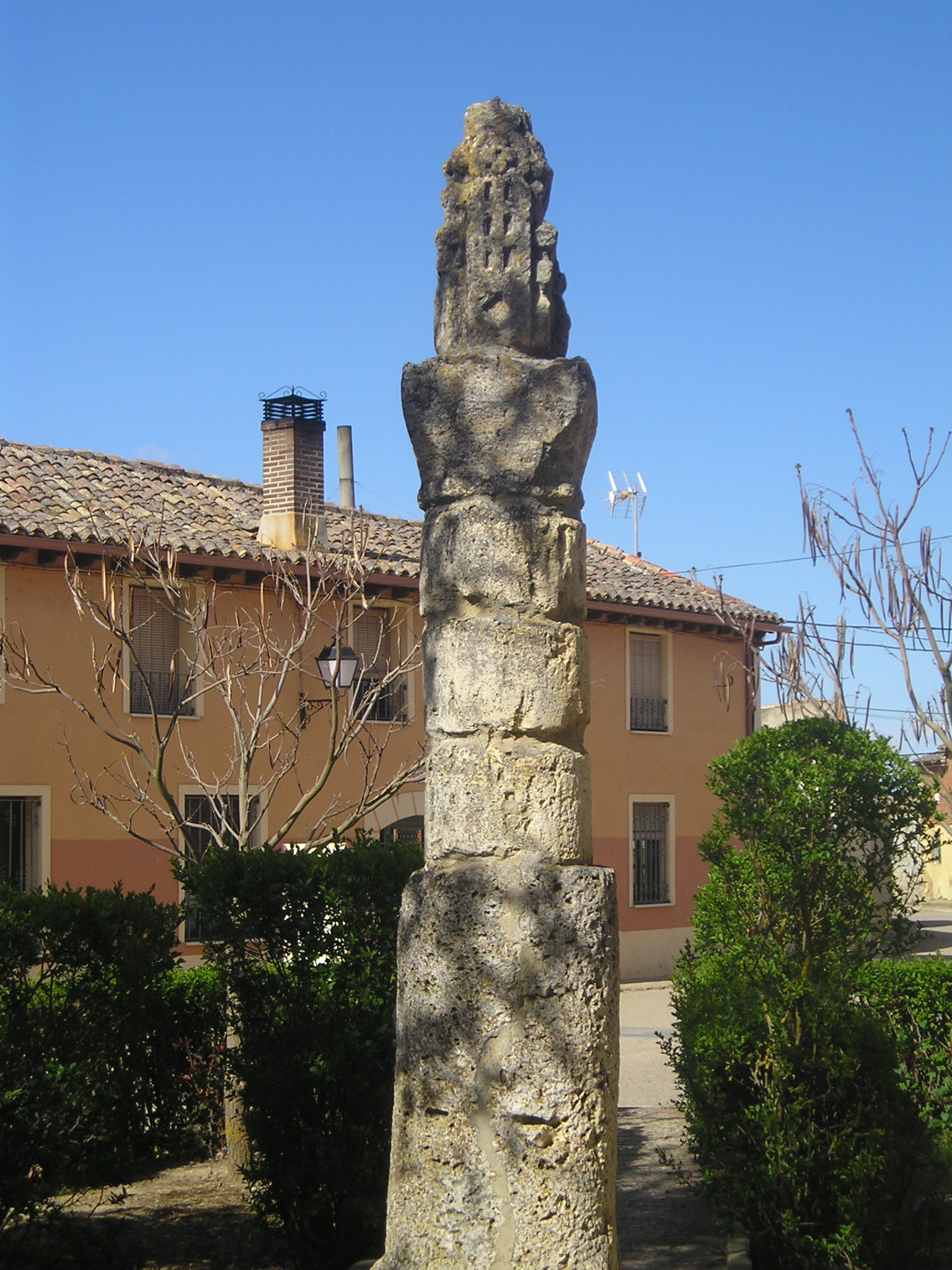
Rollo de justicia

== Museums ==
- Centro Temático del Palomar (Thematic dovecote centre): Built inside a traditional farmhouse in 2007, it explains the dove-keeping and dovecote architectural traditions in Tierra de Campos.

== Notable people ==
- Sebastián Cordero de Nevares (Santoyo, 1528 - c. 1580 ). Adviser (Royal Secretary) to king Philip II
- Isaac María Toribios Ramos (Santoyo, 11 April 1897 - Santo Domingo de Silos, 6 November 1961), abbot of Santo Domingo de Silos between 1944 and 1961.

== Demographic evolution ==
1900	1910	1920	1930	1940	1950	1960	1970	1981	1991	2012	2013	2014
1.012	997	789	717	628	618	579	494	381	295	241	235	230
