= Antonio de Fonseca =

Spanish Roman Catholic prelate and statesman

Most Reverend Antonio de Fonseca
- Bishop of Pamplona
- Church: Catholic Church
- In office: 1545-1557
- Predecessor: Pedro Pacheco de Villena
- Successor: Alvaro Moscoso

Personal details
- Born: 1503 Toro, Spain
- Died: 19 January 1557 (age 55)

Antonio de Fonseca (1503−19 January 1557) was a Roman Catholic prelate and statesman who served as Bishop of Pamplona (1545-1557).

== Biography ==
Antonio de Fonseca was born in Toro, Spain in 1503 and ordained a priest in the Order of Saint Augustine. On 9 Jan 1545, he was appointed during the papacy of Pope Paul III as Bishop of Pamplona. On 27 Jun 1550, he resigned as Bishop of Pamplona. As word of his death on 19 Jan 1557 had not yet reached the Vatican, he was appointed Patriarch of the West Indies by Pope Paul IV in 1558.

== External links and additional sources ==
- Cheney, David M. "Patriarchate of West Indies". Catholic-Hierarchy.org. (for Chronology of Bishops) ^{[self-published]}
- Chow, Gabriel. "Titular Patriarchal See of Indias Occidentales". GCatholic.org. (for Chronology of Bishops) ^{[self-published]}

Catholic Church titles
Preceded by Pedro Pacheco de Villena	Bishop of Pamplona; 1545-1557	Succeeded by Alvaro Moscoso
Preceded by Fernando Niño de Guevara	Patriarch of the West Indies; 1558 (named after death)	Succeeded by Pedro de Moya y Contreras
