= Fernando Niño =

Fernando Niño may refer to:

- Fernando Niño de Guevara (1541–1609), Spanish cardinal
- Fernando Niño (patriarch) (died 1552), Spanish prelate
- Fernando Niño (footballer, born 1974), Spanish former footballer
- Fernando Niño (footballer, born 2000), Spanish footballer
