= Palacio Buenavista, Toledo =

The Palacio Buenavista is a 16th-century palace, its history begins when the cardinal Bernardo de Sandoval y Rojas wants to build a large house on the outskirts of Toledo. Now it is a five-star hotel.

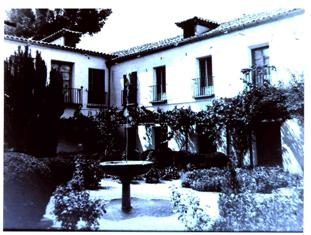
Palacio de Buenavista original.

== History ==
It was built in a place with a gentle elevation, from its enclosure is completed the silhouette of Toledo, the wide Vega and the Tagus river, which runs at the foot of the palace. It is said that it was the same El Greco who designed the plans of the Palace, venturing for a few months in architectural art giving free rein to his technique.

The palace was a meeting place, with visits such as Tirso de Molina, Cardinal Sandoval y Rojas, Covarrubias, Priest Rivadeneyra, Ercilla, Miguel de Cervantes, Baltasar Gracián and the supposed father of the work El Greco.

The garden was one of the most elaborate and cared of the moment being comparable to the gardens of the 16th century of the great palaces, with a varied flora, the visit of deer and gazelles and the company of statues of nymphs.

As early as the 20th century the palace became part of the properties of the Count of Romanones, who had a real obsession with the rustic estates, a proof of which were the many extensions that it possessed. It is said that it was in this Palace where he wrote almost all his works.

It was under the property of the Count of Romanones when the restoration of the palace-house was begun and the exteriors were adapted, giving way to a garden with meandering paths.

The Palacio de Buenavista was a meeting point for many celebrities, among them, the most illustrious would undoubtedly be the presence of Alfonso XIII, who took as base field for his hunting this strategic place.
