= Diego Ramírez Sedeño de Fuenleal =

Spanish Roman Catholic prelate

Most Reverend Diego Ramírez Sedeño de Fuenleal
- Bishop of Pamplona
- Church: Catholic Church
- Diocese: Diocese of Pamplona
- In office: 1561–1573
- Predecessor: Alvaro Moscoso
- Successor: Antonio Manrique Valencia

Personal details
- Born: 1524 Villaescusa de Haro, Spain
- Died: 27 January 1573 (age 49) Pamplona, Spain

Diego Ramírez Sedeño de Fuenleal (1524 – 27 January 1573) was a Roman Catholic prelate who served as Bishop of Pamplona (1561–1573).

== Biography ==
Diego Ramírez Sedeño de Fuenleal was born in 1524 in Villaescusa de Haro, Spain. On 13 June 1561, he was appointed during the papacy of Pope Pius IV as Bishop of Pamplona. He served as Bishop of Pamplona until his death on 27 January 1573. While bishop, he was the principal consecrator of Francisco Delgado López, Bishop of Lugo (1562); and Sebastián Lartaún, Bishop of Cuzco (1571).

Catholic Church titles
Preceded by Alvaro Moscoso	Bishop of Pamplona; 1561–1573	Succeeded by Antonio Manrique Valencia
