= Ángel Riesco Carbajo =

Spanish Roman Catholic prelate

Venerable Ángel Riesco Carbajo
- Auxiliary Bishop Emeritus of Pamplona
- Church: Roman Catholic Church
- Archdiocese: Pamplona
- See: Pamplona
- Appointed: 15 February 1958
- Term ended: 23 November 1969
- Successor: José María Larrauri Lafuente
- Other post: Titular Bishop of Limisa (1958-72)

Orders
- Ordination: 25 July 1926 by Antonio Senso Lázaro
- Consecration: 11 May 1958 by Ildebrando Antoniutti

Personal details
- Born: Ángel Riesco Carbajo; 9 July 1902 Bercianos de Vidriales, Zamora, Spain
- Died: 2 July 1972 (aged 69) La Bañeza, León, Spain
- Buried: Iglesia de Santa María de La Bañeza

Sainthood
- Venerated in: Roman Catholic Church
- Attributes: Episcopal attire
- Patronage: Misioneras Apostólicas de la Caridad

Ángel Riesco Carbajo (9 July 1902 – 2 July 1972) was a Spanish Roman Catholic prelate who served as a bishop in the Pamplona archdiocese and was the founder of the Misioneras Apostólicas de la Caridad. Riesco spent some time in Argentina as an emigrant before he returned to his homeland for a scholarship that saw his ecclesial studies spent in Madrid and Santander. He served as a parish priest following his ordination and in 1957 in Astorga founded a religious congregation dedicated to women. Months later he became a bishop but retired a decade later due to poor health that he later died from not long after.

Riesco's beatification process launched in 1994 and he became titled as a Servant of God. His cause advanced in mid-2019 after Pope Francis named him Venerable upon confirming that the late bishop had practiced heroic virtue throughout his life.

== Life ==
Ángel Riesco Carbajo was born on 9 July 1902 in Bercianos de Vidriales in the Zamora department in Spain as the first of three children. In his childhood he emigrated to Argentina when he was eight but later returned to his homeland after he turned twelve.

He commenced his ecclesial studies under the Jesuits at the Comillas Pontifical University in Madrid and also in Santander after he had received a scholarship. Riesco received his ordination to the priesthood in Astorga on 25 July 1926 from the diocesan bishop Antonio Senso Lázaro and following this celebrated his first Mass on 22 August in his hometown parish. He first started as a coadjutor for the San Salvador parish in La Bañeza where he founded a small Catholic Action group since he prioritized working with them as an apostolic movement. In 1932 he founded the newspaper El Adelanto Bañezano.

He was considered a good catechist that cared for the poor and tended to the sick and who also had a profound devotion to both the Mother of God and Saint Joseph. This helped characterize his pastoral career since he made these the focus for his mission as a priest. He also collaborated with Catholic Action and other apostolic movements that helped to promote the faith.

In 1957 he was appointed as the vicar general for the Astorga diocese where - also in 1957 - he founded the Misioneras Apostólicas de la Caridad. This came after he made it a focus for his time in Astorga to focus on helping women who faced disadvantaged economic situations. Pope Pius XII named Riesco on 15 February 1958 as the Titular Bishop of Limisa and the Auxiliary Bishop of Pamplona; he received his episcopal consecration on 11 May from Ildebrando Antoniutti while the co-consecrators were the Bishop of Astorga José Castelltort Subeyre and the Bishop of Jaca Ángel Hidalgo Ibáñez. Riesco attended the first as well as the third and fourth sessions of the Second Vatican Council. Riesco retired his position on 23 November 1969 due to poor health and moved to La Bañeza where he would dedicate himself to the governance and works of his order. He died there on 2 July 1972 due to a heart attack and his remains are interred in the Santa María de La Bañeza church. His order received papal approval from Pope John Paul II on 15 August 1982 (a decade following Riesco's death) and it now extends to countries such as Peru and Mexico.

== Beatification process ==
The beatification process opened on 26 May 1994 after the Congregation for the Causes of Saints named Riesco as a Servant of God upon issuing the formal "nihil obstat" (no objections) edict; the diocesan process was conducted from 12 October 1995 until 1 May 1997 while the C.C.S. validated the process on 24 April 1998 as having done its work. The Positio dossier was submitted to the C.C.S. in 2016 for assessment. Pope Francis named Riesco as Venerable on 5 July 2019 after confirming that the late bishop lived a life of heroic virtue.

Riesco's beatification depends upon papal confirmation of a miraculous healing attributed to him that neither science or medicine could explain. The possible miracle for beatification was investigated in the diocese of its origin from 14 April 2004 until some months later on 12 October. The C.C.S. validated this process on 27 April 2007.

The current postulator for this cause is Dr. Silvia Mónica Correale.
