= Juan Guzmán (patriarch) =

Most Reverend Juan Guzmán
- Patriarch of the West Indies
- Church: Catholic Church
- In office: 1602–1605
- Predecessor: Pedro de Moya y Contreras
- Successor: Juan Bautista Acevedo Muñoz

Personal details
- Died: 1605

Juan Guzmán (died 1605) was a Roman Catholic prelate who served as Patriarch of the West Indies (1602–1605).

== Biography ==
On 15 November 1602, Juan Guzmán was appointed during the papacy of Pope Clement VIII as Patriarch of the West Indies. He served in that position until his death in 1605.

== External links and additional sources ==
- Cheney, David M. "Patriarchate of West Indies". Catholic-Hierarchy.org. (for Chronology of Bishops) ^{[self-published]}
- Chow, Gabriel. "Titular Patriarchal See of Indias Occidentales". GCatholic.org. (for Chronology of Bishops) ^{[self-published]}

Catholic Church titles
Preceded by Pedro de Moya y Contreras	Patriarch of West Indies; 1602–1605	Succeeded by Juan Bautista Acevedo Muñoz
