= Marcelino Olaechea =

Spanish Catholic archbishop

Servant of God Marcelino Olaechea Loizaga
- Archbishop Emeritus of Valencia
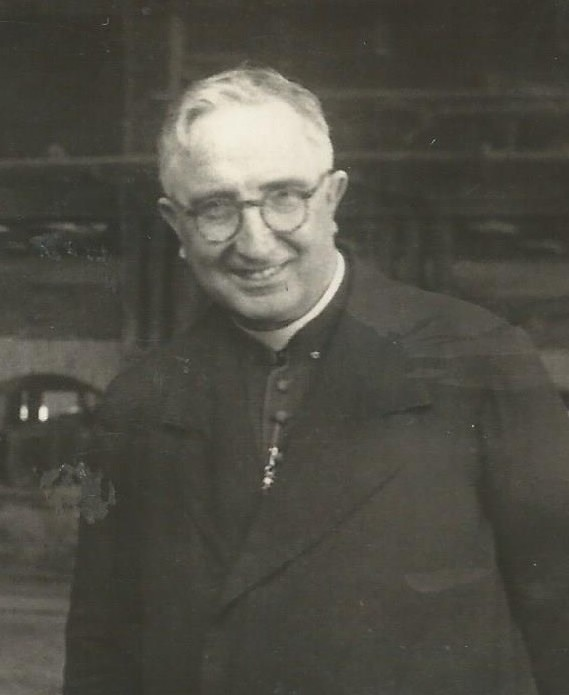
- Church: Roman Catholic Church
- Archdiocese: Valencia
- See: Valencia
- Appointed: 17 February 1946
- Installed: 18 February 1946
- Term ended: 19 November 1966
- Predecessor: Prudencio Melo Alcalde
- Successor: José María García Lahiguera
- Other posts: Bishop of Pamplona (1935 - 1946); Titular Archbishop of Subbar (1966 - 1970)

Orders
- Ordination: 20 December 1915
- Consecration: 27 October 1935 by Federico Tedeschini

Personal details
- Born: 9 January 1888 Baracaldo, Biscay, Spain
- Died: 21 October 1972 (aged 84) Valencia, Spain

Sainthood
- Venerated in: Roman Catholic Church
- Title as Saint: Servant of God

Marcelino Olaechea (Marcelino Olaechea Loizaga) (9 January 1889, Baracaldo, Biscay - 21 October 1972, Valencia) was a Spanish Catholic religious, S.D.B, and Bishop of Pamplona during the Spanish Civil War.

His father worked in the iron and steel industry and so on Olaechea's episcopal coat of arms, instead of lions rampant or eagles with two heads, a chimney of the Altos Hornos iron foundry at Bilbao appeared. He joined the Salesian Society of St John Bosco, and attained a high administrative position in that congregation, until 25 August 1935, when he was appointed Bishop of Pamplona. His episcopal consecration, at the hands of Federico Tedeschini, the Papal Nuncio, was celebrated in Madrid on 27 October. He was the first Salesian bishop of Spain.

On 18 February 1946 he was translated to the Archbishop's see of Valencia and he died there on 21 October 1972.

== Spanish Civil War ==
Following the outbreak of the Spanish Civil War, across the whole of the part of Spain which called itself 'National', the bishops sought to keep control of the priests that had gone as volunteers with the columns or militias, placing themselves at the orders of the military chiefs. The regulations that Olaechea introduced to preserve discipline over the military chaplains were numerous.

== 15 November 1936, No More Blood! ==
The most famous of Olaechea's deeds during the Civil War was his sermon of 15 November 1936 No mas sangre (No More Blood), during the act of granting insignia to the Accion Catolica Feminina. Olaechea condemned the practice, often repeated, of executions that were like lynchings. When a man had been killed at the front and his body brought back to his town, the ceremony often concluded with the rapid execution, without any legal process whatever, of some rojillos, ( little reds, meaning contemptible), from the locale. Olaechea sought to subdue the murders; " Forgiveness! Forgiveness! No more blood, no more blood! No more blood than Christ the Lord wishes to be spilt, by way of intercession, on the fields of battle, to save our glorious and shattered fatherland; [-] Catholics! When there arrives in the village the body of a hero who has died in battle and we feel the blood boil in our veins [-] then let there be a man and let there be a woman who, stretch out their arms over him and cry with all their strength 'No! No! Hold back! the blood of our son is blood that redeems us; we can hear his voice, like the voice of Jesus on the cross 'forgive!' Let no one be touched because of our son ! Let no one suffer! Let all be forgiven! If you wreak vengeance now, he would curse you, I and my son would curse you'. "

In the villages and towns people knew who had voted for which party - known leftists were at risk when the funeral of a volunteer was announced. If a person simply had rarely gone to Mass, or practised the sacraments, he was at risk. Olaechea noted the 'souls' who had come flocking to the Church that hadn't come before; - " they bring fear with them as well, piercing the soul like a dagger. And we have to win them over with the sincerity of our faith, with the sincerity of our love, with social justice and with charity." In the rebel zone, a life could depend on the testimony of a parish priest concerning the religious practice of the accused. In many localities all that was needed for a person to be shot was for the priest to declare that before the war the accused did not go to Mass. At a different level, the removal of schoolteachers could also depend on the testimonies of parish priests.

== Bibliography ==
- Raguer Suñer, Hilario M. Gunpowder and Incense: the Catholic Church and the Spanish Civil War; translated from Spanish by Gerald Howson. London: Routledge, 2007 ISBN 0-415-31889-0 (translated from the Spanish "La Polvora y el Incienso")
