= Pedro de Lafuente =

Spanish Roman Catholic prelate

Most Reverend Pedro de Lafuente
- Bishop of Pamplona
- Church: Catholic Church
- Diocese: Diocese of Pamplona
- In office: 1578–1587
- Predecessor: Antonio Manrique Valencia
- Successor: Bernardo Sandoval Rojas

Orders
- Consecration: December 1578 by Francisco Pacheco de Villena

Personal details
- Died: 13 August 1587 Pamplona, Spain

Pedro de Lafuente (died 13 August 1587) was a Roman Catholic prelate who served as Bishop of Pamplona (1578–1587).

== Biography ==
On 28 February 1575, Pedro de Lafuente was appointed during the papacy of Pope Gregory XIII as Bishop of Pamplona. In December 1578, he was consecrated bishop by Francisco Pacheco de Villena, Archbishop of Burgos. He served as Bishop of Pamplona until his death on 13 August 1587.

Catholic Church titles
Preceded by Antonio Manrique Valencia	Bishop of Pamplona; 1578–1587	Succeeded by Bernardo Sandoval Rojas
