= Archdiocese of Pamplona and Tudela =

Roman Catholic archdiocese in Spain

Coordinates: 42.8197°N 1.6410°W

Archdiocese of Pamplona y Tudela Archidioecesis Pampilonensis et Tudelensis Archidiócesis de Pamplona y Tudela (es) Iruñeko eta Tuterako artxidiozesia (eu)

Catholic
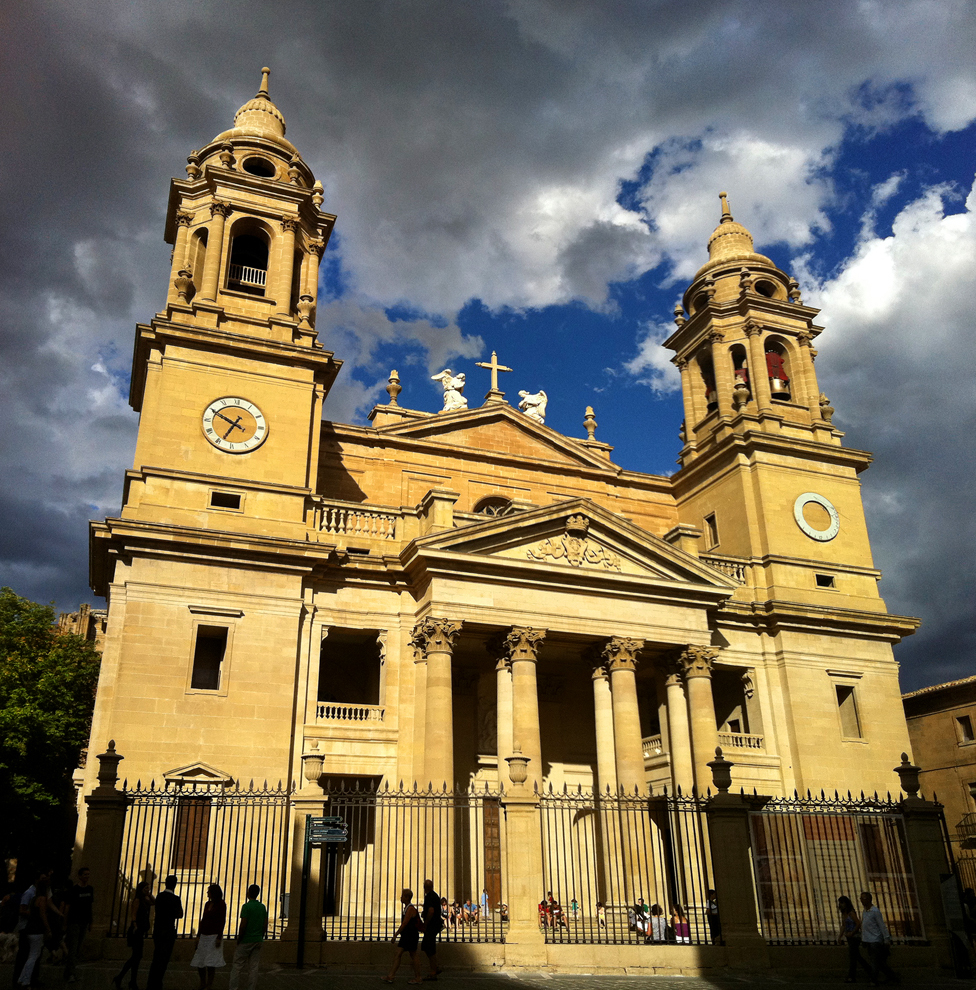
- Pamplona Cathedral

Location
- Country: Spain
- Ecclesiastical province: Pamplona

Statistics
- Area: 10,421 km^{2} (4,024 sq mi)
- Population: Total; Catholics: (as of 2004); 578,210; 573,386 (99.2%)

Information
- Denomination: Roman Catholic
- Rite: Latin Rite
- Established: 5th century (as Diocese of Pamplona); 5 September 1851 (as Diocese of Pamplona-Tudela); 17 July 1889 (as Diocese of Pamplona); 2 September 1955 (as Diocese of Pamplona-Tudela); 11 August 1956 (as Archdiocese of Pamplona-Tudela); 11 August 1984 (as Archdiocese of Pamplona y Tudela)
- Cathedral: Cathedral of the Assumption of Our Lady in Pamplona
- Co-cathedral: Co-Cathedral of Our Lady of Solitude in Tudela

Current leadership
- Pope: Leo XIV
- Metropolitan Archbishop: Florencio Roselló Avellanas, O. de M.
- Suffragans: Diocese of Calahorra and La Calzada-Logroño; Diocese of Jaca; Diocese of San Sebastián
- Bishops emeritus: Francisco Pérez González (Archbishop Emeritus)

Map
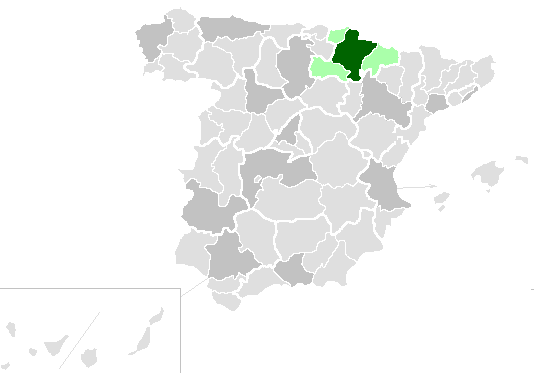

Website
- Website of the Archdiocese

The Archdiocese of Pamplona and Tudela (Latin: Archidioecesis Pampilonensis et Tudelensis) is a Latin Church archdiocese of the Catholic Church located in the cities of Pamplona and Tudela in Spain.

== Timeline ==
- 5th century: Established as Diocese of Pamplona
- 9th century: northern boundary established by Charles's Cross
- 5 September 1851: Renamed as Diocese of Pamplona – Tudela
- 17 July 1889: Renamed as Diocese of Pamplona
- 2 September 1955: Renamed as Diocese of Pamplona – Tudela
- 11 August 1956: Promoted as Metropolitan Archdiocese of Pamplona – Tudela
- 11 August 1984: Renamed as Metropolitan Archdiocese of Pamplona y Tudela

== Leadership ==
=== Bishops of Pamplona ===
- Firminus (late 3rd century)
- Liliolus (before 589, after 592)
- John I (fl. 610)
- Atilanus (fl. 683)
- Marcianus (fl. 693)
- Opilanus (fl. 829)
- Wiliesind (848–860)

In 850, in the face of a Muslim invasion, the seat of the bishop was transferred to Leire.

=== Bishops of Pamplona at Leire ===
- Jimeno I (876–914)
- Basilio (918–922)
- Galindo (922–928)
- Valentín (928–947)
- Blasco I (971–972)
- Bibas (979–???)
- Julian (983–985)
- Sisebut (988–997)
- Jimeno II (1000–1005)
- Sancho I el Mayor (1015–1024)

In 1023, the see was reestablished in Pamplona.

=== Bishops of Pamplona ===
- Sancho II el Menor (1025–1051)
- John II (1052–1068)
- Blasco II (1068–1078/79)
- García Ramírez (1078/79–1082)
  - Sancha of Aragon (1082–1083), regent
- Pedro de Roda (1083–1115)
- William I (Guillermo) (1122)
- Sancho de Larrosa (1122–1142)
- Lope de Artajona (1143–1159)
- Sancho III (1160–1164)
- Pedro Compostelano (1162–1164)
- Raymond (1163)
- Bibiano (1165–1166)
- Peter of Paris (1167–1193)
- Martín de Tafalla (1193–1194), elected
- García Ferrández (1194–1205)
- Juan de Tarazona (1205–1211)
- Espárago de la Barca (1212–1215)
- William of Saintonge (1215–1219)
- Remiro de Navarra (1220–1229)
- Pedro Ramírez de Pedrola (1230–1238)

Between 1238 and 1242, the throne was vacant while the chapter was divided between supporters of Lope García and of the archdeacon Guillermo de Oriz.

- Pedro Jiménez de Gazólaz (1242–1266)
- Armingot (1268–1277)
- Miguel Sánchez de Uncastillo (1277–1286)
- Miguel Periz de Legaria (1288–1304)
- Rodrigo Ibáñez de Medrano (1304–1310)
- Arnaud de Poyanne (1310–1316)
- Guillaume Mechin (1316–1317)
- Raul Rossellet (1317)
- Michel Maucondiut (1317), elected
- Semén García de Asiáin (1317), elected
- Arnaud de Barbazan (1318–1355)
- Pierre de Monteruc (1355–1356)
- Miguel Sánchez de Asiáin (1356–1364)
- Bernard Folcaut (1364–1377)
- Martín de Zalba (1377–1390)

Martín resigned the see to become a cardinal in 1390, but he continued as apostolic administrator until 1403.

- Miguel de Zalba, cardinal (1404–1406), elected
  - Martín de Eusa (1406–1407), vicar general
  - Nicolás López de Roncesvalles (1407–1408), vicar
  - García de Aibar (1408), vicar general
  - Lancelot de Navarra (1408–1420), vicar general
- Sancho Sánchez de Oteiza (1420–1425)
- Martín de Peralta I (1426–1456)
- Martín de Peralta II (1457–1458)
  - Basilios Bessarion, cardinal (1458–1462), apostolic administrator
- Nicolás de Echávarri (1462–1469)
- Alfonso Carrillo (1473–1491)
- César Borja, cardinal (1491–1492), transferred to the archdiocese of Valencia
  - Antonio Pallavicino Gentili, cardinal (1492–1507), apostolic administrator
  - Fazio Giovanni Santori, cardinal (1507–1510), apostolic administrator
  - Amaneu de Labrit, cardinal (1510–1512), apostolic administrator (first time)
  - Giovanni Ruffo de Theodoli (1512–1517), apostolic administrator
  - Amaneu de Labrit (1517–1520), apostolic administrator (second time)
  - Alessandro Cesarini, cardinal (1520–1538), apostolic administrator, resigned
- Juan Remmia (1538–1539)
- Pedro Pacheco Ladrón de Guevara, cardinal (1539–1545), transferred to the diocese of Jaén
- Antonio de Fonseca (1545–1550), resigned
- Álvaro Moscoso (1550–1561), transferred to the diocese of Zamora
- Diego Ramírez Sedeño de Fuenleal (1561–1573)
- Antonio Manrique Valencia (1575–1577)
- Pedro de Lafuente (1578–1587)
- Bernardo de Sandoval y Rojas (1588–1596), transferred to the diocese of Jaén
- Antonio Zapata y Cisneros (1596–1600), transferred to the archdiocese of Burgos
- Mateo de Burgos (1600–1606), transferred to the diocese of Sigüenza
- Antonio Venegas y Figueroa (1606–1612), transferred to the diocese of Sigüenza
- Prudencio de Sandoval (1612–1620)
- Francisco Hurtado de Mendoza y Ribera (1621–1622), transferred to the diocese of Málaga
- Cristóbal de Lobera y Torres (1623–1625), transferred to the diocese of Córdoba
- José González Díez (1625–1627), transferred to the archdiocese of Santiago de Compostela
- Pedro Fernández Zorrilla (1627–1637)
- Juan Queipo de Llano y Flórez (1639–1647), transferred to the diocese of Jaén
- Francisco Diego Alarcón y Covarrubias (1648–1657), transferred to the diocese of Córdoba
- Diego de Tejada y la Guardia (1658–1663)
- Andrés Girón (1664–1670)
- Pedro Roche (1670–1683)
- Juan Grande Santos de San Pedro (1683–1692)
- Toribio de Mier (1693–1698)
- Juan Íñiguez Arnedo (1700–1710)
- Pedro Aguado (1713–1716)
- Juan Camargo Angulo (1716–1725)
- Andrés Murillo Velarde (1725–1728)
- Melchor Angel Gutiérrez Vallejo (1729–1734)
- Francisco Ignacio Añoa y Busto (1735–1742), transferred to the archdiocese of Zaragoza
- Gaspar Miranda Argáiz (1742–1767)
- Juan Lorenzo Irigoyen Dutari (1768–1778)
- Agustín de Lezo Palomeque (1779–1783), transferred to the archdiocese of Zaragoza
- Esteban Antonio Aguado Rojas (1785–1795)
- Lorenzo Igual de Soria (1795–1803), transferred to the diocese of Plasencia
- Veremundo Anselmo Arias Teixeiro (1804–1814), transferred to the archdiocese of Valencia
- Joaquín Javier Uriz Lasaga (1815–1829)
- Severo Leonardo Andriani Escofet (1829–1861)
- Pedro Cirilo Uriz Labayru (1861–1870)
- José Oliver y Hurtado (1875–1886)
- Antonio Ruiz–Cabal y Rodríguez (1886–1899)
- José López Mendoza y García (1899–1923)
- Mateo Múgica y Urrestarazu (1923–1928), transferred to the diocese of Vitoria
- Tomás Muñiz Pablos (1928–1935), transferred to the archdiocese of Santiago de Compostela
- Marcelino Olaechea Loizaga (1935–1946), transferred to the archdiocese of Valencia
- Enrique Delgado y Gómez (1946–1955), became also bishop of Tudela

=== Bishops of Pamplona and Tudela ===
- Enrique Delgado y Gómez (1955–1956), the Diocese was promoted to Metropolitan Archdiocese of Pamplona – Tudela

=== Archbishops of Pamplona and Tudela ===
- Enrique Delgado y Gómez (1956–1968)
- Arturo Tabera Araoz, cardinal (1968–1971)
- José Méndez Asensio (1971–1978), transferred to the archdiocese of Granada
- José María Cirarda Lachiondo (1978–1993)
- Fernando Sebastián Aguilar (1993–2007)
- Francisco Pérez González (2007–2023), Retired
- Florencio Roselló Avellanas, O. de M. (2023–)

=== Auxiliary bishops ===
- Ángel Riesco Carbajo (1958–1969)
- José María Larrauri Lafuente (1970–1979), transferred to the diocese of Vitoria
- Juan Antonio Aznárez Cobo (2012–2021), transferred to the military ordinariate of Spain

== Suffragan dioceses ==
- Calahorra y La Calzada-Logroño
- Jaca
- San Sebastián

== See also ==
- Roman Catholicism in Spain

== Sources ==
- GCatholic.org
- Catholic Hierarchy
- Diocese website
