= Juan Bautista de Acevedo =

Spanish bishop and Grand Inquisitor of Spain

The Most Reverend Juan Bautista de Acevedo
- Patriarch of the West Indies
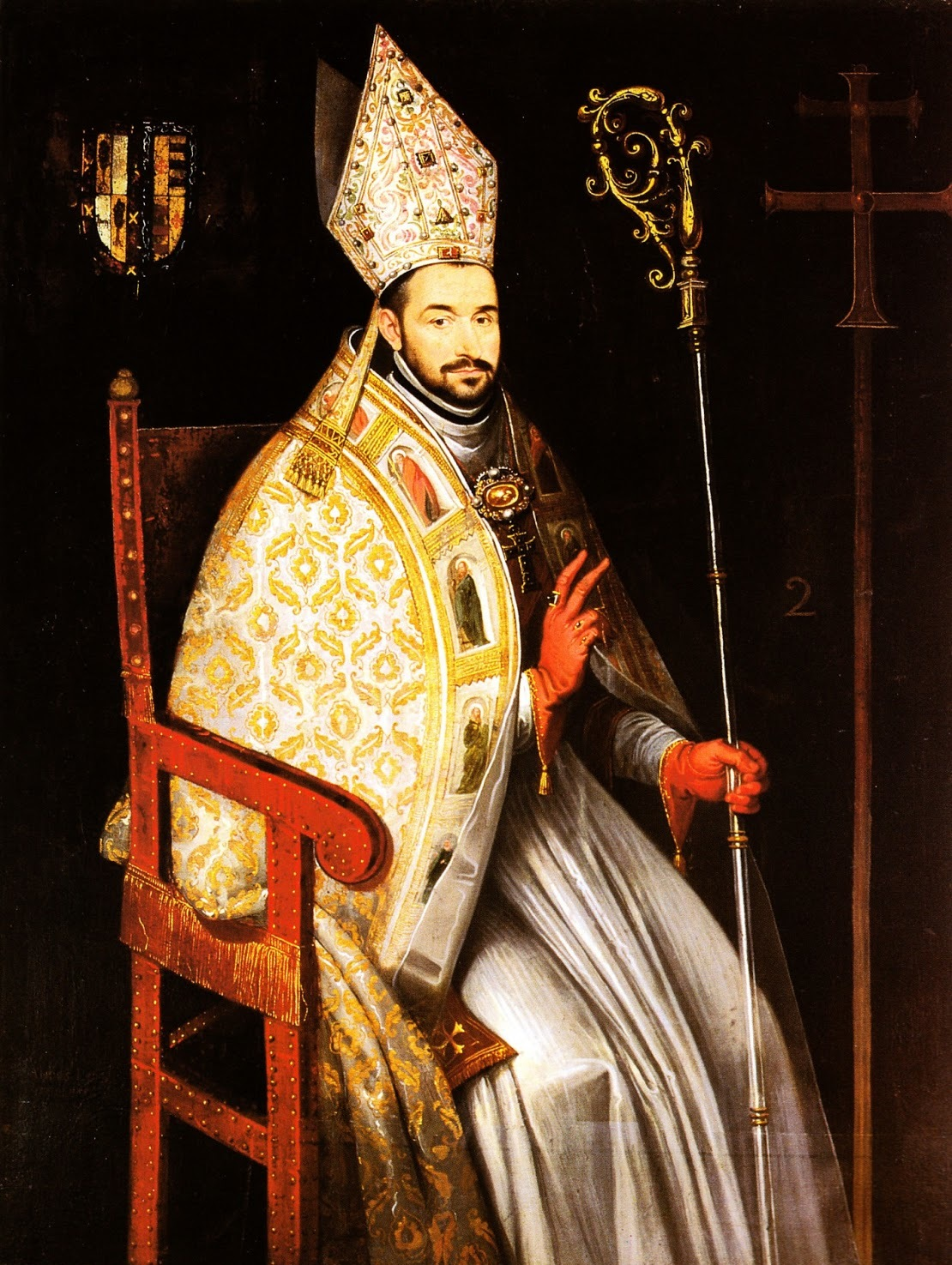
- Portrait of Juan Bautista de Acevedo (c. 1608) by Andrés López Polanco
- Church: Roman Catholic
- Appointed: 16 January 1606
- Term ended: 8 June 1608
- Predecessor: Juan Guzmán
- Successor: Pedro Manso
- Previous posts: Bishop of Valladolid (1601–06)

Orders
- Consecration: 17 June 1601 by Fernando Niño de Guevara

Personal details
- Born: 1555 Hoz de Anero, Spain
- Died: 8 June 1608 (aged 52–53) Valladolid, Spain

Juan Bautista de Acevedo y Muñoz (1555 – 8 July 1608) was a Spanish churchman who was Patriarch of the West Indies. He had been Bishop of Valladolid from 1601 to 1606 and Grand Inquisitor of Spain from 1603 to 1608.

== Biography ==
Juan Bautista de Acevedo y Muñoz was born in Hoz de Anero, Trasmiera in 1555, the son of Juan González de Acevedo and of Sancha González Muñoz. Born into a distinguished but not rich family, he was the eldest of eleven children, only three of which reached adulthood. His brother Francisco became merino of Trasmiera; and his brother Fernando was Bishop of Osma 1610-13 and Archbishop of Burgos 1613–29.

Juan was educated at the Jesuit grammar school in León, Spain and then at the University of Salamanca, where he studied canon law and law. A bright student, he drew the attention of Andrés Santos de Sampedro, Archbishop of Zaragoza, who chose him as his nephews' tutor, first in León, then in Zaragoza. He later received a doctorate from the University of Lleida.

Upon the death of Archbishop Santos in 1586, he moved to Madrid, where Gaspar de Quiroga y Vela planned to make him an inquisitor, though he never actually appointed him to the post. Instead, the Marquis of Denia (who was later the favourite of Philip III of Spain) chose him as tutor for his son Cristóbal. As a member of the Marquis' household, he became prominent at court, where he was associated with Mateo Vázquez de Leca and García Loaysa y Girón. Philip II of Spain appointed him to the Chapel Royal and offered to make him Bishop of Naples, but Acevedo refused the appointment. He was named administrator of the Convent of Santa Isabel in 1592. He was made a canon of the León Cathedral in 1598, and of the Cathedral of Toledo a short time later. In 1600, the new king, Philip III, offered to make Acevedo Bishop of Tortosa, but he again refused the appointment.

Acevedo was appointed Bishop of Valladolid on 30 April 1601 and he was consecrated as a bishop by Fernando Niño de Guevara, Archbishop of Seville, on 17 June 1601. Following the death of Grand Inquisitor Juan de Zúñiga Flores, Acevedo was appointed in 1603 Grand Inquisitor of Spain.

He was appointed Patriarch of the West Indies on 16 January 1606. Avecedo resigned as Bishop of Valladolid on 28 April 1606, returning to the court at Madrid.

He died in Valladolid on 8 July 1608 as a result of complications related to a renal colic. He was initially buried in the Church of San Martín in Valladolid. He was reburied in the family chapel at the Palacio de los Acebedo de Hoznayo in 1618.

Catholic Church titles
| Preceded by Bartolomé de la Plaza | Bishop of Valladolid; 1601–1606 | Succeeded by Juan Vigil de Quiñones y Labiada |
| Preceded by Juan de Zúñiga Flores | Grand Inquisitor of Spain; 1603–1608 | Succeeded by Bernardo de Sandoval y Rojas |
| Preceded by Juan Guzmán | Patriarch of the West Indies; 1606–1608 | Succeeded by Pedro Manso |
