= Martín de Zalba =

Chancellor of Navarre from 1376 to 1396

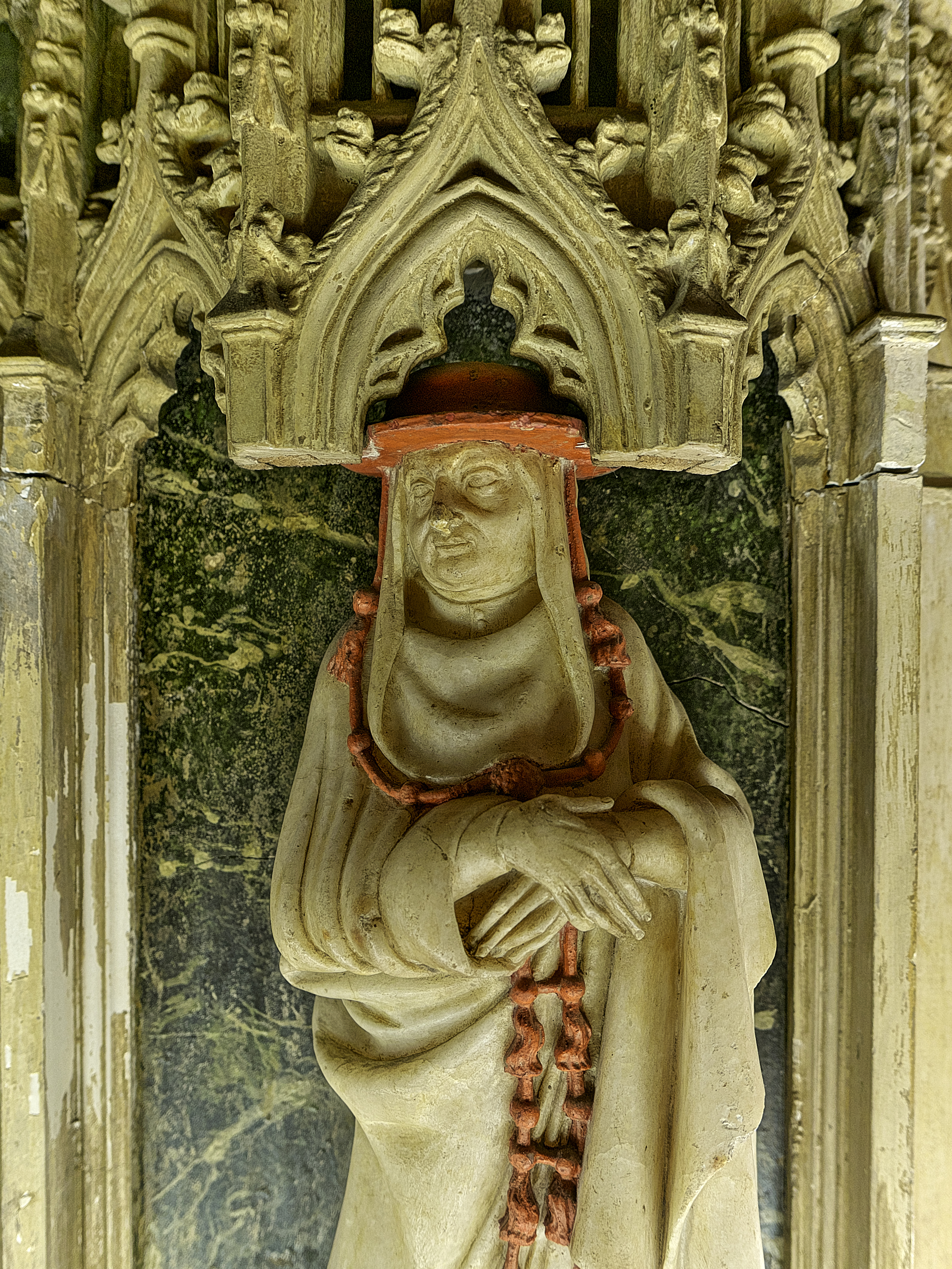
Possible representation of Martín de Zalba among the mourners on the tomb of Charles III of Navarre and Eleanor of Castile

Martín de Zalba (c. 1337 – 27 October 1403) was a Navarrese cleric and statesman who served as the chancellor of the kingdom from 1376 until 1396 and as the bishop of Pamplona from 1377 until his death. From 1390, he was also a cardinal of the Avignon obedience.

== Early life and education ==
Martín was born around 1337 in Pamplona into a merchant family originally from Zalba. His primary schooling took place in the cathedral of Pamplona. He attended the universities of Toulouse, Bologna and Avignon, where he obtained his doctorate in laws in 1365. He had knowledge of several languages. According to Dietrich of Niem, he taught canon law at Avignon.

Martín received his first canonry in 1363 and came to hold various canonries throughout Spain. During the episcopate of Jean de Saie (r. 1363–1375), he served as the vicar general of the diocese of Dax, which covered the Navarrese territory of Ultrapuertos. In 1373, he became the dean of Tudela. In 1375, he was placed in charge of the parish of San Martín de Unx with the rank of deacon while residing at the Avignonese curia. In 1376, King Charles II of Navarre appointed him chancellor, a largely honorific position by that time.

== Bishop and schism ==
On 16 December 1377, Martín was appointed bishop of Pamplona. Having been appointed a referendary by Pope Gregory XI, he remained in Avignon and governed his diocese through two vicars general, Ferrando Ibáñez de Huarte and García Martínez de Larraga, both with legal training. He was one of the papal delegates to the peace conference held in Sarzana in March 1378 to end the War of the Eight Saints. On 19 April 1378, the newly crowned Pope Urban VI accused the bishops resident at the curia of being perjurers. According to Dietrich of Niem, among the bishops present, only Martín spoke out in their defence.

Martín's reputation for learning and sanctity is well attested in accounts of the start of the Great Schism in 1378. There are conflicting accounts of his role the early days. According to Martín de Alpartil, the dissident cardinals gathered at Anagni intending to freely confirm the election of Urban VI. They sent Martín to mediate, but Count Nicola Orsini convinced Urban to refuse. According to Cardinal Bertrand Lagier, Martín denounced Urban to his face and the pope tried to have him killed at Subiaco, but only succeeded in wounding and robbing him. Martín returned to Avignon under the Antipope Clement VII.

== Return to Navarre ==
On 1 October 1379, Martín returned to Navarre. He was met at the border by the king and other notables. He argued the cause of Clement VII, but did not convince Charles II away from a position of neutrality. He attended the assembly of Medina del Campo in 1380–1381 and served Charles II on diplomatic missions to King John I of Castile and Count Gaston III of Foix. In 1384–1387, he was back in Avignon. In 1385, he received a papal bull confirming Pamplona's exemption from metropolitan authority. From 1387 to 1393, he resided in Pamplona, where he held a diocesan synod, set up a court of Inquisition and defended his diocese's rights in Montearagón and Guipúzcoa.

Charles II was succeeded by Charles III and in April 1388 Martín led an embassy on his behalf to King Charles VI of France to negotiate the restoration of lands confiscated from Charles II during the Hundred Years' War. Other members of the delegation include Francisco de Villaespesa and Pedro de Laxague.

In 1390, Martín secured the recognition of Clement VII by Charles III. On 10 July, there was a partial collapse in the Romanesque cathedral. Martín cooperated with the king to repair it in the Gothic style.

== Cardinal ==
On 23 July 1390, Clement VII rewarded Martín's successful diplomacy by naming him cardinal priest of San Lorenzo in Lucina. He was ceremonially robed as a cardinal in the cathedral of Pamplona on 25 September. He was popularly known as the Cardinal of Pamplona. In 1393, he returned to Avignon, where he would thereafter reside permanently. When Clement VII was succeeded by Benedict XIII later that year, Martín remained loyal to the Avignon line. In a meeting in the papal palace in Avignon on 8 July 1395, he was the only cardinal who refused to demand Benedict XIII's resignation. Howard Kaminsky notes that while Martín's "independence may have been reinforced by the fact that most of his benefices ... lay in Navarre, it was actually a personal trait," plainly in view in his interactions with Urban VI in 1378.

In 1396, Martín was succeeded as chancellor of Navarre by Francisco de Villaespesa. In 1398, he was briefly imprisoned when the inhabitants of Avignon besieged the cardinals in the palace. He afterwards moved into exile in Arles. He died at Salon in southern France on 27 October 1403 and was buried in the Chartreuse de Bonpas.

== Bibliography ==
- Álvarez Palenzuela, Vicente Ángel (2021). Documentos de Benedicto XIII referentes a la Corona de Castilla. Dykinson. hdl:10016/32581. ISBN 978-84-1377-537-1.
- Goñi Gaztambide, José (1962). "Los obispos de Pamplona del siglo XIV: El cardenal Martín de Zalba (1377–1403)". Príncipe de Viana. 23 (88): 309–400.
- Hanly, Michael (2009). "Witness to the Schism: The Writings of Honorat Bovet". In Joëlle Rollo-Koster; Thomas M. Izbicki (eds.). A Companion to the Great Western Schism (1378–1417). Brill. pp. 159–196.
- Kaminsky, Howard (1983). Simon de Cramaud and the Great Schism. Rutgers University Press. ISBN 9780813509495.
- Pavón Benito, Julia (2018). "Zalba, Martín de". Diccionario Biográfico Español. Real Academia de la Historia.
- Rollo-Koster, Joëlle (2022). The Great Western Schism, 1378–1417: Performing Legitimacy, Performing Unity. Cambridge University Press.
- Zunzunegui, José (1941). "El cardenal de Pamplona Martín de Zalba". Príncipe de Viana. 2 (2): 86–94.
