= Sancho de Larrosa =

Spanish ecclesiastic

Sancho de Larrosa (died 10 September 1142) was a Spanish ecclesiastic: a priest in the cathedral of Huesca, from 1101 to 1104 regent of the monastery of San Adrián de Sasabe and from 1122 until his death the bishop of Pamplona.

In 1141, Sancho approved the creation of a Cluniac priory at San Adrián de Vadoluengo.

Sancho was an accomplished scribe and miniaturist. As a cathedral canon in Huesca, he composed documents for Bishop Stephen (1099–1130) in an elegant Caroline book hand. As bishop, he often accompanied his signature with a pictorial signum: the head of a bearded man.

== See also ==
- Larrosa
