= Antonio Manrique Valencia =

Roman Catholic prelate (1519–1577)

Most Reverend Antonio Manrique Valencia
- Bishop of Pamplona
- Church: Catholic Church
- Diocese: Diocese of Pamplona
- In office: 1575–1577
- Predecessor: Diego Ramírez Sedeño de Fuenleal
- Successor: Pedro de Lafuente

Orders
- Consecration: 26 June 1575 by Juan Quiñones Guzman

Personal details
- Born: 1519 Zamora, Spain
- Died: 19 December 1577 (age 58) Pamplona, Spain

Antonio Manrique Valencia (1519 – 19 December 1577) was a Roman Catholic prelate who served as Bishop of Pamplona (1575–1577).

== Biography ==
Antonio Manrique Valencia was born in 1519 in Zamora, Spain. On 28 February 1575, he was appointed during the papacy of Pope Gregory XIII as Bishop of Pamplona. On 26 June 1575, he was consecrated bishop by Juan Quiñones Guzman, Bishop of Calahorra y La Calzada, with Pedro del Frago Garcés, Bishop of Jaca, and Alfonso Merchante de Valeria, Titular Bishop of Sidon, serving as co-consecrators. He served as Bishop of Pamplona until his death on 19 December 1577.

Catholic Church titles
Preceded by Diego Ramírez Sedeño de Fuenleal	Bishop of Pamplona; 1575–1577	Succeeded by Pedro de Lafuente
