= Esteban Gabriel Merino =

Spanish cardinal

His Eminence Esteban Gabriel Merino
- Cardinal, Patriarch of the West Indies
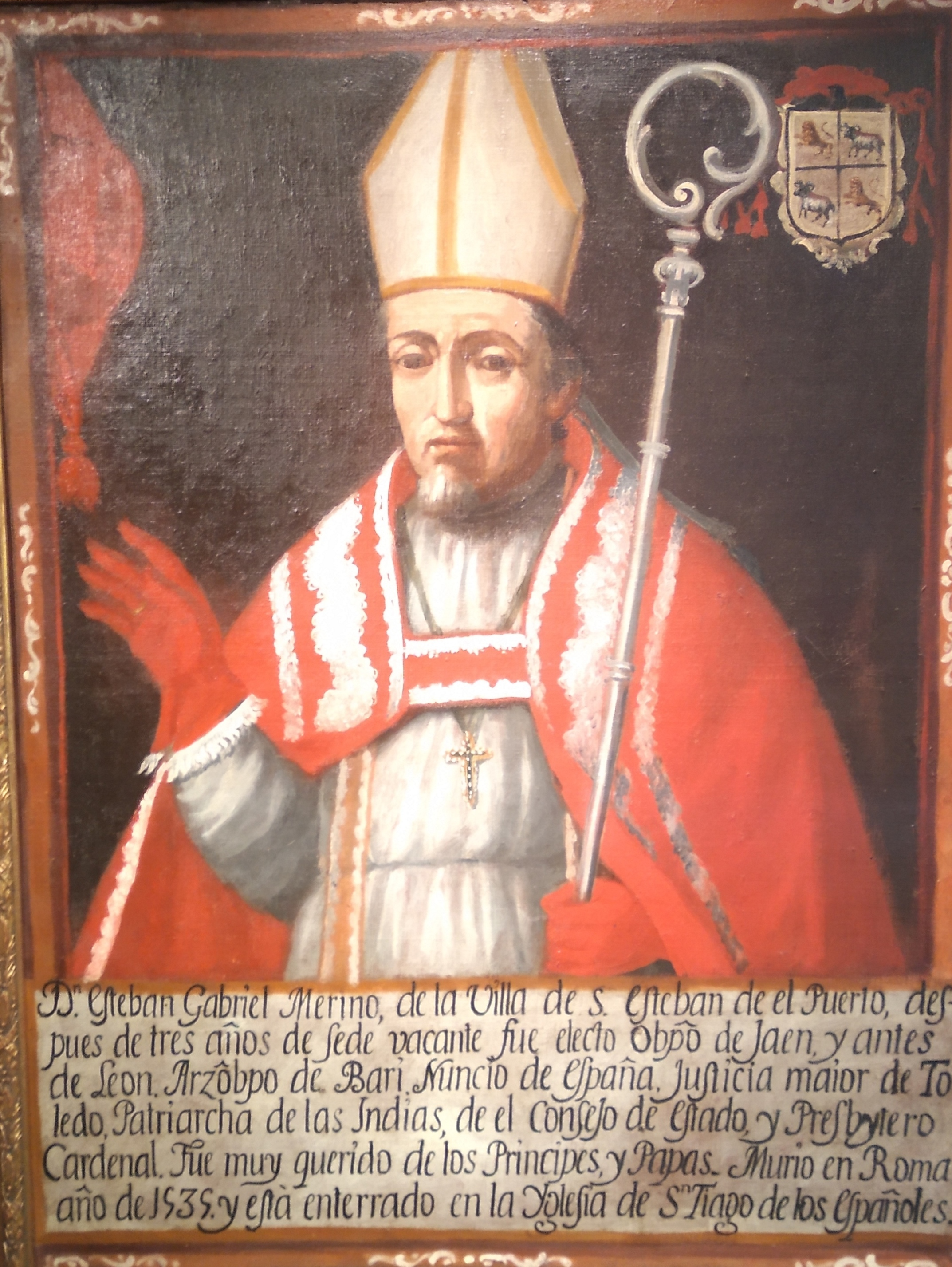
- Portrait in Jaén Cathedral
- Church: Roman Catholic
- Appointed: 2 September 1530
- Term ended: 28 July 1535
- Predecessor: Antonio de Rojas Manrique
- Successor: Fernando Niño de Guevara
- Other posts: Administrator of Bovino (1535) Bishop of Gaeta (1535) Cardinal-Priest of Ss. Giovanni e Paolo al Celio (1534–35); Bishop of Jaén (1523–35)
- Previous posts: Cardinal-Priest of San Vitale (1533–34); Bishop of León (1516–23); Archbishop of Bari (1513–30)

Orders
- Consecration: 1514
- Created cardinal: 21 February 1533 by Pope Clement VII
- Rank: Cardinal-Priest

Personal details
- Born: c. 1472 Santisteban del Puerto
- Died: 28 July 1535 (aged c. 63) Rome, Papal States
- Buried: Santa Maria in Monserrato degli Spagnoli

Esteban Gabriel Merino (c. 1472 – 28 July 1535) was a Spanish Roman Catholic bishop and cardinal.

== Biography ==
Merino was born in Santisteban del Puerto, the son of Alonso Merino and Mayor de Amorcuende, a family of the lowest condition. His father died when he was very young. He went to Rome with a priest who was a family friend.

He entered the household of Cardinal Ascanio Sforza, initially occupying minor positions. He later joined the ecclesiastical estate after obtaining a dispensation from Pope Alexander VI for having caused the death of a cleric while playing with a sword. In spring 1500, during the Italian War of 1499–1504, he was in Lombardy with Cardinal Sforza during the French invasion. He ended up in prison in Bourges with Cardinal Sforza; while there, he learned French. He was freed on January 3, 1502, then traveled to Rome to act as Cardinal Sforza's procurator for dealing with the Fugger Bank. He was a conclavist for Cardinal Sforza at the papal conclave of September 1503 that elected Pope Pius III and at the papal conclave of October 1503 that elected Pope Julius II. He became the cardinal's secretary around this time. In 1504, he was made a protonotary apostolic.

Following Cardinal Sforza's death on May 28, 1505, he received the patronage of Cardinal Francesco Alidosi and of Pope Julius II who sent him in August 1506 to the Republic of Florence to seek military assistance against Bologna. He was present at Nepi along with Cardinals Alidosi and Francesco Soderini for the meeting of Pope Julius II with the Florentine envoy, Niccolò Machiavelli. A month later, the pope despatched him to meet with Ferdinand II of Aragon. The pope then made him canon and archdeacon of Baeza, and made him his chamberlain and nuncio. In July 1507, he again met Ferdinand II of Aragon and negotiated the League of Cambrai against the Republic of Venice. In summer 1509, he accompanied Cardinal Alidosi on a diplomatic mission to Louis XII of France in Milan, and then accompanied Cardinal Alidosi on his legation to Bologna. Returning to Rome, he had a letter addressed from Cardinal Alidosi to the Apostolic Dataria, dated February 24, 1511, that secured for Merino the post of apostolic scriptor.

After the death of Cardinal Alidosi and Pope Julius II, he entered the service of Cardinal Marco Cornaro. He was Cardinal Cornaro's conclavist at the papal conclave of 1513 that elected Pope Leo X. The new pope took Merino into the papal household and tried (unsuccessfully) to make him Bishop of Leiden.

On the pope's initiative, he was elected Archbishop of Bari on May 9, 1513, while retaining the office of apostolic scriptor. He attended all meetings of the Fifth Council of the Lateran (1512–17) following his elevation to the episcopate. On May 1, 1514, he was named palatine count. He generally ruled the archdiocese of Bari through a vicar general, Luis de Mexia, visiting the archdiocese for the first time on May 1, 1514.

Towards the end of 1514, he was ordained as a priest and then consecrated as a bishop.

On December 17, 1516, he was named Bishop of León, while retaining the archdiocese of Bari. He occupied the see until June 12, 1523.

In 1517, Merino helped broker a deal with the pope's enemy Cardinal Alfonso Petrucci. He was also instrumental in rallying Siena to the papal cause during the War of Urbino.

In March 1520, he left for a visit of the Diocese of León, thus beginning an unplanned 13-year absence from the papal court. During the Revolt of the Comuneros, he successfully kept León loyal to Charles I of Spain. He also played a role in maintaining the loyalty of Murcia, Úbeda and Baeza.

In 1522, he was nuncio to Francis I of France, with orders to travel to the Kingdom of England if necessary. His mission was initially to negotiate peace between Francis I of France and Charles V, Holy Roman Emperor. He later accompanied Pope Adrian VI on his trip from Vitoria to Tortosa.

On June 12, 1523, Charles I of Spain named him Bishop of Jaén, with permission to retain the see of Bari (which he did until September 2, 1530). During the Italian War of 1521–1526, Pope Adrian VI in 1523 allied with imperial forces when threatened with another French invasion.

After Pope Adrian VI died on September 14, 1523, Merino's nunciature ended and he passed into the service of the Holy Roman Emperor. From November 1523 to May 1524, he was the principal negotiator between Charles V and Francis I. In 1526, the emperor admitted the archbishop to his Council of State. He was later named supplier general of the armada that was designed to take the emperor to Italy. He left Barcelona with the emperor on August 2, 1529, disembarking in Genoa ten days later. On October 8, 1529, he was named imperial ambassador to the Holy See, with orders to speed the imperial coronation, prepare Italy for Spanish invasion, and to obtain support for Ferdinand of Austria in his fight against the Ottoman Empire. On November 5, 1529, he entered Bologna with the emperor, where the coronation took place on February 24, 1530. In March 1530, he accompanied the emperor to Germany.

On September 2, 1530, he was named Patriarch of the West Indies. He spent much of 1531 ill with dropsy. In spring 1532, he settled with the imperial court at Regensburg, the headquarters of forces arrayed against the Ottoman Empire; he was the general supplier of the enterprise. During the second interview with Pope Clement VII at Bologna, he was one of three ministers tasked with dealing with the religious situation in Germany, along with Cardinals Alessandro Farnese, and Paolo Emilio Cesi.

At the request of the emperor, Pope Clement VII made him a cardinal priest in the consistory of February 21, 1533. He received the red hat and the titular church of San Vitale on March 3, 1533.

He generally represented Spanish interests in the College of Cardinals, replacing Cardinal García de Loaysa, who had returned to Spain. In that capacity, his main goals were: (1) preventing the divorce of Henry VIII of England and Catherine of Aragon; and (2) impeding the meeting of Pope Clement VII and Francis I of France for the wedding of Henry, Duke of Orléans and Catherine de' Medici. He succeeded in the first but failed in the second task. He also failed in his ambition to become Archbishop of Toledo or pope.

On September 5, 1534, he opted for the titular church of Santi Giovanni e Paolo. He participated in the papal conclave of 1534 that elected Pope Paul III.

He was named Bishop of Gaeta on February 17, 1535, and administrator of the see of Bovino on April 15, 1535.

He died in Rome, at his palace in piazza di Pasquino, on July 28, 1535. He was initially buried in Nostra Signora del Sacro Cuore. His remains were later transferred to Santa Maria in Monserrato degli Spagnoli.

Catholic Church titles
| Preceded by Giovanni Giacomo Castiglione | Archbishop of Bari; 1513–1516 | Succeeded by Girolamo Grimaldi |
| Preceded by Luigi d'Aragona | Bishop of León; 1516–1523 | Succeeded by Pedro Manuel |
| Preceded by Alonso Suárez de la Fuente del Sauce | Bishop of Jaén; 1523–1535 | Succeeded by Alessandro Farnese (iuniore) |
| Preceded by Antonio de Rojas Manrique | Patriarch of West Indies; 1530–1535 | Succeeded by Fernando Niño de Guevara |
| Preceded by Marino Grimani | Cardinal-Priest of San Vitale; 1533–1534 | Succeeded by St. John Fisher |
| Preceded by Willem van Enckenvoirt | Cardinal-Priest of Santi Giovanni e Paolo; 1534–1535 | Succeeded by Afonso de Portugal |
| Preceded by Benedetto de Accolti (iuniore) | Administrator of Bovino; 1535 | Succeeded by Alfonso Oliva |
