= Villaescusa de Haro =

Villaescusa de Haro, Spain
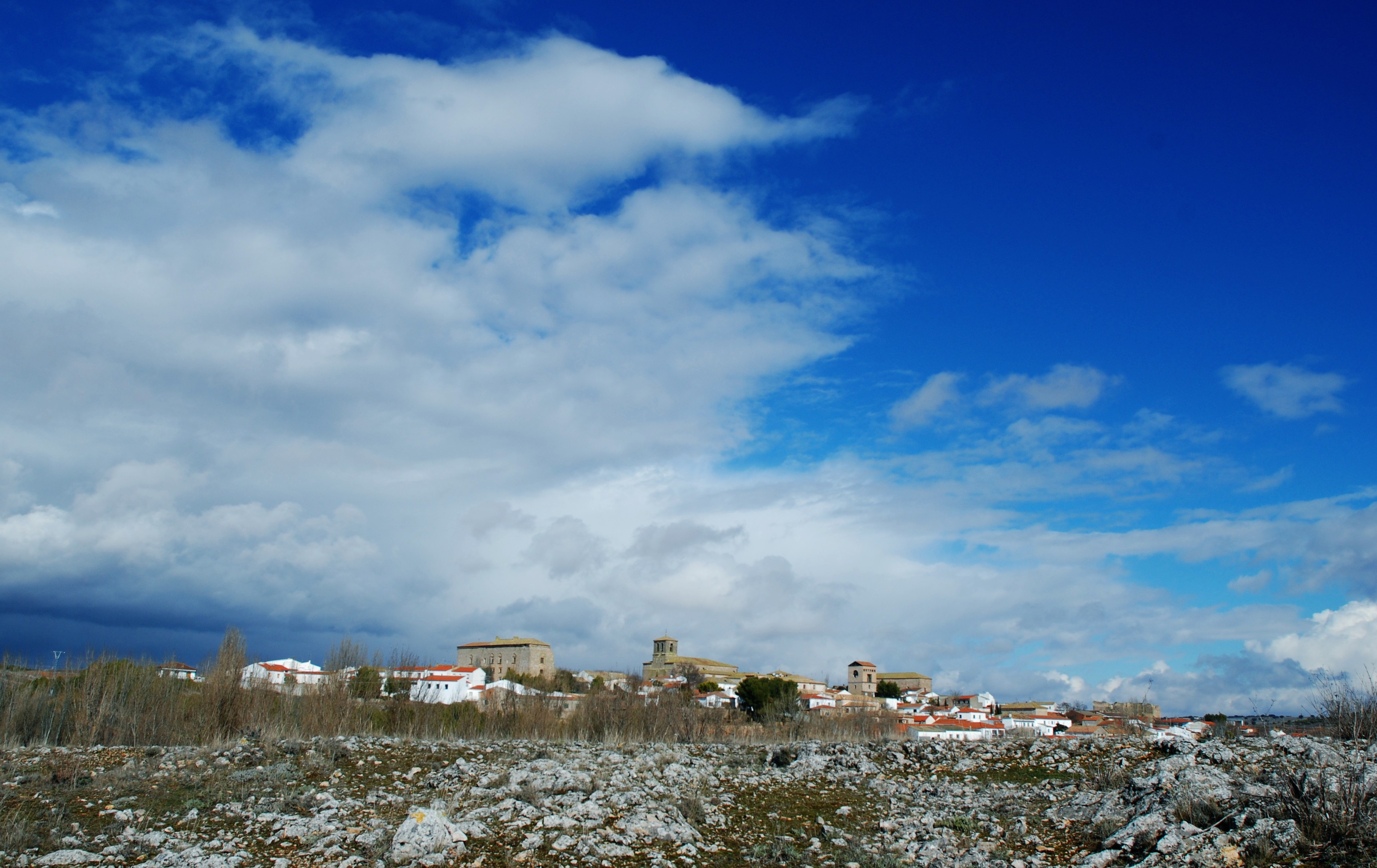

- Location within Spain Location within Castilla-La Mancha
- Coordinates: 39°36′N 2°40′W
- Country: Spain
- Autonomous community: Castile-La Mancha
- Province: Cuenca
- Municipality: Villaescusa de Haro

Area
  - Total: 93 km^{2} (36 sq mi)

Population (2025-01-01)
  - Total: 480
  - Density: 5.2/km^{2} (13/sq mi)
- Time zone: UTC+1 (CET)
  - Summer (DST): UTC+2 (CEST)

Villaescusa de Haro is a municipality located in the province of Cuenca, Castile-La Mancha, Spain. According to the 2004 census (INE), the municipality has a population of 585 inhabitants.
