= Bernardo de Sandoval y Rojas =

Catholic cardinal and inquisitor (1546–1618)

His Eminence Bernardo de Sandoval y Rojas
- Cardinal, Archbishop of Toledo; Primate of Spain
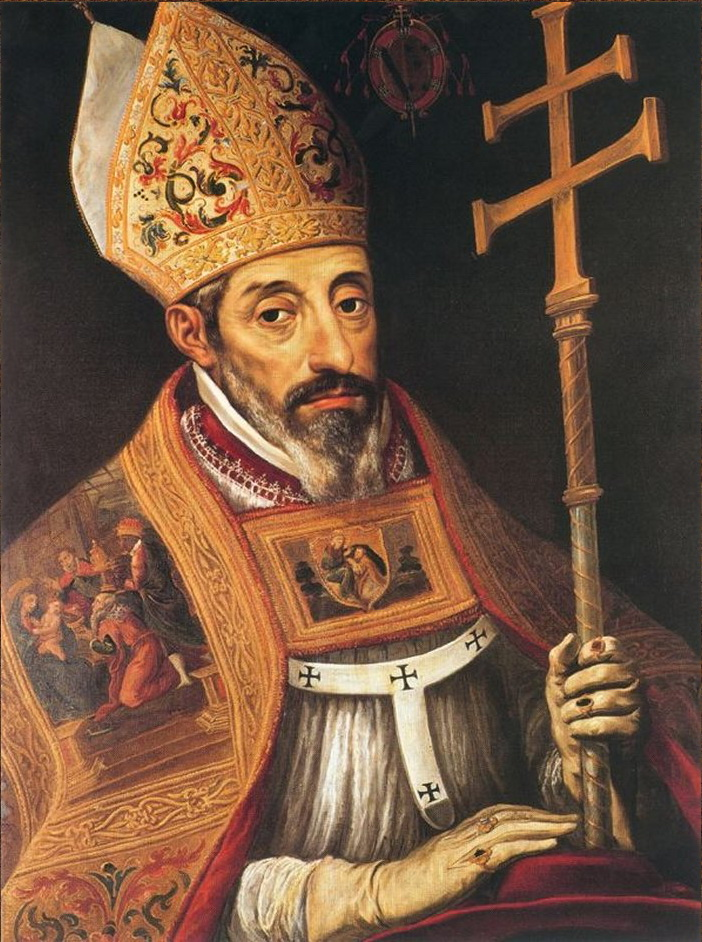
- Bernardo de Sandoval y Rojas (1619) by Luis Tristán, Cathedral of Toledo
- Church: Roman Catholic
- Archdiocese: Toledo
- Appointed: 19 April 1599
- Term ended: 7 December 1618
- Predecessor: García Loaysa y Girón
- Successor: Ferdinand of Austria
- Other post: Cardinal-Priest of Sant'Anastasia (1601–18)
- Previous posts: Bishop of Jaén (1596–99); Bishop of Pamplona (1588–96); Bishop of Ciudad Rodrigo (1586–88)

Orders
- Consecration: 20 April 1586 by Rodrigo de Castro Osorio
- Created cardinal: 3 March 1599 by Pope Clement VIII
- Rank: Cardinal-Priest

Personal details
- Born: 20 April 1546 Aranda de Duero, Crown of Castile
- Died: 7 December 1618 (aged 72) Madrid, Crown of Castile
- Buried: Toledo Cathedral

Bernardo de Sandoval y Rojas (20 April 1546 – 7 December 1618) was a Spanish bishop and cardinal who was Grand Inquisitor of Spain from 1608 to 1618.

== Biography ==
Bernardo de Sandoval y Rojas was born in Aranda de Duero on 20 April 1546, the son of Hernando de Rojas y Sandoval and Maria Chacon Guevara. He was the second oldest of nine siblings. He was the uncle of Francisco Gómez de Sandoval, 1st Duke of Lerma.

His uncle, Cristóbal de Rojas y Sandoval, Bishop of Oviedo granted him the tonsure on 13 November 1555.

He attended the University of Alcalá, where he studied under Ambrosio Morales and received his bachillerato on 18 June 1566; his licentiate on 25 October 1567 and a doctorate in arts on 3 November 1567. He became a canon of Seville Cathedral on 4 June 1574. His uncle, now Archbishop of Seville, made him subdeacon of El Escorial on 5 June 1576. During this period, he also attended the University of Salamanca, receiving a licentiate in theology on 24 July 1576.

In 1586, Philip II of Spain nominated him to be Bishop of Ciudad Rodrigo and he was elected bishop by the cathedral chapter of Ciudad Rodrigo on 8 January 1586. He was consecrated by Cardinal Rodrigo de Castro Osorio, Archbishop of Seville, on 20 April 1586. He was translated to the see of Pamplona on 16 March 1588. He became Bishop of Jaén on 29 April 1596.

On 3 March 1599 Pope Clement VIII created him a cardinal priest. He became Archbishop of Toledo on 19 April 1599. He received his galero on 26 February 1601, at which time he was granted the titular church of Santa Anastasia. He did not participate in the two conclaves of 1605.

He was the Grand Inquisitor of Spain from 1608 until his death in 1618.

He was the patron of many famous authors, including Miguel de Cervantes, Francisco de Quevedo, Lope de Vega, Luis de León, and Luis de Góngora.

He died suddenly in Madrid on 7 December 1618. He is buried in the Cathedral of Toledo.

Catholic Church titles
| Preceded by Pedro Vélez Guevara | Bishop of Ciudad Rodrigo; 1586–1588 | Succeeded by Pedro Maldonado |
| Preceded by Pedro de Lafuente | Bishop of Pamplona; 1588–1596 | Succeeded by Antonio Zapata y Cisneros |
| Preceded by Francisco Sarmiento Mendoza | Bishop of Jaén; 1596–1599 | Succeeded by Sancho Dávila Toledo |
| Preceded by García Loaysa y Girón | Archbishop of Toledo; 1599–1618 | Succeeded by Cardinal-Infante Ferdinand of Austria |
| Preceded by Juan Bautista de Acevedo | Grand Inquisitor of Spain; 1608–1618 | Succeeded by Luis de Aliaga Martínez |
