= Pedro Pacheco de Villena =

Spanish cardinal (1488–1560)

His Eminence Pedro Pacheco de Villena
- Bishop of Sigüenza
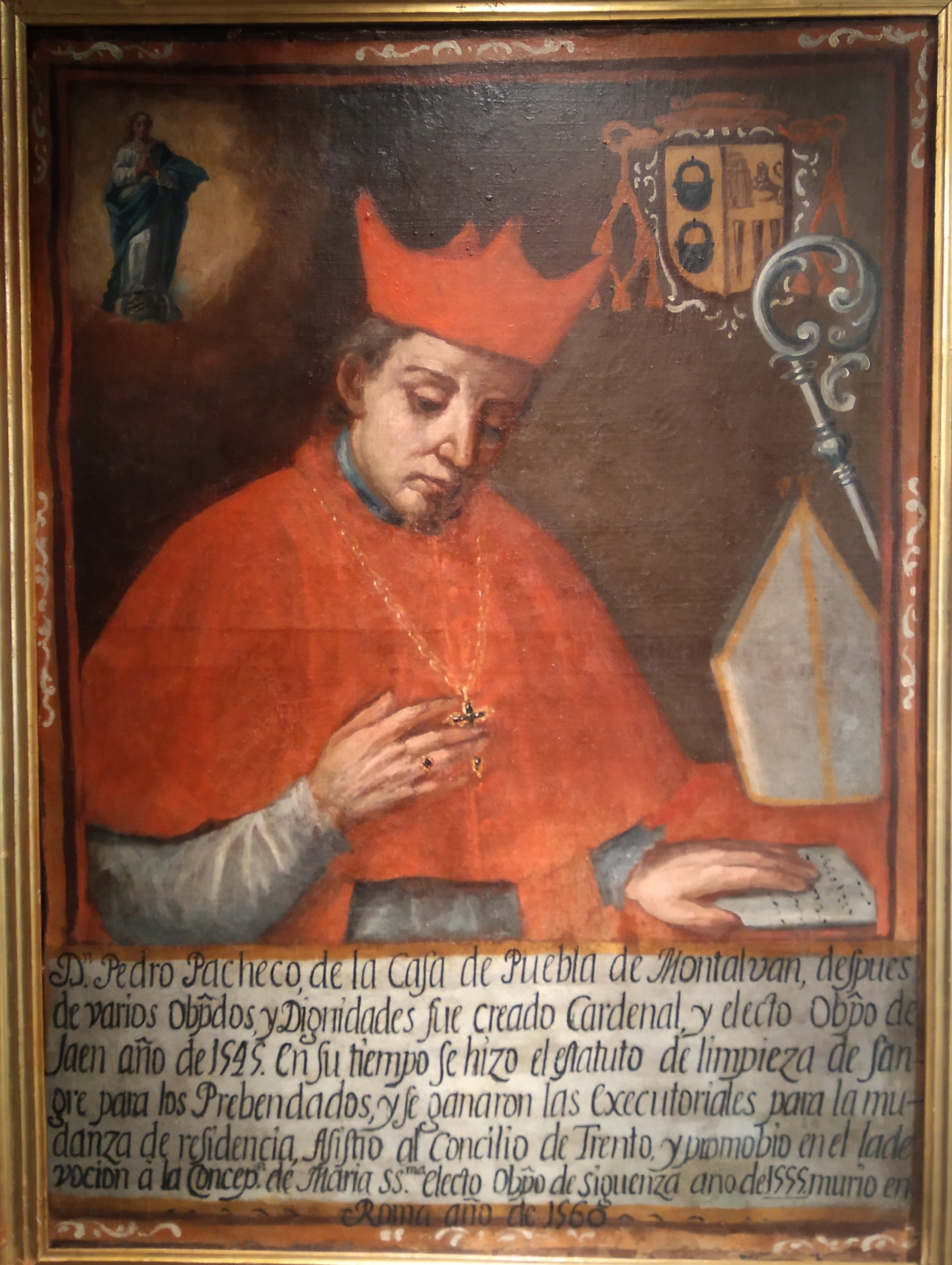
- Portrait of Cardinal Pacheco, unknown date
- Church: Catholic Church
- Diocese: Sigüenza
- Appointed: 30 Apr 1554
- Term ended: 5 Mar 1560
- Predecessor: Fernando Niño
- Successor: Francisco Manrique de Lara
- Other posts: Cardinal-Bishop of Albano (1557-1560)
- Previous posts: See list: Bishop of Mondoñedo (1532–1537); Bishop of Ciudad Rodrigo (1537-1539); Bishop of Pamplona (1539-1545); Bishop of Jaén (1545-1554); Viceroy of Naples (1553-1556)

Orders
- Consecration: 6 September 1532
- Created cardinal: 16 December 1545 by Pope Paul III
- Rank: Cardinal-Bishop

Personal details
- Born: 29 June 1488 La Puebla de Montalbán, Spain
- Died: 5 March 1560 (aged 71) Rome, Papal States

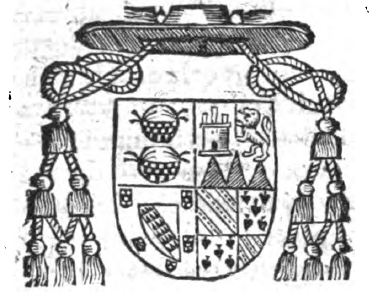
Coat of arms of Cardinal Pacheco

Pedro Pacheco de Villena (29 June 1488 – 5 March 1560), also known as Pedro Pacheco Ladrón de Guevara, was a Spanish cardinal and viceroy of Naples. In Italian his name is spelled Pietro Pacecco. His nephew Francisco Pacheco de Toledo was also a cardinal.

== Biography ==
Pedro Pacheco de Villena was the son of Alfonso Tellez Giron, son of Martin Vazquez de Acuña and Maria Teresa Giron, heiress of her House. His uncle was Marques de Villena. He studied at Salamanca. He was a chamberlain of Pope Alexander VI and followed him to Rome in 1522. He worked in several offices for the Roman Curia, notably as referendary at the Supreme Tribunal of the Apostolic Signatura. He was Dean of Santiago Cathedral and Archdeacon of Valpuesta. Charles V made him visitor to the chancellery of Valladolid and of Granada.

He was appointed bishop of Mondoñedo (Mindionensis) in Galicia and was confirmed by Pope Paul III (Farnese) on 6 September 1532, and was later translated to the diocese of Ciudad Rodrigo, with the consent of Pope Paul given in Consistory on 11 April 1537.

He was named Bishop of Pamplona by the Emperor, an appointment confirmed by Pope Paul III in consistory on 21 May 1539. Pacheco took possession of his diocese by proxy of Dr. Martinez y Gaspar Lizano on 10 July 1539. He finally appeared personally to be enthroned on 14 March 1540. He carried out a visitation of the cathedral chapter of Pamplona. After a year of opposition and obfuscation, an agreement between the bishop and canons was reached on 14 April 1541, for the enforcement of the regulation of the canons. In August 1544, the bishop convoked a synod for his diocese, the thirteenth in the diocese's history. He established the custom of holding annual processions on Corpus Christi and its Octave, Easter day, the Feast of S. Augustine and the Feast of S. Francis. At the conclusion of the synod, the Emperor summoned Pacheco to service at Court.

The Emperor appointed him Bishop of Jaén, but not for the benefit of the people of that diocese. The Emperor wanted Bishop Pacheco as his agent at the Papal Court. The new diocese gave Pacheco the status and the financial resources to carry out his mission in Rome. Jaen would be ruled by a governor and provisor in the name of the bishop. The bishop turned over the administration of his diocese to a vicar, Gabriel de Guevara, on 3 January 1545.

Later, on 30 April 1554, he became Bishop of Sigüenza (Segontia), a post he held until his death in 1560.

He also took part in the council of Trent and was the first to address the issue of the Immaculate Conception of the Virgin Mary.

Bishop Pedro Pacheco de Villena was made a cardinal by Pope Paul III at the consistory of 16 December 1545.

He took part in the 1549–50 conclave which elected Cardinal Giovanni Maria Ciocchi del Monte as Pope Julius III.

In 1553 Cardinal Pacheco was made viceroy of Naples by Charles V. He served from 1553 to 1555, until the election of Pope Paul IV (Carafa).

He did not take part in the first conclave of 1555 which elected Cardinal Marcello Cervini as pope Marcellus II. He was present, however, at the second conclave of 1555 which elected Gian Pietro Carafa of Naples as pope Paul IV,

On 20 September 1557, he opted for the Order of Cardinal Bishops and was promoted to the See of Albano, which had become vacant with the promotion of Cardinal Francesco Pisano to the See of Tusculum. It is said that Pope Paul IV granted his request while passing over that of Cardinal Georges d'Armagnac, who was senior to Cardinal Pacheco by a year. Unfortunately, during his administration of the diocese, the territory of Albano was devastated by armies for two years running during the war between Pope Paul IV (who had once been Bishop of Albano) and the Spanish Imperial forces under the command of Fernando of Toledo, Duque de Alba.

He took part in the conclave of 1559 which elected Cardinal Giovanni Angelo de' Medici as pope Pius IV. In the same year he was made one of the six Cardinal Inquisitors of the tribunal of the Universal and Roman Inquisition in Rome by Pius IV.

He died in his palazzo in Rome, suddenly (subito ex accidenti), on 5 March 1560. He was buried in the Church of S. Maria in Aracoeli on 13 March 1560. His body was later transferred to the Puebla de Montalban, where it was interred in the Convent of the Franciscans (S. Chiara), which he had founded.

== Sources ==
- Angel Martín González, El cardenal don Pedro Pacheco, obispo de Jaén, en el Concilio de Trento : (un prelado que personificó la política imperial de Carlos V) (Jaén : Instituto de Estudios Giennenses, Excma. Diputación Provincial, 1974).
