= Antonio de Rojas Manrique =

Roman Catholic prelate (??–1527)

Most Reverend Antonio de Rojas Manrique
- Patriarch of the West Indies
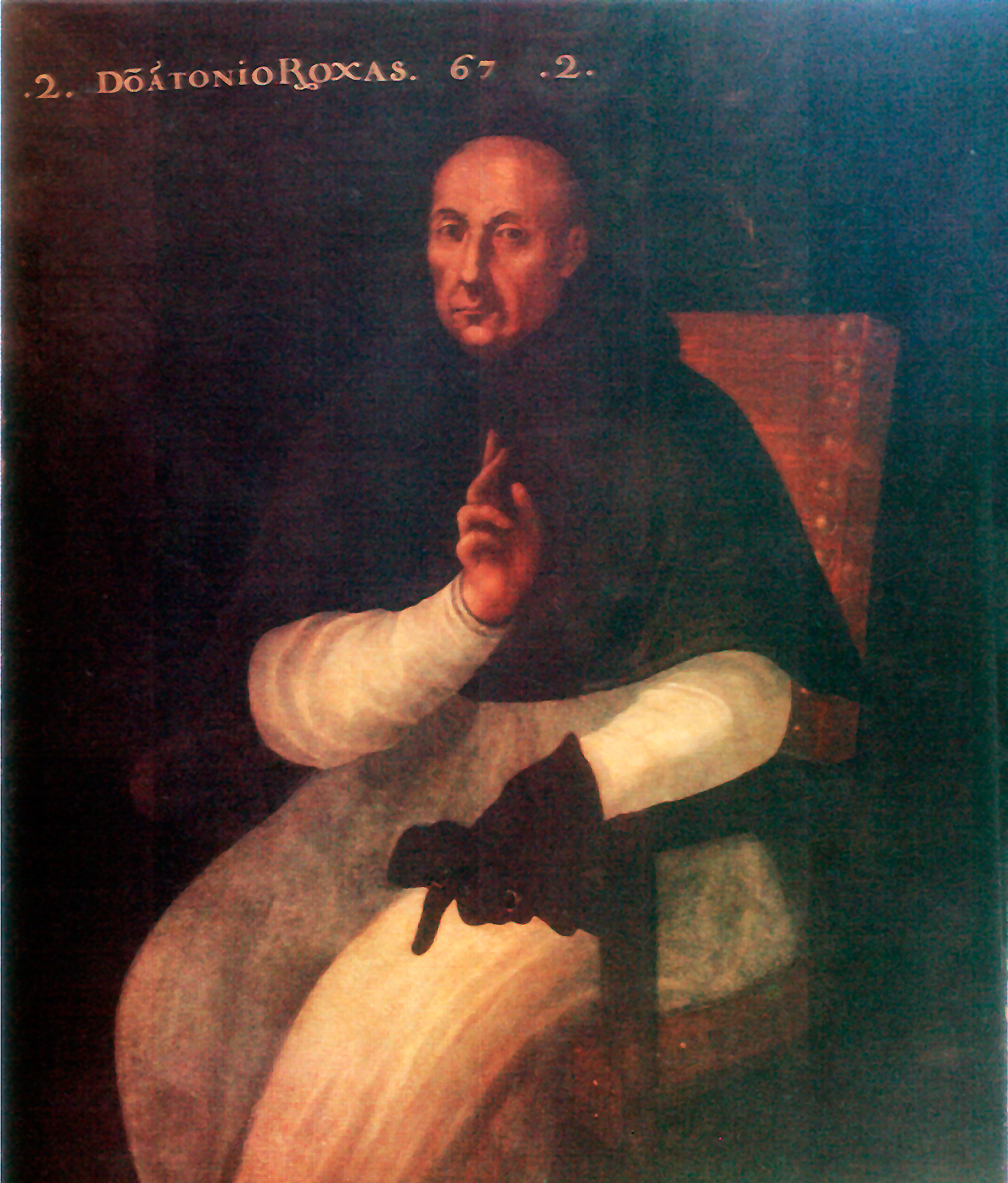
- Church: Catholic Church
- Diocese: Bishop of Burgos
- In office: 1524–1527
- Predecessor: None
- Successor: Esteban Gabriel Merino
- Previous posts: Bishop of Mallorca (1496–1507); Archbishop of Granada (1507–1524); Bishop of Palencia (1524–1525); Bishop of Burgos (1525–1527)

Personal details
- Died: 27 June 1527 Burgos, Spain

Antonio de Rojas Manrique (died 27 June 1527) was a Roman Catholic prelate who served as Patriarch of the West Indies (1524–1527), Bishop of Burgos (1525–1527), Bishop of Palencia (1524–1525), Archbishop of Granada (1507–1524), Bishop of Mallorca (1496–1507), and President of the Council of Castile (1519–1524).

== Biography ==
In 1496, Antonio de Rojas Manrique was selected by the King of Spain and confirmed by Pope Alexander VI as Bishop of Mallorca. He was one of the three ambassadors to England that left on 26 August 1501 to accompany princess Catherine of Aragon on her marriage to Arthur, Prince of Wales. The others were Diego Fernández de Córdoba y Mendoza, 3rd Count of Cabra, and Alonso de Fonseca, archbishop of Santiago de Compostela. In 1507, he was appointed by Pope Julius II as Archbishop of Granada. In 1524, he was appointed by Pope Clement VII as Bishop of Palencia and the first Patriarch of the West Indies. On 3 July 1525, he was appointed by Pope Clement VII as Bishop of Burgos. He served as Bishop of Burgos and Patriarch of West Indies until his death on 27 June 1527.

== External links and additional sources ==
- Cheney, David M. "Diocese of Mallorca". Catholic-Hierarchy.org. (for Chronology of Bishops) ^{[self-published]}
- Chow, Gabriel. "Diocese of Mallorca (Spain)". GCatholic.org. (for Chronology of Bishops) ^{[self-published]}
- Cheney, David M. "Archdiocese of Granada". Catholic-Hierarchy.org. (for Chronology of Bishops) ^{[self-published]}
- Chow, Gabriel. "Metropolitan Archdiocese of Granada(Spain)". GCatholic.org. (for Chronology of Bishops) ^{[self-published]}
- Cheney, David M. "Diocese of Palencia". Catholic-Hierarchy.org. (for Chronology of Bishops) ^{[self-published]}
- Chow, Gabriel. "Diocese of Palencia (Spain)". GCatholic.org. (for Chronology of Bishops) ^{[self-published]}
- Cheney, David M. "Archdiocese of Burgos". Catholic-Hierarchy.org. (for Chronology of Bishops) ^{[self-published]}
- Chow, Gabriel. "Metropolitan Archdiocese of Burgos (Spain)". GCatholic.org. (for Chronology of Bishops) ^{[self-published]}
- Cheney, David M. "Patriarchate of West Indies". Catholic-Hierarchy.org. (for Chronology of Bishops) ^{[self-published]}
- Chow, Gabriel. "Titular Patriarchal See of Indias Occidentales (Spain)". GCatholic.org. (for Chronology of Bishops) ^{[self-published]}

Catholic Church titles
Preceded by Guillermo Ramón de Moncada	Bishop of Mallorca; 1496–1507	Succeeded by Diego Ribera de Toledo
Preceded by Hernando de Talavera	Archbishop of Granada; 1507–1524	Succeeded by Francisco Herrera Ruesta
Preceded by Pedro Ruiz de la Mota	Bishop of Palencia; 1524–1525	Succeeded by Pedro Gómez Sarmiento de Villandrando
Preceded by Juan Rodríguez de Fonseca	Bishop of Burgos; 1525–1527	Succeeded by Íñigo López de Mendoza y Zúñiga
Preceded by None	Patriarch of the West Indies; 1524–1527	Succeeded by Esteban Gabriel Merino
