= Patriarchate of the West Indies =

Latin Catholic titular see in Spain

Patriarchate of West Indies Patriarchatus Indiarum Occidentalium

Location
- Country: Spain
- Territory: West Indies; Caribbean

Information
- Denomination: Catholic Church
- Sui iuris church: Latin Church
- Rite: Roman Rite
- Established: 11 May 1524

Current leadership
- Pope: Leo XIV
- Patriarch: Sede vacante

The Patriarchate of the West Indies (Latin: Patriarchatus Indiarum Occidentalium, Spanish: Patriarcado de las Indias Occidentales) is a patriarchate of the Catholic Church with titular jurisdiction over the Latin Church in Spanish America. It was established in 1524 and held by the Military Vicar of Spain from the creation of that office in 1705. It has been vacant since the death of the last patriarch in 1963. A similar position held has been the "Primate of the Indies", which is given to the head of the Roman Catholic Archdiocese of Santo Domingo.

== History ==
=== Jurisdictional patriarchate attempts ===
King Ferdinand V of Castile asked Pope Leo X to establish a patriarchate for the ecclesiastical government of the American territories discovered by the Spaniards. The Holy See was not keen to accept the establishment of such an autonomous Spanish American church and, on 11 May 1524, Clement VII agreed to create it but only as honorific, without jurisdiction and without clergy. In addition, the patriarch was banned from actually residing in the Americas.

Antonio de Rojas, archbishop of Granada and bishop of Palencia, was the first patriarch. The following patriarchs were the bishop of Jaén, Esteban Gabriel Merino (1530–1535) and the archbishop of Granada, Fernando Niño y Zapata (1546–1552). After Niño's death, the office remained vacant because Philip II, against the Holy See policy, wished an actual jurisdictional patriarchate. Finally, the king agreed in 1591 to propose the archbishop of Mexico City (but who was actually resident in Madrid as president of the Council of the Indies), Pedro Moya de Contreras. However, the new patriarch died before he could take the oath of his new office.

In 1602, Philip III abandoned the idea of a jurisdictional patriarchate and used it as an honorific title for noble clergymen. Philip III gave the honorific title to Pedro Manso de Zuñiga y Sola, brother of Francisco Manso de Zuñiga y Sola.

=== Merger with the Spanish Military Vicariate ===
In 1705, Pope Clement XI named Patriarch Carlos de Borja Centellas the Military Vicar (General) of the Spanish Armies. Beginning in 1736, Pope Clement XII merged the office of vicar general of the Spanish Armies with the Patriarchate of the West Indies pro tempore et ad septennium, that is, "temporarily for seven years", and added to those titles the Royal Palace's Chaplaincy in 1741.

Clement XIII decreed the merger of the patriarchate and the military vicariate in 1762. By 1816, in recognition of the Roman Catholic Archdiocese of Santo Domingo being the first established in the Western Hemisphere, Pope Pius VII declared that its resident archbishop can use the title "Primate of the Indies."

=== Last incumbent and contemporary status ===
In 1933, Patriarch Ramón Pérez Rodríguez was appointed bishop of Cádiz and Ceuta. The previous year, the Spanish republican government had abolished the military vicariate. Thus, the patriarchate remained vacant.

During the Spanish Civil War, the Nationalists organized a religious military service and the Holy See appointed Cardinal Isidro Gomá, the archbishop of Toledo, as interim pontifical delegate. In 1940, Gomá died and the auxiliary bishop Gregorio Modrego was commissioned with the deceased cardinal's military duties. In 1942, Modrego was appointed bishop of Barcelona. During all that time, the patriarchate remained vacant.

In 1946, the bishop of Madrid, Leopoldo Eijo y Garay, was appointed as the patriarch of the West Indies, but without the military ordinariate, which was established once more as a military archbishopric in 1950, this time without any association with the patriarch's title.

Since Eijo's death, this titular patriarchate has remained vacant; and in 1954, the Concordat between the Dominican Republic and the Vatican ratified the use of Santo Domingo's archbishop being granted the position of "Primate of the Indies."

== List of patriarchs of the West Indies ==
- Antonio de Rojas Manrique (1524 – 27 Jun 1527 Died)
- Esteban Gabriel Merino (2 Sep 1530 – 28 Jul 1535 Died)
- Fernando Niño de Guevara (patriarch) (8 Oct 1546 – 16 Sep 1552 Died)
  - Antonio de Fonseca, O.S.A. (1558 – Did Not Take Effect)
  - Pedro Moya de Contreras (15 Jan 1591 – 7 Dec 1591 Died) Archbishop of Mexico City and President of the Council of the Indies, not installed
- Juan Guzmán (patriarch) (15 Nov 1602 – 1605 Died)
- Juan Bautista Acevedo Muñoz (16 Jan 1606 – 8 Jun 1608 Died)
- Pedro Manso (10 Nov 1608 Appointed – )
- Diego Guzmán de Haros (14 Mar 1616 – 15 Sep 1625 Confirmed, Archbishop of Sevilla)
- Andrés Pacheco (6 Oct 1625 – 7 Apr 1626 Died)
- Alfonso Pérez de Guzmán (17 May 1627 – 22 Dec 1670 Retired)
- Antonio Manrique de Guzmán (22 Dec 1670 – 26 Feb 1679 Died)
- Antonio de Benavides y Bazán (8 May 1679 – 22 Jan 1691 Died)
- Pedro Portocarrero y Guzmán (12 Nov 1691 – 1708 Died)
- Carlos Borja Centellas y Ponce de León (3 Oct 1708 – 8 Aug 1733 Died)
- Álvaro Eugenio de Mendoza Caamaño y Sotomayor (20 Jan 1734 – 23 Jan 1761 Died)
- Buenaventura Córdoba Espinosa de la Cerda (6 April 1761 – 6 May 1777 Died)
- Francisco Javier Delgado y Venegas (30 Mar 1778 – 10 Dec 1781 Died)
- Cayetano Adsor Paredes (25 Feb 1782 – 12 Jul 1782 Died)
- Manuel Buenaventura Figueroa Barrero (16 Dec 1782 – 3 Apr 1783 Died)
- Antonio Sentmenat y Castellá (25 Jun 1784 – 14 Apr 1806 Died)
- Ramón José de Arce (26 Aug 1806 – 7 Jul 1815 Retired)
- Francisco Antonio Cebrián y Valdá (10 Jul 1815 – 10 Feb 1820 Died)
- Antonio Allué y Sesse (8 Jan 1821 – 1842 Died)
- Antonio Posada Rubín de Celis (17 Dec 1847 – 22 Nov 1851 Died)
- Tomás Iglesias y Bárcones (27 Sep 1852 – 9 May 1874 Died)
- Francisco de Paula Benavides y Navarrete, O.S. (5 Jul 1875 – 13 May 1881 Appointed, Archbishop of Zaragoza)
- José Moreno y Mazón (18 Nov 1881 – 27 Mar 1885 Appointed, Archbishop of Granada)
- Zeferino González y Díaz Tuñón (1885–1886)
- Miguel Payá y Rico (7 Jun 1886 – 25 Dec 1891 Died)
- Antolín Monescillo y Viso (11 July 1892 – 11 August 1897 Died)
- Bl. Ciriaco María Sancha y Hervás (24 Mar 1898 – 26 Feb 1909 Died)
- Gregorio Maria Aguirre y Garcia, O.F.M. (29 Apr 1909 – 10 Oct 1913 Died)
- Victoriano Guisasola y Menéndez (1914–1920)
- Jaime Cardona y Tur (9 Dec 1920 – 4 Jan 1923 Died)
- Julián de Diego y García Alcolea (27 Jul 1923 – 8 Oct 1925 Appointed, Archbishop of Santiago de Compostela)
- Francisco Muñoz e Izquierdo (14 Dec 1925 – 12 Apr 1930 Died)
- Ramón Pérez y Rodríguez (30 Jun 1930 – 28 Jan 1937 Died)
- Leopoldo Eijo y Garay (21 Jul 1946 – 31 Aug 1963 Died)

== See also ==
- Patriarch of the East Indies
- Grand Inquisitor
- Patriarchs
