= Fernando Niño (patriarch) =

Spanish Roman Catholic prelate (died 1552)

Most Reverend Fernando Niño y Zapata
- Patriarch of West Indies
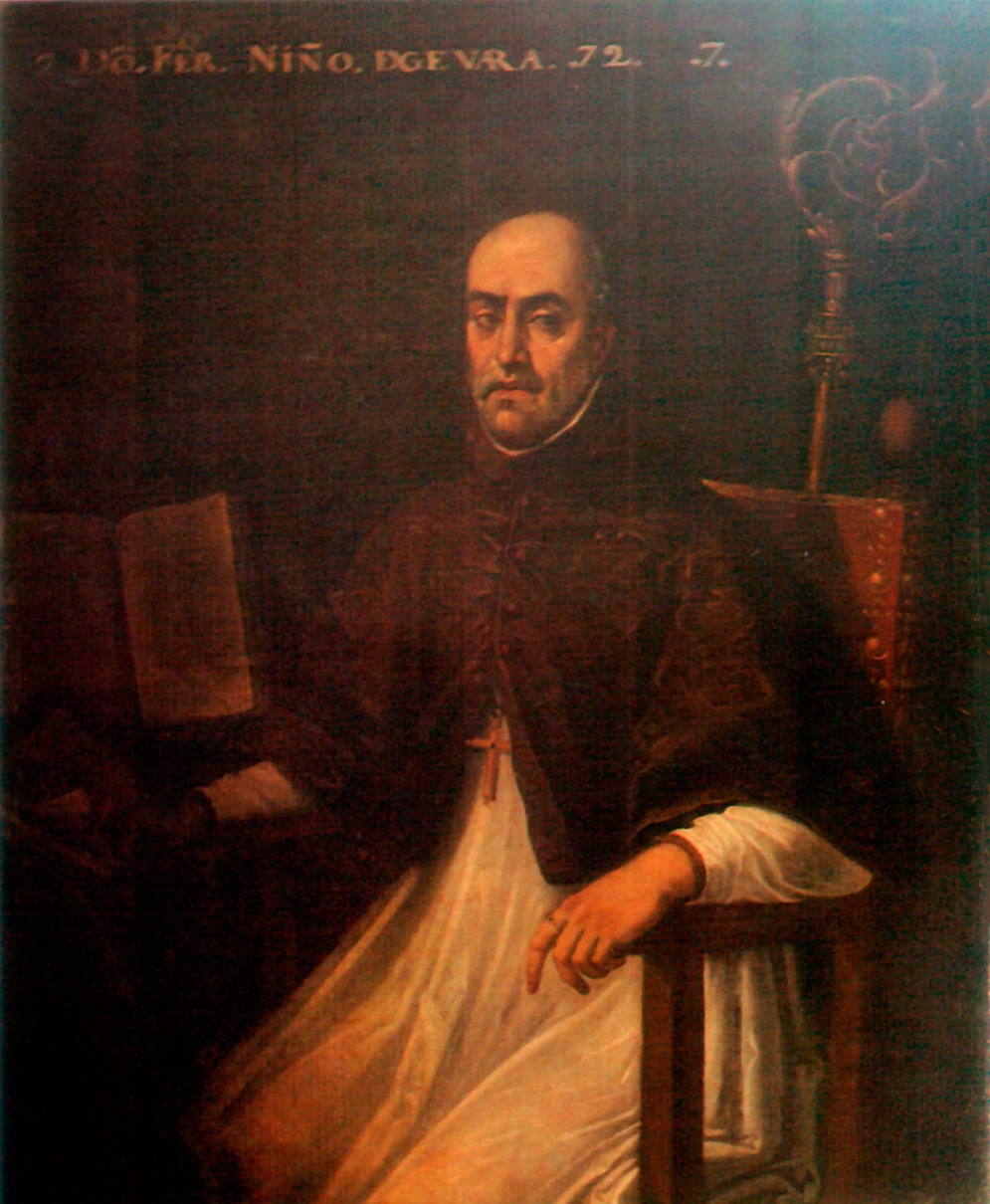
- Church: Catholic Church
- In office: 1546–1552
- Predecessor: Esteban Gabriel Merino
- Successor: Antonio de Fonseca
- Previous post: Bishop of Orense (1539–1542)

Orders
- Consecration: 5 Oct 1539

Personal details
- Born: Toledo, Spain
- Died: 16 September 1552

Fernando Niño y Zapata (died 1552) was a Roman Catholic prelate who served as Patriarch of West Indies (1546–1552), Administrator of Sigüenza (1546), Archbishop of Granada (1542–1546), and Bishop of Orense (1539–1542).

== Biography ==
Fernando Niño y Zapata was born in Toledo, Spain. On 18 Aug 1539, he was appointed during the papacy of Pope Paul III as Bishop of Orense. On 5 Oct 1539, he was consecrated bishop. On 22 Mar 1542, he was appointed during the papacy of Pope Paul III as Archbishop of Granada. On 8 Oct 1546, he was appointed during the papacy of Pope Paul III as Patriarch of West Indies and Apostolic Administrator of Sigüenza. He served as Patriarch of West Indies until his death on 16 Sep 1552.

While bishop, he was the principal consecrator of Pedro Guerrero Logrono, Archbishop of Granada (1547) .

== External links and additional sources ==
- Cheney, David M. "Diocese of Orense". Catholic-Hierarchy.org. (for Chronology of Bishops) ^{[self-published]}
- Chow, Gabriel. "Diocese of Orense (Spain)". GCatholic.org. (for Chronology of Bishops) ^{[self-published]}
- Cheney, David M. "Archdiocese of Granada". Catholic-Hierarchy.org. (for Chronology of Bishops) ^{[self-published]}
- Chow, Gabriel. "Metropolitan Archdiocese of Granada(Spain)". GCatholic.org. (for Chronology of Bishops) ^{[self-published]}
- Cheney, David M. "Diocese of Sigüenza-Guadalajara". Catholic-Hierarchy.org. (for Chronology of Bishops) ^{[self-published]}
- Chow, Gabriel. "Diocese of Sigüenza–Guadalajara (Spain)". GCatholic.org. (for Chronology of Bishops) ^{[self-published]}
- Cheney, David M. "Patriarchate of West Indies". Catholic-Hierarchy.org. (for Chronology of Bishops) ^{[self-published]}
- Chow, Gabriel. "Titular Patriarchal See of Indias Occidentales (Spain)". GCatholic.org. (for Chronology of Bishops) ^{[self-published]}

Catholic Church titles
Preceded by Antonio Ramírez de Haro	Bishop of Orense; 1539–1542	Succeeded by Francisco Manrique de Lara
Preceded by Gaspar Ávalos de la Cueva	Archbishop of Granada; 1542–1546	Succeeded by Pedro Guerrero Logroño
Preceded by Fernando de Valdés y Salas	Administrator of Sigüenza; 1546	Succeeded by Pedro Pacheco de Villena
Preceded by Esteban Gabriel Merino	Patriarch of West Indies; 1546–1552	Succeeded by Antonio de Fonseca
