= Torremuña =

- Populated place
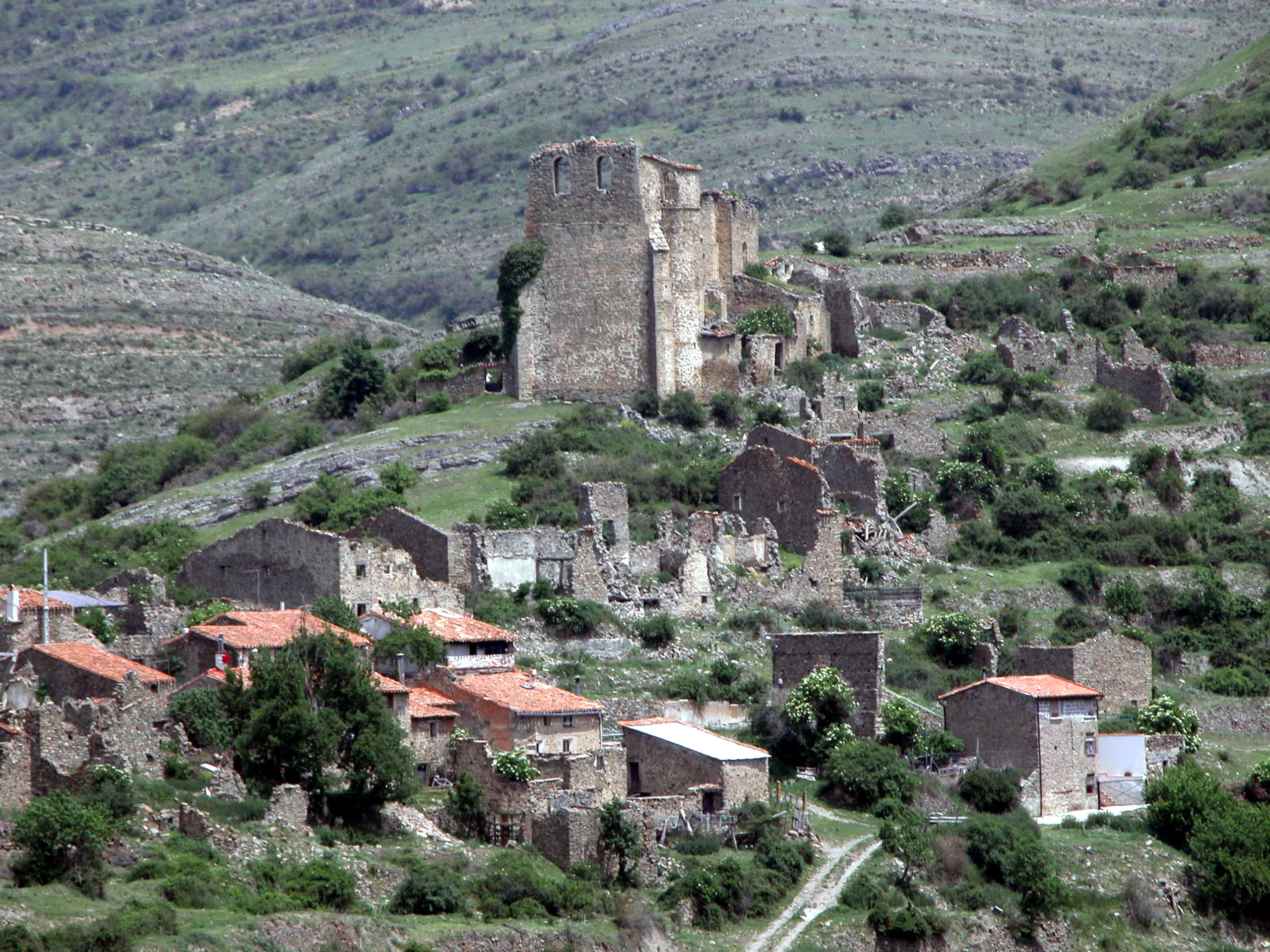
- View of Torremuña.

- Location within La Rioja, Spain Location within Spain
- Country: Spain
- Autonomous community: La Rioja
- Comarca: Camero Viejo

Population
  - Total: 12
- Postal code: 26133

Torremuña is a village in the municipality of Ajamil de Cameros, in the province and autonomous community of La Rioja, Spain. As of 2018 had a population of 12 people.
