= Ajamil =

Ajamil de Cameros Ajamil
- Municipality
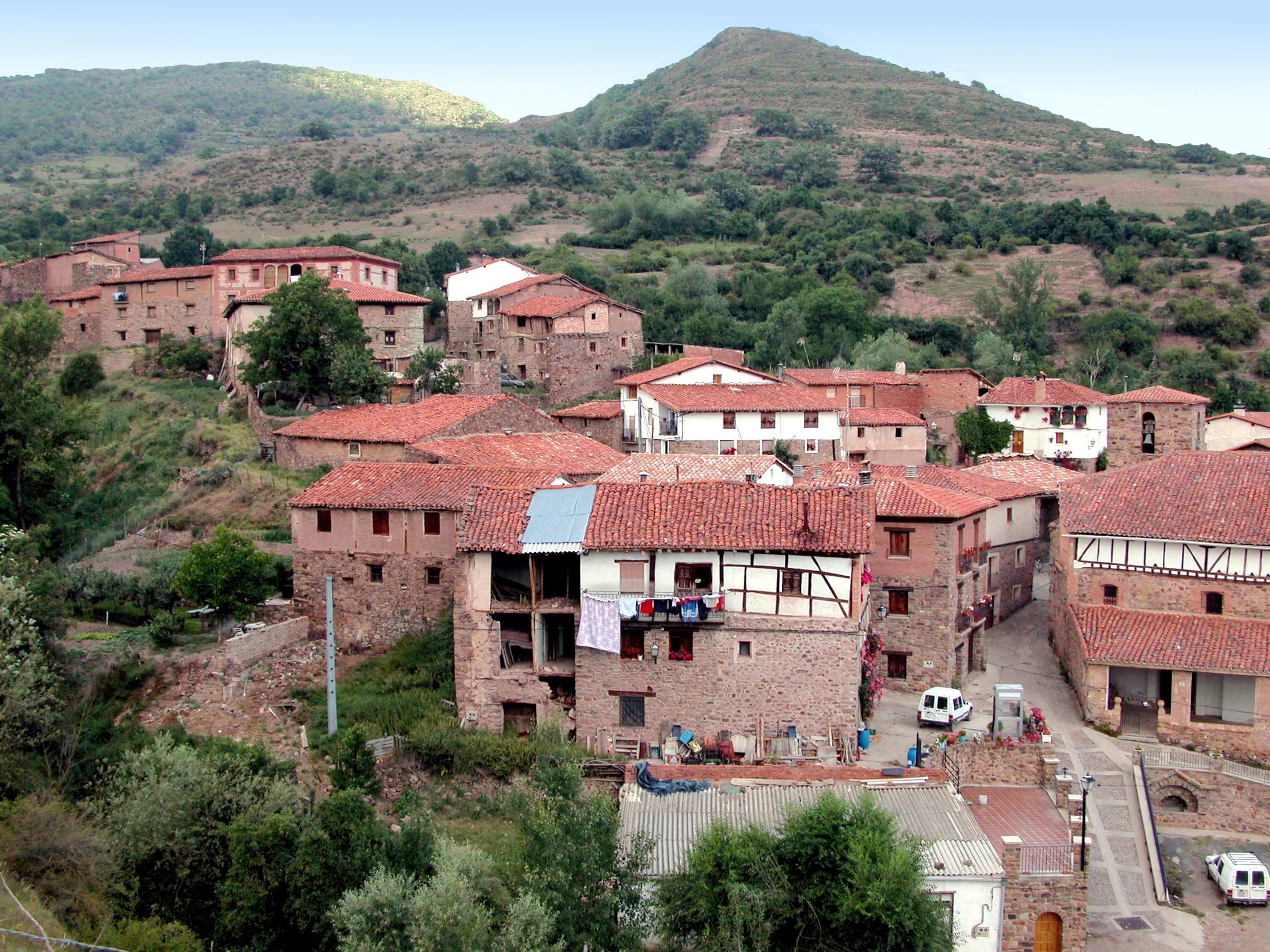
- Skyline of Ajamil de Cameros

- Municipality of Ajamil

- Location within La Rioja. Ajamil de Cameros (Spain)
- Coordinates: 42°10′01″N 2°29′14″W
- Country: Spain
- Autonomous communities of Spain: La Rioja
- Comarca: Camero Viejo

Government
  - Mayor: Eduardo García Galilea (PR+)

Area
  - Total: 66.15 km^{2} (25.54 sq mi)

Population (2025-01-01)
  - Total: 79
- Demonym: ajamilense
- Postal code: 26133

Ajamil (Spanish pronunciation: [a.xa.ˈmil]) is a village in the province and autonomous community of La Rioja, Spain. The municipality covers an area of 66.15 square kilometres (25.54 sq mi) and as of 2011 had a population of 80 people.

== Geography ==
There are two rivers: Vargas (also called Rabanera) and Vadillos, both tributaries of the Leza from the right.

In the south are located the northern foothills of the Sierra del Hayedo de Santiago, that connects with Cerro Castillo (1,683 m.) towards the west, which together have altitudes above 1,600 m and culminate in Canto Hincado (1,758 m.). This is the highest area of the municipality.

Just west of town is the Sierra de Camero Viejo (1,700, 1,300 m), which defines the town. The relief loses altitudes towards the north and east, (Potezuela, 1510 m., The Madorra. 1,470 m.). In the valleys of the Vadillos and Vargas river basins, the altitudes decrease as the course progresses.

== History ==
In 1366 when Henry II of Castile de Trastámara was crowned king in Calahorra, the Navarro gentleman Juan Ramirez de Arellano received from him the Lordship of Cameros in return for services rendered. Ajamil was among the peoples and places of the said lordship and power passed to the counts of Aguilar and Cameros lords, until the abolition of the feudal system with the Spanish Constitution of 1812.

In the census of the population of Castilla in the 16th century, Ajamil contained, along with Najera, 50 residences, about 300 individuals. Until the creation of the province of Logroño (by decree of 30 November 1833) the village was exempted and belonged to the province of Soria with its own independent jurisdiction in advance.

== Demographics ==
=== Population centres ===
- Ajamil
- Larriba
- Torremuña
- La Aldehuela
- La Edradilla

== Economy ==
The city's economy primarily involves agricultural and livestock production. Agriculture is done on a small scale with production in kitchen gardens of borage, beet, potato, pepper, and fodder.

Livestock is the basis of the local economy, whose cottages comprise cattle and horses. The area of forested land exceeds 5,800 hectares. There is plenty of hunting, especially for wild boar.

== Photo gallery ==
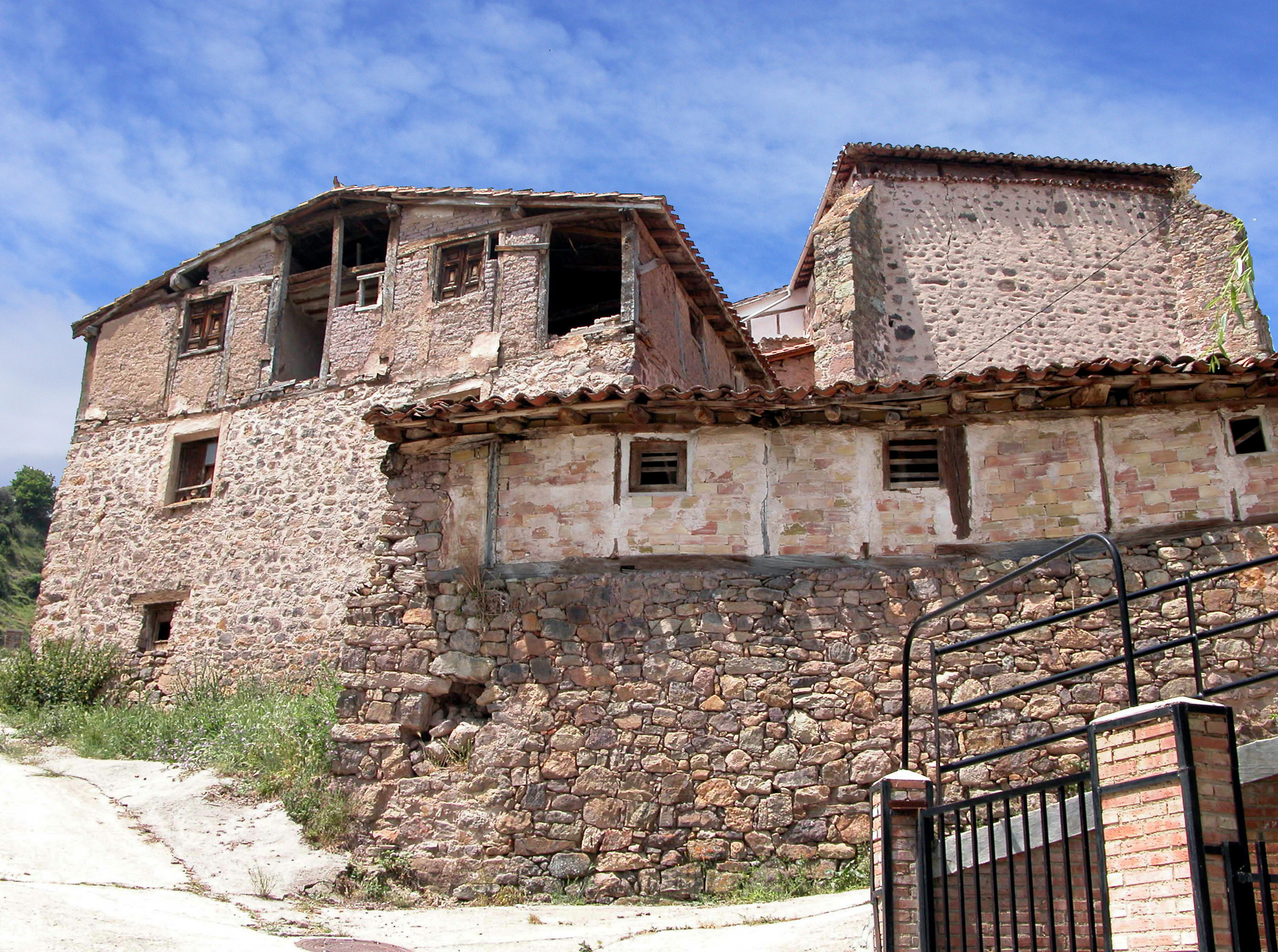
Typical Camerata architecture.

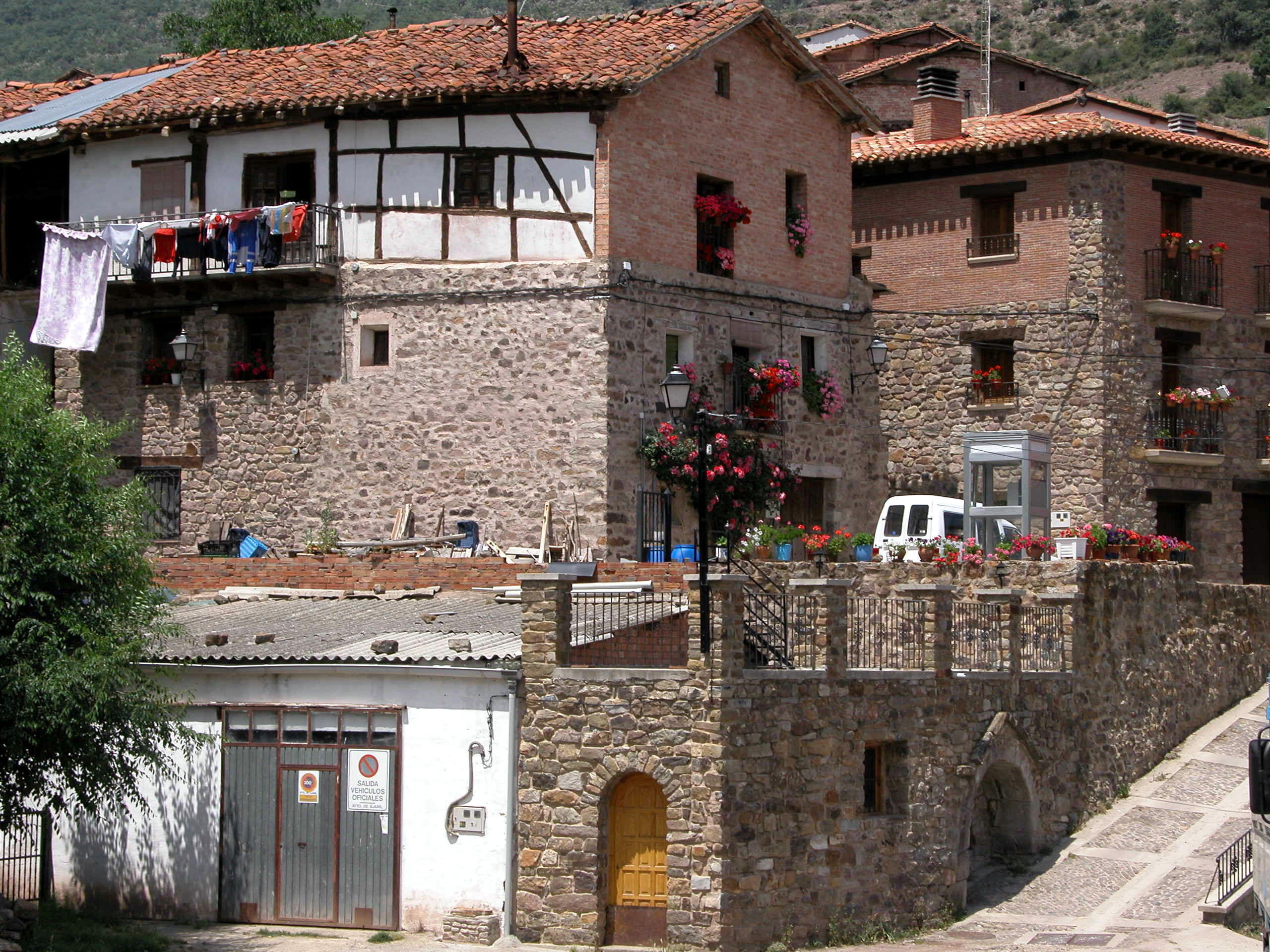
The town center.

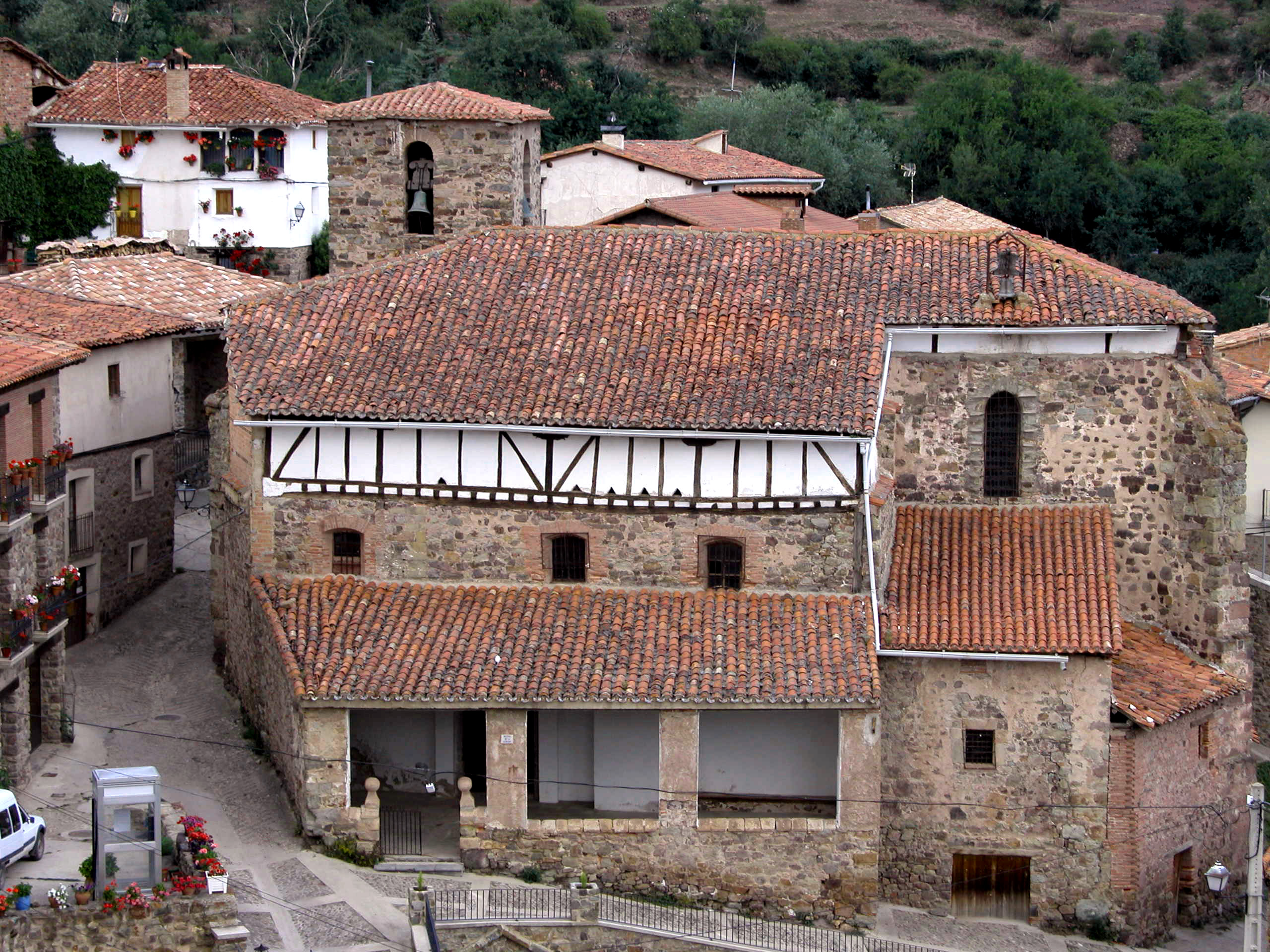
Church of the Assumption (s. XVI-XVII).

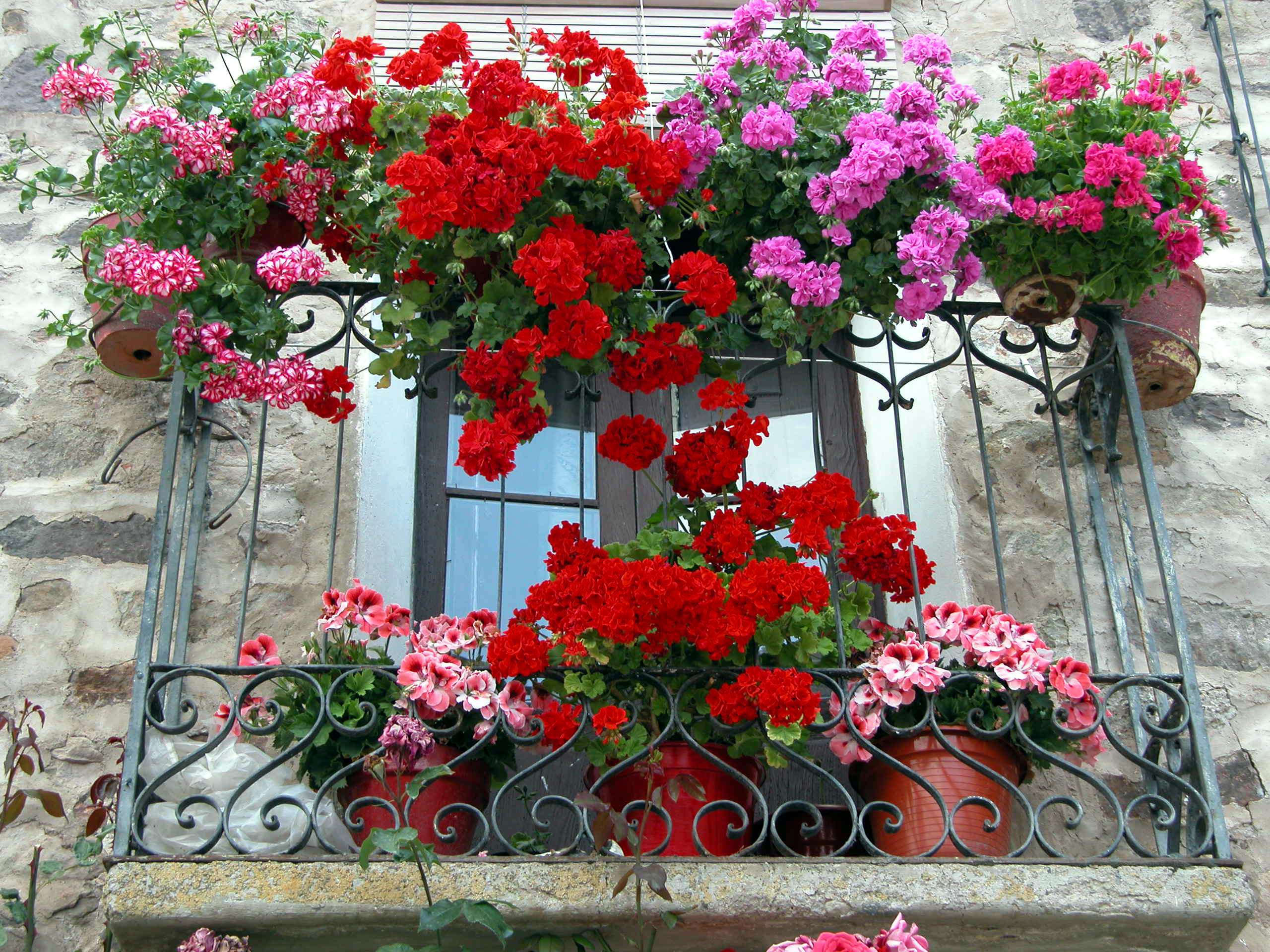
One of his flowery balconies.

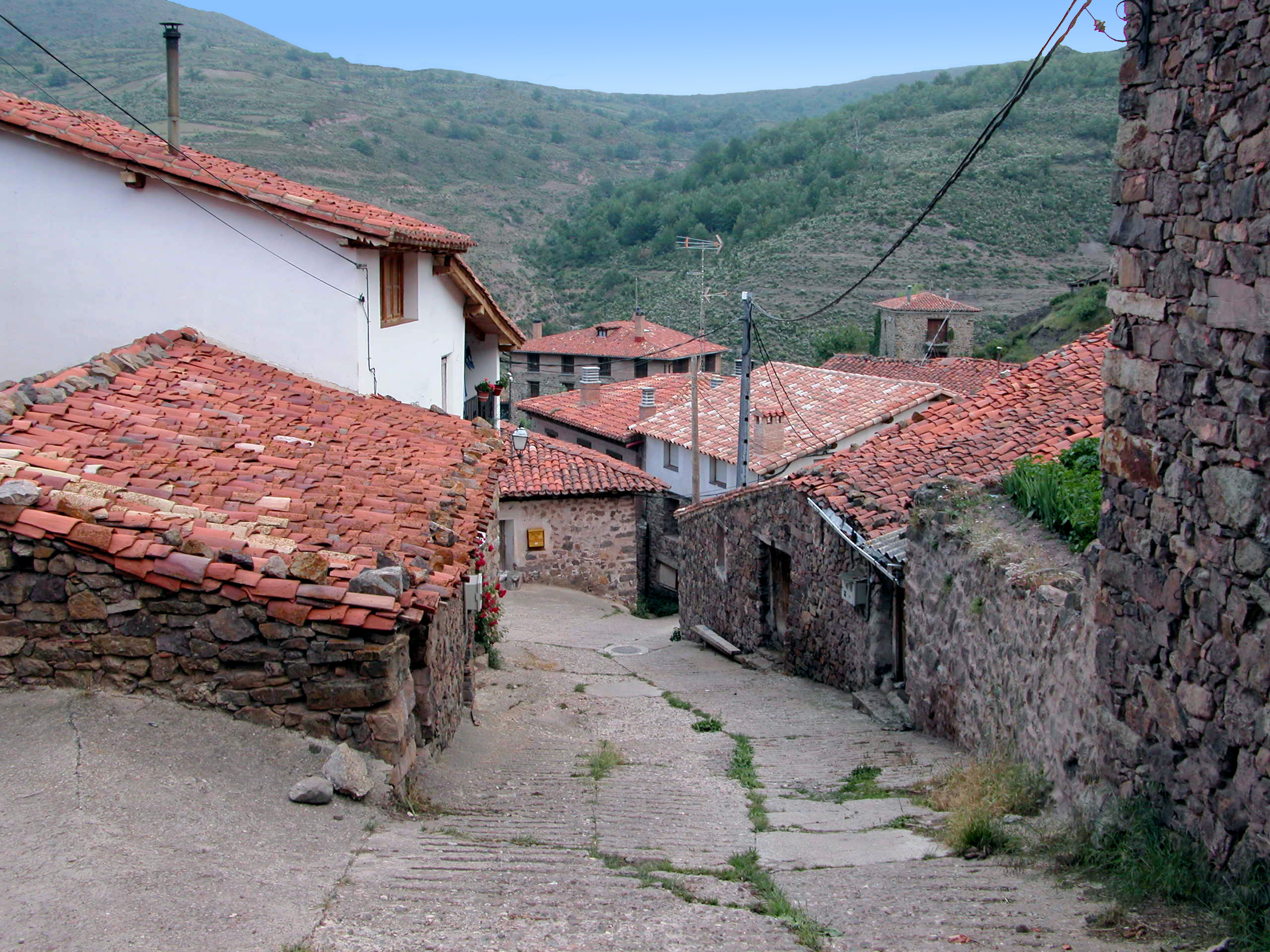
A typical street in the village.

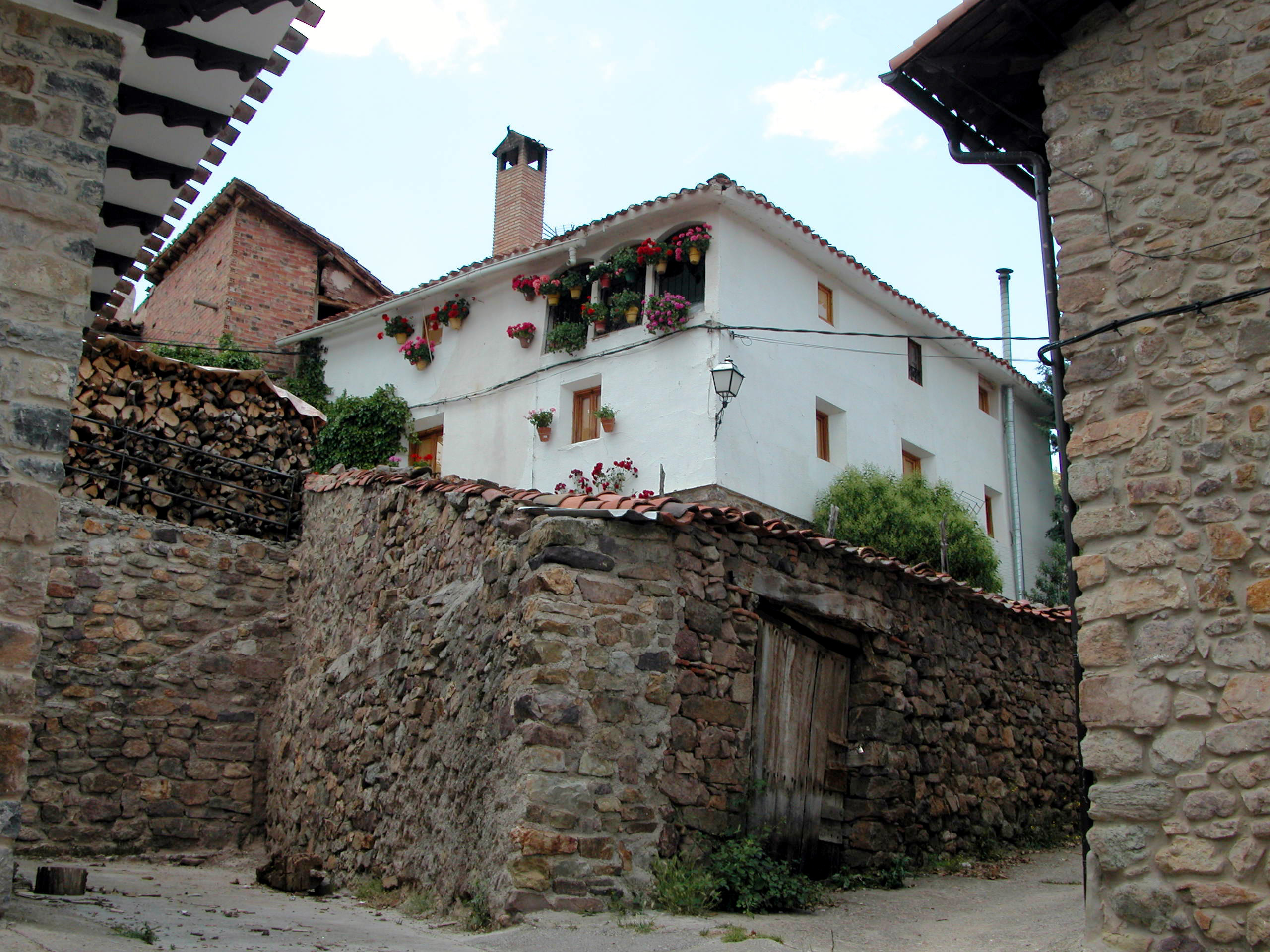
One of its beautiful streets.
