= Larriba =

- Populated place
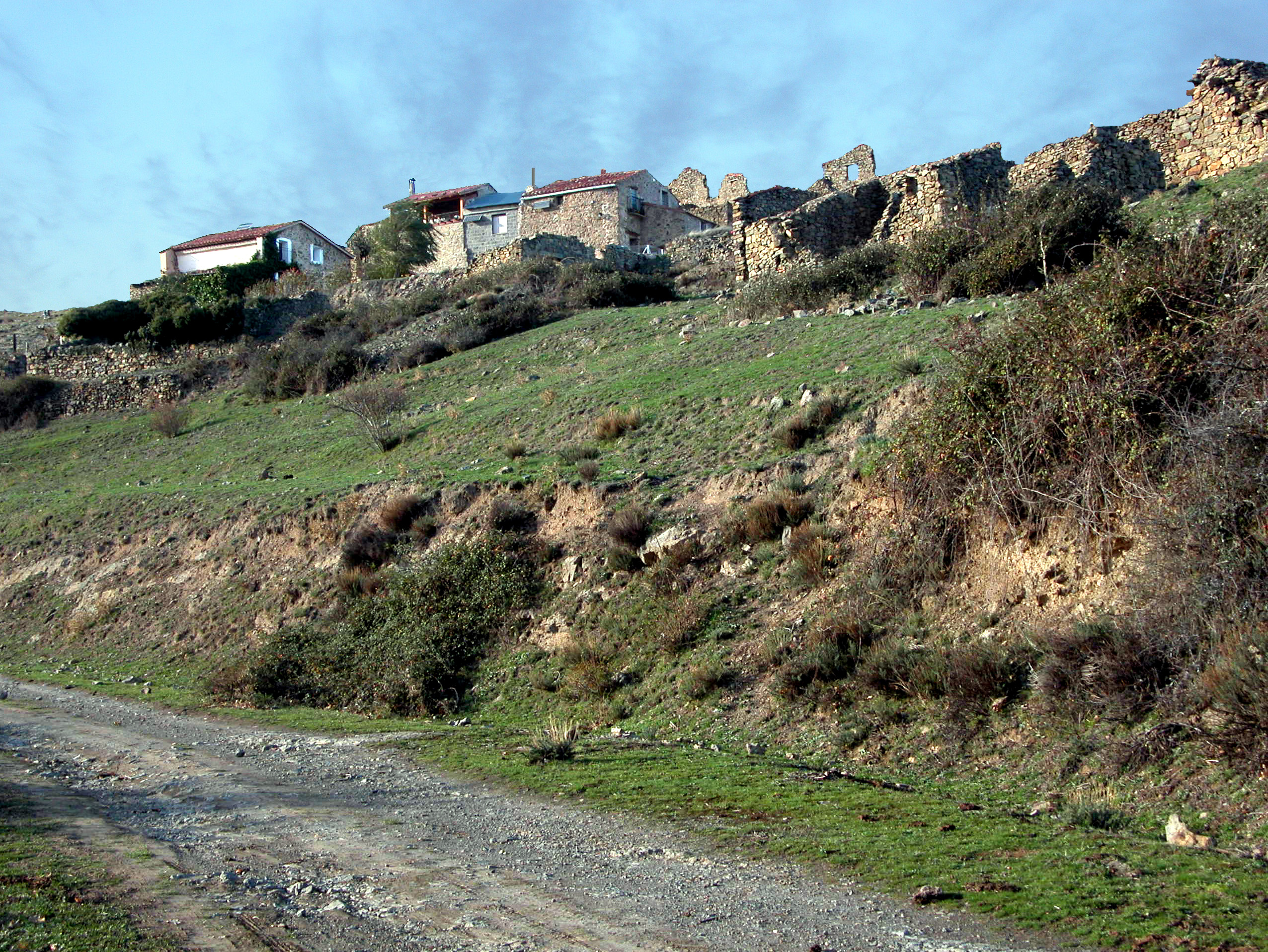
- View of Larriba.

- Location within La Rioja, Spain Location within Spain
- Country: Spain
- Autonomous community: La Rioja
- Comarca: Camero Viejo

Population
  - Total: 7
- Postal code: 26133

Larriba is a village in the municipality of Ajamil, in the province and autonomous community of La Rioja, Spain. As of 2018, it had a population of 7 people.
