= Diocese of Guadix =

Diocese of the Catholic Church in Spain

Diocese of Guadix Dioecesis Guadicensis Diócesis de Guadix

Catholic
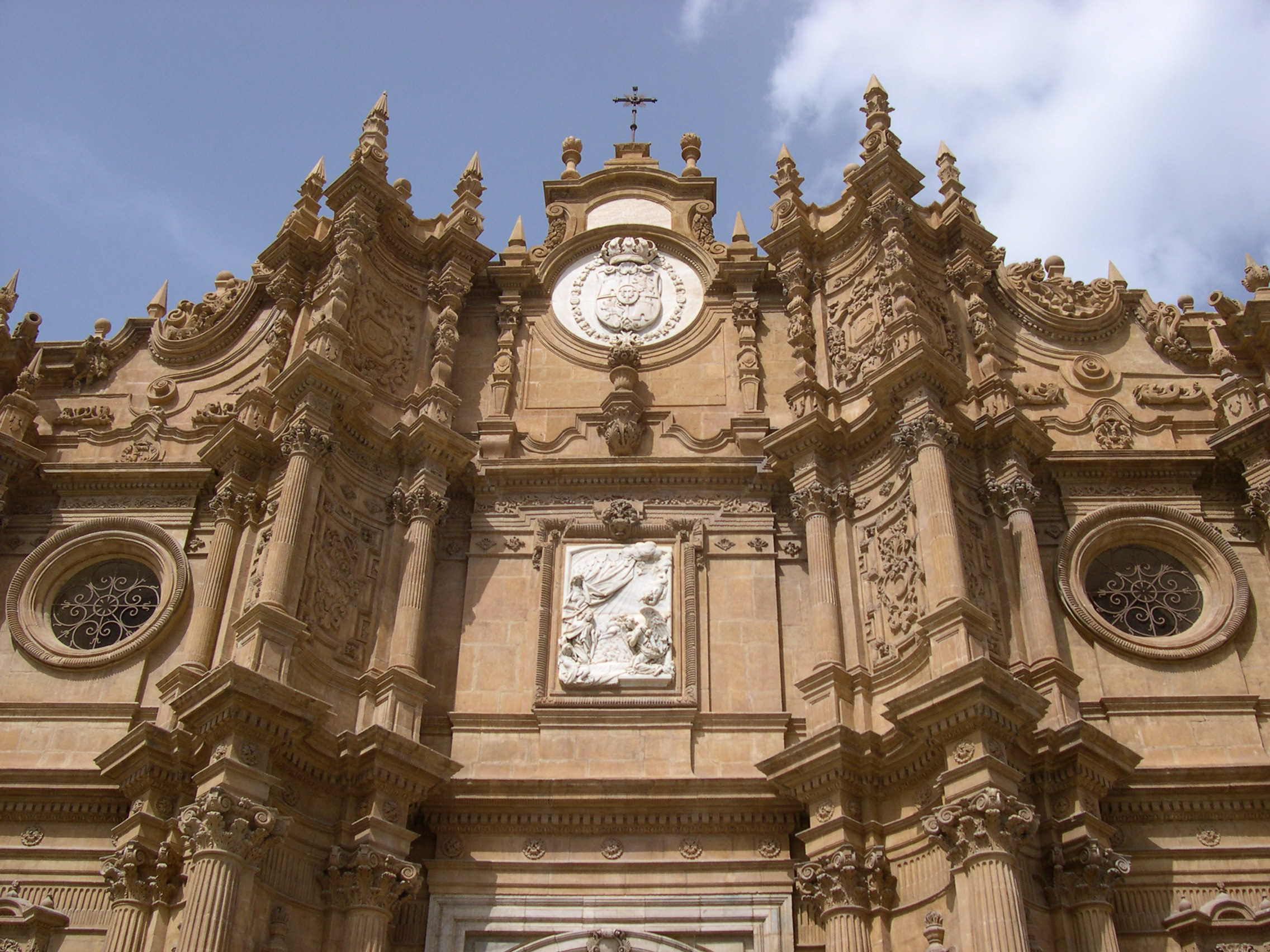
- Guadix Cathedral

Location
- Country: Spain
- Ecclesiastical province: Granada
- Metropolitan: Granada
- Coordinates: 37°18′04″N 3°08′11″W

Statistics
- Area: 5,577 km^{2} (2,153 sq mi)
- Population: Total; Catholics: (as of 2006); 109,254; 107,000 (97.9%)

Information
- Denomination: Roman Catholic
- Rite: Latin Rite
- Established: 1st Century
- Cathedral: Cathedral of Our Lady of the Annunciation in Guadix
- Co-cathedral: Co-Cathedral of Our Lady of the Incarnation in Baza

Current leadership
- Pope: Leo XIV
- Bishop: Francisco Jesús Orozco Mengíbar
- Metropolitan Archbishop: Francisco Javier Martínez Fernández

Map

Website
- Website of the Diocese

The Diocese of Guadix (Latin: Dioecesis Guadicensis) is a Latin suffragan diocese of the Catholic Church in the ecclesiastical province of Granada in Andalusia, southern Spain and a Latin titular bishopric under its Ancient name of Acci. Its cathedral episcopal see is Nuestra Señora de la Anunciación, dedicated to Our Lady of the Annunciation, in the city of Guadix, administrative province of Granada. It was commenced in 1710, on the site occupied by the principal mosque, and completed in 1796.

The diocese also has an (also Marian) co-cathedral, Nuestra Señora Santa María de la Encarnación, dedicated to Our Lady of the Incarnation (of Christ), in Baza, built as cathedral of the absorbed Diocese of Baza (Basti, suppressed circa 700).

The Seminary of St. Torquatus was founded by Bishop Juan José Fonseca in 1595. King Charles IV of Spain founded a hospice in 1803, and the ancient Jesuit college had become a hospital before the early 20th century.

== Statistics ==
The modern diocese of Guadix comprises the greater part of the Province of Granada and a portion of the Province of Almería. As per 2014, it pastorally served 102,000 Catholics (97.3% of 104,871 total) on 5,677 km^{2} in 74 parishes and 67 missions with 58 priests (55 diocesan, 3 religious), 114 lay religious (8 brothers, 106 sisters) and 4 seminarians.

== Bishopric of Acci ==
The first bishopric was established in 47 AD. The legend of the Seven Apostolic Men, preserved in the Mozarabic Missal, places the episcopal see of St. Torquatus (bishop from 47), one of the seven, in Ancient Acci, now called Guadix el Viejo, 6 km northwest of the modern city of Guadix, where the matron Luparia built a baptistery and primitive church. From then until 303, when Felix presided at the Council of Elvira, no record is preserved of the Accitanian bishops. However one names one called Atanasia and one Emiliano (136? – ?)

Liliolus attended the Third Council of Toledo in 589, and the names of the Accitanian bishops are to be found among those who attended the other Toletan councils; Clarencius at the fourth and fifth; Justus at the sixth; Julian at the eighth; Magnarius at the ninth and tenth; and Ricila, the last bishop whose name has come down to us before the Muslim invasion, at subsequent ones.

In 741 it was suppressed, due to the Moorish conquest of Andalusia.

In the Mozarabic period the diocese of Acci continued to exist. Isidorus Pacensis mentions Frodoarius, who presided seven years over the see. Quiricus assisted at the Council of Córdoba in 839.

The Almohades, in the 12th century, destroyed this together with the other Andalusian sees.

=== Titular see of Acci ===
By right of postliminium, the apostolic rank possessed by the see of Acci previous to the Islamic invasion is attributed to that of Guadix. The Annuario Pontificio gives the date of foundation of the diocese of Guadix as 1st century AD. It also lists the ancient see of Acci as a titular see (one that no longer has a diocesan bishop), thus distinguishing it from the bishopric of Guadix, so there are two parallel titles and lists of incumbents.

Since the Ancient diocese was nominally restored in 1969 as Latin Titular bishopric of Acci, Latin adjective Accitan(us), it has had the following incumbents, so far all of the fitting Episcopal (lowest) rank, including an Eastern Catholic:

- Henryk Gulbinowicz, (1970.01.12 – 1976.01.03) as Apostolic Administrator of Vilnius (Lithuania, then USSR) (1970.01.12 – 1976.01.03); later Metropolitan Archbishop of Wrocław (Breslau, Poland) (1976.01.03 – 2004.04.03), created Cardinal-Priest of Immacolata Concezione di Maria a Grottarossa (1985.05.25 – ...)
- Joseph Phan Văn Hoa (1976.03.30 – death 1987.10.06) as Coadjutor Bishop of Quy Nhon (Vietnam) (1976.03.30 – 1987.10.06)
- Vilhelms Nukšs (1987.11.23 – death 1993.02.27), first as Auxiliary Bishop of Diocese of Liepāja (Latvia, then USSR) (1987.11.23 – 1991), then Auxiliary Bishop of Archdiocese of Riga (Latvia) (1987.11.23 – 1993.02.27)
- Heinrich Fasching (1993.05.24 – death 2014.06.01), first as Auxiliary Bishop of Diocese of Sankt Pölten (Austria) (1993.05.24 – retired 2004.10.07), then on emeritate
- Hryhoriy Komar (2014.06.25 – ...), Auxiliary Bishop of Sambir–Drohobych of the Ukrainians (Ukraine, Byzantine rite).

== Bishopric of Guadix ==
An effective diocese was not restored until the time of the Catholic sovereigns. Cardinal Pedro González de Mendoza, Archbishop of Toledo, erected the new see of Guadix on 21 May 1492, in virtue of the Apostolic commission of Innocent VIII granted on 4 August 1486. It comprised the territory of the old dioceses of Acci and Basti. The collegiate church at Baza, the new name of Basti, was reluctant to accept rule from Guadix. As a compromise, the collegiate church was given authority, under the bishop, over twelve parishes, and the name of the bishopric was changed to Diocese Guadix-Baza, indicating a union of two dioceses under a single bishop. This continued until 1851, when the collegiate church became a simple parish church and the diocese resumed the name of Diocese of Guadix.

In 1957 it lost territory to the Diocese of Almeria.

=== Bishops of Guadix ===
- Pedro (?–1401)
- Nicolás, Friars Minor (O.F.M.) (1401–1417)
- Pedro (1417–1434)
- Fernando de Atienza, O.F.M. (19 Feb 1434 – 1472 Died)
- Pedro (1475.06.03 – 1485.04.01)
- García de Quijada, O.F.M. (21 May 1490 – ?1522 Died)
- Pedro González Manso (31 August 1523 – 26 Oct 1524 ? 1524.10.26), next Bishop of Bishop of Tui ((1524.10.26 – 1525.07.03), Bishop of Badajoz (Spain) (1525.07.03 – 1532.03.13), Bishop of Osma (Spain) (1532.03.13 – death 1537.02.12)
- Gaspar de Ávalos de la Cueva (14 Nov 1524 – 22 Jan 1529), next Metropolitan Archbishop of Granada) (Andalusia, southern Spain) (1529.01.22 – 1542.03.29), Metropolitan Archbishop of (Santiago de) Compostela (northern Spain) (1542.03.29 – 1545.11.02), created Cardinal-Priest with no Title assigned (1544.12.19 – death 1545.11.02)
- Antonio Guevara Noroña, O.F.M. (22 Jan 1528 – 11 April 1537), next Bishop of Mondoñedo) (Spain) (1537.04.11 – death 1545.04.03)
- Antonio del Aguila Vela y Paz (11 April 1537 – 9 April 1546), next Bishop of Zamora (Spain) (1546.04.09 – 1560)
- Martín Pérez de Ayala (16 May 1548 – 17 July 1560), next Bishop of Segovia (1560.07.17 – 1564.09.06), Metropolitan Archbishop of Valencia (southern Spain) (1564.09.06 – 1566.08.05)
- Melchor Alvarez de Vozmediano (4 Sep 1560 – retired 1570), died 1597
- Julián Ramirez, Military Order of Saint James the Sword (O.S.) (15 Dec 1574 – death 1581), Metropolitan Archbishop of Valencia (Spain) (1564.09.06 – 1566.08.05)
- Juan Alonso Moscoso (6 July 1582 – 30 August 1593), next Bishop of Bishop of León (Spain) (1593.08.30 – 1603.05.09), Bishop of Málaga (Spain) (1603.05.09 – death 1614.08.21)
- Juan Fonseca (15 Nov 1593 – death 16 Nov 1604), founded the Seminary of St. Torquatus
- Juan Orozco Covarrubias y Leiva (16 Jan 1606 – death 23 June 1610), previously Bishop of Agrigento (Sicily, Italy) (1594.12.02 – 1606.01.16)
- Juan Nicolás Valdés de Carriazo (10 Oct 1611 – death 9 March 1617), previously Bishop of Islas Canarias (Canary Islands, Spain) (1610.04.26 – 1611.10.10)
- Jerónimo Herrera Salazar (2 Oct 1617 – death 30 July 1619)
- Plácido Tosantos Medina, Benedictine Order (O.S.B.) (6 April 1620 – 12 Feb 1624), next Bishop of Zamora (Spain) (1624.04.27 – death 1624.08.30)
- Juan Arauz Díaz, O.F.M. (7 Oct 1624 – death 16 August 1635)
- Juan Dionisio Fernández Portocarrero (28 Jan 1636 – 16 July 1640), next Bishop of Cádiz (Andalusia, Spain) (1640.07.16 – death 1641.11.27)
- Juan Queipo de Llano y Valdés (bishop) (13 August 1640 – 13 July 1643) next Bishop of Coria (Spain) (1643.07.13 – death 1643.10.17)
- Francisco Pérez Roya (3 August 1643 – death 25 April 1648), previously Bishop of Perpignan–Elne (southern France) (1638.06.21 – 1643.08.03)
- Bernardino Rodríguez de Arriaga, Augustinians (O.S.A.) (7 Dec 1648 – death 4 Dec 1651)
- Diego Serrano Sotomayor, Mercedarians (O. de M.) (29 April 1652 – death 5 Oct 1652), previously Bishop of Solsona (Spain) (1635.12.03 – 1639.05.30), Bishop of Segorbe (Spain) (1639.05.30 – 1652.04.29)
- ? José de Láyñez y Gutiérrez, O.S.A. (17 March 1653 – death 14 Oct 1667)
- ? Diego de Silva y Pacheco, O.S.B. (28 Feb 1668 – 27 May 1675 Appointed, Bishop of Astorga)
- ? Clemente Alvarez López, Dominican Order (O.P.) (15 July 1675 – 17 June 1688 Died)
- ? Juan de Villacé y Vozmediano (27 Sep 1688 – 13 April 1693 Appointed, Bishop of Plasencia)
- Pedro de Palacios y Tenorio, O.P. (8 June 1693 – ?death 1700 ? 31 July 1702 Resigned)
- Juan Feyjóo González de Villalobos, Carmelite Order (O. Carm.) (31 July 1702 – death Feb 1706), previously Prior General of Order of the Brothers of Our Lady of Mount Carmel (Carmelites) (1692–1698)
- Juan Montalbán Gómez, O.P. (13 Sep 1706 – 16 Sep 1720), next Bishop of Plasencia (Spain) (1720.09.16 – death 1720.11.12)
- Felipe de los Tueros Huerta (3 Feb 1721 – 20 Jan 1734), next Archbishop of Granada (Spain) (1734.01.20 – death 1751.09.12)
- Francisco Salgado Quirago (24 March 1734 – death April 1744)
- Andrés Licht Barrera (25 Jan 1745 – 17 Jan 1750 Resigned), died 1751
- Miguel (a S. Iosepho) Valejo Berlanga, Trinitarians (O.SS.T.) (19 Jan 1750 – death 17 May 1757)
- Francisco Alejandro Bocanegra Jivaja (19 Dec 1757 – 8 March 1773), next Archbishop of Santiago de Compostela (Spain) (1773.03.08 – death 1782.04.16)
- Bernardo Lorca Quiñones, Hieronymites (O.S.H.) (15 March 1773 – death 19 Jan 1793)
- Raimundo Melchor Magi Gómez, O. de M. (14 Oct 1797 – death 26 Sep 1803)
- Marcos Cabello y López, O.S.A. (20 August 1804 – death 6 Sep 1819)
- Juan José Cordón Leyva (3 May 1824 – death 3 April 1827)
- José Uraga Pérez (28 Jan 1828 – death 3 Sep 1840
- Apostolic Administrator Cardinal Francisco Javier de Cienfuegos y Jovellanos (1840 – 1847.06.21), while Metropolitan Archbishop of Sevilla (Sevilla, Andalusia, Spain) (1824.12.20 – death 1847.06.21), created Cardinal-Priest of S. Maria del Popolo (1831.02.28 – 1847.06.21); previously Bishop of Cádiz (Andalusia, Spain) (1819.06.04 – 1824.12.20)
- Antonio Lao y Cuevas (7 Jan 1850 – death 14 July 1850), previously Bishop of Teruel (Spain) (1847.12.17 – 1850.05.14)
- Juan José Arbolí y Acaso (18 March 1852 – 22 Dec 1853), next Bishop of Cádiz (Spain) (1853.12.22 – death 1863.02.01)
- Mariano Martínez Robledo y Robledo (7 April 1854 – death 3 Feb 1855)
- Antonio Rafael Domínguez y Valdecañas (25 Sep 1857 – death 21 Dec 1865)
- Mariano Brezmes y Arredondo (25 June 1866 – 17 Sep 1875), next Bishop of Astorga (1875.09.17 – death 1885.11.11)
- Vicente Pontes y Cantelar, O.S.A. (17 Sep 1875 – 18 March 1893 Died)
- Maximiliano Fernández del Rincón y Soto Dávila (21 May 1894 – death 24 July 1907), previously Bishop of Teruel (Spain) (1891.06.01 – 1894.05.21) and Apostolic Administrator of Albarracín (Spain) (1891.06.01 – 1894.05.21)
- Timoteo Hernández y Mulas (19 Dec 1907 – death 19 March 1921)
- Ángel Marquina y Corrales (6 Sep 1922 – 1 Jan 1928 Died), previously Bishop of Islas Canarias (Canaries, Spain) (1913.07.18 – 1922.09.06)
- Blessed Manuel Medina y Olmos (2 Oct 1928 – death 30 August 1936), previously Titular Bishop of Amorium (1925.12.14 – 1928.10.02) as Auxiliary Bishop of Granada (Andalusia, Spain) (1925.12.14 – 1928.10.02)
- Apostolic Administrator Agustín Parrado García (1939–1942), while Metropolitan Archbishop of Granada (Spain) (1934.04.04 – death 1946.10.08); previously Bishop of Palencia (Spain) (1925.05.20 – 1934.04.04) and Apostolic Administrator of Jaén (Spain) (1936 – 1942.12.29); later created Cardinal-Priest of Sant'Agostino (1946.02.22 – 1946.10.08)
- Rafael Alvarez Lara (10 June 1943 – 10 March 1965), next Bishop of Mallorca (Balearic Spain) (1965.03.10 – retired 1973.04.13); died 1996
- Gabino Díaz Merchán (23 July 1965 – 4 August 1969), next Archbishop of Oviedo (Spain) (1969.08.04 – retired 2002.01.07), President of Episcopal Conference of Spain (1981–1987)
- Antonio Dorado Soto (31 March 1970 – 1 Sep 1973), next Bishop of Cádiz y Ceuta (Spain) (1973.09.01 – 1993.03.26), Bishop of Málaga (Balearic Spain) (1993.03.26 – retired 2008.10.10); died 2015
- Ignacio Noguer Carmona (10 Sep 1976 – 19 Oct 1990), next Coadjutor Bishop of Huelva (Spain) (1990.10.19 – 1993.10.27), succeeding as Bishop of Huelva (1993.10.27 – retired 2006.07.17); died 2019
- Juan García-Santacruz Ortiz (31 March 1992 – retired 3 December 2009); died 2011
- Ginés Ramón García Beltrán (3 December 2009 – 3 January 2018), appointed Bishop of Getafe
- Francisco Jesús Orozco Mengíbar (30 October 2018 – present)

== See also ==
- List of Catholic dioceses in Spain, Andorra, Ceuta and Gibraltar
- Roman Catholicism in Spain

== Sources and external links ==
- Official website
- GCatholic - Acci, with Google satellite photo ^{[self-published]}
- GCatholic - Guadix, with Google map and satellite photo ^{[self-published]}
- Catholic Hierarchy ^{[self-published]}
