= Sacristán =

Sacristán (Spanish pronunciation: [sakɾisˈtan]) is a Spanish surname meaning sacristan.

Notable people with this surname include:

- Andrés Sardá Sacristán (1929–2019), Spanish textile engineer and fashion designer
- Augusto Ibáñez Sacristán, Basque pelota forward player
- Emilio Sacristan Rock, Mexican inventor
- Eusebio Sacristán, Spanish football player
- Gregorio Martínez Sacristán (1946–2019), Spanish Roman Catholic bishop
- José Sacristán, Spanish actor
- Julio Sacristán (1953 – 2025), Spanish politician
- Manuel Sacristán (1925–1985), Spanish philosopher
