= Juan García-Santacruz Ortiz =

Spanish bishop (1933–2011)

- Bishop of Guadix
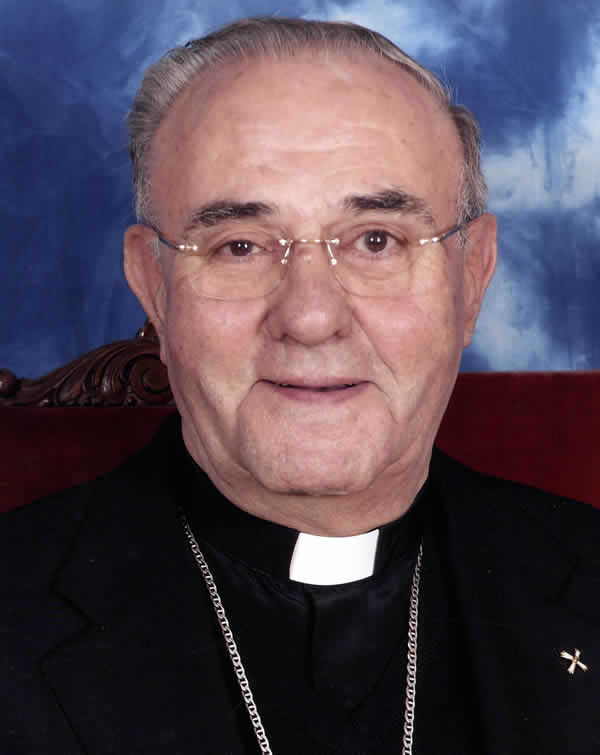
- Church: Catholic Church
- Diocese: Diocese of Guadix
- In office: 31 March 1992 – 3 December 2009
- Predecessor: Ignacio Noguer Carmona
- Successor: Ginés García Beltrán

Orders
- Ordination: 26 May 1956
- Consecration: 14 June 1992 by Mario Tagliaferri

Personal details
- Born: 11 January 1933 Navahermosa, Province of Toledo, Spanish Republic
- Died: 12 March 2011 (aged 78)

Juan García-Santacruz Ortiz (11 January 1933 – 12 March 2011) was the Roman Catholic bishop of the Roman Catholic Diocese of Guadix, Spain.

Ordained in 1956, he was named bishop in 1992. Ortiz retired in 2009.
