= Pedro Manuel =

Most Reverend Pedro Manuel
- Archbishop of Santiago de Compostela
- Church: Catholic Church
- Archdiocese: Archdiocese of Santiago de Compostela
- In office: 1546–1550
- Predecessor: Gaspar de Ávalos de la Cueva
- Successor: Juan Álvarez de Toledo
- Previous posts: Bishop of León (1523–1534); Bishop of Zamora (1534–1546)

Personal details
- Died: 1 January 1550 Santiago de Compostela, Spain

Pedro Manuel (died 1 January 1550) was a Roman Catholic prelate who served as Archbishop of Santiago de Compostela (1546–1550), Bishop of Zamora (1534–1546), and Bishop of León (1523–1534).

== Biography ==
On 12 June 1523, Pedro Manuel was appointed during the papacy of Pope Adrian VI as Bishop of León. On 17 June 1534, he was appointed during the papacy of Pope Clement VII as bishop of Zamora. On 9 April 1546, Pedro Manuel was appointed during the papacy of Pope Paul III as Archbishop of Santiago de Compostela. He served as Archbishop of Santiago de Compostela until his death on 1 January 1550. While bishop, he was the principal consecrator of Juan González Munébraga, Bishop of Tarazona (1547).

== External links and additional sources ==
- Cheney, David M. "Diocese of León". Catholic-Hierarchy.org. (for Chronology of Bishops) ^{[self-published]}
- Chow, Gabriel. "Diocese of León". GCatholic.org. (for Chronology of Bishops) ^{[self-published]}
- Cheney, David M. "Diocese of Zamora". Catholic-Hierarchy.org. (for Chronology of Bishops) ^{[self-published]}
- Chow, Gabriel. "Diocese of Zamora (Spain)". GCatholic.org. (for Chronology of Bishops) ^{[self-published]}
- Cheney, David M. "Archdiocese of Santiago de Compostela". Catholic-Hierarchy.org. (for Chronology of Bishops) ^{[self-published]}
- Chow, Gabriel. "Archdiocese of Santiago de Compostela (Spain)". GCatholic.org. (for Chronology of Bishops) ^{[self-published]}

Catholic Church titles
| Preceded by Esteban Gabriel Merino | Bishop of León; 1523–1534 | Succeeded by Pedro Alvarez de Acosta |
| Preceded by Francisco Mendoza | Bishop of Zamora; 1534–1546 | Succeeded by Antonio del Aguila Vela y Paz |
| Preceded by Gaspar de Ávalos de la Cueva | Archbishop of Santiago de Compostela; 1546–1550 | Succeeded by Juan Álvarez de Toledo |
