= Francisco Jesús Orozco Mengíbar =

Roman Catholic bishop

Most Reverend Francisco Jesús Orozco Mengíbar
- Bishop of Guadix
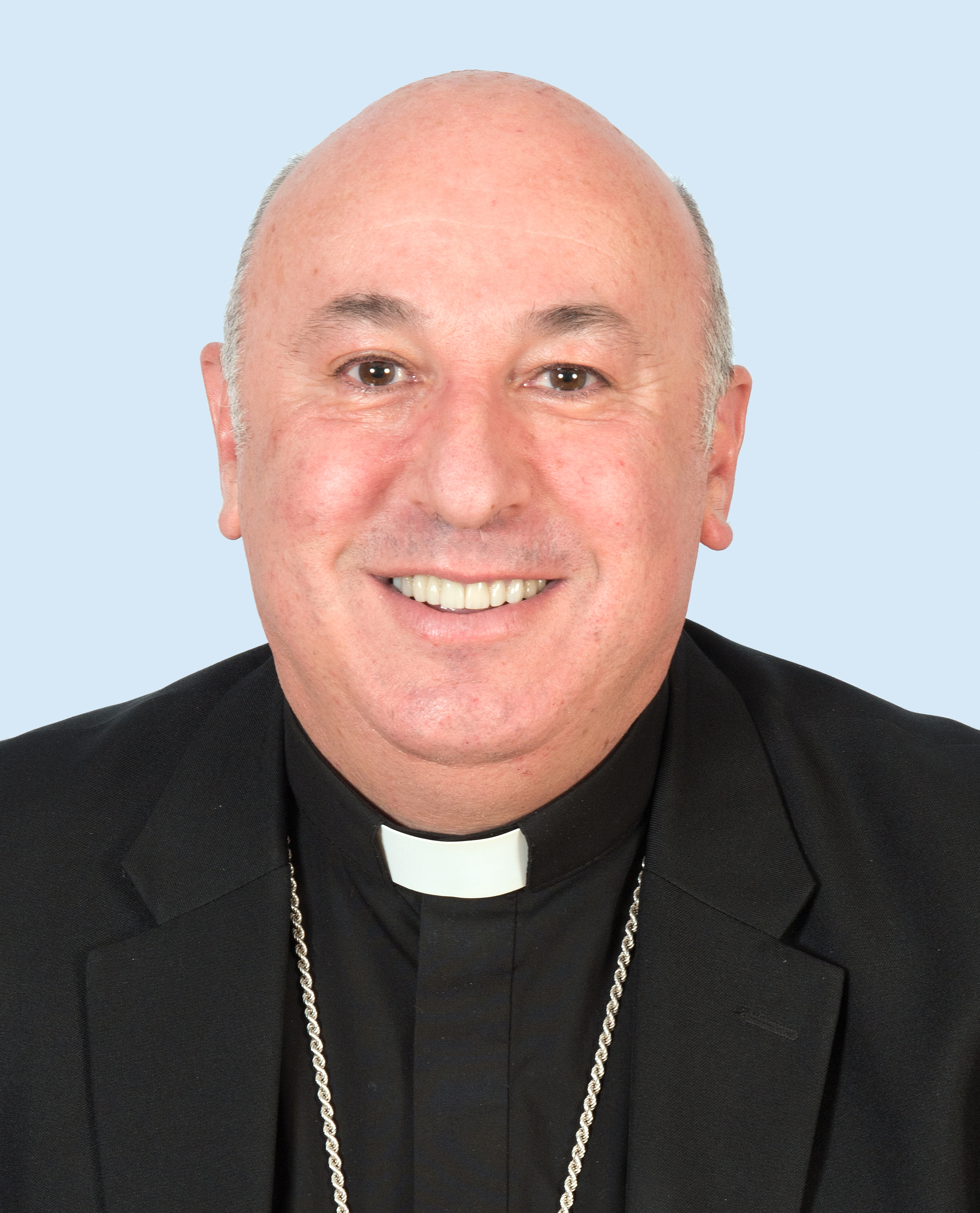
- Church: Roman Catholic Church
- Archdiocese: Granada
- Diocese: Guadix
- Appointed: 30 October 2018
- Predecessor: Ginés Ramón García Beltrán
- Successor: Incumbent

Orders
- Ordination: 9 July 1995 by Bishop José Antonio Infantes Florido
- Consecration: 22 December 2018 at Guadix Cathedral by Archbishop Francisco Javier Martínez Fernández

Personal details
- Born: April 23, 1970 (age 56) Villafranca de Córdoba, Spain
- Education: Pontifical Lateran University
- Coat of arms

Bishop Francisco Jesús Orozco Mengibar is the current bishop of the Roman Catholic Diocese of Guadix, Spain.

== Early life and education ==
Francisco was born on 23 April 1970 in Villafranca de Córdoba, Spain. He has acquired bachelor's degree in theology from Comillas Pontifical University, Madrid and a licentiate and a doctorate in fundamental theology from Pontifical Lateran University.

== Priesthood ==
Francisco received his priestly ordination from Bishop José Antonio Infantes Florido on 9 July 1995.

== Episcopate ==
On 30 October 2018, Pope Francis appointed Francisco bishop of the Roman Catholic Diocese of Guadix. His episcopal ordination took place on 22 December 2018 at Guadix Cathedral.
