= Alvaro Moscoso =

Spanish Roman Catholic prelate

Most Reverend Alvaro Moscoso
- Bishop of Zamora
- Church: Catholic Church
- Diocese: Diocese of Zamora
- In office: 1561–1564
- Predecessor: Antonio del Aguila Vela y Paz
- Successor: Juan Manuel de la Cerda
- Previous post: Bishop of Pamplona (1550–1561)

Personal details
- Born: 1493 Cáceres, Spain
- Died: 1564 (age 71) Zamora, Spain

Alvaro Moscoso (1493 – 1564) was a Roman Catholic prelate who served as Bishop of Zamora (1561–1564) and Bishop of Pamplona (1550–1561).

== Biography ==
Alvaro Moscoso was born in Cáceres, Spain in 1493. On 27 June 1550, he was appointed during the papacy of Pope Julius III as Bishop of Pamplona. On 2 June 1561, he was appointed during the papacy of Pope Pius IV as Bishop of Zamora. He served as Bishop of Zamora until his death in 1564.

== External links and additional sources ==
- Cheney, David M. "Diocese of Zamora". Catholic-Hierarchy.org. (for Chronology of Bishops) ^{[self-published]}
- Chow, Gabriel. "Diocese of Zamora (Spain)". GCatholic.org. (for Chronology of Bishops) ^{[self-published]}

Catholic Church titles
Preceded by Antonio de Fonseca,	Bishop of Pamplona; 1550–1561	Succeeded by Diego Ramírez Sedeño de Fuenleal
Preceded by Antonio del Aguila Vela y Paz	Bishop of Zamora; 1561–1564	Succeeded by Juan Manuel de la Cerda
