= Bernard de Périgord =

Bernard de Périgord (died 1149) was the first bishop of the restored diocese of Zamora from 1121 until his death. He was born in the Périgord, a region in the north of the Duchy of Aquitaine in central France.

As a young man, Bernard accompanied Bernard de Sedirac, his countryman, to Spain and there entered the church of Toledo, where he became an archdeacon. In 1121 he was elected to replace the late Jérôme, also from Périgord, who had served as de facto bishop of Zamora since about 1102. Bernard began construction on the new cathedral of Zamora and reorganised the cathedral chapter. He created a diocesan administration from scratch and began the repoblación (officially-sponsored resettlement) of the region with Christians. All his surviving charters are fueros de población granting rights to, and establishing the responsibilities of, new settlers (pobladores).

Bernard also oversaw the foundation of two monasteries in his diocese, including Valparaíso, one of the earliest Cistercian houses in Spain.
