= Guadix Cathedral =

Catholic Cathedral in Andalusia, Spain

- Cathedral of the Incarnation
- Catedral de la Encarnación
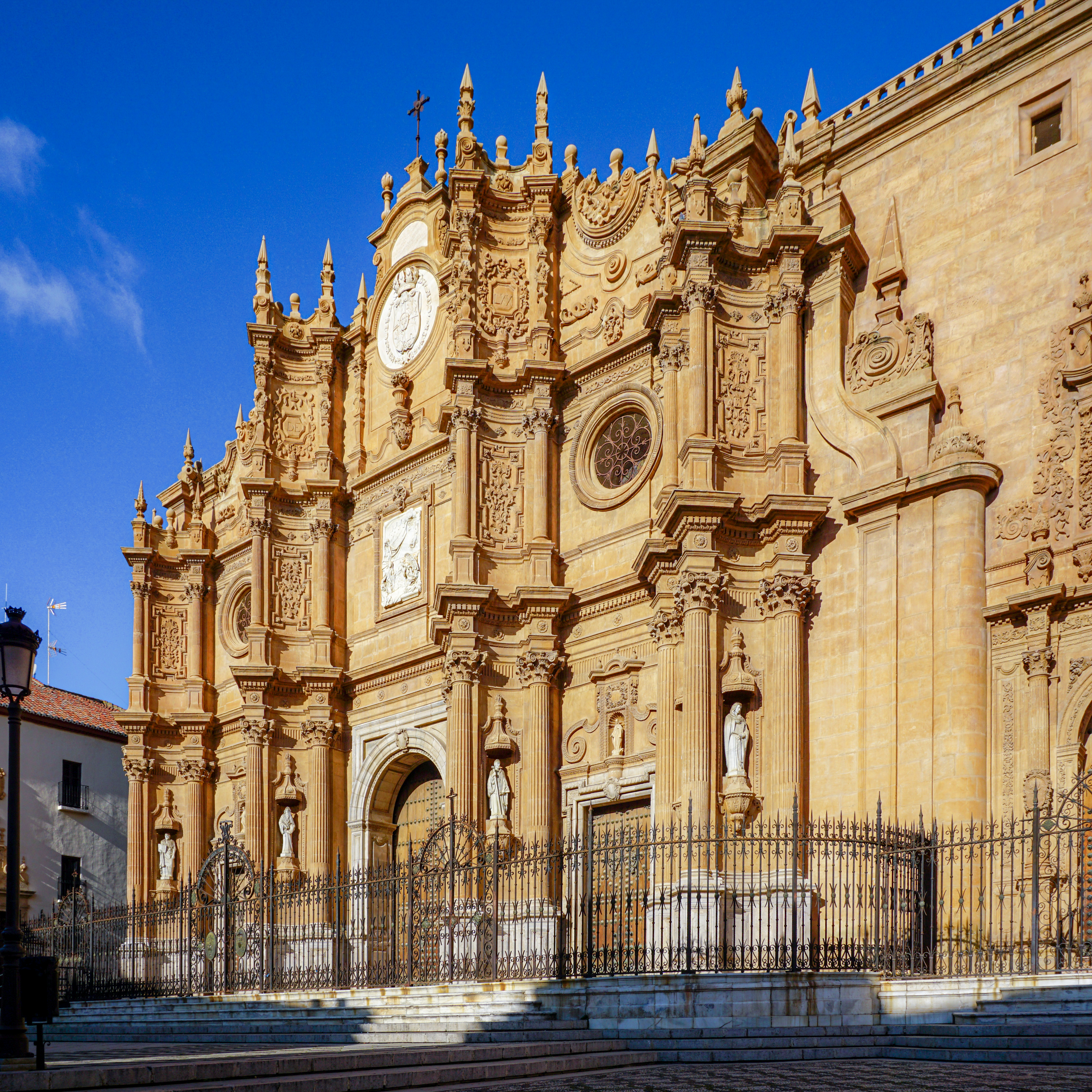
- South façade
- Guadix Cathedral
- 37.3012°N 3.1363°W
- Location: Guadix
- Address: Plaza de la Catedral
- Country: Spain
- Denomination: Catholic
- Website: catedraldeguadix.es

History
- Former name: Church of Saint Mary of the Incarnation
- Status: Cathedral
- Dedication: Incarnation

Architecture
- Architect(s): Diego de Siloé, Francisco Roldán, Francisco Antero, Blas Antonio Delgado, Vicente Acero, Gaspar Cayón de la Vega, Fernández Pachote, and Domingo Thomas
- Style: Gothic, Renaissance, Baroque
- Years built: 16th—18th century

Specifications
- Length: 67 m (219 ft 10 in)
- Width: 37 m (121 ft 5 in)

Administration
- Metropolis: Granada
- Diocese: Guadix

Clergy
- Bishop: Francisco Jesús Orozco Mengíbar

Spanish Cultural Heritage
- Type: Non-movable
- Criteria: Monument
- Designated: 3 June 1931
- Reference no.: RI-51-0000595

The Cathedral of the Incarnation (Spanish: Catedral de la Encarnación) is a Roman Catholic cathedral in Guadix, Spain. Construction began during the 16th century and was completed by the mid-18th century. It is the seat of the Diocese of Guadix.

== Location and historical context ==
Guadix is believed to be one of the oldest diocesan seats in Spain; tradition has it that the diocese was founded by Saint Torquatus of Acci in the first century AD. The cathedral sits on the site of an earlier Hispano-Visigothic church extant in the 10th century, and which functioned during the Islamic period as a mosque.

During the Reconquista, Guadix was captured by the Christian forces in 1489, and the Hispano-Visigothic church was reestablished as the seat of a bishopric. It was given the name of the Church of Saint Mary of the Incarnation (Iglesia de Santa María de la Encarnación), was made a cathedral by a bull of Pope Innocent VIII, and was somewhat expanded under the direction of Pedro de Morales.

Plans were made to replace the old church with a Gothic cathedral as a symbol of the Reconquista, but by the time construction began, that style was already considered antiquated. Cardinal Ávalos and others wanted a cathedral more in accord with the style of the times. Diego de Siloé was commissioned in 1549 to develop a design reflecting the influence of the cathedrals of Málaga and Granada. The apse, part of the crossing, the chapel of Don Tadeo and part of the sacristy were completed according to Siloé's plan.

=== Construction ===
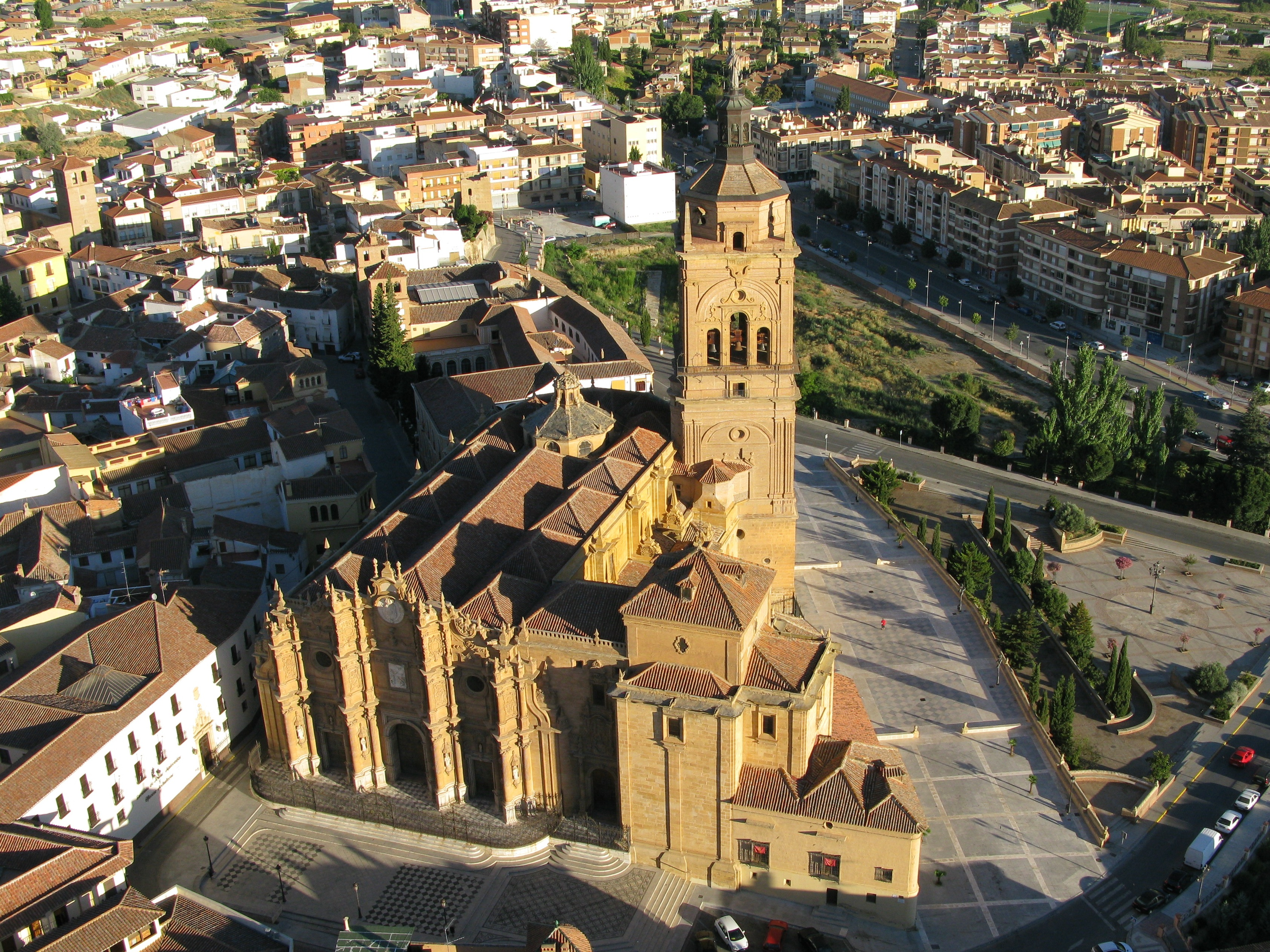
Cathedral from the air

Besides Siloé, Francisco Roldán, Francisco Antero, and others were involved in designing the new cathedral. Siloé planned the main chapel in a Renaissance style, with an alternation of straight lines and curves, with profuse decoration in the classical style and highly developed entablature. Juan de Arredondo was appointed master builder.

The Freyla brothers, Pedro and Miguel, worked many years on a tower intended as an emblem of identity for the city.

In 1574, work stopped for lack of money, and was not resumed until 1594, when Bishop Juan de Fonseca y Guzmán resumed the project.

The work received a new impulse at the end of the 17th century and beginning of the 18th with economic assistance from the king. Blas Antonio Delgado was placed in charge of the new plans, with changes in the design giving more emphasis to horizontal lines. Delgado laid out the general design of the cathedral, the elevations, the doors and the cupola, but in 1714 had to move to Jaén. Vicente Acero took over, reworking the plan extensively, before also having to move on. The city government approached Francisco de Hurtado Izquierdo; rather than take on the project himself, he recommended Gaspar Cayón de la Vega. The strong imprint of Cayón de la Vega can be seen in the latter stages of construction of the building, in the vaulting, the dome, and in the portada de las Azucenas, the front portion of the building, utilising a motif of lilies which Acero had begun.

When Cayón de la Vega left for Cádiz in 1731, the façade was under construction according to his plans, but others such as Vicente Acero, Pachote, and Thomas added pieces that were not in Cayón's plan.

== Architecture ==
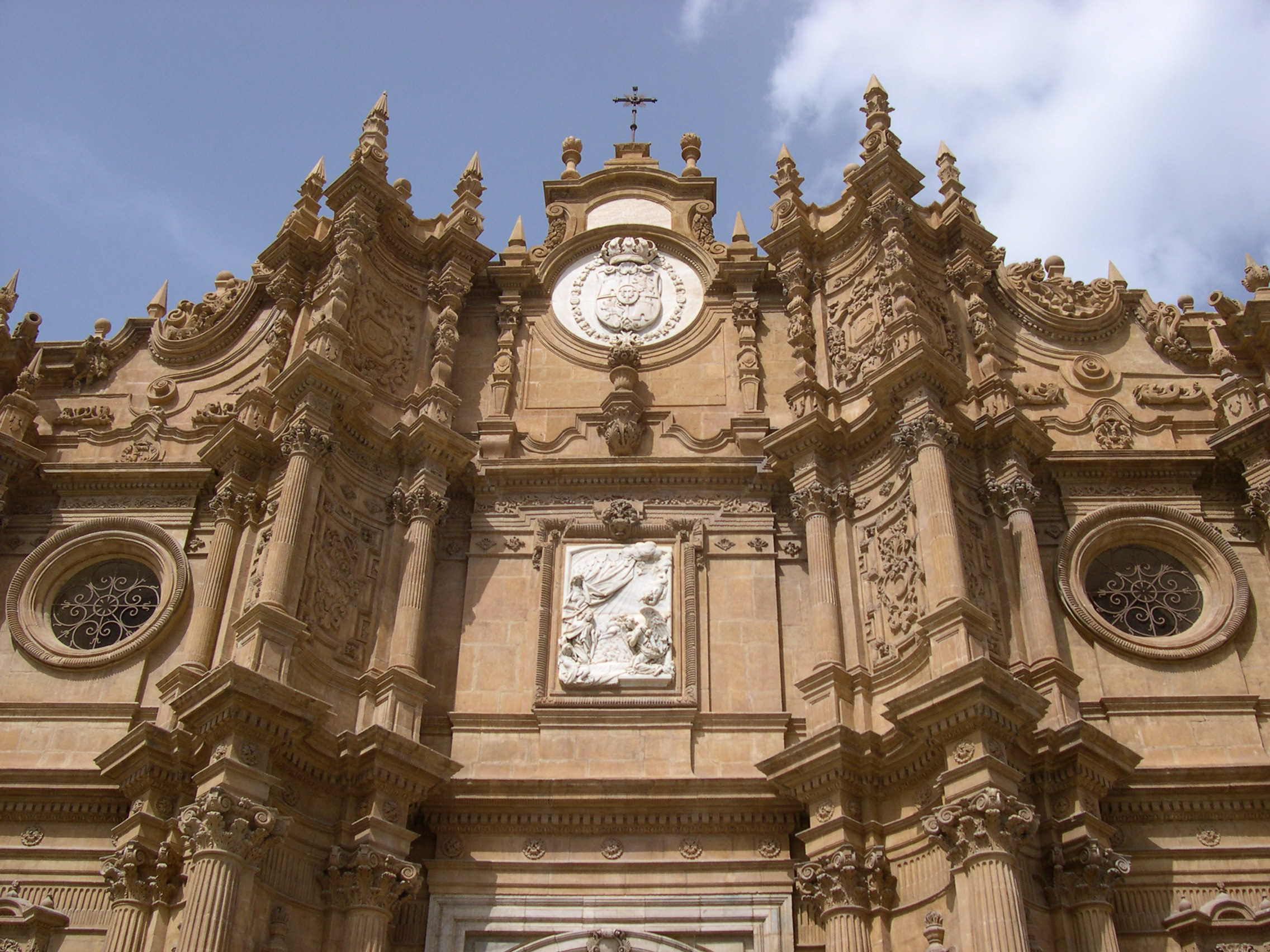
Façade of the cathedral

=== Exterior ===
The façade is a splendid example of the Baroque architecture, with two massed bodies and a pinnacle, with alternating concave and convex lines; the large central span, flanked by two lintels composed of groups of broad-based columns. The upper part was realized by Fernández Pachote and Domingo Thomas; Antonio Valeriano Moyano sculpted the marble Incarnation.

=== Interior ===
The chapel of Don Tadeo shows strong Italian structural influences in its solution to the problem of vaulting arches within a cylindrical structure. Another notable element is the front of the sacristy, with its Renaissance pediment, its entablature, and the arch between Corinthian columns with the coats of arms of the bishops of the city.

=== Bell Tower and Sacred Heart statue ===
The construction of the bell tower began by 1559 and was completed in 1863. It is square shaped and at over 30 m (98 ft 5 in), is the tallest structure in the city. The top can be accessed after 160 steps of a double helical stair. The top is also surrounded by a balcony that allows 360 degree panoramic views and is open to the public.

It is topped by a 4.5 m (14 ft 9 in) tall statue of the Sacred Heart of Jesus, made by Amadeo Ruiz Olmo and installed in 1945. The statue features a mechanism—restored in 2022 after decades broken down—that slowly rotates it in 12-hour cycles, and a red light on its chest that is turned on every night after sundown.

== Gallery ==
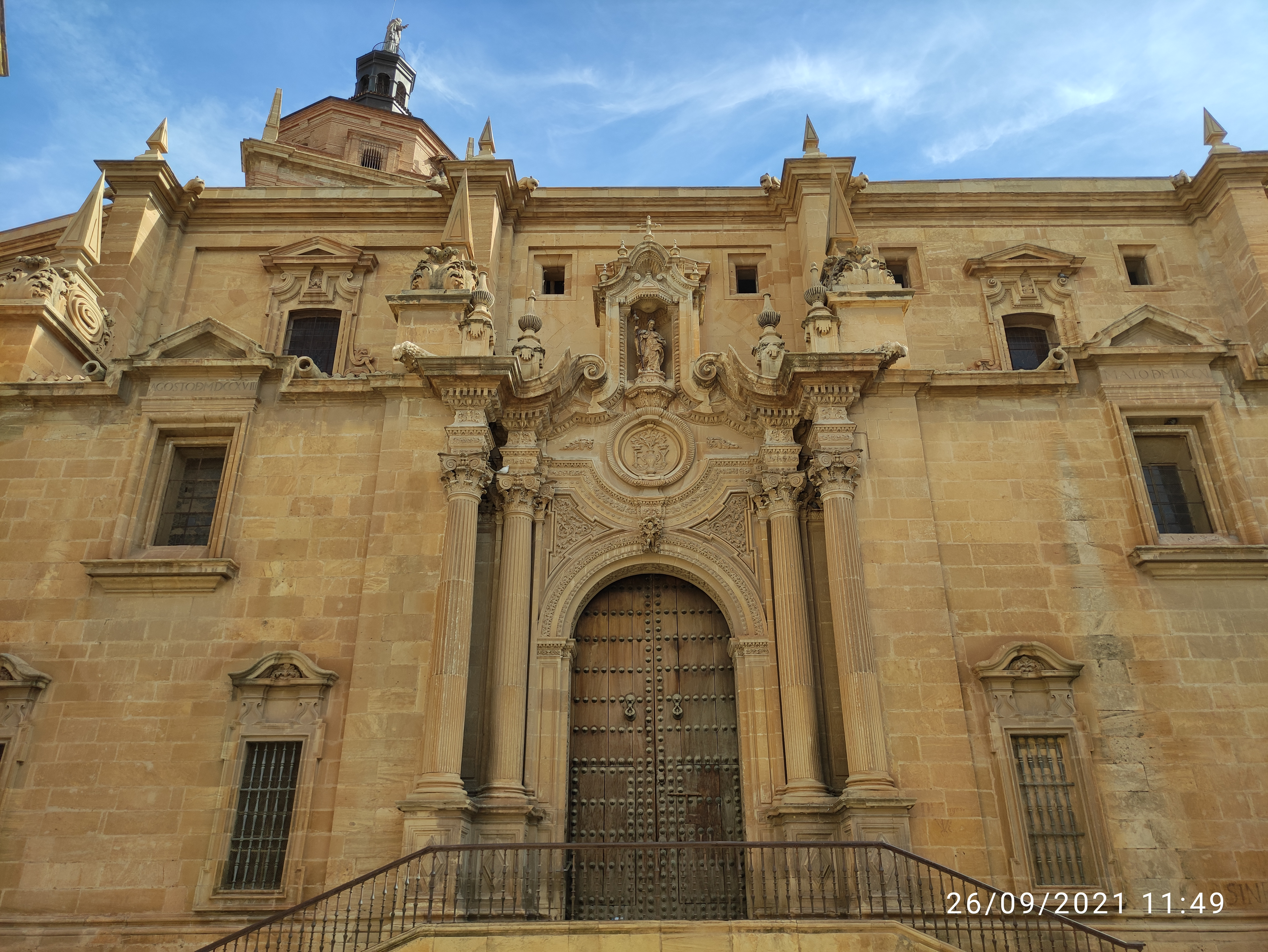
Portal of Santiago

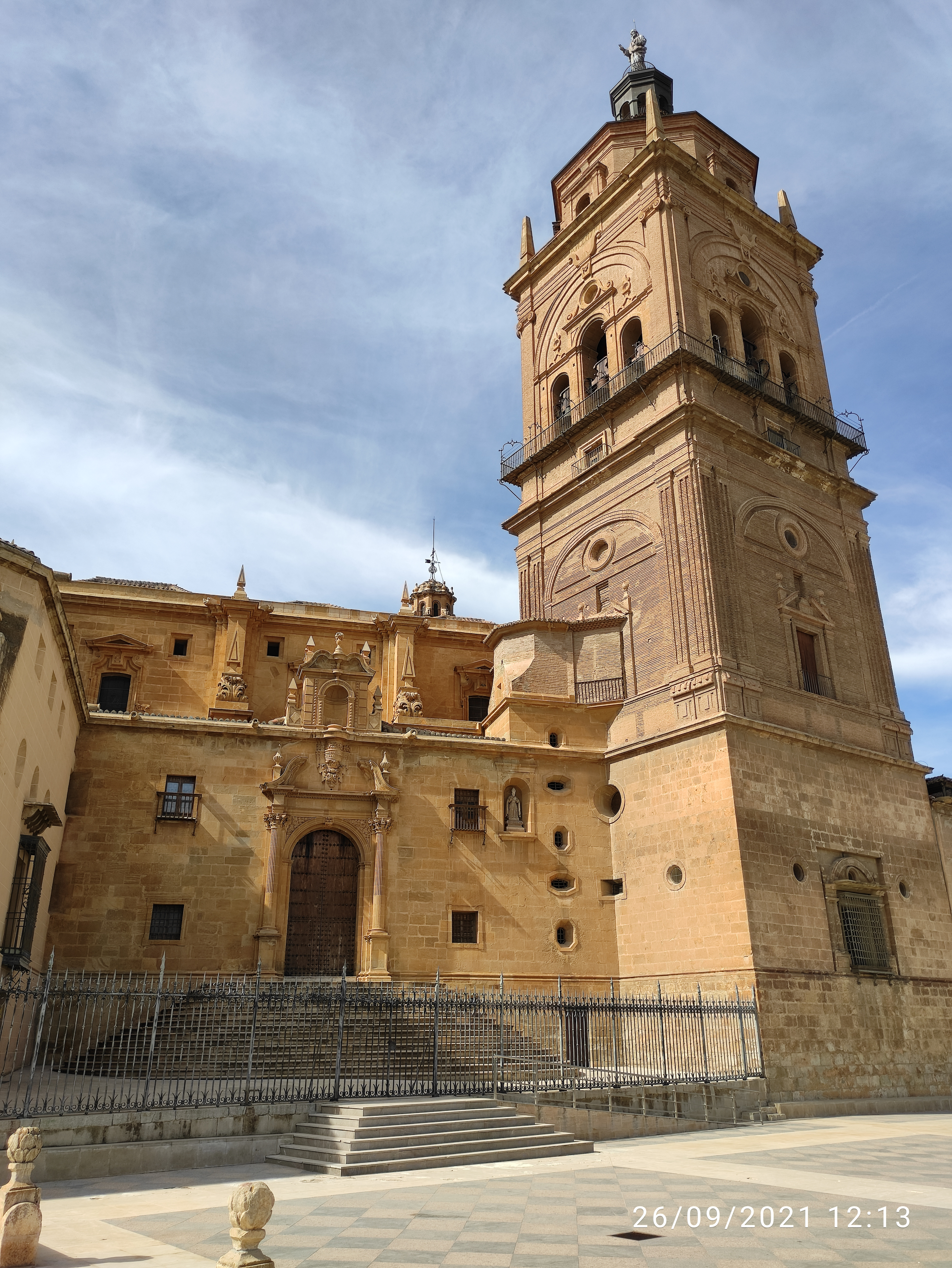
Tower and Portal of Saint Torquatus

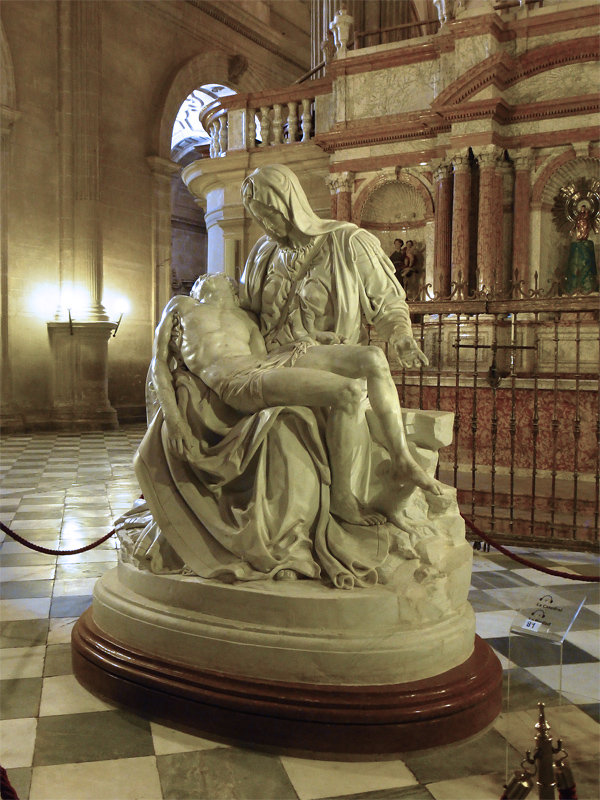
Replica of Michelangelo's Pieta

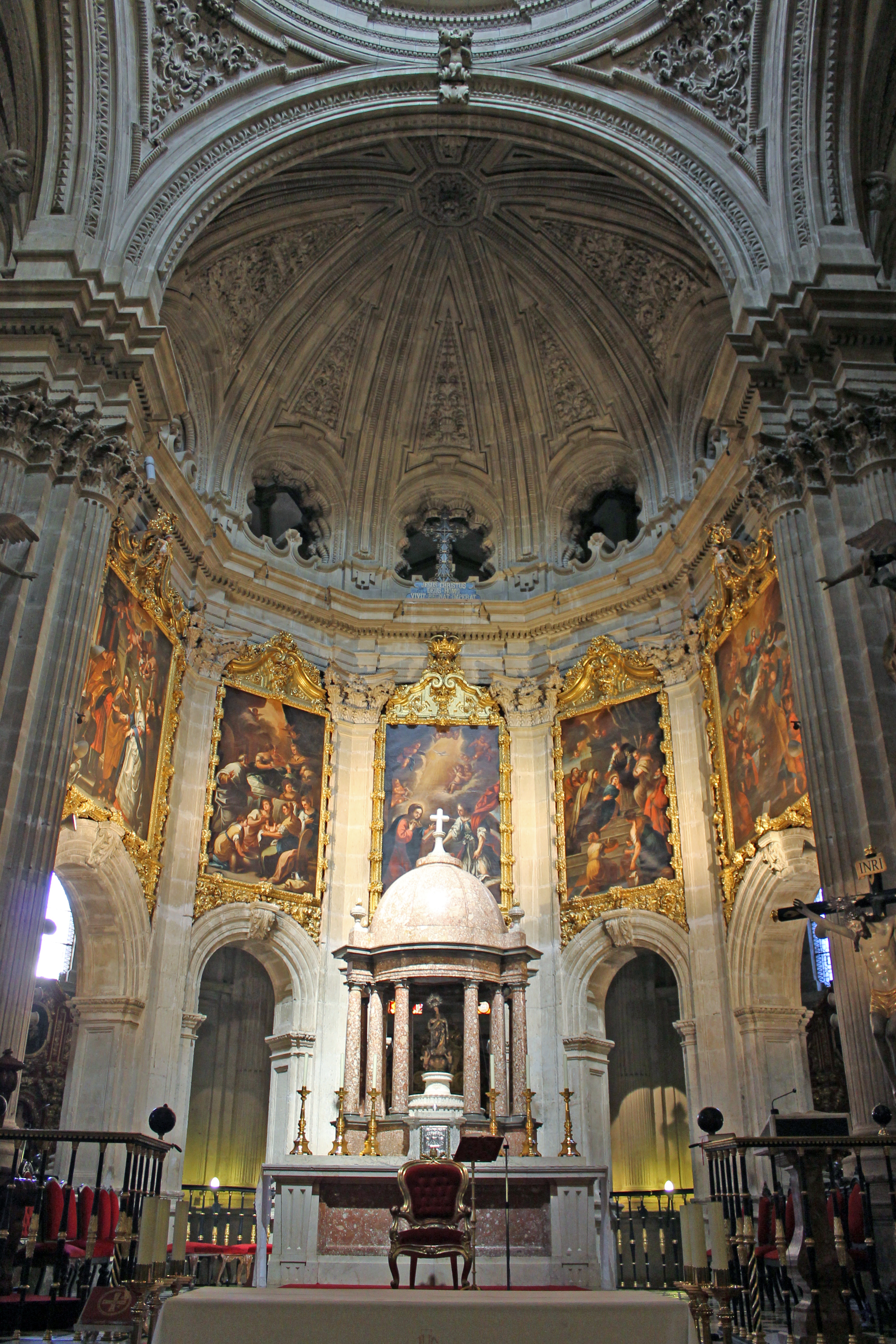
Main altar

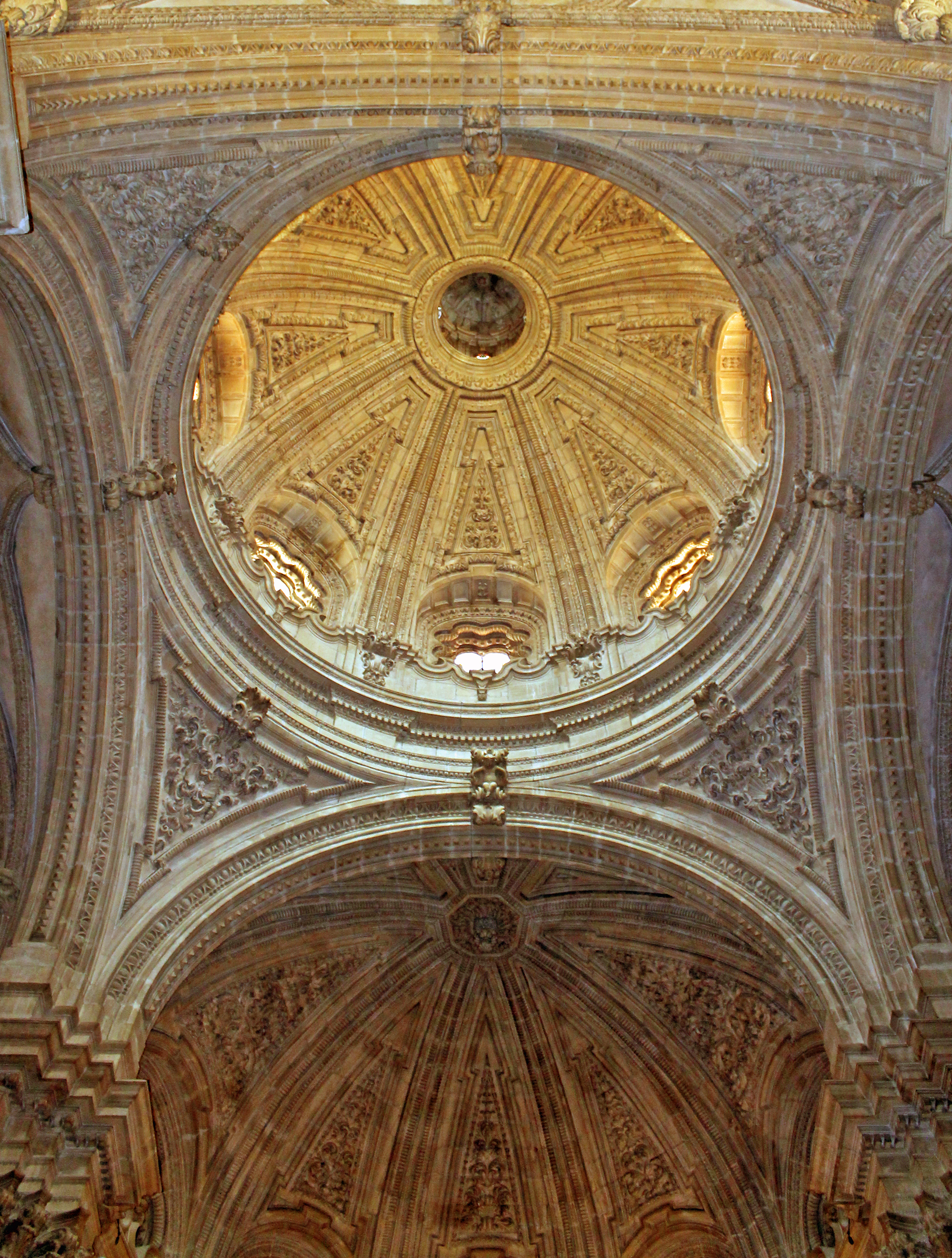
Lantern
