= Antonio del Aguila Vela y Paz =

Spanish Roman Catholic prelate

Most Reverend Antonio del Aguila Vela y Paz
- Bishop of Zamora
- Church: Catholic Church
- Diocese: Diocese of Zamora
- In office: 1546–1560
- Predecessor: Pedro Manuel
- Successor: Alvaro Moscoso
- Previous post: Bishop of Guadix (1537–1546)

Personal details
- Born: 1480 Ciudad Rodrigo, Spain
- Died: 1560 (age 80) Zamora, Spain

Antonio del Aguila Vela y Paz (1480 – 1560) was a Roman Catholic prelate who served as Bishop of Zamora (1546–1560) and Bishop of Guadix (1537–1546).

== Biography ==
Antonio del Aguila Vela y Paz was born in Ciudad Rodrigo, Spain in 1480. On 11 April 1537, he was appointed during the papacy of Pope Paul III as Bishop of Guadix. On 9 April 1546, he was appointed during the papacy of Pope Paul III as Bishop of Zamora. He served as Bishop of Zamora until his death in 1560.

== External links and additional sources ==
- Cheney, David M. "Diocese of Guadix". Catholic-Hierarchy.org. (for Chronology of Bishops) ^{[self-published]}
- Chow, Gabriel. "Diocese of Guadix". GCatholic.org. (for Chronology of Bishops) ^{[self-published]}
- Cheney, David M. "Diocese of Zamora". Catholic-Hierarchy.org. (for Chronology of Bishops) ^{[self-published]}
- Chow, Gabriel. "Diocese of Zamora (Spain)". GCatholic.org. (for Chronology of Bishops) ^{[self-published]}

Catholic Church titles
Preceded by Antonio Guevara Noroña	Bishop of Guadix; 1537–1546	Succeeded by Martín Pérez de Ayala
Preceded by Pedro Manuel	Bishop of Zamora; 1546–1560	Succeeded by Alvaro Moscoso
