= Gaspar de Ávalos de la Cueva =

Spanish Roman Catholic bishop and cardinal

His Eminence Gaspar de Ávalos de la Cueva
- Archbishop of Compostela
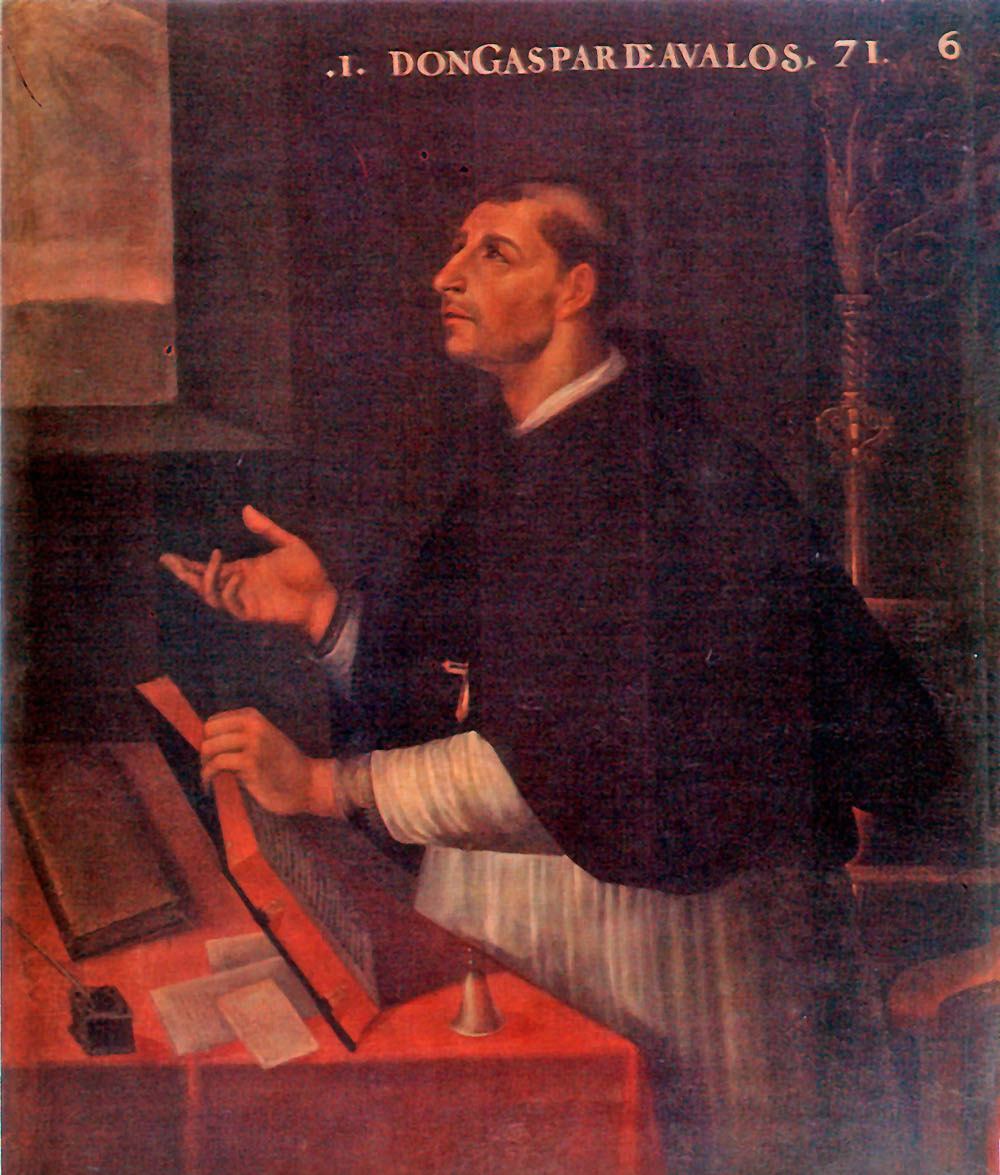
- Portrait by Pedro de Raxis, 16th century
- Church: Catholic Church
- Appointed: 29 March 1542
- Term ended: 2 November 1545
- Predecessor: Pedro Sarmiento
- Successor: Pedro Manuel
- Previous posts: See list: Bishop of Guadix (1524–1529); Archbishop of Granada (1529-1542)

Orders
- Created cardinal: 19 December 1544 by Pope Paul III
- Rank: Cardinal-Priest

Personal details
- Born: 1485 Guadix, Spain
- Died: 2 November 1545 (aged 59–60) Santiago de Compostela, Spain
- Coat of arms

Gaspar de Ávalos de la Cueva (1485–1545), also named Gaspar Dávalos de la Cueva, was a Spanish Roman Catholic bishop and cardinal.

== Early life ==
Gaspar Dávalos de la Cueva was born in Guadix, Spain, in 1485, the son of Rodrigo Dávalos and Leonor de la Cueva.

In Italy, another clergyman member of this family was cardinal Innico d'Avalos d'Aragona.

He studied under his uncle, Hernando de Talavera, Archbishop of Granada. He then attended the University of Paris, receiving a licentiate in theology, and then studied theology at the University of Salamanca.

He lived in Baeza, Alcaraz, and Guadix. On 4 August 1509 he became a fellow of the Colegio de Santa Cruz at the University of Valladolid, later becoming a professor there. In 1517, he became lector in theology at Santa María de Guadalupe. He was also a canon of the cathedral chapter of the Cathedral of Murcia and of Cartagena Cathedral.

== Church career ==
On 14 November 1524 he was elected Bishop of Guadix y Baza. Charles I of Spain and Alonso Manrique de Lara, the Grand Inquisitor of Spain, named him commissary general of the Spanish Inquisition in Valencia in 1525. He was promoted to the metropolitan see of Granada on 22 January 1529. In that capacity, he played a role in founding the University of Granada. On 29 March 1542 he was transferred to the metropolitan see of Compostela.

Pope Paul III made him a cardinal priest in the consistory of 19 December 1544. He died before receiving the red hat or a titular church. King Charles I nominated him to be Archbishop of Toledo but he died before he was preconized by the pope.

== Death ==
He died in Santiago de Compostela on 2 November 1545. He is buried in the Cathedral of Santiago de Compostela.
