= Jerome of Périgord =

French monk and bishop

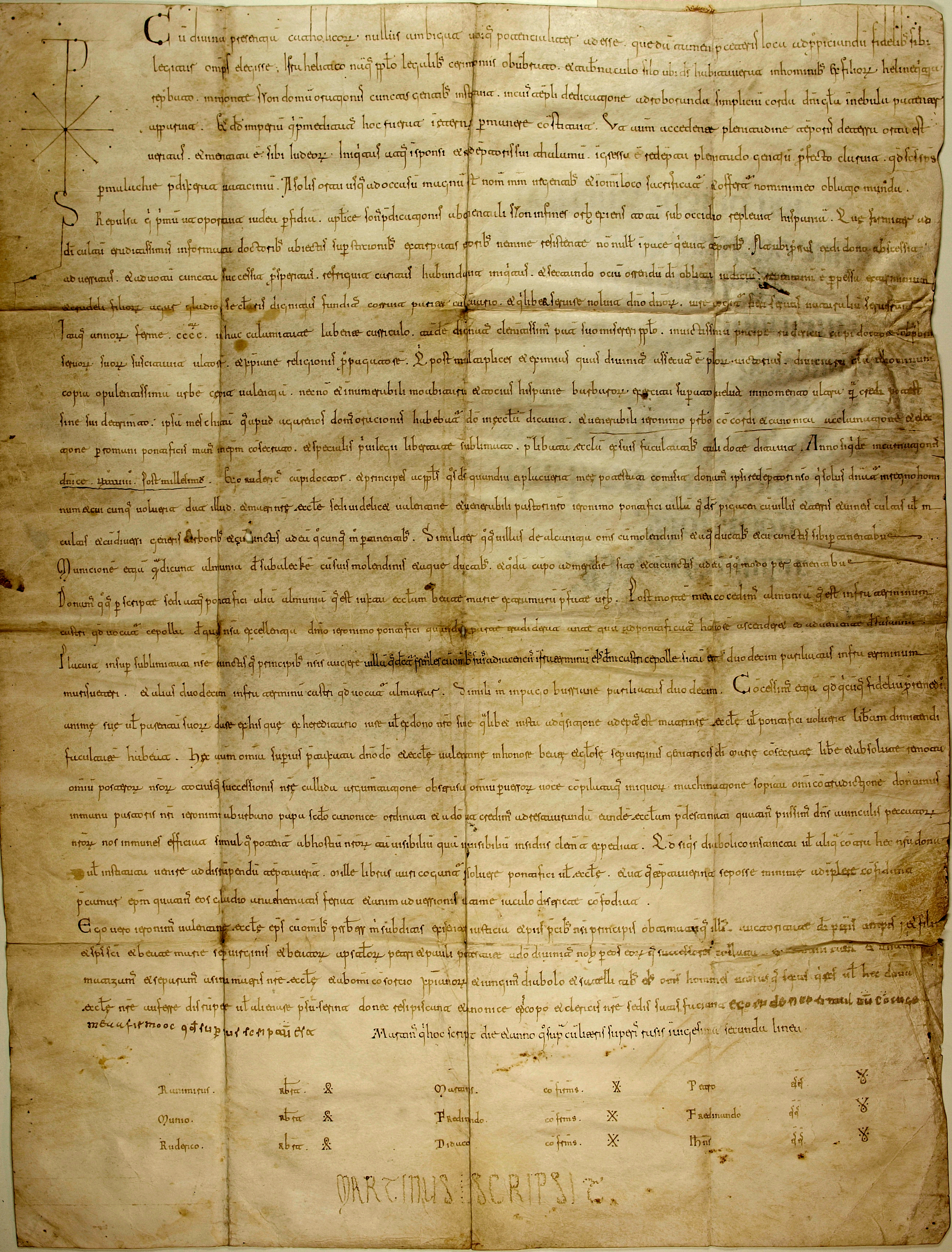
Original diploma of the Cid making a gift to the church of Valencia under Jerome

Jerome of Périgord (Note: The French spelling of his name is Jérôme; the standard Latin form is Hieronymus, but in contemporary document it is sometimes spelled Jheronimus. He is sometimes called "of Périgueux", after the capital of the region of Périgord.) (died 30 June 1120), in Spanish Jerónimo, was a French monk who became the bishop of several dioceses in Spain. He was a companion of Rodrigo Díaz de Vivar ("El Cid"), and in 1097 or 1098 became the bishop of Valencia after Rodrigo's conquest of the city. Forced to abandon it following Rodrigo's death, Jerome entered the service of Duke Raymond of Galicia in 1102 and became bishop over the churches in Salamanca, Ávila and Zamora.

Jerome has been posited as the author of both the anonymous verse history Historia Roderici, (Note: A hypothesis favourably considered by Emma Falque Rey.) in which he is not mentioned, and of the anonymous epic poem Cantar de mio Cid, in which he figures as a warrior-priest. (Note: This is the hypothesis of Javier Sáinz Moreno.)

== Bishop of Valencia ==
Jerome's life before he came to Spain is obscure. According to Rodrigo Jiménez de Rada, writing a little over a century later, he was originally from the region of Périgord in France. (Note: Et Ieronimum de partibus Petragorice, quem tempore Roderici Campiatoris fecit episcopum Valentinum, set in breui ciuitate deperdita, eum dominus Bernardus metropolitanus eius et primas in ciuitate posuit Zamorensi, ut ibi episcopalia exerceret, in qua nondum fuerat nec episcopus nec ecclesia cathedralis. ("Jerome, who was from the region of Périgord, whom [Archbishop Bernard] made bishop of Valencia in the time of Rodrigo the Campeador. But, once. the city had been lost again shortly afterwards, Bernard, his metropolitan and primate, installed him in Zamora, so that he might serve there as a bishop, even though there had never been a bishop or a cathedral church there.")) He was a black monk, possibly at the Cluniac abbey of Moissac further south. His obituary is not listed in the necrology of Moissac, although that of his contemporary and countryman, Bishop Gerald of Braga, is.

It is unclear when Jerome came to Spain, although he was certainly one of the "honest and learned" (honestos et litteratos) French monks recruited by Bernard of Sedirac, archbishop of Toledo, at the suggestion of Pope Urban II. According to Rodrigo Jiménez de Rada, Bernard went to Rome in 1096, where he tried to join the First Crusade only to be turned back by Urban. The pope, however, was travelling in southern France between the synod of Clermont (November 1095) and the synod of Nîmes (July 1096). Bernard was present at Nîmes, and he and Urban both attended the consecration of the Basilica of Saint-Sernin in Toulouse on 24 May 1096. Moreover, Urban visited Moissac on 13 May 1096. If Jerome was indeed a monk of that place, and Rodrigo de Rada's account is accurate, then it is probable that he was recruited during Urban's visit. Thus, it has traditionally been assumed that Jerome did not cross the Pyrenees until Bernard's return to Spain sometime after July 1096. However, Gerald of Braga had been installed in his see by earlier that year and the recruitment of French monks for Spanish work may have begun as early as 1088. Jerome probably entered the cathedral of Toledo as a canon before joining Rodrigo Díaz in Valencia in 1097 or 1098. A document from the Cid's rule in Valencia describes him as "coming from the North" (adueniente de Susana), which must refer to France, and suggests he may have arrived directly from there.

At Jerome's arrival in Valencia, Rodrigo gave him a property at Yubayla (now El Puig), which had been conquered in July 1093. After the conquest of Valencia in 1094, Rodrigo wanted to replace the native bishop of the Mozarabic Rite (Note: The last Mozarabic bishop fled the city in 1092. It is not known if he returned after the Cid's conquest, or if he had died by 1098.) with one of the Roman Rite. According to a later source, he asked Bernard of Sedirac to send him a new bishop for Valencia. If Jerome was sent by Bernard, (Note: Historian Richard Fletcher suggests that the initiative in his appointment lay with Bernard, but if so it was a failed initiative since the papal consecration of Jerome removed the Valencian diocese from Toledan control.) he was sent as a mere priest, not yet consecrated a bishop. According to a document drawn up for Rodrigo, Jerome was "canonically elected with the agreement of the people" in Valencia. He then travelled to Rome to be consecrated "by the pope's hand" (per Roman pontificis manus), becoming thereby the first bishop of Valencia in connection with the wider church in about a century. The dates of his election as bishop and of his trip to Rome are not clear. Sometime after the conquest of Murviedro on 24 June 1098, the old mosque of Valencia was consecrated as the new cathedral dedicated to the Virgin Mary. That same year, after the consecration of the new cathedral, Rodrigo made the church a large endowment of his personal property. The charter of this endowment, possibly drawn up by Jerome himself, survives in its original form with Rodrigo's autograph. Jerome and the priests of the cathedral then pronounced excommunication and anathema on anyone who would deprive the church of this gift. The charter also specifies that Jerome "raised by a special privilege of freedom" (specialis priuilegii libertate sublimato) from the pope, probably a reference the church of Valencia being exempted from any metropolitan authority and being subject only to the pope. The charter implies that Jerome was not elevated to the bishopric until after the consecration of the new cathedral, but historian Bernard Reilly has argued that Jerome's trip to Rome must be placed in the first half of 1098.

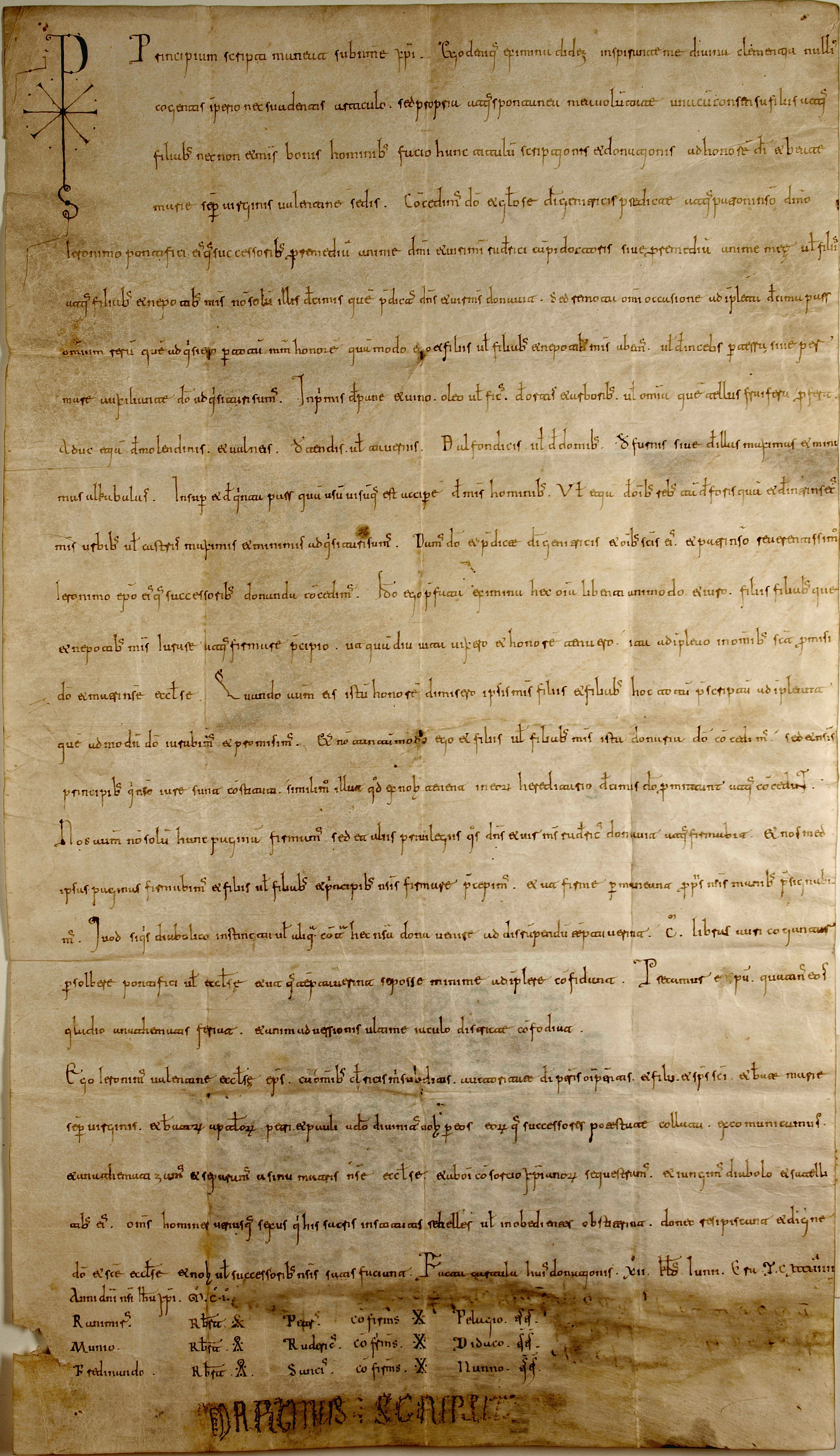
The donation of Jimena to Valencia in 1101

Rodrigo died in 1099 and his widow, Jimena Díaz, took over. On 21 May 1101, Jimena donated a tenth of her possessions to the Valencian church under Jerome. In late August 1101, the city was blockaded by the Almoravid Emirate and Jimena sent Jerome to the court of King Alfonso VI of Castile and León to ask for assistance. Alfonso arrived with an army in February 1102. Perhaps at the royal court in 1101 or after Alfonso arrived at Valencia in 1102, Jerome appears to have made himself a suffragan to the archbishop of Toledo, as the bishops of Valencia had been in Visigothic times. (Note: In a charter of 5 July 1199, Pope Innocent III expresses the belief that Jerome was "subject to the archbishop of Toledo, whose suffragan he originally was and who had consecrated him" (obediendo archiepiscopo Toletano, cuius exstiterat suffraganeus et a quo fuerat consecratus) before he was transferred to Salamanca.) It proved impossible for the king's army to hold the city; Valencia was abandoned to the Almoravids in May. Jerome managed to take with him the two diplomas of Rodrigo and Jimena, perhaps in the hope that he would one day be restored to Valencia. They remain in the archive of Salamanca to this day.

== Bishop of Salamanca, Ávila and Zamora ==
After leaving Valencia, Jerome was in the northwest the next month. On 22 June 1102, Duke Raymond and his wife, Urraca, granted him the two churches that stood in Zamora at that time. This grant probably took place in Zamora. Raymond and Urraca refer to Jerome as "our teacher" (magistro nostro). On 26 June 1102, he is first recorded as bishop of Salamanca, when Duke Raymond and his wife, Urraca, made a gift to his church. The charter dated 22 June formally re-establishing the dioceses of Salamanca and Zamora and placing them under Jerome was forged after Jerome's death and before 1135. It was, however, confirmed by Alfonso VI in 1136. The formal installation of Jerome as bishop of Salamanca and administrator of the sees of Zamora and Ávila may have taken place at the synod of Carrión in early January 1103.

It is probable that Jerome was appointed bishop by Raymond, who was in charge of reestablishing ecclesiastical structures in the recently conquered territory between the Duero and the Sierra de Guadarrama. Jerome does not seem to have personally resided at Salamanca, which was practically a frontier post in those days. Instead, he lived mainly at Zamora. He also supervised ecclesiastical life in the region of Ávila, where a document of 1103 in which some men of Ávila made a donation to the Castilian monastery of San Millán de Cogolla, (Note: This document is possibly a fake.) even refers to him as "bishop of Ávila" (episcopus Abelensis). Documents of 1104, 1107 and 1111 call him bishop of Zamora. There he had replaced another cleric, Roscelin, probably also a Frenchman, who was entrusted by Raymond with the two Zamoran churches at an earlier date. Roscelin seems never to have been appointed bishop. At a meeting of the royal court at Sahagún on 6 February 1105, the king granted Jerome, as bishop of Salamanca, the church of San Martín at Zamora. Jerome seems never to have been regarded as holding more than one bishopric at a time (plurality), but after his death, the dioceses were definitively restored at Zamora and Ávila (1121). Jerome returned to the royal court at Sahagún in December 1105, but he did not regularly stay at either the king's court or the duke's.

Jerome assisted Duke Raymond in repopulating the region between the Duero and the Sierra de Guadarrama, and he probably took sole charge of the project after the latter's death in 1107. In a charter dated 30 December 1107, Alfonso VI confirmed to Jerome all the grants and privileges made by Raymond to the churches under his control. There is no record of secular officials operating in the region of Ávila–Salamanca–Zamora during the remainder of Jerome's pontificate. During the troubled early reign of Urraca, Raymond's widow, who succeeded to the throne in 1109, Jerome briefly considered supporting her rival Theresa, Countess of Portugal, for he was in attendance at the Portuguese court on 1 August 1112. Jerome's ecclesiastical district was a kind of buffer zone between Portugal and the central region of the Sierra de Gredos. Indeed, his sprawling diocese may have formed part of the county of Portugal around this time. Nonetheless, on 4 January 1113, Jerome travelled to the queen's court at either Sahagún or León, perhaps because negotiations had been opened between Urraca and Theresa. In 1115 Jerome spent the early spring at Urraca's court, confirming a royal donation to the cathedral of Toledo (15 March) and participating in face-to-face negotiations with King Alfonso I of Aragon at Sahagún (28 April). On 15 October, Jerome attended a general council of the realm at Astorga and he probably stayed with the royal court for the celebration of Christmas at León. There, on 8 January 1116, he confirmed a charter issued by the local bishop, Diego.

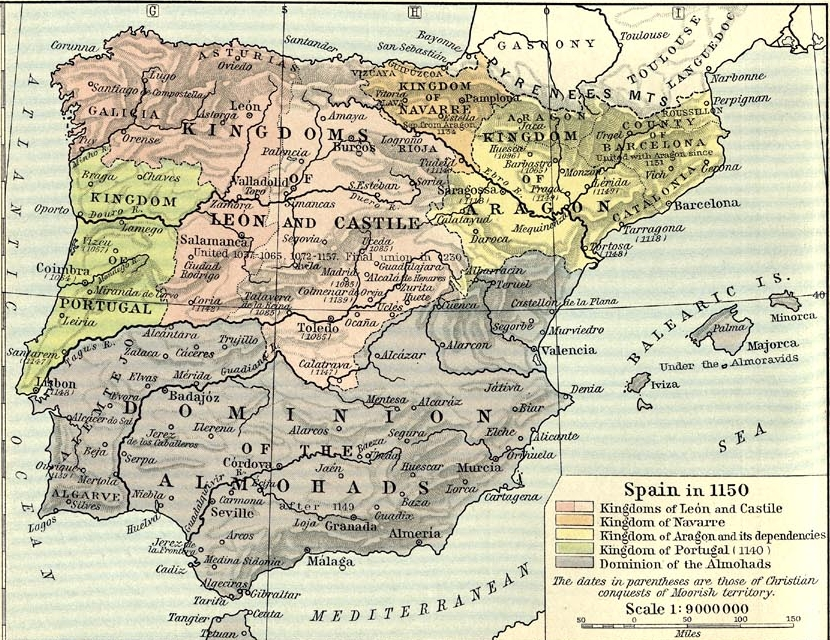
Map of Spain in the middle of the 12th century

On 27 November 1116, Jerome was present to the south of Villabáñez when Urraca and Raymond's son, Alfonso VII, then ruling as king in Galicia under his mother, issued his very first royal diploma. In February 1117, he attended the synod of Burgos held by the papal legate, Cardinal Boso of Sant'Anastasia, and on 24 February he witnessed an agreement between Bishops Hugh of Porto and Gonzalo of Coimbra concerning their diocesan boundaries.

On 4 July 1117, Jerome was with the court of Urraca and Alfonso VII at León, where the queen gave a charter to the monastery of San Isidro de las Dueñas. On 9 December 1117, he again visited the court of Alfonso VII at Sahagún. In the spring of 1118, Jerome, probably with forces from his own province, joined the army assembled in eastern Castile for possible war with Alfonso of Aragon. On 2 June, the queen was holding a council at Segovia, where Jerome was probably present. On 20 November, Jerome had returned to León with the royal court, there to confirm a donation by Alfonso VII to the church of Toledo. On 22 February 1119, he was in Castile to subscribe a royal charter of donation to the monastery of San Pedro de Arlanza. When the queen, still in Castile, issued another charter on 26 March, Jerome did not sign it.

In 1120, Pope Calixtus II ordered Jerome to make a profession of obedience to Bishop Diego Gelmírez of Santiago de Compostela when the latter's diocese was raised to metropolitanate and granted the old province of the Visigothic diocese of Mérida, which was then under Almoravid control. It is not clear if Jerome ever made the profession, but within eighty years of his death it was believed that he had.

Jerome died on 30 June 1120. His successor at Salamanca, Gerald, probably also a Frenchman, was in place before the end of the year. Jerome's countryman, Bernard of Périgord, succeeded him in Zamora. In the late thirteenth century, the monastery of San Pedro de Cardeña claimed that Jerome had been a monk there and was buried there, but these claims are false.

== Sources ==
- Barton, Simon (2011). "El Cid, Cluny and the Medieval Spanish Reconquista". English Historical Review. 126 (520): 517–43. doi:10.1093/ehr/cer144.
- Fita Colomé, Fidel (1894). "Concilios nacionales de Carrión en 1103 y León en 1107" (PDF). Boletín de la Real Academia de Historia. 24: 299–342.
- Fletcher, Richard A. (1978). The Episcopate in the Kingdom of León in the Twelfth Century. Oxford: Oxford University Press.
- Fletcher, Richard A. (1984). Saint James's Catapult: The Life and Times of Diego Gelmírez of Santiago de Compostela. Oxford: Oxford University Press.
- Fletcher, Richard A. (1989). The Quest for El Cid. Oxford: Oxford University Press.
- Linehan, Peter (1992). "Review of Chronica Hispana Saeculi XII". Journal of Theological Studies. 43 (2): 731–37. doi:10.1093/jts/43.2.731.
- Martin, Georges (2010a). "Le premier témoignage chrétien sur la prise de Valence (1098)". E-Spania. 10. First published as "Le premier témoignage chrétien sur la prise de Valence: La charte de donation de Rodrigue à la cathédrale (1098)", in Flocel Sabaté, Balaguer, 1105: cruïlla de civilitzacions (2007), 121–33.
- Martin, Georges (2010b). "El primer testimonio cristiano sobre la toma de Valencia (1098)". E-Spania. 10.
- Martínez Díez, Gonzalo (1999). El Cid histórico: un estudio exhaustivo sobre el verdadero Rodrigo Díaz de Vivar. Barcelona: Editorial Planeta.
- Menéndez Pidal, Ramón (1918). "Autógrafos inéditos del Cid y de Jimena en dos diplomas de 1098 y 1101". Revista de Filología Española. 5: 1–20.
- Reilly, Bernard F. (1982). The Kingdom of León-Castilla under Queen Urraca, 1109–1126. Princeton, NJ: Princeton University Press.
- Reilly, Bernard F. (1988). The Kingdom of León-Castilla Under King Alfonso VI, 1065–1109. Princeton, NJ: Princeton University Press.
- Reilly, Bernard F. (2003). "Jerome, Bishop of Valencia". In E. Michael Gerli (ed.). Medieval Iberia: An Encyclopedia. New York: Routledge. p. 438.
- Reyes Aguilar, Esperanza de los (2014). "Arsonists, Thieves and Clerics: Attacks against the Church within the Dioceses of Salamanca and Zamora during the 12th and 13th Centuries". In Radosław Kotecki; Jacek Maciejewski (eds.). Ecclesia et Violentia: Violence against the Church and Violence within the Church in the Middle Ages. Newcastle upon Tyne: Cambridge Scholars Publishing. pp. 8–25.
- Smith, Colin C. (1982). "The Dating and Relationship of the Historia Roderici and the Carmen Campi Doctoris". Olifant. 9 (3–4): 99–112.
