= Gabino Díaz Merchán =

Spanish archbishop and priest (1926–2022)

Mgr. Gabino Díaz Merchán
- Archbishop Emeritus of Oviedo
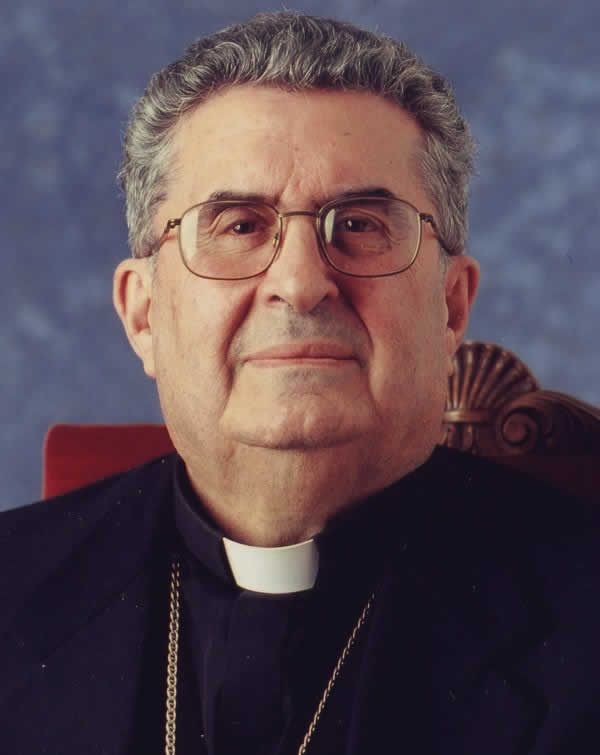
- Church: Catholic Church
- Archdiocese: Oviedo
- Province: Oviedo
- Metropolis: Oviedo
- Diocese: Oviedo
- Appointed: 4 August 1969
- Installed: 20 September 1969
- Term ended: 7 January 2002
- Predecessor: Vicente Enrique y Tarancón
- Successor: Carlos Osoro Sierra
- Other posts: Bishop of Guadix (1965–1969); President of Episcopal Conference of Spain (1981–1987)
- Previous post: Bishop of Guadix (1965–1969)

Orders
- Ordination: 13 July 1952
- Consecration: 22 August 1965 by Antonio Riberi

Personal details
- Born: Gabino Díaz Merchán; 26 February 1926 Toledo, Spain
- Died: 14 June 2022 (aged 96) Oviedo, Spain
- Denomination: Catholic Church
- Residence: Oviedo
- Education: Comillas Pontifical University

Gabino Díaz Merchán (26 February 1926 – 14 June 2022) was a Spanish Catholic prelate, theologian, and philosopher. He was the Archbishop of Oviedo from 1969 to 2002 and the President of Episcopal Conference of Spain from 1981 to 1987.

== Biography ==
He was born in the city of Toledo on 26 February 1926. He entered the seminary and studied at the seminary in Toledo. He was ordained as priest in 1952 and then he went to Comillas Pontifical University, where he studied both Theology and Philosophy, receiving master's degree and doctorate. On 23 July 1965 Pope Paul VI appointed him bishop of Guadix. He received his episcopal consecration on 22 August. On 4 August 1969 Pope Paul VI named him Archbishop of Oviedo. He was installed there on 20 September 1969. In 1981 The Episcopal Conference of Spain elected him as its president. On 2002 he sent his letter of resignation as Archbishop of Oviedo to Pope John Paul II and it was accepted by Pope John Paul II. Carlos Osoro Sierra was appointed his successor in January 2002.
