= Huelva Cathedral =

Roman Catholic church in Andalusia, Spain

- Cathedral of Our Lady of Mercy
- Catedral de Nuestra Señora de la Merced
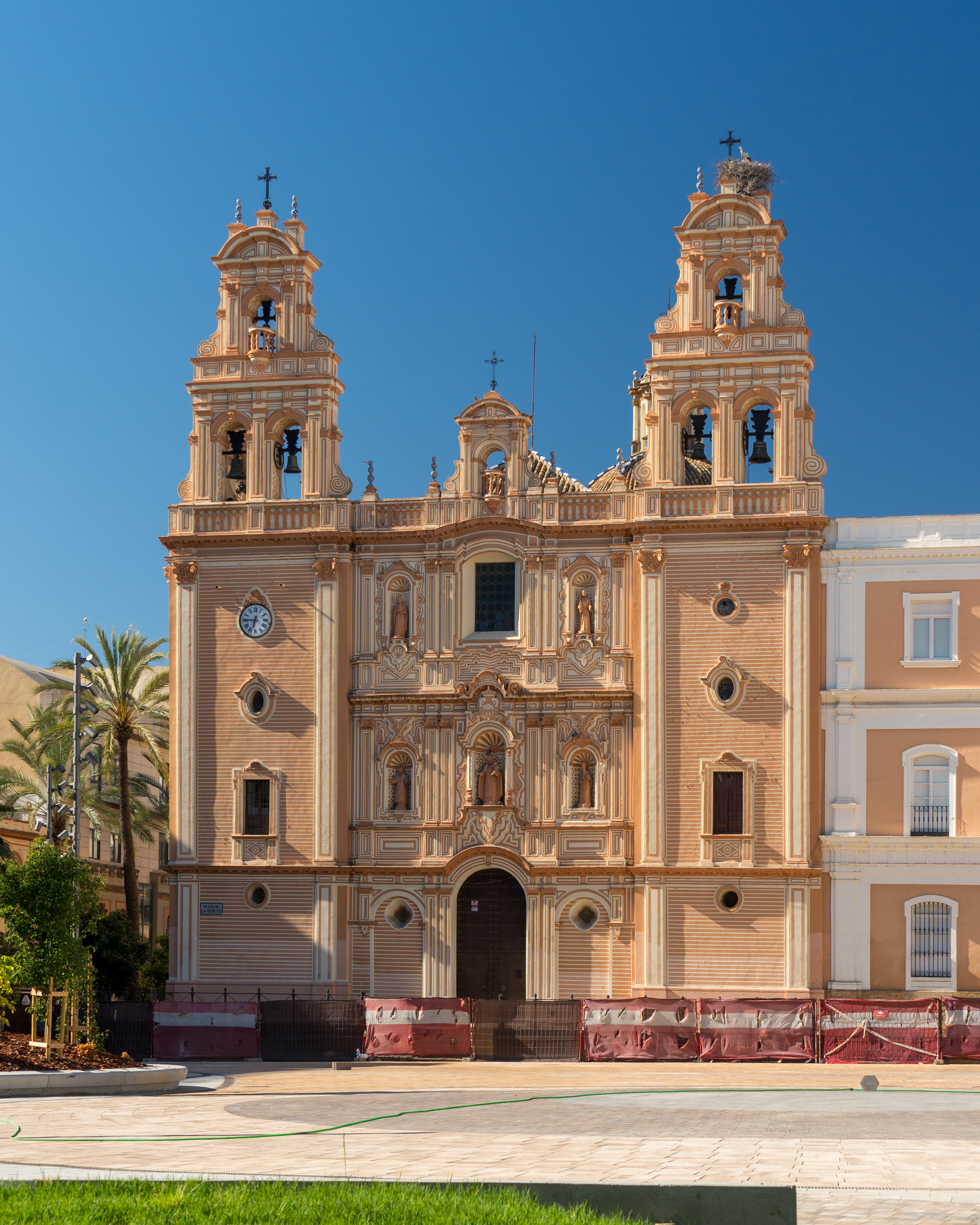
- West façade in 2024
- Huelva Cathedral
- 37.2628°N 6.9525°W
- Location: Huelva
- Address: Plaza de la Merced
- Country: Spain
- Denomination: Catholic

History
- Former name: Convent of Our Lady of Mercy
- Status: Cathedral
- Dedication: Virgin of Mercy
- Dedicated: 15 March 1954

Architecture
- Architect: Ambrosio de Figueroa
- Style: Baroque, Neoclassical, Colonial
- Years built: 1605—1877

Administration
- Metropolis: Seville
- Diocese: Huelva

Clergy
- Bishop: Santiago Gómez Sierra

Spanish Cultural Heritage
- Type: Non-movable
- Criteria: Monument
- Designated: 12 March 1970
- Reference no.: RI-51-0003842

The Cathedral of Our Lady of Mercy is a Roman Catholic cathedral located in Huelva, Andalusia, Spain. It is the seat of the Roman Catholic Diocese of Huelva since 1954.

== History ==
The convent church from the 17th century was destroyed by several earthquakes in the 18th century. A church rebuilt in 1775 in Neoclassical style. It served as the chapel of the adjacent former Convent of Our Lady of Mercy, occupied by the Mercedarian Order until it was abolished during the ecclesiastical confiscations of Mendizábal of 1835. The former convent is now one of the buildings of the University of Huelva.

The two bell-gables were added to the façade in 1915 to accommodate the new bells.

It was elevated to the status of a cathedral on 15 March 1954, a year after the Diocese of Huelva was created as a division of the Archdiocese of Seville.

The church was declared a National Monument on 12 March 1970,

On 28 February 1969 a new earthquake damaged the building considerably, having it closed down for renovations between 1970 and 1977. Restoration works were headed by architect Rafael Manzano Martos.

== Gallery ==
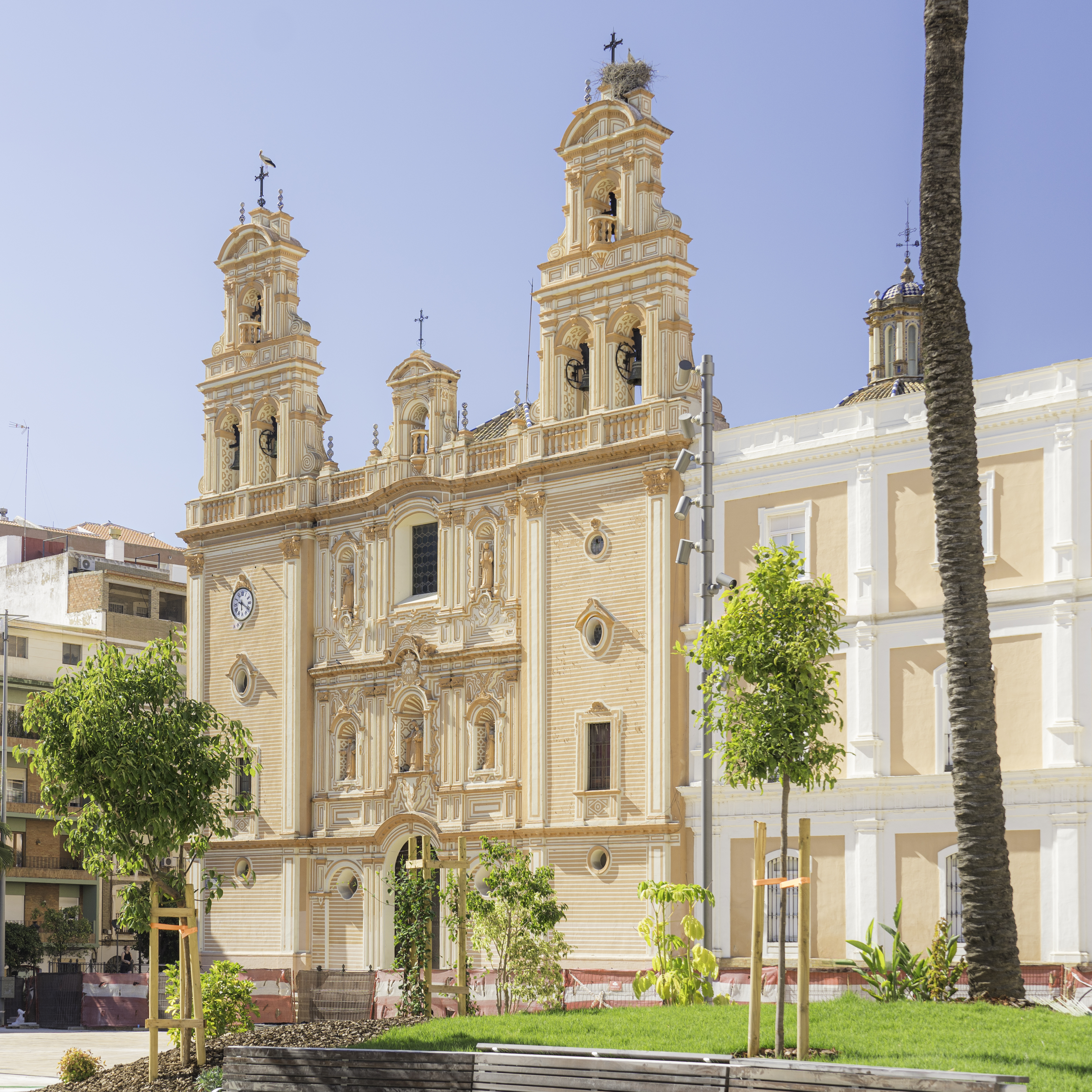
Façade as seen from the Plaza de la Merced

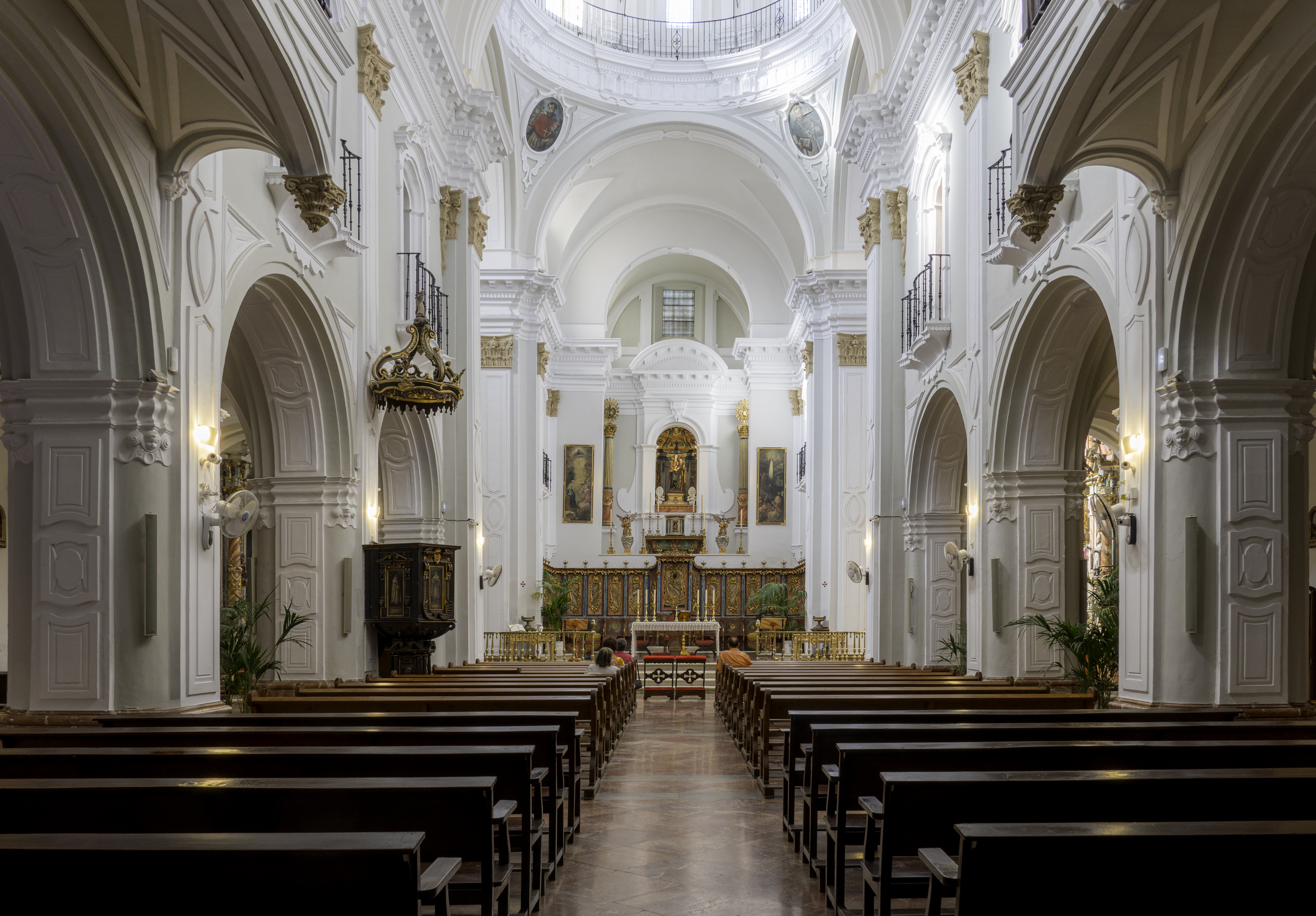
Interior, central nave and main altar

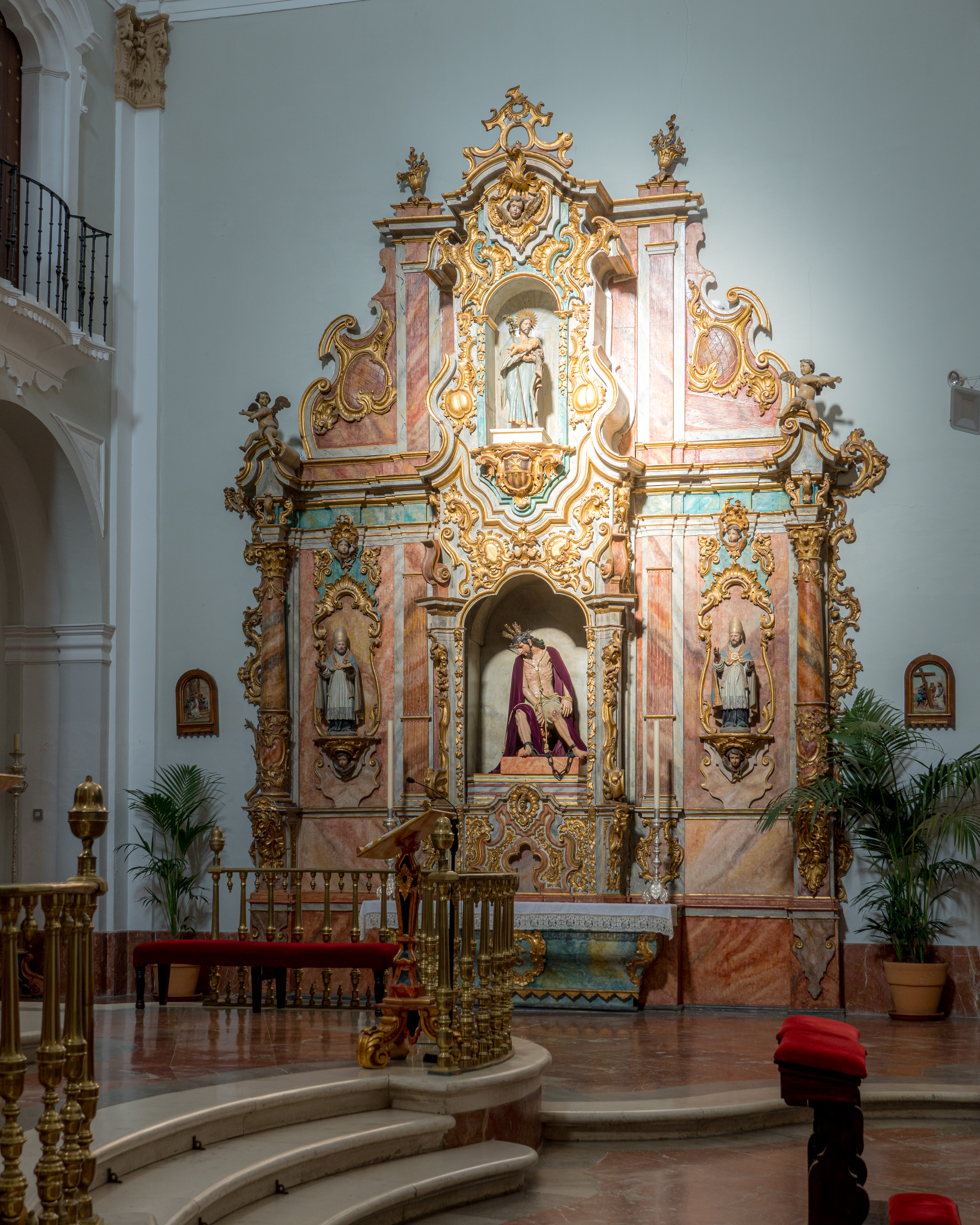
Chapel of Jesus of the Chains

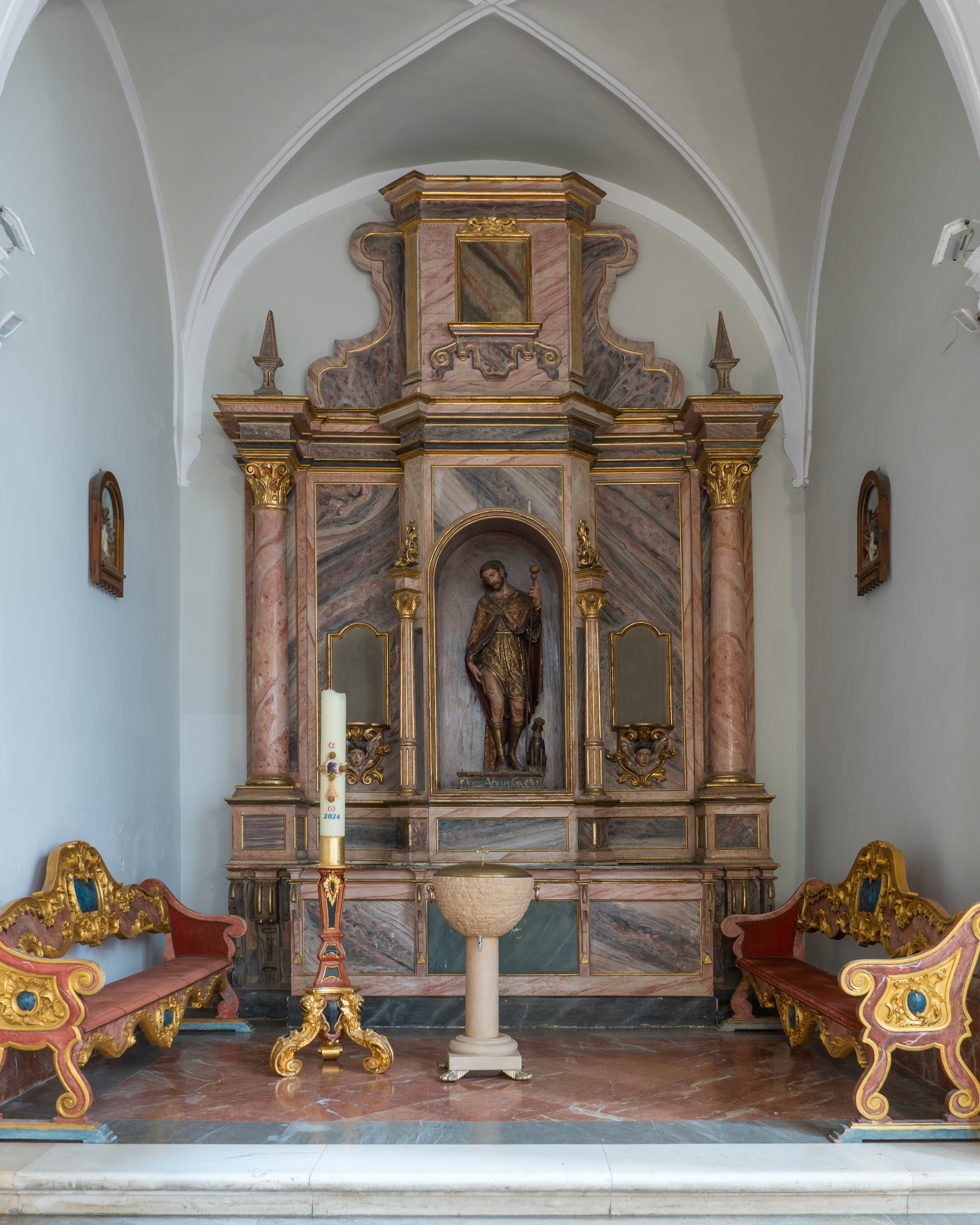
Chapel of Saint Roch

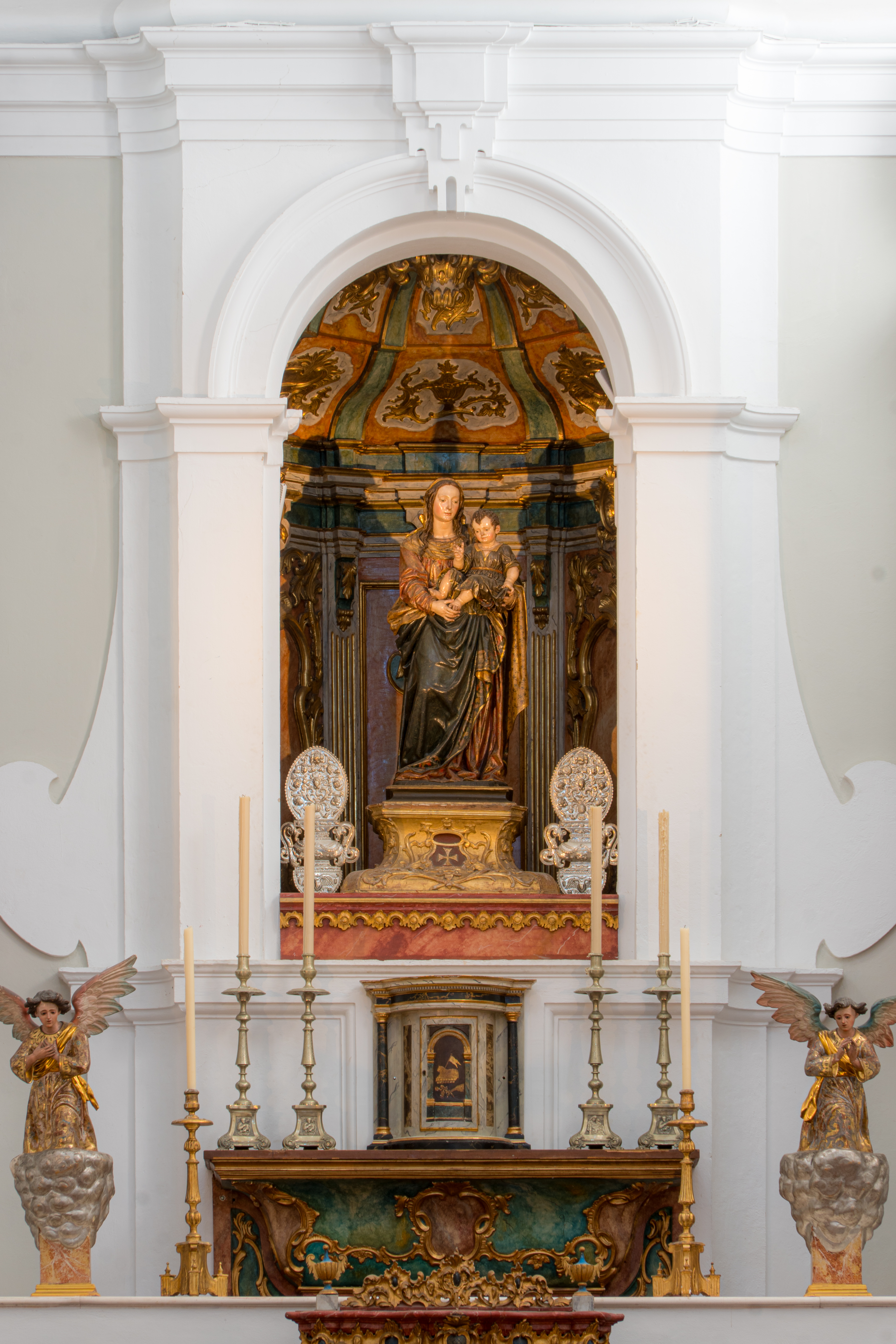
Image of the Virgin of the Ribbon, in the main altar
