= Gregorio Martínez Sacristán =

Spanish Roman Catholic bishop (1946–2019)

- Bishop of Zamora
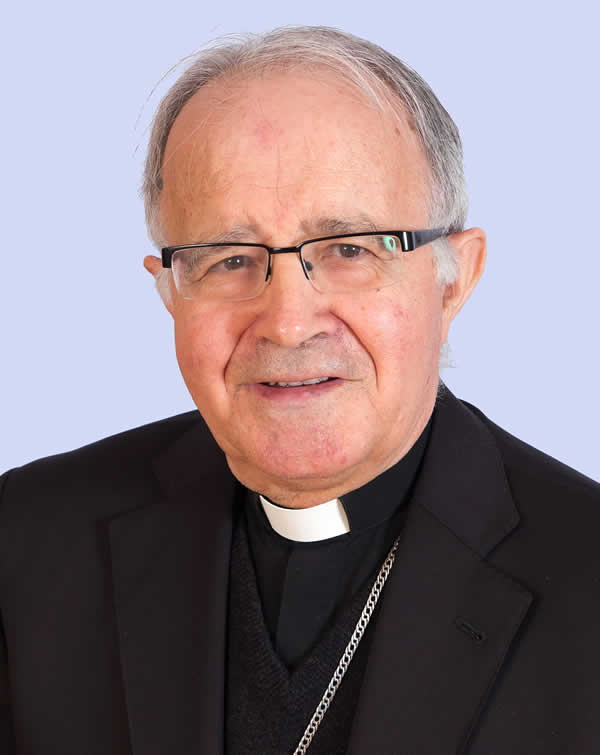
- Church: Catholic Church
- Diocese: Diocese of Zamora
- In office: 15 December 2006 – 20 September 2019
- Predecessor: Casimiro López Llorente
- Successor: Fernando Valera Sánchez

Orders
- Ordination: 20 May 1971
- Consecration: 4 February 2007 by Antonio María Rouco Varela

Personal details
- Born: 19 December 1946 Salvanés, Province of Madrid, Spanish State
- Died: 20 September 2019 (aged 72) Zamora, Castile and León, Spain

Gregorio Martínez Sacristán (19 December 1946 – 20 September 2019) was a Spanish Roman Catholic bishop.

Martínez Sacristán was born in Villarejo de Salvanés, Spain and was ordained to the priesthood in 1971. He served as bishop of the Roman Catholic Diocese of Zamora in Spain from 2006 until his death in 2019.
