= Diocese of Zamora in Spain =

Roman Catholic diocese in Spain

Diocese of Zamora Dioecesis Zamorensis Diócesis de Zamora

Catholic
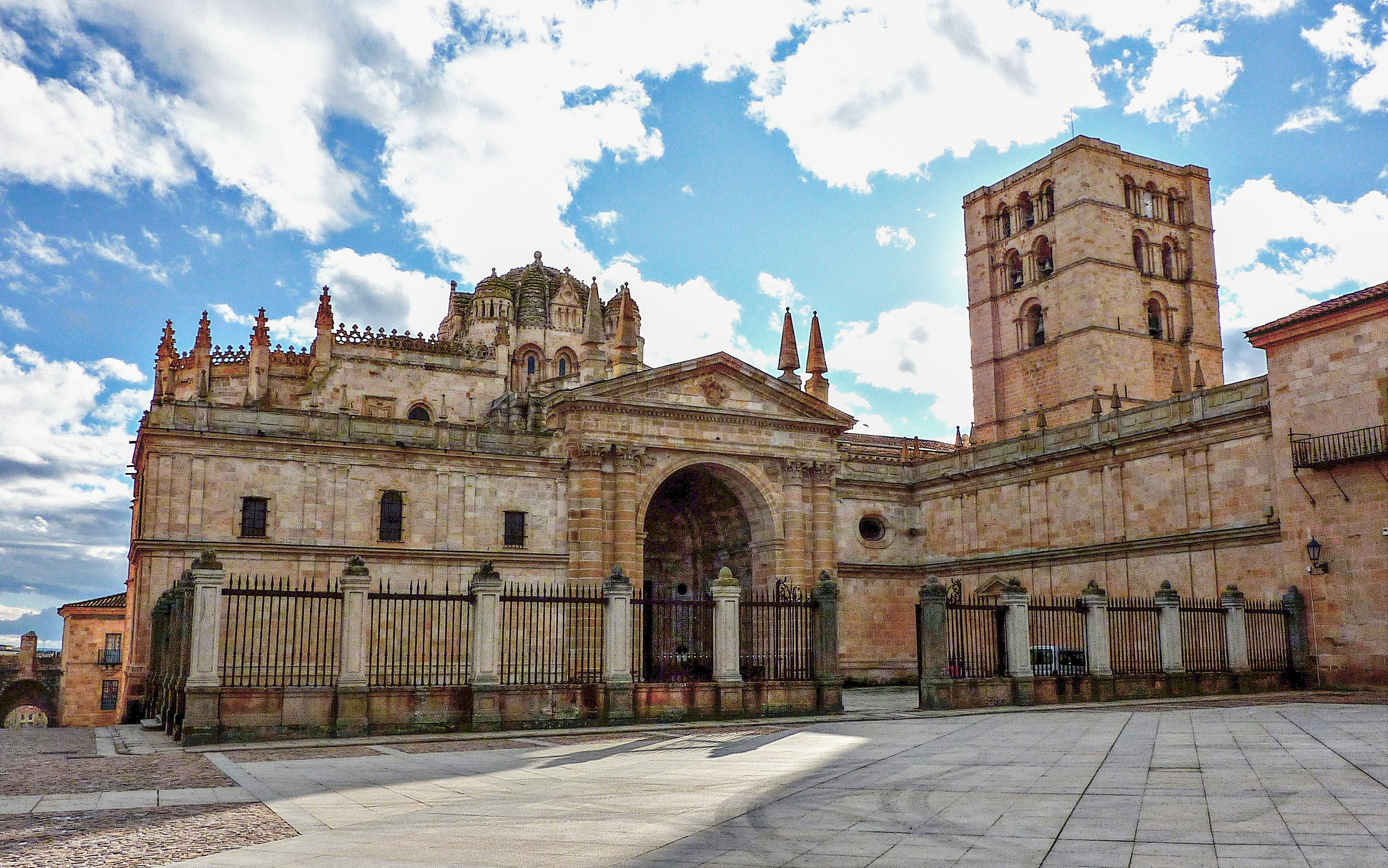
- Zamora Cathedral

Location
- Country: Spain
- Metropolitan: Valladolid
- Coordinates: 41.4989°N 5.7547°W

Statistics
- Area: 6,984 km^{2} (2,697 sq mi)
- Population: Total; Catholics: (as of 2010); 167,100; 165,000 (98.7%)

Information
- Denomination: Roman Catholic
- Rite: Latin Rite
- Established: 10th Century
- Cathedral: Cathedral of St Mary Magdalene in Zamora

Current leadership
- Pope: Leo XIV
- Bishop: Fernando Valera Sánchez
- Metropolitan Archbishop: Luis Javier Argüello García

Map
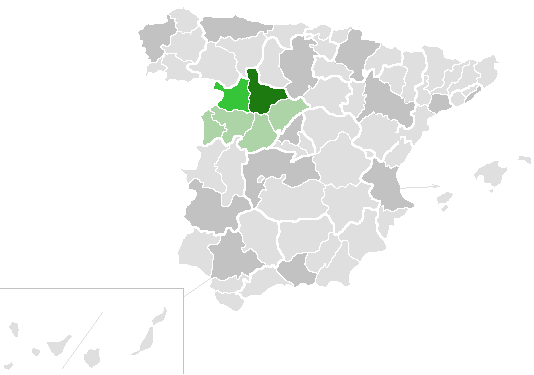

Website
- Website of the Diocese

The Diocese of Zamora (Latin: Dioecesis Zamorensis) is a Latin diocese of the Catholic Church in the city of Zamora in the ecclesiastical province of Valladolid in Spain.

== History ==
- 1000: Established as Diocese of Zamora
- 1102–20: Administered by Jerome of Périgord, Bishop of Salamanca
- 1122: Re-established under Bishop Bernard de Périgord

== Bishops ==
Bishops of Zamora

=== Bishops to 1600 ===
...

- Diego Fernandi (14 May 1311 Appointed – )

...

- Juan Gonzalez Fernandez de Illescas (17 Mar 1395 – 30 Jul 1403 Appointed, Bishop of Sigüenza)

...

- Juan de Mella (6 Apr 1440 – 20 May 1465 Appointed, Bishop of Sigüenza)

...

- Diego de Deza, O.P. (14 Apr 1494 – 23 Jun 1494 Appointed, Bishop of Salamanca)
- Diego Meléndez de Valdés (1494–1506 Died)
- Antonio Acuña (4 Jan 1507 – 23 Mar 1526 Died)
- Francisco Mendoza (3 Apr 1527 – 18 Jan 1534 Appointed, Bishop of Palencia).
- Pedro Manuel (17 Jun 1534 – 9 Apr 1546 Appointed, Archbishop of Santiago de Compostela)
- Antonio del Aguila Vela y Paz (9 Apr 1546 – 1560 Died)
- Alvaro Moscoso (2 Jun 1561 – 1564 Died)
- Juan Manuel de la Cerda (19 Jan 1565 – 4 Jun 1574 Appointed, Bishop of Sigüenza)
- Rodrigo de Castro Osorio (de Lemos) (30 Aug 1574 – 13 Jun 1578 Appointed, Bishop of Cuenca)
- Diego de Simancas (13 Jun 1578 – 16 Oct 1583 Died)
- Juan Ruiz Agüero (19 Mar 1584 – 24 May 1595 Died)
- Fernando Suárez de Figueroa (26 Mar 1597 – 2 Aug 1608 Died)

=== 1600s ===
- Pedro Ponce de Léon (bishop of Zamora), O.P. (29 Mar 1610 – 1615 Resigned)
- Juan Zapata Osorio (16 Nov 1615 – 13 Jun 1621 Died)
- Juan Martínez de Peralta, O.S.H. (13 Jun 1622 – 29 Jan 1624 Appointed, Archbishop of Zaragoza)
- Plácido Tosantos Medina, O.S.B. (12 Feb 1624 – 30 Aug 1624 Died)
- Juan Roco Campofrío, O.S.B. (17 Mar 1625 – 5 Jul 1627 Appointed, Bishop of Badajoz)
- Juan Pérez de la Serna (19 Jul 1627 – 8 Aug 1631 Died)
- Diego Zúñiga Sotomayor (9 Jan 1634 – 11 Nov 1637 Died)
- Juan de la Torre Ayala (13 Jun 1638 – 11 Sep 1638 Died)
- Juan Coello Ribera y Sandoval (11 Apr 1639 – 11 Dec 1652 Appointed, Bishop of Plasencia)
- Antonio Paiño Sevilla (18 Aug 1653 – 25 Feb 1658 Appointed, Archbishop of Burgos)
- Alfonso de Llaño Buelna (18 Mar 1658 – 19 Oct 1658 Died)
- Alfonso de Sanvítores de la Portilla, O.S.B. (27 Jan 1659 – 14 Jul 1660 Died)
- Diego García de Trasmiera (6 Dec 1660 – 26 Jan 1661 Died)
- Pedro Gálvez (8 Aug 1661 – 18 Aug 1662 Died)
- Lorenzo de Sotomayor, O.S. (4 Jun 1663 – 28 Aug 1666 Died)
- Antonio Rodríguez Castañon (7 Mar 1667 – 27 Jan 1668 Died)
- Dionisio Pérez Escobosa (9 Jul 1668 – 1 Apr 1671 Died)
- Juan Astorga de Castillo (1 Jul 1671 – 4 Jan 1679 Died)
- Alfonso de Balmaseda, O.S.A. (4 Sep 1679 – 13 Sep 1684 Died)
- Antonio de Vergara, O.P. (1 Oct 1685 – 7 Jan 1693 Died)
- Fernando Manuel de Mejía (5 Oct 1693 – 15 Jan 1703 Appointed, Archbishop of Burgos)

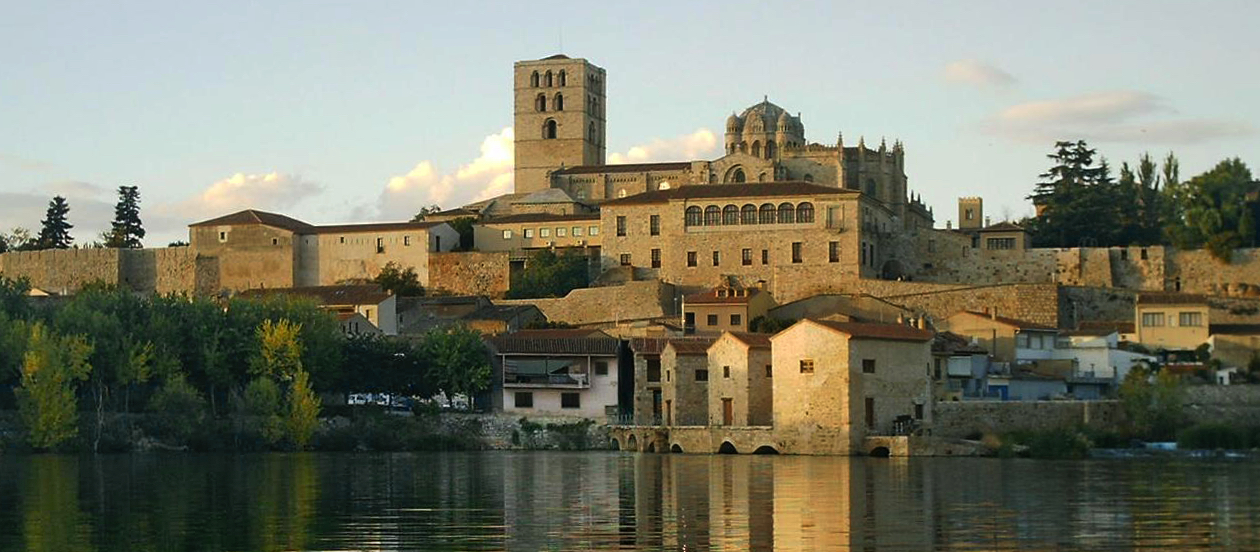
Cathedral of Zamora and river Duero

=== 1700s ===
- Francisco Zapata Vera y Morales (23 Apr 1703 – 14 Jan 1720 Died)
- José Gabriel Zapata Illescas (3 Jul 1720 – 3 Jan 1727 Died)
- Jacinto Arana Cuesta (26 Jan 1728 – 23 Feb 1739 Died)
- Cayetano Benítez de Lugo, O.P. (22 Jun 1739 – 4 Sep 1739 Died)
- Onésimo Salamanca Zaldívar (14 Dec 1739 – 20 Mar 1752 Appointed, Archbishop of Granada)
- Jaime Cortada y Brú (24 Apr 1752 – 26 Sep 1753 Appointed, Archbishop of Tarragona)
- José Gómez (10 Dec 1753 – 14 Oct 1754 Died)
- Isidro Alfonso Cavanillas (12 May 1755 – 9 Nov 1766 Died)
- Antonio Jorge y Galván (27 Apr 1767 – 29 Jan 1776 Appointed, Archbishop of Granada)
- Manuel Ferrer y Figueredo (23 Jun 1777 – 14 Feb 1785 Appointed, Archbishop (Personal Title) of Malaga)
- Angel Molinos, O.P. (19 Dec 1785 – 8 Aug 1786 Died)
- Antonio Puñuela Alonso (23 Apr 1787 – 23 Aug 1793 Died)
- Ramón Falcón y Salcedo (21 Feb 1794 – 28 Mar 1803 Confirmed, Bishop of Cuenca)

=== 1800s ===
- Joaquín Carrillo Mayoral (26 Mar 1804 – 12 Feb 1810 Died)
- Pedro Inguanzo y Rivero (26 Sep 1814 – 27 Sep 1824 Confirmed, Archbishop of Toledo)
- Tomás La Iglesia España (20 Dec 1824 – 20 May 1834 Died)
- Miguel José Irigoyen (17 Dec 1847 – 20 May 1850 Confirmed, Bishop of Calahorra y La Calzada)
- Rafael Manso (17 Feb 1851 – 28 Dec 1862 Died)
- Bernardo Conde y Corral, O. Praem. (16 Mar 1863 – 1 Jul 1880 Died)
- Tomás Belestá y Cambeses (16 Dec 1880 – 6 Apr 1892 Died)
- Luis Felipe Ortiz y Gutiérrez (19 Jan 1893 – 9 Feb 1914 Died)

=== 1900s ===
- Antonio Álvaro y Ballano (25 May 1914 – 31 Dec 1927 Died)
- Manuel Arce y Ochotorena (5 Feb 1929 – 22 Jan 1938 Appointed, Bishop of Oviedo)
- Jaime Font y Andreu (29 Mar 1944 – 13 May 1950 Appointed, Bishop of San Sebastián)
- Eduardo Martinez González (14 Dec 1950 – 31 Jan 1970 Resigned)
- Ramón Buxarrais Ventura (16 Aug 1971 – 13 Apr 1973 Appointed, Bishop of Malaga)
- Eduardo Poveda Rodriguez (11 Oct 1976 – 17 Oct 1991 Resigned)
- Juan María Uriarte Goiricelaya (17 Oct 1991 – 13 Jan 2000 Appointed, Bishop of San Sebastián)

=== 2000s ===
- Casimiro López Llorente (2 February 2001 – 25 April 2006 Appointed, Bishop of Segorbe-Castellón de la Plana)
- Gregorio Martínez Sacristán (15 December 2006 – 20 September 2019 Died)
- Fernando Valera Sánchez (30 October 2020 appointed)

== See also ==
- Roman Catholicism in Spain
- Roman Catholic Diocese of León in Spain
- Kingdom of León
- Leonese language

== Sources ==
- GCatholic.org
- Catholic Hierarchy
- Diocese website
