= Ignacio Noguer Carmona =

Spanish bishop (1931–2019)

- Bishop of Huelva
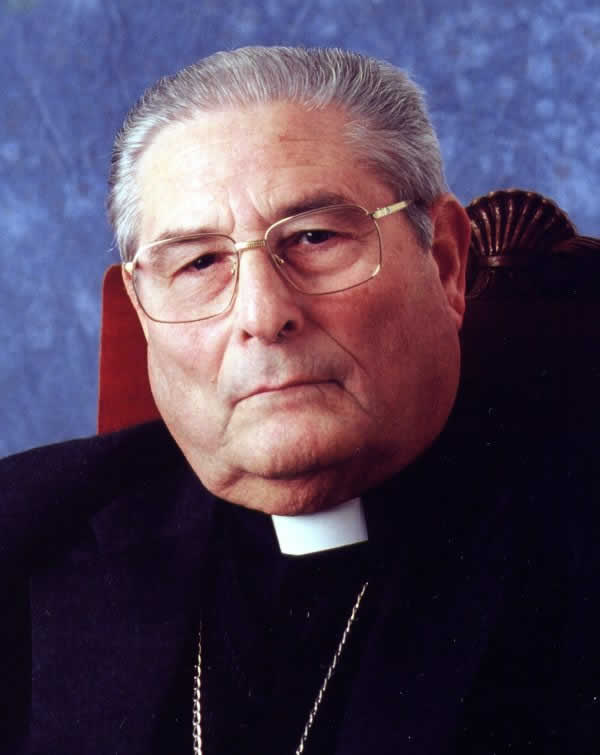
- Church: Catholic Church
- Diocese: Diocese of Huelva
- In office: 27 October 1993 – 17 July 2006
- Predecessor: Rafael González Moralejo
- Successor: José Vilaplana
- Previous posts: Coadjutor Bishop of Huelva (1990-1993); Bishop of Guadix (1976-1990)

Orders
- Ordination: 17 June 1956
- Consecration: 17 October 1976 by José Bueno y Monreal

Personal details
- Born: 13 January 1931 Seville, Province of Seville, Kingdom of Spain
- Died: 3 October 2019 (aged 88) Huelva, Andalusia, Spain

Ignacio Noguer Carmona (13 January 1931 – 3 October 2019) was a Spanish Roman Catholic bishop.

Noguer Carmona was born in Seville, Spain and was ordained to the priesthood in 1956. He served as bishop of the Roman Catholic Diocese of Guadix, Spain from 1976 to 1990. He then served as coadjutor bishop of the Roman Catholic Diocese of Huelva, Spain from 1990 to 1993 and was bishop of the Huelva Diocese from 1993 to 2006.
