= Diocese of Huelva =

Roman Catholic diocese in Spain

Coordinates: 37.2500°N 6.9500°E

Diocese of Huelva Dioecesis Onubensis Diócesis de Huelva

Catholic
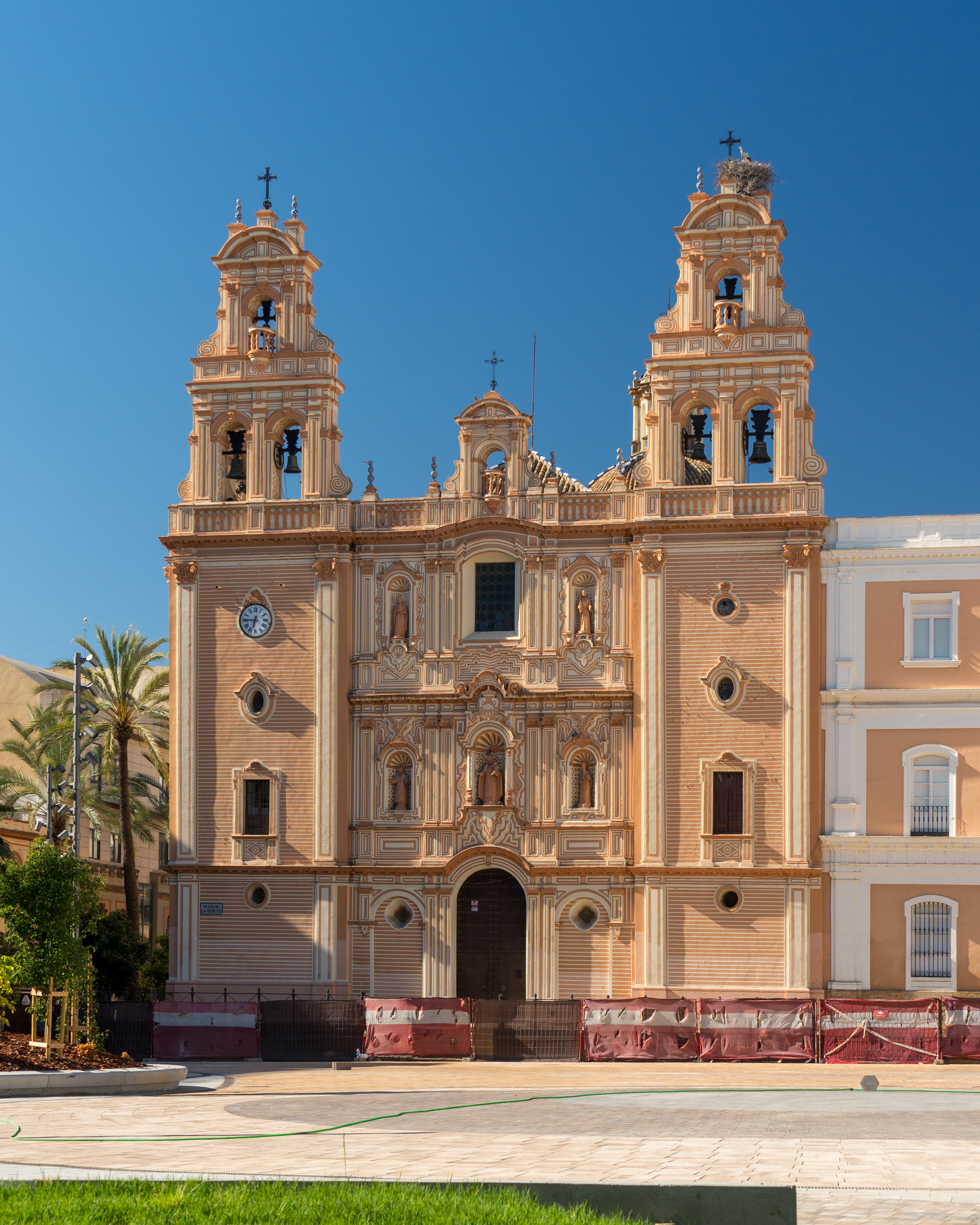
- Huelva Cathedral

Location
- Country: Spain
- Ecclesiastical province: Seville
- Metropolitan: Seville

Statistics
- Area: 10,085 km^{2} (3,894 sq mi)
- Population: Total; Catholics: (as of 2006); 483,792; 464,440 (96%)

Information
- Denomination: Catholic
- Sui iuris church: Latin Church
- Rite: Roman Rite
- Established: 22 October 1953
- Cathedral: Cathedral of Our Lady of Mercy in Huelva

Current leadership
- Pope: Leo XIV
- Bishop: Santiago Gómez Sierra
- Metropolitan Archbishop: José Ángel Saiz Meneses
- Bishops emeritus: José Vilaplana Blasco

Website
- diocesisdehuelva.es

The Diocese of Huelva (Latin: Dioecesis Onubensis) is a Latin Church diocese of the Catholic Church located in south-western Spain, and its borders coincide with those of the civil province of Huelva, part of the autonomous community of Andalusia. The diocese forms part of the Ecclesiastical Province of Seville, and is thus suffragan to the Archdiocese of Seville.

== Territory ==
The diocese is bounded on the north by the Archdiocese of Mérida-Badajoz, on the east by the Archdiocese of Seville and Diocese of Cádiz, on the south by the Atlantic Ocean, and on the west by the Diocese of Faro, in the Portuguese Algarve, of which it is separated by the Guadiana river. The surface of the diocese is 10,085 km² and its population is 472,000 in 79 municipalities (2005). The estimated catholic population is 446,000. There are 172 parishes in the diocese.

The territory includes four different zones:

- The Northern Mountain range, a mountainous land, with an oceanic microclimate that gives rise to an abundant vegetation.
- The Andévalo and Minas, a central, barren zone, in which mining operations abound.
- The Condado, to the Southeast, with fertile and rich lands, apt for agriculture and wine production.
- The Coast, to the southwest, apt for agriculture and fishing.

The economy is based on agriculture, fishing and mining. In the Diocese are located several historic places where Christopher Columbus sailed out of on his first voyage in 1492.

== Diocesan see ==
The see of the diocese, and provincial capital is the city of Huelva (pop 150,000), located next to the estuary that is created by the confluence of the rivers Tinto and Odiel, opening itself to the Atlantic near the city.

== History ==
The Diocese was erected 22 October 1953, dismembered from the Archdiocese of Seville.

Huelva Cathedral, Catedral de Nuestra Señora de la Merced, has been restored several times. The first church, the Church of Nuestra Señora de la Merced was built in 1614 and was destroyed almost completely by an earthquake, in 1755. Restoration of the building was started in 1767, continued in 1775 and finished in 1877. The church was selected as the cathedral of the new Diocese, in 1954. In 1970 the Cathedral was declared a Historic and Artistic Monument.

== Bishops of Huelva ==
- Pedro Cantero Cuadrado † (23 October 1953 Appointed – 20 May 1964 Appointed, Archbishop of Zaragoza)
- José María García Lahiguera † (7 July 1964 Appointed – 1 July 1969 Appointed, Archbishop of Valencia)
- Rafael González Moralejo † (28 November 1969 Appointed – 27 October 1993 Retired)
- Ignacio Noguer Carmona † (27 October 1993 Succeeded – 17 July 2006 Retired)
- José Vilaplana Blasco (17 July 2006 Appointed (transferred from Diocese of Santander) – 15 June 2020 Retired)
- Santiago Gómez Sierra (15 June 2020 Appointed – Present)

== See also ==
- List of Catholic dioceses in Spain
