= Postliminium =

Principle of international law

The principle of postliminium, as a part of public international law, is a specific version of the maxim ex injuria jus non oritur, providing for the invalidity of all illegitimate acts that an occupant may have performed on a given territory after its recapture by the legitimate sovereign. Therefore, if the occupant has appropriated and sold public or private property that may not legitimately be appropriated by a military occupant, the original owner may reclaim that property without payment of compensation. It derives from the ius postliminii, of Roman law. The codification of large areas of international law have made postliminium to a great extent superfluous though. It may either be seen as a historical concept, or a term generally describing the consequences to legal acts of an occupant after the termination of occupation.
