= Julio Sacristán =

Spanish politician (1953–2025)

Julio Sacristán de Diego (11 October 1953 – 22 July 2025) was a Spanish politician who served as mayor of Culleredo for more than three decades.

== Life and career ==
Sacristán was born in Cogeces del Monte on 11 October 1953. He was a Professor at the former Cruceiro Baleares Labor University (1972–1985) and was active in the CCOO until 1981. He was president of the Burgo Cultural Society (1976–1983). He joined the PSOE in 1982 and during the 1983 municipal elections, he led the candidacy of the PSdeG for the mayoralty of Culleredo and was elected mayor with a majority.

Sacristán died in Culleredo on 22 July 2025, at the age of 71.
