= Juan Antonio Menéndez Fernández =

Spanish Roman Catholic bishop (1957–2019)

- Bishop of Astorga
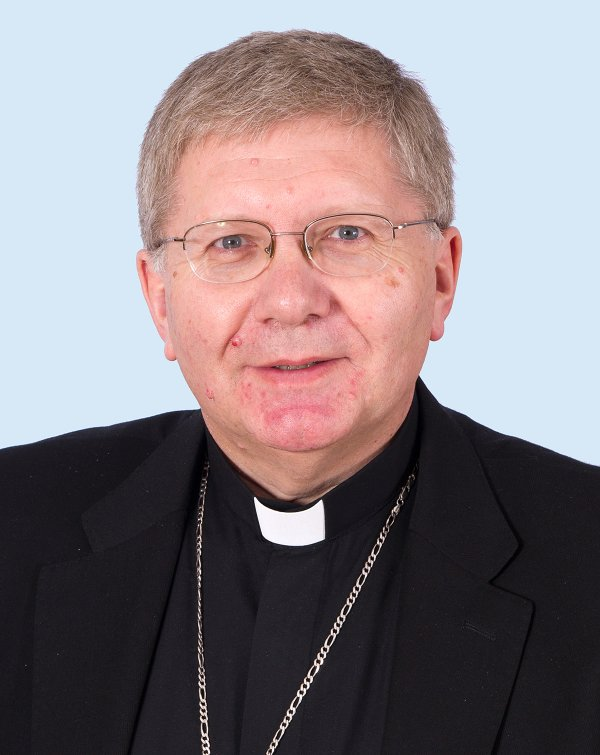
- Church: Catholic Church
- Diocese: Diocese of Astorga
- In office: 18 November 2015 – 15 May 2019
- Predecessor: Camilo Lorenzo Iglesias
- Successor: Jesús Fernández González
- Previous posts: Titular Bishop of Nasai (2013-2015); Auxiliary Bishop of Oviedo (2013-2015)

Orders
- Ordination: 10 May 1981
- Consecration: 8 June 2013 by Jesús Sanz Montes

Personal details
- Born: 6 January 1957 Villamarín, Province of Oviedo, Spanish State
- Died: 15 May 2019 (aged 62) Astorga, Castile and León, Spain

Juan Antonio Menéndez Fernández (6 January 1957 – 15 May 2019) was a Spanish Roman Catholic bishop.

Menéndez Fernández was born in Villamarín de Salcedo and was ordained to the priesthood in 1981. He served as an auxiliary bishop for the Roman Catholic Archdiocese of Oviedo, and titular bishop of Nasai from 2013 to 2015. He then served as bishop of the Roman Catholic Diocese of Astorga, from 2015 until his death in May 2019, due to a heart attack.
