= Diocese of Salamanca =

Roman Catholic diocese in Spain

Diocese of Salamanca Dioecesis Salmantina Diócesis de Salamanca

Catholic
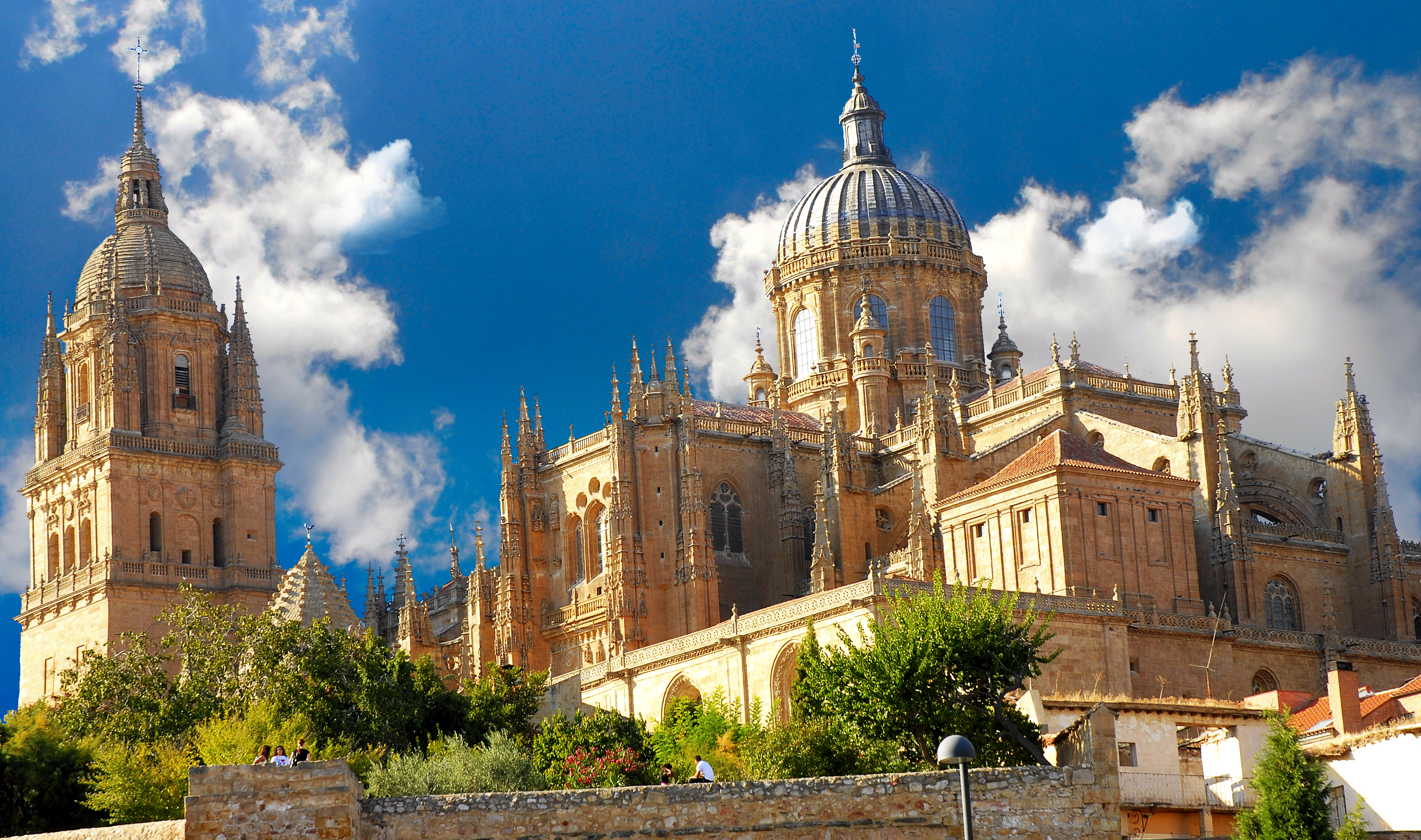
- New Cathedral, Salamanca

Location
- Country: Spain
- Ecclesiastical province: Valladolid
- Metropolitan: Valladolid

Statistics
- Area: 7,876 km^{2} (3,041 sq mi)
- Population: Total; Catholics: (as of 2010); 302,200; 296,000 (97.9%)

Information
- Rite: Latin Rite
- Cathedral: New Cathedral Basilica of Our Lady of the Siege in Salamanca
- Co-cathedral: Old Cathedral of Our Lady in Salamanca

Current leadership
- Pope: Leo XIV
- Bishop: José Luis Retana Gozalo
- Metropolitan Archbishop: Luis Javier Argüello García
- Bishops emeritus: Carlos López Hernández

Map
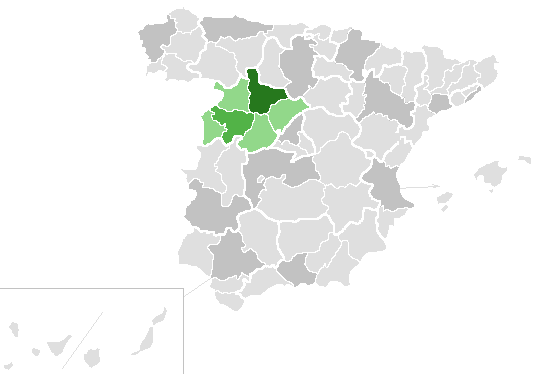

Website
- Website of the Diocese

The Diocese of Salamanca (Latin: Dioecesis Salmantina) is a Latin diocese of the Catholic Church located in the city of Salamanca in the ecclesiastical province of Valladolid in Spain.

== History ==
The See of Salamanca is of unknown origin. St. Secundus is said to have founded the Diocese of Avila. Signatures of bishops of Salamanca are found in the Councils of Toledo; in the third council is that of Eleutherius; at the coronation of King Gondemar, that of Teveristus; in the fourth and sixth of Hiccila; in the seventh, eighth and tenth, of Egeretus; in the Provincial Council of Mérida (metropolis of Salamanca) the signature of Justus;in the twelfth of Toledo that of Providentius; in the thirteenth, fifteenth, and sixteenth, of Holemund, probably contemporaneous with the Muslim invasion.

Alfonso I the Catholic pushed his conquests as far as Salamanca, and Ordoño I of Asturias captured the city, but its bishops continued to reside in Asturias, where the Church of San Julian, outside the walls of Oviedo, was assigned to them. Bishop Quindulfus (802) signed a royal deed of gift. Ramiro II of León, who defeated the Muslim forces at Simancas, began to repopulate Salamanca. In 1102 the king's son-in-law Raymond, Count of Burgundy, and his wife Urraca of Castile, gave the churches of the city to Don Jerónimo, the count's master, and built the Cathedral of S. Maria. The celebrated bishop, comrade of the Cid Campeador, died in 1120 and was interred in the newly built basilica, to which he left the "Christ of the Battles" (Cristo de las Batallas).

Later bishops were:

- Gerardo; Munio, a partisan of Alfonso of Aragon;
- Berengario, consecrated in 1135 and transferred to Santiago de Compostela in 1151;
- Navarro;
- Ordoño Gonzalo;
- Pedro Suárez de Deza, praised by Pope Alexander III for learning and prudence;
- Vitalis, who maintained the validity of Alfonso IX's marriage with his cousin Teresa of Portugal against the censures of Pope Celestine III and the sentence of the bishops presided over by Cardinal Guillermo in 1197.

From his period date the university of Salamanca and the most ancient and famous convents of Dominicans, Franciscans, and Clarisses. In October, 1310, the see being vacant, fifteen prelates of the ancient Province of Lusitania, presided over by the Archbishop of Santiago, assembled in the cathedral of Salamanca to try the case of the Knights Templar, and found them innocent in Spain of all the atrocities with which they were charged.

Bishop Juan Lucero accompanied King Alfonso XI to the conquest of Algeciras. Later on he became subservient to the caprices of Pedro I the Cruel and annulled (1354) his marriage with Blanche of Bourbon in order to unite him with Juana de Castro. Lucero's successor, Alsonso Barrasa, on the contrary, supported Henry of Trastamare against Pedro. In May, 1382, a council was held at Salamanca to take action in the matter of the schism of Avignon, and Castile decided in favour of the antipope. In another council (1410) Salamanca again recognized Peter de Luna (Benedict XIII) as pope. At this time Vincent Ferrer laboured to convert the Jews of Salamanca; from 1460 to 1478 John of Sahagun preached in the diocese.

== Special churches ==
- Minor Basilicas:
  - Basílica de Santa Teresa, Alba de Tormes, Salamanca, Castilla y Leon

== List of bishops ==
=== Roman period ===
- Pius (c. 83)
- Cetulus (c. 203)
- Salutatus (c. 223)
- Peter I (c. 245)
- Peter II (c. 269)
- Germanus (c. 298)
- Savius (c. 305)
- John (c. 332)
- Juvencius (c. 337)

=== Visigothic period ===
- Eleutherius (fl. 589)
- Teveristus (fl. 610)
- Hiccila (fl. 633–638)
- Egeretus (fl. 646–656)
- Justus (fl. 666)
- Providentius (fl. 681)
- Holemund (fl. 683–693)

=== Astru-Leonese period ===
- Quindulf (c. 830)
- Duclidius I (c. 876)
- Sebastian I (c. 880)
- Fredesind (c. 898)
- Duclidius II (c. 921)
- Theodomund (c. 960)
- Salvatus (c. 973)
- Sebastian II (c. 987)
- Gonzalo I (c. 1022)

=== Leonese–Castilian period ===
- Jerome (1102–1120)
- Gerald (1121–1124)
- Munio (1124–1130)
- Alonso Pérez (1130–1131)
- Navarro (1133)
- Berengar (1135–1150), translated to Santiago de Compostela
- Íñigo Navarro (1152–1159)
- Ordoño González (1159–1164)
- Gonzalo II (1165–1166)
- Pedro Suárez de Deza (1166–1173), translated to Santiago de Compostela
- Vitalis (1173–1194)
- Gonzalo Fernández (1195–1226)
- Diego (1226)
- Pelagius or Peter (1227)
- Martín Fernández (1229–1245)
- Mateo de Reinal (1246–1247), translated to Cuenca
- Pedro Pérez (1247–1264)
- Domingo Martínez (1264–1267)
- Gonzalo Rodríguez (1273–1279)
- Nuño Fernández (1278), elected, never consecrated
- Pedro Suárez (1279–1286)
- Pedro Fechor (1286–1304)
- Alfonso (1306–1309)
- Peter V (1310–1324)
- Bernardo Juan de Compostela (1324–1327)
- Gonzalo González de Toledo (1327–1329)
- Alonso OO (1330)
- Lorenzo I (1330–1335)
- Lorenzo y Rodrigo Díaz (1335–1339)
- Juan Lucero (1339–1361), translated to Segovia
- Alfonso Barasaque (1361–1375), cardinal
- Alfonso II (1375–c. 1382)
- Juan de Castellanos (1382–c. 1387)
- Peter (VI) (1387–c. 1389)
- Carlos de Guevara (1389–1392)
- Diego de Anaya Maldonado (1392–1407), translated to Cuenca
- Alonso de Carrillo (apostolic administrator 1408), cardinal
- Gonzalo de Alba (1408–1412)
- Alfonso de Cusanza (1412–1422)
- Sancho López de Castilla (1423–1446)
- Alfonso V (1446)
- Gonzalo Pérez de Vivero (1447–1482)
- Raffaele Sansone Riario (apostolic administrator 8 Jul 1482 – 15 Jan 1483), cardinal
- Diego Meléndez de Valdés (1483–1491), elect, never consecrated
- Hernando de Talavera (apostolic administrator 1483–1485), named bishop of Ávila
- Pedro Díaz de Toledo (apostolic administrator 1485–1491)

=== Modern period ===
- Oliviero Carafa (16 Nov 1491 – 23 Jun 1494 Resigned)
- Diego de Deza, OP (23 Jun 1494 – 14 Feb 1498 Appointed, Bishop of Jaén)
- Juan de Castilla (1498 – 1510 Died)
- Francisco Bobadilla (18 Nov 1510 – 29 Aug 1529 Died)
- Luis Cabeza de Vaca (22 Jun 1530 – 14 Apr 1537 Appointed, Bishop of Palencia)
- Rodrigo Mendoza Manrique (11 Jul 1537 Appointed – 4 Nov 1545 Died)
- Pedro Castro Lemos (20 Feb 1545 – 5 Jun 1555 Appointed, Bishop of Cuenca)
- Pedro Acuña Avellaneda (5 Jun 1555 – 24 Sep 1555 Died)
- Francisco Manrique de Lara (24 Apr 1556 – 26 Jun 1560 Appointed, Bishop of Sigüenza)
- Pedro González Mendoza (26 Jun 1560 – 10 Sep 1574 Died)
- Francisco Soto Salazar (15 Feb 1576 – 21 Jan 1578 Died)
- Fernando Tricio Arenzana (13 Jun 1578 – 9 Oct 1578 Died)
- Jerónimo Manrique de Lara (bishop of Salamanca) (9 Jan 1579 – 19 Sep 1593 Died)
- Pedro Junco Posada (3 Apr 1598 – 3 May 1602 Died)
- Luis Fernández de Córdoba (20 Nov 1602 – 9 Feb 1615 Appointed, Bishop of Málaga)
- Diego Ordonez, OFM (6 Jul 1615 – 22 Dec 1615 Died)
- Francisco Hurtado de Mendoza y Ribera (5 Sep 1616 – 17 Mar 1621 Appointed, Bishop of Pamplona)
- Antonio Corrionero (17 May 1621 – 4 Apr 1633 Died)
- Cristóbal de la Cámara y Murga (7 May 1635 – 29 Apr 1641 Died)
- Juan Valenzuela Velázquez (24 Mar 1642 – 2 Feb 1645 Died)
- Juan Ortiz de Zárate (bishop) (21 Aug 1645 – 24 Apr 1646 Died)
- Francisco Diego Alarcón y Covarrubias (18 Oct 1645 – 6 Jul 1648 Confirmed, Bishop of Pamplona)
- Pedro Carrillo Acuña y Bureba (27 Jul 1648 – 30 Aug 1655 Appointed, Archbishop of Santiago de Compostela)
- Juan Pérez Delgado (11 Oct 1655 – 15 Jan 1657 Appointed, Archbishop of Burgos)
- Antonio Peña Hermosa (18 Jun 1657 – 31 Mar 1659 Confirmed, Bishop of Málaga)
- Francisco Antonio Díaz de Cabrera (5 Apr 1660 – 22 Aug 1661 Died)
- Gabriel de Esparza Pérez (13 Mar 1662 – 2 Jun 1670 Appointed, Bishop of Calahorra y La Calzada)
- Francisco de Seijas Losada (20 Jun 1670 – 28 Apr 1681 Appointed, Archbishop of Santiago de Compostela)
- Pedro de Salazar Gutiérrez de Toledo, OdeM (2 Jun 1681 – 16 Sep 1686 Appointed, Bishop of Córdoba)
- José Cosío Barreda (3 Mar 1687 – 13 Apr 1689 Died)
- Martín Ascargorta (7 Nov 1689 – 18 May 1693 Appointed, Archbishop of Granada)
- Francisco Calderón de la Barca Nieto (20 Jul 1693 – 25 Feb 1712 Died)
- Silvestre García Escalona (13 Jun 1714 – 20 Apr 1729 Died)
- José Sancho Granado (23 Dec 1729 – 30 Sep 1748 Died)
- José Zorrilla de Sanmartín (20 Jan 1749 – 30 Sep 1762 Died)
- Felipe Beltrán Serrano (18 Jul 1763 – 30 Nov 1783 Died)
- Andrés José Barco Espinosa (27 Jun 1785 A – 17 Apr 1794 Died)
- Felipe Antonio Fernández Vallejo (12 Sep 1794 – 18 Dec 1797 Appointed, Archbishop of Santiago de Compostela)
- Antonio Tavira Almazán (14 Aug 1798 – 8 Jan 1807 Died)
- Gerardo José Andrés Vázquez Parga, OCist (3 Aug 1807 – 16 Sep 1821 Died)
- Agustín Lorenzo Varela Temes (12 Jul 1824 – 21 Mar 1849 Died)
- Salvador Sanz Grado (7 Jan 1850 – 21 Jan 1851 Died)
- Antolín García Lozano (5 Sep 1851 – 15 May 1852 Died)
- Fernando de la Puente y Primo de Rivera (27 Sep 1852 – 25 Sep 1857 Confirmed, Archbishop of Burgos)
- Anastasio Rodrigo Yusto (25 Sep 1857 – 20 Sep 1867 Confirmed, Archbishop of Burgos)
- Joaquín Lluch y Garriga, OCD (13 Mar 1868 – 16 Jan 1874 Appointed, Bishop of Barcelona)
- Narciso Martínez Izquierdo (16 Jan 1874 – 27 Mar 1885 Appointed, Bishop of Madrid)
- Tomás Jenaro de Cámara y Castro, OSA (27 Mar 1885 – 17 May 1904 Died)
- Francisco Javier Valdés y Noriega, OSA (14 Nov 1904 – 22 Jan 1913 Died)
- Julián de Diego y García Alcolea (18 Jul 1913 – 27 Jul 1923 Appointed, Patriarch of the West Indies)
- Ángel Regueras y López (26 Oct 1923 – 28 Dec 1924 Died)
- Francisco Frutos y Valiente (14 Dec 1925 – 24 Jan 1933 Died)
- Enrique Pla y Deniel (28 Jan 1935 – 31 Oct 1941 Appointed, Archbishop of Toledo)
- Francisco Barbado y Viejo, OP (10 Apr 1942 – 29 Apr 1964 Died)
- Mauro Rubio Repullés (7 Jul 1964 – 12 May 1995 Retired)
- Braulio Rodríguez Plaza (12 May 1995 – 28 Aug 2002 Appointed, Archbishop of Valladolid)
- Carlos López Hernández (9 Jan 2003 – 15 Nov 2021 Retired)
- José Luis Retana Gozalo (15 Nov 2021 – present)

== See also ==
- Roman Catholicism in Spain
- Roman Catholic Diocese of León in Spain
- Roman Catholic Diocese of Astorga
- Roman Catholic Diocese of Zamora in Spain
- Kingdom of León
- Leonese language
