= Francisco Mendoza (bishop of Palencia) =

Spanish Catholic prelate (??–1536)

Most Reverend Francisco Mendoza
- Bishop of Palencia
- Church: Catholic Church
- Diocese: Diocese of Palencia
- In office: 1534–1536
- Predecessor: Pedro Gómez Sarmiento de Villandrando
- Successor: Luis Cabeza de Vaca
- Previous posts: Bishop of Oviedo (1525–1527); Bishop of Zamora (1527–1534)

Personal details
- Died: 29 March 1536 Palencia, Spain

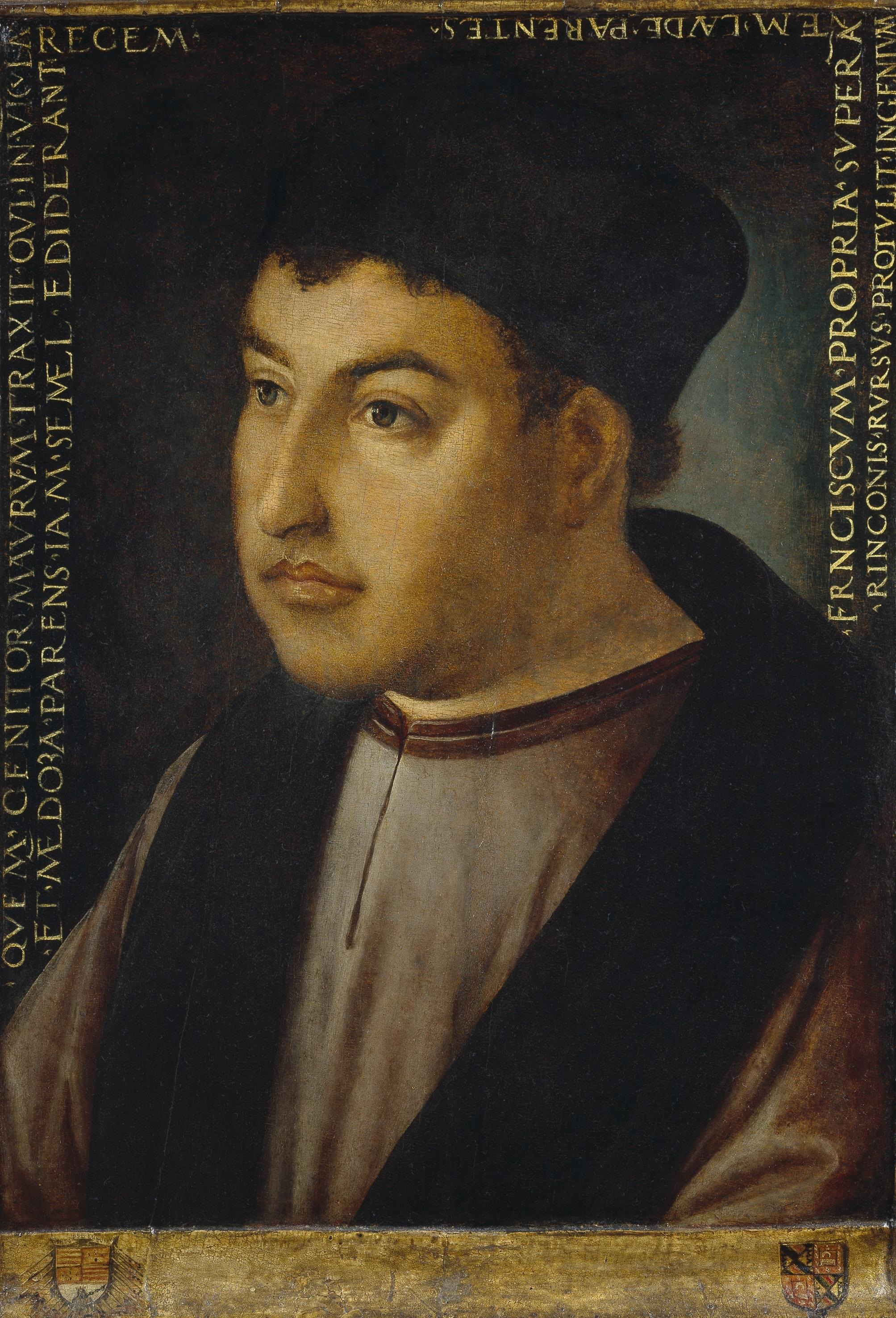
Portrait of Francisco Mendoza

Francisco Mendoza (died 29 March 1536) was a Roman Catholic prelate who served as Bishop of Palencia (1534–1536), Bishop of Zamora (1527–1534), and Bishop of Oviedo (1525–1527).

== Biography ==
On 6 November 1525, Francisco Mendoza was selected by the King of Spain and confirmed by Pope Clement VII as Bishop of Oviedo. On 3 April 1527, he was selected by the King of Spain and confirmed by Pope Clement VII as Bishop of Zamora. On 18 January 1534, he was selected by the King of Spain and confirmed by Pope Clement VII as Bishop of Palencia. He served as Bishop of Palencia until his death on 29 March 1536.

While bishop, he was the principal consecrator of Fernando Valdés, Bishop of Elne (1529) and Rodrigo de Bastidas y Rodriguez de Romera, Bishop of Coro (1532); and was the principal co-consecrator of Tomás de Berlanga, Bishop of Panamá (1534).

== External links and additional sources ==
- Cheney, David M. "Metropolitan Archdiocese of Oviedo". Catholic-Hierarchy.org. (for Chronology of Bishops) ^{[self-published]}
- Chow, Gabriel. "Archdiocese of Oviedo (Spain)". GCatholic.org. (for Chronology of Bishops) ^{[self-published]}
- Cheney, David M. "Diocese of Zamora". Catholic-Hierarchy.org. (for Chronology of Bishops) ^{[self-published]}
- Chow, Gabriel. "Diocese of Zamora (Spain)". GCatholic.org. (for Chronology of Bishops) ^{[self-published]}
- Cheney, David M. "Diocese of Palencia". Catholic-Hierarchy.org. (for Chronology of Bishops) ^{[self-published]}
- Chow, Gabriel. "Diocese of Palencia (Spain)". GCatholic.org. (for Chronology of Bishops) ^{[self-published]}

Catholic Church titles
Preceded by Diego de Muros	Bishop of Oviedo; 1525–1527	Succeeded by Diego Acuña
Preceded by Antonio Acuña	Bishop of Zamora; 1527–1534	Succeeded by Pedro Manuel
Preceded by Pedro Gómez Sarmiento de Villandrando	Diocese of Palencia; 1534–1536	Succeeded by Luis Cabeza de Vaca
