= Diego Salcedo =

Diego Salcedo may refer to:

- Diego Salcedo (soldier) (died 1511), Spanish conquistador
- Diego Salcedo (bishop) (1575–1644), Spanish bishop

== See also ==
- Diego de Salcedo, Spanish army officer and Governor-General of the Philippines, 1663–1668
