= Treaty of York (1464) =

1464 treaty between England and Scotland

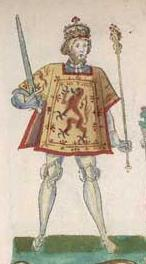
James III of Scotland was 12 years old when his diplomats concluded the Treaty of York

The Treaty of York (1464) was made between England (under Edward IV) and Scotland (under James III) on 1 June 1464 at York and was intended to establish 15 years of peace. Previously Scotland had supported the defeated House of Lancaster in the English civil War of the Roses.

== Background ==
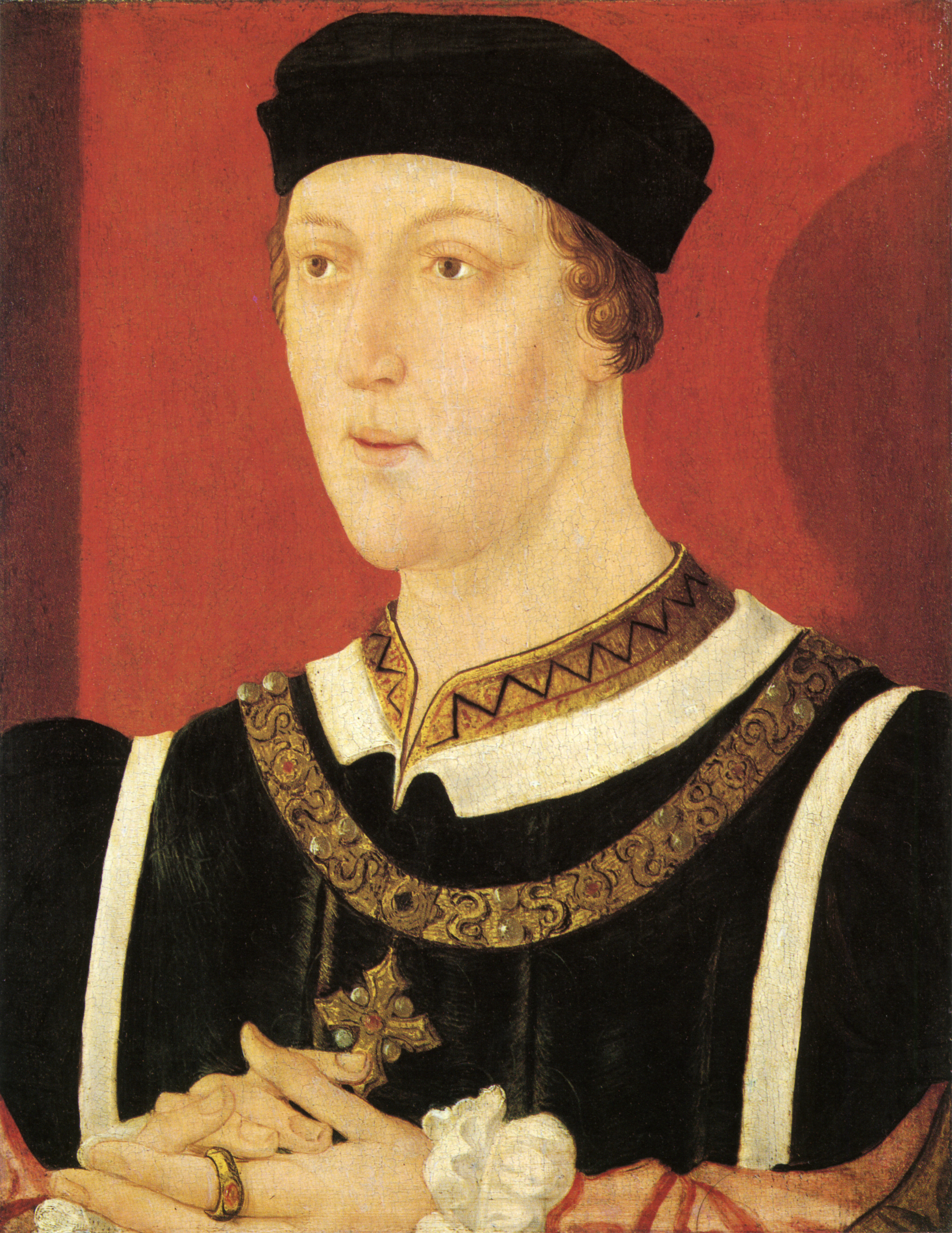
The exiled Lancastrian king Henry VI had found a refuge in Scotland

At the time of the negotiation Alexander Stewart, Duke of Albany and Bishop Spens were prisoners in England. Scottish foreign policy was dominated by Bishop James Kennedy after the death of Mary of Gueldres in December 1463. As practical support from Louis XI of France was unlikely Scotland was forced to abandon its alliance with the House of Lancaster and treat with the Yorkist Edward IV of England.

Previously, the Lancastrian Henry VI of England, his wife Margaret of Anjou and son Prince Edward had found refuge in Scotland after the battle of Towton in 1461. Margaret had promised to deliver Berwick upon Tweed and Carlisle to Scotland, but these plans came to nothing permanent beyond the temporary handover of Berwick for twenty years, with a failed joint Scottish and Lancastrian siege of Carlisle and a successful expedition to relieve the Lancastrian garrison at Alnwick Castle in January 1463.

An invasion at Norham Castle in July 1463 was a failure swiftly followed by devastation in the Scottish Borders by the Richard Neville, Earl of Warwick and the Yorkist-supporting Earl of Douglas. Douglas had cemented his alliance by the Treaty of Westminster. Margaret and Prince Edward left Scotland for Burgundy after the defeat at Norham. Henry VI eventually made his way to England and was captured in Lancashire in July 1465.

== Performance ==
Bishop Kennedy did not attend the negotiations. The Scottish commissioners were Andrew, Bishop of Glasgow; Archibald, Abbot of Holyrood; James Lindsay, Prior of Lincluden, Keeper of the Privy Seal; Colin Campbell, Earl of Argyll; William, Lord Borthwick; Robert, Lord Boyd; and Alexander Boyd of Drumcol.

Edward IV's commissioners were Chancellor George, Bishop of Exeter; Richard, Earl of Warwick and Salisbury; John, Baron Montague; Ralph, Baron Greystoke; Robert, Baron Ogle; Dr James Goldwell, Dean of Salisbury; Sir James Strangeways and Sir Robert Constable, with Roger Thornton.

The treaty was completed at Newcastle upon Tyne in December 1465 with an increased 40-year truce to last till sundown on 31 October 1519. The extension was ratified by Edward IV on 1 January 1466.

The later Anglo-Scottish agreement of 1497 negotiated at Ayton Parish Church by the Spanish Ambassador Pedro de Ayala referred to trade arrangements made at York. The 1464 articles relating to sea affairs were much the same as those of the Treaty of Durham of 1449 except that in cases of shipwreck, the ship and the cargo would remain the property of any survivors. The English island of Lundy and the Scottish lands of Lorne were excluded from the treaty.

== Twenty years after ==
The treaty was broken by James III and Edward IV in 1480. In June 1480, Edward IV gave orders for a large army with artillery to be mustered in the East Riding of Yorkshire from the northern counties, to be led by Richard, Duke of Gloucester. In March 1481 Edward commissioned cannon and gunners for a naval expedition against Scotland of eleven warships under the command of Richard Simmons, Master of the Grace Dieu, and in June renewed his league with the John, Lord of the Isles and Donald Gorve (Gorm). On 11 June 1482, at Fotheringhay Castle, the younger brother of James III, Alexander Stewart, Duke of Albany, declared himself King of Scotland, and promised by treaty to deliver Berwick and other places to Edward and break the Auld Alliance with France. Berwick town surrendered to Edward's army in July 1482 and the castle submitted in August.
