= Luis García Rodríguez =

Roman Catholic prelate (died 1638)

Most Reverend Luis García Rodríguez
- Bishop of Astorga
- Church: Catholic Church
- Diocese: Diocese of Astorga
- In office: 1637–1638
- Predecessor: Alfonso Mesía de Tovar
- Successor: Diego Salcedo Benacos

Orders
- Ordination: 18 September 1604
- Consecration: 21 September 1634 by Francisco Sánchez Villanueva y Vega

Personal details
- Died: 18 April 1638 Astorga, Spain

Luis García Rodríguez (died 1638) was a Roman Catholic prelate who served as Bishop of Astorga (1637–1638) and Bishop of Orense (1634–1637).

== Biography ==
Luis García Rodríguez was ordained a priest on 18 September 1604. On 23 January 1634, he was appointed during the papacy of Pope Urban VIII as Bishop of Orense. On 21 September 1634, he was consecrated bishop by Francisco Sánchez Villanueva y Vega, Bishop of Mazara del Vallo, with Miguel Avellán, Titular Bishop of Siriensis, and Juan Bravo Lagunas, Bishop Emeritus of Ugento, serving as co-consecrators. On 9 February 1637, he was appointed during the papacy of Pope Urban VIII as Bishop of Astorga. He served as Bishop of Astorga until his death on 18 April 1638.

== External links and additional sources ==
- Cheney, David M. "Diocese of Orense". Catholic-Hierarchy.org. (for Chronology of Bishops) ^{[self-published]}
- Chow, Gabriel. "Diocese of Orense (Spain)". GCatholic.org. (for Chronology of Bishops) ^{[self-published]}
- Cheney, David M. "Diocese of Astorga". Catholic-Hierarchy.org. (for Chronology of Bishops) ^{[self-published]}
- Chow, Gabriel. "Diocese of Astorga (Spain)". GCatholic.org. (for Chronology of Bishops) ^{[self-published]}

Catholic Church titles
Preceded by Diego Zúñiga Sotomayor	Bishop of Orense; 1634–1637	Succeeded by Juan Velasco Acevedo
Preceded by Alfonso Mesía de Tovar	Bishop of Astorga; 1637–1638	Succeeded by Diego Salcedo Benacos
