= Pedro de Ayala =

Spanish diplomat

Most Reverend Pedro López Ayala
- Bishop of Islas Canarias
- Church: Catholic Church
- Diocese: Diocese of Islas Canarias
- In office: 1507–1513
- Predecessor: Diego de Muros
- Successor: Fernando Vázquez de Arce

Personal details
- Died: 31 January 1513 Canary Islands, Spain

Don Pedro de Ayala also Pedro López Ayala (died 31 January 1513) was a 16th-century Spanish diplomat employed by Ferdinand II of Aragon and Isabella I of Castile at the courts of James IV of Scotland and Henry VII of England. His mission to Scotland was concerned with the King's marriage and the international crisis caused by the pretender Perkin Warbeck. In his later career he supported Catherine of Aragon in England but was involved in a decade of rivalry with the resident Spanish ambassador in London. Ayala was a Papal prothonotary, Archdeacon of London, and Bishop of the Canary Islands.

Sources in English reveal little of Ayala's background; however, he was from the noble family of the Counts of Fuensalida in Toledo. He was the son of Pedro Lopez de Ayala, Commendator of Mora and Treze, and Doña Leonor de Ayala. His contemporary, the historian Polydore Vergil, who may have known him in England, remarks that he was clever, but no scholar.

== Mission to Portugal ==
In November 1493, Don Pedro de Ayala and Don Garcí Lopez de Carbajal were sent in embassy to King John II of Portugal. Their mission concerned the line of demarcation between Spanish and Portuguese maritime exploration. The issue now particularly concerned Ferdinand and Isabella as sponsors of Christopher Columbus, and the Spanish ambassadors offered to put the matter in the Pope's hands as arbitrator.

King John II was displeased by the embassy and the news of Columbus's latest voyage. He is said to have shown the Spanish ambassadors the strength of his cavalry, as if to intimidate them, and later mocked Don Pedro for his limp, and Don Garcia for his frivolous character. A second negotiation by Portuguese commissioners in Spain in March 1494 was more successful and brought about a new settlement for the rivalry in exploration with the Treaty of Tordesillas.

== Mission to Scotland ==
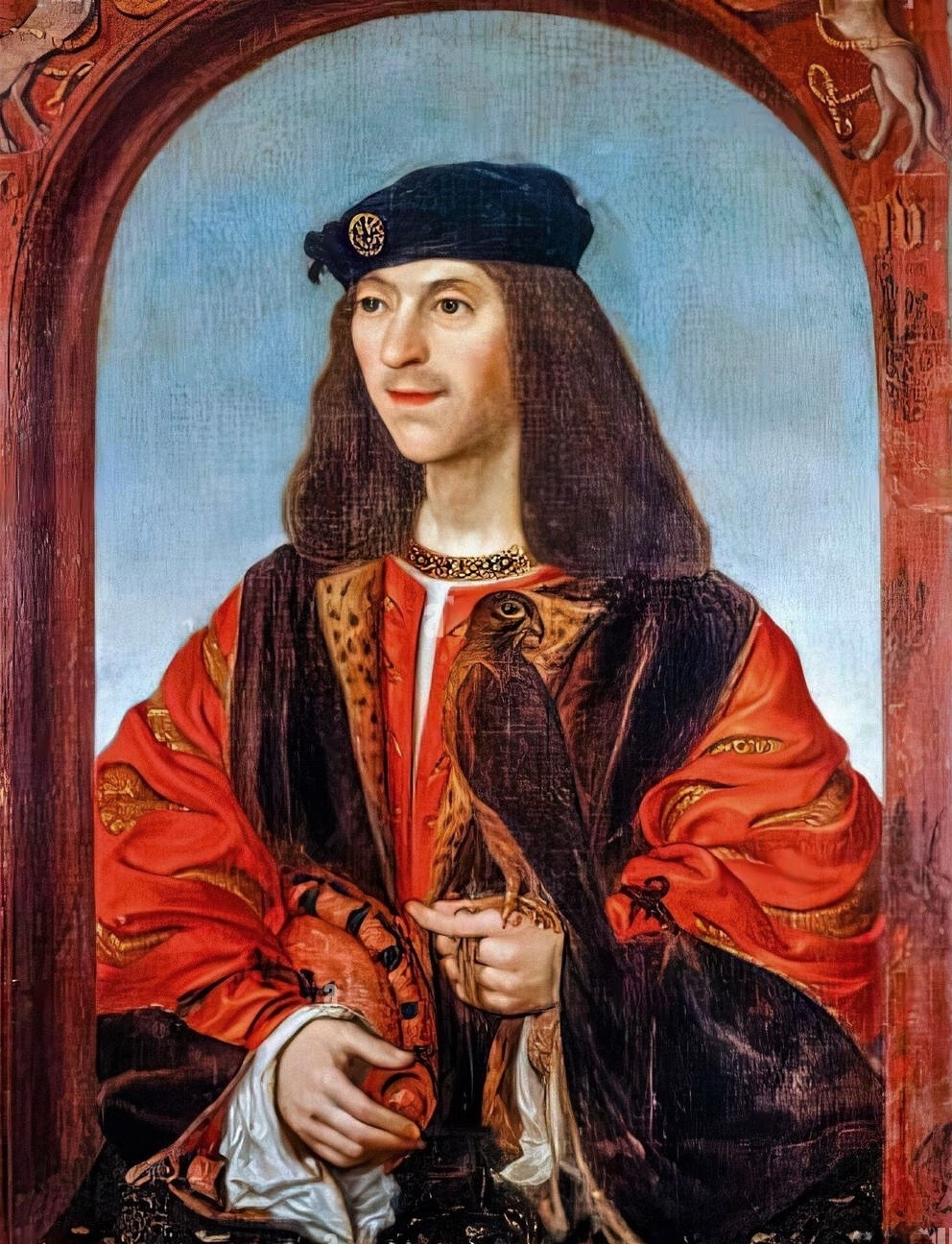
James IV of Scotland counted Pedro de Ayala as a friend

=== Spanish diplomacy before Don Pedro ===
Before Pedro de Ayala arrived in Scotland, James IV had received several brief Spanish embassies. In 1489, Don Martin de Torre got a formal reception at Linlithgow Palace, including a play performed by Patrick Johnson's fellows. Martin's servants presented a sword and a dagger to James and he gave them gloves containing gold coins. Martin then departed to England with the Scottish Snawdoun Herald. He returned two years later in July 1491 bringing a troupe of Spanish dancers who performed on Edinburgh's Royal Mile outside the Lord Treasurer's house. Once again, Martin came to Scotland with a colleague Garcia de Herrara in September 1495. Unfortunately, their confidential instructions concerning Ferdinand and Isabella's lukewarm position on a Spanish marriage for James IV arrived first, and James read them. Despite this poor start, they stayed through the winter, and attended Perkin Warbeck's wedding to Lady Catherine Gordon. The Spanish ambassadors obtained a Latin copy of a love letter believed to be Perkin Warbeck's proposal to Lady Catherine Gordon.

James sent Don Martin and Garcia back to Spain with two Scottish ambassadors, two fine hackney horses, five large swift dogs for hunting wild boar, and a goshawk said to be able to catch cranes and buzzards. There was already a veteran ambassador in London, Dr Rodrigo Gonzalez (or Gundisalvi) de Puebla, who had worked on the Treaty of Woking in 1490. This alliance between Spain and England was a ratification of the Treaty of Medina del Campo, to be sealed by the marriage of Catherine of Aragon to Arthur, Prince of Wales.

=== The Spanish resident ===
This pattern of brief visits changed in June or July 1496, when James IV was flattered to entertain Don Pedro de Ayala as a resident Spanish ambassador at his court, and he paid some of Ayala's expenses. James reserved a house in Edinburgh for the Spanish embassy, paying £40 for a year's rent and damages. The house stood at the head of Niddry's Wynd on the south side of the Royal Mile, known as 'the late Walter Bertrame's House,' now the site of South Bridge.

Spain only had permanent resident ambassadors at Rome, Venice, in London, with Maximilian, and now in Scotland. Ayala's Scottish mission involved a diplomatic deception, as he was instructed to maintain the possibility that James might marry Catherine of Aragon, whilst knowing that she was more securely promised to Arthur, Prince of Wales. Isabella had told her ambassador in London, Dr Puebla, that Ayala's job would be to keep James IV in suspense. Primarily, his mission was to neutralise the threat to Spanish international goals posed by the pretender Perkin Warbeck, who claimed to be an English royal, the Duke of York, and seemed likely to draw Scotland into war with England. This was prejudicial to Spain's alliance with England by the Treaty of Woking, especially when talks for a marriage between Catherine of Aragon and Prince Arthur were close to conclusion. Because of the Auld Alliance between France and Scotland, a Scottish invasion might lead to England at war with France. Henry VII's response was to join the Holy League in October 1496. James IV and Scotland became centre stage, and even an unfortunate gesture he made in the garden of Stirling Castle or Holyroodhouse in front of Don Martin and De Herrara was reported and significant to Ferdinand and Isabella.

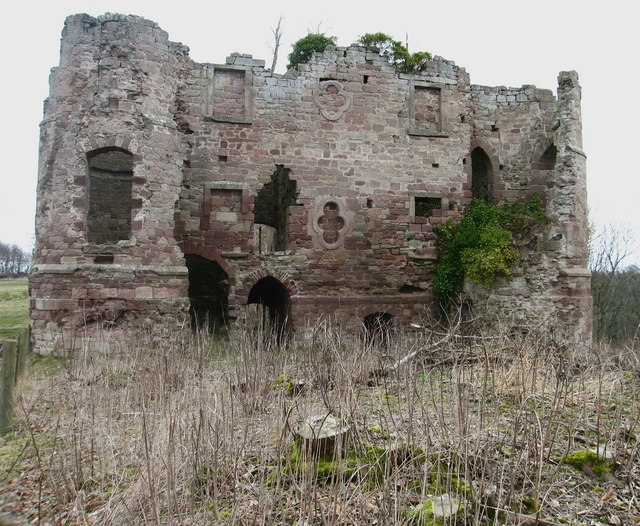
Twizell Castle on the River Till was destroyed by the Scots in 1496, the ruins were partially reconstructed in the 18th-century

Don Pedro de Ayala employed his diplomatic skill to ingratiate himself with James IV and undermine Perkin Warbeck. While James was unlikely to be seduced by the remote prospect of a Spanish marriage, or uncertain of Perkin's true identity, modern historians such as David Dunlop debate whether he fully realised Perkin Warbeck as an asset in Anglo-Scottish diplomacy.

=== Invading Northumbria ===
Twice Ayala went to the English border with the Scottish army, and crossed the Tweed into Northumbria with Warbeck on 21 September 1496 at Coldstream. Four of his Spanish servants were killed and three were injured in the fighting. James IV stayed a few days at Ellemford, and the invasion is known as the "Raid of Ellem". Miners were set to work to demolish Heaton Castle on 24 September. According to an English record, the Scots penetrated four miles into England with royal banner displayed, and destroyed 3 or 4 little towers or Bastle houses. They left on 25 September 1496 when an English army commanded by Lord Neville approached from Newcastle. The Tweed fishermen with their coble boats helped bring the artillery back over the Tweed. Ayala and Perkin Warbeck headed back to Edinburgh on 21 September.

Somehow, Ferdinand and Isabella were later led to believe that Ayala was absent from Scotland during Perkin and James IV's invasion of Northumbria, and regretted that he had not been present to prevent it. When news of Perkin and James IV's invasion of September 1496 reached Milan, Ludovico Sforza, Duke of Milan, wrote to his ambassador in Spain on 21 October 1497, to request the Spanish monarchs make peace between England and Scotland.

=== Ayala and Richard Foxe negotiate at Jenyn Haugh ===
By 28 March 1497, Ferdinand and Isabella were convinced that Perkin Warbeck's significance was waning and war between England and Scotland must be avoided. Dr Puebla, in London, was instructed to placate Henry VII who had heard that Ayala was credulous in believing the Scottish account of the situation. The chronicler George Buchanan mentions Ayala's negotiation at Jedburgh with Richard Foxe, Bishop of Durham and keeper of Norham Castle representing Henry VII. John Lesley says this first discussion with Foxe was held at Melrose Abbey. A second instruction to Foxe mentions his previous meeting at "Jenyn Haugh". James IV still refused to hand Perkin, his guest, to the English.

Henry VII considered the offers made at Jenyn Haugh by the Earl of Angus and Lord Home as inadequate and asked the Bishop of Durham to press James IV to surrender Perkin before any further negotiations for peace commenced. John Lesley, writing in the 1570s, gave a useful summary of Ayala's activity and Spanish intent to this point, quoted as his 16th-century translator put it;

"Quhen Ferdinand king of Hispane harde of sik trubles betwene thir twa kingis, quhom he lovet sa weil, he labouris quhat he can to sett thame at ane, and mak thame gude freindis. Quhairfor he directes to Scotland an ambassadour Petre Hiela, a singular man in pietie, cunning, prudent and wise, to persuade the Scotis king to peace and concord be al meines possible, quhen partelie the Scotis king was inclynet, and Ferdinand had a gude hope of his good wil, in al haist he sendes to king Henrie of Ingland, that he schortlie send an ambassadour to Scotland, for the conclusioun of the peace".

When Ferdinand, King of Spain, heard of such troubles between these two kings, whom he loved so well, he worked to do what he could to set them at one together, and make them good friends. Therefore he sent to Scotland an ambassador Pedro de Ayala, a notably pious man, cunning, prudent and wise, to persuade the Scottish king to peace and concord by all means possible, when in some part the Scottish king was well-inclined, and Ferdinand had good hope of his good will, Ferdinand wrote to Henry VII of England that he was shortly (soon) sending an ambassador to Scotland, for the conclusion of the peace.

Soon after this meeting, James relented, and Perkin Warbeck finally left Scotland around 7 July, and it may be a measure of Ayala's success that Perkin sailed under-equipped in a recently impounded French ship called the Cuckoo, captained by a reluctant hired Breton called Guy Foulcart.

=== The Sieges of Norham and Ayton Castles ===
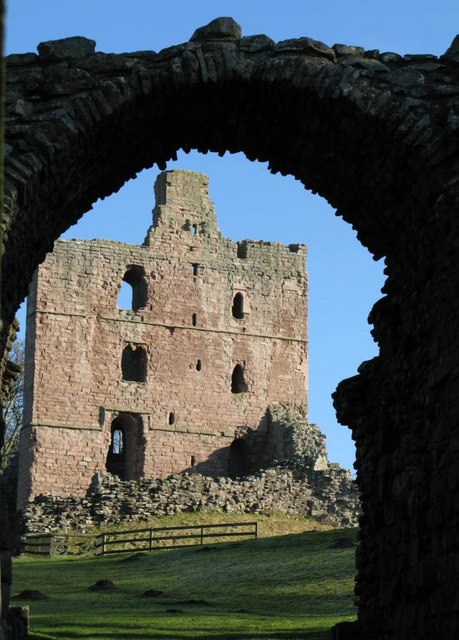
Norham Castle; Pedro de Ayala was present at the siege in August 1497, after holding talks with the keeper Richard Foxe in July

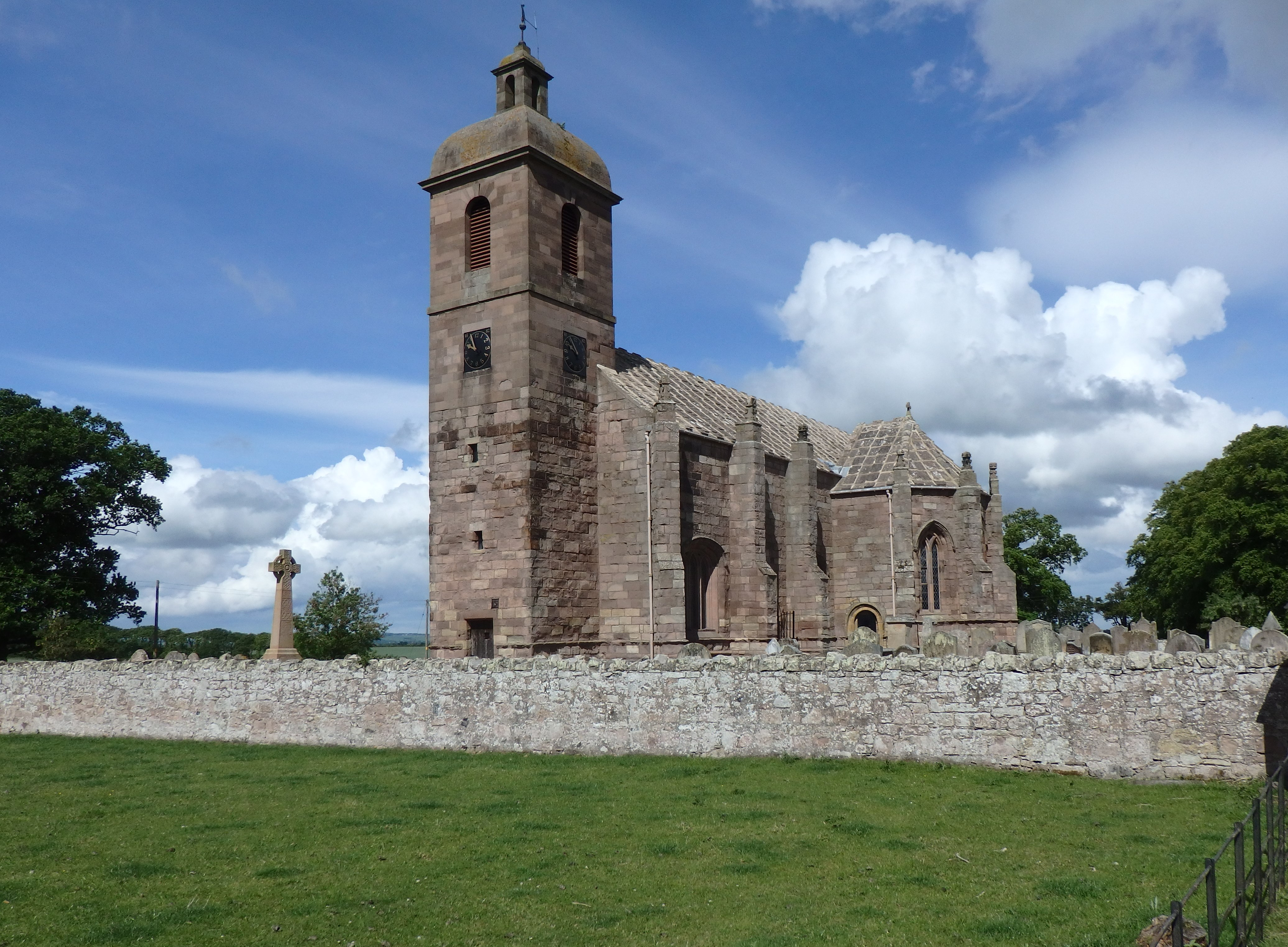
James IV built a new church at Upsettlington, perhaps in commemoration of the peace treaty

Now when all seemed settled, doubtless to Ayala's embarrassment, James IV ordered his artillery to be taken to the Scottish border. The guns included Mons Meg and Bishop Foxe's Norham Castle was the objective. According to George Buchanan this followed the new provocation of a border incident. Instead of sending men to join the host, the town of Dundee opted to contribute 450 gold crowns to the cost of hauling the guns to the border. The King played cards with Ayala at the siege on 7 August 1497. In this game, probably played at Upsettlington, the King lost 20 gold unicorns worth £18.

James IV, perhaps close to exhausting his resources, abandoned the siege at Norham and returned to Edinburgh by 12 August. Then an English army led by the Earl of Surrey arrived on the border and took Ayton Castle near to Berwick upon Tweed. The historian Norman MacDougall suggests that after a stand-off of a few days, James IV made a truce during an interview with Sir William Tyler, Governor of Berwick, at Dunbar Castle on 20 August 1497. The next day Surrey's army began to withdraw, and James sent letters around Scotland cancelling his requests for military support. The King played cards with Alaya again at Stirling Castle on 17 September 1497, and lost 21 unicorns and 15 ducats.

=== Treaty of Ayton (1497) ===
Don Pedro de Ayala helped negotiate the Treaty between England and Scotland signed at the church of Ayton on 30 September 1497, acting as the commissioner of the Scottish King. The commissioners for England were William Warham, Richard Foxe and John Cartington. Another englishmen present were Thomas Howard, Earl of Surrey (later 2nd duke of Norfolk) and his two eldest sons, whom he knighted at Ayton castle on the same day.

The other Scottish commissioners were Bishop Elphinstone, Andrew Forman, Patrick Hume of Fast Castle, and Richard Lawson. A seven-year truce between England and Scotland was agreed, from sunrise that day till sunset on 30 September 1504. Shipping and trade were to be conducted according to the previous Treaty of York. Border wardens on either side were given new powers, especially regarding the execution of cross-border murderers after 20 days detention, and capital punishment for thieves caught red-handed. Criminals seeking cross-border asylum would be returned or banished after 20 days. Neither King should harbour the other's rebels. Berwick, a disputed border town, was specifically included in the abstinence from war. Neither King was to demolish or restore the fishgarth, a salmon trap at Kirkandrews on Esk.

James gave Ayala authority to negotiate extensions and revisions. In its final form, the Spanish monarchs Ferdinand and Isabella were appointed to arbitrate future disputes and unresolved issues such as redress for damages caused by the recent invasions. On either side a number of men were appointed as Conservators of the truce with powers to oversee border justice to maintain the Treaty. James IV signed a ratification of the treaty at St Andrews on 10 February 1498. On 13 December 1497, Henry VII signed an agreement confirming the role of the Spanish monarchs as arbitrators. In March 1498, Ayala negotiated an extension of the treaty of Ayton, acting as the commissioner of James IV in further discussions with William Warham.

=== Spanish Ambassador to Scotland at London ===
In October 1497 James IV sent a yeoman of stable, John Terres, to the Spaniards with a gift of £66-13s-4d. Pedro de Ayala left for England at the end of October 1497 with Andrew Forman and a present of black cloth and velvet from the King. He was also given a sum of money by Sir Patrick Blackadder. In 1500, this Patrick Blackadder began the construction of the church, the Kirk o'Steill at Upsettlington opposite Norham. In London, Forman presented his credentials to Henry VII on 25 November 1497; Ayala, the other ambassadors, and the captured Perkin Warbeck were present. Forman showed the Milanese ambassador, Raimondo de' Raimondi de' Soncino, the Ayton articles which mentioned the truce was made by Spain's intervention.

Ayala may have returned to Scotland, the treasurer's accounts account record a game of tennis at Stirling between the "Prothonotar" and the king on 10 April 1498. When he was in England in May 1498, Ayala called himself the "Spanish ambassador to Scotland in London on business".

In London, Pedro de Ayala made links across the diplomatic community. Ayala kept in touch with Raimondo de' Raimondi by letter when he returned to Milan. Ayala advised Raimondo that diplomatic letters to James IV in Scotland from Milan should be copied to three other powerful Scots; the King's brother, James, Archbishop of St Andrews; Robert Blackadder the Archbishop of Glasgow; and Ayala's influential friend, the prothonotary, Andrew Forman. Don Pedro sent his letter from London on 6 May; it arrived, via Venice, in Milan on 15 June 1498.

Ayala advised Ferdinand and Isabella to send Catherine of Aragon to England as soon as possible to learn the language and English ways, and to reduce homesickness in later years..

Raimondo discovered within a week of his return to London in September 1498 that Don Pedro had no intention of returning to Scotland. Raimondo recorded that he went riding with Henry VII and Ayala on 28 January 1499. In March 1499, Ayala wrote to Raimondo's master, Ludovico Sforza, Duke of Milan, that he would further the Duke's interests in England without prejudice to Raimondo, and subsequently Ayala spoke to Henry to extend Raimondo's stay in London. James IV's confidence in Ayala remained so great that in 1500 he repeatedly asked him to return to Scotland to advise him on his proposed marriage to Margaret Tudor. Eventually, Ayala returned to Scottish affairs to assist in the conclusion of the Anglo-Scottish treaty made at Stirling Castle, on 20 July 1499, although he probably did not return to Scotland in person.

== Triumph and professional rivalry in 1498 ==
Despite the success of the treaty of Ayton, early in 1498, Henry VII was perturbed by Pedro de Ayala's actions in Scottish affairs, so Ferdinand and Isabella sent Fernán Pérez de Ayala to remedy the situation. Fernán was drowned before he reached England. But Ferdinand and Isabella were pleased to hear that the pretender to the English throne, Perkin Warbeck, who had been sponsored by James IV, was captured and Pedro de Ayala had managed to negotiate peace between Scotland and England. At the same time, Ayala's colleague, Dr Rodrigo Gonzalez de Puebla, resident ambassador in London, contracted the marriage between Catherine of Aragon and Prince Arthur. Dr Puebla, however, resented Ayala's presence in London and sought his recall. He wrote to Ferdinand and Isabella that Ayala showed no inclination to return to Scotland, and said he had to remind him of their diplomatic purpose;

""I declared, and often said to Don Pedro that the embassies which your Highnesses send to all parts of the world are not only for the purpose which is apparent, but also for your renown, and in order to know what happens there, and to delude France, and bring her into bad reputation, and for other objects, unknown to us."

According to Puebla, Ayala's servants fought on the streets of London, and an Englishman was killed. Ayala's Scottish chaplain was arrested for murder and returned to Scotland. Puebla and Ayala were joined in London by the Knight-Commander Sanchez Londoño and the Sub-Prior of Santa Cruz, Fray Johannes de Matienzo, on 18 July 1498. They understood that Ayala stayed in England to recruit his health rather than return to Scotland. They recognised his popularity at the English court and expertise in Scottish matters and asked him to brief Ferdinand and Isabella on the state of Scotland. They also relayed several stories to the discredit of Puebla. The historian Garrett Mattingly, writing in 1940, pointed out that Ferdinand and Isabella were probably sceptical in response to what appears to have been Ayala's effort to tarnish Puebla's reputation. Mattingly wrote as a corrective to a bias to Ayala he found in Gustav Adolf Bergenroth's introduction to the Calendar of State Papers Spain.

=== Ayala's description of Scotland ===
Both ambassadors were retained in London. Pedro de Ayala's briefing on Scotland to Ferdinand and Isabella of July 1498 is a major and much quoted source on James IV and his times. First deciphered and published by Gustav Bergenroth, the letter was brought to a wide audience by publication in Peter Hume Brown's Early Travellers in Scotland (1891). A new transcription and translation into English was published in 2026.

Ayal recommended that Spain and Scotland be allied by the marriage of the Infanta Maria to James IV, rather than leaving James to marry Margaret Tudor of England, who he described as young, small and sickly. Ayala also mentions a voyage of John Cabot from Bristol towards America, which he called the Isle of Brazil and the Seven Cities. Ayala had a copy of Cabot's map which he did not forward because he thought it worthless.

Ayala wrote that noble women in Scotland were better dressed than their English counterparts, especially regarding their head-dress. Regarding information on Scotland in Ayala's brief, the historian Norman MacDougall adds a note of caution against its uncritical use. Pedro de Ayala also discussed Scotland with the Venetian ambassador, Andrea Trevisano, who included Pedro's observations in his description of the countries of Britain for the Doge of Venice, Agostino Barbarigo.

== Catherine of Aragon and the rival ambassadors ==
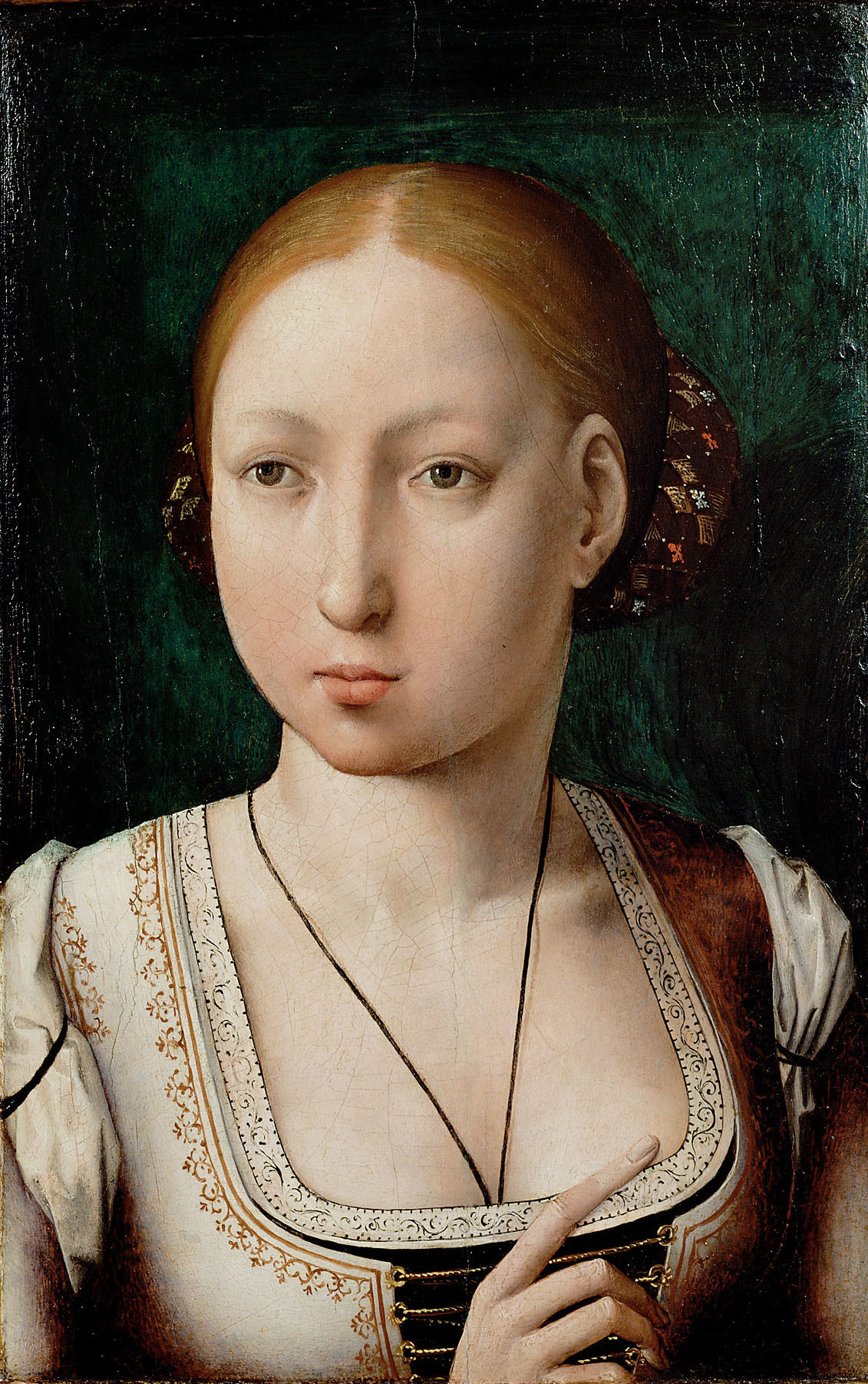
Pedro de Ayala was accused of advising Joanna, the sister of Catherine of Aragon, behind her husband's back.

Henry VII of England gave Ayala £60 in September 1499. He requested on 18 December 1500 that Ayala would stay in London at least until Catherine of Aragon arrived. Puebla wrote to Ferdinand and Isabella that Henry VII's councillors realised that Ayala was useful to England because he undermined Puebla's work. Worse, another ambassador, Don Gutierre Gómez de Fuensalida, the Knight-Commander of Haro, sent to arbitrate between them was, according to Puebla, colluding with Don Pedro. At the end of December 1501, Ayala wrote to Isabella describing the aftermath of the royal marriage. In a long letter he accused Dr Puebla of conniving with Henry VII over Catherine's jewels. He said that Henry VII had discussed with him whether Catherine should go with Arthur to Ludlow Castle. Ayala said he had sympathised with Henry's councillors who wanted the couple to stay apart and not yet live together, but he had tried to steer Catherine to insist she go to Ludlow. The couple left London on 21 December 1501.

Ayala heard that both Elizabeth of York and Margaret Beaufort opposed the marriage of James IV to Margaret Tudor, contending that she was too young to become a mother. On 25 January 1502, the feast of the Conversion of St Paul, Ayala attended the marriage by proxy of James IV to Margaret Tudor at Richmond Palace. First there was mass in the chapel, followed by the ceremony itself in the Queen's Great Chamber. Perkin Warbeck's widow Lady Catherine Gordon was also present. Pedro de Ayala sent a present of oranges to Elizabeth of York at Richmond Palace on 29 March 1502.

With the conclusion of the Scottish royal marriage, Ayala was recalled from the London embassy, and Ferdinand wrote on 1 September 1502 asking Ferdinand, Duque de Estrada, to make sure he came home. As a leaving gift, Henry VII gave him £200 on 16 September 1502, and Pedro received two valuable church appointments as Archdeacon of London on 3 September and Prebendary of Caddington Minor on 23 September. He was sent to Flanders, but by April 1503 Isabella regretted his move. While Ayala was at Malines in August 1505, Puebla complained to Ferdinand that he and Doña Elvira Manuel had persuaded Catherine of Aragon to give away a valuable collar, brocade and silverwork. Ayala was resident ambassador with the Emperor at Bruges, but returned to England in March 1506, during the visit of Philip I of Castile and his wife Joanna of Castile to Henry, Prince of Wales and Catherine of Aragon. The Venetian ambassador reported that his activities were worrying Philip, who believed Ayala was advising Joanna and influencing her behaviour.

Catherine of Aragon was unhappy with aspects of her treatment by her father-in-law, particularly respecting her financial allowance. She also felt De Puebla was not adequate to represent her, and at first she was given joint diplomatic credentials with him, but in 1507 she begged Ferdinand to send Ayala as ambassador to negotiate on her behalf;

"I wish that the ambassador who is to come to England should be a man who will dare to speak an honest word at the right time, ... send Don Pedro. Don Pedro is clever, and knows England perfectly well."

However, Don Gutierre Gómez de Fuensalida was sent instead. His embassy was not particularly successful and Garret Mattingly noted that Catherine of Aragon came to regret her distrust of Dr Puebla. Ayala was rewarded with the Bishopric of the Canary Islands on 20 October 1507, and Henry VII arranged for him to be Archdeacon of St Paul's. Dr Puebla, a man of humble and converso origin, had refused a bishopric from Henry VII. In 1498, Londoño and the Sub-Prior wrote they had heard from Spanish merchants that Puebla had asked Henry VII to make him a bishop, and the King refused because he was a cripple. (Don Pedro too was said to have been lame, such references may refer to contemporary proverbs relating lameness to untruthfulness as much as to an infirmity.) Henry VII had offered the bishopric, and then an English bride. The offer was repeated in 1499. At Calais, in June 1500, Puebla refused for the third time Elizabeth of York's offer of a rich English bride. Puebla died before the coronation of Henry VIII of England but his son, who was Preceptor of St Paul's, attended.

== Final years ==
When Henry VIII wanted to see Don Pedro again, John Stile wrote from Valladolid on 9 September 1509 that he was sick. Pedro was Dean of the Chapter of Toledo, served as Obrero, master of work in the Cathedral in 1510, and was involved in controversy over the appointment of the Archdeacon. The painter Juan de Burgoña included Pedro's coat of arms of two black wolves in the decoration of a new chapel.

Don Pedro de Ayala died in January 1513. He was buried in the Monasterio de San Juan de los Reyes in Toledo, Spain, the city of his birth. Seven months later James IV did exactly what Ayala had strived to prevent in 1497. Drawn into Henry VIII's war with France, James invaded England with his full power. He was killed at Flodden, and Scotland's Auld Alliance with France was strengthened by the regency of John Stewart, Duke of Albany.

His renaissance style tomb carried the inscription "PETRUS DE AIALA, CANARIENSIS EPISCOPUS. SANCTE ECCLESIE TOLETANE DECANUS ET REGIUS CONSILIARILUS." It was damaged during the Napoleonic invasion of Spain, and can be seen in Toledo's Museo Arqueológico in the old Hospital de Santa Cruz.

== In fiction ==
A character of Pedro de Ayala appears in John Ford's play Perkin Warbeck, (c. 1629–1634) as 'Hialas', his name as it appears in English chronicles. Hialas first meets secretly with Henry VII in England at the opening of Act III Scene III, then Hialas and the Bishop of Durham debate peace and Warbeck with James IV at the opening of Act IV Scene III. Hialas is present at the end of the play but has no lines, (unless he was intended to voice the epilogue.) Ford's play derives in part from Francis Bacon's The History of the Reign of King Henry VII (1622).

== Sources ==
- Accounts of the Lord High Treasurer of Scotland, vol. 1, HM Register House, Edinburgh (1877)
- Duke of Alba and Berwick, Correspondencia de Gutierre Gómez de Fuensalida, Embajador en Alemania, Flandes é Inglaterra, Madrid (1907)
- Bain, Joseph, ed., Calendar of Documents relating to Scotland, 1357–1509, vol. 4, HM Register House, Edinburgh (1888)
- Buchanan, George, trans. Aikman, James, History of Scotland, Glasgow, vol, 2, (1827), pp. 236–7 (Bk. 13 Cap. 17)
- Bergenroth, Gustav Adolf, ed., Calendar of State Papers Spain, vol. 1 (1862)
- Cody, E. G., The Historie of Scotland by Jhone Leslie translated by Father James Dalrymple, vol. 2, Scottish History Society (1895)
- Dunlop, David, 'The 'Masked Comedian': Perkin Warbeck's Adventures in Scotland and England from 1495 to 1497,' Scottish Historical Review, vol. 70, no. 90, (October 1991), pp. 97–128.
- Gairdner, James, ed., Letters and papers illustrative of the reigns of Richard III and Henry VII, vol. 1, Longman, London, (1861)
- Leland, John, De Rebus Britannicis Collectanea, .., ed., Hearne, Thomas, vol. 4, (1770) John Young's relation of the Scottish Marriage, pp. 258–300
- MacDougall, Norman, James IV, Tuckwell (1997)
- Mattingly, Garret, 'The Reputation of Dr De Puebla,' EHR, vol. 55, no. 267 (1940), pp. 27–47
- Prescott, William Hickling, History of the reign of Ferdinand and Isabella, Bentley, London (1842)
- Ridpath, George, (revised Ridpath, William), The Border History of England and Scotland, Berwick, (1848), facsimile reprint, Mercat Press, Edinburgh (1979)
- Rymer, Thomas, ed., Foedera, conventiones, literae,... inter Reges Angliae et alios, vol.12 (1711) (Latin), treaty of Ayton, pp. 670–680,
- Rymer, Thomas, Foedera, conventiones, literae,... inter Reges Angliae et alios, vol. 5 part 1 & 2, Johannes Neaulm, Hague, (1741) (Latin), relevant material as in vol. 12 in edition above, part 2, pp. 20–24, treaty of Woking; pp. 120–123, text of treaty of Ayton. (2 volumes with separate page numbering)
- Trevisano, Andrea; Sneyd, Charlotte Augusta, ed., A relation of true account of the Island of England, ... about the year 1500, Camden Society (1847)
- Calendar State Papers Milan, vol. 1 (1912)
- Calendar State Papers Venice, vol. 1, (1864)

Catholic Church titles
Preceded by Diego de Muros	Bishop of Islas Canarias; 1507–1513	Succeeded by Fernando Vázquez de Arce
