= Pedro Suárez de Deza (died 1206) =

Spanish Roman Catholic archbishop

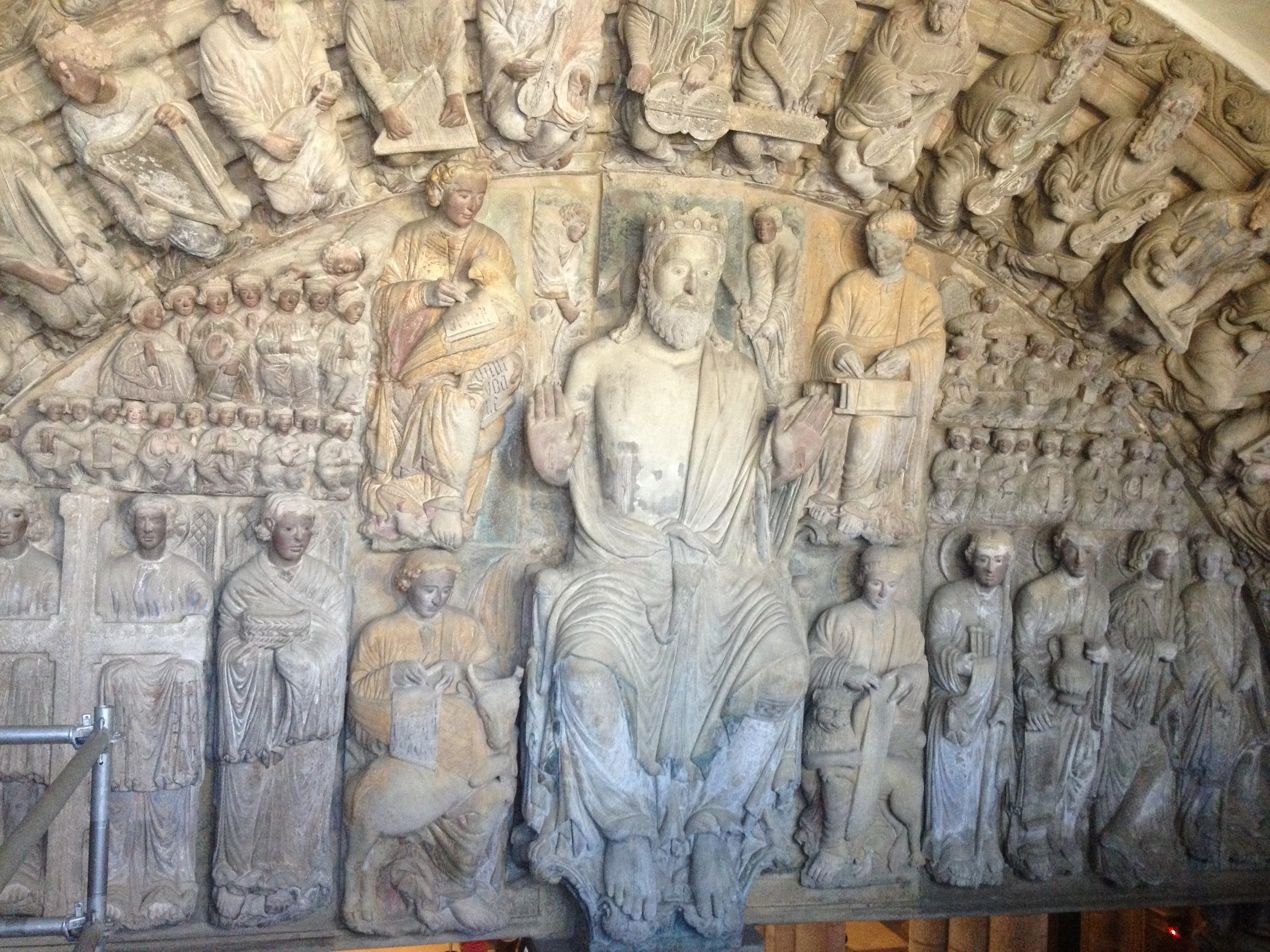
Christ Pantocrator, from the Portico of Glory completed under Pedro Suárez

Pedro Suárez de Deza (died 1206) was a Spanish prelate, the bishop of Salamanca from 1166 until his transfer to the archbishopric of Santiago de Compostela in 1173, where he remained until his death. In 1183 he served as chancellor of the kingdom of León. Of his stature in the Leonese kingdom, Roger Wright claims that he "would probably be now ... widely celebrated ... if he had only had a biographer", like his predecessor, Diego Gelmírez, did.

== Background ==
A native of Galicia, Pedro was probably educated at the University of Paris, where he earned the title of magister. Letters he later received from Pope Innocent III indicate that he had studied and taught theology at some point. He is in fact the only Leonese bishop of the twelfth century known to have studied theology. He introduced reformed medieval Latin orthography to the see of Salamanca and may also have introduced in the Leonese chancery. Perhaps also in canon law, at Compostela he patronised canon lawyers like Bernardus Compostellanus Antiquus. By August 1162, Pedro had returned from Paris to Compostela and was probably a canon there. He was appointed a chancellor by King Ferdinand II in 1165. By 1166 he had become an archdeacon at Compostela and was working in the household of Archbishop Martín Martínez. He was consecrated to the see of Salamanca by Pope Alexander III in Rome.

As bishop of Salamanca, Pedro worked to achieve harmony with his fellow bishops. He negotiated an agreement of confraternity between the cathedral chapters of Salamanca and the neighbouring diocese of Ávila across the border in Castile. He negotiated settlements to boundary disputes with the diocese of Ciudad Rodrigo, drew the diocese of Salamanca into closer relations with the papacy and supported the new Spanish military orders, the Order of Santiago and Order of Alcántara. So far as was possible, he maintained good relations with both his own king and the king of Castile, Alfonso VIII, who were often at odds. It is probable, although contemporary evidence does not survive, that intellectual life first flourished at Salamanca under him. In 1173, he was translated to the see of Santiago. His successor at Salamanca, Vitalis, had perhaps been his protégé. The bishop of Zamora from 1193 to 1217, Martín Arias, was likely also a protégé of Pedro.

The sources for Pedro's long 33-year tenure of the archdiocese of Santiago are surprisingly meagre. He came to the see of decades of disruption, which culminated in the dispute with the king in 1160–61. Much of the diocese's temporalities had been annexed by the crown or usurped by the Galician aristocracy, and the suffragan dioceses did not acknowledge the archbishop's authority. Pedro nonetheless maintained good relations with the Ferdinand II and Alfonso IX, even when the kingdom came under papal interdict because of Alfonso's incestuous marriage. He also settled many disputes with the nobility. In 1176, Pedro accompanied the king on his expedition against Jerez.

Pedro reformed the administration of the archdiocese and enacted regulations for the cathedral chapter. He secured a steady revenue through the votos de Santiago, regular donations to the Saint James in gratitude for his military assistance. The construction of the cathedral of Saint James, suspended between 1140 and 1173, he resumed. During his episcopate the Portico of Glory was added.

At Compostela, Pedro maintained a close relationship with the papacy as he had done in Salamanca. He received papal support for his reforms, and he attended the Third Lateran Council in 1179. From Innocent III he got rulings that the dioceses of Évora, Idanha, Lamego and Lisbon were his suffragans, but he had to give up claims on Coimbra and Viseu. He did not receive a ruling on Zamora.

== Sources ==
- Armesto, Victoria (1971). Galicia feudal (2nd ed.). Vigo: Galaxia.
- Ayala Martínez, Carlos de (2015). "El obispo Pedro Suárez de Deza. Política y teología a finales del siglo XII". In Ricardo Córdoba de la Llave; José Luis del Pino García; Margarita Cabrera Sánchez (eds.). Estudios en homenaje al profesor Emilio Cabrera. Córdoba: Servicio de Publicaciones de la Universidad de Córdoba. pp. 35–48.
- Fletcher, Richard (1978). The Episcopate in the Kingdom of León in the Twelfth Century. Oxford: Oxford University Press.
- Wright, Roger (2015). "Galician Before 1250". In James D'Emilio (ed.). Culture and Society in Medieval Galicia: A Cultural Crossroads at the Edge of Europe. Leiden: Brill. pp. 843–61.
