= Luis Cabeza de Vaca =

16th-century Spanish bishop

Most Reverend Luis Cabeza de Vaca
- Bishop of Palencia
- Church: Catholic Church
- Diocese: Roman Catholic Diocese of Palencia
- In office: 1537–1550
- Predecessor: Francisco Mendoza
- Successor: Pedro de la Gasca
- Previous posts: Bishop of Salamanca (1530–1537); Bishop of Islas Canarias (1523–1530)

Personal details
- Born: c. 1465 Jaén, Spain
- Died: November 22, 1550

Luis Cabeza de Vaca (c. 1465 – November 22, 1550) served as Bishop of Palencia, (1537–1550), Bishop of Salamanca (1530–1537), and Bishop of Islas Canarias (1523–1530).

== Biography ==
On March 11, 1523 Pope Adrian VI appointed him Bishop of Islas Canarias. On June 22, 1530, Pope Clement VII appointed him Bishop of Salamanca. On April 14, 1537, Pope Paul III appointed him Bishop of Palencia. He died on November 22, 1550.

While Bishop, he was the principal consecrator of Jerónimo de Loaysa, Bishop of Cartagena (1538), and principal co-consecrator of Jorge de Austria, Bishop of Brixen (1539).

== External links and additional sources ==
- Cheney, David M. "Diocese of Islas Canarias". Catholic-Hierarchy.org. (for Chronology of Bishops)^{self-published}
- Chow, Gabriel. "Diocese of Islas Canarias {Canary Islands} (Spain)". GCatholic.org. (for Chronology of Bishops)^{self-published}
- Cheney, David M. "Diocese of Palencia". Catholic-Hierarchy.org. (for Chronology of Bishops) ^{[self-published]}
- Chow, Gabriel. "Diocese of Palencia (Spain)". GCatholic.org. (for Chronology of Bishops) ^{[self-published]}

Catholic Church titles
Preceded by Fernando Vázquez de Arce	Bishop of Islas Canarias; 1523–1530	Succeeded by Pedro Fernández Manrique
Preceded by Francisco Bobadilla	Bishop of Salamanca; 1530–1537	Succeeded by Rodrigo Mendoza Manrique
Preceded by Francisco Mendoza	Bishop of Palencia; 1537–1550	Succeeded by Pedro de la Gasca
