= Francisco Bobadilla =

Spanish Roman Catholic prelate

Most Reverend Francisco de Cabrera y Bobadilla
- Bishop of Salamanca
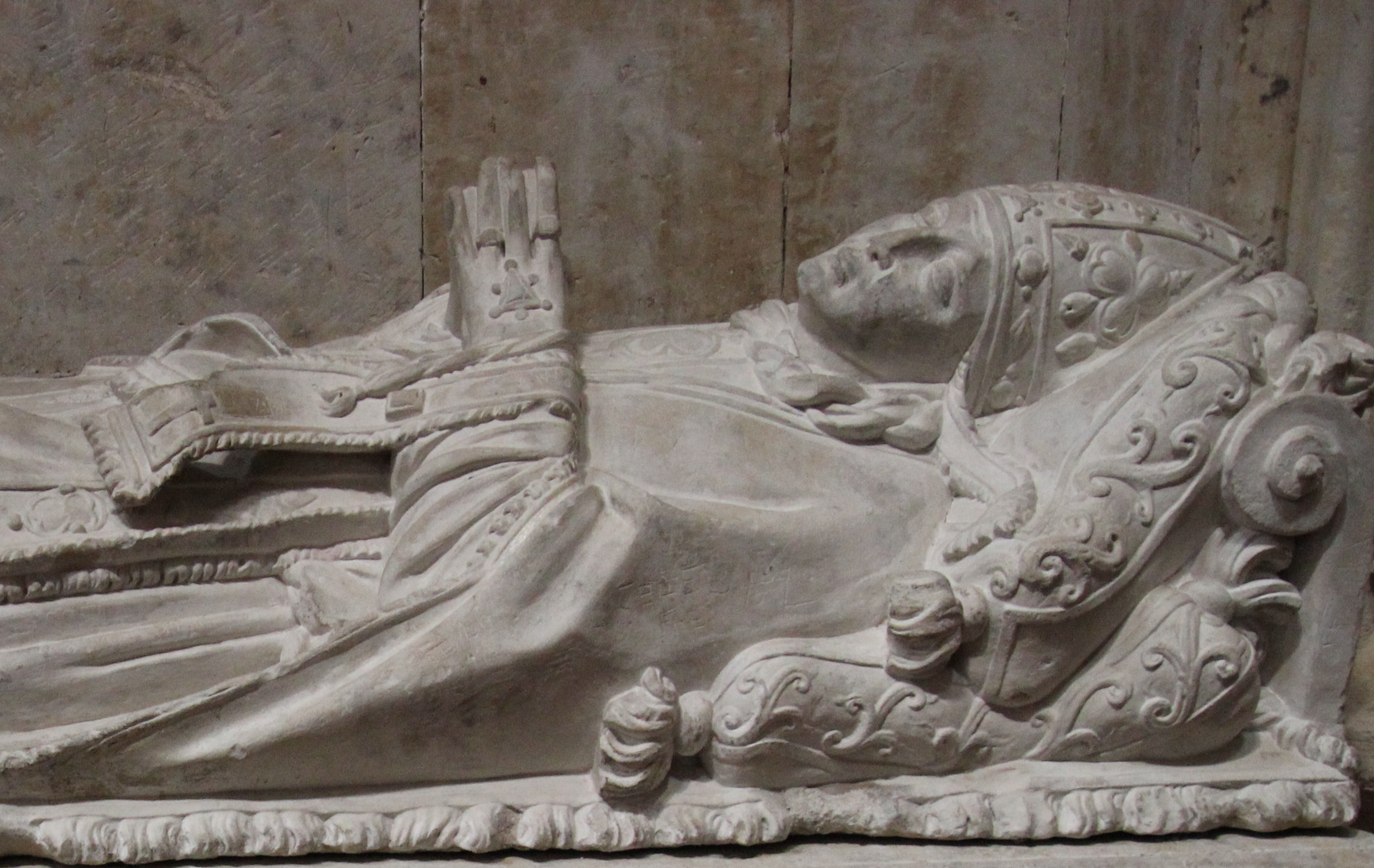
- Church: Catholic Church
- Diocese: Diocese of Salamanca
- In office: 1510–1529
- Predecessor: Juan de Castilla
- Successor: Luis Cabeza de Vaca
- Previous post: Bishop of Ciudad Rodrigo (1509–1510)

Personal details
- Died: 29 August 1529

Francisco de Cabrera y Bobadilla (died 29 August 1529) was a Roman Catholic prelate who served as Bishop of Salamanca (1510–1529) and Bishop of Ciudad Rodrigo (1509–1510).

== Biography ==
He was the third son of Andrés de Cabrera, 1st Marquess of Moya and Beatriz de Bobadilla.
On 22 January 1509 Francisco Bobadilla was selected by the King of Spain and confirmed by Pope Julius II as Bishop of Ciudad Rodrigo. On 18 November 1510 he was appointed by the King of Spain and confirmed by Pope Julius II as Bishop of Salamanca. He served as Bishop of Salamanca until his death on 29 August 1529. While Bishop, he was the principal consecrator of Vicente de Peraza, Bishop of Panamá (1521).

== See also ==
- Catholic Church in Spain

== External links and additional sources ==
- Cheney, David M. "Diocese of Ciudad Rodrigo". Catholic-Hierarchy.org. (for Chronology of Bishops) ^{[self-published]}
- Chow, Gabriel. "Diocese of Ciudad Rodrigo". GCatholic.org. (for Chronology of Bishops) ^{[self-published]}

Catholic Church titles
| Preceded by Valeriano Ordóñez Villaquirán | Bishop of Ciudad Rodrigo; 1509–1510 | Succeeded by Francisco Ruiz |
| Preceded by Juan de Castilla | Bishop of Salamanca; 1510–1529 | Succeeded by Luis Cabeza de Vaca |
