= Fernando Vázquez de Arce =

Bishop of Islas Canarias (1513–1520)

Most Reverend Fernando Vázquez de Arce
- Bishop of Islas Canarias
- Church: Catholic Church
- Diocese: Diocese of Islas Canarias
- In office: 1513–1520
- Predecessor: Pedro López Ayala
- Successor: Luis Cabeza de Vaca

Personal details
- Died: 1520 Canary Islands, Spain

Fernando Vázquez de Arce (died 1520) was a Roman Catholic prelate who served as Bishop of Islas Canarias (1513–1520).

== Biography ==
On 20 May 1513, Fernando Vázquez de Arce was appointed during the papacy of Pope Leo X as Bishop of Islas Canarias. He served as Bishop of Islas Canarias until his death in 1520.

== External links and additional sources ==
- Cheney, David M. "Diocese of Islas Canarias". Catholic-Hierarchy.org. (for Chronology of Bishops)^{self-published}
- Chow, Gabriel. "Diocese of Islas Canarias {Canary Islands} (Spain)". GCatholic.org. (for Chronology of Bishops)^{self-published}

Catholic Church titles
Preceded by Pedro López Ayala	Bishop of Islas Canarias; 1513–1520	Succeeded by Luis Cabeza de Vaca
