= Francisco Desprats =

Spanish Roman Catholic bishop and cardinal

Francisco Desprats (1454–1504) (called the Cardinal of León) was a Spanish Roman Catholic bishop and cardinal.

== Biography ==
Francisco Desprats was born in Orihuela in 1454. He was educated at the University of Lleida, becoming a doctor of both laws.

Early in his career, he became a canon of the cathedral chapter of Orihuela Cathedral. In March 1483, he became the pastor of Almoradí. In 1483, he traveled to Rome, joining the household of Cardinal Roderic Llançol i de Borja (who later became Pope Alexander VI) and becoming a protonotary apostolic. In July 1486, he became canon schoolmaster of the cathedral chapter of Cartagena Cathedral. In 1492, Pope Alexander VI made him the Holy See's first permanent nuncio, to the Catholic Monarchs.

He was elected Bishop of Catania on February 14, 1498. He was transferred to the see of Astorga on February 9, 1500; he occupied this see from February 5, 1501 until his death.

Pope Alexander VI made him a cardinal priest in the consistory of May 31, 1503. He received the titulus of Santi Sergio e Bacco (a deaconry raised pro illa vice to the status of titulus) on June 12, 1503.

He participated in both the papal conclave of September 1503 that elected Pope Pius III and the papal conclave of October 1503 that elected Pope Julius II.

He died in Rome on September 10, 1504. He is buried in San Salvatore in Lauro.

Catholic Church titles
Preceded by Juan Daza	Bishop of Catania; 1498–1500	Succeeded by Diego Ramírez de Guzmán
Preceded by Diego Ramírez de Villaescua de Haro	Bishop of Astorga; 1500	Succeeded by Sancho Pérez Rodríguez de Acebes
Preceded by Alonso de Valdivieso	Bishop of León; 1501–1504	Succeeded by Juan de Vera
Preceded by Giuliano Cesarini	Cardinal-Priest of Santi Sergio e Bacco; 1503–1504	Succeeded by Giovanni Stefano Ferrero
