= Francisco Sánchez Villanueva y Vega =

Spanish Roman Catholic prelate

Most Reverend Francisco Sánchez Villanueva y Vega
- Bishop Emeritus of Islas Canarias
- Church: Catholic Church
- Diocese: Diocese of Islas Canarias
- In office: 1635–1651
- Predecessor: Cristóbal de la Cámara y Murga
- Successor: Rodrigo Gutiérrez de Rojas
- Previous posts: Archbishop of Taranto (1627–1630); Archbishop (Personal Title) of Mazara del Vallo (1630–1635)

Orders
- Consecration: 13 February 1628 by Ludovico Ludovisi

Personal details
- Born: January 1581 Madrid, Spain
- Died: 4 February 1658 (age 77)

Francisco Sánchez Villanueva y Vega (1581–1658) was a Roman Catholic prelate who served as Archbishop (Personal Title) of Islas Canarias (1635–1651), Archbishop (Personal Title) of Mazara del Vallo (1630–1635), and Archbishop of Taranto (1627–1630).

== Biography ==
Francisco Sánchez Villanueva y Vega was born in Madrid, Spain in January 1581. On 10 August 1627, he was selected as Archbishop of Taranto and confirmed by Pope Urban VIII on 24 January 1628. On 13 February 1628, he was consecrated bishop by Ludovico Ludovisi, Cardinal-Priest of San Lorenzo in Damaso. On 23 September 1630, he was appointed during the papacy of Pope Urban VIII as Archbishop (Personal Title) of Mazara del Vallo. On 9 July 1635, he was appointed during the papacy of Pope Urban VIII as Archbishop (Personal Title) of Islas Canarias. He served as Archbishop of Islas Canarias until his resignation in 1651. He died on 4 February 1658.

While bishop, he was the principal consecrator of Alfonso de Franco y Luna, Bishop of Durango (1632); and Luis García Rodríguez, Bishop of Orense (1634).

== External links and additional sources ==
- Cheney, David M. "Diocese of Mazara del Vallo". Catholic-Hierarchy.org. (for Chronology of Bishops) ^{[self-published]}
- Chow, Gabriel. "Diocese of Mazara del Vallo (Italy)". GCatholic.org. (for Chronology of Bishops) ^{[self-published]}
- Cheney, David M. "Diocese of Islas Canarias". Catholic-Hierarchy.org. (for Chronology of Bishops) ^{[self-published]}
- Chow, Gabriel. "Diocese of Islas Canarias {Canary Islands} (Spain)". GCatholic.org. (for Chronology of Bishops) ^{[self-published]}

Catholic Church titles
Preceded by Antonio d'Aquino	Archbishop of Taranto; 1627–1630	Succeeded by Gil Carrillo de Albornoz
Preceded by Marco La Cava	Archbishop (Personal Title) of Mazara del Vallo; 1630–1635	Succeeded by Giovanni Domenico Spinola
Preceded by Cristóbal de la Cámara y Murga	Archbishop (Personal Title) of Islas Canarias; 1635–1651	Succeeded by Rodrigo Gutiérrez de Rojas
