= Diego Ramírez de Fuenleal =

Spanish Catholic bishop (1459–1537)

His Excellency Diego Ramírez de Fuenleal
- Bishop of Cuenca
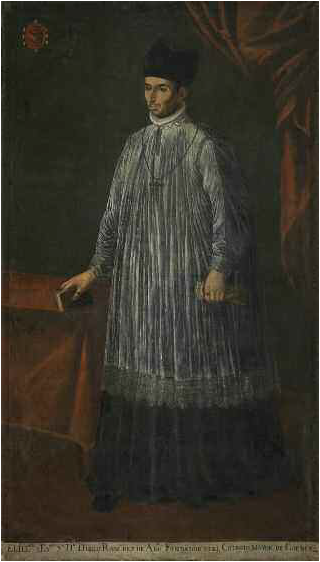
- Church: Catholic Church
- Diocese: Diocese of Cuenca
- In office: 1518–1537
- Predecessor: Raffaele Sansone Riario
- Successor: Alessandro Cesarini
- Previous posts: Bishop of Astorga (1498–1500); Bishop of Málaga (1500–1518)

Personal details
- Born: 7 December 1459
- Died: 11 August 1537 (age 77) Cuenca, Spain

Diego Ramírez de Fuenleal (7 December 1459 – 11 August 1537) (also known as Diego Ramírez de Haro, Diego Ramírez de Villaescusa, or Diego Ramírez de Arellano) was a Roman Catholic prelate who served as Bishop of Cuenca (1518–1537), Bishop of Málaga (1500–1518), and Bishop of Astorga (1498–1500).

== Biography ==
Diego Ramírez de Fuenleal was born on 7 December 1459. In 1498, he was appointed during the papacy of Pope Alexander VI as Bishop of Astorga. On 7 February 1500, he was appointed during the papacy of Pope Alexander VI as Bishop of Málaga. In 1518, he was appointed during the papacy of Pope Leo X as Bishop of Cuenca. He served as Bishop of Cuenca until his death on 11 August 1537. While bishop, he was the principal co-consecrator of Fernando Valdés, Bishop of Elne (1529).

== External links and additional sources ==
- Cheney, David M. "Diocese of Astorga". Catholic-Hierarchy.org. (for Chronology of Bishops) ^{[self-published]}
- Chow, Gabriel. "Diocese of Astorga (Spain)". GCatholic.org. (for Chronology of Bishops) ^{[self-published]}
- Cheney, David M. "Diocese of Málaga". Catholic-Hierarchy.org. (for Chronology of Bishops) ^{[self-published]}
- Chow, Gabriel. "Diocese of Málaga (Spain)". GCatholic.org. (for Chronology of Bishops) ^{[self-published]}
- Cheney, David M. "Diocese of Cuenca". Catholic-Hierarchy.org. (for Chronology of Bishops) ^{[self-published]}
- Chow, Gabriel. "Diocese of Cuenca (Spain)". GCatholic.org. (for Chronology of Bishops) ^{[self-published]}

Catholic Church titles
Preceded by Juan de Castilla	Bishop of Astorga; 1498–1500	Succeeded by Francisco Desprats
Preceded by Pedro Díaz de Toledo y Ovalle	Bishop of Málaga; 1500–1518	Succeeded by Raffaele Sansone Riario
Preceded by Raffaele Sansone Riario	Bishop of Cuenca; 1518–1537	Succeeded by Alessandro Cesarini
