= Juan de Castilla =

Roman Catholic prelate

Most Reverend Juan de Castilla
- Bishop of Salamanca
- Church: Catholic Church
- In office: 1498–1510
- Predecessor: Diego de Deza
- Successor: Francisco Bobadilla
- Previous post: Bishop of Astorga (1494–1498)

Personal details
- Born: 1460 Palencia, Spain
- Died: 1510 (age 50) Salamanca, Spain

Juan de Castilla (1460–1510) was a Roman Catholic prelate who served as Bishop of Salamanca (1498–1510) and Bishop of Astorga (1494–1498).

== Biography ==
Juan de Castilla was born in Palencia, Spain in 1460. In 1494, he was appointed during the papacy of Pope Alexander VI as Bishop of Astorga. In 1498, he was appointed during the papacy of Pope Alexander VI as Bishop of Salamanca. He served as Bishop of Salamanca until his death in 1510. While bishop, he was the principal co-consecrator of Pascual Rebenga de Ampudia, Bishop of Burgos (1497).

== See also ==
- Catholic Church in Spain

== External links and additional sources ==
- Cheney, David M. "Diocese of Astorga". Catholic-Hierarchy.org. (for Chronology of Bishops) ^{[self-published]}
- Chow, Gabriel. "Diocese of Astorga (Spain)". GCatholic.org. (for Chronology of Bishops) ^{[self-published]}

Catholic Church titles
Preceded by Diego Meléndez de Valdés	Bishop of Astorga; 1494–1498	Succeeded by Diego Ramírez de Fuenleal
Preceded by Diego de Deza	Bishop of Salamanca; 1498–1510	Succeeded by Francisco Bobadilla
