= Diego Meléndez de Valdés =

Roman Catholic prelate

Most Reverend Diego Meléndez de Valdés
- Bishop of Zamora
- Church: Catholic Church
- Diocese: Diocese of Zamora
- In office: 1494–1506
- Predecessor: Juan de Mella
- Successor: Diego de Deza

Personal details
- Born: 1446 Zamora, Spain
- Died: 27 December 1506 (aged 59–60) Rome, Italy

Diego Meléndez de Valdés (Zamora, 1447 – Rome, 27 December 1506) was a Castilian Roman Catholic prelate and art patron who served as Bishop of Astorga (1493–1494) and Bishop of Zamora (1494–1506). A member of an influential Zamoran noble family, he spent most of his career at the papal court in Rome, where from 1498 he served Pope Alexander VI as magister domus (majordomo) of the papal household. He never took up residence in his Spanish sees, governing Zamora through vicars, but used the diocesan revenues to fund extensive building and furnishing campaigns at Zamora Cathedral and the church of San Pedro y San Ildefonso, and in Rome he was a governor and major benefactor of the church and hospice of Santiago de los Españoles, where he founded a chapel and was buried in a Renaissance tomb attributed to the workshop of Andrea Bregno.

== Biography ==
Diego Meléndez de Valdés belonged to a noble Zamoran family of Asturian origin. He was the son of Rodrigo de Valdés, a courtier who served as halconero mayor (royal falconer) to King Henry IV of Castile and represented Zamora in the Cortes of Castile, and of María (or Juana) de Porres. His elder brother, Francisco de Valdés, was a councillor to the Catholic Monarchs and, in 1476, helped open the city of Zamora to their forces during its occupation by King Afonso V of Portugal. A funerary inscription in Zamora Cathedral, where his father and grandfather were later reinterred in a chapel he commissioned, records the family's lineage.

Born in Zamora in 1447, Meléndez de Valdés studied in nearby Salamanca before moving to Rome, where he worked as a papal scriptor and apostolic notary.

In 1483, on the death of Bishop Gonzalo Pérez de Vivero, the Catholic Monarchs Ferdinand and Isabella sent Meléndez de Valdés to Rome to secure the vacant see of Salamanca for their preferred candidate, Fray Hernando de Talavera, prior of the Hieronymite monastery of El Prado. Instead, he petitioned Pope Sixtus IV for the appointment himself and was named bishop of Salamanca on 15 January 1483. The move provoked a protracted conflict between the Crown and the papacy: the monarchs refused to recognise the appointment, repeatedly demanded its revocation through their agents in Rome, and in 1485 formally threatened Meléndez de Valdés with the loss of his Castilian nationality and property if he did not resign the see. He nonetheless held the title, without ever taking possession of the diocese, until 16 November 1491, when he finally ceded it in exchange for the Crown's agreement to his later promotion elsewhere.

In 1493, Diego Meléndez de Valdés was appointed during the papacy of Pope Alexander VI as Bishop of Astorga. In 1494, he was appointed during the papacy of Pope Gregory XIII as Bishop of Zamora. He served as Bishop of Zamora until his death in 1506.

== External links and additional sources ==
- Cheney, David M. "Diocese of Astorga". Catholic-Hierarchy.org. (for Chronology of Bishops) ^{[self-published]}
- Chow, Gabriel. "Diocese of Astorga (Spain)". GCatholic.org. (for Chronology of Bishops) ^{[self-published]}
- Cheney, David M. "Diocese of Zamora". Catholic-Hierarchy.org. (for Chronology of Bishops) ^{[self-published]}
- Chow, Gabriel. "Diocese of Zamora (Spain)". GCatholic.org. (for Chronology of Bishops) ^{[self-published]}

Catholic Church titles
Preceded by Juan Ruiz de Medina	Bishop of Astorga; 1493–1494	Succeeded by Juan de Castilla
Preceded by Juan de Mella	Bishop of Zamora; 1494–1506	Succeeded by Diego de Deza
