= Diocese of Astorga =

Roman Catholic diocese in Spain

Diocese of Astorga Dioecesis Asturicensis Diócesis de Astorga

Catholic
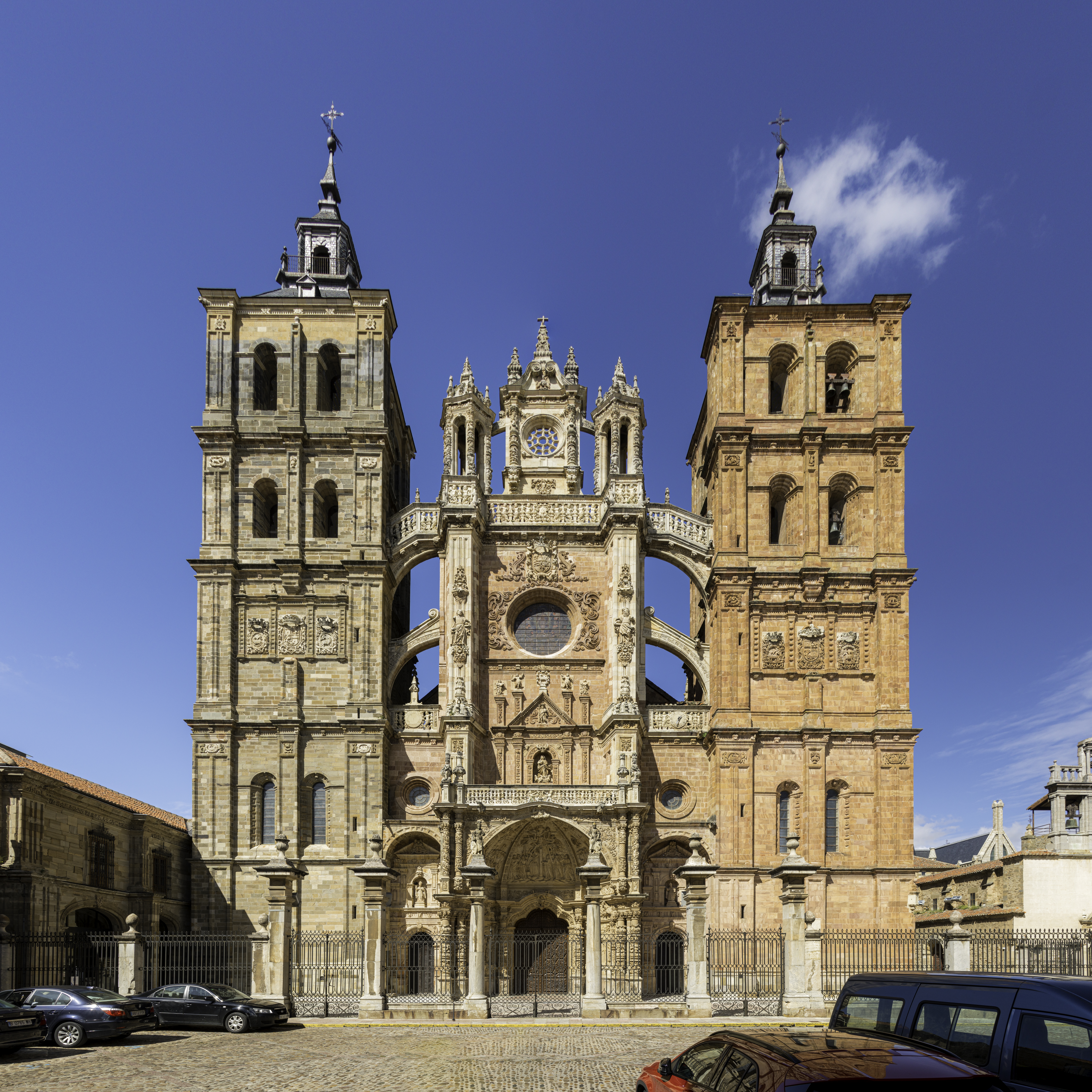
- Astorga Cathedral

Location
- Country: Spain
- Ecclesiastical province: Oviedo
- Metropolitan: Oviedo

Statistics
- Area: 11,683 km^{2} (4,511 sq mi)
- Population: Total; Catholics: (as of 2023); 235,300; 227,400 (96.6%)
- Parishes: 974

Information
- Denomination: Roman Catholic
- Sui iuris church: Latin Church
- Rite: Roman Rite
- Established: 747
- Cathedral: Cathedral of the Assumption of Our Lady in Astroga
- Secular priests: 155 Diocesan, 12 Religious Orders

Current leadership
- Pope: Leo XIV
- Bishop: Sede Vacante
- Metropolitan Archbishop: Jesús Sanz Montes, O.F.M.

Map
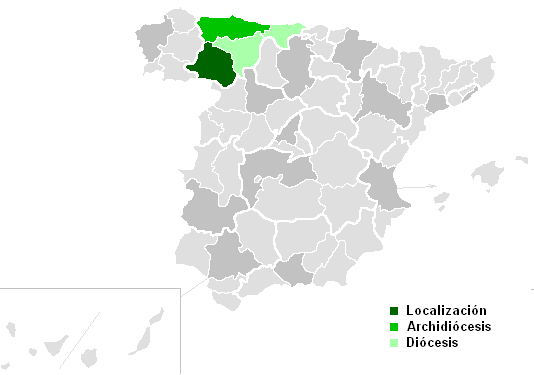

Website
- Website of the Diocese

The Diocese of Astorga (Latin: Dioecesis Asturicensis) is a Latin Church diocese of the Catholic Church whose seat is in the city of Astorga, in the province of León, Castile and León, Spain.

The diocese is a part of the ecclesiastical province of the Roman Catholic Archdiocese of Oviedo since 1954. It traces its foundation to the 3rd century, making it one of the oldest in Spain.

== History ==
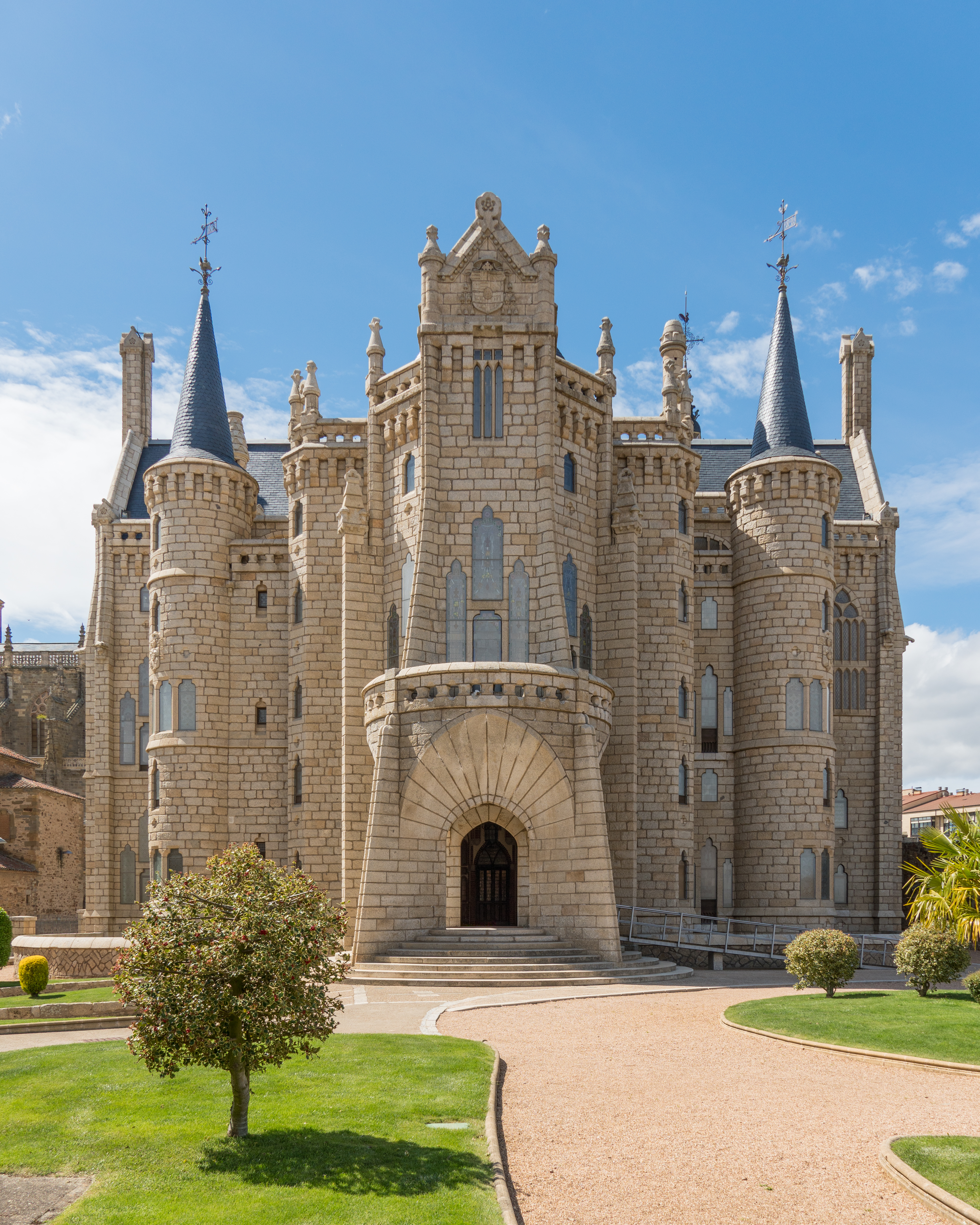
Episcopal Palace of Astorga, by Antoni Gaudi

The first bishop for whom there is any documentary evidence was Belisarius, who served during the reign (from 249 to 251) of the Emperor Decius and faced the persecution waged under this ruler. The bishop was dismissed from his position, accused of having been a libellaticus, i.e., a Christian who had offered sacrifice to the Roman gods to avoid arrest. The bishop was re-instated after the intervention of the prominent African bishop, Cyprian, and Pope Stephen I. It was a suffragan of the Archdiocese of Braga

The next bishop, Sabinus, led the Christian community through the persecution of the Emperor Valerian. The Christians martyred during this period included the schoolboys saints, Justus and Pastor, as well as their aunt, Martha, who became the patron saint of the diocese. The diocese was represented at the Synod of Elvira (ca. A.D. 305), the first major assembly of the Church in Hispania.

During the waves of invasion of the peninsula by the Germanic tribes, one bishop was the noted Turibio. He documented the conversion of the Suebic King Resimund to Arianism, and worked to restore the churches destroyed by the Visigothic King Theodoric II. The bishop was able to travel to Rome, from which he brought back what is believed to be a relic of the True Cross, for which he founded the Monastery of Santo Toribio de Liébana, where it is still preserved.

== Present ==
The diocese maintains its own school of formation for its clergy, the Seminary of the Immaculate Conception, which was founded on 1 November 1766, with the current structure being built in 1799.

== Prelates ==
- Pedro da Fonseca (5 Jun 1413 – 7 Jun 1419 Resigned)
- Bernardino López de Carvajal y Sande (27 Aug 1488 – 23 Jan 1489 Appointed Bishop of Badajoz)
- Juan Ruiz de Medina (1489–1493 Appointed Bishop of Badajoz)
- Diego Meléndez de Valdés (1493–1494 Appointed Bishop of Zamora)
- Juan de Castilla (1494–1498 Appointed Bishop of Salamanca)
- Diego Ramírez de Fuenleal (1498 – 7 Feb 1500 Appointed Bishop of Malaga)
- Francisco Desprats (9 Feb–4 Dec 1500 Appointed Bishop of León)
- Sancho Pérez Rodríguez de Acebes (4 Dec 1500 – 21 Apr 1515 Died)
- Alvaro Osorio, O.P. (1 Jun 1515 – 10 Apr 1539 Died)
- Esteban Almeida (18 Aug 1539 – 2 Jun 1542 Appointed Bishop of León)
- Diego Alava Esquivel (8 Jun 1543 – 7 May 1548 Appointed Bishop of Ávila)
- Pedro Acuña Avellaneda (4 Jun 1548 – 5 Jun 1555 Appointed Bishop of Salamanca)
- Diego Sarmiento Sotomayor (5 Jun 1555 – 1571 Died)
- Francisco Sarmiento Mendoza (4 Jun 1574 – 27 May 1580 Appointed Bishop of Jaén)
- Alfonso Delgado (22 Jun 1580 – 21 Aug 1583 Died)
- Antonio Torres (bishop) (9 Jan 1584 – 14 Feb 1588 Died)
- Alberto Aguayo, O.P. (8 Aug 1588 – 16 Dec 1589 Died)
- Juan Zarzola (17 Apr 1589 – 1 Nov 1590 Died)
- Pedro Rojas Henríques, O.S.A. (6 Mar 1591 – 30 Aug 1595 Appointed Bishop of Osma)
- Antonio de Cáceres, O.P. (8 Nov 1595 – 18 Aug 1615 Died)
- Alfonso Mesía de Tovar (27 Feb 1616 – 13 Jul 1636 Died)
- Luis García Rodríguez (9 Feb 1637 – 18 Apr 1638 Died)
- Diego Salcedo Benacos (11 Apr 1639 – 28 Mar 1644 Died)
- Bernardo Atayde de Lima Perera (14 Nov 1644 – 5 Oct 1654 Appointed Bishop of Ávila)
- Nicolás Martinez (bishop), O.S.H. (9 Nov 1654 – 21 Jun 1660 Appointed Bishop of Osma)
- Juan Vallejo (20 Sep 1660 – 8 Oct 1661 Died)
- Nicolás Rodríguez Hermosino (5 Jun 1662 – 23 Jan 1669 Died)
- Matías de Moratinos y Santos (5 Aug 1669 – 3 Oct 1672 Appointed Bishop of Segovia)
- Rodrigo de Mandia y Parga (12 Dec 1672 – 20 Oct 1674 Died)
- Diego de Silva y Pacheco, O.S.B. (27 May 1675 – 22 Mar 1677 Died)
- Francisco Aguado (13 Sep 1677 – 14 Feb 1688 Died)
- Antonio de Brizuela y Salamanca (13 Sep 1688 – 13 Apr 1693 Appointed Bishop of Jaén)
- Antonio Sanjurjo Miranda, O.P. (8 Jun 1693 – Jan 1707 Died)
- José Aparicio y Navarro (28 Nov 1707 – 30 Jan 1723 Died)
- Crisóstomo Vargas, O. Cist. (30 Aug 1723 – 14 May 1728 Died)
- José Francisco Bermúdez Mandía (15 Nov 1728 – 3 Mar 1736 Died)
- Pedro Cáceres Casado (27 Jan 1738 – 15 Sep 1747 Died)
- Matías Escalzo Acedo (4 Mar 1748 – 11 Nov 1749 Died)
- Francisco Javier Sánchez Cabezón (27 Apr 1750 – 27 Jan 1767 Died)
- Juan Manuel Merino y Lumbreras (1 Jun 1767 – 5 Aug 1782 Died)
- Antonio Andrés López Arroyo, O.F.M. (15 Dec 1783 – 14 Mar 1787 Died)
- Manuel Abad y Lasierra, O.S.B. (28 Sep 1787 – 9 Apr 1791 Resigned)
- Francisco Isidoro Gutiérrez Vigil (11 Apr 1791 – 13 Oct 1805 Died)
- Manuel Vicente Martínez y Jiménez (31 Mar 1806 – 22 Jul 1816 Appointed Archbishop of Zaragoza)
- Santiago Bencomo y Rodríguez (1 Oct 1817 – 2 Mar 1818 Died)
- Guillermo Martínez Riaguas (29 Mar 1819 – 24 Oct 1824 Died)
- Manuel Bernardo Morete Bodelón (21 Mar 1825 – 2 Jan 1828 Died)
- Leonardo Santander y Villavicencio (23 Jun 1828 – 30 Apr 1832 Died)
- Félix Torres Amat (20 Jan 1834 – 29 Dec 1847 Died)
- Juan Nepomuceno Cascallana y Ordóñez (7 Jan 1850 – 5 Sep 1851 Confirmed, Bishop of Malaga)
- Benito Forcelledo Tuero (18 Mar 1852 – 23 Jun 1858 Died)
- Fernando Argüelles Miranda (23 Dec 1858 – 2 Sep 1870 Died)
- Mariano Brezmes y Arredondo (17 Sep 1875 – 11 Nov 1885 Died)
- Juan Bautista Grau y Vallespinos (10 Jun 1886 – 18 Sep 1893 Died)
- Vicente Alonso y Salgado, Sch. P. (21 May 1894 – 25 Jun 1903 Appointed Bishop of Cartagena (en España))
- Mariano Cidad y Olmos (25 Jun 1903 – 5 Jul 1903 Died)
- Julián Miranda y Ristuer (12 Nov 1903 – 14 Nov 1904 Appointed Bishop of Segovia)
- Julián de Diego y García Alcolea (14 Nov 1904 – 18 Jul 1913 Appointed Bishop of Salamanca)
- Antonio Senso Lázaro (18 Jul 1913 – 21 Aug 1941 Died)
- Jesús Mérida Pérez (10 Jun 1943 – 16 May 1956 Died)
- José Castelltort Subeyre (5 Nov 1956 – 18 Aug 1960 Died)
- Marcelo González Martín (31 Dec 1960 – 21 Feb 1966 Appointed Coadjutor Archbishop of Barcelona)
- Antonio Briva Mirabent (18 May 1967 – 20 Jun 1994 Died)
- Camilo Lorenzo Iglesias (14 Jun 1995 – 18 Nov 2015 Retired)
- Juan Antonio Menéndez Fernandez (18 Nov 2015 – 15 May 2019 Died)
- Jesús Fernández González (8 Jun 2020 – 27 Mar 2025 Appointed Bishop of Córdoba)

== See also ==
- Roman Catholicism in Spain
- Kingdom of León
- Leonese language
- Roman Catholic Diocese of León in Spain
- Episcopal Palace, Astorga
