= Camilo Lorenzo Iglesias =

Spanish bishop and theologian (1940–2020)

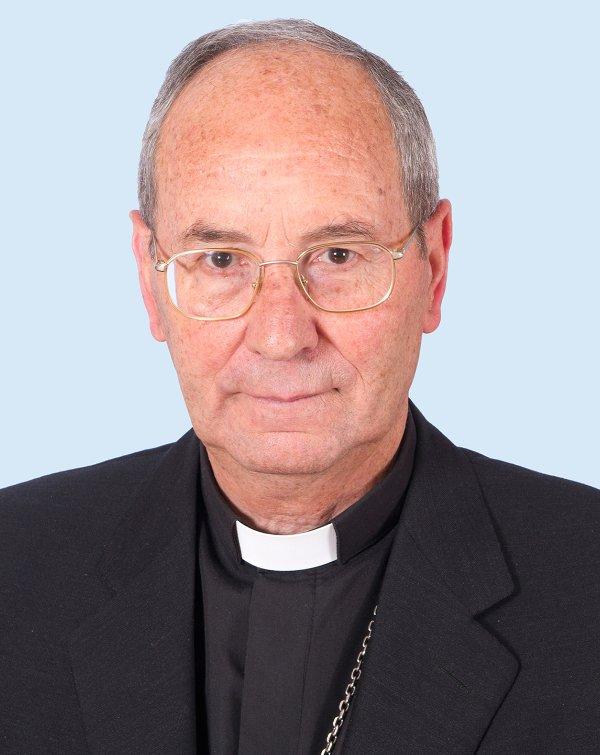
Bishop Camilio Lorenzo Iglesias

Camilio Lorenzo Iglesias (7 August 1940 – 13 July 2020) was a Spanish Catholic bishop.

Lorenzo Iglesias was born in Spain and was ordained to the priesthood in 1966. He served as bishop of the Diocese of Astorga, Spain, from 1995 until 2015.

== Notes ==
Media related to Camilo Lorenzo Iglesias at Wikimedia Commons
