= Diocese of Palencia =

Roman Catholic diocese in Spain

Diocese of Palencia Dioecesis Palentinus Diócesis de Palencia

Catholic
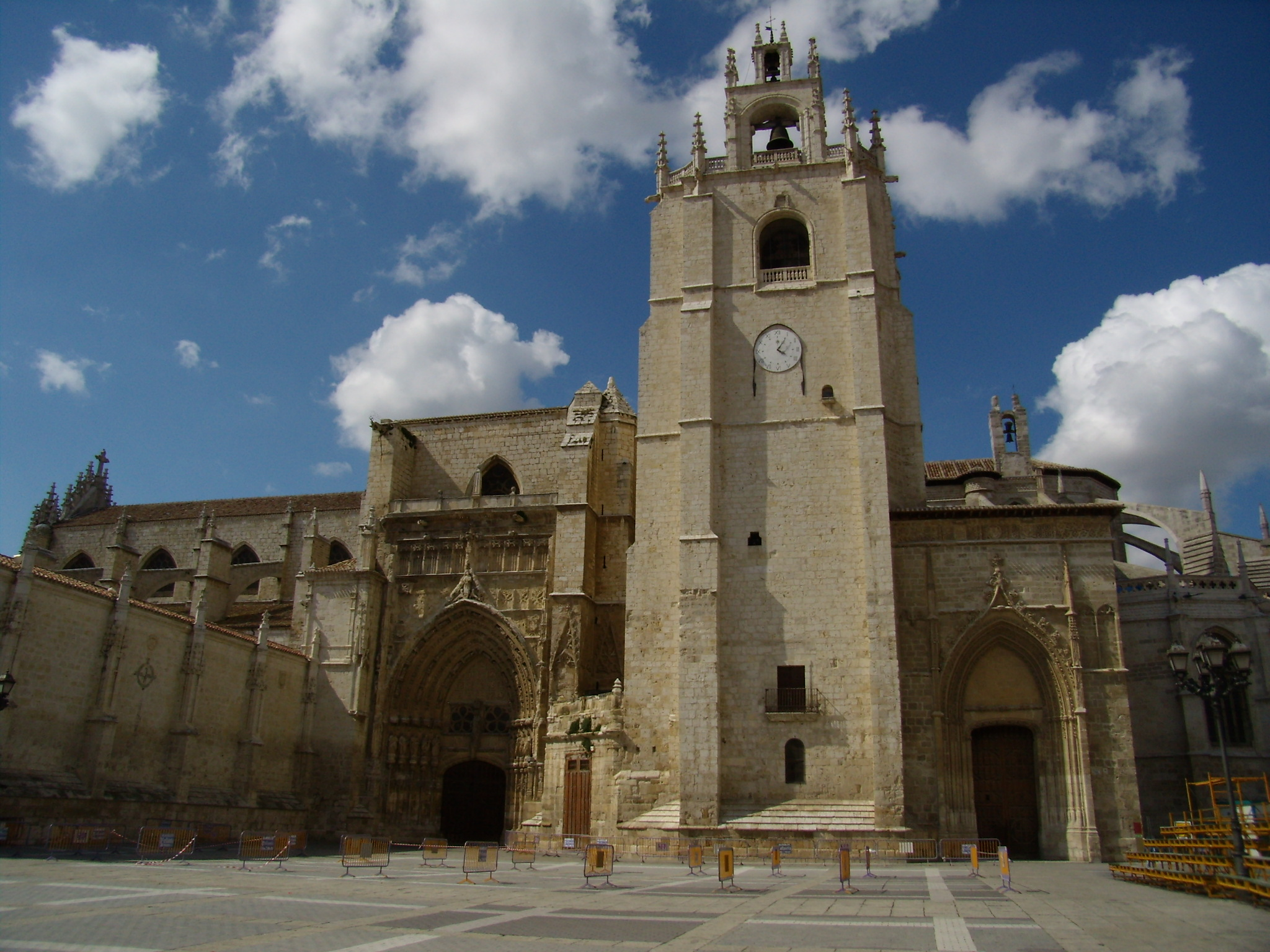
- Palencia Cathedral

Location
- Country: Spain
- Ecclesiastical province: Burgos
- Metropolitan: Burgos
- Coordinates: 42°00′40″N 4°32′13″W

Statistics
- Area: 8,028 km^{2} (3,100 sq mi)
- Population: Total; Catholics: (as of 2004); 177,128; 174,471 (98.5%)

Information
- Rite: Latin Rite
- Established: 3rd Century
- Cathedral: Cathedral of St. John the Baptist in Palencia

Current leadership
- Pope: Leo XIV
- Bishop: Mikel Garciandía Goñi
- Metropolitan Archbishop: Mario Iceta
- Bishops emeritus: Manuel Herrero Fernández

Map
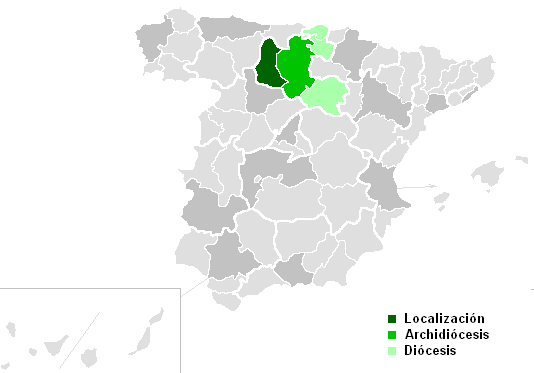

Website
- Website of the Diocese

The Diocese of Palencia (Latin: Dioecesis Palentinsis) is a Latin diocese of the Catholic Church located in the city of Palencia in the ecclesiastical province of Burgos, Spain.

== History ==
The Roman Catholic Diocese of Palencia was established during the 3rd century CE.

== Leadership ==
- Pastor (433–57), possibly legendary
- Peter I (fl. 506)
- Toribius (fl. 527)
- Maurila (586–607)
- Conantius (607–639)
- Ascaric (653–674)
- Concorius (c. 670–688)
- Baroald (fl. 693)

From 711, the see was abandoned until the 940s.

- Julian (940–44)

The see was abandoned again until its definitive reestablishment in 1034.

- Bernard I (1035–40)
- Miro (1040–63)
- Bernard II (1063–85)
- Raymond I (1085–1108)
- Peter of Agen (1109–39)
- Peter II (1139–48)
- Raymond II (1148–83)
- Arderic (1184–1208)
- Adam (1208)
- Tello Téllez de Meneses (1208–46)
- Rodrigo (4 April 1246 – 1254, Died)
- Peter III (1254–1256)
- Ferdinand (1256–1265)
- Alonso García (8 July 1265 – 1270)
- Tello García (1270 – Nov 1274, Died)
- Juan Alfonso de Molina (1278–1293)
- Munio Zamora, O.P. (5 Feb 1294 – 19 Apr 1300, Died)
- Álvaro Carrillo (1297–1306)
- Peter (1306–1307) Pedro
- Gerardo Domínguez (1309–1313)
- Domingo (1313–1314)
- Gómez Peláez (1313–1320)
- Juan Fernández de Limia (1321–1325)
- Pedro de Orfila (1325)
- Juan de Saavedra (1325–1342)
- Peter V (1342–1343)
- Blas (Vasco) Fernández de Toledo (12 Sep 1343 – 17 Jun 1353 Appointed, Archbishop of Toledo)
- Reginald de Maubernard (1353–1356)
- Gutierre I (1357–1370)
- Gutierre Gómez de Luna (1370–1391)
- Juan de Castromocho (1394–1397)
- Peter VI (1397–?), anti-bishop
- Sancho de Rojas (1406–1415)
- Alonso de Argüello (1415–1417)
- Rodrigo de Velasco (1417–1426)
- Gutierre Álvarez de Toledo (1426–1439)
- Pedro Castilla de Eril (6 Apr 1440 – 27 Apr 1461, Died)
- Gutierre de la Cueva (1461–1469)
- Rodrigo Sánchez de Arévalo (1469–1470)
- Diego Hurtado de Mendoza y Quiñones (13 Feb 1470 – 26 Aug 1485 Appointed, Archbishop of Sevilla)
- Alfonso de Burgos, O.P. (1485 – 1499 Died)
- Diego Deza, O.P. (7 Feb 1500 Appointed – 30 Oct 1504 Appointed, Archbishop of Sevilla)
- Juan Rodríguez de Fonseca (1504 – 5 Jul 1514 Appointed, Bishop of Burgos)
- Juan Fernández Velasco (22 Jul 1514 – 1520 Died)
- Pedro Ruiz de la Mota, O.S.B. (4 Jul 1520 – 1522 Died)
- Antonio de Rojas Manrique (1524 – 3 Jul 1525 Appointed, Bishop of Burgos)
- Pedro Gómez Sarmiento de Villandrando (3 Jul 1525 – 8 Jun 1534 Appointed, Archbishop of Santiago de Compostela)
- Francisco Mendoza (18 Jan 1534 – 29 Mar 1536 Died)
- Luis Cabeza de Vaca (14 Apr 1537 – 22 Nov 1550 Died)
- Pedro de la Gasca (6 Apr 1551 – 2 Jun 1561 Appointed, Bishop of Sigüenza)
- Cristóbal Fernández Valtodano (2 Jun 1561 – 20 Feb 1570 Appointed, Archbishop of Santiago de Compostela)
- Juan Ramírez Zapata de Cárdenas (18 Feb 1570 – 1577 Died)
- Alvaro Hurtado de Mendoza y Sarmiento (11 Sep 1577 – 19 Apr 1586 Died)
- Fernando Miguel de Prado (17 Aug 1587 – 5 May 1594 Died)
- Martín Aspi Sierra (28 May 1597 – 1607 Died)
- Felipe Tarsis de Acuña (11 Feb 1608 – 24 Feb 1616 Appointed, Archbishop of Granada)
- José González Díez, O.P. (29 Feb 1616 – 28 Jul 1625 Confirmed, Bishop of Pamplona)
- Miguel Ayala (18 Aug 1625 – 5 May 1628 Confirmed, Bishop of Calahorra y La Calzada)
- Fernando Andrade Sotomayor (29 May 1628 – 10 Nov 1631 Appointed, Bishop of Burgos)
- Cristóbal Guzmán Santoyo (6 Jun 1633 – 17 Nov 1656 Died)
- Antonio de Estrada Manrique (18 Jun 1657 Confirmed – 17 Jun 1658 Died)
- Enrique Peralta y Cárdenas (13 Jan 1659 – 13 Apr 1665 Appointed, Bishop of Burgos)
- Gonzalo Bravo de Grajera (27 Jun 1665 – 28 Sep 1671 Appointed, Bishop of Coria)
- Juan Molino Navarrete, O.F.M. (8 Dec 1672 – 1 Jan 1685 Died)
- Alfonso Lorenzo de Pedraza, O.M. (9 Jul 1685 – 16 Feb 1711 Died)
- Esteban Bellido Guevara (18 Sep 1713 – 1 Jan 1717 Died)
- Francisco Ochoa Mendarozqueta y Arzamendi (12 Jul 1717 – 25 Dec 1732 Died)
- Bartolomé San Martín Orive (2 Dec 1733 – 1740 Died)
- José Morales Blanco (3 Jul 1741 – 29 May 1745 Died)
- José Ignacio Rodríguez Cornejo (15 Dec 1745 – 23 Feb 1750 Appointed, Bishop of Plasencia)
- Andrés Bustamante (16 Mar 1750 – 4 Nov 1764 Died)
- José Cayetano Loazes Somoza (5 Jun 1765 – 17 Oct 1769 Died)
- Juan Manuel Argüelles (12 Mar 1770 – 26 Jun 1779 Died)
- José Luis Mollinedo (18 Sep 1780 – 6 Nov 1800 Died)
- Buenaventura Moyano Rodríguez (23 Feb 1801 – 7 Sep 1802 Died)
- Francisco Javier Almonacid (16 May 1803 – 13 Sep 1821 Died)
- Narciso Coll y Prat (25 Feb 1822 – 30 Dec 1822 Died)
- Juan Francisco Martínez y Castrillón (27 Sep 1824 – 23 Jun 1828 Confirmed, Bishop of Málaga)
- José Asensio Ocón y Toledo (15 Dec 1828 – 24 Feb 1832 Confirmed, Bishop of Teruel)
- Carlos Laborda Clau (26 Nov 1831 – 11 Feb 1853 Died)
- Jerónimo Fernández y Andrés (22 Dec 1853 – 23 Mar 1865 Died)
- Juan Lozano Torreira (8 Jan 1866 – 4 Jul 1891 Died)
- Enrique Almaraz y Santos (19 Jan 1893 – 18 Apr 1907 Appointed, Archbishop of Sevilla)
- Valentín García y Barros (18 Apr 1907 – 10 Dec 1914 Died)
- Ramón Barberá y Boada (28 May 1914 – 11 Sep 1924 Died)
- Agustín Parrado y García (20 May 1925 – 4 Apr 1934 Appointed, Archbishop of Granada)
- St. Manuel González y García (5 Aug 1935 – 4 Jan 1940 Died)
- Francisco Javer Lauzurica y Torralba (10 Jun 1943 Appointed – 8 Apr 1949 Appointed, Bishop of Oviedo)
- José Souto Vizoso (11 Jul 1949 – 31 Mar 1970 Retired)
- Anastasio Granados García (31 Mar 1970 – 13 Feb 1978 Died)
- Nicolás Antonio Castellanos Franco, O.S.A. (27 Jul 1978 – 4 Sep 1991 Resigned)
- Ricardo Blázquez Pérez (26 May 1992 Appointed – 8 Sep 1995 Appointed, Bishop of Bilbao)
- Rafael Palmero Ramos (9 Jan 1996 – 26 Nov 2005 Appointed, Bishop of Orihuela–Alicante)
- José Ignacio Munilla Aguirre (24 Jun 2006 – 21 Nov 2009 Appointed, Bishop of San Sebastián)
- Esteban Escudero Torres (9 Jul 2010 – 7 May 2015 Appointed, Auxiliary Bishop of Valencia)
- Manuel Herrero Fernández, O.S.A. (26 Apr 2016 – present)

== See also ==
- Roman Catholicism in Spain
