= Pedro Sarmiento (cardinal) =

Spanish Roman Catholic bishop and cardinal

Pedro Sarmiento (c. 1478–1541) was a Spanish Roman Catholic bishop and cardinal.

== Biography ==
Pedro Sarmiento was born in Ribadeo, on the north-west coast of Spain, ca. 1478, the son of Pedro Ruiz de Sarmiento, 1st count of Salinas, and María de Villandrado, señora of Ribadeo. He studied civil law and canon law at the University of Salamanca and the University of Valladolid.

He became a canon of the cathedral chapter of the Cathedral of Santiago de Compostela in 1496. He also became a canon of the chapter of the cathedral at Tui, Pontevedra. He was the last abbot of the monastery of Santa Marta in Astorga. He took orders as a deacon and was a perpetual beneficiary of the parish church of Fuentes de Duero.

He went on to serve as a chaplain to the Catholic Monarchs. Under Charles I of Spain, he was made the king's almoner and sacristan major of his chapel.

On March 4, 1523, he was elected bishop of Tui, though he never visited the diocese, governing through officers. On October 26, 1524, he was transferred to the see of Badajoz, and then on July 3, 1525 to the see of Palencia, taking possession of that diocese on August 18, 1527.

He was a witness at the signing of the Treaty of Madrid (1526) which freed Francis I of France. He accompanied Charles I of Spain, who was now Charles V, Holy Roman Emperor, in the emperor's trips to Flanders, Italy, and Germany. He was present at the imperial coronation in Bologna on February 24, 1530.

On June 8, 1534, he was promoted to the metropolitan see of Santiago de Compostela, taking possession of the archdiocese on June 10, 1536.

He accompanied the emperor to Italy again in 1538.

At the request of the emperor and the emperor's daughter Margaret of Parma (who married Pope Paul III's grandson Ottavio Farnese, Duke of Parma on November 4, 1538), the pope created Sarmiento a cardinal priest in the consistory of October 18, 1538. He received the red hat and the titular church of Santi Apostoli on November 15, 1538.

On January 28, 1541, he became the administrator of the see of Anagni, though he quickly resigned that administration on April 6, 1541.

He died in Lucca on October 13, 1541. He was initially buried in the Dominican monastery in Anagni. His relative Juan Sarmiento, abbot of Benevivere in Palencia, later had his remains transferred to the abbey of Benevivere.
