= Gustav Bergenroth =

German historian (1813–1869)

Gustav Adolf Bergenroth
- Born: February 26, 1813; Oletzko, East Prussia
- Died: February 13, 1869 (aged 55); Madrid
- Education: University of Königsberg
- Occupations: Historian, civil servant, cryptographer
- Writing career
- Years active: 1848–1869
- Subjects: Tudor England, Spanish-English relations

Gustav Adolf Bergenroth (26 February 1813 – 13 February 1869) was a German historian.

== Life ==
He was born at Oletzko, in East Prussia, on 26 February 1813. From his father, the magistrate of the town, a stubborn and incorruptible patriot, he received an education well calculated to develop the independence of mind and strength of body for which he was remarkable all his life. After a somewhat stormy career at the university of Königsberg, he successively obtained several minor situations in the magistracy, and devoted himself to the study of statistics and political economy. His inquiries, combined with the restless temper which always made official life distasteful to him, led him to adopt advanced democratic opinions, which, freely manifested during the Revolutions of 1848, cost him his post in the civil service upon the triumph of the reaction.

After assisting in Gottfried Kinkel's remarkable escape from Spandau Prison, be determined to emigrate to California, whither he proceeded in 1850. The incidents of his voyage and residence were most adventurous. He caught yellow fever on the passage out, was robbed, while unconscious, of all his property, arrived at San Francisco half dead, and owed his life to the charity of a woman. Having also recovered from an attack of cholera, he betook himself to the wilderness, and lived for some time the life of a hunter. He saw much of the operations of the vigilance committee, which he subsequently vividly described in Household Words.

In 1851, he returned to Europe, and for several years led a peripatetic life, seeking employment alternately as a tutor and as a man of letters. In 1857, he formed the resolution of devoting himself to English history, and settled in London with the view of studying the period of the Tudors. Finding the materials in the English Record Office insufficient, he conceived the bold plan of establishing himself at Simancas, and making a thorough examination of the Archivo General de Simancas, at that time exceedingly difficult of access. Before Bergenroth no more than six students, Spanish and foreign, had made any important research in the archives, and it was generally believed that great havoc had been committed among them by the French soldiers, which Bergenroth found reason to doubt. The history of his investigations is most graphically narrated by himself in letters to the Athenæum, and in private communications to Sir John Romilly, master of the rolls, who was induced by the Athenæum letters to procure Bergenroth a commission with a stipend from the English government.

He speedily manifested the most remarkable talent as a decipherer, interpreting more than twelve ciphers of exceeding difficulty, with which the Spanish archivists were themselves unacquainted, or the keys to which they withheld from him. Their persistent obstruction compelled him to have recourse to the English embassy at Madrid; but his energy triumphed over every obstacle, and in 1862 he was enabled to publish a calendar of the documents in the Simancas Archives relating to English affairs from 1485 to 1509, with additions from the repositories at Brussels, Barcelona, and other places. This calendar was introduced by a fascinating preface, describing his difficulties and successes as a decipherer, and including a brilliant review of the relations between England and Spain during the period.

Bergenroth was elected a member of the American Antiquarian Society in 1867.

A second and larger volume appeared in 1868, analysing the documents from 1509 to 1525. While labouring indefatigably at the Simancas records, he was attacked by an epidemic fever, of which he died at Madrid on 13 February 1869.

He examined in Simancas, in Spain, under great privations, papers on the period in the public archives, made of these a collection and published it in 1862-1868, under the title of Calendar of Letters, Despatches, &c., relating to Negotiations between England and Spain.

- Bergenroth bio (in German)

== Works ==
- Calendar of Letters, Despatches, and State Papers relating to the Negotiations between England and Spain, preserved in the archives at Simancas and elsewhere. London. 1862 – via HathiTrust.
- Calendar of Letters, Despatches, and State Papers, relating to the Negotiations between England and Spain, preserved in the archives at Simancas and elsewhere. Vol.I. Henry VII 1485-1509. London. 1862 – via archive.org.
- Supplement to Volume I. and Volume II. of Letters, Despatches, and State Papers, relating to the Negotiations between England and Spain, preserved in the archives at Simancas and elsewhere. I. Queen Katherine. II. Intended Marriage of King Henry VII. with Queen Juana. London. 1868 – via archive.org.
