= Ayton Parish Church =

Church in Ayton, Scottish Borders, Scotland

Coordinates: 55.8410°N 2.1177°W

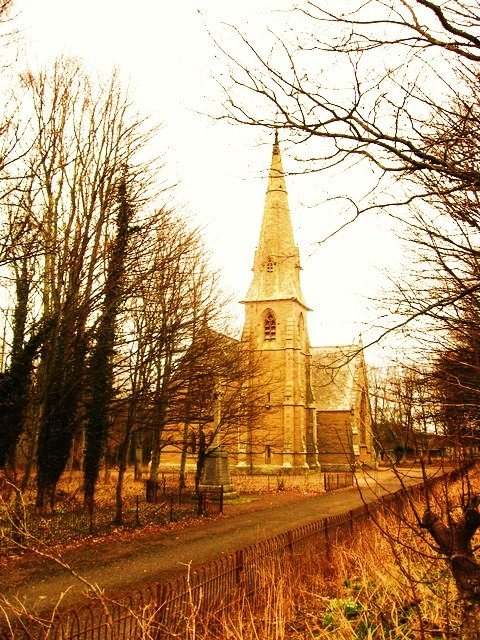
Ayton Parish Church

Ayton and Burnmouth Parish Church is a member church (Scots: kirk) of the Church of Scotland, serving the communities of Ayton and Burnmouth in the Scottish Borders. The church is situated on the side of the B6355 road, just off the main A1 road, 0.5 miles (0.80 km) south of the village centre and 6.5 miles (10.5 km) north-west of Berwick upon Tweed, at grid reference NT927609.

== History ==
There are charters of the late 11th and early 12th centuries granting the lands of Eiton, as Ayton was then known, to Coldingham Priory. The lands were granted by King Edgar of Scotland (ruled 1097–1107). By the end of the 12th century, the monks of Coldingham had built a chapel dedicated St. Dionysius. The church later received an altar dedicated to the Virgin Mary, with endowments of various acres and rigs in the Lordship of Ayton.

The old chapel, which had been extensively altered and renewed over the years up to the 18th century was, originally, a simple rectangular building, but changed to a T shape with the addition of the north aisle. Many of the early Norman features were altered or even removed in the 17th and 18th centuries.

The Chapel of St. Dionysius was an important place in medieval Scotland, it played host to several meetings of commissioners from Scotland and England, in their efforts to come to treaty, including those in 1380, 1384 and 1497. The meeting of 1497 involved the Spanish diplomat Pedro de Ayala on behalf of James IV of Scotland with representatives of Henry VII of England, and the outcome was a seven-year truce. St. Dionysius' Church continued as a Roman Catholic place of worship in the hands of the monks of Coldingham until the Scottish Reformation, when it became part of the reformed church.

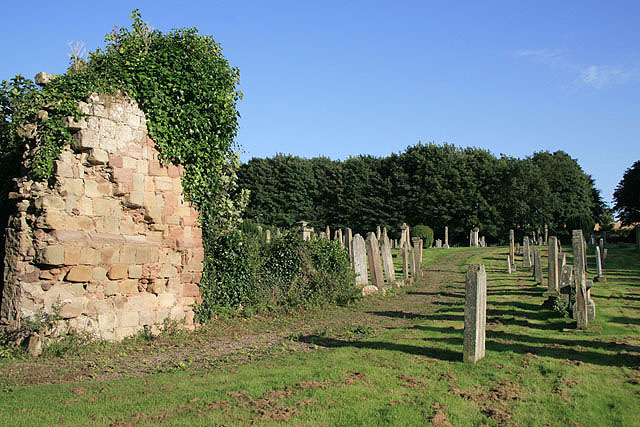
The kirkyard and part of the ruined St. Dionysius' Church

== Post-Reformation ==
The old church buildings continued with several alterations and renovations (see above) until it no longer was fit for purpose. In 1864, a new church was built just outside the village, adjacent to the ancient church. The church was built by eminent 19th century architect James Maitland Wardrop, in the "First Pointed" style of Gothic architecture, and is a near T-shape with a 3-stage square-plan tower. The 19th-century Ayton Parish Church is a category A listed building, the highest level of protection for a historic building in Scotland, while the ruined St. Dionysius' Church is listed at category B.

== List of Post-Reformation ministers ==
- 1574 John Kent
- 1604 William Hog
- 1653 William Home
- 1667 John Bethune
- 1712 Thomas Anderson
