= Diego Salcedo (bishop) =

Diego Salcedo Benacos (May 30, 1575 – April 2, 1644) was a Spanish bishop. He became Roman Catholic bishop of Astorga in 1639, and died in 1644.

== External links and additional sources ==
- Cheney, David M. "Diocese of Astorga". Catholic-Hierarchy.org. (for Chronology of Bishops) ^{[self-published]}
- Chow, Gabriel. "Diocese of Astorga (Spain)". GCatholic.org. (for Chronology of Bishops) ^{[self-published]}
