= List of cathedrals in Spain =

Location of cathedrals in continental Spain, Ceuta and the Balearic Islands. Bold indicates the seat of an Archidiocese.
The two cathedrals in the Canary Islands.

This list presents the cathedrals in Spain, as formally recognised by the Spanish Episcopal Conference. It comprises all 87 active cathedrals and co-cathedrals in the country. All of these institutions are Roman Catholic; cathedrals belonging to other Christian denominations are noted separately below, as are former Roman Catholic cathedrals.

A cathedral is the principal church of a Christian diocese and is distinguished by housing the cathedra, or bishop’s seat, which symbolises episcopal authority. Owing to the strict definitional criteria applied here, several of Spain’s most architecturally or culturally prominent churches fall outside the scope of this list. Examples include Barcelona’s Basilica of the Sagrada Família and Santa María del Mar; the Basilica of Covadonga; the Poblet Abbey; the Hermitage of El Rocío; and the monasteries of El Escorial and Guadalupe.

Christianity was introduced to the Iberian Peninsula during the Roman period, and some of the earliest cathedrals were later constructed under the Visigothic Kingdom. Only minimal remains of these structures survive today, largely as foundational elements beneath present‑day cathedrals such as those in Barcelona and Palencia. After the progressive Reconquista of Islamic Al-Andalus, new cathedrals were erected atop former mosques in the Romanesque style. Notable examples from this era include the cathedrals of Santiago de Compostela, Zamora, and the Old Cathedral of Salamanca. Concurrently, the Mudéjar style also emerged in Castile, a synthesis of Islamic and Christian architectural traditions that extended into Aragón. Its most celebrated expression is found in the Teruel Cathedral. The spread of Gothic architecture, from France along the pilgrimage route of the Way of Saint James, exerted substantial influence on ecclesiastical construction in northern Spain, such as those of Burgos and León. As territories further south were reclaimed, Gothic principles were quickly adopted for new cathedrals, including those of Toledo and Seville—the latter being the largest Gothic church in the world. A distinctive local Gothic tradition endured in Spain longer than in many other European regions, with major works such as Segovia Cathedral and the New Cathedral of Salamanca continuing well into the 16th century.

Although Renaissance architecture initially met resistance for being perceived as foreign or outdated, it eventually gained acceptance and was employed in the construction of significant buildings such as Granada Cathedral, erected on the site of the last Islamic stronghold in Spain. By the 17th century, wealth acquired from the Americas enabled the flourishing of elaborate Baroque architecture, exemplified by the redesigned façade of Santiago de Compostela Cathedral and the Cathedral-Basilica of Our Lady of the Pillar in Zaragoza. Later developments in post‑Gothic styles saw Spanish cathedrals move away from the conventional Latin‑cross floor plan towards more open designs. A small number of cathedrals also incorporate modern architectural elements; Madrid’s Almudena Cathedral, not completed until 1993, is an eclectic synthesis of several reinterpretations of historical styles.

Today, Spanish cathedrals function not only as centres of religious life but also as significant cultural and architectural landmarks. They attract millions of visitors each year, playing a vital role in national tourism. Santiago de Compostela Cathedral—an important pilgrimage destination for centuries—received a record 2.6 million visitors in 2017. Twenty‑four Spanish cathedrals have been designated UNESCO World Heritage Sites, either individually, as in the case of Burgos, or as components of larger historic areas, such as the old towns of San Cristóbal de La Laguna or Ibiza. With the exception of two, all are protected as national cultural monuments. (Note: The two excluded ones are the Sant Feliu de Llobregat and Terrassa cathedrals, both located near Barcelona.)

== List of Roman Catholic Cathedrals ==
Bold indicates seat of an archdiocese.

Indicates a UNESCO World Heritage Site.

| Name | Location | Autonomous Community | Diocese | Dedication (Note: Year of dedication as a cathedral. This may not reflect the actual age or completion of the building, which can be several centuries older. The latest dedication year known for the current building is used. In some cases, older cathedrals where functioning on the same site, but those buildings were demolished, destroyed or replaced.) | Notes | Images |
|---|---|---|---|---|---|---|
| Cathedral of Saint John the Baptist | Albacete | Castile-La Mancha | Albacete | 1955 | | |
| Cathedral of the Saviour | Albarracín | Aragon | Teruel and Albarracín | 1600 | | |
| Magistral Cathedral of Saint Justus and Saint Pastor | Alcalá de Henares | Madrid | Alcalá de Henares | 1991 | UNESCO World Heritage Site since 1998, as part of the site University and Historic Precinct of Alcalá de Henares. Only church together with Saint Peter's of Leuven to have the rank of Magistral, as their canons are required to be doctors in Theology. | |
| Co-Cathedral of Saint Nicholas of Bari | Alicante | Valencian Community | Orihuela-Alicante | 1959 | | |
| Cathedral of the Incarnation | Almería | Andalusia | Almería | 1551 | | |
| Cathedral of Saint Mary | Astorga | Castile and León | Astorga | 1069 | | |
| Cathedral of the Saviour | Ávila | Castile and León | Ávila | | UNESCO World Heritage Site since 1985 as part of the site Old Town of Ávila with its Extra-Muros Churches. | |
| **Metropolitan Cathedral of Saint John the Baptist** | Badajoz | Extremadura | Mérida-Badajoz | 1276 | | |
| Cathedral of Saint Mary of the Assumption | Barbastro | Aragon | Barbastro-Monzón | 1571 | | |
| **Metropolitan Cathedral Basilica of the Holy Cross and Saint Eulalia** | Barcelona | Catalonia | Barcelona | 1058 (Note: Consecretion of the Romanesque cathedral. The latter, Gothic building was never formally consecrated, as it was considered a "significant extension" but not a new cathedral.) | | |
| Cathedral Basilica of Saint James | Bilbao | Basque Country | Bilbao | 1955 | UNESCO World Heritage Site since 2015, as part of the site Routes of Santiago de Compostela: Camino Francés and Routes of Northern Spain. | |
| **Metropolitan Cathedral Basilica of Saint Mary** | Burgos | Castile and León | Burgos | 1260 | UNESCO World Heritage Site since 1984, Spain's first declared WHS. | |
| Co-Cathedral of Saint Mary | Cáceres | Extremadura | Coria-Cáceres | 1957 | UNESCO World Heritage Site since 1986, as part of the site Old Town of Cáceres. | |
| Cathedral of the Holy Cross over the Waters | Cádiz | Andalusia | Cádiz and Ceuta | 1838 | | |
| Cathedral of Saint Mary | Calahorra | La Rioja | Calahorra and La Calzada-Logroño | | | |
| Co-Cathedral of Saint Mary | Castellón de la Plana | Valencian Community | Segorbe-Castellón | 1961 | | |
| Cathedral of the Assumption | Ceuta | Ceuta | Cádiz and Ceuta | 1726 | | |
| Cathedral Basilica of Saint Mary of the Prado | Ciudad Real | Castile-La Mancha | Ciudad Real | 1981 | Since 1875 it holds the title of priory of the military orders of Santiago, Alcántara, Calatrava and Montesa. | |
| Cathedral of Saint Mary | Ciudad Rodrigo | Castile and Leon | Ciudad Rodrigo | 1160 | | |
| Cathedral Basilica of Saint Mary | Ciutadella | Balearic Islands | Menorca | 1795 | | |
| Cathedral of the Assumption of our Lady | Córdoba | Andalusia | Córdoba | 1236 | UNESCO World Heritage Site since 1984, and extended in 1994 to create the site Historic Centre of Cordoba. Better known as the Mosque-Cathedral of Córdoba. | |
| Cathedral of Saint Mary of the Assumption | Coria | Extremadura | Coria-Cáceres | 1898 | | |
| Cathedral of Saint Mary and Saint Julian | Cuenca | Castile-La Mancha | Cuenca | 1196 | UNESCO World Heritage Site since 1996 as part of the site Historic Walled Town of Cuenca. It is considered the first gothic cathedral in Spain. | |
| Cathedral of the Assumption of Mary | El Burgo de Osma | Castile and Leon | Osma-Soria | 1272 | | |
| Co-Cathedral of Saint Julian | Ferrol | Galicia | Mondoñedo-Ferrol | 1959 | | |
| Cathedral of Saint Mary Magdalene | Getafe | Madrid | Getafe | 1995 | | |
| Cathedral of Saint Mary | Girona | Catalonia | Girona | 1038 | Widest gothic nave in the world at 23 m. | |
| **Metropolitan Cathedral Basilica of the Incarnation** | Granada | Andalusia | Granada | 1946 (Note: Even though the Cathedral has been active since 1561, it was formally consecrated in 1946 as it was suspected that it has never been so.) | Burial place of the Catholic Monarchs. | |
| Co-Cathedral of Saint Mary the Major | Guadalajara | Castile-La Mancha | Sigüenza-Guadalajara | 1959 | | |
| Cathedral of the Incarnation | Guadix | Andalusia | Guadix | | Guadix is traditionally considered the oldest episcopal see in Spain, founded by Saint Torquatus in the 1st century AD. | |
| Cathedral of Our Lady of Mercy | Huelva | Andalusia | Huelva | 1954 | | |
| Cathedral of the Transfiguration of the Lord | Huesca | Aragon | Huesca | 1098 | | |
| Cathedral of Our Lady of the Snows | Ibiza | Balearic Islands | Ibiza | 1817 | UNESCO World Heritage Site since 1999 as part of the site Ibiza, Biodiversity and Culture. | |
| Cathedral of Saint Peter | Jaca | Aragon | Jaca | 1063 | | |
| Cathedral of the Assumption | Jaen | Andalusia | Jaén | 1660 | | |
| Cathedral of the Holy Saviour | Jerez de la Frontera | Andalusia | Asidonia-Jerez | 1980 | | |
| Cathedral of Saint Mary | La Seu d'Urgell | Catalonia | Urgell | 1040 (Note: Consecretion year of the third of the four cathedrals that were erected here. The current building, started in 1116 by Bishop Ot remains in many aspects, unfinished.) | The town itself incorporated the cathedral to its name, being seo an alternate Latin name for cathedral church. Its bishop is one of the co-Princes of Andorra, ruling since 988. | |
| Cathedral Basilica of Saint Anne | Las Palmas | Canary Islands | Canarias | 1871 | | |
| Cathedral of Saint Mary | León | Castile and Leon | León | 1303 | | |
| Cathedral of the Assumption | Lleida | Catalonia | Lleida | 1781 | Commonly known as the New Cathedral of Lleida. | |
| Co-Cathedral of Saint Mary of La Redonda | Logroño | La Rioja | Calahorra and La Calzada-Logroño | 1959 | | |
| Cathedral of the Assumption of Saint Mary | Lugo | Galicia | Lugo | 1273 | UNESCO World Heritage Site since 2015, as part of the site Routes of Santiago de Compostela: Camino Francés and Routes of Northern Spain. | |
| **Metropolitan Cathedral of Saint Mary the Royal of La Almudena** | Madrid | Madrid | Madrid | 1993 | Only cathedral in Spain and first one outside Rome to be consecrated by a pope. | |
| Cathedral of the Armed Forces | Madrid | Madrid | Military Archbishopric of Spain | 1985 | | |
| Cathedral Basilica of the Incarnation | Málaga | Andalusia | Málaga | 1588 | | |
| **Metropolitan Co-Cathedral of Saint Mary the Major** | Mérida | Extremadura | Mérida-Badajoz | 2006 (Note: Formally consecrated in 2006, after lack of evidence that it was done so in 1994, after it was elevated co-cathedral of the archdiocese.) | | |
| Cathedral Basilica of the Virgin of the Assumption | Mondoñedo | Galicia | Mondoñedo-Ferrol | 1246 | UNESCO World Heritage Site since 2015, as part of the site Routes of Santiago de Compostela: Camino Francés and Routes of Northern Spain. | |
| Co-Cathedral of Saint Mary of the Romeral | Monzón | Aragon | Barbastro-Monzón | 1998 | | |
| Cathedral of Saint Mary | Murcia | Murcia | Cartagena | 1467 | | |
| Cathedral of the Saviour and Saint Mary | Orihuela | Valencian Community | Orihuela-Alicante | 1510 | | |
| Cathedral of Saint Martin | Ourense | Galicia | Ourense | 1188 | | |
| **Metropolitan Cathedral Basilica of the Holy Saviour** | Oviedo | Asturias | Oviedo | 821 | UNESCO World Heritage Site since 2015, as part of the site Routes of Santiago de Compostela: Camino Francés and Routes of Northern Spain. Its Cámara Santa (Holy Chamber) was previously designated in 1998, as part of site Monuments of Oviedo and the Kingdom of the Asturias. | |
| Cathedral Basilica of Saint Antoninus | Palencia | Castile and Leon | Palencia | 1897 (Note: Formally consecrated in 1897 after lack of evidence that it was done before.) | Third largest in total area in Spain. | |
| Cathedral Basilica of Saint Mary | Palma | Balearic Islands | Mallorca | 1346 | Its gothic rose window is the largest in the world, at 13 m. | |
| **Metropolitan Cathedral of Saint Mary of the Assumption** | Pamplona | Navarre | Pamplona and Tudela | 1127 | | |
| Cathedral of the Assumption of our Lady | Plasencia | Extremadura | Plasencia | 1578 | A complex of two cathedrals, an old and a new one, both unfinished and adjacent to each other. | |
| Cathedral of Saint Mary of the See | Salamanca | Castile and Leon | Salamanca | | UNESCO World Heritage Site since 1988 as part of the site Old City of Salamanca. Better known as the Old Cathedral. | |
| Cathedral of the Assumption of the Virgin | Salamanca | Castile and Leon | Salamanca | 1733 | UNESCO World Heritage Site since 1988 as part of the site Old City of Salamanca. Better known as the New Cathedral. | |
| Cathedral of Our Lady of Los Remedios | San Cristóbal de La Laguna | Canary Islands | San Cristóbal de La Laguna | 1819 | UNESCO World Heritage Site since 1999 as part of the site San Cristóbal de La Laguna. | |
| Cathedral of the Good Shepherd | San Sebastián | Basque Country | San Sebastián | 1953 | | |
| Cathedral of Saint Lawrence | Sant Feliu de Llobregat | Catalonia | Sant Feliu de Llobregat | 2004 | | |
| Cathedral Basilica of Our Lady of the Assumption | Santander | Cantabria | Santander | 1754 | | |
| **Metropolitan Cathedral Basilica of Saint James the Apostle** | Santiago de Compostela | Galicia | Santiago de Compostela | 1211 | UNESCO World Heritage Site since 1985, as part of the site Santiago de Compostela (Old Town). Traditionally regarded as the burial place of the apostle James the Great, and the subject of pilgrimage for centuries. Depicted on Spanish 1, 2 and 5 Euro cent coins. | |
| Cathedral of the Saviour and Saint Mary | Santo Domingo de la Calzada | La Rioja | Calahorra and La Calzada-Logroño | 1232 | | |
| Cathedral Basilica of the Assumption of Our Lady | Segorbe | Valencian Community | Segorbe-Castellón | 1534 | The interior was fully renovated between 1791 and 1795, becoming the only cathedral in the Academic style in Spain. | |
| Cathedral of Our Lady of the Assumption and of Saint Fructus | Segovia | Castile and Leon | Segovia | 1768 | UNESCO World Heritage Site since 1985 as part of the site Old Town of Segovia and its Aqueduct. | |
| **Metropolitan Cathedral of Saint Mary of the See** | Seville | Andalusia | Seville | 1507 | UNESCO World Heritage Site since 1987, as part of the site Cathedral, Alcázar and Archivo de Indias in Seville. Largest gothic cathedral in the world. | |
| Cathedral Basilica of Saint Mary | Sigüenza | Castile-La Mancha | Sigüenza-Guadalajara | 1169 | | |
| Cathedral of Saint Mary | Solsona | Catalonia | Solsona | 1593 | | |
| Co-Cathedral of Saint Peter | Soria | Castile and Leon | Osma-Soria | 1959 | Stills keep the older, Romanesque, cloister from the 12th century from a previous church that fell down around 1543. It was replaced with the current, Gothic building. | |
| Cathedral of Saint Mary of La Huerta | Tarazona | Aragon | Tarazona | 1235 | Reopened in 2011 after a 30-year renovation that rediscovered a set of al fresco paintings from the 1540s showing nude mythological creatures, a unique feature for a cathedral in Europe. | |
| **Primatial Metropolitan Cathedral Basilica of Saint Thecla** | Tarragona | Catalonia | Tarragona | 1331 | | |
| Cathedral of the Holy Spirit | Terrassa | Catalonia | Terrassa | 2004 | | |
| Cathedral of Saint Mary of Mediavilla | Teruel | Aragon | Teruel and Albarracín | 1587 | UNESCO World Heritage Site since 1986 as part of the site Mudéjar architecture of Aragon (specifically its bell tower, lantern tower, and wooden ceiling). | |
| **Primatial Metropolitan Cathedral of Saint Mary of the Assumption** | Toledo | Castile-La Mancha | Toledo | 1493 | UNESCO World Heritage Site since 1986 as part of the site Historic City of Toledo. Since 1088, it holds the honorific title of Primatial, granted by Urban II, establishing a higher rank over the rest in the Iberian Peninsula. | |
| Cathedral Basilica of Saint Mary | Tortosa | Catalonia | Tortosa | 1441 | | |
| **Cathedral of Saint Mary the Major** | Tudela | Navarre | Pamplona and Tudela | 1782 | | |
| Cathedral of Saint Mary of the Assumption | Tui | Galicia | Tui-Vigo | 1225 | | |
| **Metropolitan Cathedral Basilica of the Assumption of our Lady** | Valencia | Valencian Community | Valencia | 1238 | Claims to house the Holy Grail since 1437. | |
| **Metropolitan Cathedral of our Lady of the Assumption** | Valladolid | Castile and Leon | Valladolid | 1668 | Originally projected to be the largest cathedral in Christendom, it was left unfinished when less than half of the building was built. | |
| Cathedral Basilica of Saint Peter | Vic | Catalonia | Vic | 1803 | | |
| Co-Cathedral Basilica of Saint Mary | Vigo | Galicia | Tui-Vigo | 1959 | | |
| Cathedral of Saint Mary | Vitoria-Gasteiz | Basque Country | Vitoria | 1863 | UNESCO World Heritage Site in 2015, as part of the Routes of Santiago de Compostela: Camino Francés and Routes of Northern Spain. Commonly known as the "Old cathedral". | |
| Cathedral of Mary Immaculate | Vitoria-Gasteiz | Basque Country | Vitoria | 1969 | Commonly known as the "New cathedral". Second largest cathedral in Spain, by area, after Seville. | |
| Cathedral of the Saviour | Zamora | Castile and Leon | Zamora | 1174 | | |
| **Metropolitan Cathedral of the Saviour** | Zaragoza | Aragon | Zaragoza | 1318 | UNESCO World Heritage Site since 2001 as part of the extension of the site Mudéjar architecture of Aragon. | |
| **Cathedral Basilica of Our Lady of the Pillar** | Zaragoza | Aragon | Zaragoza | 1676 | With an estimated 5 million visitors in 2015, it's one of the most visited monuments in Spain. | |

=== Former Roman Catholic Cathedrals ===
This list includes notable historical buildings that held the see of the bishop until it was moved, merged or suppressed. Buildings that once have held the see of current titular sees are not included.

| Name | Location | Autonomous Community | Diocese | Dedication | Notes | Images |
|---|---|---|---|---|---|---|
| Cathedral of the Nativity of our Lady | Baeza | Andalusia | Jaén | 1227 | UNESCO World Heritage Site since 2003, as part of the site Renaissance Monumental Ensembles of Úbeda and Baeza. Was the seat of the cathedra between 1227 and 1249, when it was moved to Jaén. | |
| Church of the Assumption of Our Lady | Baza | Andalusia | Guadix | | Held the rank of Co-Cathedral until the Concordat of 1851. | |
| Church of the Holy Cross | Cádiz | Andalusia | Cádiz and Ceuta | 1602 | Also known as the Old Cathedral of Cádiz. Seat of the diocese between 1602 and 1838. | |
| Cathedral of Saint Mary | Cartagena | Murcia | Cartagena | 1250 | Held the seat of the diocese until 1289, when it was moved to Murcia. Heavily bombed during the Spanish Civil War, it lays in ruins since 1936. In 1988, a Roman theatre was discovered under it. | |
| Old Cathedral of Lleida | Lleida | Catalonia | Lleida | 1278 | In 1707, during the War of the Spanish Succession, king Philip V of Spain took the city and later ordered the destruction of the cathedral. The order never took place, but the cathedral was transformed into barracks and it never had a religious use since then. | |
| Collegiate of Saint Isidore the Royal | Madrid | Madrid | Madrid | 1885 | Pro-cathedral of Madrid between 1885, date of creation of the diocese, and 1993. | |
| Cathedral of Saint Vincent Martyr | Roda de Isábena | Aragon | Barbastro-Monzón | 1030 | Held the seat until 1149, when it moved to the recently conquered Lleida. Regarded as the oldest Cathedral in Aragón. The town, with approximately 60 inhabitants in 2016, is the smallest one in Spain to have a cathedral building. | |

== Anglican ==
The Cathedral of the Spanish Reformed Episcopal Church:

- Anglican Cathedral of the Redeemer in Madrid

== Eastern Orthodox ==
Cathedrals of the Ecumenical Patriarchate of Constantinople:

- Cathedral of Apostle Andrew and Saint Dimitrios in Madrid

Cathedrals of the Romanian Orthodox Church:

- Romanian Orthodox Cathedral of Madrid, since 2017.

Cathedrals of the Russian Orthodox Church

- Cathedral of Saint Mary Magdalene in Madrid

== See also ==
- Catholic Church in Spain
- Lists of cathedrals by country
- List of the Roman Catholic dioceses of Spain
