= Ramón González Barrón =

Spanish composer and conductor (1897–1987)

Ramón González Barrón (August 12, 1897, Villanueva del Campo – July 30, 1987, Villanueva del Campo) was a Spanish composer and choral conductor. He was educated at the Seminario Redemptoris Mater in León, Spain and the Universidad Eclesiástica de Santiago where he graduated with a degree in theology in 1923. He Later studied music composition in Madrid with Emilio Vega. In 1921 he was appointed choirmaster at the Mondoñedo Cathedral. He remained there until 1926 when he was appointed choir master at the Astorga Cathedral. He remained in that position for twenty years, leaving that role in 1946 when he was appointed choir master at the Almudena Cathedral in Madrid.

In 1959 González Barrón founded the Agrupación Coral Nuestra Señora de la Almudena; an organization through which he gave many professional choral concerts. He was a principal organizer of the Congreso Nacional de Música Sagrada in Madrid in 1954. He wrote several articles which were published in Spanish-language music journals. His compositional output includes seven masses, four in Latin and three in the Spanish language; motets; anthems; and both sacred and secular songs.
