= Cáceres Co-cathedral =

Roman Catholic Co-cathedral in Cáceres, Spain

- Co-cathedral of Saint Mary
- Concatedral de Santa Maria
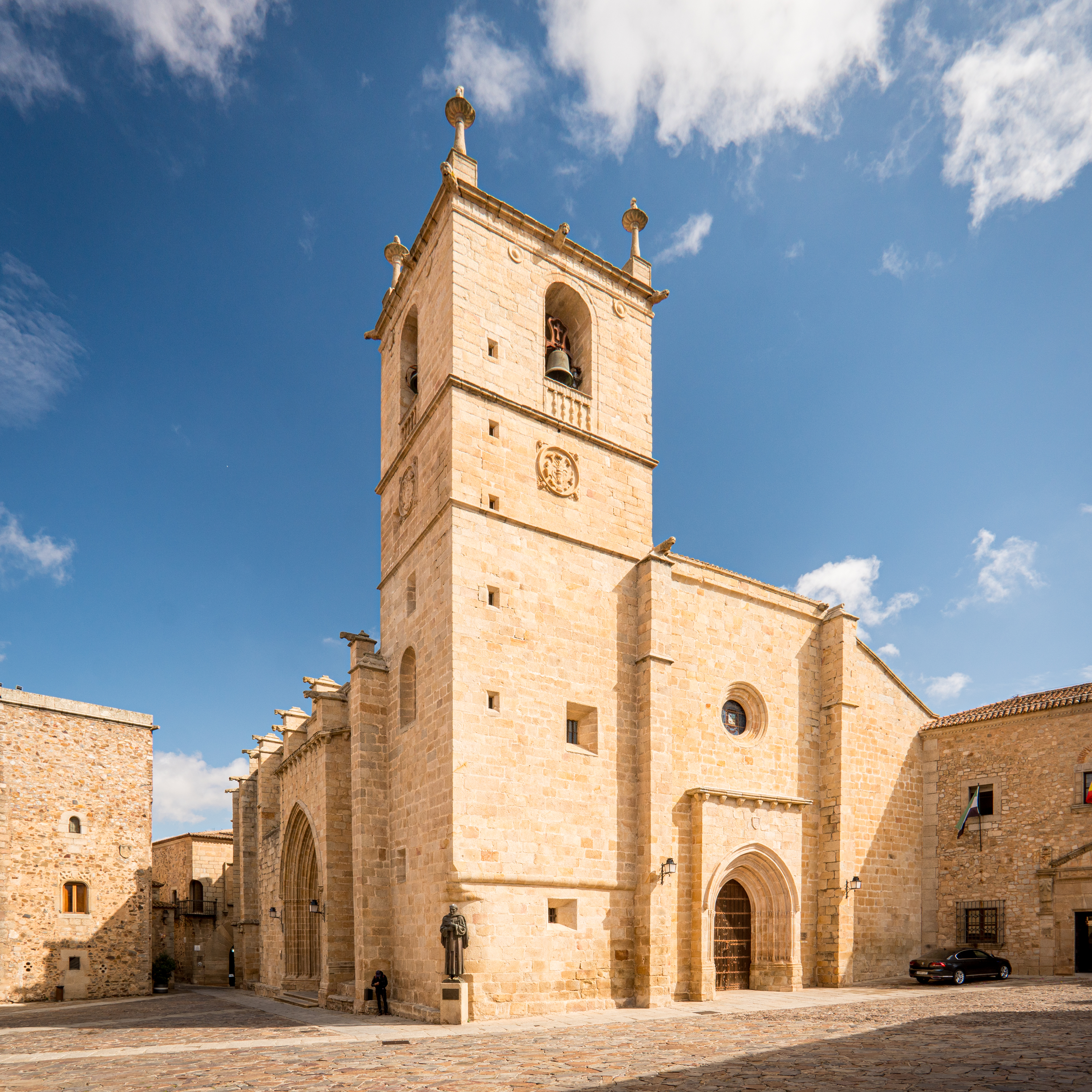
- North-west view in 2023.
- Cáceres Co-cathedral
- 39.4745°N 6.3701°W
- Location: Cáceres
- Address: 3, Plaza de Santa María
- Country: Spain
- Denomination: Catholic
- Website: concatedralcaceres.com

History
- Status: Co-cathedral
- Dedication: Mary, mother of Jesus
- Dedicated: 9 April 1957

Architecture
- Style: Late Gothic
- Years built: 15th—16th Centuries

Administration
- Metropolis: Mérida-Badajoz
- Diocese: Coria-Cáceres

Clergy
- Bishop: Jesús Pulido Arriero

UNESCO World Heritage Site
- Criteria: Cultural: (iii), (iv)
- Designated: 1986 (10th session)
- Part of: Old Town of Cáceres
- Reference no.: 384

Spanish Cultural Heritage
- Type: Non-movable
- Criteria: Monument
- Designated: 3 June 1931
- Reference no.: RI-51-0000487

The Co-cathedral of Saint Mary is a Catholic co-cathedral in Cáceres, Spain. It was elevated to the status of co-cathedral on 9 April 1957, sharing the seat of the Diocese of Coria-Cáceres with the Cathedral of the Assumption of Our Lady, in nearby Coria.

The co-cathedral was erected in the 15th century in a Gothic style, with the main portal following the Romanesque architectural tradition. Since 1986, it is an UNESCO World Heritage Site, along with the rest of the city's Old Town.

The main 16th-century retablo, dedicated to the Assumption of the Virgin, was carved by Roque Balduque and Diego Guillen Ferrant.

== Gallery ==
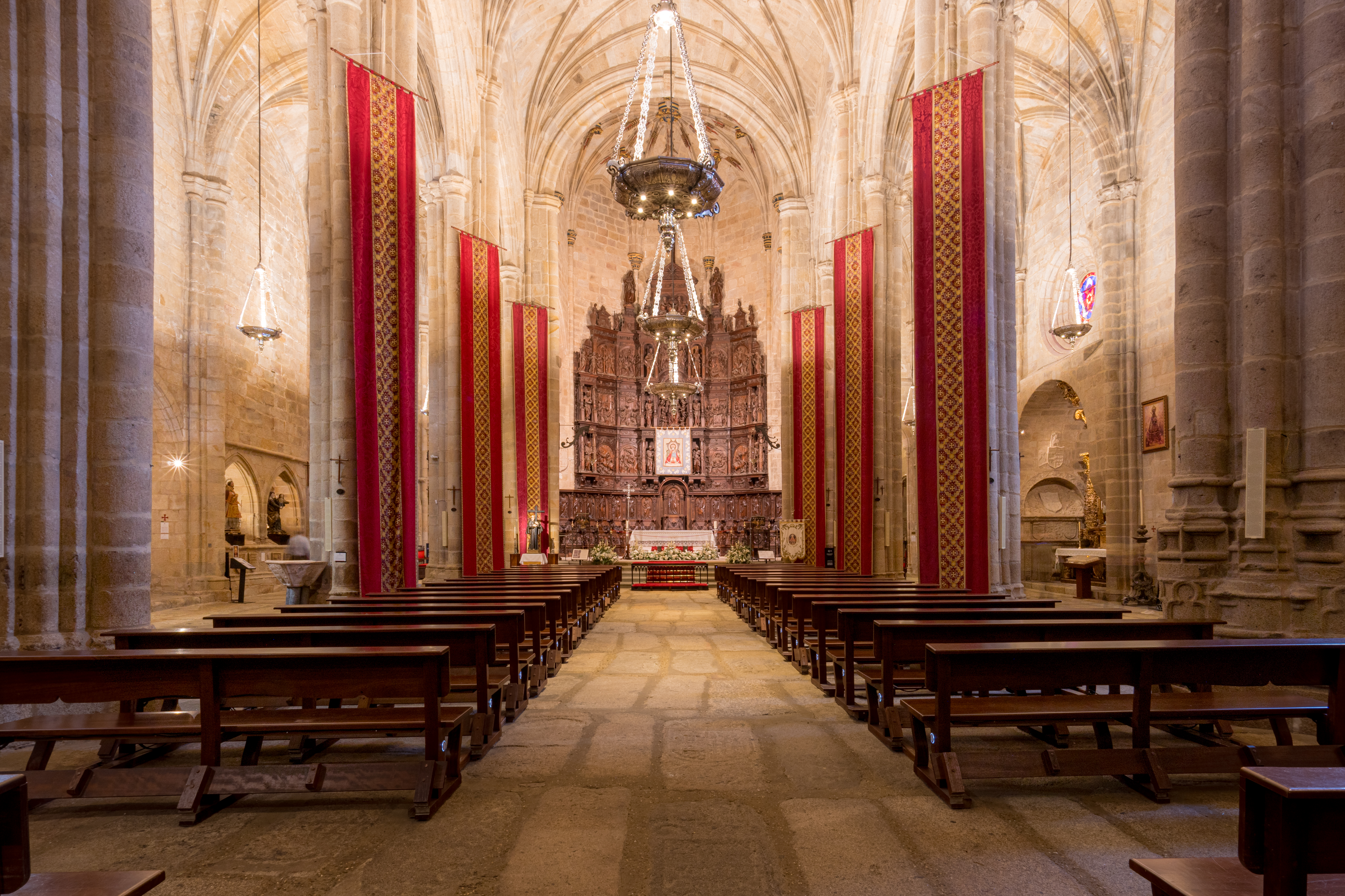
Interior overview

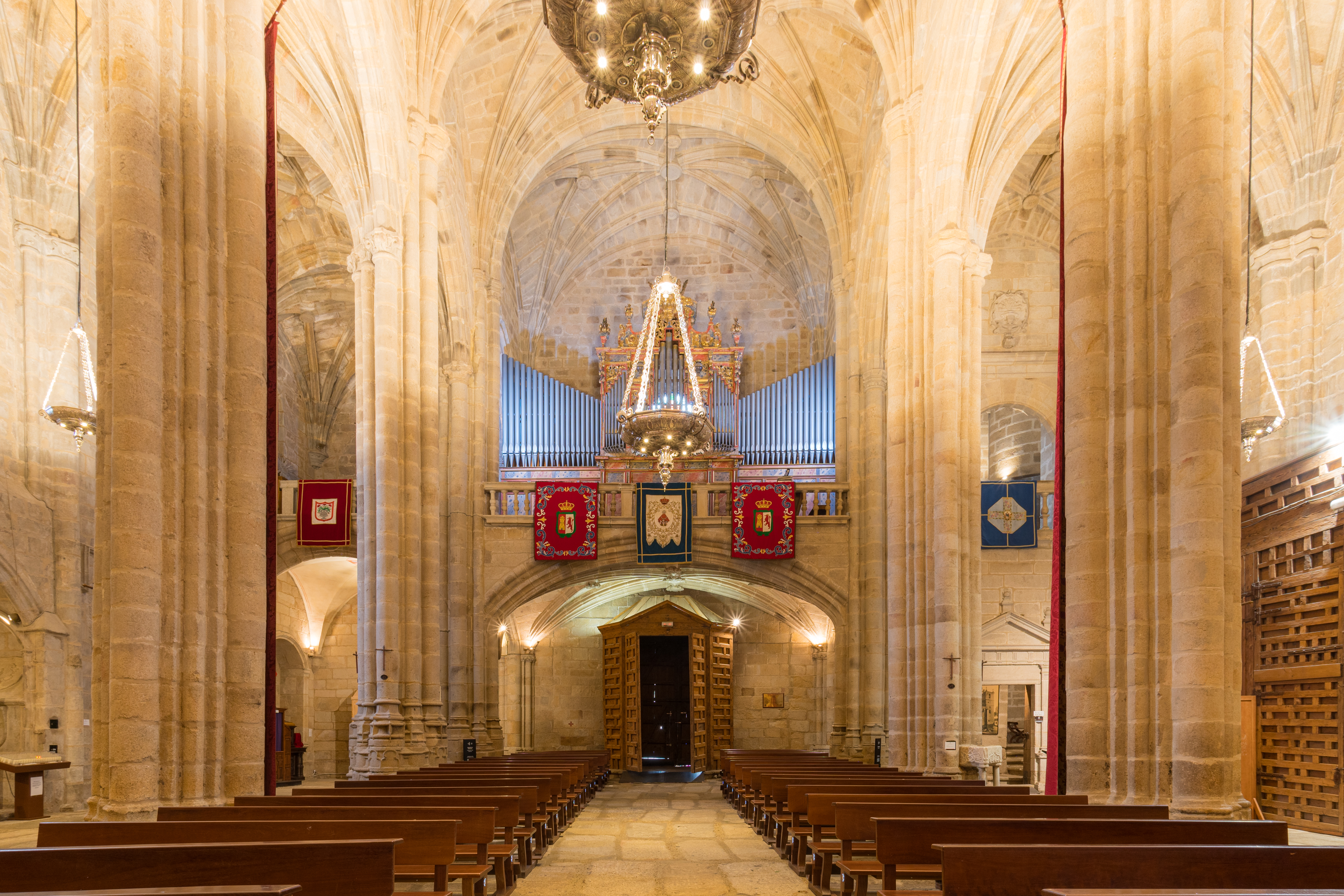
Organ

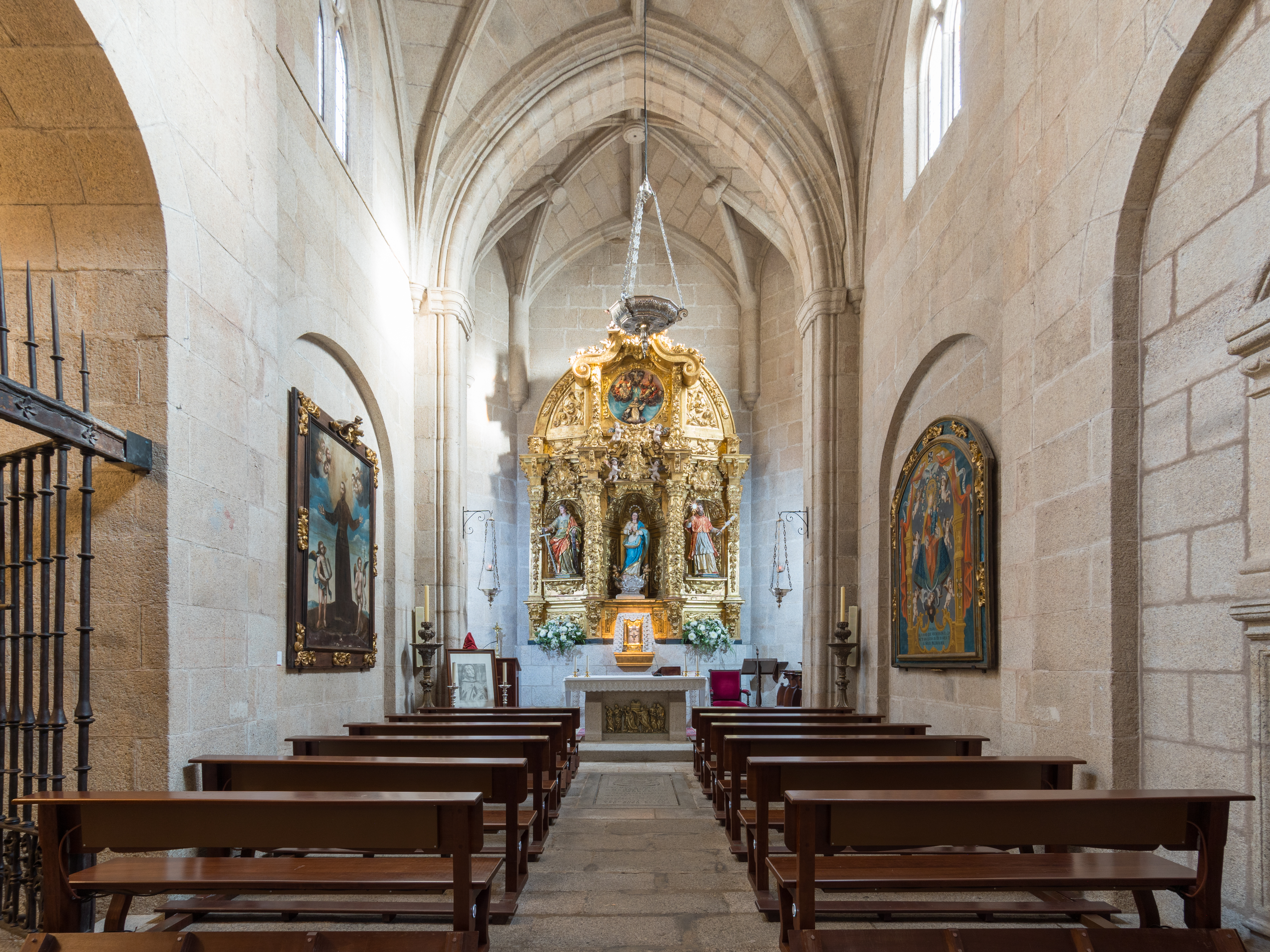
Chapel of the Holy Sacrament

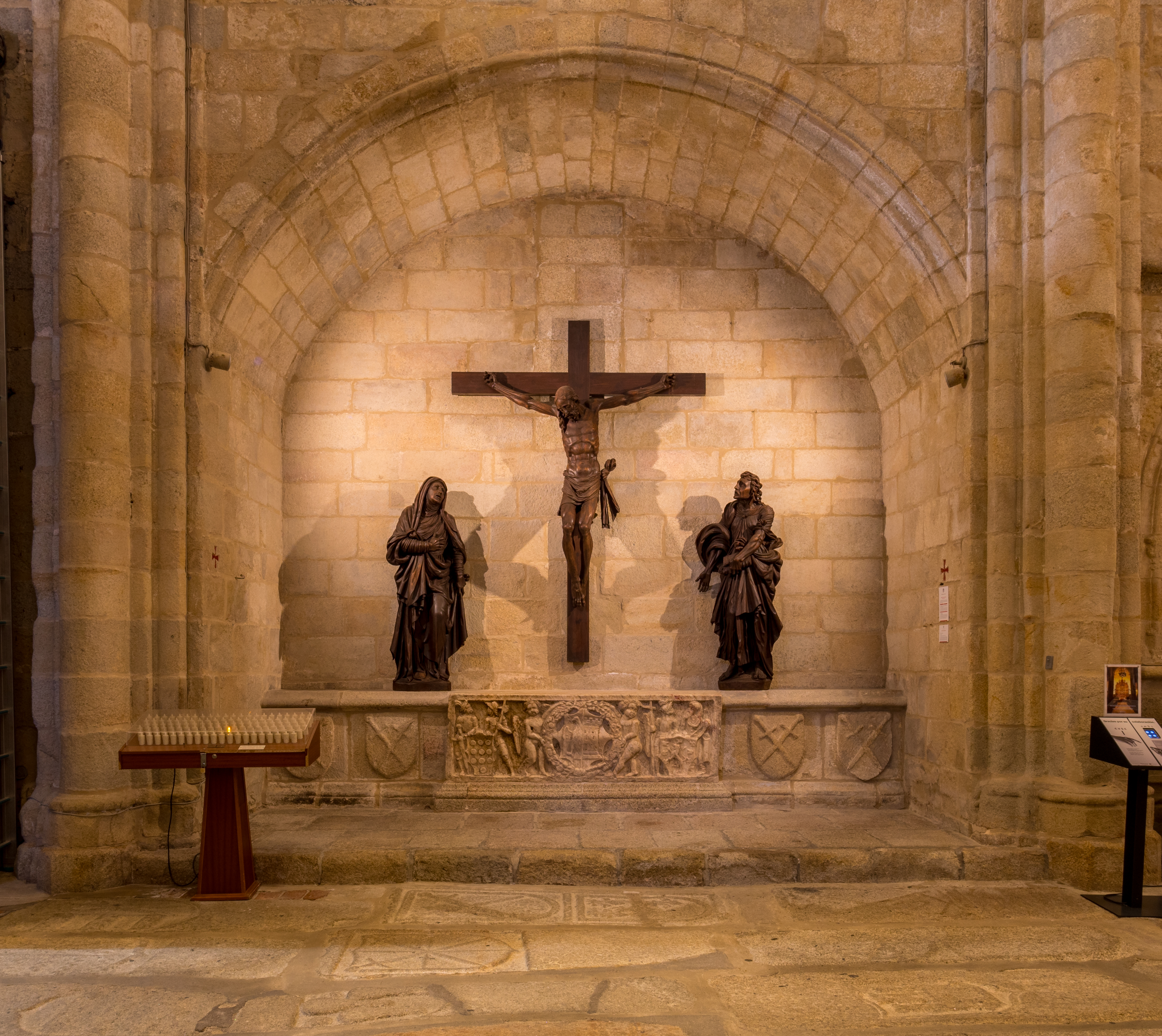
Triptych of the crucifixion

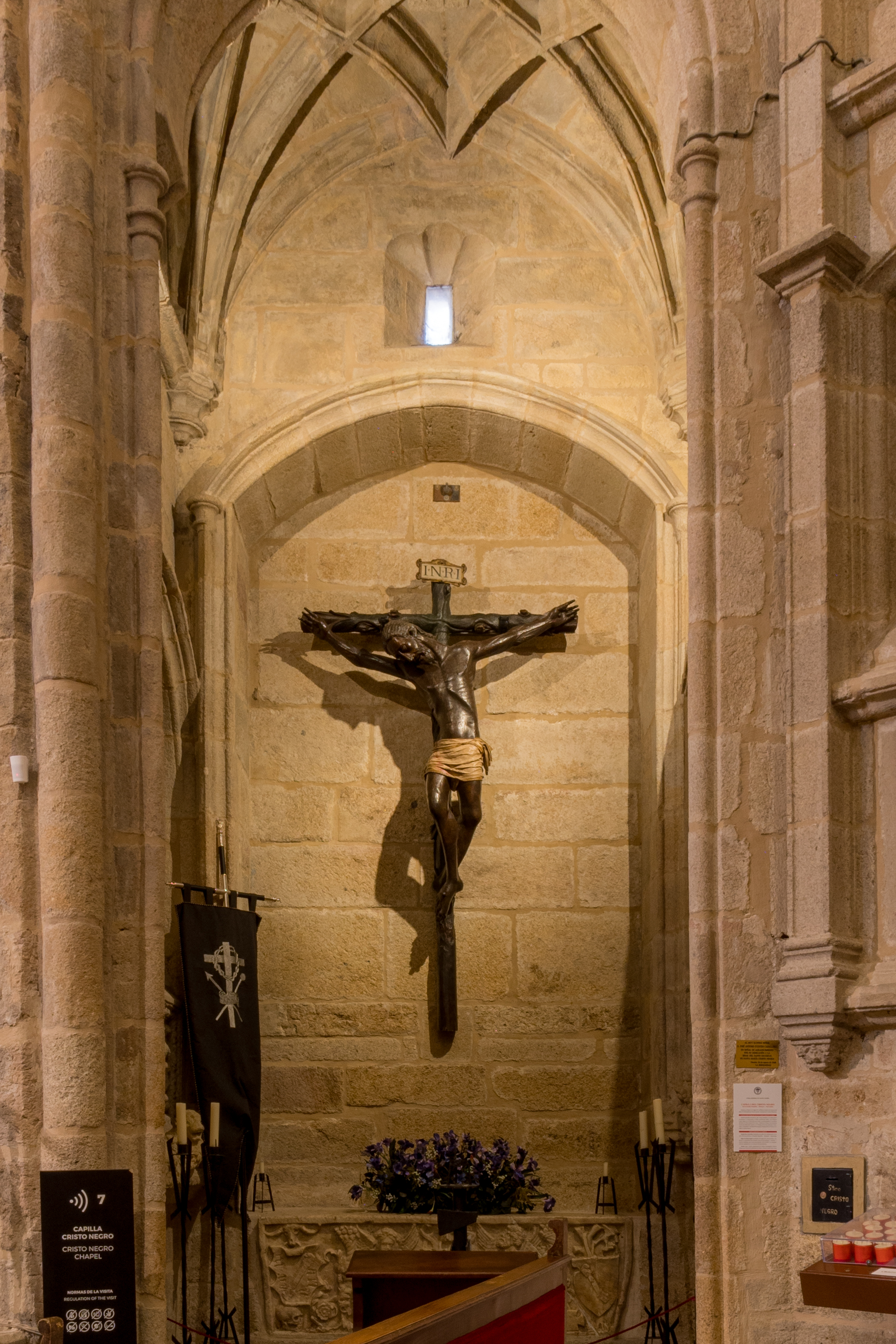
Chapel of the Black Christ

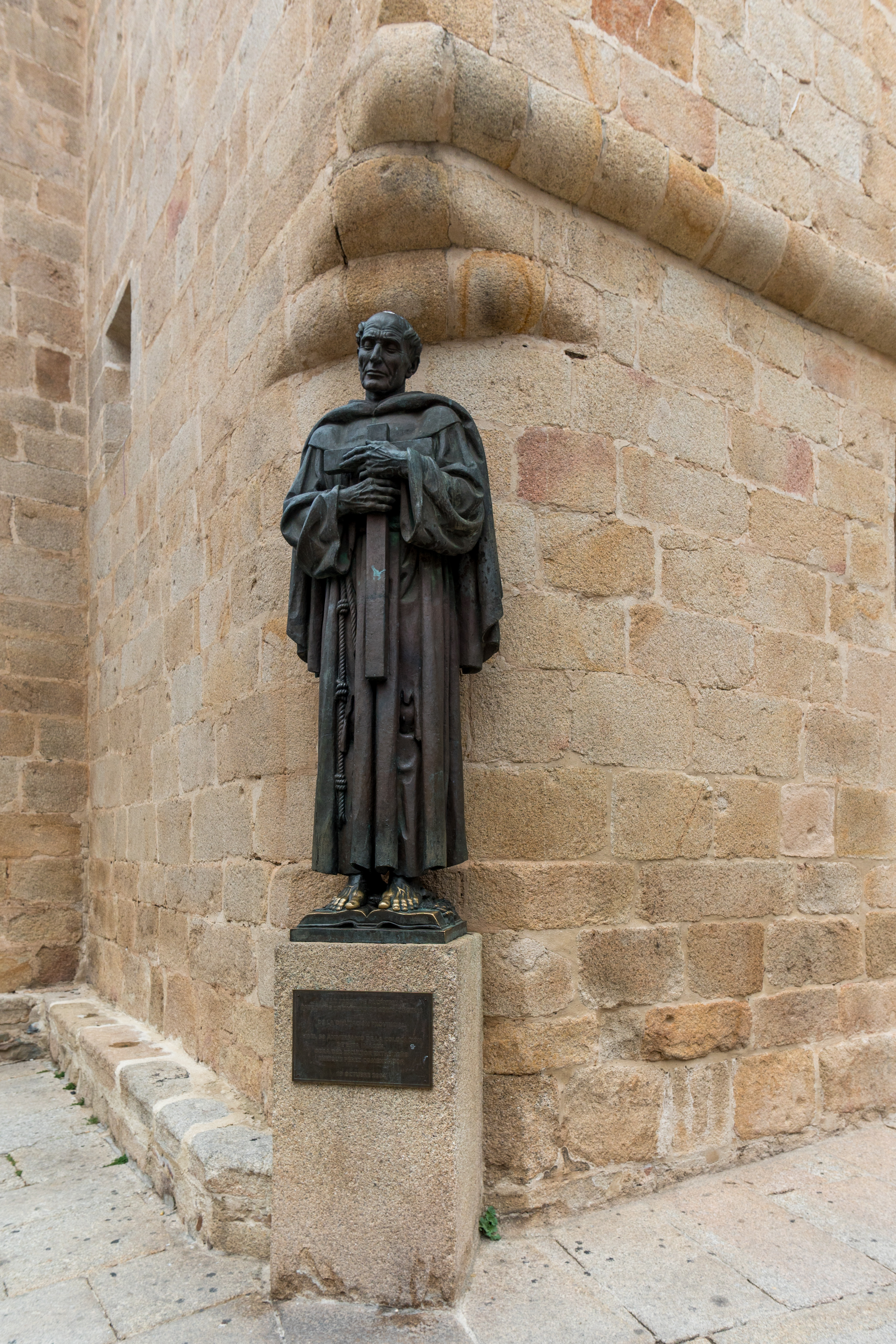
Statue of Peter of Alcántara by Enrique Pérez Comendador.
