= St. Dominic Cathedral, Moquegua =

Coordinates: 17.1940°S 70.9337°W

St. Dominic Cathedral
- Concatedral de Santo Domingo en Moquegua
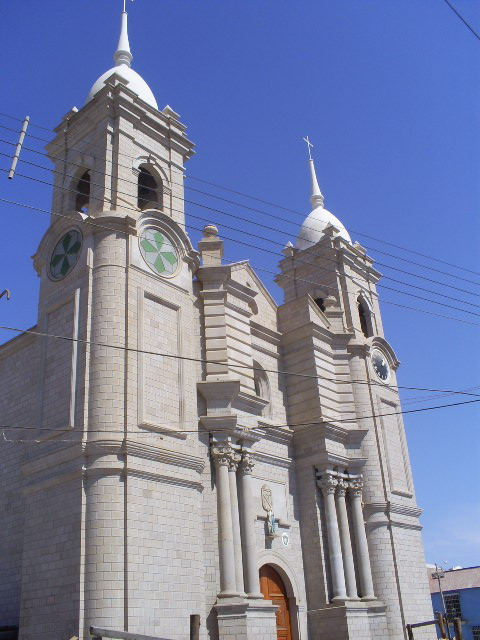
- St. Dominic Cathedral
- Location: Moquegua
- Country: Peru
- Denomination: Roman Catholic Church

Administration
- Diocese: Roman Catholic Diocese of Tacna and Moquegua

The St. Dominic Co-Cathedral (also known as Moquegua Cathedral; Spanish: Concatedral de Santo Domingo en Moquegua), is the main Catholic church in the city of Moquegua in Peru. It is a property of the Catholic Church. It is located in the Plaza de armas de Moquegua.

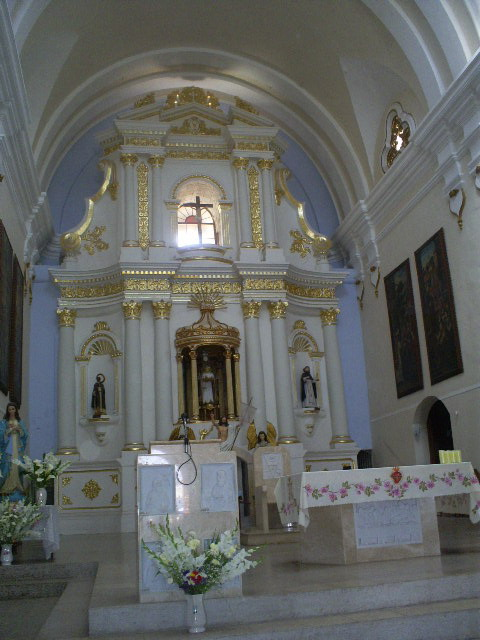
Internal view

It is a co-cathedral that follows the Roman or Latin rite and is one of the two co-cathedrals owned by the Diocese of Tacna and Moquegua (Dioecesis Tacnensis et Moqueguensis) that was created in 1944 by Pope Pius XII through the bull Nihil potius et Antiquius.

It is under the pastoral responsibility of Bishop Marco Antonio Cortez Lara.

== See also ==
- Roman Catholicism in Peru
- St. Dominic Cathedral
