= Ferrol Co-Cathedral =

Roman Catholic Co-Cathedral in Spain

- Co-Cathedral of Saint Julian
- Concatedral de San Julián; Concatedral de San Xiao
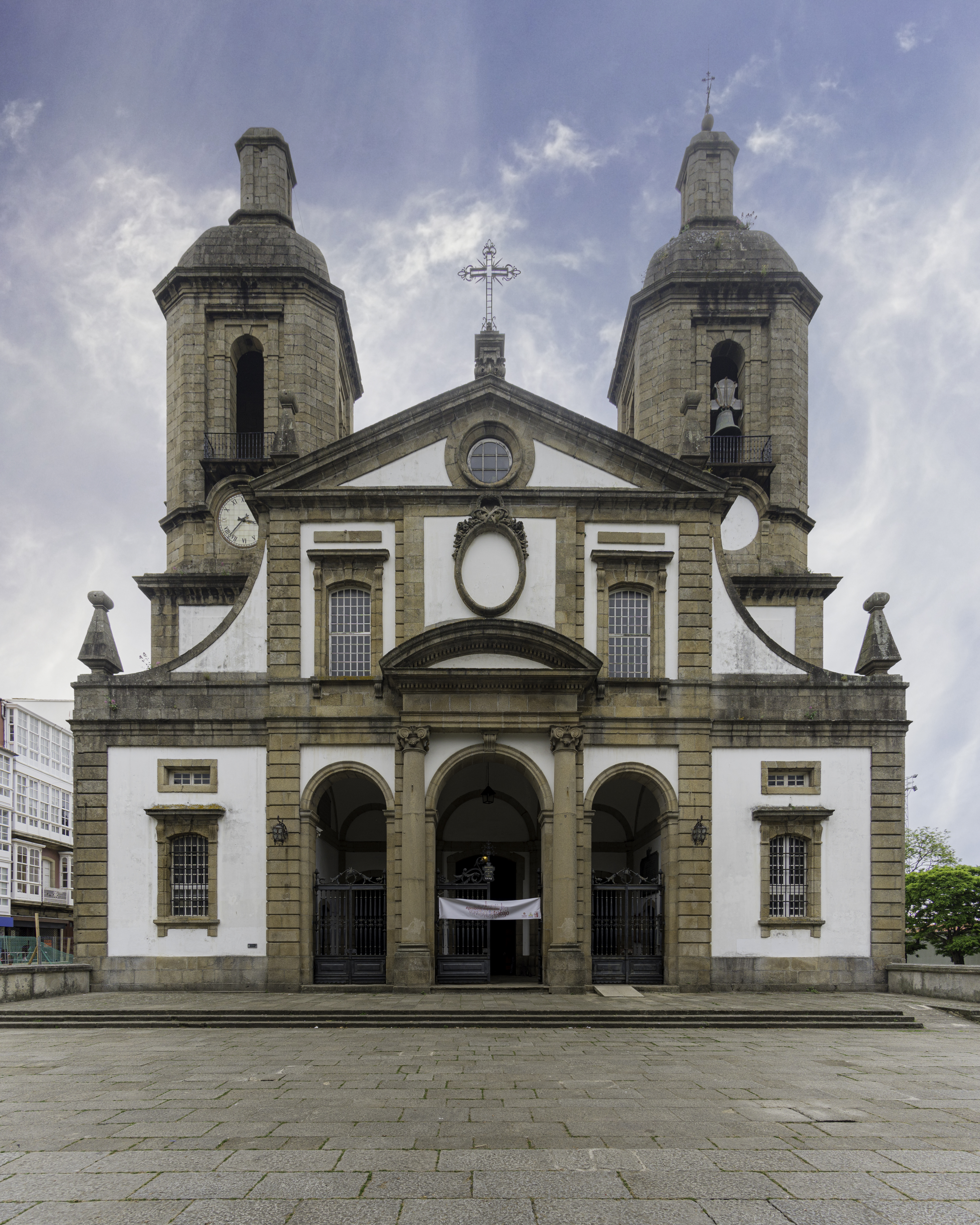
- West façade
- Ferrol Co-Cathedral
- 43.4822°N 8.2350°W
- Location: Ferrol
- Address: 104, Rua Igrexa
- Country: Spain
- Denomination: Catholic

History
- Status: Co-Cathedral
- Dedication: Julian of Antinoe
- Dedicated: 14 August 1959

Architecture
- Architect: Julián Sánchez Bort
- Style: Neoclassic
- Years built: 1765 - 1772

Administration
- Metropolis: Santiago de Compostela
- Diocese: Mondoñedo-Ferrol

Clergy
- Bishop: Fernando García Cadiñanos

Spanish Cultural Heritage
- Type: Non-movable
- Criteria: Monument
- Designated: 9 March 1984
- Reference no.: RI-53-0000322

The Co-Cathedral of Saint Julian (Galician: Concatedral de San Xiao; Spanish: Catedral de San Julian) is a Roman Catholic co-cathedral in the town of Ferrol (which in ecclesiastical terms belongs to the Diocese of Mondoñedo-Ferrol) in the autonomous community of Galicia, Spain.

== History ==
The church was erected in 1763, designed by Julián Sánchez Bort, who based his Neoclassical design on the church of Sant'Andrea delle Fratte in Rome and it was built on the site of an old Romanesque church. It was completed in 1772.

The church was made co-cathedral along with the Cathedral of Mondoñedo in 1959 via papal bull from John XXIII.

== Description ==
Even if the church is considered neoclassical, its central floor and first projects were from the Renaissance, it also has the unusual trait of having a Greek cross instead of a Latin cross. It is covered with a big cupola that is not visible from the exterior. It possesses lateral chapels and the main façade is flanked by two towers with cupolas. Models characteristic of the Mannerism movement are present.

== Gallery ==
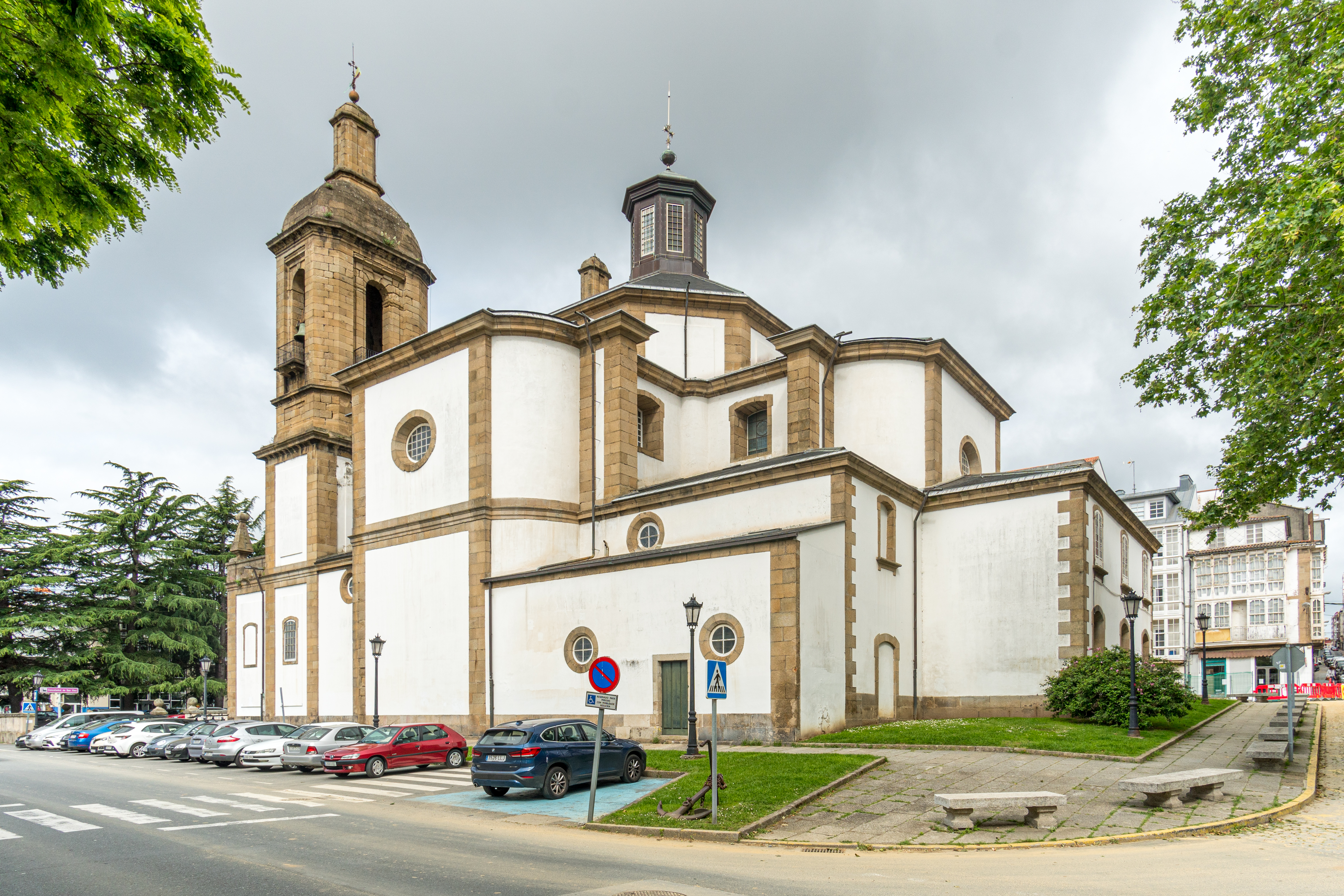
South façade

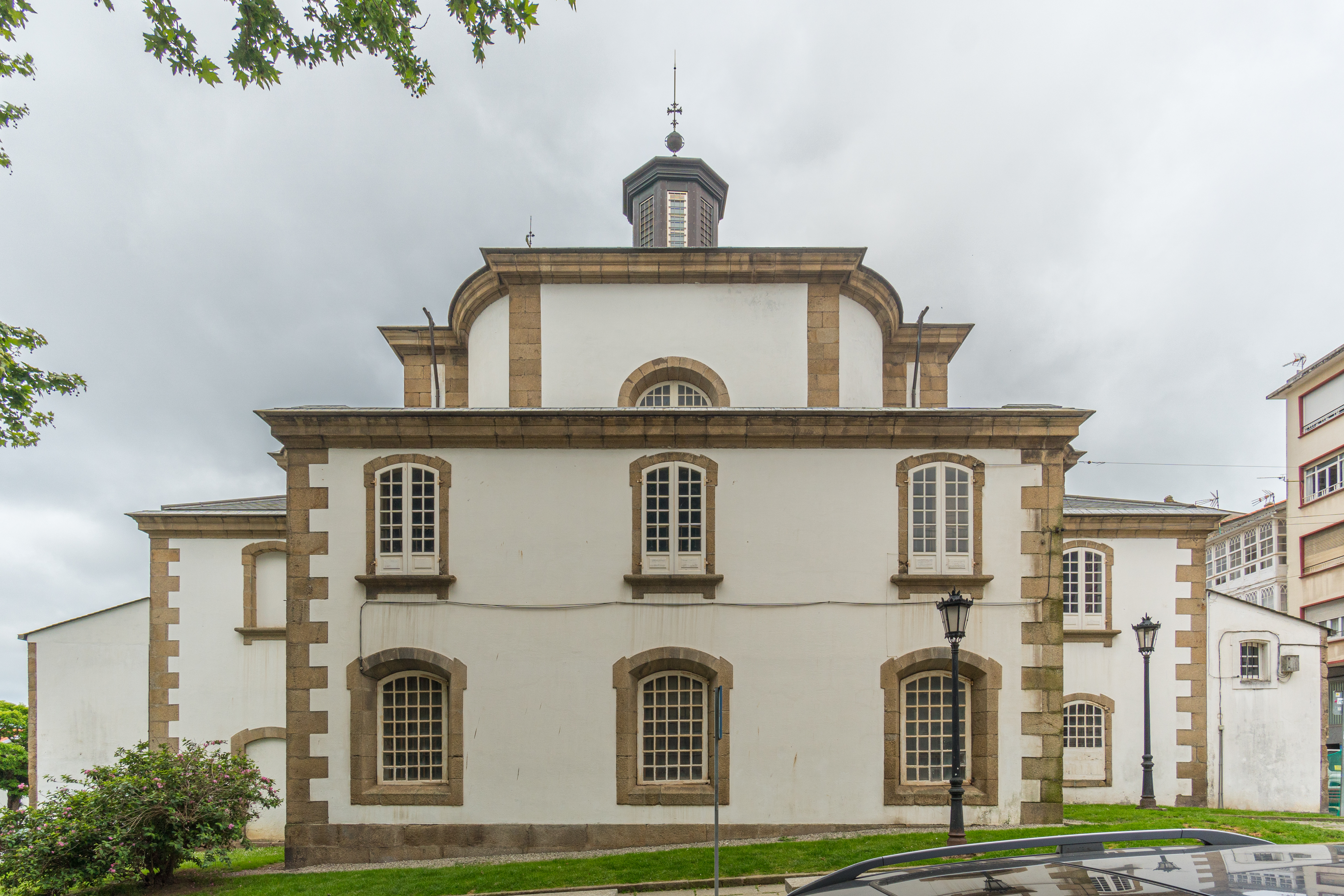
Apse

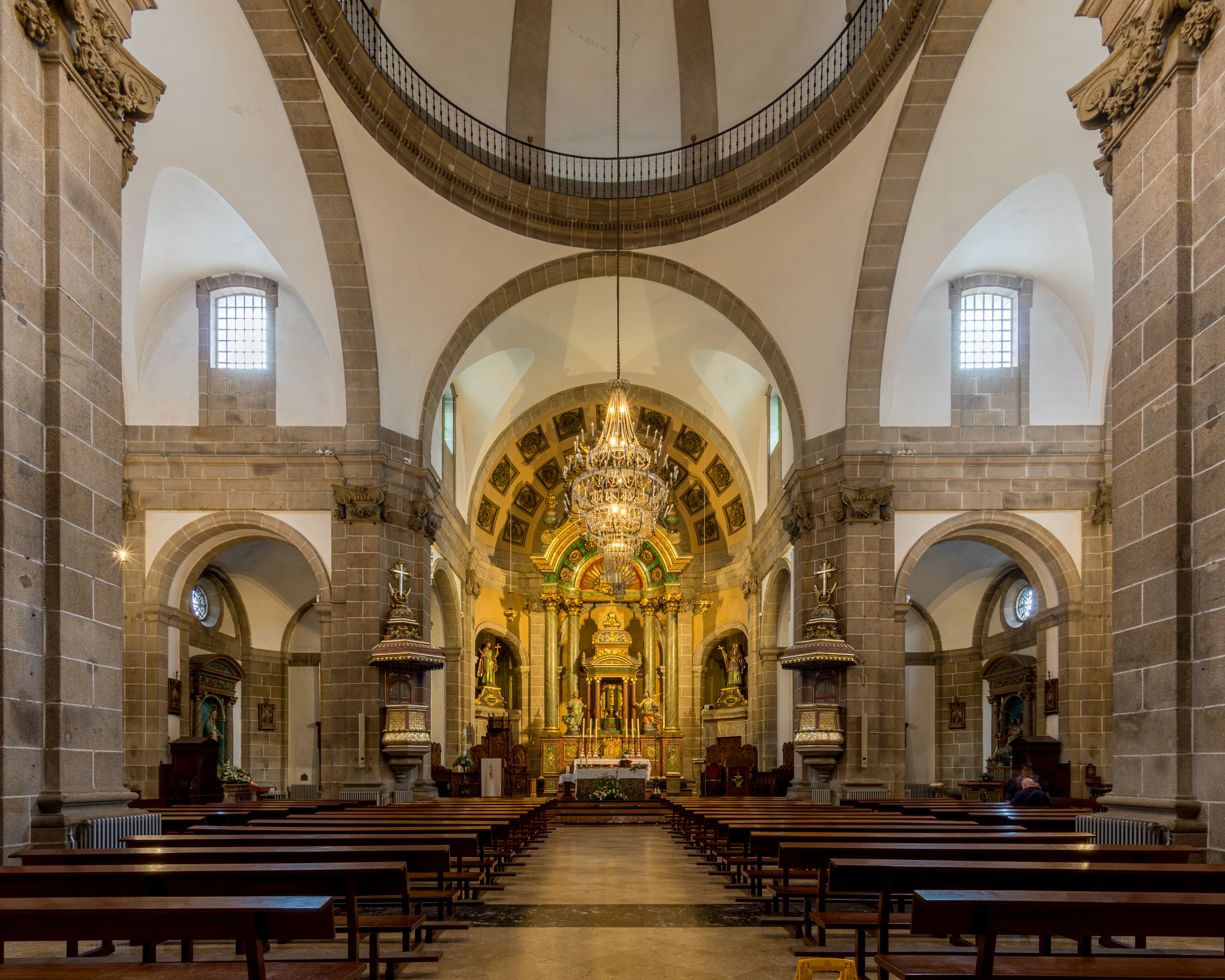
Interior

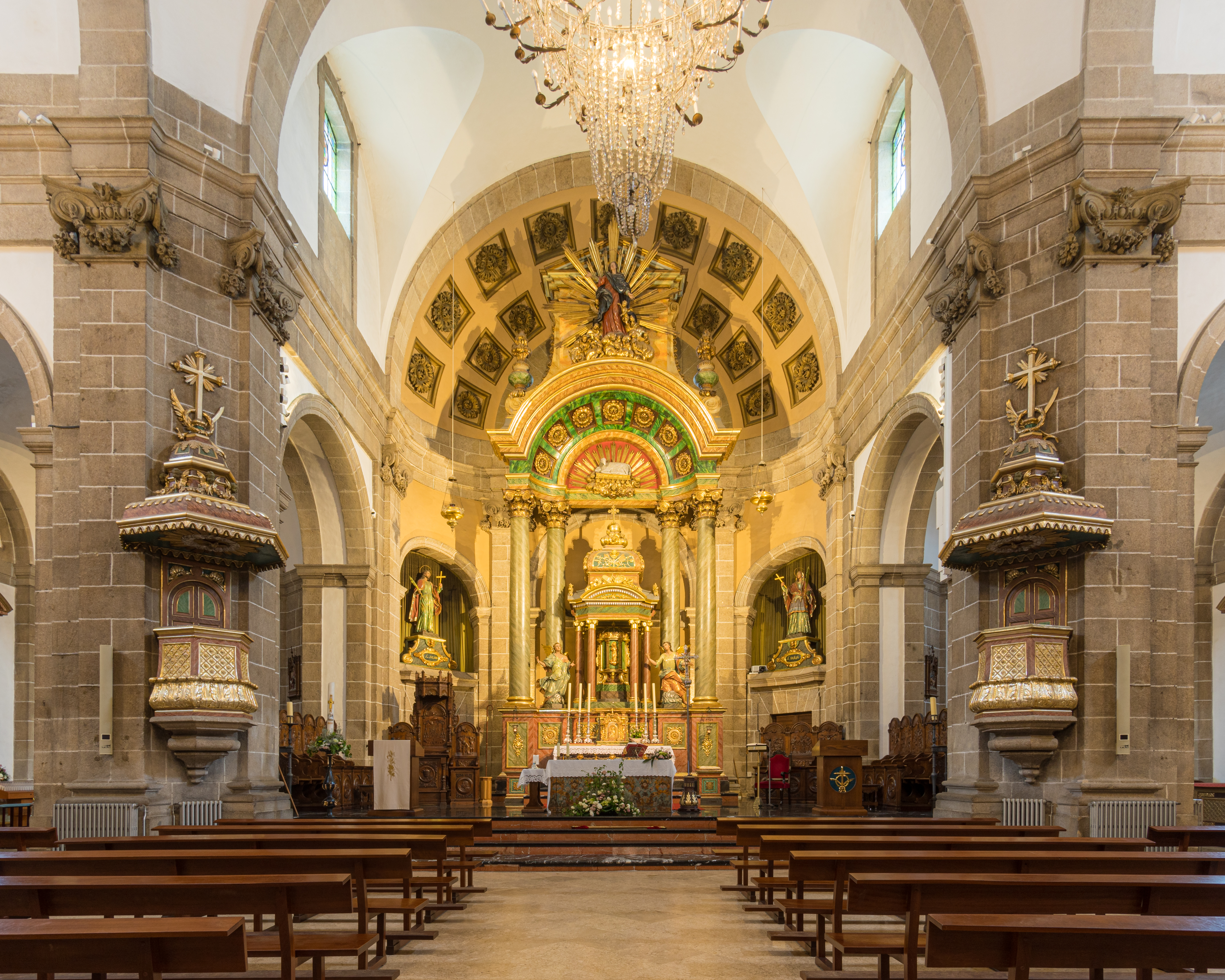
Altar
