= Guadalajara Co-cathedral =

Catholic Co-Cathedral in Guadalajara, Spain

- Co-cathedral of Saint Mary the Major
- Concatedral de Santa María la Mayor
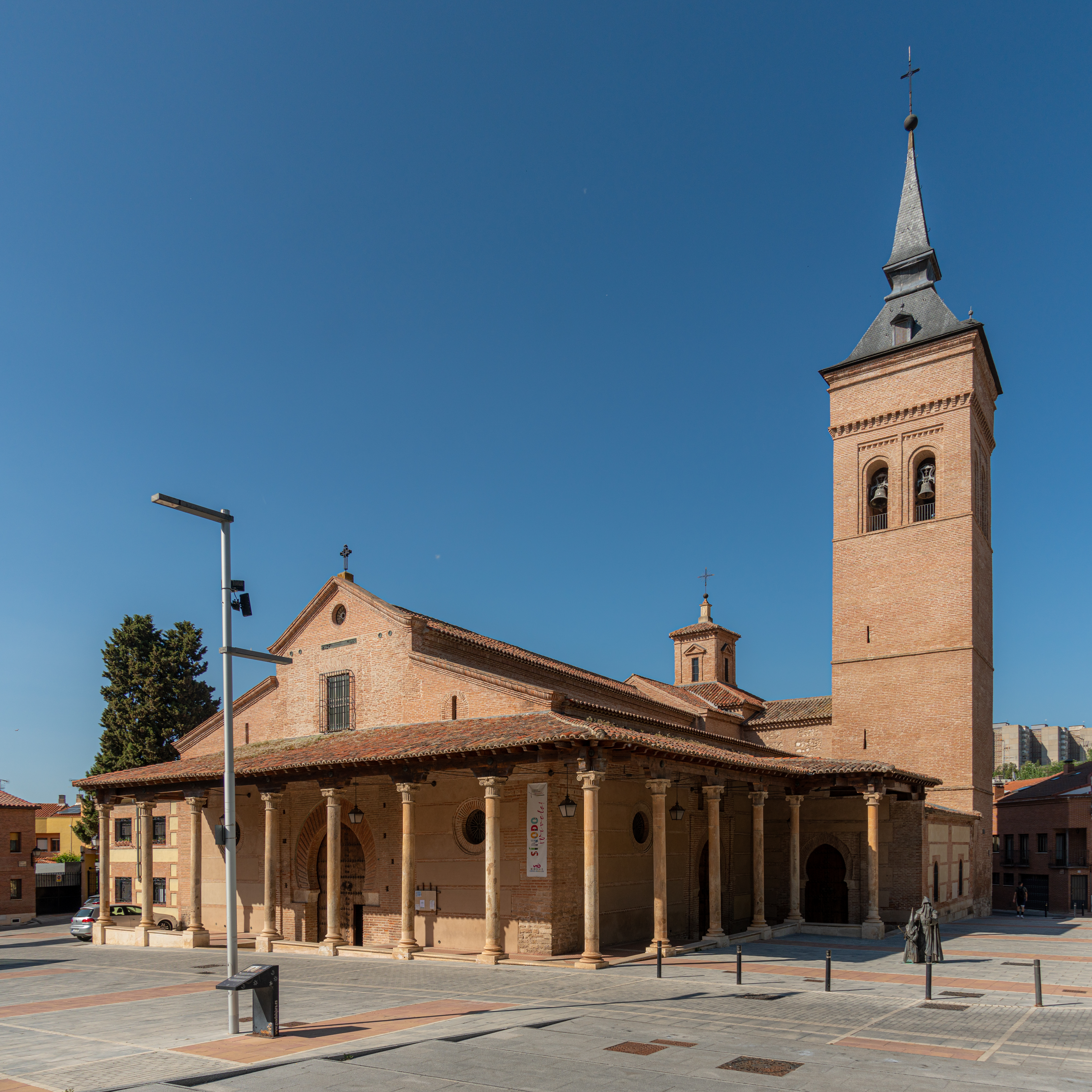
- West façade and tower
- Guadalajara Co-cathedral
- 40.634505°N 3.162777°W
- Location: Guadalajara
- Address: 5, Plaza Santa María
- Country: Spain
- Denomination: Catholic
- Website: santamarialamayor.es

History
- Status: Co-cathedral
- Dedication: Mary, mother of Jesus
- Dedicated: 15 August 1959

Architecture
- Style: Mudejar, Baroque
- Years built: 13th - 16th century

Administration
- Metropolis: Toledo
- Diocese: Sigüenza-Guadalajara

Clergy
- Bishop: Julián Ruiz Martorell

Spanish Cultural Heritage
- Type: Non-movable
- Criteria: Monument
- Designated: 12 July 1941
- Reference no.: RI-51-0001110

The Co-cathedral of Santa María la Mayor (Spanish: Concatedral de Santa María la Mayor) is a co-cathedral located in Guadalajara, in Castile-La Mancha, Spain. It is one of the seats of the Roman Catholic Diocese of Sigüenza-Guadalajara.

The building was built in the Mudéjar style. It was declared Bien de Interés Cultural on 12 July 1941.
