= Co-Cathedral of Santa María, Vigo =

Church in Vigo, Spain

Co-Cathedral of Saint Mary
- Concatedral de Santa María de Vigo
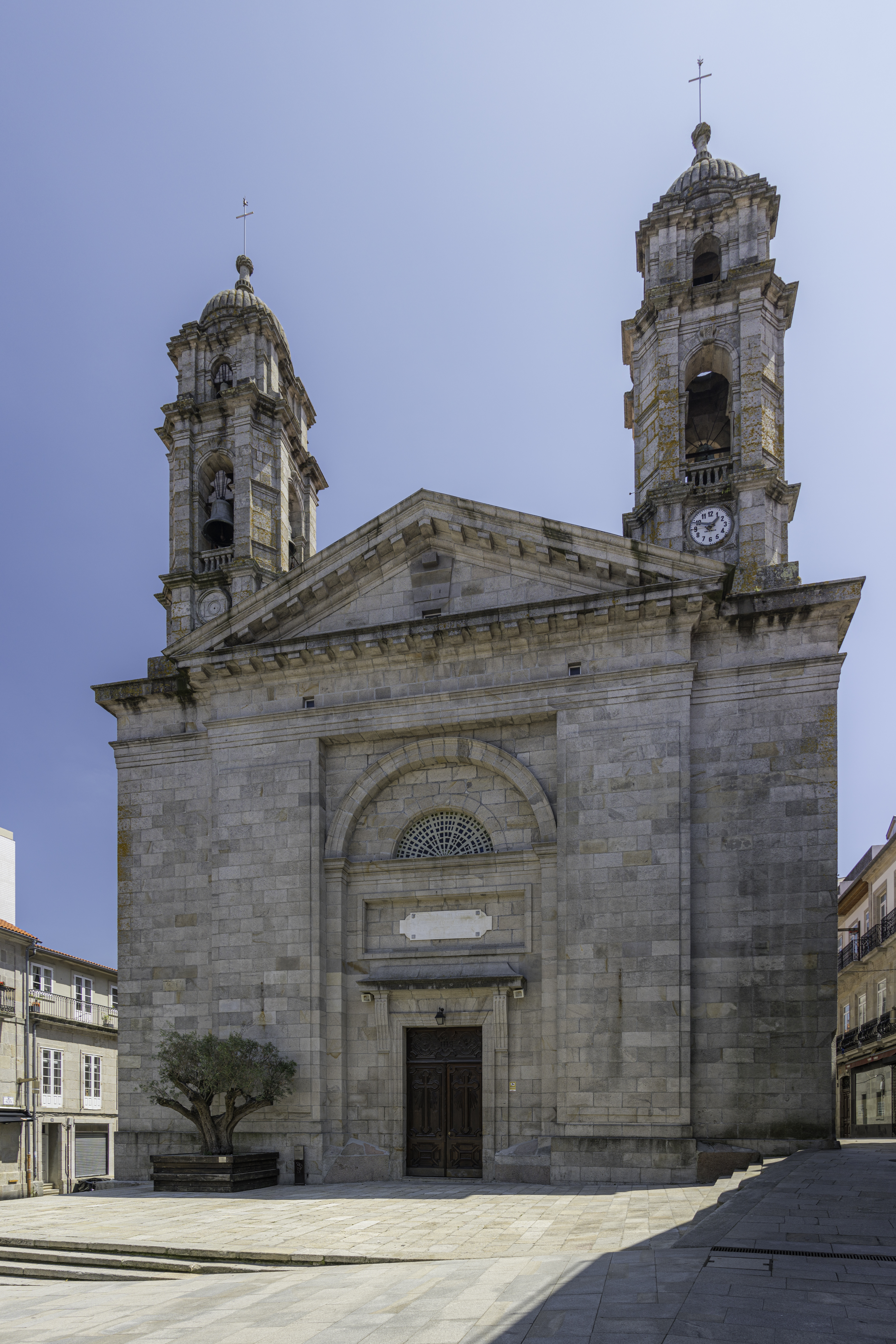
- Facade of the building.

Religion
- Affiliation: Roman Catholic
- Ecclesiastical or organizational status: Co-Cathedral

Location
- Location: Vigo, Spain
- Interactive map of Co-Cathedral of Saint Mary

Architecture
- Architect: Melchor de Prado y Mariño
- Style: Baroque, neoclassical
- Completed: 1838
- Direction of façade: West

Co-Cathedral of Saint Mary of Vigo (Galician and Spanish: Concatedral de Santa María de Vigo), known locally as A Colexiata, (The Collegiate) is a Spanish Baroque/Neoclassical Catholic temple located in Vigo. It is co-cathedral with Tui Cathedral, both sharing the seat for the Diocese of Tui-Vigo.

== History ==
There are records of the existence of a church dedicated to Saint Mary located in Vigo since at least the 12th century. This temple was followed by another in the Gothic style, built at the end of the 14th century and completed in 1403. In 1585, the church was ransacked and burned by the English privateer Francis Drake. In 1809, a nearby powder magazine at O Castro fortress exploded. The church suffered extensive damage and had to be rebuilt.

The project was commissioned to Melchor de Prado y Mariño, a member of the Royal Academy of San Fernando, who presented it in 1811 in Neoclassical style, although work did not begin until 1816 due to the Peninsular War. The building was completed in 1838 and stands out for its robustness. In fact, it was designed as a possible stronghold in the aftermath of the war.

The temple is declared "Bien de Interés Cultural" (although it is not stated when it was selected BIC). In 2020 the Vatican designated the co-cathedral as a basilica after validating the requests of the bishopric.

== Description ==
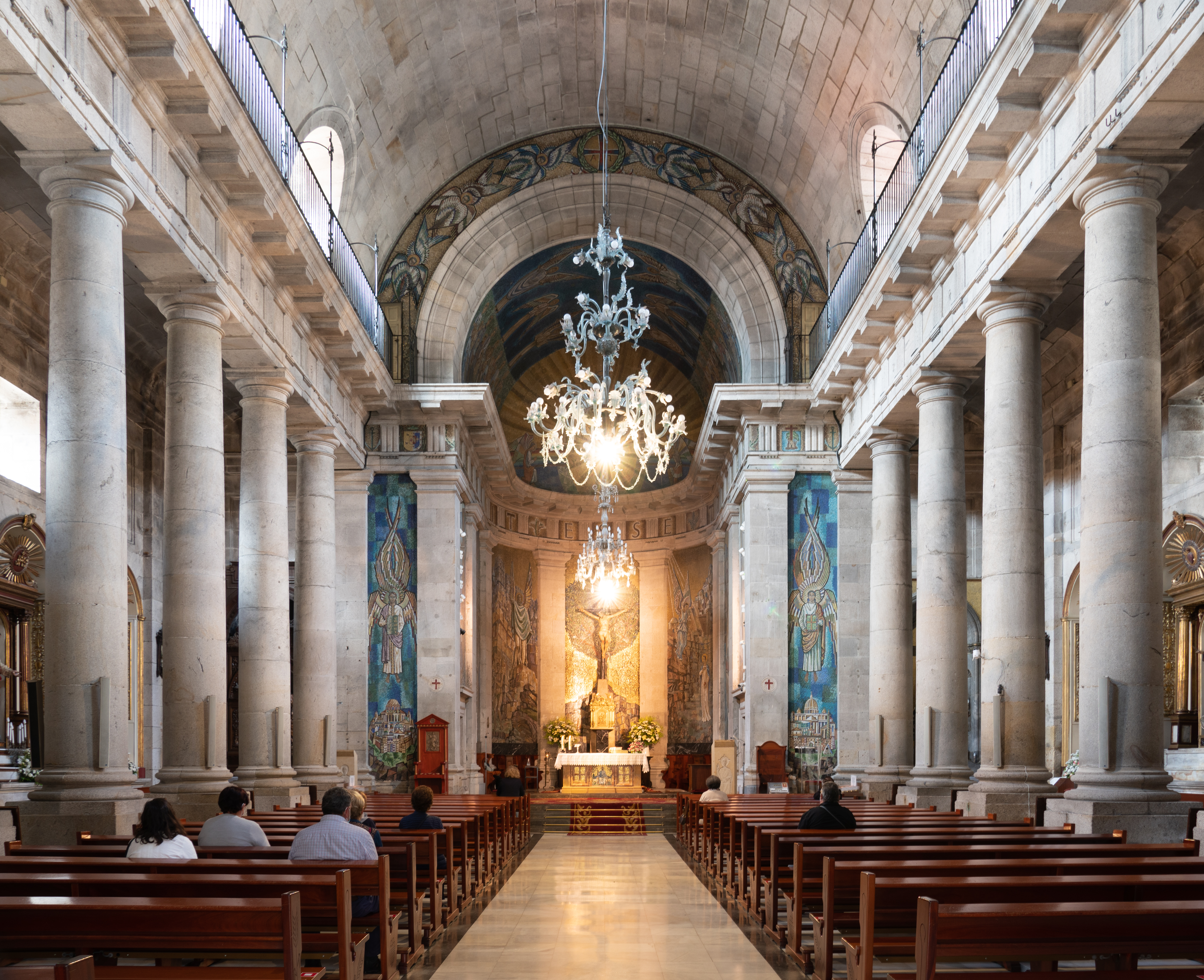
Interior of the temple

This basilica with three naves has a façade with simple ornamentation and a unique sundial on its right side, which faces the west.

Inside, the large mosaics of the main altar stand out, created by the prestigious Spanish mosaic artist Santiago Padrós, and characterised by their monumentality and the geometrisation of the landscape.
