= Co-Cathedral of San Pedro, Soria =

Co-cathedral of San Pedro
- Concatedral de San Pedro (Spanish)
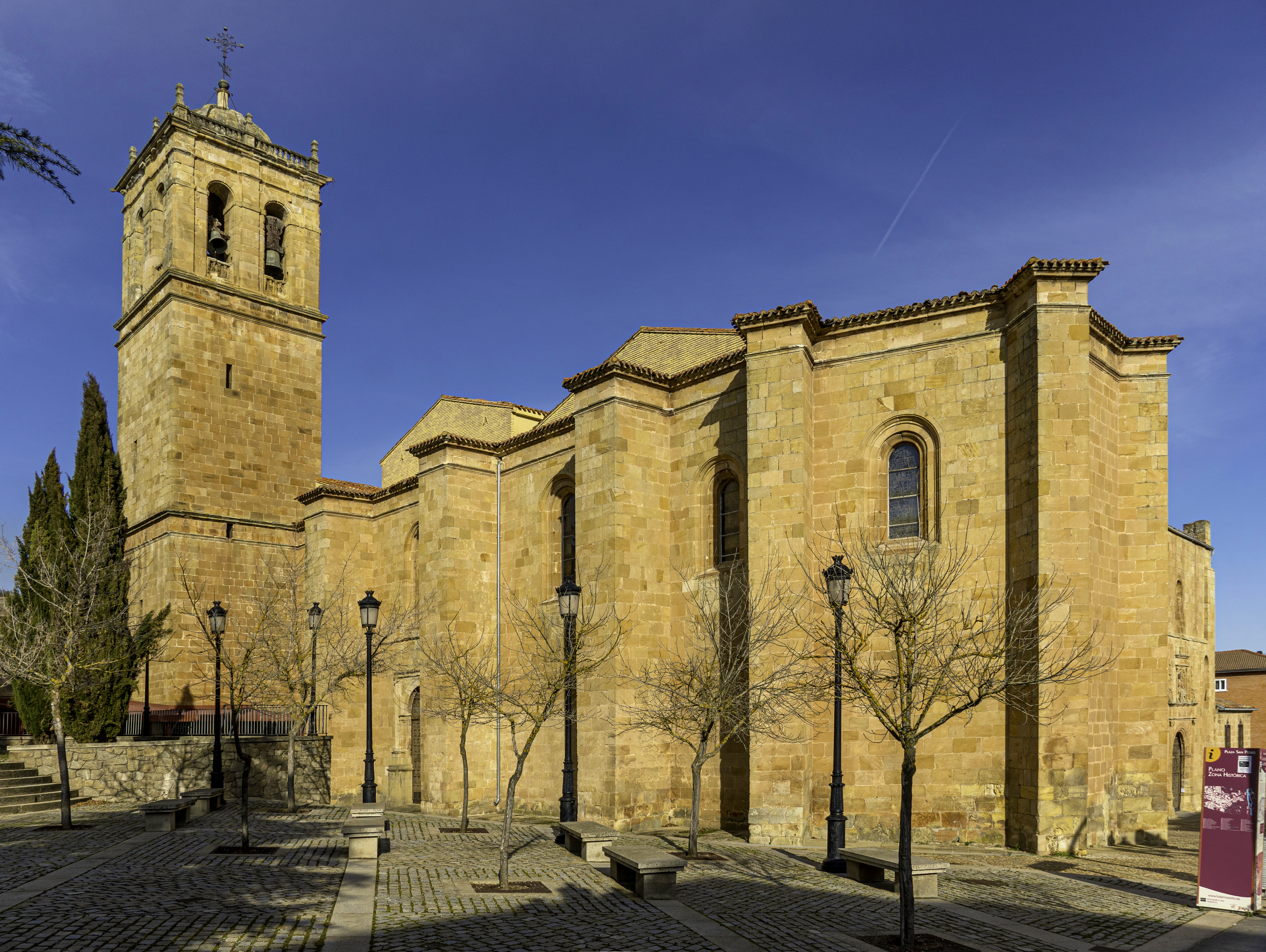
- South-east façade.

- Location within Spain
- 41.76604°N 2.459038°W
- Location: Soria, Spain

Spanish Cultural Heritage
- Official name: Concatedral de San Pedro
- Type: Non-movable
- Criteria: Monument
- Designated: 1979
- Reference no.: RI-51-0004390

The Co-cathedral of San Pedro (Spanish: Concatedral de San Pedro) is a medieval building in Soria, Spain. It is in the Roman Catholic Diocese of Osma-Soria.

== History ==
Dedicated to St. Peter, it was a collegiate church from the 11th century.

It was built in the centre of the medieval town.

It was raised to the status of cathedral in the 1959.

During the 2016 Extraordinary Jubilee Year of Mercy, the Co-Cathedral served as a Jubilee Shrine, with "Doors of Mercy.

== Conservation ==
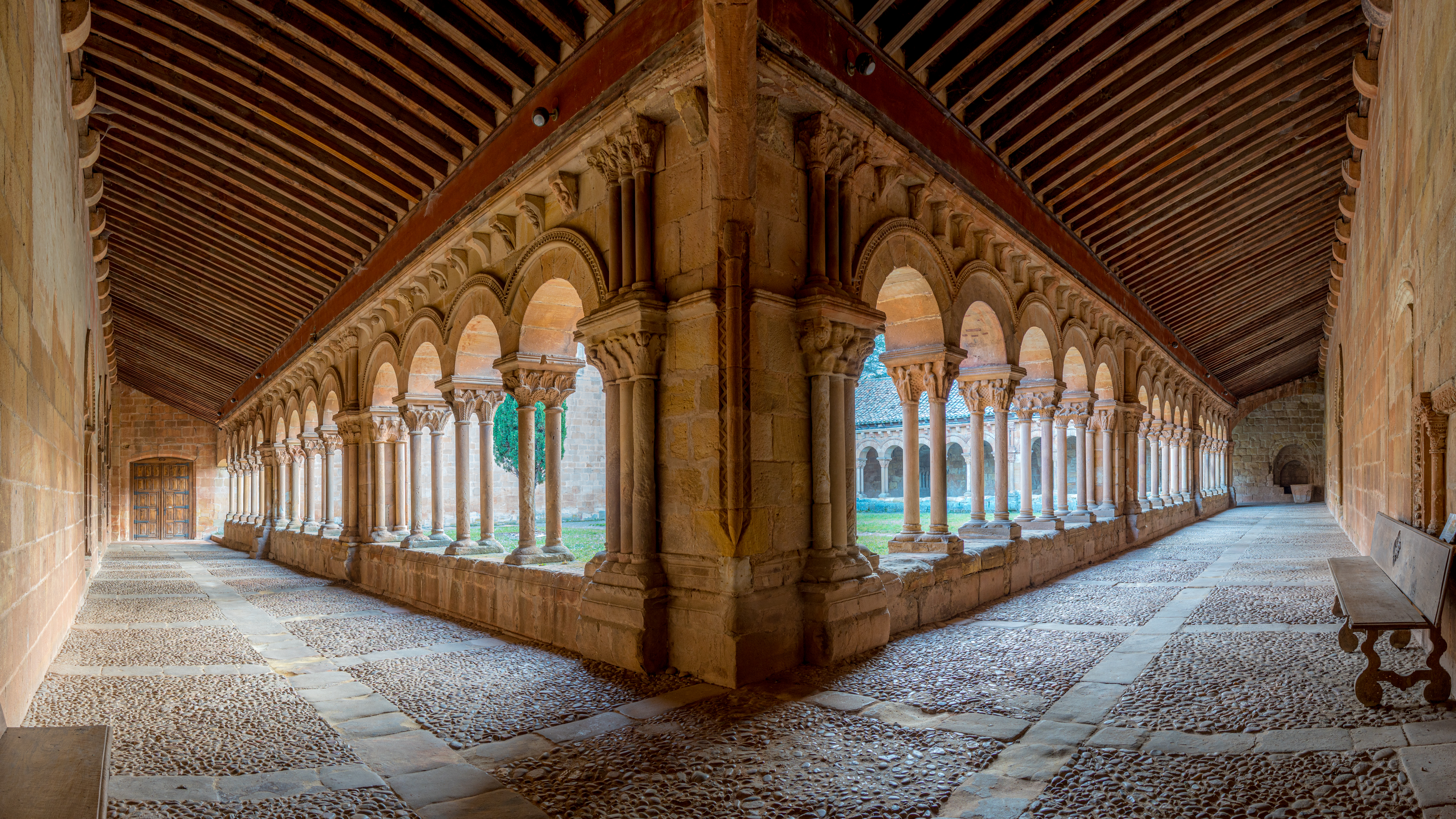
Panorama of the cloister, 12th century.

The cloister was given a heritage listing in the 1920s.

It was declared Bien de Interés Cultural in 1979.
