= Coria Cathedral =

Roman Catholic church in Spain

- Cathedral of Saint Mary of the Assumption
- Catedral de Santa Maria de la Asunción
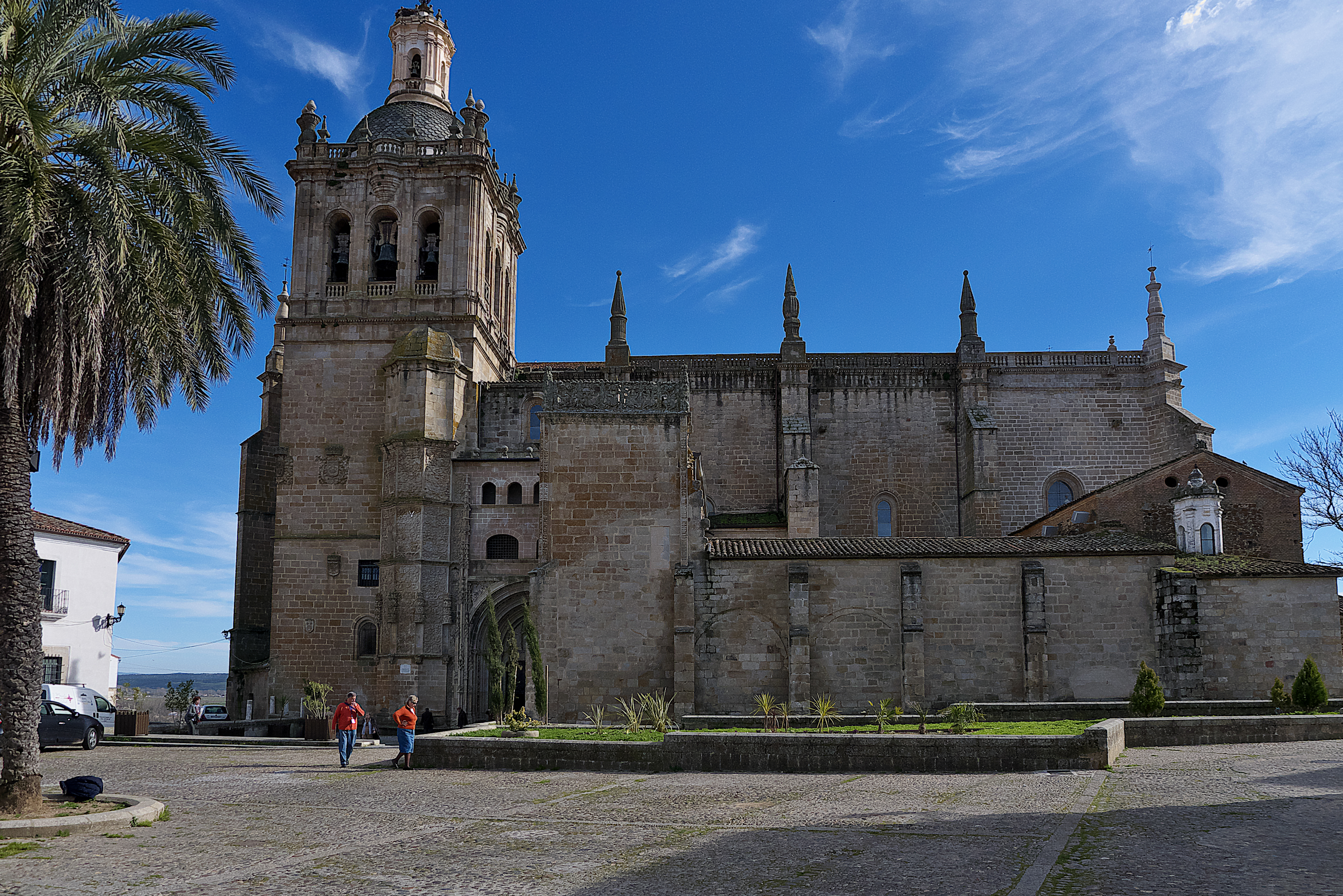
- North façade.
- Coria Cathedral
- 39.9820°N 6.5371°W
- Location: Coria
- Address: 5, Plaza de la Catedral
- Country: Spain
- Denomination: Catholic
- Website: catedraldecoria.com

History
- Status: Cathedral
- Dedication: Assumption of Mary
- Dedicated: 20 April 1898

Architecture
- Style: Late Gothic, Plateresque
- Years built: 1496–1646

Administration
- Metropolis: Mérida–Badajoz
- Diocese: Coria-Cáceres

Clergy
- Bishop: Jesús Pulido Arriero

Spanish Cultural Heritage
- Type: Non-movable
- Criteria: Monument
- Designated: 3 June 1931
- Reference no.: RI-51-0000483

The Catedral of Saint Mary of the Assumption is a Roman Catholic church located in the town of Coria, Region of Extremadura, Spain.

== History ==
The cathedral construction began in 1496 at the site of an older Visigothic cathedral and a later mosque. The cloister was built in the 14th century. In the next century, designs for the church were pursued by Martín de Solorzano and Pedro de Ybarra. The nave has Gothic tracery, while the facades and doorways show Renaissance decoration. The church suffered from the 1755 Lisbon earthquake, when its belltower fell.
