= Mondoñedo Cathedral =

Cathedral in Mondoñedo, Spain

Coordinates: 43.4282°N 7.3628°W

- Catedral de Mondoñedo
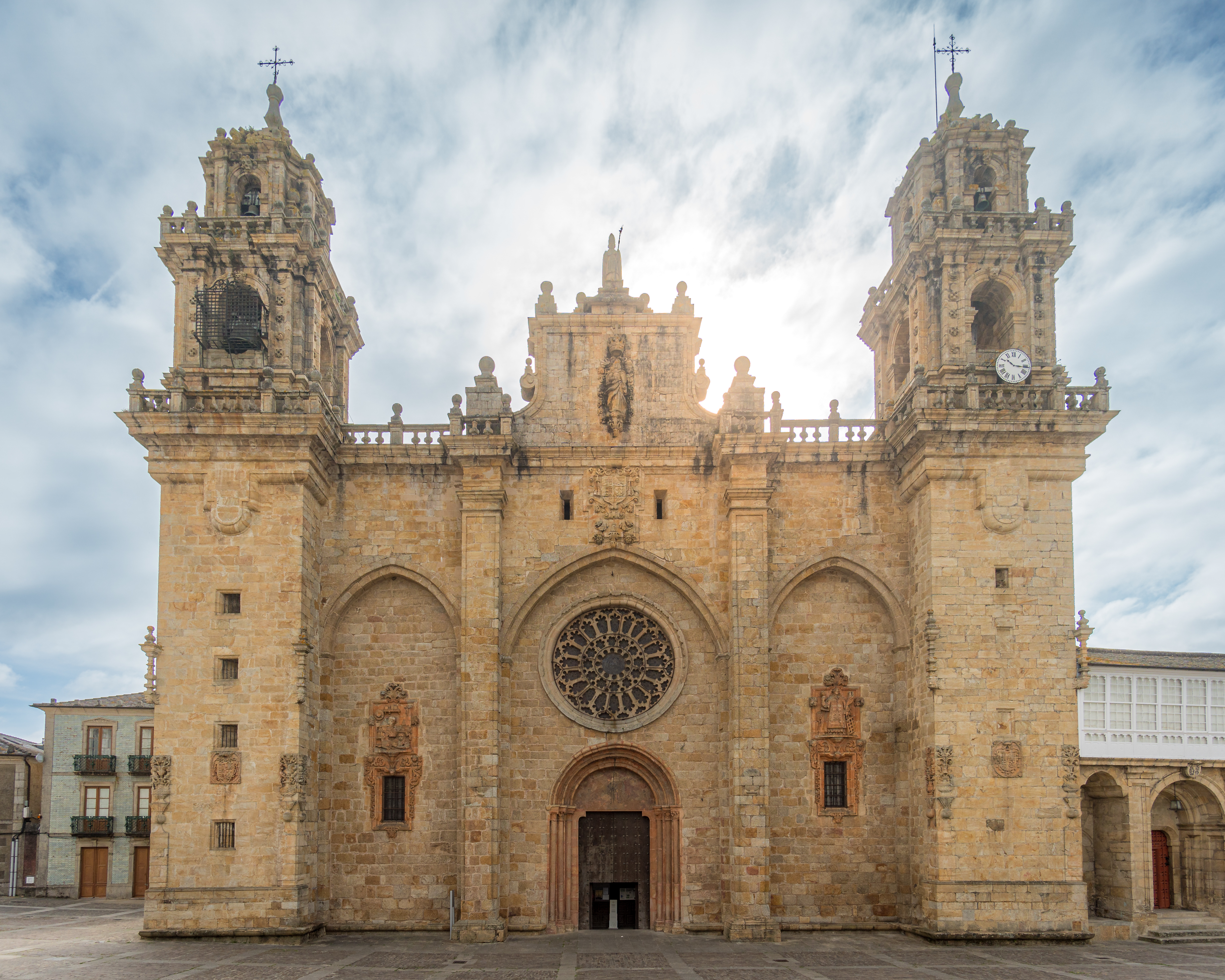

Religion
- Affiliation: Roman Catholic
- Ecclesiastical or organizational status: Cathedral
- Year consecrated: 1248

Location
- Location: Mondoñedo (Lugo), Spain
- Interactive map of Mondoñedo Cathedral

Architecture
- Style: Romanesque, Gothic, Baroque
- Direction of façade: West
- UNESCO World Heritage Site
- Type: Cultural
- Criteria: ii, iv, vi
- Designated: 2015 (32nd session)
- Parent listing: Routes of Santiago de Compostela: Camino Francés and Routes of Northern Spain
- Reference no.: 669bis-015
- Region: Europe and North America
- Spanish Cultural Heritage
- Type: Non-movable
- Criteria: Monument
- Designated: 23 May 1902
- Reference no.: RI-51-0000080

The Cathedral of Mondoñedo is a Roman Catholic cathedral located in the town of Mondoñedo, in the region of Galicia, Spain. It features a combination of Romanesque, Gothic and Baroque architectural styles, with most of the structure being built in the 13th century.

== History ==
In the sixth century, following the Anglo-Saxon invasion of Britain, a group of monks settled in the north of the Suebi Kingdom and founded the bishopric of Britonia. Due to its proximity to the sea, the bishopric was vulnerable to Viking attacks, prompting its relocation to the current site around 1112.

Construction of the Romanesque cathedral began in 1219, and it was consecrated in 1248. In the 15th century, the old wooden roofs were replaced by stone ribbed vaults. The following century saw the addition of a Gothic rose window to the façade, measuring 5 metres in diameter with polychrome stained-glass panels.

In the 18th century, the upper part of the façade was remodeled in Baroque style, incorporating two symmetrical towers, a balustrade and a frontispiece, giving the cathedral its present appearance.

It was declared a national monument in 1902.

== Notable people ==
- Ramón González Barrón (1897–1987), served as choirmaster at Mondoñedo Cathedral from 1921 to 1926.
