= Juan José Arbolí y Acaso =

- Bishop of Cádiz y Ceuta
- Church: Catholic Church
- Diocese: Diocese of Cádiz y Ceuta
- In office: 22 December 1853 – 1 February 1863
- Predecessor: Domingo de Silos Santiago Apollinario Moreno
- Successor: Félix María Arrieta y Llano
- Previous post: Bishop of Guadix (1852-1853)

Orders
- Consecration: 5 September 1852 by Judas José Romo y Gamboa

Personal details
- Born: 29 October 1795 Cádiz, Kingdom of Seville, Kingdom of Spain
- Died: 1 February 1863 (aged 67)

Juan José Arbolí y Acaso (29 October 1795 – 1 February 1863) was a Spanish priest, writer and essayist. He was bishop of Guadix and Cádiz as well as a professor of philosophy at the San Felipe Neri school; he has a street named after him in Cadiz.

He studied Philosophy and Theology at the seminary Council of San Bartolomé de Cádiz and gained a doctorate in civil and canon law from the University of Seville.

In 1859 Queen Isabel II named him Senator for Life of the Kingdom and preacher of its royal chapel.

In philosophy, he rejected the theories of Étienne Bonnot de Condillac and Antoine Destutt de Tracy, preferring those of Pierre Laromiguière.

== Main works ==
- Compendium of the Philosophy lessons taught at the College of Humanities of San Felipe Nery de Cádiz
- Tratado de Filosofía (Discourse on Philosophy)
- Gramática general (General Grammar)
- Exposición a su Majestad la Reina sobre circulares del Gobierno referentes a la censura eclesiástica y a la predicación. ((in English): Exposition to Her Majesty the Queen on government circulars relating to ecclesiastical censorship and preaching).
