= The Good Shepherd (Murillo) =

Painting by Bartolomé Esteban Murillo

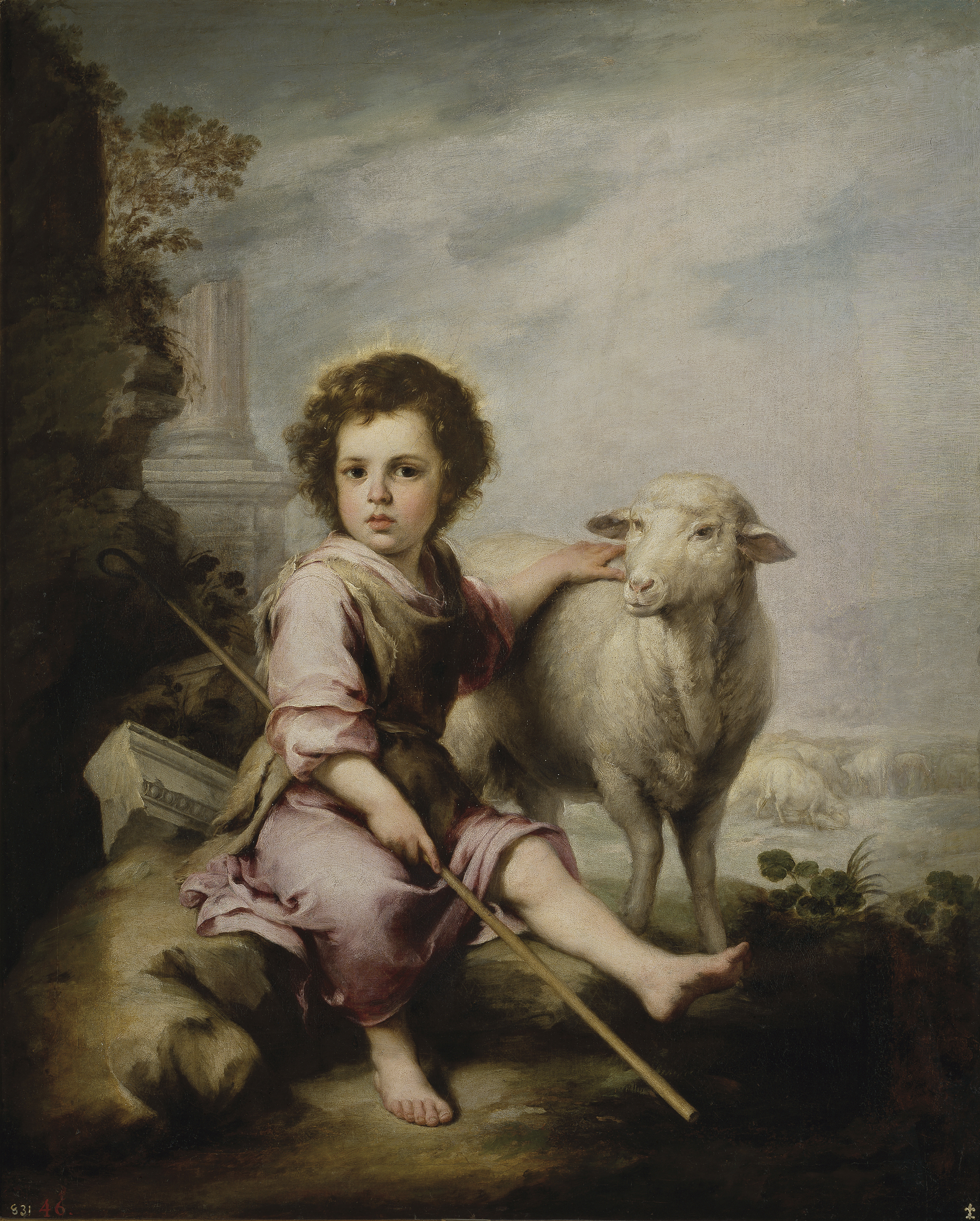
The Good Shepherd (c. 1660) by Bartolomé Esteban Murillo

The Good Shepherd is an oil on canvas painting by Bartolomé Esteban Murillo, from c. 1660. It is held in the Prado Museum, in Madrid. It has the Inventory number P00962

It and other works were bought in 1744 from the heirs of cardinal Gaspar de Molina y Oviedo by Elisabeth Farnese.

== Bibliography (in Spanish) ==
- Esteban Lorente, Juan Francisco (1990). Tratado de Iconografía. Madrid: Istmo. ISBN 84-7090-224-5.
- Martínez, María José. «Su vida y su época». Murillo. Los Genios de la Pintura. Valencia: Edicicones Rayuela. ISBN 84-7915-082-3.
- Montoto, Santiag (1932). Murillo. Barcelona: Ediciones Hymsa.
- Morales Martín, José Luis (2000). «Escuela Española». El Prado. Colecciones de Pintura. Lumwerg Editores. ISBN 84-9785-127-7.
- Morales, Nicolás; Quiles García, Fernando (2010). Sevilla y corte: las artes y el lustro real (1729-1733). Madrid: Casa de Velázquez. ISBN 978-84-9682-035-7.
- Triadó, Manuel (2001). La Pintura Española. Tomo: El siglo de Oro. Arte Carroggio. ISBN 84-7254-364-1.
- Valdivieso, Enrique (1992). Historia de la pintura sevillana. Sevilla: Guadalquivir. ISBN 84-8608-076-2.
- Valdivieso, Enrique (2010). Murillo. Catálogo razonado de pinturas. Madrid : El Viso. ISBN 978-84-95241-77-1.
