= Pere Tena Garriga =

Pere Tena i Garriga
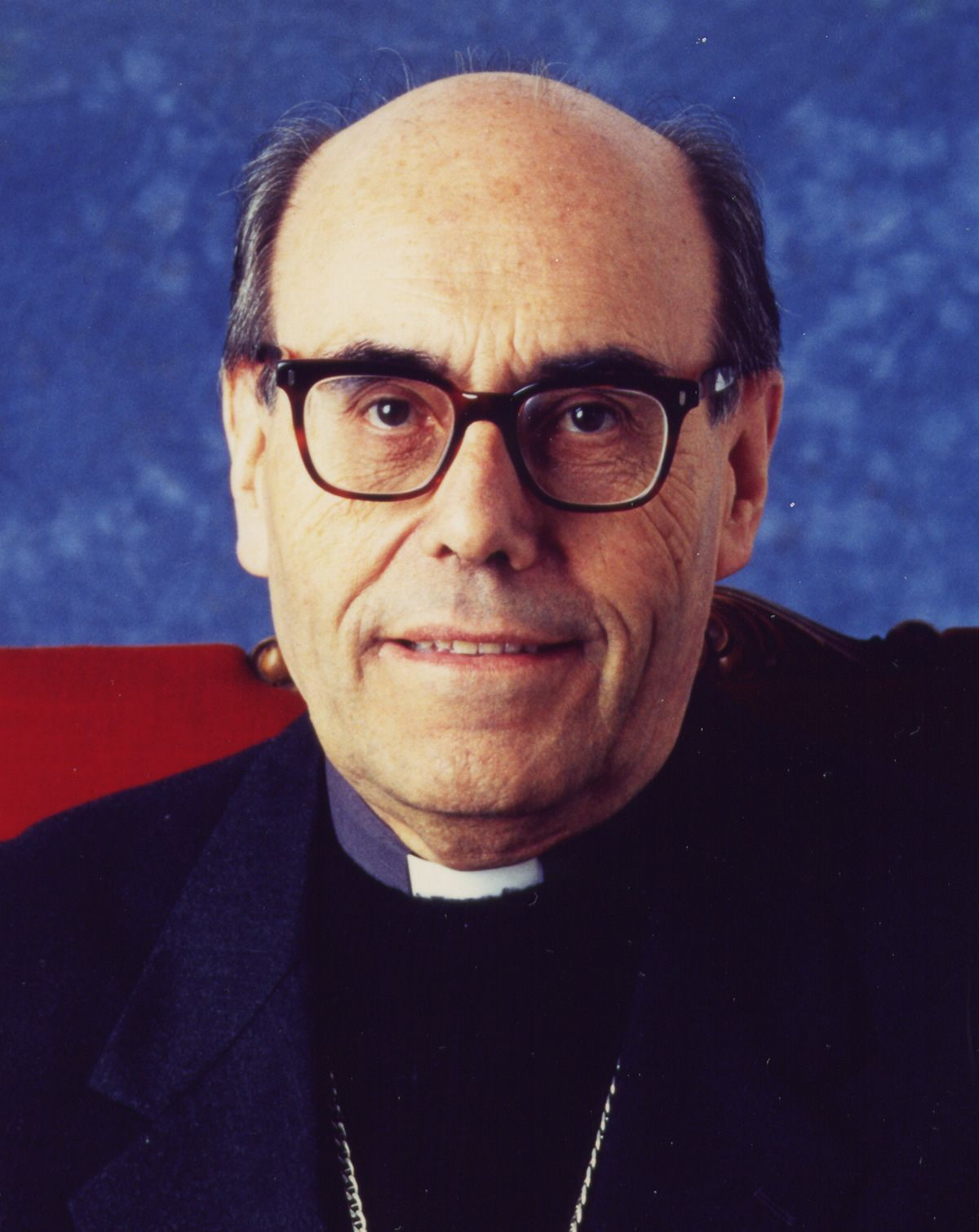
- Born: 14 May 1928; L'Hospital de Llobregat
- Died: 10 February 2014 (aged 85); Barcelona

Pere Tena i Garriga (L'Hospitalet de Llobregat, 14 May 1928 - Barcelona, 10 February 2014), Catalan bishop, was an auxiliary bishop emeritus of Barcelona and a specialist in liturgical pastoral care.

== Biography ==
He studied ecclesiastical studies at the Conciliar Seminary of Barcelona (1940-1959) and Pontifical Theology at the Pontifical Gregorian University of Rome (1950-1954). He was ordained a priest on July 29, 1951 in Barcelona, a diocese where he developed much of his priestly and episcopal ministry.

He worked as a coadjutor in the parishes of Horta and Gràcia, both in Barcelona (1954-1958), was a professor at the Conciliar Seminary of Barcelona (1956-1967) and at the Faculty of Theology of Catalonia he was a professor (1967-1998), dean (1967- 1972) and president (1973-1976, 1979-1985). He joined the Unió Sacerdotal de Barcelona association where he met Manuel Bonet i Muixí, Casimir Martí i Martí, Ramón Buxarrais Ventura, Ramon Daumal i Serra, Joan Batlles i Alerm and Josep Maria Rovira Belloso, among others.

Recognized authority in the field of liturgy, he was the promoter and president of the Center of Pastoral Liturgy of Barcelona (in two stages, between 1958-1973 and 1982-1987) which had a great influence on the implementation of the reform promoted by the Vatican Council II en Catalonia, Spain and Latin America. He was also the director of the journal of the liturgical pastoral Phase (1960-1987), a reference international publication in this field. He held the position of consultant to the Episcopal Commission for Liturgy (1962-1987), diocesan delegate for Sacramental and Liturgical Pastoral Care (1973-1983) and director of the Institut Superior de Litúrgia de Barcelona (1985-1987). The Roman Curia appointed him a consultant to the Secretariat for the Union of Christians (1983-1993) and undersecretary of the Congregation for Divine Worship and the Discipline of the Sacraments (1987-1993), of which he was a member from 1994 to 1998.

Pope John Paul II appointed him titular bishop of Cerenza and auxiliary of Barcelona on June 9, 1993, to assist in the work of Archbishop Ricard Maria Carles at the head of the archdiocese of Barcelona. He was consecrated bishop on September 5 of the same year by Archbishop Charles.

At the Spanish Episcopal Conference he was a member (1993-1996) and president (1996-2002) of the Episcopal Commission on Liturgy and a member of the Episcopal Commission on Interfaith Relations (1993-1996).

In 2001 he was awarded an honorary doctorate by the Pontifical Liturgical Institute of St. Anselm in Rome.

He became Auxiliary Bishop Emeritus of Barcelona on June 15, 2004.
