= Diocese of Cádiz y Ceuta =

Roman Catholic diocese in Spain

Coordinates: 36.5291°N 6.2953°W

Diocese of Cádiz y Ceuta Dioecesis Gadicensis o Gaditanus et Septensis Diócesis de Cádiz y Ceuta

Catholic
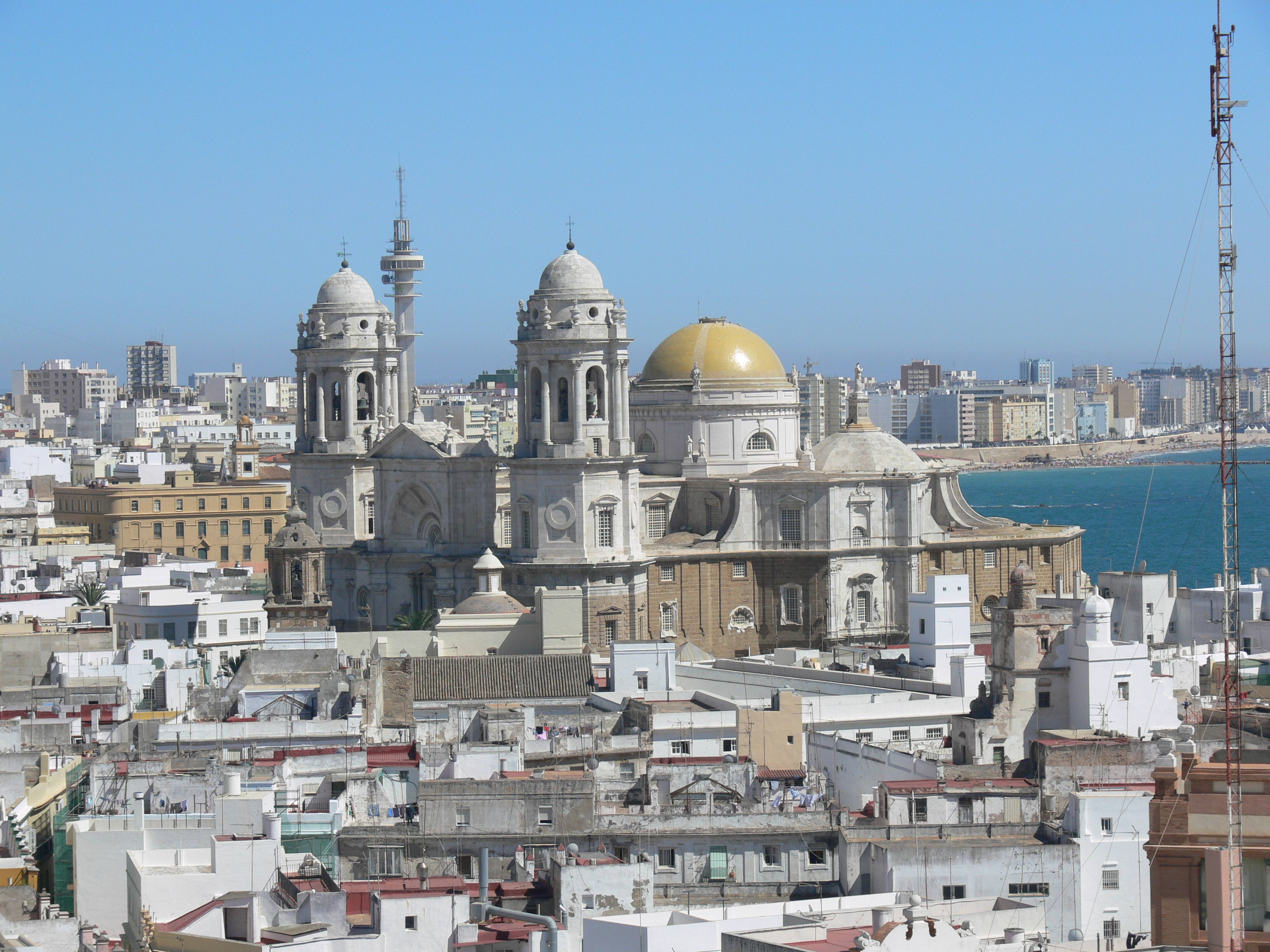
- Cádiz Cathedral

Location
- Country: Spain
- Ecclesiastical province: Seville
- Metropolitan: Seville

Statistics
- Area: 3,772 km^{2} (1,456 sq mi)
- Population: Total; Catholics: (as of 2012); 769,800; 703,400 (91.4%)
- Parishes: 118

Information
- Denomination: Catholic
- Sui iuris church: Latin Church
- Rite: Roman Rite
- Established: 5 February 1241 (As Diocese of Cádiz); 5 September 1851 (As Diocese of Cádiz y Ceuta)
- Cathedral: Cathedral of the Assumption of Our Lady in Cádiz

Current leadership
- Pope: Leo XIV
- Bishop: Vacant
- Metropolitan Archbishop: José Ángel Saiz Meneses
- Bishops emeritus: Rafael Zornoza

Map

Website
- www.obispadodecadizyceuta.org

The Diocese of Cádiz and Ceuta (Latin: Dioecesis Gadicensis o Gaditanus et Septensis) is a Latin Church diocese of the Catholic Church in Spain. The diocese is a suffragan of the Archdiocese of Seville.

Its jurisdiction covers the civil province of Cádiz south to Guadalete river. Includes the comarcas Campo de Gibraltar, La Janda and Bahía de Cádiz except most of Puerto de Santa María which is north to the mentioned Guadalete river and so belongs to diocese of Jerez de la Frontera. Valdelagrana neighbourhood of El Puerto de Santa María, as it south the River also is included in Cádiz diocese. It also covers the Spanish Autónomous City of Ceuta.

Cádiz is the residence of the bishop.

== History ==
Cádiz was raised by Urban IV to episcopal rank in 1263 at the request of king Alfonso X, a year after its Reconquista on the Moors. Its first bishop was Fray Juan Martinez. After the Christians had won from the Moors the Plaza (stronghold) de Algeciras, the ordinaries of Cádiz bore the title of Bishop of Cádiz and Algeciras, granted by Clement VI in 1352.

The see counted amongst its prelates in 1441 Cardinal Juan de Torquemada, an eminent Dominican theologian jurisconsult, who took a leading part in the Council of Basle and Council of Florence, and defended in his "Summe de Ecclesiâ" the direct power of the pope in temporal matters.

On 1816.01.25, the bishopric lost territory to establish the Apostolic Vicariate of Gibraltar, which had become a British colony.

By the Concordat of 1851, the diocese of Ceuta, also suffragan of Seville, was joined with that of Cádiz, whose bishop was regularly Apostolic Administrator of Ceuta until the present dual name was adopted at the incorporation of Ceuta in 1933.

== Leadership since 1525 ==
Bishops of Cádiz

- Juan de Torquemada, O.P. (27 Jul 1440 – 11 Jul 1442 Appointed, Bishop of Orense)

. . .

- Pedro Fernández de Solís (15 Jun 1472 – 1495 Died)

. . .

- Luigi d'Aragona (10 Feb 1511 – 6 Jun 1511 Appointed, Administrator of León)
- Pietro de Accolti de Aretio (6 Jun 1511 – 24 Jul 1521 Resigned)
- Benedetto de Accolti (24 Jul 1521 – 16 Mar 1523 Appointed, Bishop of Cremona)
- Jerónimo Teodoli (6 Sep 1525 – 16 Oct 1564 Resigned)
- Luis García Haro de Sotomayor (25 Oct 1564 – 7 Aug 1587 Appointed, Bishop of Málaga)
- Antonio Zapata y Cisneros (17 Aug 1587 – 13 May 1596 Appointed, Bishop of Pamplona)
- Maximilian of Austria (23 Sep 1596 – 27 Aug 1601 Appointed, Bishop of Segovia)
- Gómez Suárez Figueroa (26 Jun 1602 – 1612 Died)
- Juan Cuenca (20 Aug 1612 – 1623 Died)
- Plácido Pacheco de Haro, O.S.B. (20 Mar 1623 – 18 Jul 1633 Appointed, Bishop of Plasencia)
- Domingo Cano de Haro, O.P. (8 Aug 1633 – 1639 Died)
- Juan Dionisio Fernández Portocarrero (16 Jul 1640 – 27 Nov 1641 Died)
- Francisco Guerra (bishop), O.F.M. (16 Jun 1642 – 3 Apr 1656 Confirmed, Bishop of Plasencia)
- Fernando de Quesada (28 Aug 1656 – 8 May 1662 Died)
- Alfonso Pérez de Humanares, O. Cist. (12 Feb 1663 – 23 Jun 1663 Died)
- Alfonso Vázquez de Toledo, O.F.M. (26 Nov 1663 – 30 Dec 1672 Died)
- Diego de Castrillo (28 May 1673 – 16 Nov 1676 Appointed, Archbishop of Zaragoza)
- Juan de Isla (8 Mar 1677 – 23 Sep 1680 Appointed, Archbishop of Burgos)
- Antonio Ibarra (18 Nov 1680 – 1691 Died)
- José de Barcia y Zambrana (27 Aug 1691 – 30 Nov 1695 Died)
- Ildefonso de Talavera, O.S.Io.Hieros. (18 Jul 1696 – Dec 1714 Died)
- Lorenzo Armengual del Pino de la Mota (6 May 1715 – 15 May 1730 Died)
- Tomás del Valle, O.P. (12 Feb 1731 – Feb 1776 Died)
- Juan Bautista Cervera, O.F.M. Disc. (12 May 1777 – 11 Jan 1781 Died)
- José Escalzo y Miguel, O.S.B. (18 Jul 1783 – 17 Mar 1790 Died)
- Antonio Martínez de la Plaza (29 Nov 1790 – Oct 1800 Died)
- Francisco Javier Utrera (23 Feb 1801 – 27 Dec 1808 Died)
- Juan Acisclo de Vera y Delgado (15 Mar 1815 – 22 Jul 1818 Died)
- Francisco Javier de Cienfuegos y Jovellanos (4 Jun 1819 – 20 Dec 1824 Confirmed, Archbishop of Sevilla)
- Domingo de Silos Santiago Apollinario Moreno, O.S.B. (21 Mar 1825 – 9 Mar 1853 Died)
- Juan José Arbolí y Acaso (22 Dec 1853 – 1 Feb 1863 Died)
- Félix María Arrieta y Llano, O.F.M. Cap. (1 Oct 1863 – 17 Feb 1879 Resigned)
- Jaime Catalá y Albosa (28 Feb 1879 – 9 Aug 1883 Confirmed, Bishop of Barcelona)
- Vicente Calvo y Valero (27 Mar 1884 – 27 Jun 1898 Died)
- José María Rancés y Villanueva (28 Nov 1898 – 14 Jun 1917 Died)
- Marcial López y Criado (18 May 1918 – 15 Feb 1932 Died)

Bishops of Cádiz y Ceuta

- Ramón Pérez y Rodríguez (12 Apr 1933 – 28 Jan 1937 Died)
- Tomás Gutiérrez Díez (10 Jun 1943 – 2 Apr 1964 Died)
- Antonio Añoveros Ataún (2 Apr 1964 – 3 Dec 1971 Appointed, Bishop of Bilbao)
- Antonio Dorado Soto (1 Sep 1973 – 26 Mar 1993 Appointed, Bishop of Málaga)
- Antonio Ceballos Atienza (10 Dec 1993 – 30 Aug 2011 Retired)
- Rafael Zornoza Boy (30 Aug 2011 – 22 November 2025)

Auxiliary Bishops of Cádiz

- Pedro Xague (1560) Appointed, Diocese of Nisyros
- Jerónimo Clavijo (1564) Appointed, Diocese of Nisyros

== Churches ==
- Ermita del Cerro de los Mártires
- Iglesia conventual del Carmen (San Fernando)
- Iglesia de la Divina Pastora (San Fernando)
