= Vicente Acero =

Spanish Baroque architect

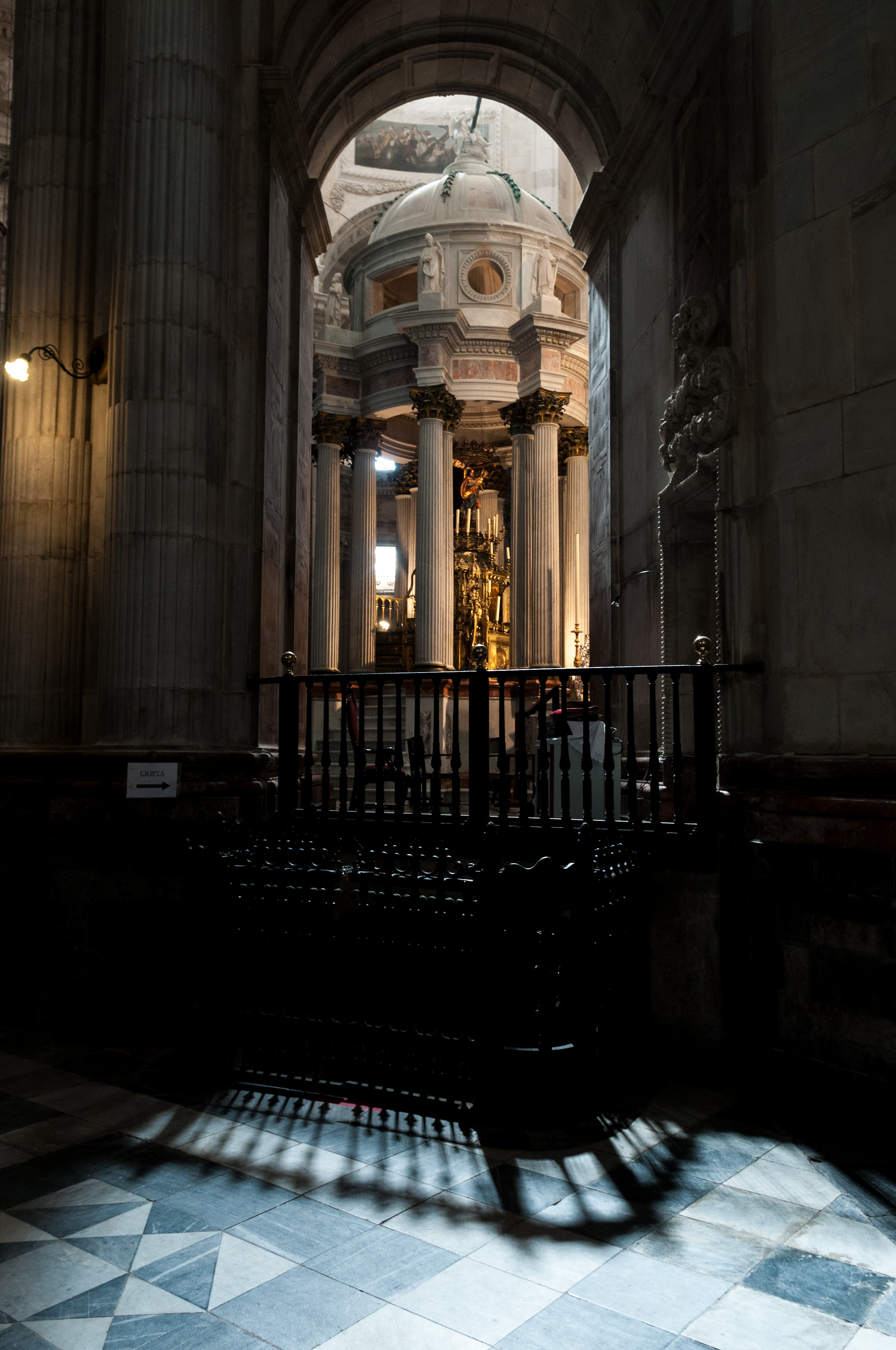
Cádiz Cathedral (in Spanish: Catedral de Cádiz or Catedral de Santa Cruz de Cádiz) is a Roman Catholic church in Cádiz, southern Spain. It was built between 1722 and 1838. It was declared Bien de Interés Cultural in 1931. The Plaza de la Catedral houses both the Cathedral and the Baroque Santiago church, built in 1635. The church sits on the site of an older cathedral, completed in 1260, which burned down in 1596. The reconstruction, which was not started until 1776, was supervised by the architect Vicente Acero, who had also built the Granada Cathedral. Acero left the project and was succeeded by several other architects. As a result, this largely baroque-style cathedral was built over a period of 116 years, and, due to this drawn-out period of construction, the cathedral underwent several major changes to its original design. Though the cathedral was originally intended to be a baroque edifice, it contains rococo elements, and was finally completed in the neoclassical style. Its chapels have many paintings and relics from the old cathedral and monasteries from throughout Spain. In the crypt are buried the composer Manuel de Falla and the poet and playwright José María Pemán, both born in Cádiz. Poniente Tower, one of the towers of Cádiz Cathedral, is open to the public and shows panoramas of the city from the high.

Vicente Acero y Arebo (c. 1675/1680 – 1739) was a Spanish Baroque architect who contributed significantly to the design and construction of the cathedrals of Granada, Guadix, Cádiz, and Málaga.

He was born in Cabárceno, Cantabria, approximately 1675 or 1680, and learned architecture from Francisco Hurtado Izquierdo (1669–1725). He worked in various capacities on cathedrals in the style of Diego de Siloe, whom he praised greatly in writing.

Besides his work on the cathedrals of Granada, Guadix, Cádiz, and Málaga, he also designed the palace of the Dukes of Medinaceli by the Puerto de Santa María in Cádiz (1724), the shrine of the charterhouse of Santa Maria de El Paular in Rascafría, Community of Madrid, and the collegiate church of San Sebastián in Antequera (1738).

He died in Seville in 1739, where he was participating in the design of the Royal Tobacco Factory.
