= Antonio Ceballos Atienza =

Spanish bishop (1935–2022)

The Most Reverend Antonio Ceballos Atienza
- Bishop Emeritus of Cádiz y Ceuta
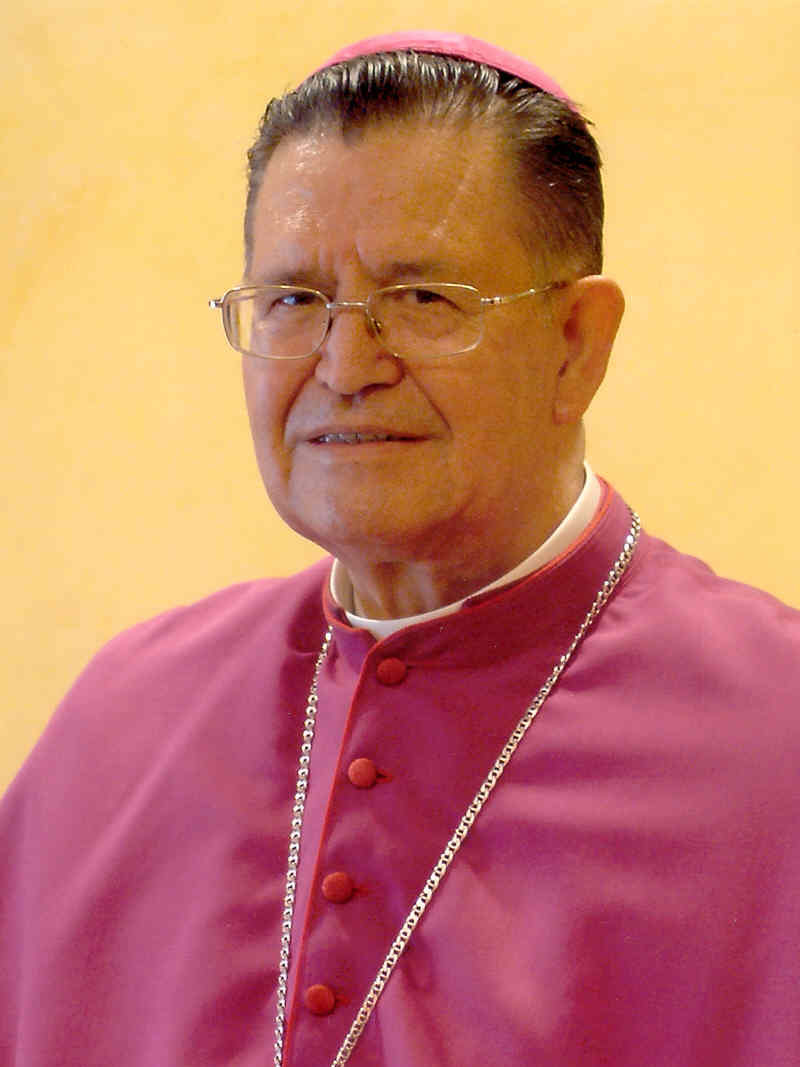
- Archdiocese: Sevilla
- Appointed: 10 December 1993
- Term ended: 30 August 2011
- Predecessor: Antonio Dorado Soto
- Successor: Rafael Zornoza Boy
- Previous post: Bishop of Ciudad Rodrigo (1988–1993)

Orders
- Ordination: 29 June 1961
- Consecration: 25 March 1988 by Mario Tagliaferri

Personal details
- Born: 31 July 1935 Alcalá la Real, Spain
- Died: 31 March 2022 (aged 75) Jaén, Spain
- Motto: IN OMNIBUS CARITAS
- Coat of arms

Styles of Antonio Ceballos Atienza
- Reference style: His Excellency; The Most Reverend
- Spoken style: Your Excellency
- Religious style: Bishop

Antonio Ceballos Atienza (31 July 1935 – 21 September 2022) was a Spanish Roman Catholic prelate.

Ceballos Atienza was born in Spain and was ordained to the priesthood in 1961. He served as bishop of the Roman Catholic Diocese of Ciudad Rodrigo, Spain, from 1988 to 1993 and then was the bishop of the Roman Catholic Diocese of Cádiz y Ceuta, Spain, from 1993 until his retirement in 2011.

Catholic Church titles
Preceded by Antonio Dorado Soto	Bishop of Cádiz y Ceuta; 1993–2011	Succeeded by Rafael Zornoza Boy
Preceded by Demetrio Mansilla Reoyo	Bishop of Ciudad Rodrigo; 1988–1993	Succeeded by Julián López Martín
