= Antonio Soto =

Antonio Soto may refer to:

- Tony Soto (politician) (born 1973), Puerto Rican politician
- Antonio Dorado Soto (1931–2015), Spanish Roman Catholic bishop
- Antonio Soto (syndicalist) (1897–1963), anarcho-syndicalist leader of the rural strikes in Argentine Patagonia
- Antonio Jesús Soto (born 1994), Spanish cyclist
- Antonio Soto Díaz (1949–2016), Puerto Rican politician
- Antonio Soto Sánchez (born 1961), Mexican politician
- Antonio Díaz Soto y Gama (1880–1967), Mexican politician and revolutionary
