= Pedro de Obregón =

Spanish painter and printmaker

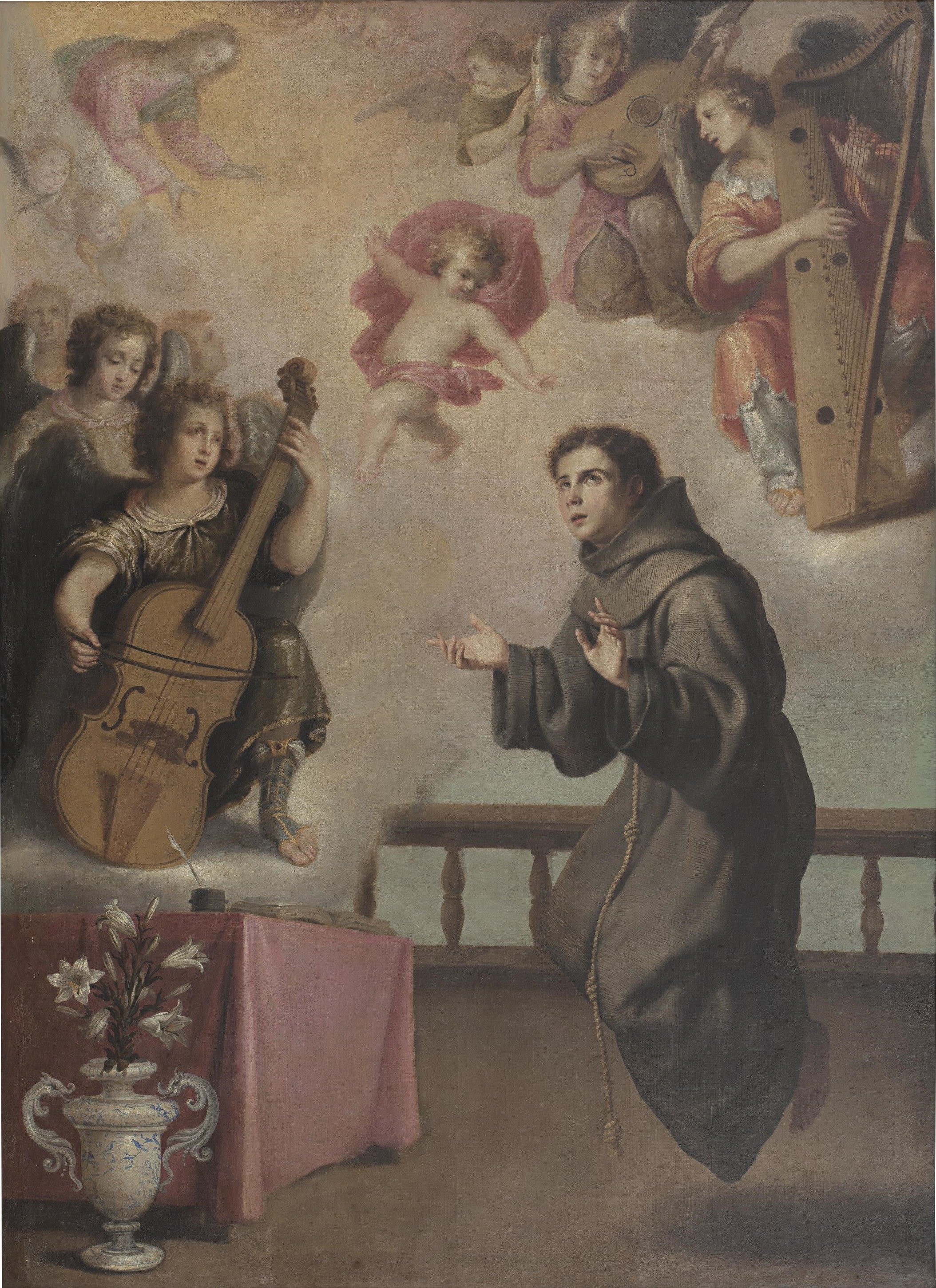
Saint Anthony of Padua

Pedro de Obregón (1597–1659) was a Spanish painter and printmaker.

According to art historian Antonio Palomino, Pedro de Obregón was initially taught by Vincenzo Carducci, and became one of his best pupils, imitating the teacher in drawing. Palomino asserts that he painted many pictures for individuals and few to the public, although some notable works include a Holy Trinity for the convent of the Merced Calzada of Madrid, and San Joaquin and Santa Ana, commissioned by the Church of Santa Cruz, also of Madrid. These pieces were lost, but one noted was the Apparition of the Infant Jesus to San Antonio dated 1633, in the convent of Santa Clara in Villacastín.

Documentation shows he also made prints, one of them a Saint Dominic in Soriano made from a drawing by Alonso Cano, and the other a small work with a woman sitting painting. There is also an etching also attributed to him that was given to Charles II and Mariana of Austria, signed P º Obregon.

He was the father of Diego de Obregón, a writer specializing in book illustration, and Marcos de Obregón, a priest who also practiced engraving but with less success.
