= Monastery of El Paular =

Carthusian monastery in Rascafría, Spain

Monastery of Santa María de El Paular
- Monasterio de Santa María de El Paular (Spanish)
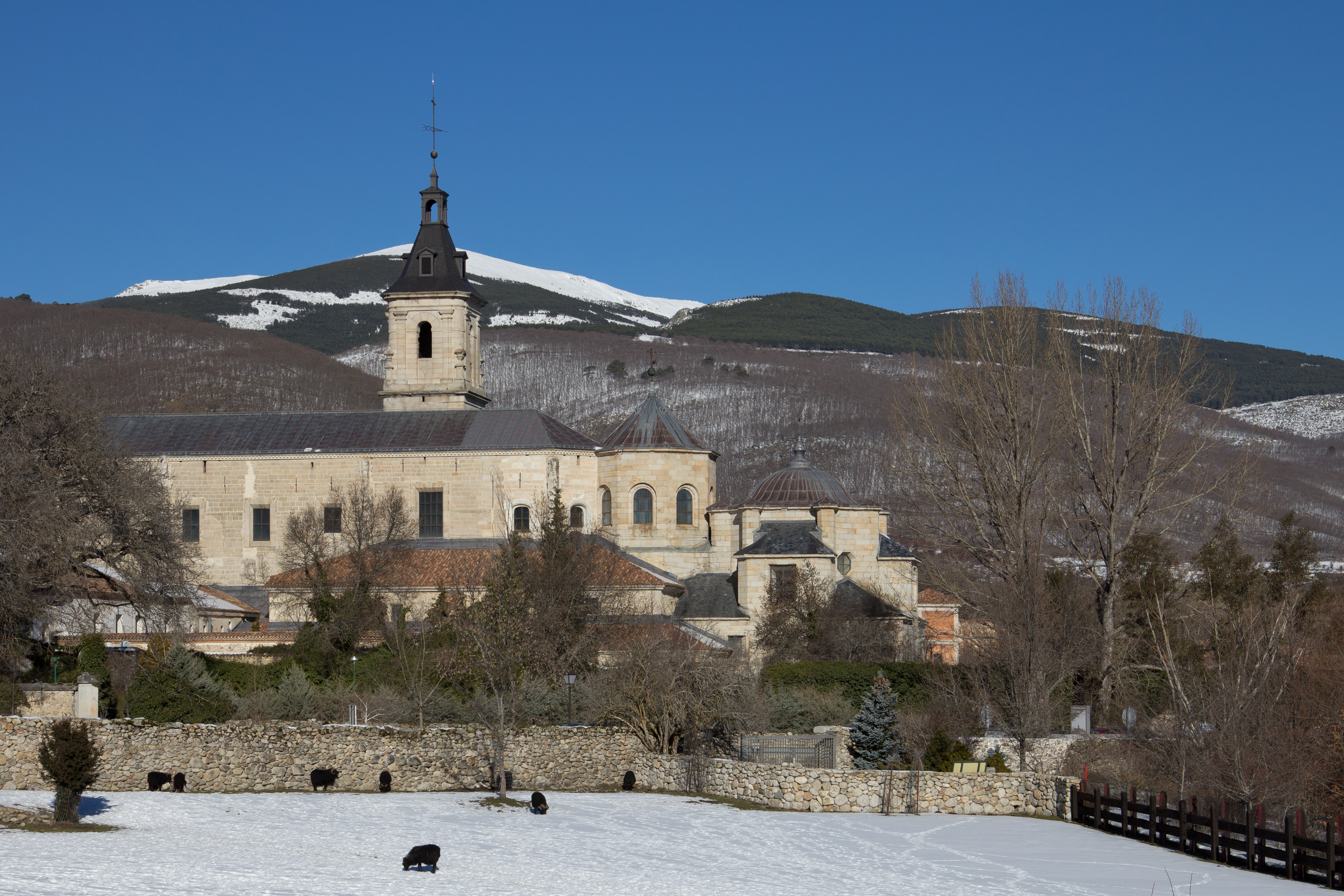

- Location within Spain
- 40.888303°N 3.887585°W
- Location: Rascafría, Spain

Spanish Cultural Heritage
- Official name: Monasterio de Santa María de El Paular
- Type: Non-movable
- Criteria: Monument
- Designated: 1876
- Reference no.: RI-51-0000015

The Monasterio de Santa María de El Paular (Santa María de El Paular Monastery) is a former Carthusian monastery (Spanish cartuja, "charterhouse") located just northwest of Madrid, in the town of Rascafría, located in the Valley of Lozoya below the Sierra de Guadarrama.

== History ==
Construction is believed to have begun in 1390 by orders of Henry II of Castile, and construction proceeded for fifty years under his son, John I of Castile. It was sited where an old chapel stood. Supposedly he was spurred to this project due to his plundering of a chartreuse during a campaign in France. This was the first chartreuse in Castille and Leon. In 1403, a small adjacent palace was built under Rodrigo Alonso. Multiple architects contributed to the complex, including Juan Guas, Rodrigo Gil de Hontañón, Francisco Hurtado and Vicente Acero. The refectory was designed in a Moorish style.

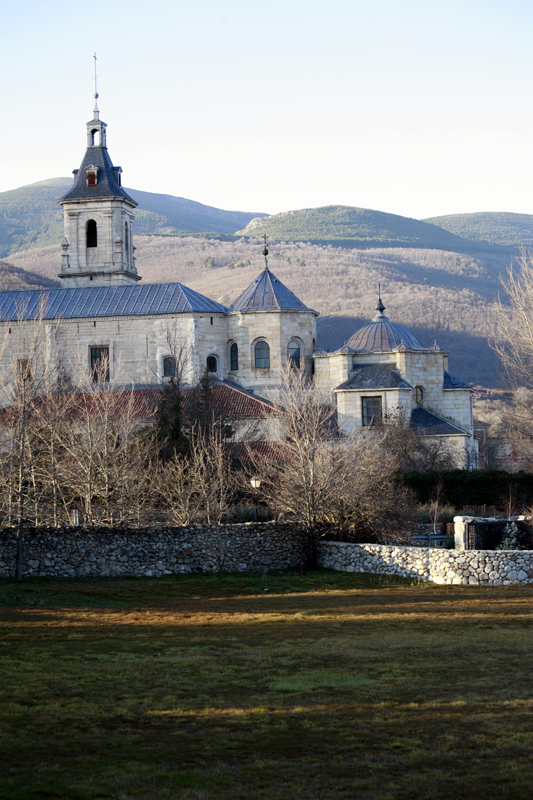
Real Monasterio de Santa María de El Paular (Madrid).

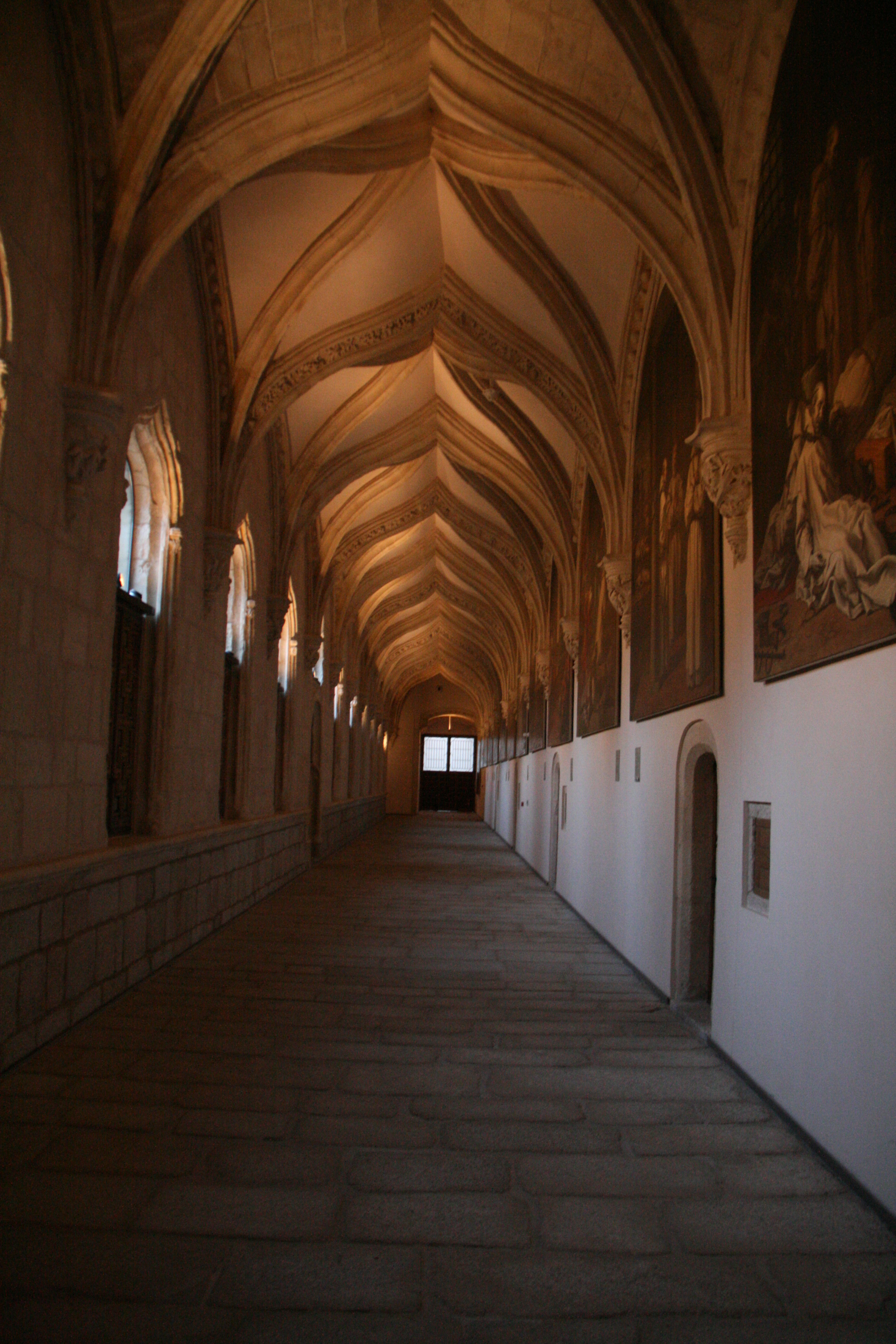
The refurbished interior of the cloister of the Chartreuse of el Paular with the paintings of Vicente Carducho.

The monastery was dissolved in 1835, and not till 1876 was some state protection afforded to the site. Since 1954, part of the monastery is occupied by the Benedictine order; while part was a private luxury hotel, operating as the Sheraton Santa Maria de El Paular, for many years, until it closed in 2014.

== Design ==
The spectacular late-Baroque decorations of the chapel of the sacristy and its Transparente (mid-18th century) by Francisco Hurtado Izquierdo and containing polychromatic marbles, solomonic columns, and gilded leafwork, contrast with the rocky serene simpleness of the cloisters. The silver decoration of the church included a silver “custodia” weighing some 24 arrobas (approximately 15 kilogram per arroba), which among with many other items, was probably looted by Napoleon's troops. There is a large 15th-century carved wood reredos in excellent condition, and a fine ironwork screen segregating the monastic choir from the nave.

== Collections ==
While it still has an interesting library, its once famous collection of books and maps has been dispersed. In 1755, an earthquake damaged the tower and nave roof. Missing from the site are 52 paintings by Vincenzo Carducci on the life of St. Bruno and other devotional incidents. The paintings are in local museums, including the Prado in Madrid. The paintings were returned to the monastery after restoration in 2011.

Parts of both monastery and hotel are open for visits by the public.
