= Center of Pastoral Liturgy of Barcelona =

Spanish religious institution

- Centre de Pastoral Litúrgica de Barcelona
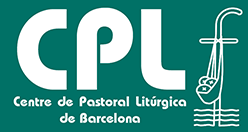
- Abbreviation: CPL
- Formation: 1958
- Type: Institution
- Legal status: institution
- Purpose: promote the liturgical aspect of the Church's pastoral action, especially through the publication of educational publications adapted to different circumstances and times
- Headquarters: Barcelona
- Location: Diputació 231, 08007 Barcelona
- Region served: Spain
- Members: 31
- Official language: Catalan
- Leader: Josep Maria Romaguera i Bach
- Website: www.cpl.es

Center of Pastoral Liturgy of Barcelona (Catalan: Centre de Pastoral Litúrgica de Barcelona; CPL) is a public association of the Christian faithful, created in 1958 in the Archdiocese of Barcelona. Its main objective is to promote the liturgical aspect of the Church's pastoral action, especially through the publication of educational publications adapted to different circumstances and times.

== Origins and history ==
Centre de Pastoral Litúrgica de Barcelona was established in 1958 as a public association of the Christian faithful, with the approval of the Bishop of Barcelona, Gregorio Modrego Casaús, although official statutes were not received until 27 December 1966. At first, CPL's offices were located in the Palau de la Balmesiana, residence, at that time, of Pere Tena and Joan Bellavista, founder members of CPL. Later, in April 1959, the first separate premises were obtained, in a room of the Episcopal Palace of Barcelona. In December 1961, the organisation moved again, this time renting an office at 29 Ronda Universitat, where it stayed for barely two months, since on 22 February 1962 a new contract was signed for an office on the first floor of 45 Carrer de la Canuda, where the CPL remained until 1980. That year the entity moved to the Santa Anna building, 6 Rivadeneyra, until 2013. The following sites have been at 346 Nàpols, until June 2021, when it moved to its current location, in the building of the Conciliar Seminary of Barcelona.

The CPL is not an official agency, but is an ecclesiastically recognised entity, governed by its own statutes and by the canonical provisions applicable at any given time. The CPL became known with a first publication, Monicions i pregàries per a la Santa Missa (Comments and prayers for the Holy Mass), which offered a simple presentation of various moments of the Eucharistic celebration for all the Sundays and feasts of the year. This book put in written form all the extensive work that had been done in Catalonia and Barcelona in those years, in line with the liturgical renewal movement that was developing throughout Europe. Three names stand out from those early days: the young Barcelona priests Pere Tena Garriga, Pere Farnés Scherer and Joan Bellavista Ramon, to whom should be added the even younger Joaquim Gomis Sanahuja and Joan Llopis Sarrió.

With the celebration of the Second Vatican Council (1961-1965), and specifically with the promulgation of the liturgical constitution Sacrosanctum Concilium (1963), the liturgical reform of the Church was initiated. This was a decisive moment in the task of the CPL, because due to a number of educational measures (talks, orientations and coaching) it became possible to implement the liturgical reform promoted by this constitution particularly in Catalonia, but also in the rest of Spain. One of the basic principles of Sacrosanctum Concilium was the participation of the laity in the liturgy of the Catholic Church.

== Publications ==
The educational task exercised by the CPL becomes a specific reality in a series of publications, both books and journals, written in Catalan and Spanish. The journals, in chronological order of appearance, are as follows:

- At the beginning of 1961 the journal Phase was born, initially focused at offering liturgical reflections and orientations, as well as materials to guide the celebrations; later it was reoriented to offer reflection and thought on liturgical matters. At the beginning it had the title of Boletín de Pastoral Litúrgica (Liturgy Pastoral Bulletin).
- In Advent 1968 the magazine Misa Dominical appeared, first in Catalan, and at the beginning of 1973 it was also published in Spanish. This magazine offers materials for direct use in the celebration, as well as guidelines for the celebration and for the homily.
- In 1970 appeared the journal Oración de las Horas, currently under the title of Liturgia y Espiritualidad. Initially it was intended to help religious communities to celebrate and live the Liturgy of the Hours; the change of title reflected a change of orientation, now focused especially on liturgical and spiritual reflection.
- Finally, in 2018 comes Galilea.153: Litúrgia, pastoral, vida cristiana. This is a publication aimed at liturgical groups in parishes and communities, as well as lay people.

In terms of books and essays, the CPL issues the following collections, many of them were started in the 1980s:

- Biblioteca Litúrgica, monographic study texts on liturgical questions.
- Dossiers CPL, a collection of theoretical and practical guidelines for celebrations.
- Celebrar, simple books with texts and guidelines for prayer and celebration.
- Cuadernos Phase, essential liturgical reference texts in the history of Christianity.
- Emaús, for the promotion of liturgy, education and Christian life in general.
- Sants i Santes, a selection of the lives of men and women of special significance in their faith.

All these editorial and educational divulgation tasks have gradually extended the CPL's scope of action beyond the Catalan and Spanish areas, and it has now achieved a notable presence in Latin American countries, and also in Hispanic communities in the United States.

== Teaching ==
In the academic field, the Center of Pastoral Liturgy of Barcelona promoted the creation of the specialised Superior Institute of Liturgy of Barcelona (ISLB), canonically established in 1986 and incorporated into the Faculty of Theology of Catalonia. In the academic year 2020-2021 the Vatican granted the ISLB the status of faculty within the framework of the University Athenaeum of Sant Pacià, now under the name of Institute of Liturgy ad instar Facultatis.

== Presidents ==
Since its foundation, the CPL has been chaired the following presidents:

- Pere Tena Garriga (1963-1973)
- Joan Bellavista Ramon (1973-1982)
- Pere Tena Garriga (1982-1987)
- Pere Farnés Scherer (1987-1990)
- José Aldazábal Larrañaga (1990-2002)
- Josep Urdeix Dordal (2002-2008)
- Jaume Fontbona Missé (2008-2017)
- Josep Maria Romaguera Bach (2017- )

== Pere Tena Memorial for Pastoral Liturgy ==
After the death of the founder Pere Tena Garriga in 2014, the Assembly of the CPL decided to establish, each year, the Pere Tena Memorial for Pastoral Liturgy, to recognise the work in this field of some entity, person or work. Since its creation in 2015, the Memorial has been awarded to:

- 2015: Abbey of Montserrat.
- 2016: Bishop Julián López Martín and Father Joan Maria Canals Casas.
- 2017: Mons. Víctor Sánchez, Archbishop of Puebla de los Ángeles (Mexico).
- 2018: Liturgy team of the parish of Santa Eulàlia de Vilapicina, in Barcelona.
- 2019: Archbishop Piero Marini.
- 2020: Father Juan Javier Floras Arcas, osb.
- 2021: Institute of Liturgy ad instar Facultatis.
- 2022: To claretian Matías Augé i Benet.
