= Iglesia de la Divina Pastora (San Fernando) =

Church in San Fernando, Cádiz, Spain

Coordinates: 36°28′6″N 6°11′35″W

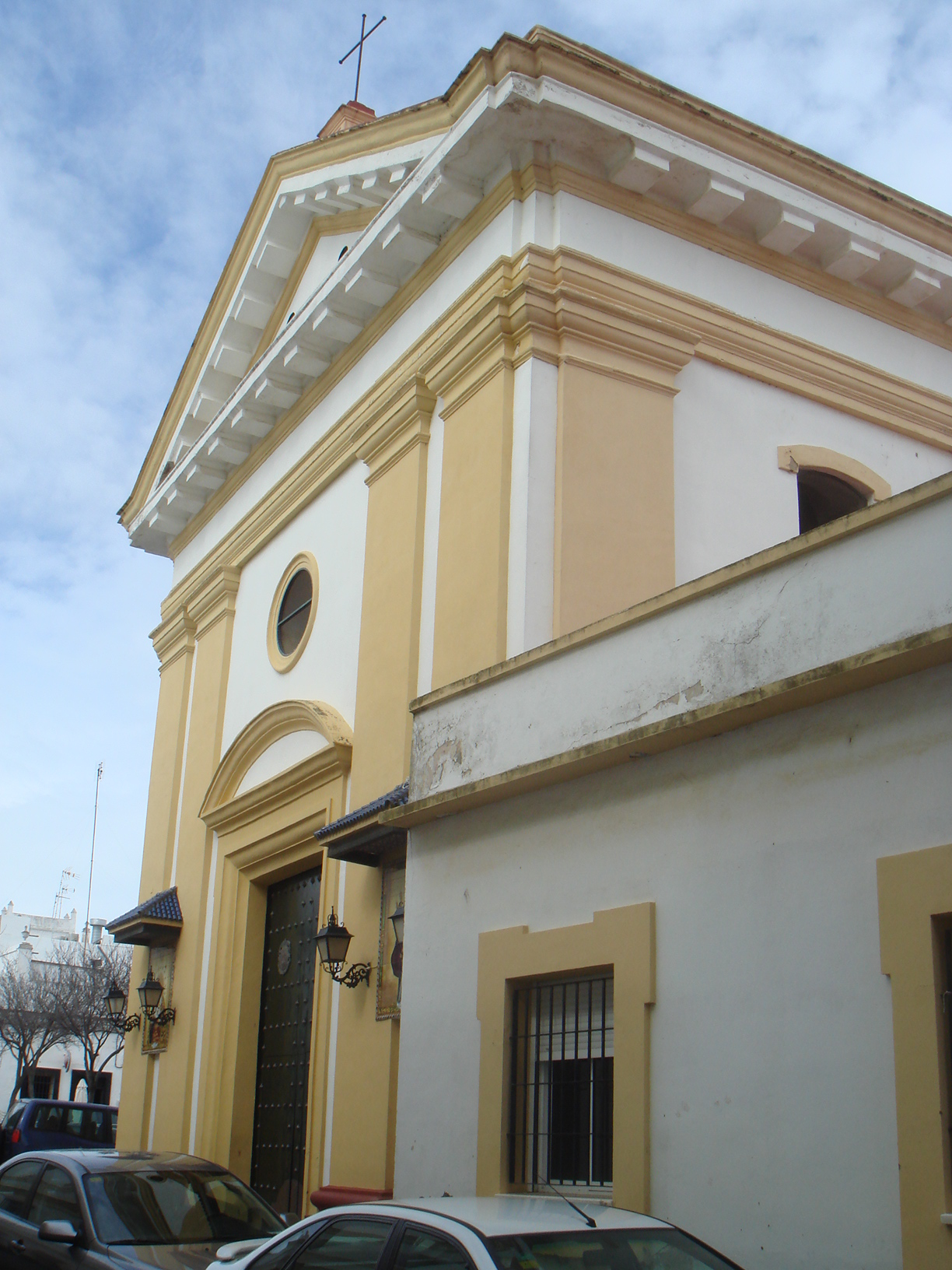

Iglesia de la Divina Pastora is a church located in San Fernando in the Province of Cádiz, Andalusia, Spain. It was built in the 18th century.

== See also ==
- Roman Catholic Diocese of Cádiz y Ceuta
