= Vincenzo Carducci =

Italian painter (1570s–1638)

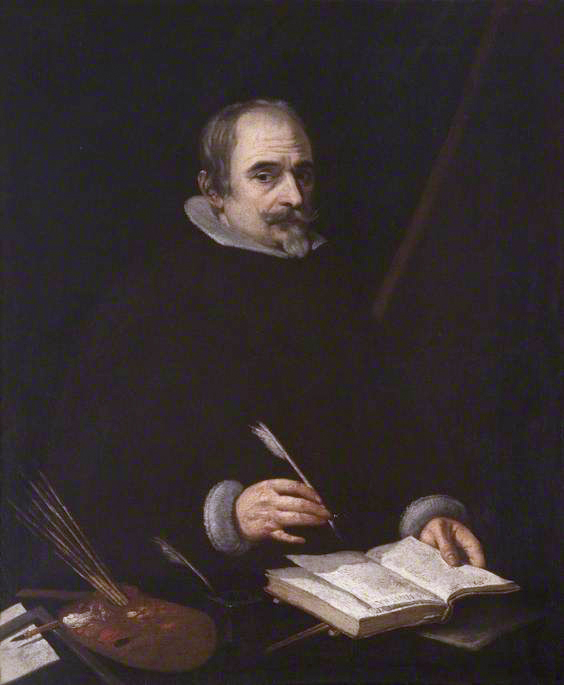
Self portrait (circa 1633–1638).

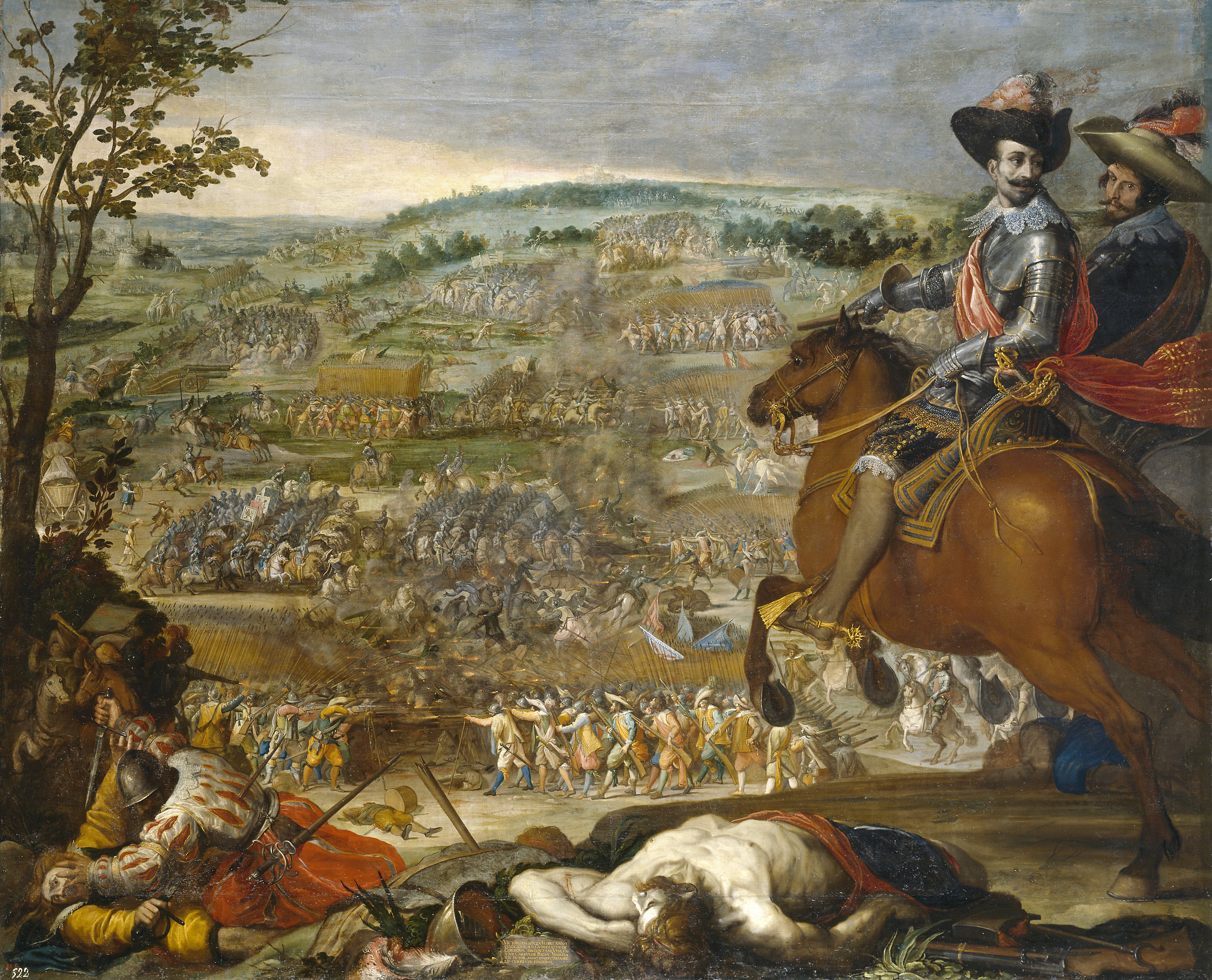
The Victory of Fleurus.

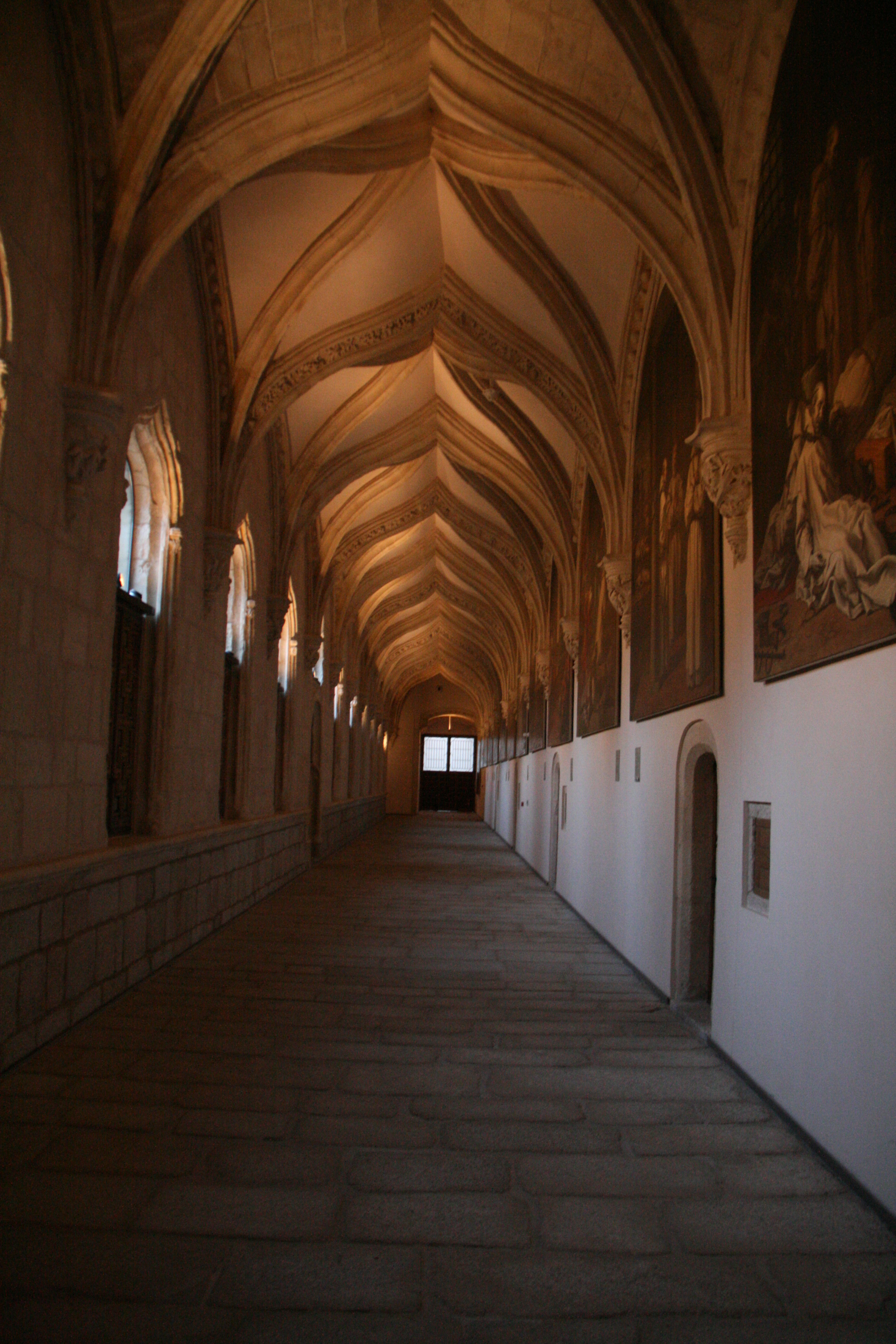
The refurbished interior of the cloister of the Chartreuse of el Paular with the paintings of Vicente Carducho.

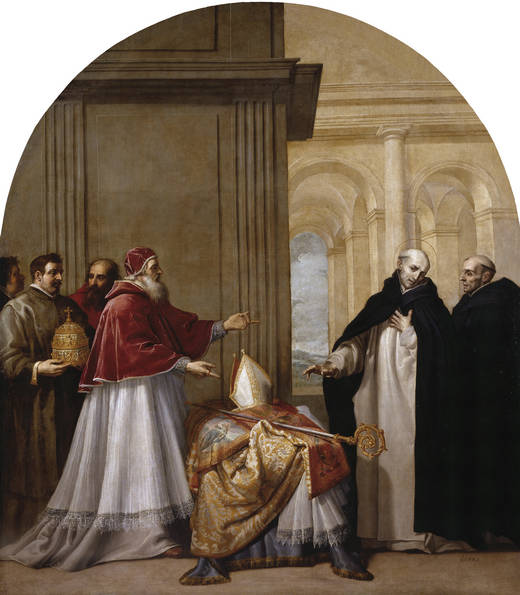
Saint Bruno refuses the archbishopric of Reggio di Calabria, by Vicente Carducho, Chartreuse of el Paular.

Vincenzio Carduccio (in Spanish, sometimes Vicencio or Vicente Carducho; 1576 or 1578–1638) was an Italian painter who spent his career in Spain.

== Education and training ==
He was born in Florence and was trained as a painter by his brother Bartolomeo Carduccio, whom he followed to Madrid as a boy. While attached to the Spanish court since about 1585, his presence in Spain is first documented in 1601.

He initially painted some works at Valladolid and helped his brother paint the Escorial for Philip II of Spain. He returned to the court of Philip III in Madrid in 1606 and helped decorate the recently rebuilt Palacio del Pardo. While at work his brother died, and Vicente took his place. He painted there a history of Achilles. When finished, he was employed for four years by the monks of the Chartreuse of el Paular to decorate their monastery with 54 canvases of historical figures in the great cloister. 27 represent the life of St. Bruno, and 27 are of martyrs.

== Work for Philip IV of Spain ==
He worked a great deal for the subsequent monarch, Philip IV of Spain and his best pictures are those he executed for him as decorations, now preserved in the Prado. Examples of his work are preserved in Toledo, Segovia, and several other Spanish cities. For many years he labored in Madrid as a teacher of his art, and among his pupils were Juan Rizi, Pedro de Obregón, Vela, Francisco Collantes, and other distinguished representatives of the Spanish school during the 17th century.

== 1633 treatise ==
He also authored a treatise De las Excelencias de la Pintura (Dialogues on painting: its defense, origin, essence, definition, styles, and differences). His treatise was published in 1633. Carducci argued that artists who wanted to be recognized as intellectuals should engage in the practices of aristocrats. He thought that decorating one's residence with paintings, books, and perhaps even sculptures, helps the pursuit of critical thinking. By the 18th century artists commonly practiced the advice given in the 1633 treatise.

The 1633 treatise is written in classical tradition as a dialogue between a master and an apprentice. Following the strict piety of the Spanish realm, the text urges:

"Shame on me and all those who rash and impudent, and without meditation and without improving our souls, in this world set out to paint a portrait of the most Holy Queen of Angels, Mother of the Almighty, she who was full of grace, she who will be our means for gaining heaven...How well this was understood by that holy monastic painter Brother Juan Fesulano..(who) never started to paint without praying first..and (who) wept whenever he painted Christ on the Cross."

Carducho also assailed the verism of practiced by some such as Velázquez, and particularly was critical of Caravaggio and his followers, on whom he wrote:

"His new dish is cooked with condiments, with so much flavor, appetite, and relish that he has surpassed everybody with such choice tidbits and a license so great that I am afraid the others will suffer apoplexy in ther true principles, because most painters follow him as if they were famished. They do not stop to reflect of the fire of his talent which is so forceful, nor whether they are able to digest such an impetuous, unheard of, and incompatible technique, nor whether they possess Caravaggio's nimbleness of painting without preparation. Did anyone ever paint, and with so much success, as this monster of genius and talent, almost without rules, without theory, without learning and meditation, solely by the power of this genius and the model in front of him which he simply copied so admirably.? I heard a zealot of our profession say that the appearance of this man mean a foreboding of ruin and end of painting, and how at the close of this visible world the Antichrist, pretending to be the real Christ with false and strange miracles and monstrous deeds would carry with him to damnation a very large number of people moved by his works which seemed so admirable (although they were in themselves deceptive, false, and without truth or permanence).

"Thus this Anti-Michelangelo with his showy and external copying of nature his admirable technique and liveliness has been able to persuade such a large number of all kinds of people that his is good painting and that his theory and practice are right, that they have turned their backs on the true manner of perpetuating themselves and on true knowledge in this matter."

== Museo del Prado ==
The largest collection of his works remain in the Museo del Prado. The Real Academia de Bellas Artes de San Fernando owns two paintings of the series made for the Basilica de San Francisco el Grande in Madrid.
