= Cádiz Cathedral =

Catholic church in Cádiz, Spain

- Cathedral of the Holy Cross over the Waters
- Catedral de la Santa Cruz sobre las Aguas
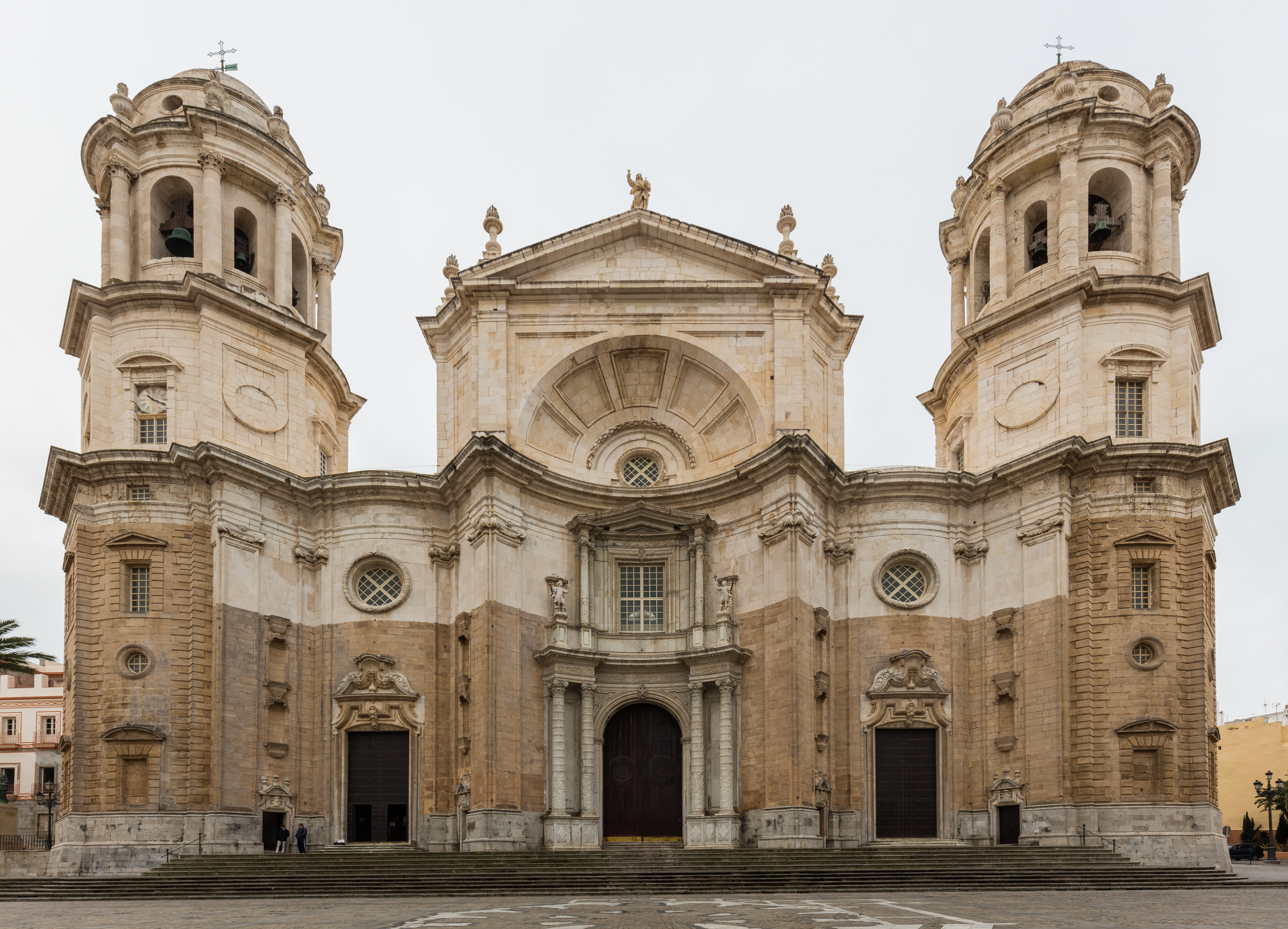
- North façade in 2015.
- Cádiz Cathedral
- 36.529135°N 6.295254°W
- Location: Cádiz
- Address: Plaza de la Catedral
- Country: Spain
- Denomination: Catholic
- Website: catedraldecadiz.com

History
- Status: Cathedral
- Dedication: Holy Cross

Architecture
- Architect(s): Vicente Acero, Gaspar Cayón and others
- Style: Baroque, Rococo, Neoclassical
- Years built: 1722—1838

Administration
- Metropolis: Seville
- Diocese: Cádiz and Ceuta

Clergy
- Bishop: Rafael Zornoza Boy

Spanish Cultural Heritage
- Type: Non-movable
- Criteria: Monument
- Designated: 3 June 1931
- Reference no.: RI-51-0000493

The Cathedral of the Holy Cross over the Waters (Spanish: Catedral de Santa Cruz sobre las Aguas) is a Catholic cathedral in Cádiz, southern Spain, and the seat of the Diocese of Cadiz y Ceuta. It was built between 1722 and 1838. The cathedral was declared Bien de Interés Cultural in 1931.

The Plaza de la Catedral houses both the Cathedral and the Baroque Santiago church, built in 1635.

The church was known as "The Cathedral of The Americas" because it was built with money from the trade between Spain and America. The 18th century was a golden age for Cádiz, and the other cathedral in the city, Santa Cruz, was very small for this new age in the history of Cádiz. The new cathedral was built from 1722 to 1838. The first person who designed the church was architect Vicente Acero, who had also built the Granada Cathedral. Acero left the project and was succeeded by several other architects. As a result, this largely baroque-style cathedral was built over a period of 116 years, and, due to this drawn-out period of construction, the cathedral underwent several major changes to its original design. Though the cathedral was originally intended to be a baroque edifice, it contains rococo elements, and was finally completed in the neoclassical style. Its chapels have many paintings and relics from the old cathedral and from monasteries throughout Spain.

The crypt is the burial place of composer Manuel de Falla and poet-playwright José María Pemán, both born in Cádiz.

Levante Tower, one of the towers of Cádiz Cathedral, is open to the public and shows panoramas of the city from on high.

== Gallery ==
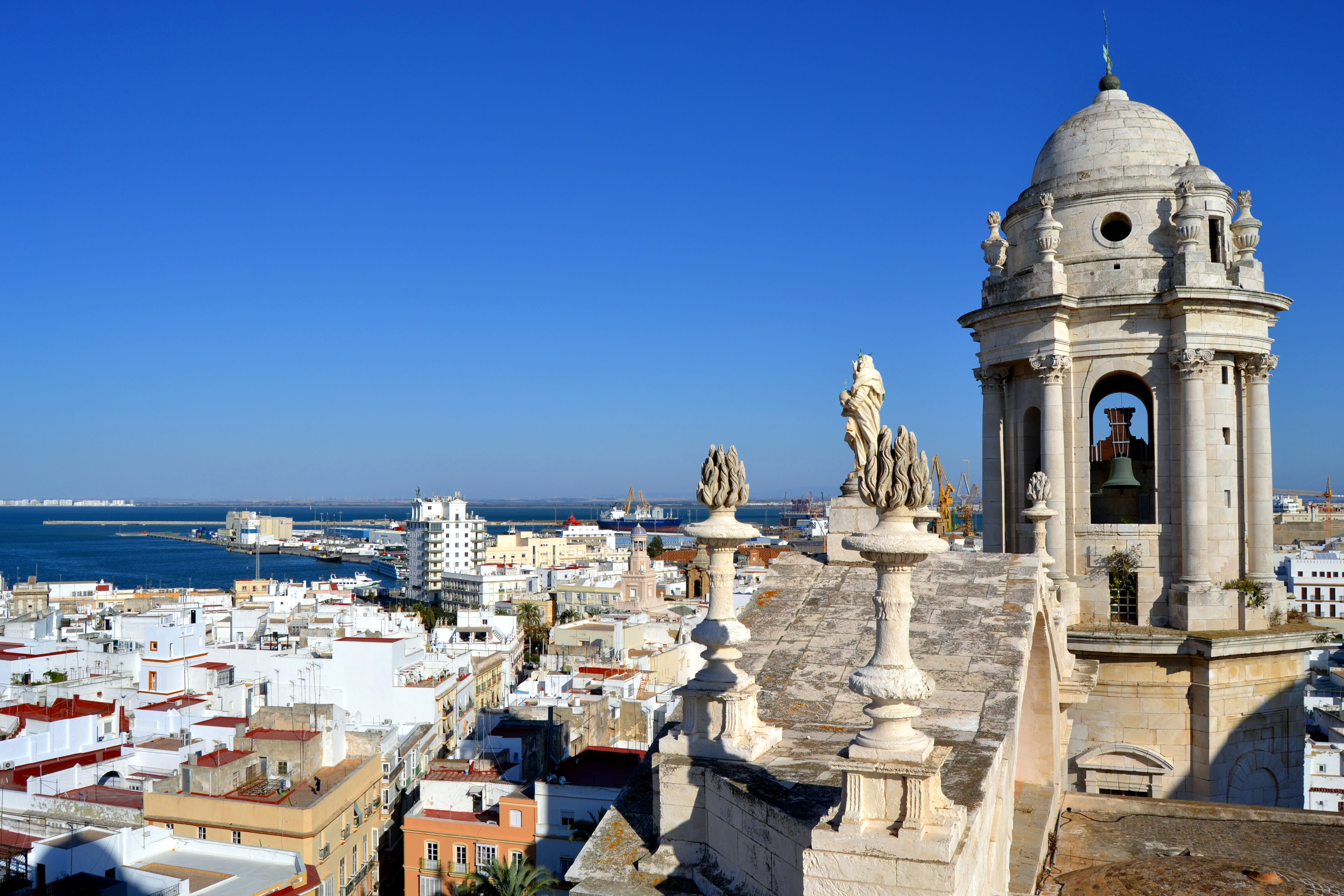
Cathedral and port

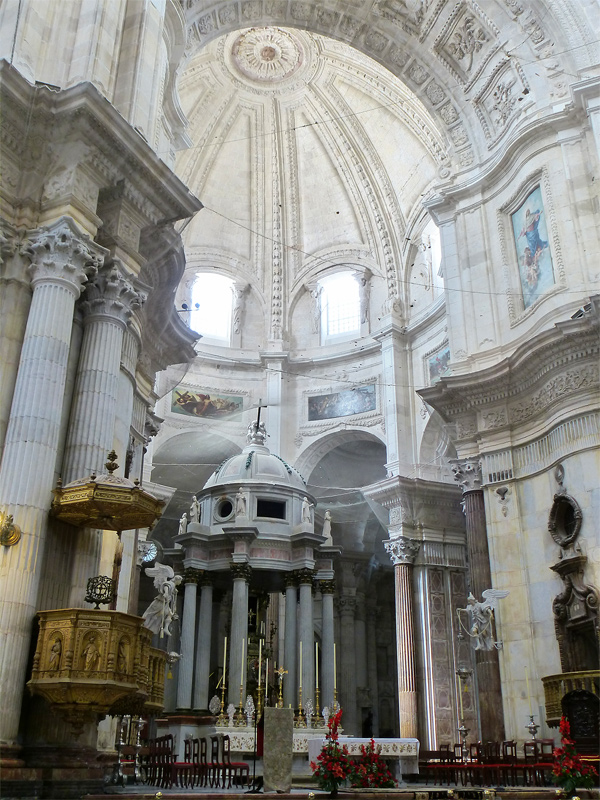
Interior of the cathedral

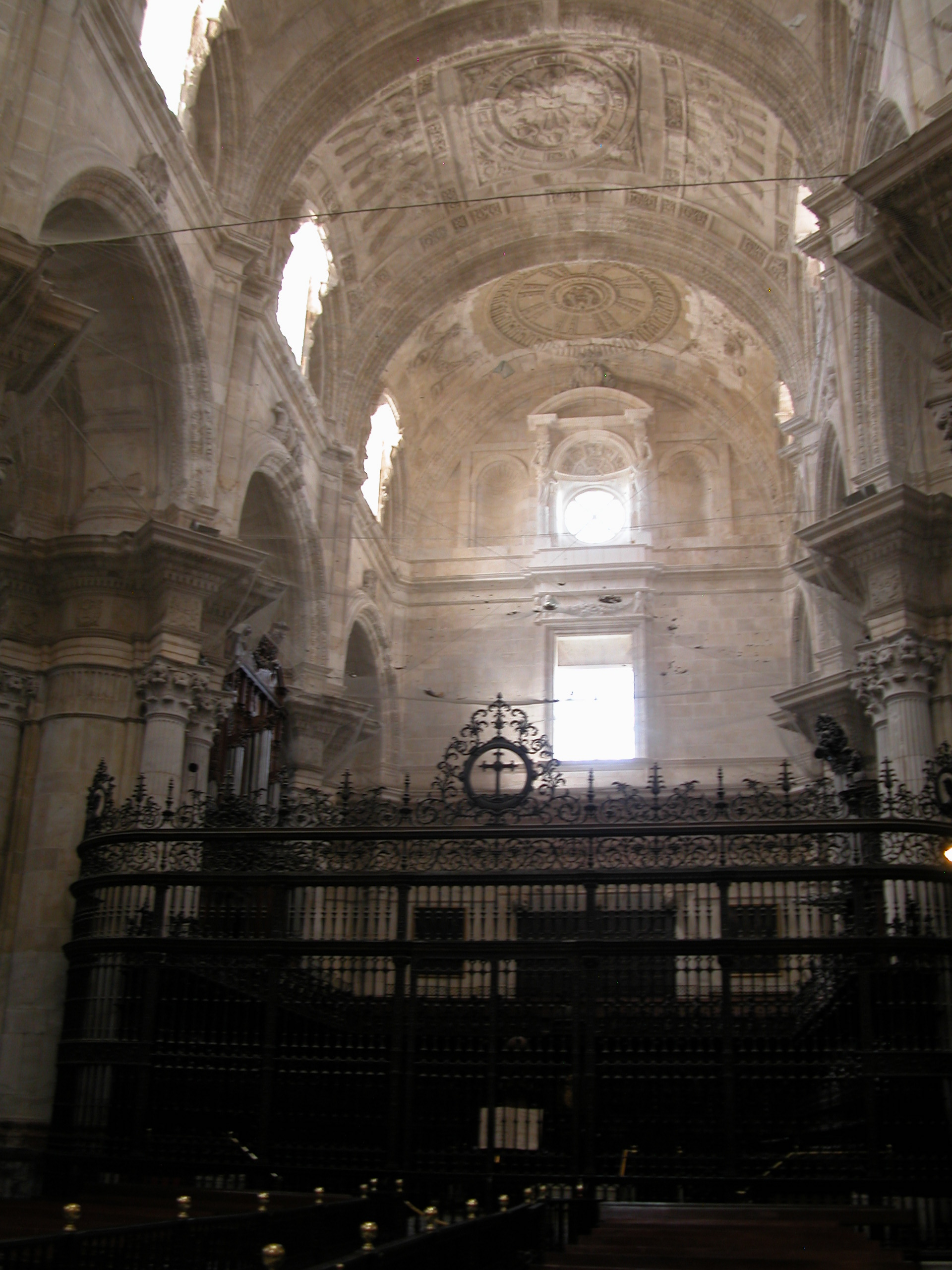
Interior of the cathedral

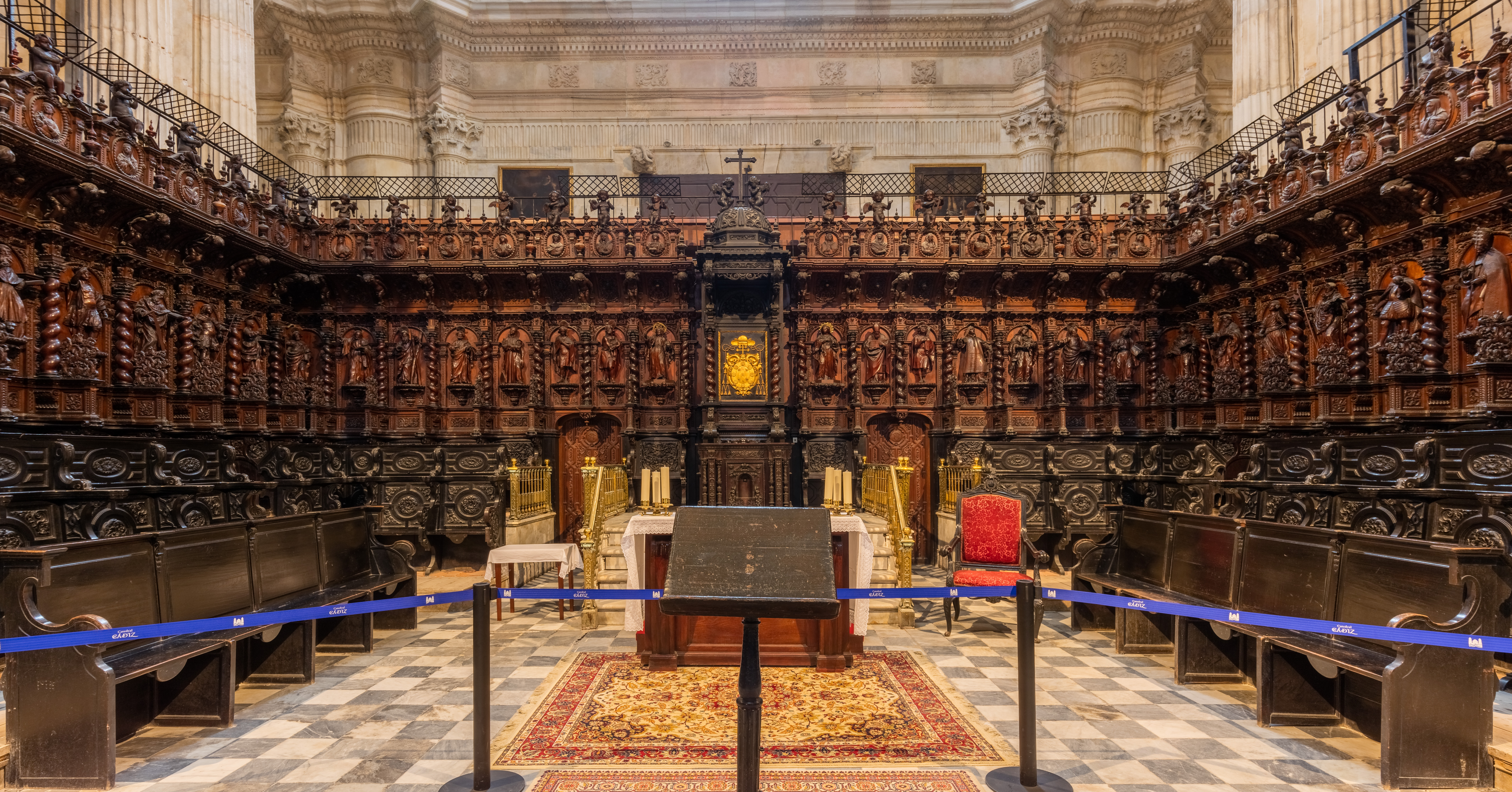
Choir

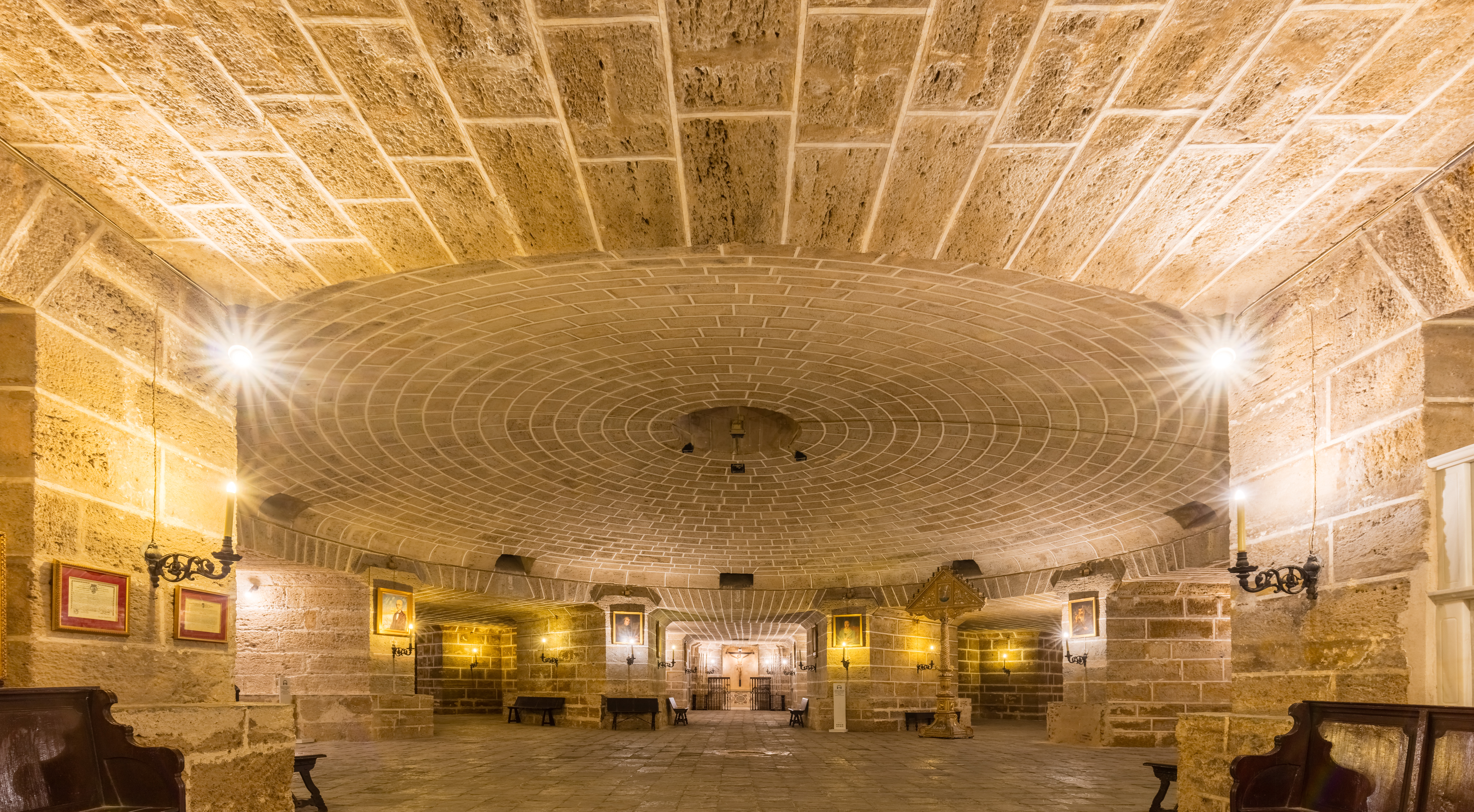
Crypt

== See also ==
- Roman theatre (Cádiz)
