= Iglesia conventual del Carmen (San Fernando) =

Church in San Fernando, Spain

Coordinates: 36°46′0″N 6°20′34″W

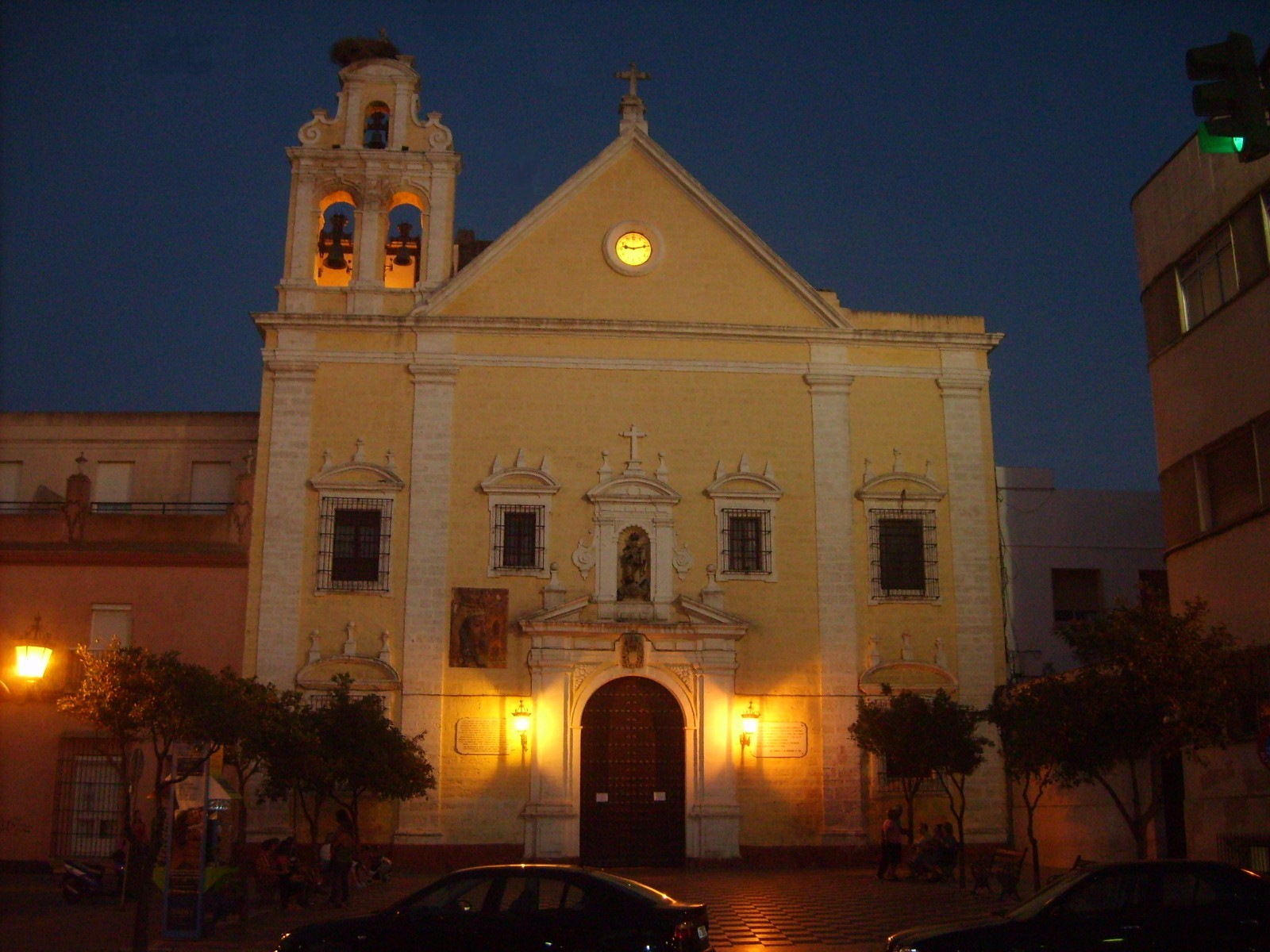

Iglesia conventual del Carmen is a church located in San Fernando in the Province of Cádiz, Andalusia, Spain.

== See also ==
- Roman Catholic Diocese of Cádiz y Ceuta
