= Jerónimo Clavijo =

Spanish Roman Catholic prelate

Most Reverend Jerónimo Clavijo
- Bishop of Nisyros
- Church: Catholic Church
- Diocese: Diocese of Nisyros
- In office: 1564–?
- Previous post: Auxiliary Bishop of Cádiz

Jerónimo Clavijo was a Roman Catholic prelate who served as Bishop of Nisyros and Auxiliary Bishop of Cádiz.

== Biography ==
Jerónimo Clavijo was ordained a priest in the Order of Preachers. On 28 Apr 1564, he was appointed during the papacy of Pope Pius IV as Bishop of Nisyros and Auxiliary Bishop of Cádiz. He succeeded fellow Auxiliary Bishop of Cádiz, Pedro Xague as Bishop of Nisyros.

== External links and additional sources ==
- Cheney, David M. "Diocese of Nisyros". Catholic-Hierarchy.org. (for Chronology of Bishops) ^{[self-published]}
- Chow, Gabriel. "Diocese of Cádiz y Ceuta". GCatholic.org. (for Chronology of Bishops) ^{[self-published]}

Catholic Church titles
Preceded by Pedro Xague	Bishop of Nisyros; 1564–?	Succeeded by
Preceded by	Auxiliary Bishop of Cadiz; 1564–?	Succeeded by
