= Pedro Xague =

Spanish Roman Catholic prelate

Most Reverend Pedro Xague
- Bishop of Nisyros
- Church: Catholic Church
- Diocese: Diocese of Nisyros
- In office: 1560–?
- Previous post: Auxiliary Bishop of Cádiz

Personal details
- Born: Trujillo, Spain

Pedro Xague was a Roman Catholic prelate who served as Bishop of Nisyros and Auxiliary Bishop of Cádiz.

== Biography ==
Pedro Xague born in Trujillo, Spain and ordained a priest in the Order of Preachers. On 4 Sep 1560, he was appointed during the papacy of Pope Pius IV as Bishop of Nisyros and Auxiliary Bishop of Cádiz. It is not certain how long he served in these positions although fellow Auxiliary Bishop of Cádiz, Jerónimo Clavijo, was appointed as Bishop of Nisyros in 1564.

== External links and additional sources ==
- Cheney, David M. "Diocese of Nisyros". Catholic-Hierarchy.org. (for Chronology of Bishops) ^{[self-published]}
- Chow, Gabriel. "Diocese of Cádiz y Ceuta". GCatholic.org. (for Chronology of Bishops) ^{[self-published]}

Catholic Church titles
Preceded by	Bishop of Nisyros; 1560–1564	Succeeded by Jerónimo Clavijo
Preceded by	Auxiliary Bishop of Cadiz; 1560–1564	Succeeded by
