= Félix María Arrieta y Llano =

Spanish Bishop

Félix María Arrieta y Llano OFM Cap
- Bishop of Cádiz y Ceuta
- Church: Catholic Church
- Diocese: Diocese of Cádiz y Ceuta
- In office: 1 October 1863 – 17 February 1879
- Predecessor: Juan José Arbolí y Acaso
- Successor: Jaume Català i Albosa

Orders
- Ordination: April 1835
- Consecration: 6 March 1864 by Lorenzo Barili

Personal details
- Born: 15 March 1811 Cádiz, Kingdom of Spain
- Died: 29 December 1879 (aged 68)

Félix María Arrieta y Llano (15 March 1811 – 29 December 1879) was a Spanish Bishop of Cadiz and Ceuta.

== Biography ==
Félix María Arrieta was born in Cádiz in 1811 and became a priest in 1835 in the Order of Friars Minor Capuchin. He was ordained to be a Bishop in 1864 having been selected the year before.

He resigned in early 1879 and died later that year.
