= Antonio Dorado Soto =

Spanish Roman Catholic bishop

- Bishop of Málaga
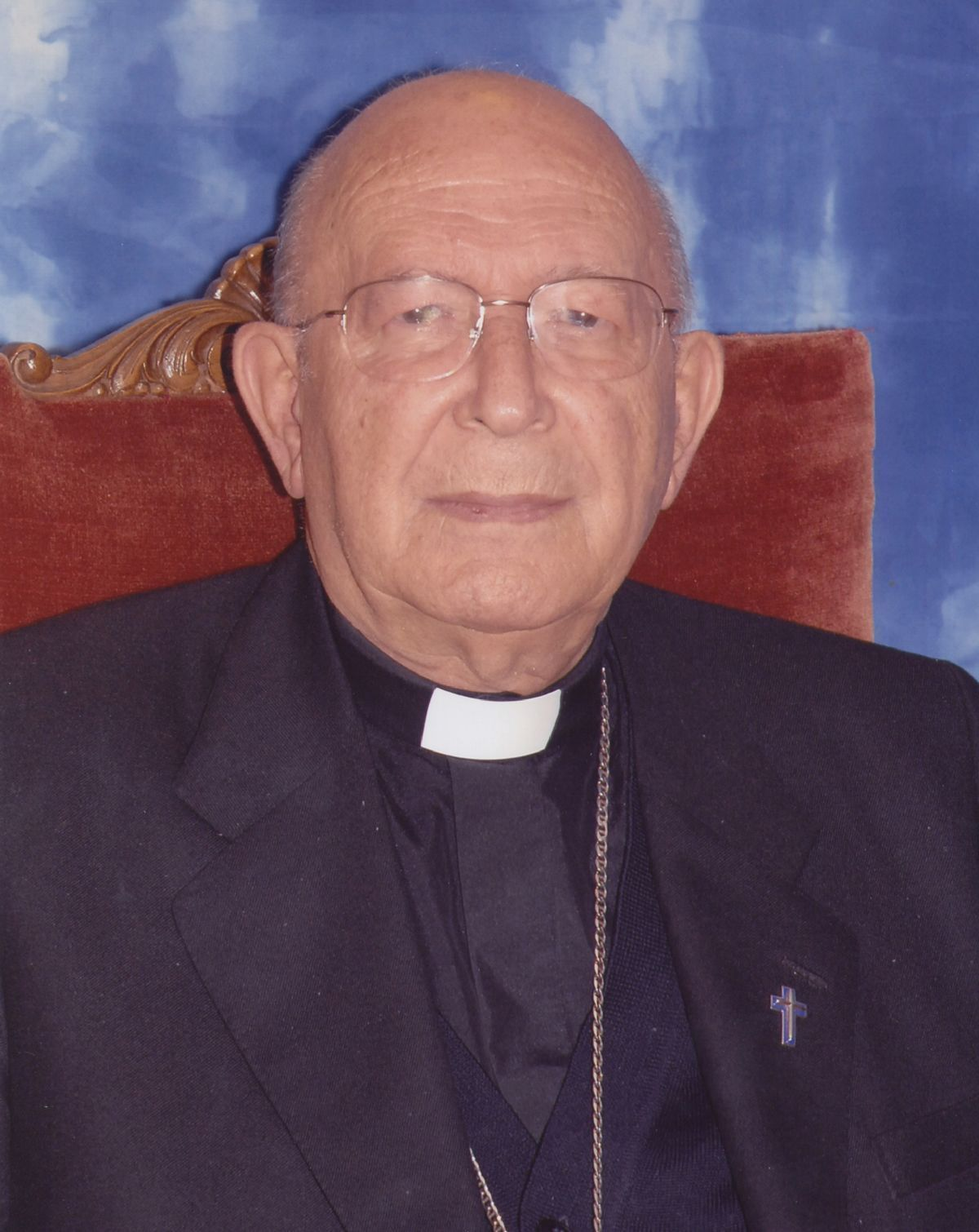
- Church: Catholic Church
- Diocese: Diocese of Málaga
- In office: 26 March 1993 – 10 October 2008
- Predecessor: Ramón Buxarrais Ventura
- Successor: Jesús Catalá Ibáñez
- Previous posts: Bishop of Cádiz y Ceuta (1973-1993); Bishop of Guadix (1970-1973)

Orders
- Ordination: 1 April 1956
- Consecration: 10 May 1970 by Luigi Dadaglio

Personal details
- Born: 18 June 1931 Urda, Province of Toledo, Spanish Republic
- Died: 17 March 2015 (aged 83)

Antonio Dorado Soto (18 June 1931 – 17 March 2015) was a Spanish Roman Catholic bishop.

Ordained to the priesthood in 1956, Dorado Soto was named bishop of Guadix in 1970. He was then named bishop of Cádiz and Ceuta in 1973 and finally bishop of Málaga in 1993. He retired in 2008.
