= Diocese of Málaga =

Latin Catholic jurisdiction in Spain

Diocese of Málaga Dioecesis Malacitanus Diócesis de Málaga

Catholic
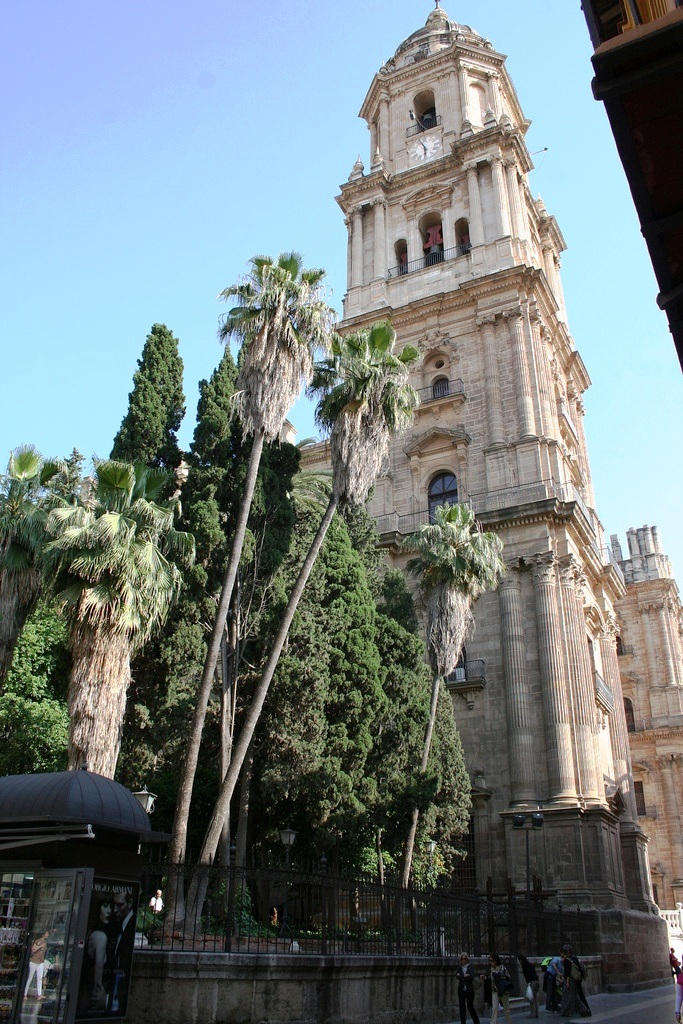
- Málaga Cathedral

Location
- Country: Spain
- Ecclesiastical province: Granada

Statistics
- Area: 7,283 km^{2} (2,812 sq mi)
- Population: Total; Catholics: (as of 2016); 1 628 973; 1 221 729 (75.0%)

Information
- Denomination: Catholic Church
- Sui iuris church: Latin Church
- Rite: Roman Rite
- Established: 4 August 1486
- Cathedral: Cathedral Basilica of the Virgin of Incarnation in Málaga

Current leadership
- Pope: Leo XIV
- Bishop: José Antonio Satué Huerto
- Metropolitan Archbishop: Francisco Javier Martínez Fernández
- Bishops emeritus: Ramón Buxarrais Ventura; Antonio Dorado Soto; Jesús Esteban Catalá Ibáñez

Website
- Website of the Diocese

The Diocese of Málaga (Latin: Malacitan(sis)) is a Latin Church ecclesiastical jurisdiction or diocese of the Catholic Church in Spain. Its episcopal see is the city of Málaga in Andalucía. The diocese is a suffragan diocese in the ecclesiastical province of the metropolitan Archdiocese of Granada.

== History ==
- 4 August 1486: Established as Diocese of Málaga

== Special churches ==
- Minor Basilica:
  - Basílica del Dulce Nombre de Jesús Nazareno del Paso y Maria Santísima de la Esperanza, Málaga

== Leadership ==
- Pedro Díaz de Toledo y Ovalle (5 Dec 1487 – 23 Aug 1499 Died)
- Diego Ramírez de Fuenleal (7 Feb 1500 – 1518 Appointed Bishop of Cuenca)
- Raffaele Sansone Riario (12 Apr 1518 – 9 Jul 1521 Died)
- Cesare Riario (3 Sep 1518 – 18 Dec 1540 Died)
- Raffaele Sansone Riario (3 Sep 1518 – 9 Jul 1521 Died)
- Bernardo Manrique, O.P. (18 Feb 1541 – 25 Sep 1564 Died)
- Francisco Blanco Salcedo (13 Apr 1565 – 4 Jun 1574 Appointed Archbishop of Santiago de Compostela)
- Francisco Pacheco de Córdoba (30 Aug 1574 – 14 Jan 1587 Appointed Bishop of Córdoba)
- Luis García Haro de Sotomayor (7 Aug 1587 – 14 Aug 1597 Died)
- Diego Aponte Quiñones, O.S. (31 Aug 1598 – 24 Apr 1599 Died)
- Tomás de Borja y Castro (19 Jan 1600 – 30 Apr 1603 Appointed Archbishop of Zaragoza)
- Juan Alonso Moscoso (9 May 1603 – 21 Aug 1614 Died)
- Luis Fernández de Córdoba (9 Feb 1615 – 26 Oct 1622 Appointed Archbishop of Santiago de Compostela)
- Francisco Hurtado de Mendoza y Ribera (14 Nov 1622 – 27 Jan 1627 Appointed Bishop of Plasencia)
- Gabriel Trejo y Paniagua (28 Apr 1627 – 12 Feb 1630 Died)
- Antonio Henriquez Porres, O.F.M. (5 Sep 1633 – 20 Feb 1648 Died)
- Alfonso de la Cueva-Benavides y Mendoza-Carrillo, 1st Marquess of Bedmar (27 Jul 1648 – 10 Aug 1655 Died)
- Diego Martínez Zarzosa (31 Jan 1656 – 24 Jun 1658 Died)
- Antonio Peña Hermosa (31 Mar 1659 – 11 Aug 1664 Appointed Bishop of Jaén)
- Alfonso Enríquez de Santo Tomás, O.P. (15 Sep 1664 – 30 Jul 1692 Died)
- Bartolomé Espejos y Cisneros (13 Apr 1693 – 2 Mar 1704 Died)
- Francisco de San José Pedro Mesía y Portocarrero, O.F.M. (15 Sep 1704 – 2 Feb 1713 Died)
- Manuel de Santo Tomás y Mendoza, O.P. (11 Dec 1713 – 19 Aug 1717 Died)
- Giulio Alberoni (6 Dec 1717 – 19 Nov 1725 Resigned)
- Diego González Toro y Villalobos (19 Nov 1725 – 5 May 1734 Appointed Bishop of Cuenca)
- Gaspar de Molina y Oviedo, O.S.A. (5 May 1734 – 30 Aug 1744 Died)
- Juan Eulate Santacruz (25 Jan 1745 – 16 Sep 1755 Died)
- José de Franquís Laso de Castilla (24 May 1756 – 19 Sep 1774 Died)
- José Molina Lario y Navarro (29 Jan 1776 – 5 Jun 1783 Died)
- Manuel Ferrer y Figueredo (14 Feb 1785 – 21 Jul 1799 Died)
- José Vicente Lamadrid (11 Aug 1800 – 9 Mar 1809 Died)
- Ildefonso Cañedo y Vigil (19 Dec 1814 – 27 Jun 1825 Confirmed Archbishop of Burgos)
- Manuel Martínez Ferro, O. de M. (27 Jun 1825 – 3 Jun 1827 Died)
- Juan Francisco Martínez y Castrillón (23 Jun 1828 – 11 Aug 1828 Died)
- Juan Nepomuceno Gómez Durán (27 Jul 1829 – 30 Sep 1830 Died)
- Juan José Bonel y Orbe (28 Feb 1831 – 29 Jul 1833 Appointed Bishop of Córdoba)
- José Gómez y Navas, T.O.R. (29 Jul 1833 – 26 Dec 1835 Died)
- ...
- Salvador José Reyes y García de Lara (20 Jan 1848 – 5 Sep 1851 Confirmed Archbishop of Granada)
- Juan Nepomuceno Cascallana y Ordóñez (5 Sep 1851 – 26 Feb 1868 Died)
- Esteban José Pérez Fernández (22 Jun 1868 – 16 Jan 1874 Appointed Archbishop of Tarragona)
- Zeferino González y Díaz Tuñón, O.P. (16 Jan 1874 – 21 Jun 1875 Resigned)
- Esteban José Pérez Fernández (5 Jul 1875 – 8 Oct 1878 Died)
- Manuel Gómez-Salazar y Lucio-Villegas (31 Dec 1878 – 10 Jun 1886 Appointed Archbishop of Burgos)
- Bl. Marcelo Spinola y Maestre (10 Jun 1886 – 2 Dec 1895 Appointed Archbishop of Sevilla; beatified 1987)
- Juan Muñoz y Herrera (2 Dec 1895 – 26 Dec 1919 Died)
- St. Manuel González García (22 Apr 1920 – 5 Aug 1935 Appointed Bishop of Palencia; canonized 2016)
- Balbino Santos Olvera (5 Aug 1935 – 24 Nov 1946 Appointed Archbishop of Granada)
- Ángel Herrera Oria (24 Apr 1947 – 27 Aug 1966 Retired)
- Emilio Benavent Escuín (7 Apr 1967 – 26 Aug 1968 Appointed Coadjutor Archbishop of Granada)
- Ángel Suquía Goicoechea (28 Nov 1969 – 13 Apr 1973 Appointed Archbishop of Santiago de Compostela)
- Ramón Buxarrais Ventura (13 Apr 1973 – 11 Sep 1991 Resigned)
- Antonio Dorado Soto (26 Mar 1993 – 10 Oct 2008 Retired)
- Jesús Esteban Catalá Ibáñez (10 Oct 2008 – 27 June 2025)
- José Antonio Satué Huerto (since 27 June 2025)

== See also ==
- Roman Catholicism in Spain

== Sources ==
- GCatholic.org
- Catholic Hierarchy
- Diocesan website
