= Francisco Hurtado Izquierdo =

Spanish architect of the Baroque period

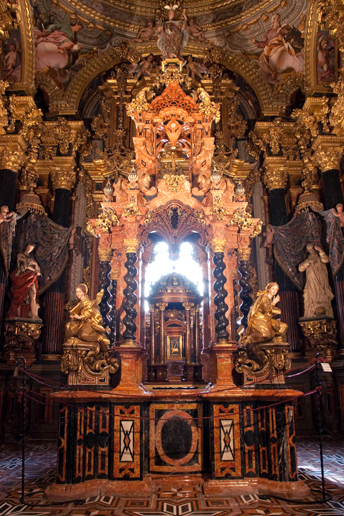
Sagrario in the Granada Charterhouse

Francisco Hurtado Izquierdo y Fernández (10 February 1669 – 30 June 1725) was a Spanish architect of the Baroque period, author of the Sancta Sanctorum (sacristy) in the Granada Charterhouse. He was born and educated in Priego de Córdoba.

During his youth, Hurtado Izquierdo served in the Spanish royal army and may have visited Sicily, which was under Spanish rule at the time. His architectural career was mostly focused on Granada, where he designed the sacrament chapels of the cathedral and charterhouse. The latter was one of his most elaborate works, which he called a "precious jewel" and boasted that there was nothing like it anywhere else in Europe. He also designed the very elaborate camarin of the El Paular Charterhouse in Segovia.

Hurtado Izquierdo became the focus of a school of architect-designers and posthumously had a significant influence on the development of Mexican church decorative architecture. His collaborators included the brothers Jerónimo and Teodosio Sánchez Rueda, Francisco Javier and Tomás Jerónimo Pedraxas.

== Main works ==
- Santa Maria de El Paular Monastery (Rascafría, Madrid): chapel of the sacristy and the Transparente
- Retable of Santiago in the Granada Cathedral
- Hospital of Cardinal Salazar in Córdoba
- Church of the Tabernacle in Granada
- Córdoba Cathedral: Chapel of St. Teresa

== Sources ==
- Raya Raya, María de los Ángeles. «Francisco Hurtado Izquierdo y su proyección en el arte andaluz del siglo XVIII». En: Congreso Internacional Andalucía Barroca. I. Arte, Arquitectura y Urbanismo. Actas. Sevilla: Junta de Andalucía, 2009, pp. 191–208. ISBN 978-84-8266-837-6
- Taylor, René. «Francisco Hurtado and his school». Art Bulletin, XXXII (1950), pp. 25–61; «La Sacristía de la Cartuja de Granada y sus autores». Archivo Español de Arte, 138 (1962), pp. 135–172; «Los púlpitos de la Catedral de Granada». Boletín de Bellas Artes, 6 (1978), pp. 179–195.
