= Rafael Zornoza =

Spanish bishop

- Bishop Emeritus of Cádiz y Ceuta
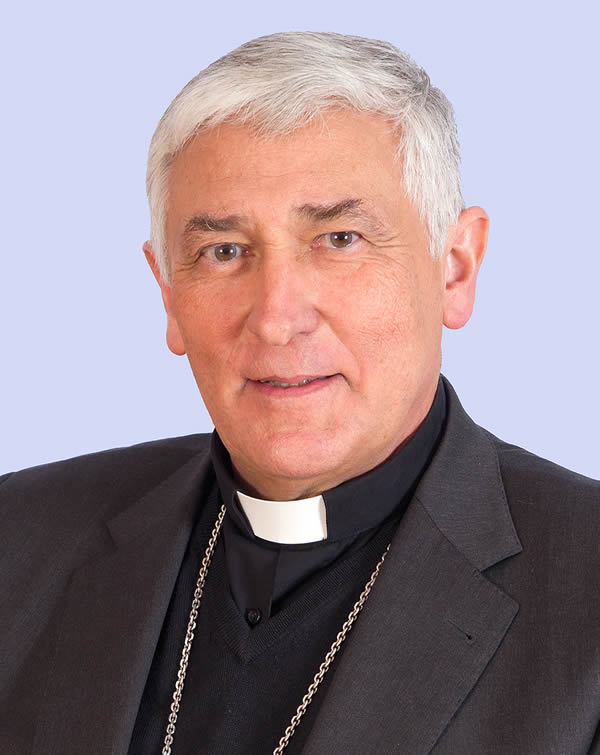
- Church: Catholic Church
- Diocese: Diocese of Cádiz y Ceuta
- In office: 30 August 2011 – 22 November 2025
- Predecessor: Antonio Ceballos Atienza
- Previous posts: Titular Bishop of Mentesa (2005-2011); Auxiliary Bishop of Getafe (2005-2011)

Orders
- Ordination: 19 March 1975
- Consecration: 5 February 2006 by Joaquín María López de Andújar y Cánovas del Castillo

Personal details
- Born: 31 July 1949 (age 76) Madrid, Spanish State

Rafael Zornoza Boy (born 31 July 1949) is a Spanish prelate of the Catholic Church who was the bishop of the Diocese of Cádiz y Ceuta from 2011 to 2025. He was auxiliary bishop of Getafe from 2005 to 2011.

== Biography ==
Born in Madrid on 31 July 1949, the third of six children, Zornoza studied at the Piarist School of Madrid while also studying music and piano at the Madrid Royal Conservatory. After attending the Minor Seminary of Madrid, he studied at the Conciliar Seminary of Madrid from 1969 to 1974, graduating with a degree in theology. He has a degree in Biblical theology from the Comillas Pontifical University. He has been noted for his support of youth outreach and culture.

Zornoza was ordained as a priest for the Archdiocese of Madrid on 19 March 1975. He was vicar of the Parish of Saint George and then a parish priest in 1983. In 1991, he became private secretary to the bishop of the newly created Diocese of Getafe, formed from part of the Madrid diocese. He founded the new diocese's seminary in 1992 and served as its rector from 1994 to 2010.

On 13 December 2005, Pope Benedict XVI named him auxiliary bishop of Getafe and titular bishop of Mentesa. He received his episcopal consecration on 5 February 2006 from Joaquín María López de Andújar y Cánovas del Castillo, Bishop of Getafe.

Pope Benedict XVI named him bishop of the Diocese of Cádiz y Ceuta on 30 August 2011, after the resignation of Antonio Ceballos Atienza. He took possession of his see on 22 October 2011.

In 2024, Zornoza submitted his resignation upon reaching the mandatory retirement age of 75. The Spanish newspaper El País reported in November 2025 that Zornoza was under investigation by a church tribunal because a former seminarian had alleged that during the 1990s, between the ages of 14 and 21, he had been repeatedly abused by Zornoza who was then director of the seminary in Getafe. The Diocese denied the allegation and reported that Zornoza was being treated for cancer. Pope Leo XIV accepted Zornoza's resignation on 22 November 2025.
