= Gaspar de Molina y Oviedo =

Spanish cardinal

Gaspar de Molina y Oviedo OESA
- Bishop of Málaga
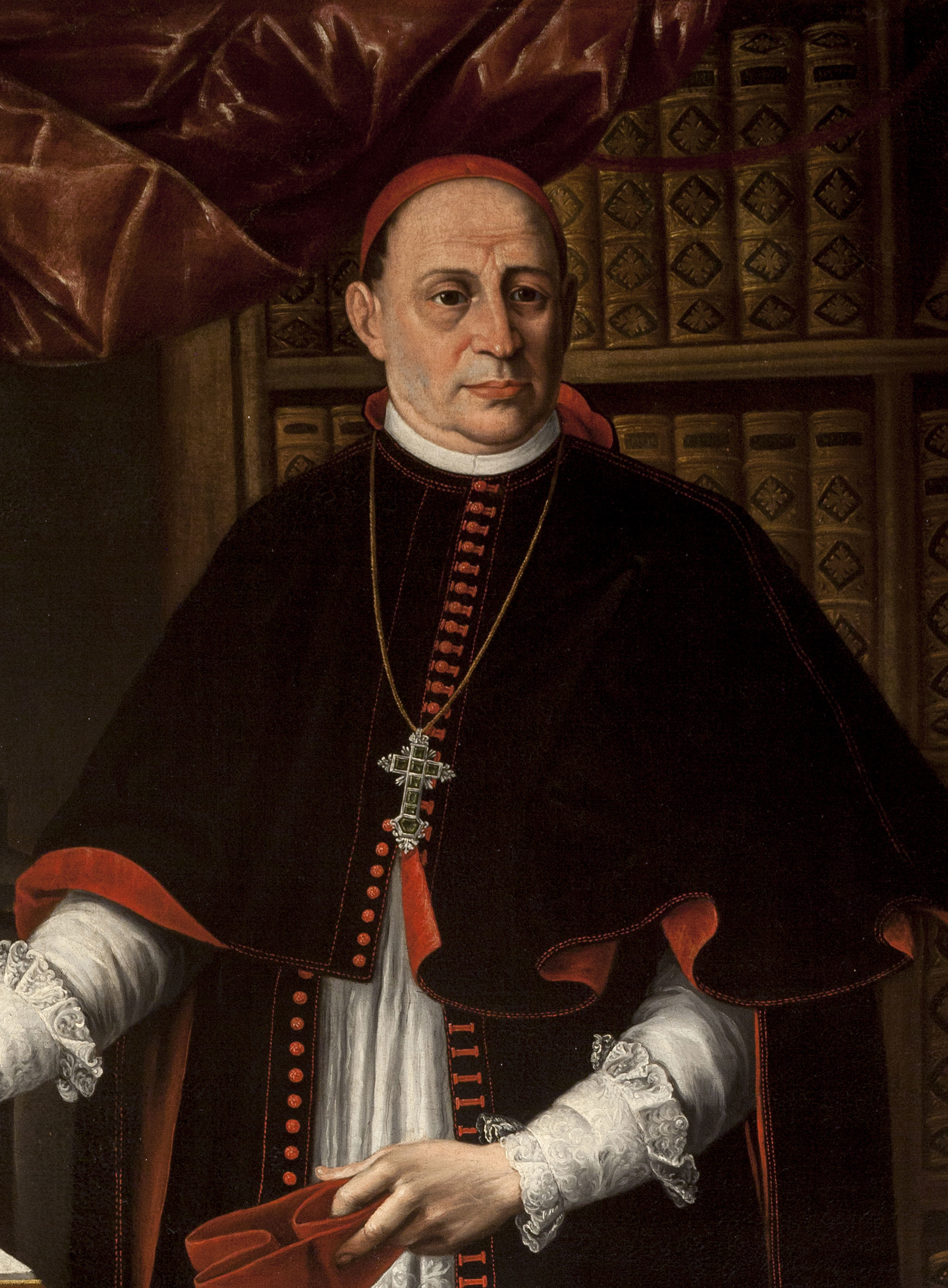
- Gaspar de Molina y Oviedo, painted by Alonso Miguel de Tovar (Seville City Hall)
- Church: Catholic Church
- Diocese: Diocese of Málaga
- In office: 5 May 1734 – 30 August 1744
- Predecessor: Diego González Toro y Villalobos
- Successor: Juan de Eulate y Santa Cruz
- Previous posts: Bishop of Barcelona (1731-1734); Bishop of Santiago de Cuba (1730-1731)

Orders
- Consecration: 24 February 1731 by Luis de Salcedo y Azcona
- Created cardinal: 20 December 1737 by Pope Clement XII

Personal details
- Born: 6 January 1679 Mérida, Kingdom of Spain
- Died: 30 August 1744 (aged 65)

Gaspar de Molina y Oviedo (6 January 1679 – 30 August 1744) was a Spanish cardinal.

He entered the Order of Saint Augustine in 1694, professing the following year in a convent in Badajoz. He was a professor at the Colegio de San Acacio, of the Augustinians of Seville, prior of Cádiz in 1712, provincial and general assistant of his order in 1720.

He was appointed Bishop of Cuba in 1730, of Barcelona in 1731 and of Malaga in 1734, although he did not exercise in any of these dioceses because he was in Madrid carrying out various political positions at the service of Felipe V. Among his positions at court, from 1734 until his death he held the presidency of the Council of Castile and that of the Council and Commissariat of the Crusade.

In 1737 he was made a Cardinal by Pope Clement XII. He died suddenly at the age of 65, and was buried in the Convent of San Felipe el Real de Madrid

== External links and additional sources ==
- Cheney, David M. "Archdiocese of Santiago de Cuba". Catholic-Hierarchy.org. (for Chronology of Bishops) ^{[self-published]}
- Chow, Gabriel. "Metropolitan Archdiocese of Santiago". GCatholic.org. (for Chronology of Bishops) ^{[self-published]}
