= Ermita del Cerro de los Mártires =

Church in San Fernando, Spain

Coordinates: 36°44′0″N 6°21′32″W

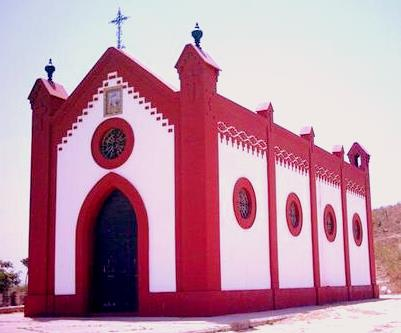

Ermita del Cerro de los Mártires is a church located in San Fernando in the Province of Cádiz, Andalusia, Spain.
