= Ramón Buxarrais Ventura =

Spanish Roman Catholic bishop (born 1929)

The Most Reverend Ramón Buxarrais Ventura
- Bishop Emeritus of Málaga
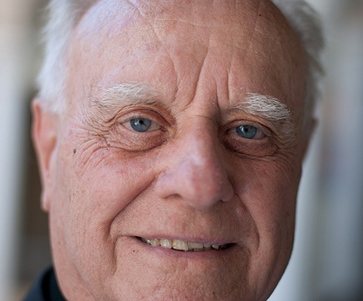
- Church: Catholic Church
- Diocese: Roman Catholic Diocese of Málaga
- Appointed: 14 April 1973
- Term ended: 11 September 1991
- Predecessor: Ángel Suquía Goicoechea
- Successor: Jesús Esteban Catalá Ibáñez

Orders
- Ordination: 17 December 1955
- Consecration: 3 October 1971 by Luigi Dadaglio

Personal details
- Born: 12 December 1929 (age 96) Santa Perpètua de Mogoda, Province of Barcelona, Spain

Ramón Buxarrais Ventura (born 12 December 1929) is a Spanish Roman Catholic prelate, who served as bishop of the Roman Catholic Diocese of Zamora in Spain from 1971 to 1973 and of the Roman Catholic Diocese of Málaga from 1973 until his resignation in 1991. He holds the title of Bishop Emeritus of Málaga.

== Early life and education ==
Ramón Buxarrais Ventura was born in Santa Perpètua de Mogoda in the Archdiocese of Barcelona. He entered the seminary at a young age and completed ecclesiastical studies in philosophy and theology, obtaining a licentiate in theology at the Faculty of Theology of Sant Cugat del Vallès.

He was ordained a priest on 17 December 1955 and incardinated into then Diocese of Barcelona.

== Priestly ministry ==
After his ordination, Buxarrais served in parish ministry in the Diocese of Barcelona. In 1959 he was sent as a missionary to northern Chile, where he worked in the Roman Catholic Diocese of Antofagasta. During his time there, he held several responsibilities, including parish priest, vicar general, and prison chaplain, gaining recognition for his pastoral work among marginalized communities.

== Episcopal career ==
On 19 August 1971, Pope Paul VI appointed Buxarrais as bishop of the Roman Catholic Diocese of Zamora in Spain. He received episcopal consecration on 3 October 1971 from Archbishop Luigi Dadaglio, Apostolic Nuncio to Spain.

On 14 April 1973, he was appointed bishop of Málaga. He took canonical possession of the diocese on 23 June 1973 and made his solemn entry on 29 June 1973.

As bishop of Málaga, Buxarrais promoted pastoral renewal in line with the Second Vatican Council, strengthened priestly and lay formation, supported the work of Caritas Spain, and encouraged missionary cooperation, particularly with dioceses in Venezuela. He also fostered the preservation of diocesan archives and religious artistic heritage.

Within the Spanish Episcopal Conference, he served as a member of several episcopal commissions, including those for Missions, Clergy, and Social Communications.

== Resignation and later life ==
Buxarrais resigned as bishop of Málaga on 11 September 1991. After his resignation, he settled in Melilla, where he continued pastoral work as a chaplain in healthcare institutions and prisons and collaborated with charitable and educational initiatives, including projects in Morocco.

== Publications ==
Buxarrais is the author of several spiritual and autobiographical works, including:

- Cartas a Valerio
- Confesiones de un obispo que no quiso serlo
- Desde lo oscuro al alba
