= List of first women mayors of places in Spain =

This is a list of first women to be mayors of cities in Spain, limited to the list of mayors of the 50 largest cities in Spain, and those of capitals of autonomous communities, provinces and autonomous cities.

Eloína Suárez was the first woman to be mayor of a provincial capital in Spain, in Oviedo, the capital of Asturias. In June 1978, following the resignation through illness of Félix Serrano González-Solares and then of his deputy and successor Higinio Rodríguez, she became the mayor. She remained in office until the first democratic elections in April 1979.

In democratic local governments, Clementina Ródenas, of the Spanish Socialist Workers' Party (PSOE) in Valencia was the first woman mayor of a provincial capital, succeeding Ricard Pérez Casado after his resignation in January 1989. In the 1991 Spanish local elections, she ran as the PSOE candidate for mayor and won a plurality of seats, but Rita Barberá of the People's Party was elected mayor instead. In the same set of elections, Carmina Belmonte (PSOE; Albacete) was the first woman democratically elected as a mayor of a provincial capital, as opposed to succeeding a resigned predecessor; she won the majority, while Barberá and Blanca Calvo Alonso-Cortés (United Left; Guadalajara) had to negotiate with other parties.

== Andalusia ==
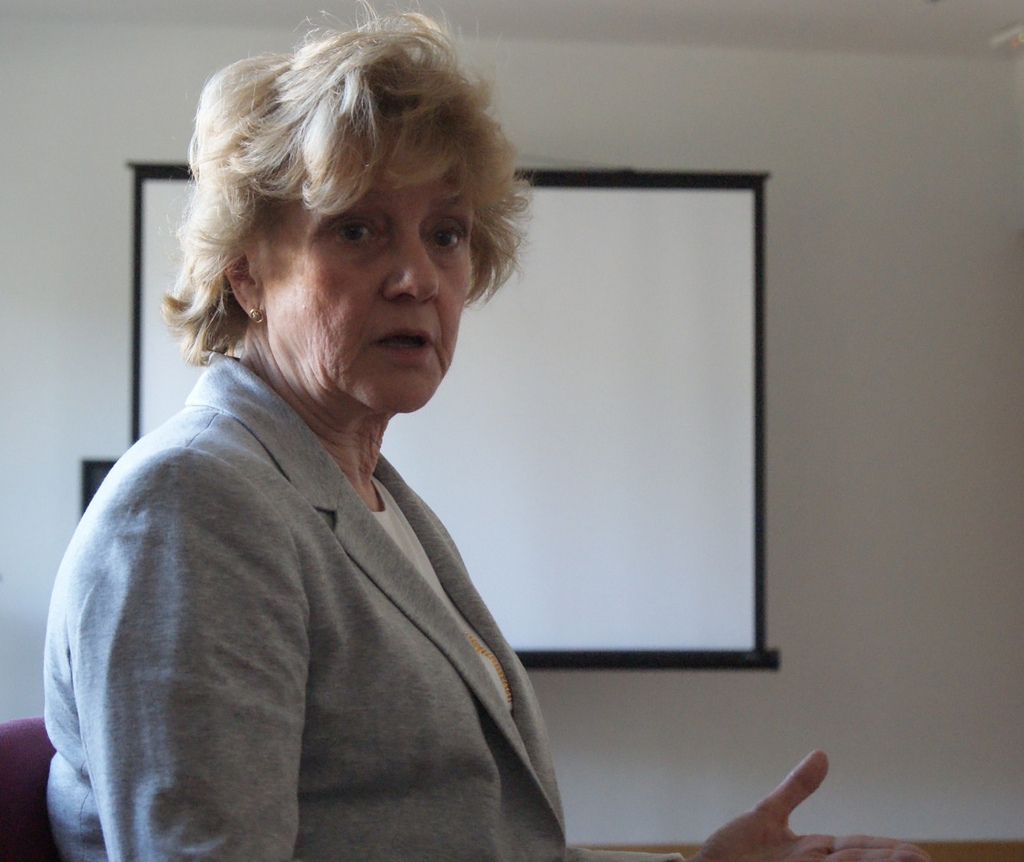
Soledad Becerril was the first female mayor of Andalusia's capital Seville, and the first woman minister of the national government since the Spanish transition to democracy.

- Almería: María del Mar Vázquez Agüero (PP; 2022–)
- Cádiz: Teófila Martínez (PP; 1995–2015)
- Córdoba: Rosa Aguilar (IULV-CA; 1999–2009)
- Dos Hermanas has not had a female mayor.
- Granada: Marifrán Carazo (PP; 2023–)
- Huelva: Pilar Miranda Plata (PP; 2023–)
- Jaén: Carmen Peñalver (PSOE; 2007–2011)
- Jerez de la Frontera: María José García-Pelayo (PP; 2003–2005, 2011–2015, 2023–)
- Málaga: Celia Villalobos (PP; 1995–2000)
- Marbella: Marisol Yagüe (GIL; 2003–2006)
- Seville: Soledad Becerril (PP; 1995–1999)

== Aragon ==
- Huesca: Ana Alós (PP; 2011–2015)
- Teruel: Lucía Gómez (PSOE; 2003–2007)
- Zaragoza: Luisa Fernanda Rudi (PP; 1995–2003)

== Asturias ==
- Gijón: Paz Fernández Felgueroso (PSOE; 1999–2011)
- Oviedo: Eloína Suárez (1978–1979); no woman has been elected since first democratic elections in 1979.

== Balearic Islands ==
- Palma de Mallorca: Catalina Cirer (PP; 2003–2007)

== Basque Country ==
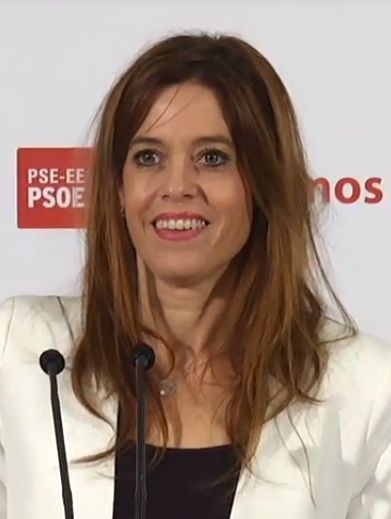
Maider Etxebarria was the first woman mayor of a provincial capital of the Basque Country.

- Bilbao has not had a female mayor.
- San Sebastián has not had a female mayor.
- Vitoria-Gasteiz: Maider Etxebarria (PSOE; 2023–)

== Canary Islands ==
- Las Palmas: Pepa Luzardo (PP; 2003–2007)
- San Cristóbal de La Laguna: Ana Oramas (CC; 1999–2008)
- Santa Cruz de Tenerife: Patricia Hernández (PSOE; 2019–2020)

== Cantabria ==
- Santander: Gema Igual (PP; 2016–)

== Castile and León ==
- Ávila: Dolores Ruiz-Ayúcar (PP; 1995–1999)
- Burgos: Cristina Ayala (PP; 2023–)
- León has not had a female mayor.
- Palencia: Miriam Andrés (PSOE; 2023–)
- Salamanca has not had a female mayor.
- Soria: Eloísa Álvarez (PSOE; 1999–2003)
- Valladolid: María de las Mercedes Cantalapiedra (PP; 2015 ad interim)
- Zamora: Rosa Valdeón (PP; 2007–2015)

== Castilla–La Mancha ==
- Albacete: Carmina Belmonte (PSOE; 1991–1995)
- Ciudad Real: Rosa Romero (PP; 2007–2015)
- Cuenca has not had a female mayor.
- Guadalajara: Blanca Calvo Alonso-Cortés (IU; 1991–1992)
- Toledo: Milagros Tolón (PSOE; 2015–2023)

== Catalonia ==
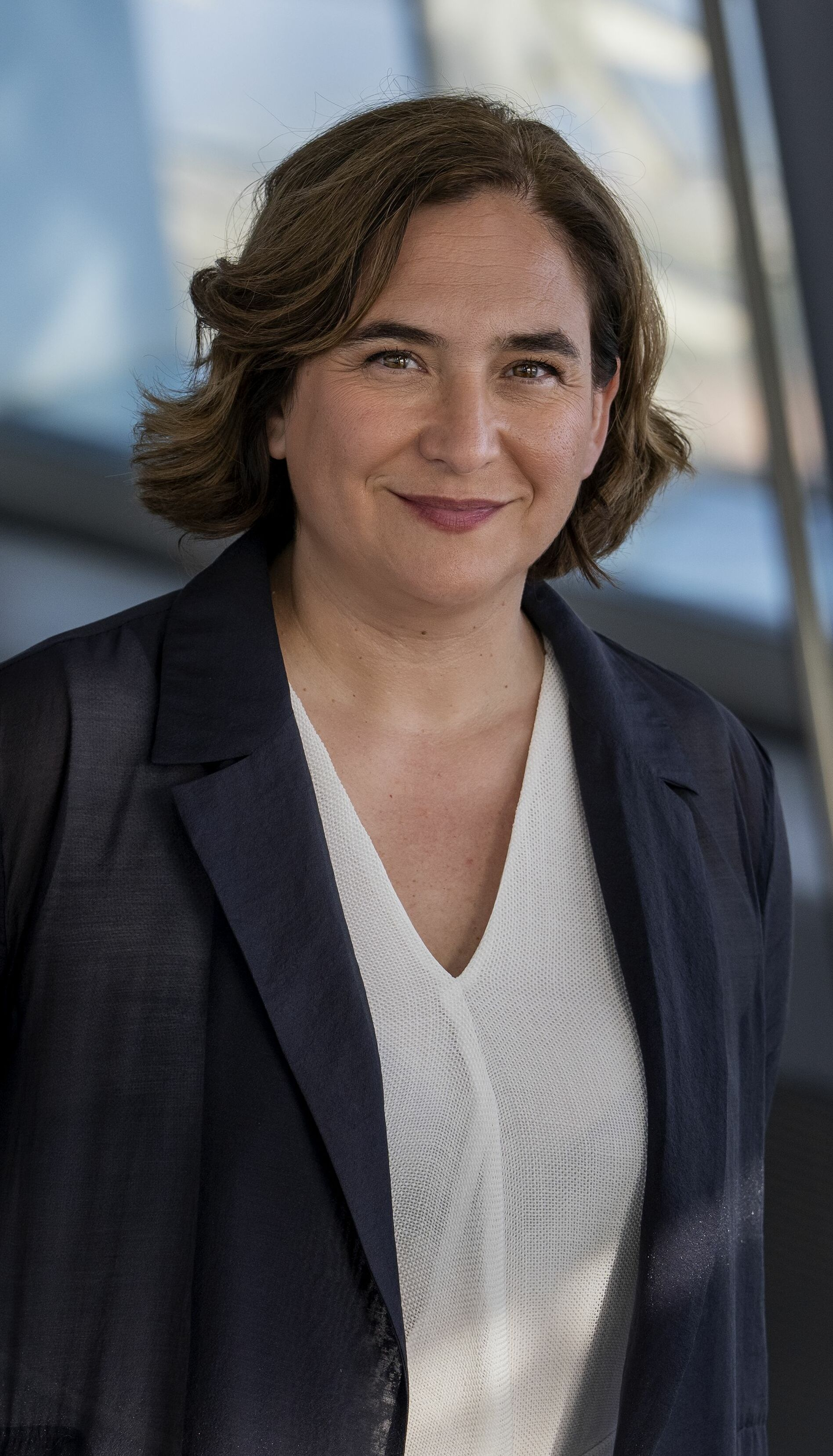
Ada Colau was the first woman to be mayor of Barcelona

- Badalona: Maite Arqué (PSC; 1999–2008)
- Barcelona: Ada Colau (BComú; 2015–2023)
- Girona: Anna Pagans (PSC; 2002–2011)
- L'Hospitalet de Llobregat: Núria Marín (PSC; 2008–2024)
- Lleida has not had a female mayor.
- Sabadell: Marta Farrés (PSC; 2019–)
- Tarragona has not had a female mayor.
- Terrassa has not had a female mayor.

== Extremadura ==
- Badajoz has not had a female mayor.
- Cáceres: Carmen Heras (PSOE; 2007–2011)
- Mérida has not had a woman mayor, but has named Queen Sofía of Spain (1977) and Eulalia of Mérida (2004) as honorary eternal mayors.

== Galicia ==
- A Coruña: Inés Rey (PSOE; 2019–)
- Lugo: Lara Méndez (PSOE; 2015–2024)
- Ourense has not had a female mayor.
- Pontevedra has not had a female mayor.
- Santiago de Compostela: Goretti Sanmartín (BNG; 2023–)
- Vigo: Corina Porro (PP; 2003–2007)

== La Rioja ==
- Logroño: Cuca Gamarra (PP; 2011–2019)

== Community of Madrid ==
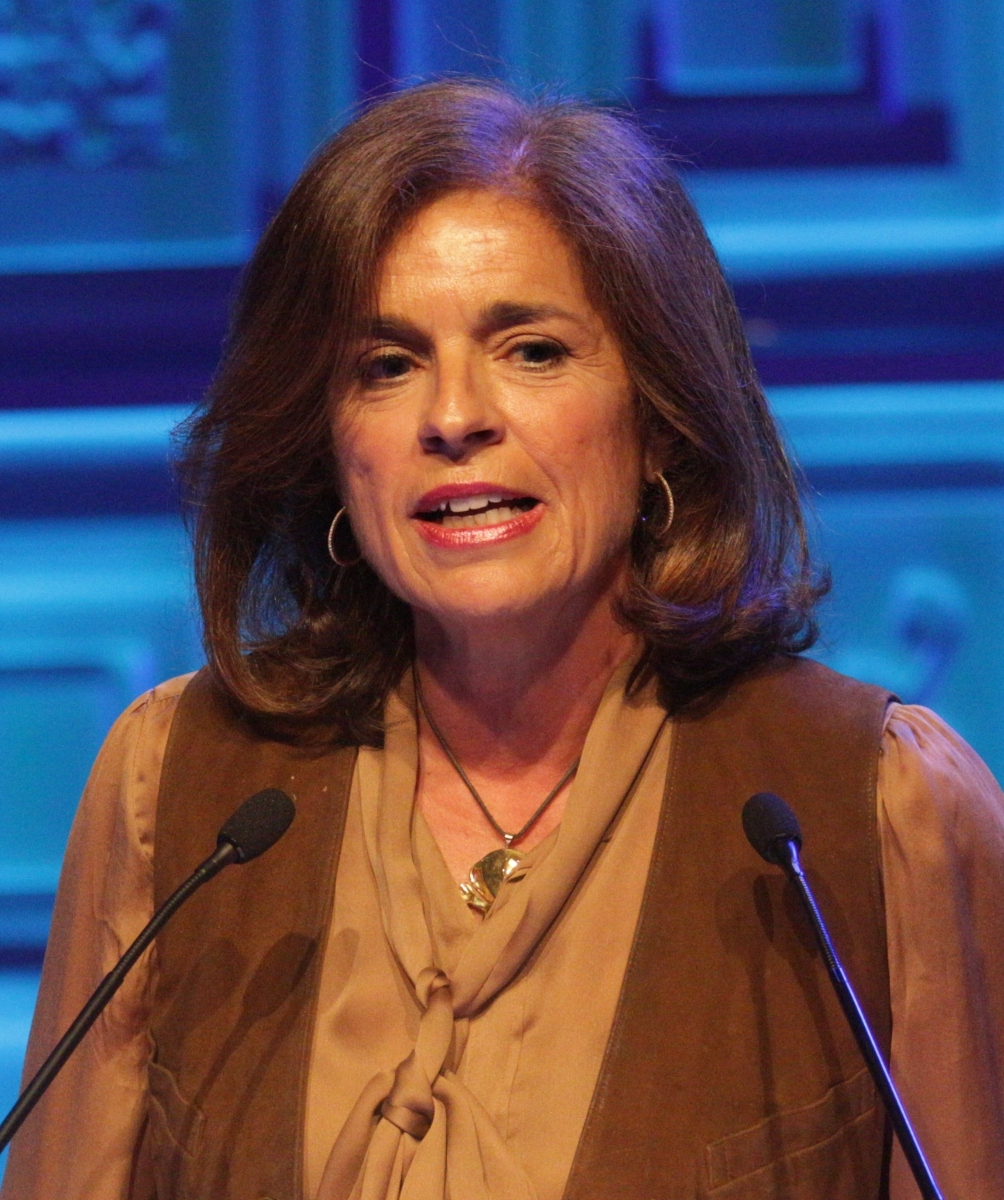
Ana Botella was the first woman to be mayor of Madrid

- Alcalá de Henares: Judith Piquet (PP; 2023–)
- Alcorcón: Natalia de Andrés (PSOE; 2019–2023)
- Fuenlabrada has not had a female mayor.
- Getafe: Sara Hernández (PSOE; 2015–)
- Leganés: Guadalupe Bragado (PP; 2007)
- Madrid: Ana Botella (PP; 2011–2015)
- Móstoles: Noelia Posse Gómez (PSOE; 2018–2023)
- Torrejón de Ardoz: Trinidad Rollan (PSOE; 1999–2007)

== Region of Murcia ==
- Cartagena: Pilar Barreiro (PP; 1995–2015)
- Murcia: Rebeca Pérez (PP; 2026–)

== Navarre ==
- Pamplona: Yolanda Barcina (UPN; 1999–2011)

== Valencian Community ==
- Alicante: Sonia Castedo (PP; 2008–2014)
- Castellón de la Plana: Amparo Marco (PSOE; 2015–2023)
- Elche: Mercedes Alonso García (PP; 2011–2015)
- Valencia: Clementina Ródenas (PSOE; 1988–1991); Rita Barberá (PP; 1991–2015) first to take office after an election.
