= List of mayors of the 50 largest cities in Spain =

This is a list of mayors of the 50 largest cities in Spain, are ordered the estimated populations as of 2024. These 50 cities have a combined population of 17.5 million, or 37% of the national population.

The breakdown of mayoral political parties is 30 from the People's Party, 14 from the Spanish Socialist Workers' Party and the Socialists' Party of Catalonia, and 6 from local or regional political parties.

== List ==
Name	Photo	Party	City	Region	Population	Rank	Term start	Seats
José Luis Martínez-Almeida		People's Party	Madrid	Community of Madrid	3,416,771	1	June 15, 2019	29 / 57
Jaume Collboni		Socialists' Party of Catalonia	Barcelona	Catalonia	1,702,547	2	June 17, 2023	10 / 41
María José Catalá		People's Party	Valencia	Valencian Community	825,948	3	June 17, 2023	13 / 33
José Luis Sanz		People's Party	Seville	Andalusia	687,488	4	June 17, 2023	14 / 31
Natalia Chueca		People's Party	Zaragoza	Aragon	686,986	5	June 17, 2023	15 / 31
Francisco de la Torre		People's Party	Málaga	Andalusia	591,637	6	May 4, 2000	17 / 31
Rebeca Pérez		People's Party	Murcia	Region of Murcia	474,617	7	May 10, 2026	15 / 29
Jaime Martínez		People's Party	Palma de Mallorca	Balearic Islands	431,521	8	June 17, 2023	11 / 29
Carolina Darias		Spanish Socialist Workers' Party	Las Palmas	Canary Islands	380,436	9	June 17, 2023	12 / 29
Luis Barcala		People's Party	Alicante	Valencian Community	358,720	10	April 19, 2018	14 / 29
Juan Mari Aburto		Basque Nationalist Party	Bilbao	Basque Country	348,089	11	June 13, 2015	12 / 29
José María Bellido		People's Party	Córdoba	Andalusia	322,811	12	June 15, 2019	15 / 29
Jesús Julio Carnero		People's Party	Valladolid	Castile and León	300,618	13	June 17, 2023	11 / 27
Abel Caballero		Spanish Socialist Workers' Party	Vigo	Galicia	293,977	14	June 16, 2007	19 / 27
David Quirós		Socialists' Party of Catalonia	Hospitalet de Llobregat	Catalonia	279,993	15	June 15, 2024	13 / 27
Carmen Moriyón		Asturias Forum	Gijón	Asturias	268,561	16	June 17, 2023	8 / 27
Maider Etxebarria		Spanish Socialist Workers' Party	Vitoria	Basque Country	257,968	17	June 17, 2023	6 / 27
Inés Rey		Spanish Socialist Workers' Party	A Coruña	Galicia	249,261	18	June 15, 2019	11 / 27
Pablo Ruz		People's Party	Elche	Valencian Community	243,128	19	June 17, 2023	11 / 27
Marifrán Carazo		People's Party	Granada	Andalusia	232,717	20	June 17, 2023	15 / 27
Jordi Ballart		Everything for Terrassa	Terrassa	Catalonia	228,708	21	June 15, 2019	11 / 27
Xavier García Albiol		People's Party	Badalona	Catalonia	227,083	22	June 17, 2023	18 / 27
Marta Farrés		Socialists' Party of Catalonia	Sabadell	Catalonia	222,177	23	June 15, 2019	14 / 27
Alfredo Canteli		People's Party	Oviedo	Asturias	220,543	24	June 15, 2019	14 / 27
Noelia Arroyo		People's Party	Cartagena	Region of Murcia	219,777	25	June 12, 2021	10 / 27
Manuel Bautista		People's Party	Móstoles	Community of Madrid	214,006	26	June 17, 2023	12 / 27
María José García-Pelayo		People's Party	Jerez de la Frontera	Andalusia	213,668	27	June 17, 2023	14 / 27
José Manuel Bermúdez		Canarian Coalition	Santa Cruz de Tenerife	Canary Islands	211,359	28	July 13, 2020	9 / 27
Joseba Asirón		EH Bildu	Pamplona	Navarre	207,777	29	December 28, 2023	8 / 27
María del Mar Vázquez		People's Party	Almería	Andalusia	202,675	30	September 2, 2022	15 / 27
Judith Piquet		People's Party	Alcalá de Henares	Community of Madrid	200,702	31	June 17, 2023	11 / 27
Miguel Ángel Recuenco		People's Party	Leganés	Community of Madrid	194,084	32	June 17, 2023	9 / 27
Javier Ayala		Spanish Socialist Workers' Party	Fuenlabrada	Community of Madrid	190,790	33	February 2, 2018	16 / 27
Sara Hernández		Spanish Socialist Workers' Party	Getafe	Community of Madrid	189,906	34	June 13, 2015	10 / 27
Jon Insausti		Basque Nationalist Party	San Sebastián	Basque Country	189,093	35	October 29, 2025	9 / 27
Begoña Carrasco		People's Party	Castellón de la Plana	Valencian Community	180,379	36	June 17, 2023	11 / 27
Cristina Ayala		People's Party	Burgos	Castile and León	175,895	37	June 17, 2023	11 / 27
Manuel Serrano López		People's Party	Albacete	Castilla-La Mancha	174,137	38	June 17, 2023	12 / 27
Gema Igual		People's Party	Santander	Cantabria	174,101	39	November 17, 2016	14 / 27
Candelaria Testa		Spanish Socialist Workers' Party	Alcorcón	Community of Madrid	173,625	40	June 17, 2023	8 / 27
Luis Yeray Gutiérrez		Spanish Socialist Workers' Party	San Cristóbal de la Laguna	Canary Islands	160,258	41	June 15, 2019	10 / 27
Ángeles Muñoz		People's Party	Marbella	Andalusia	159,000	42	August 29, 2017	14 / 27
Conrado Escobar		People's Party	Logroño	La Rioja	151,164	43	June 17, 2023	14 / 27
Ignacio Gragera		People's Party	Badajoz	Extremadura	150,570	43	June 27, 2021	14 / 27
Carlos García Carbayo		People's Party	Salamanca	Castile and León	144,866	45	December 20, 2018	14 / 27
Fèlix Larrosa		Socialists' Party of Catalonia	Lleida	Catalonia	144,739	46	June 17, 2023	9 / 27
Pilar Miranda		People's Party	Huelva	Andalusia	143,290	47	June 17, 2023	13 / 27
Rubén Viñuales		Socialists' Party of Catalonia	Tarragona	Catalonia	141,151	48	June 17, 2023	9 / 27
Alejandro Navarro		People's Party	Torrejón de Ardoz	Community of Madrid	140,626	49	August 25, 2023	21 / 27
Francisco Rodríguez		Spanish Socialist Workers' Party	Dos Hermanas	Andalusia	140,430	50	February 4, 2022	16 / 27

== See also ==
- List of Spanish cities by population
- Mayoralty in Spain
- Spanish Federation of Municipalities and Provinces
