= Ranked lists of Spanish municipalities =

Municipalities of Spain. 2004

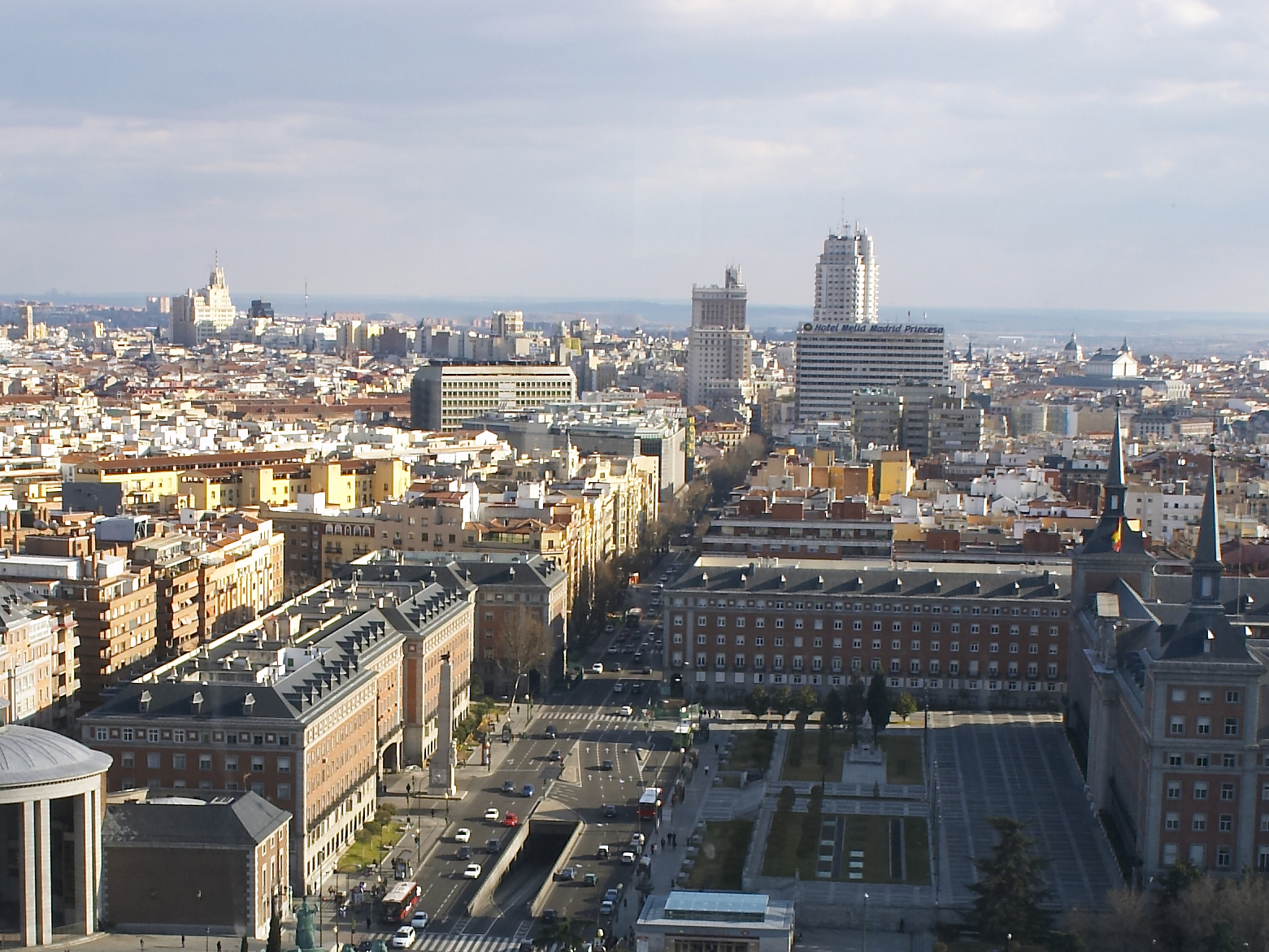
Madrid, capital of Spain

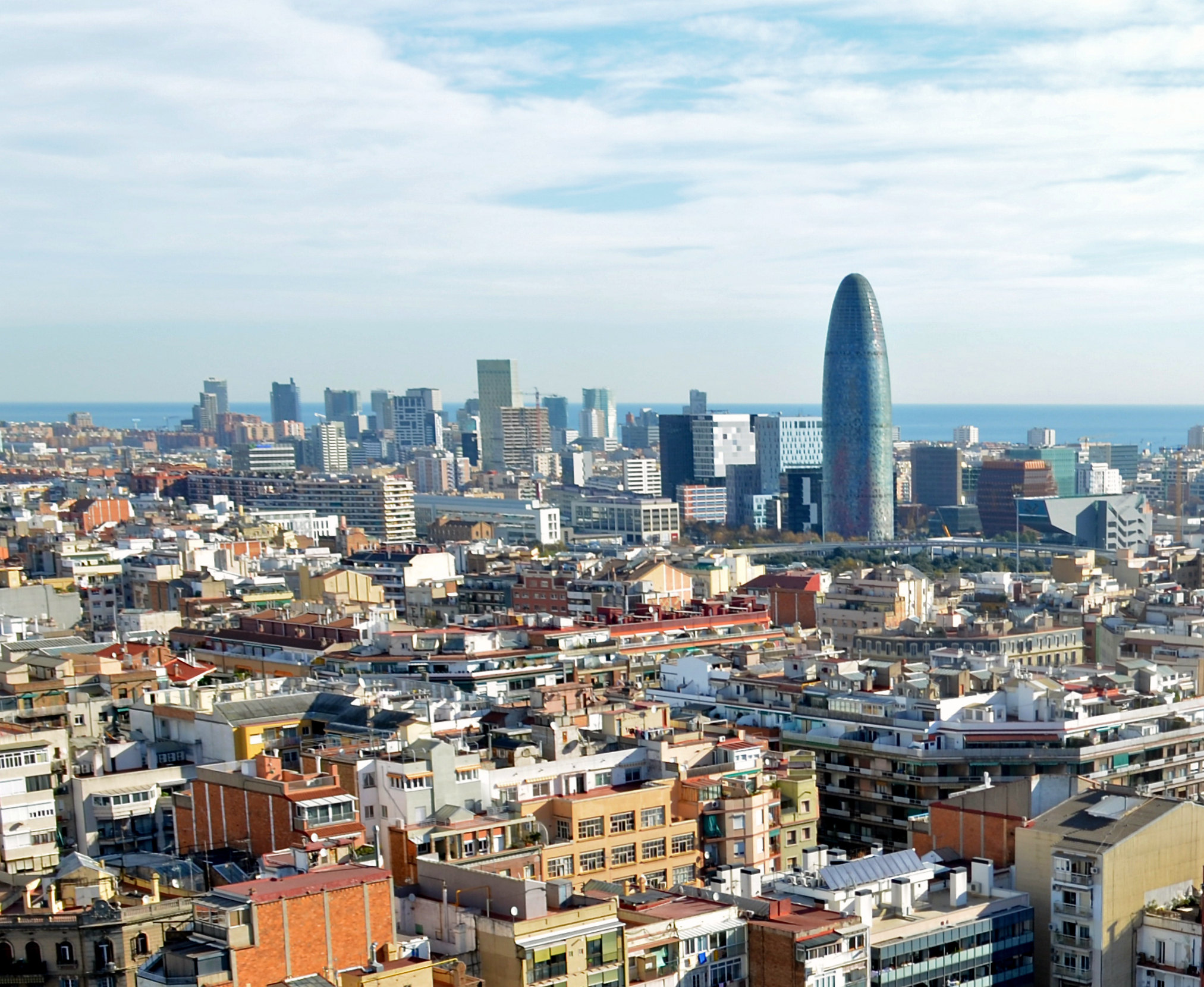
Barcelona

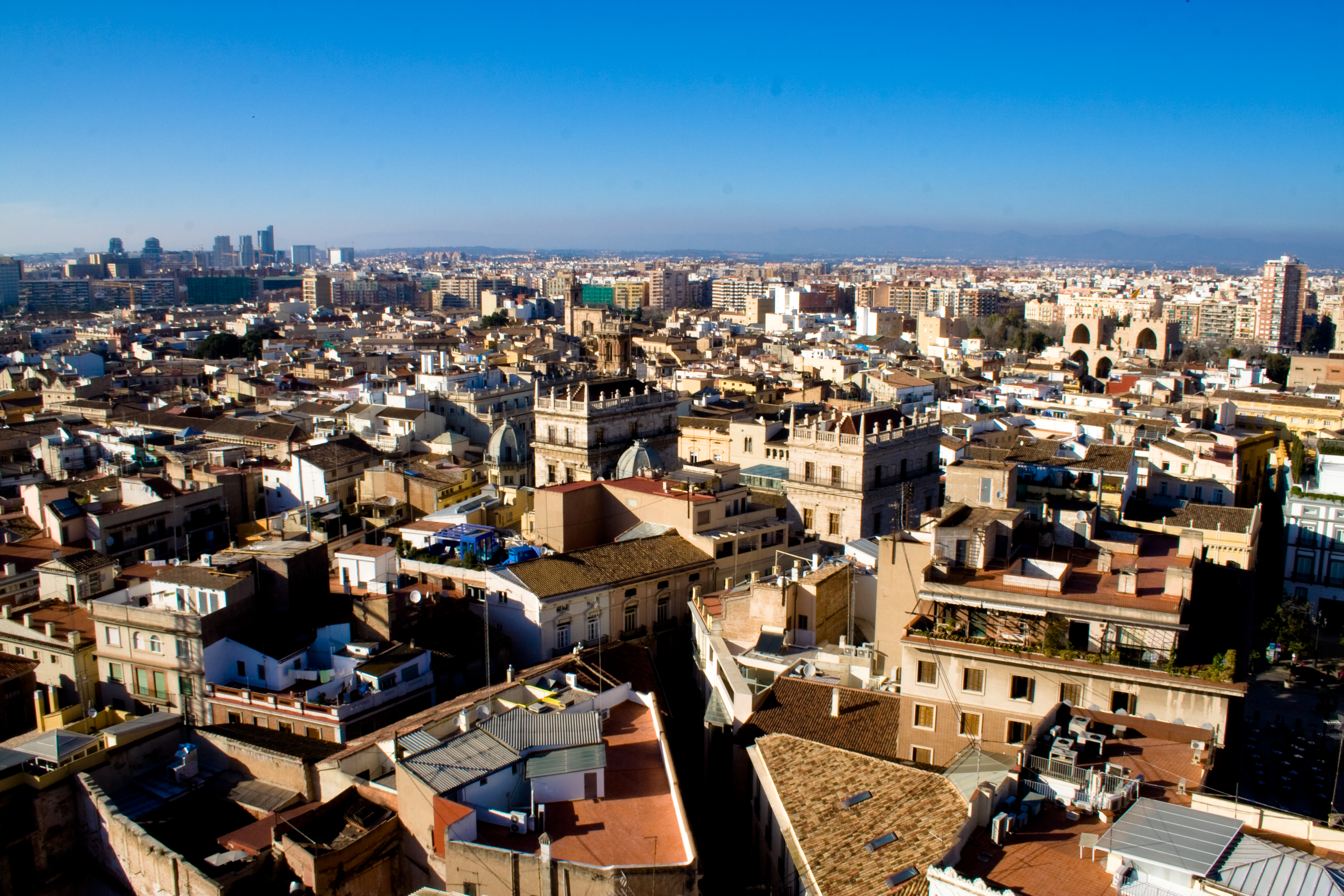
Valencia

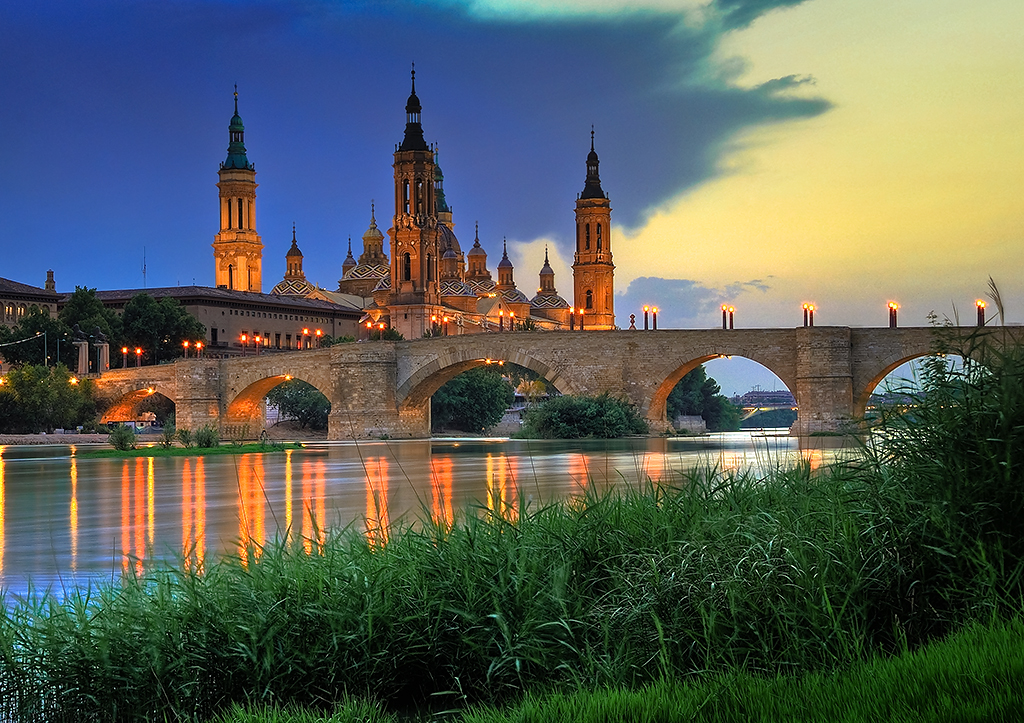
Zaragoza

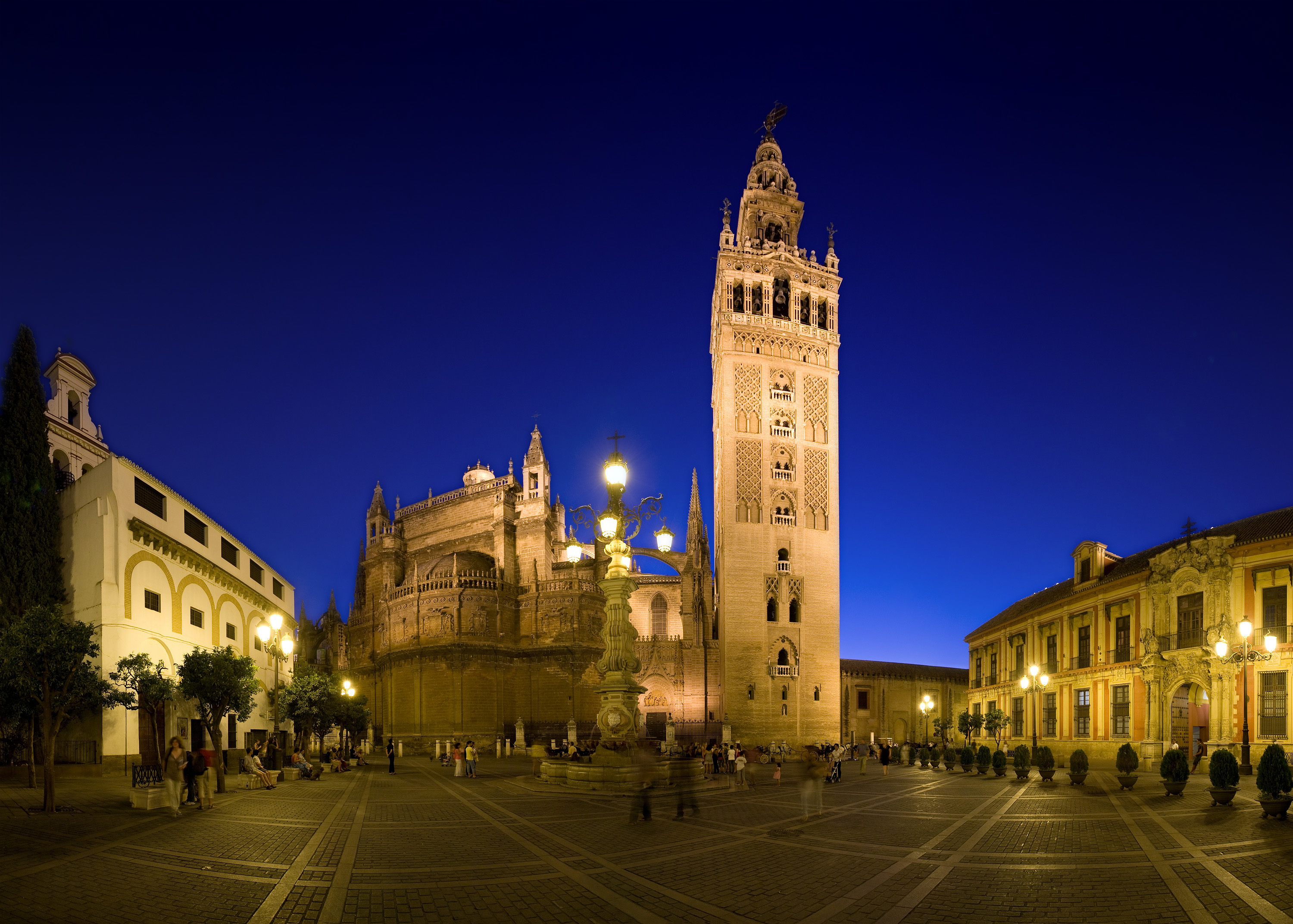
Sevilla

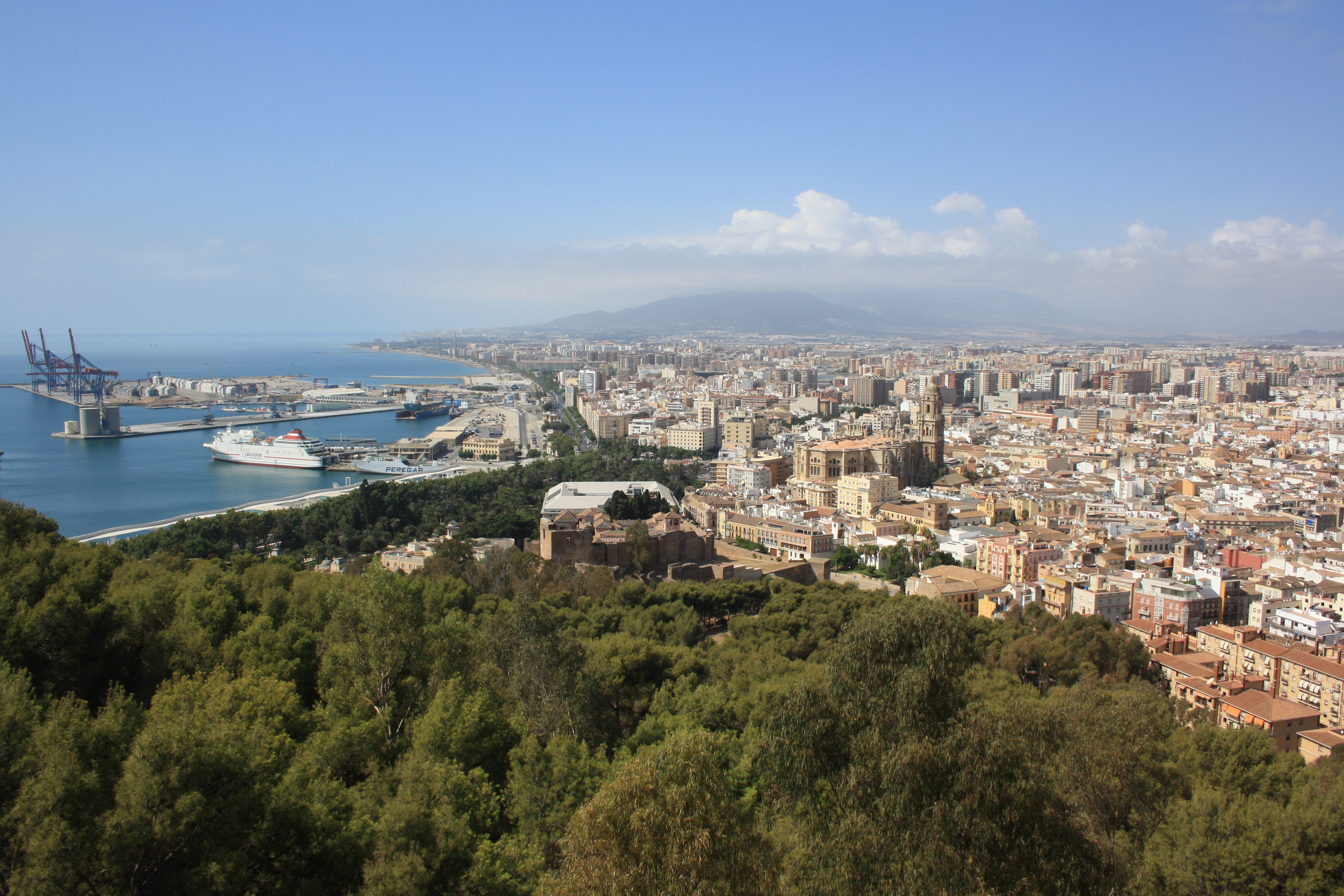
Málaga

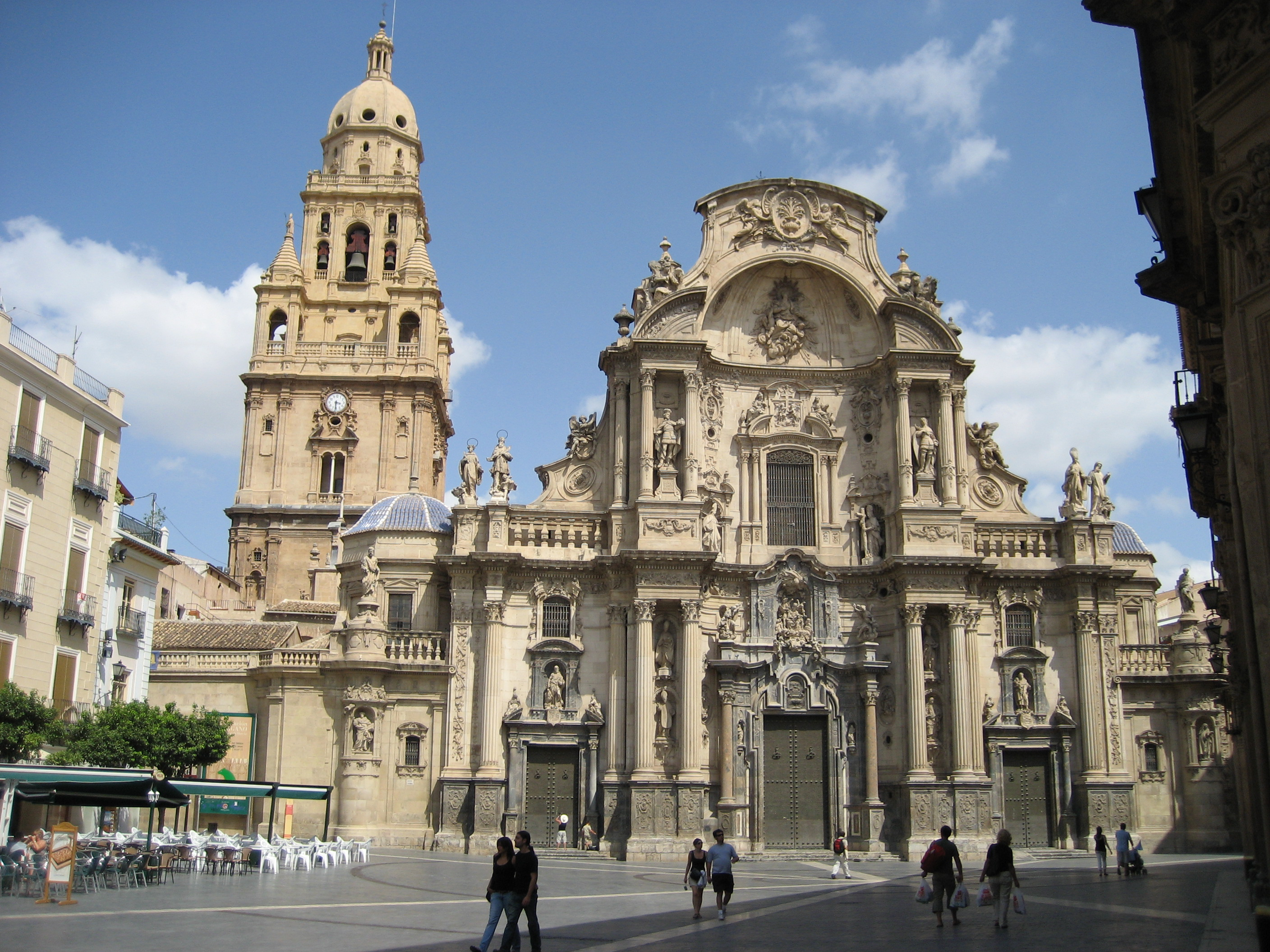
Murcia

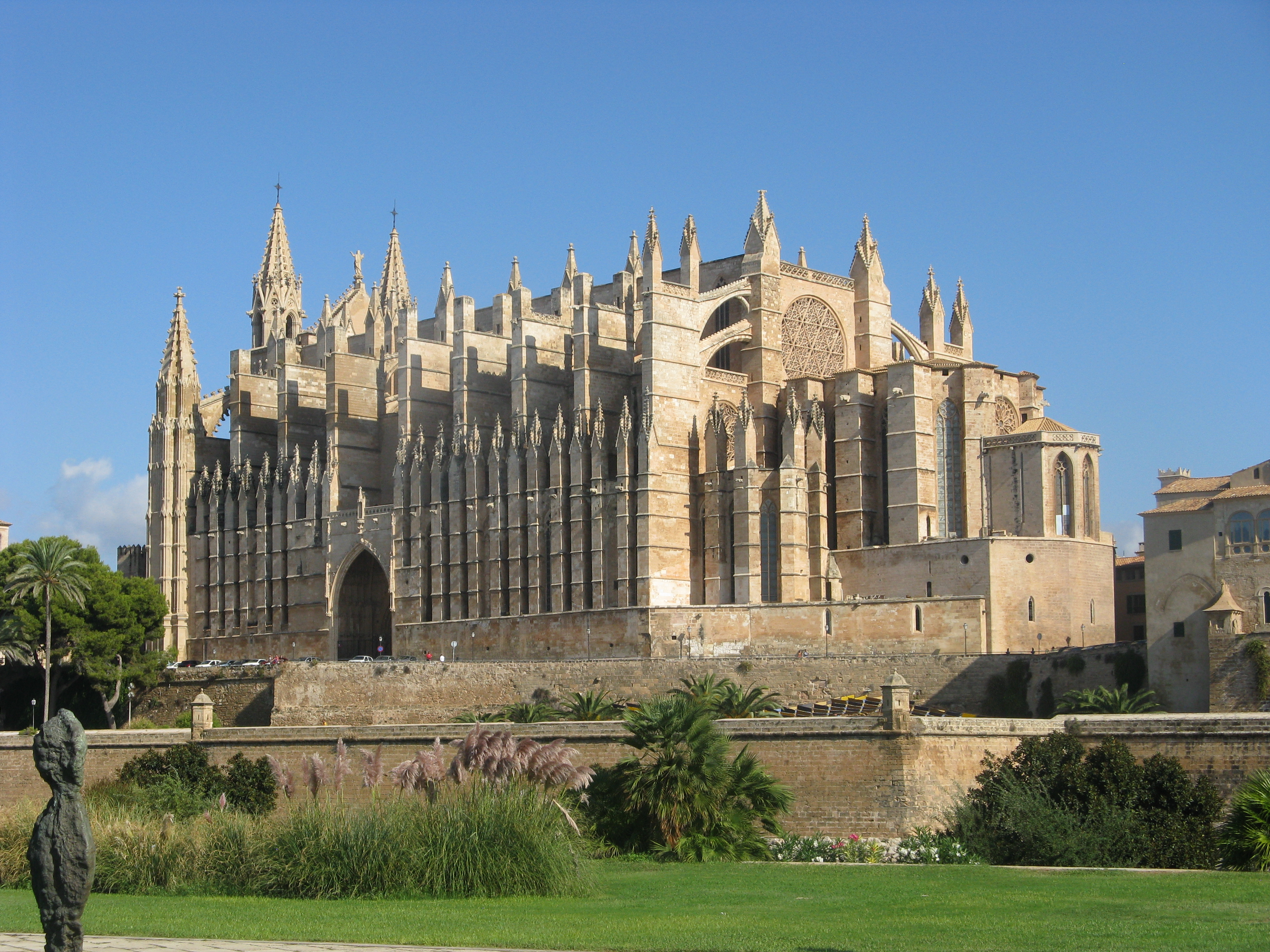
Palma

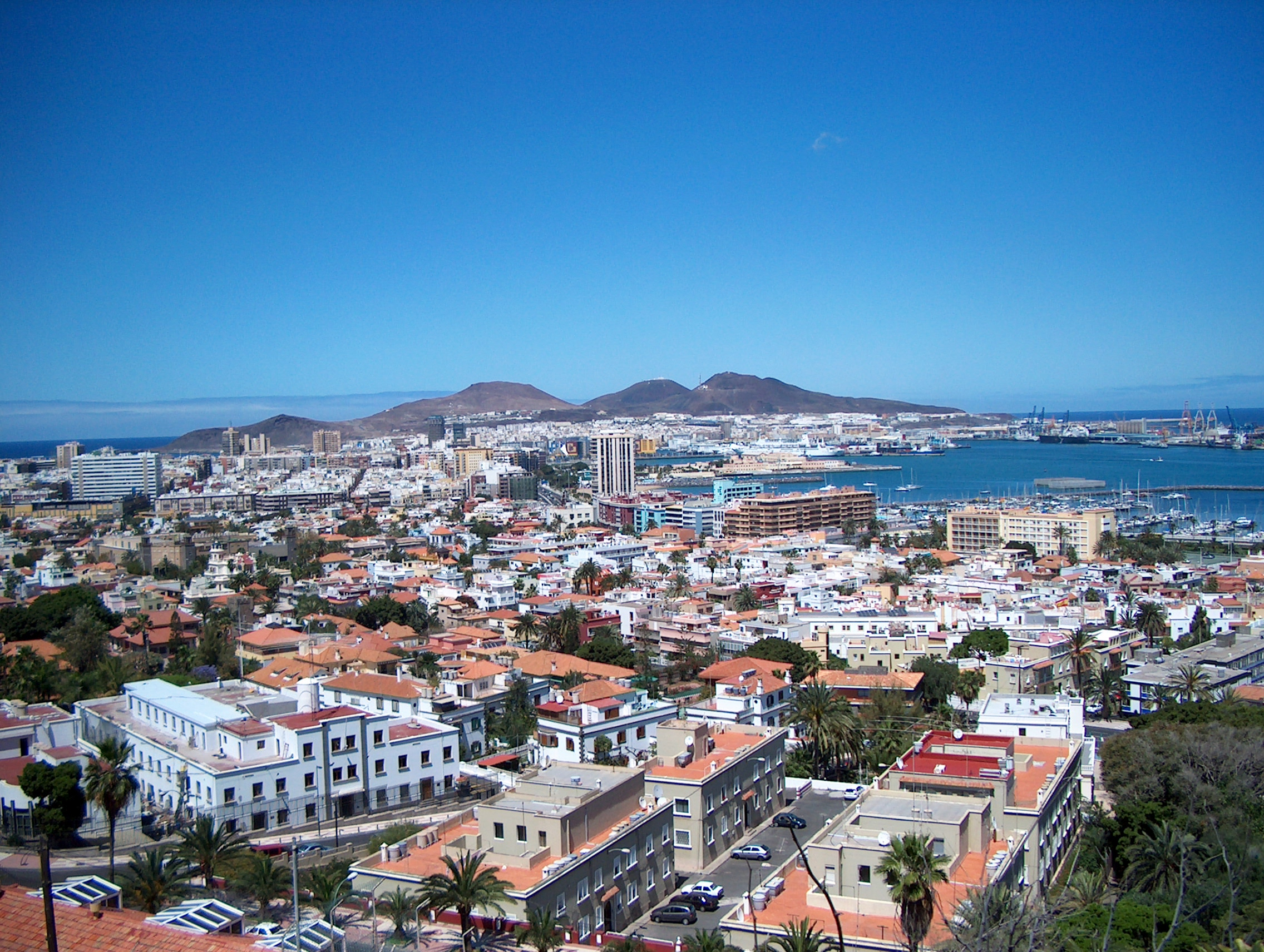
Las Palmas

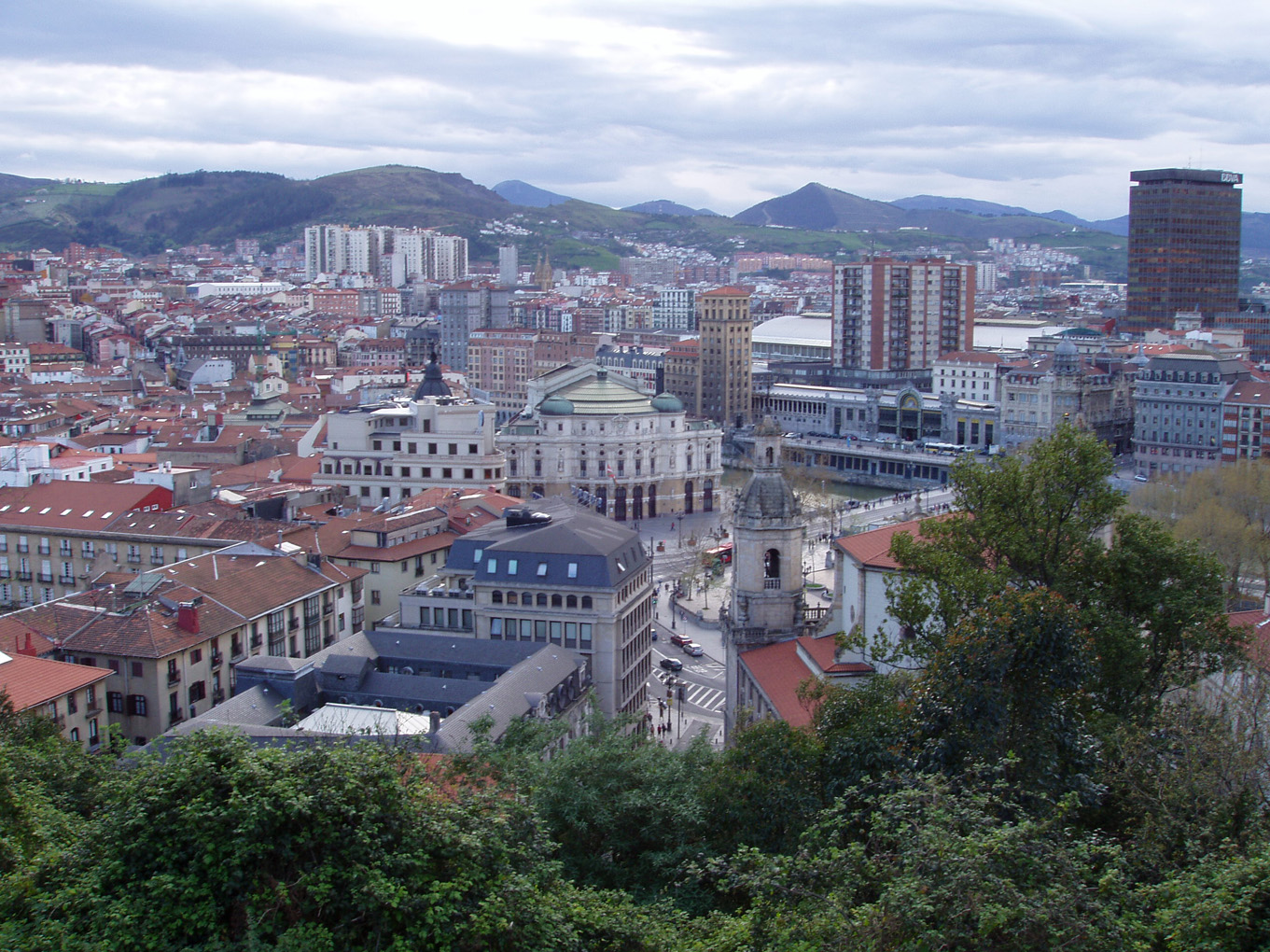
Bilbao

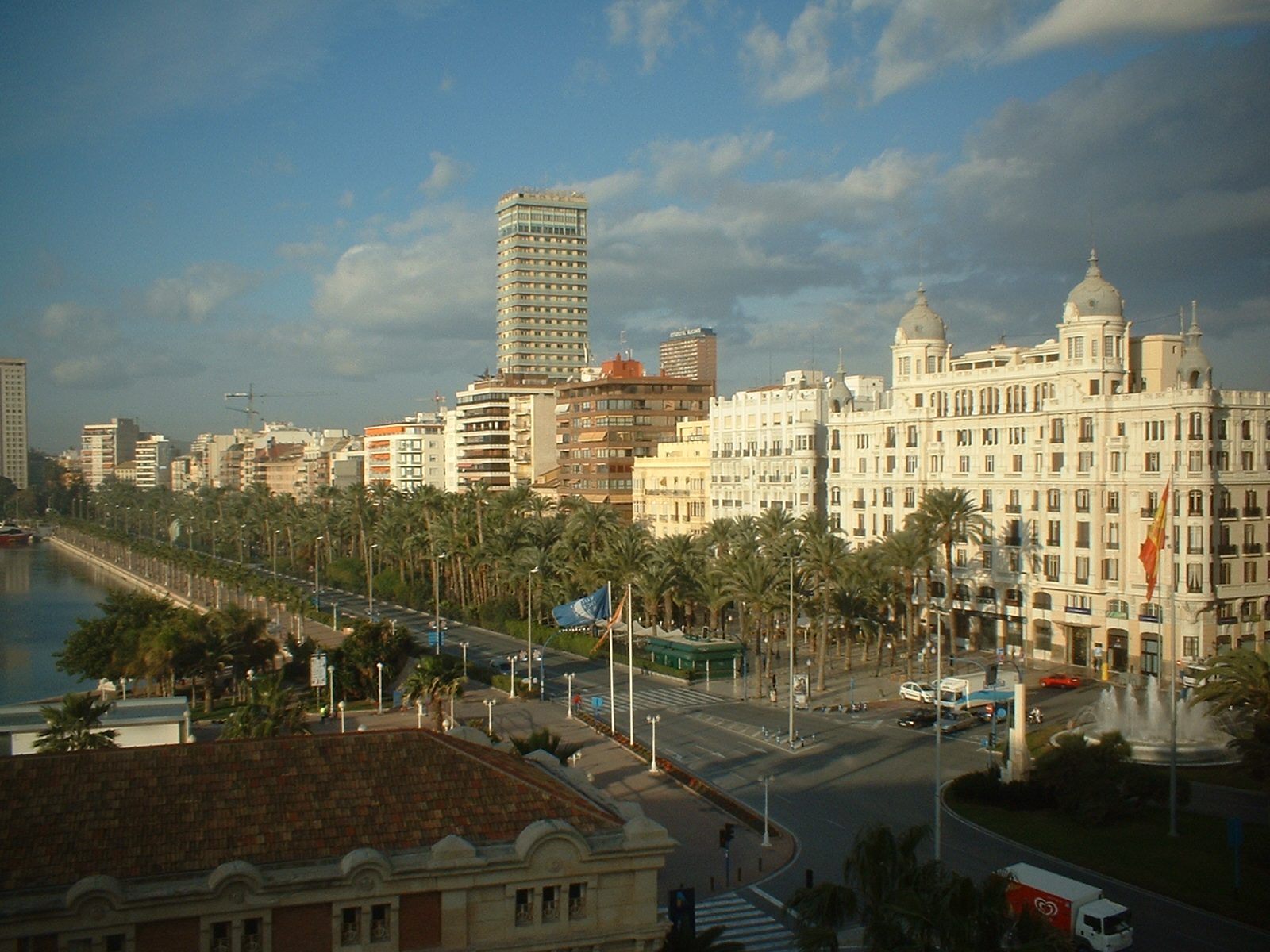
Alicante

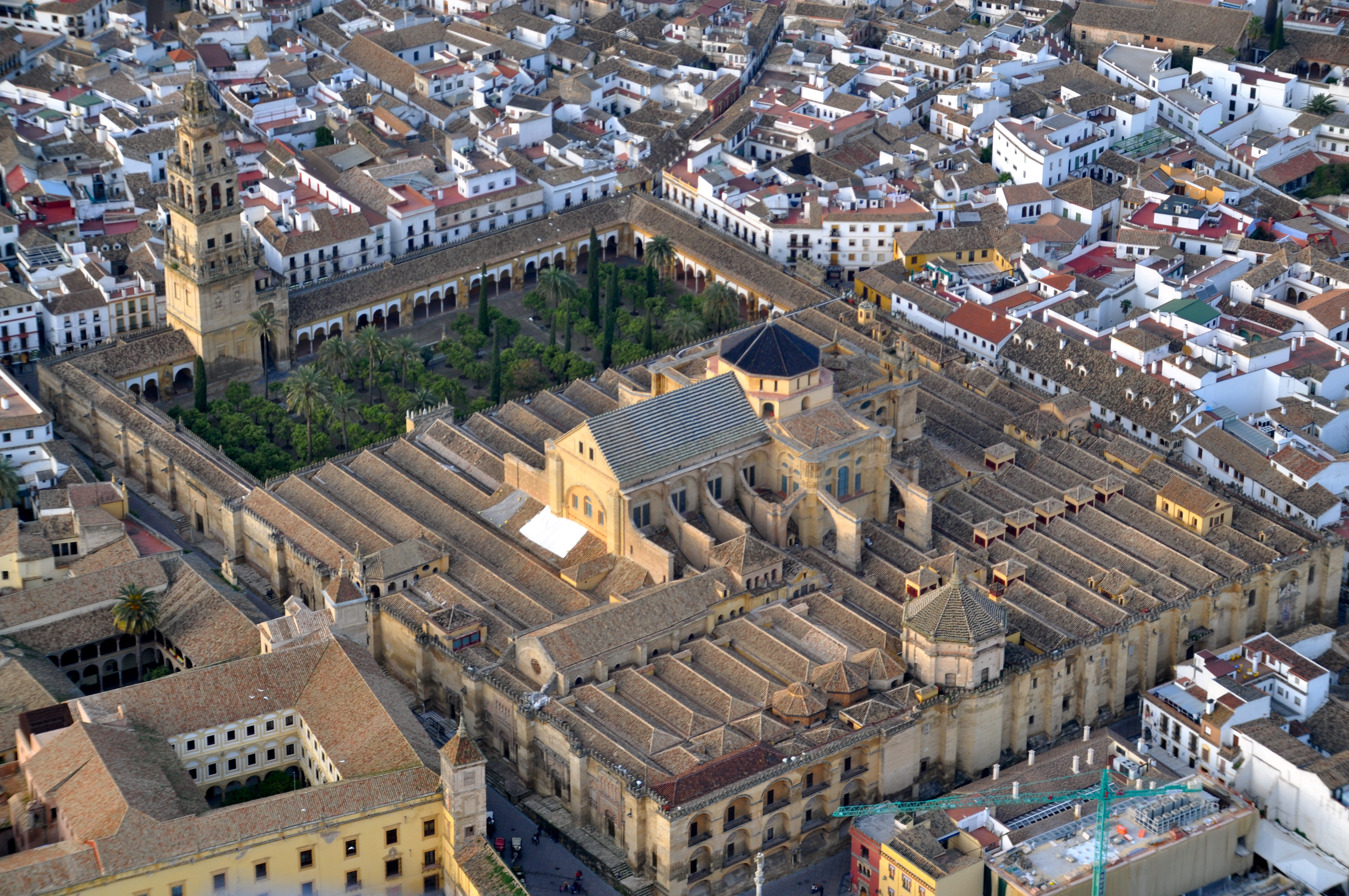
Córdoba

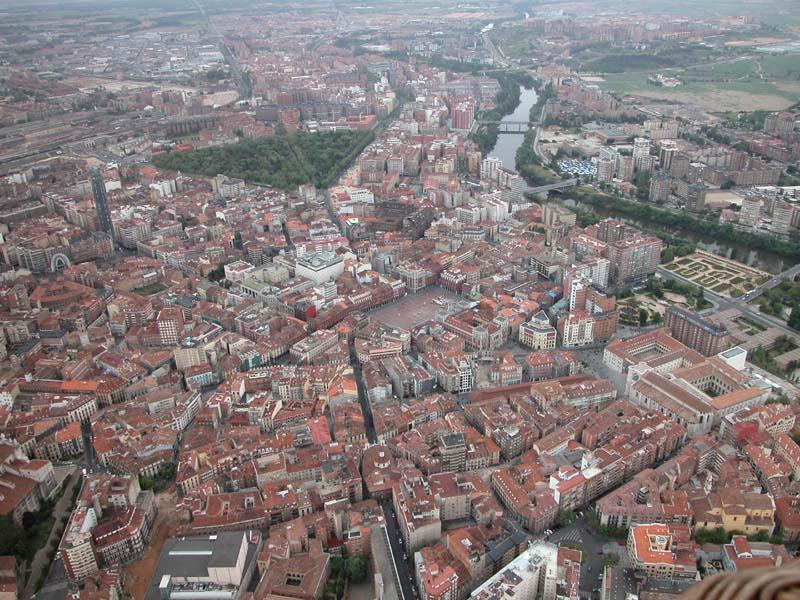
Valladolid

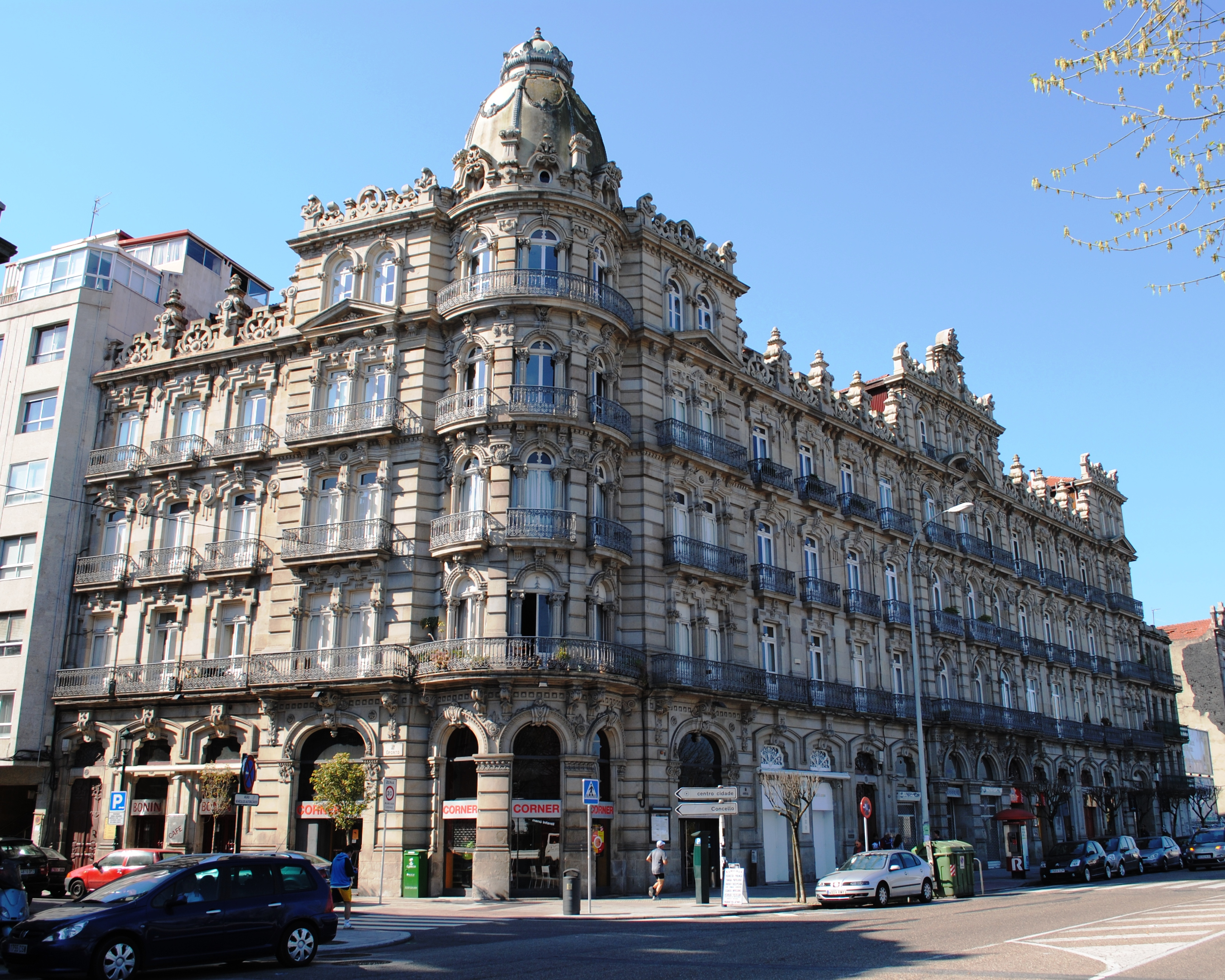
Vigo

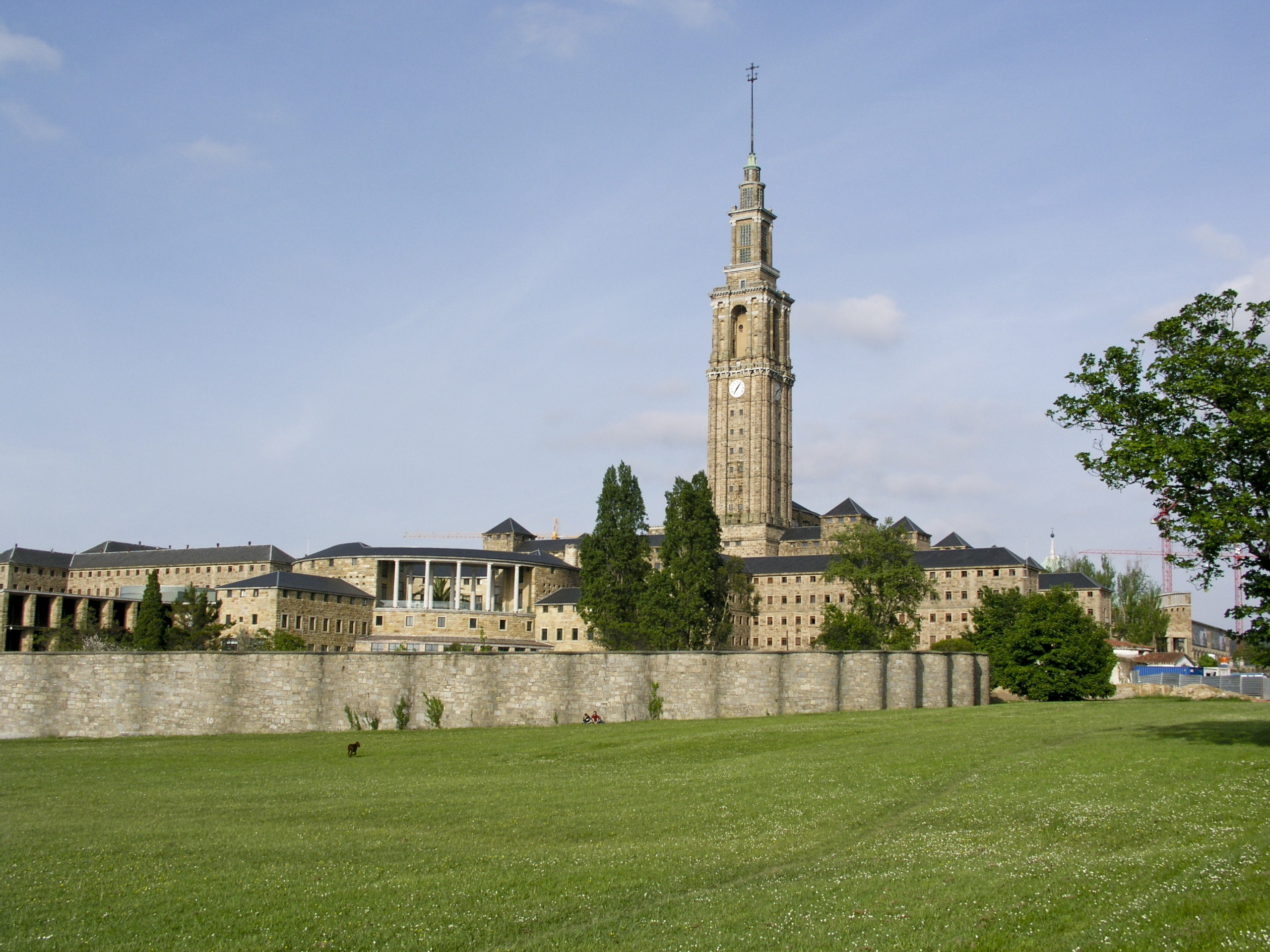
Gijón

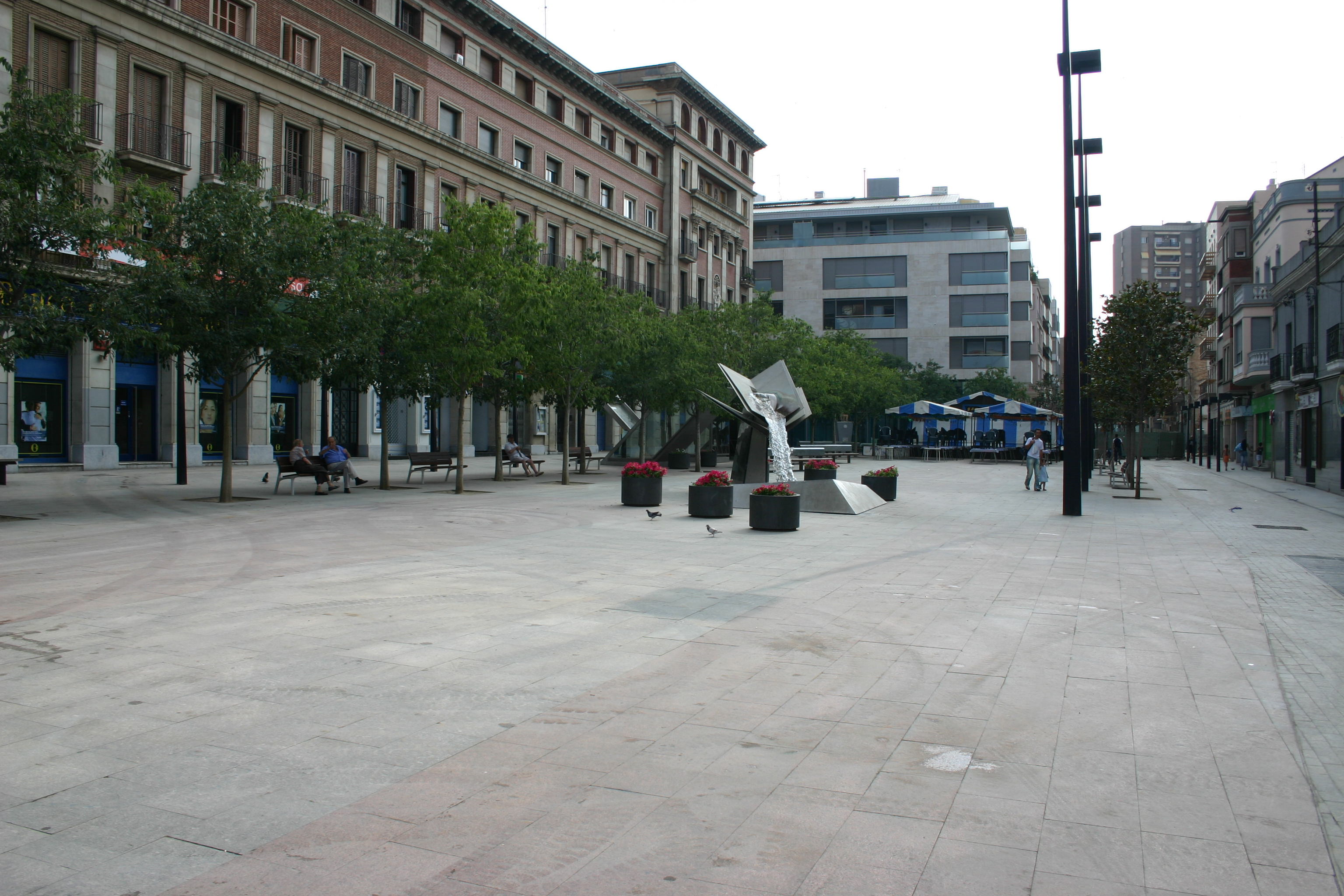
L'Hospitalet de Llobregat

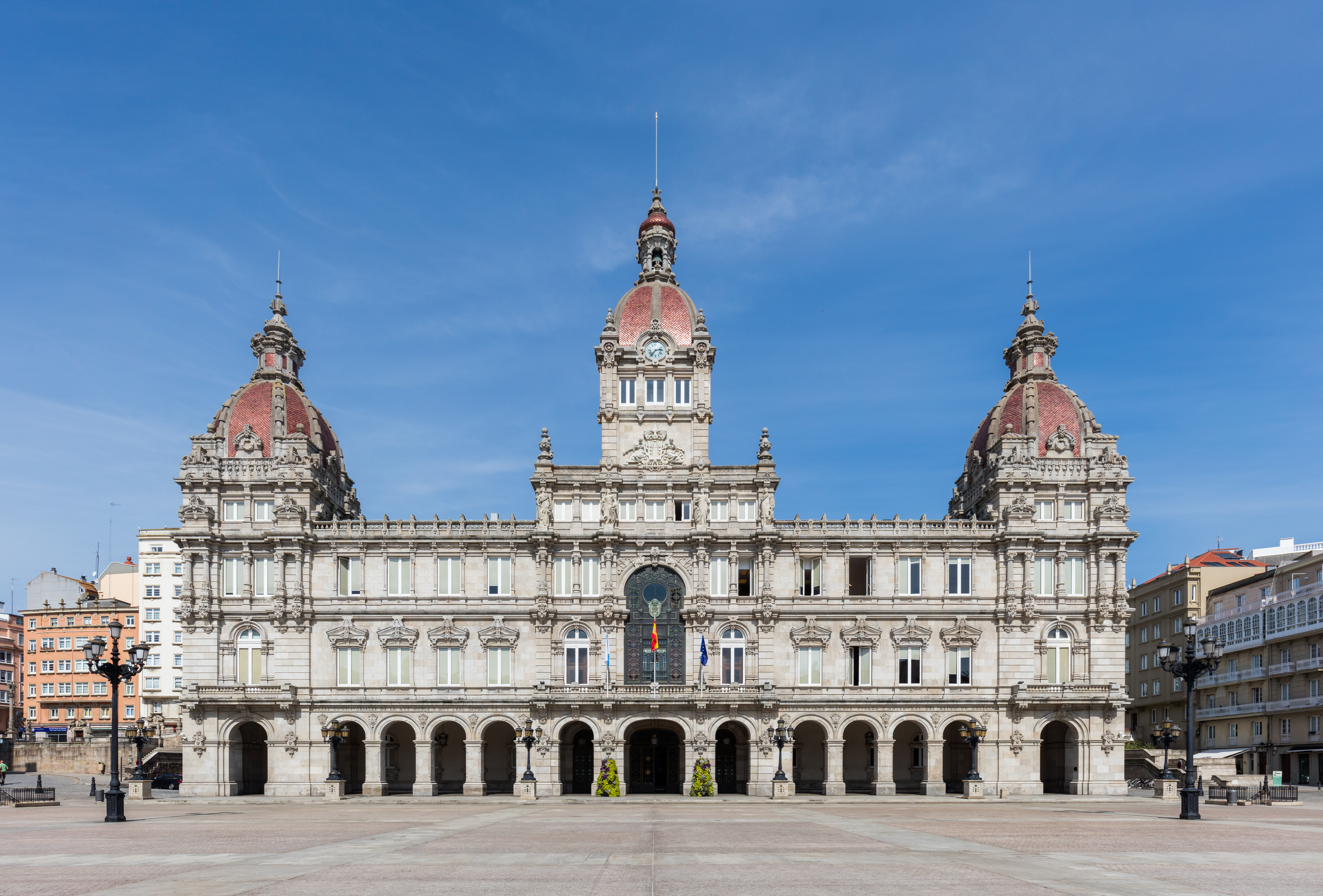
A Coruña

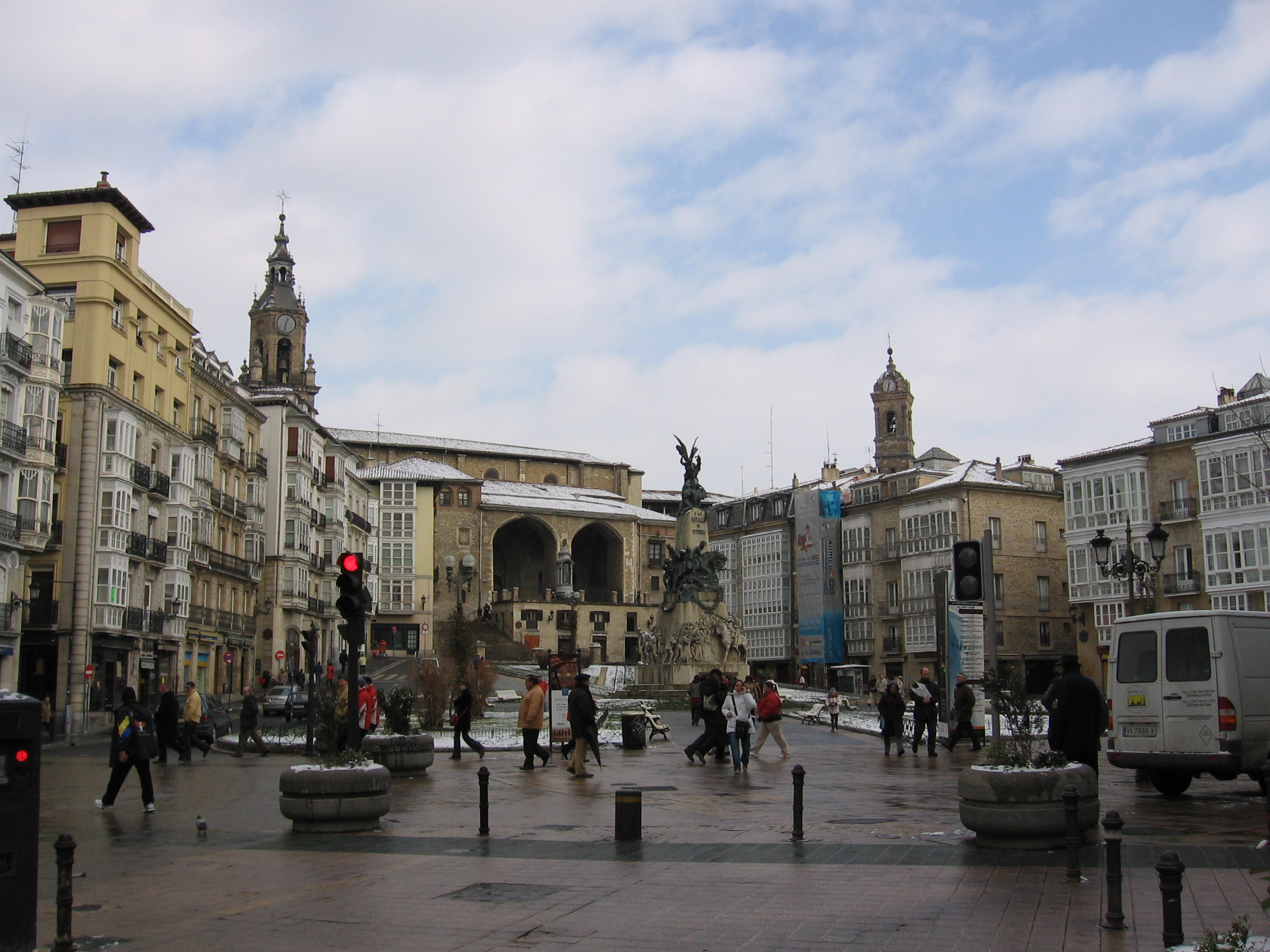
Vitoria-Gasteiz

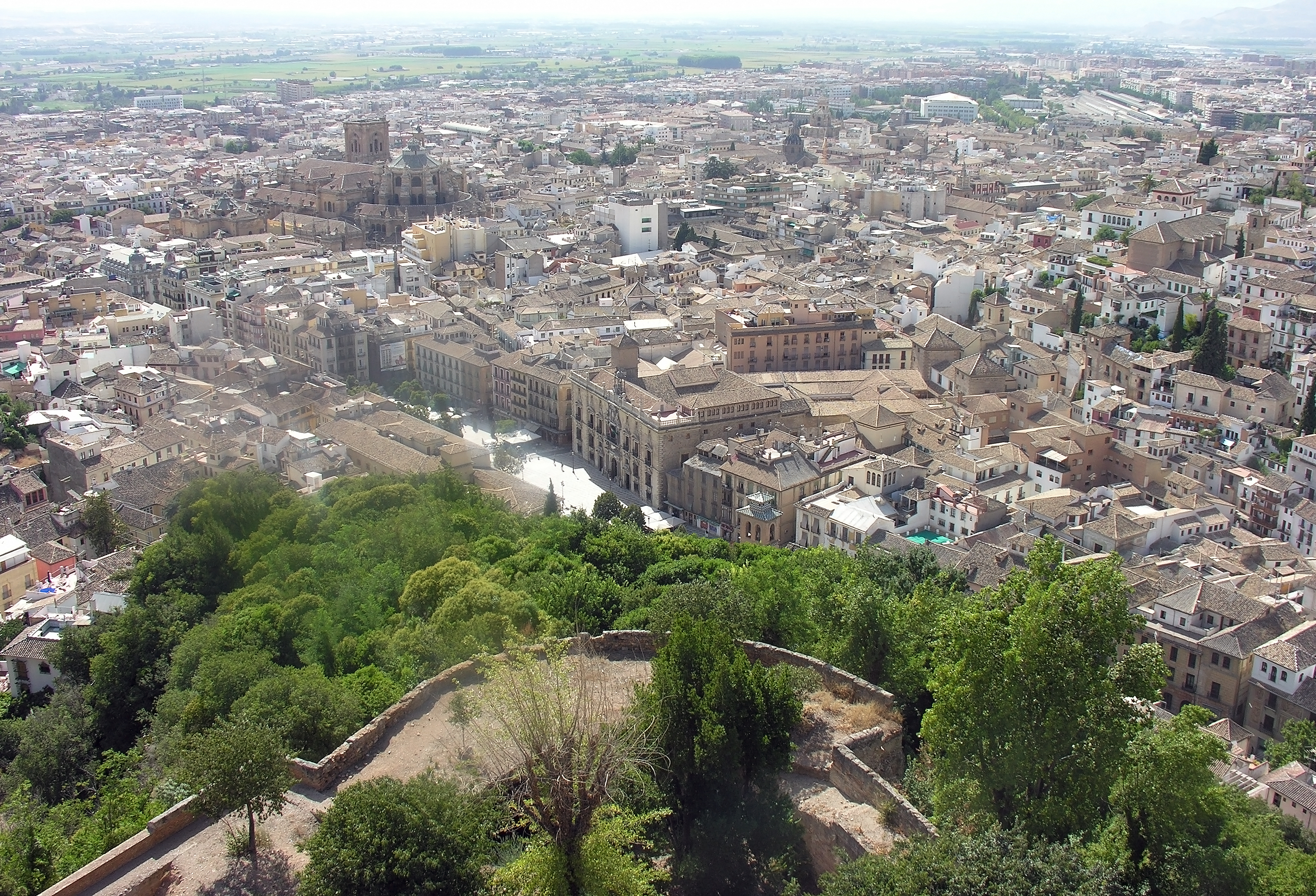
Granada

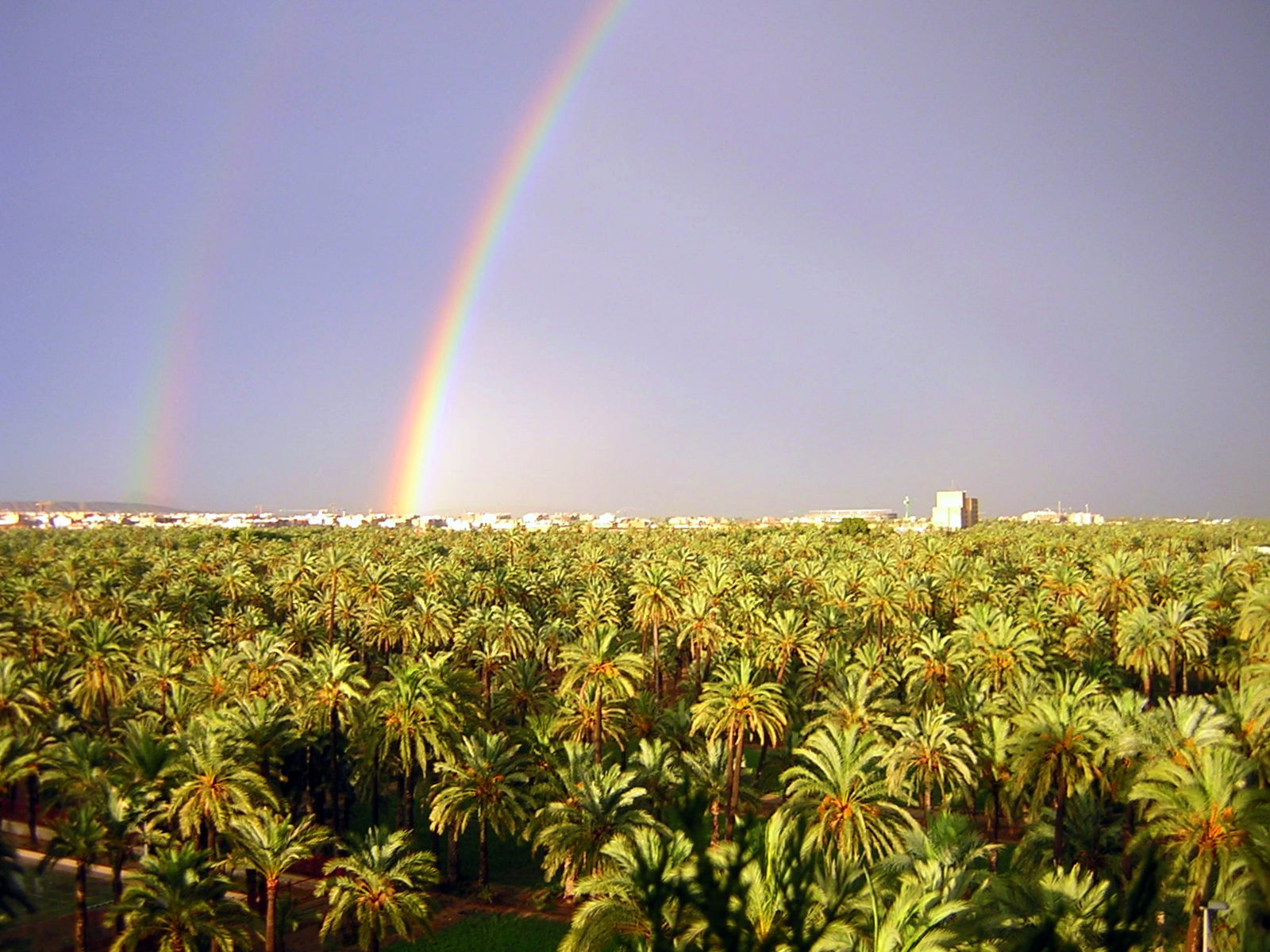
Elche

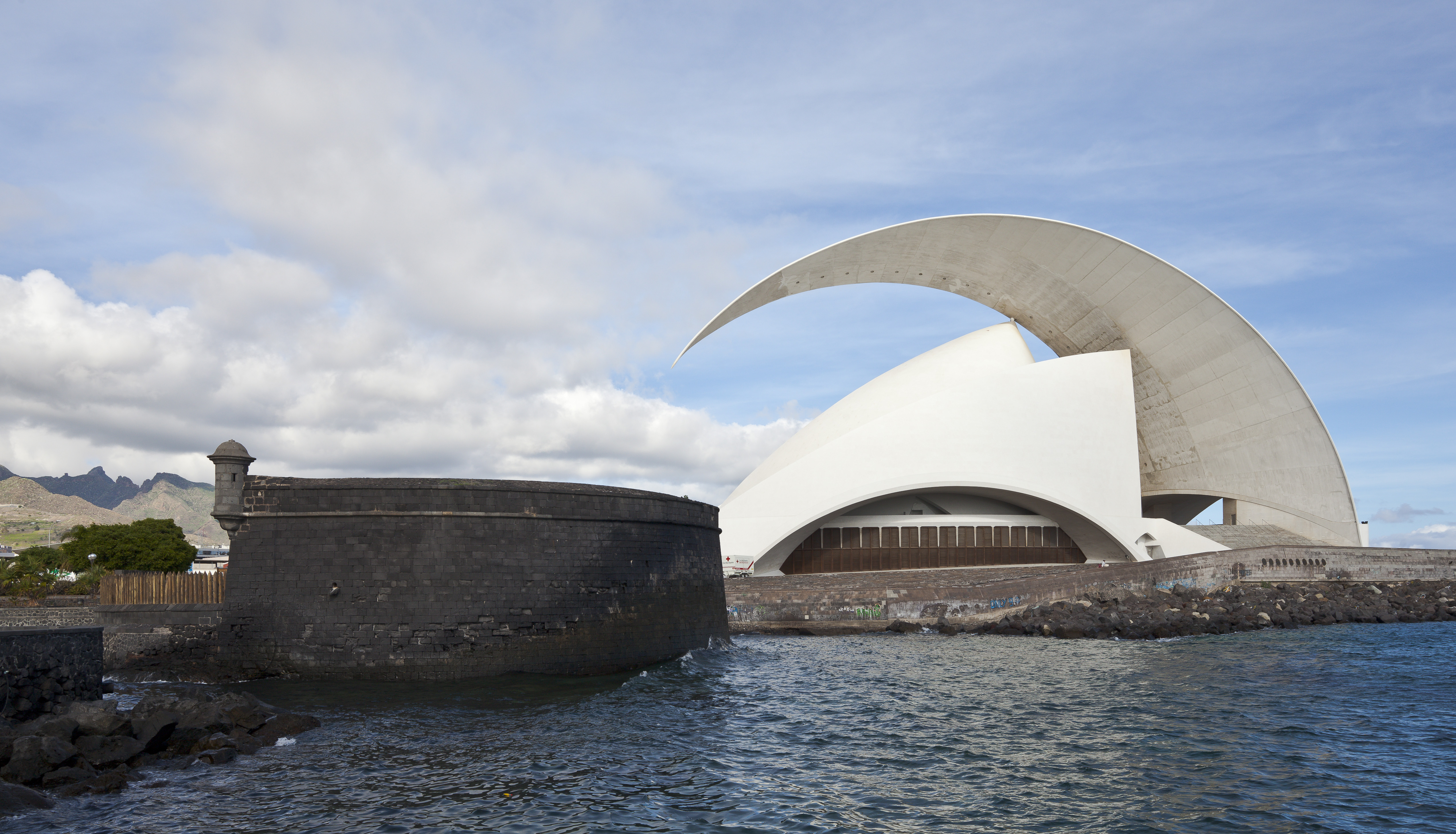
Santa Cruz de Tenerife

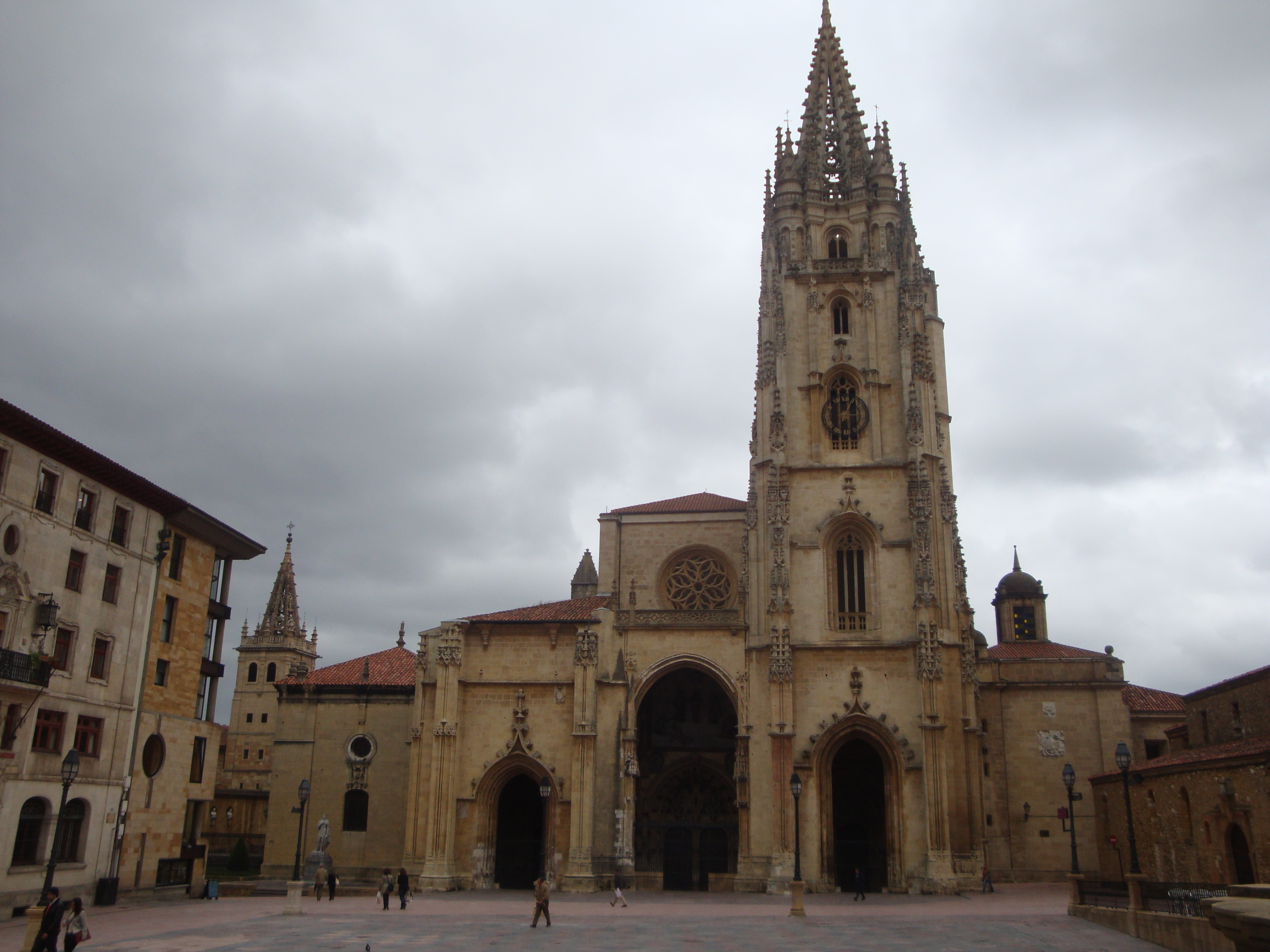
Oviedo

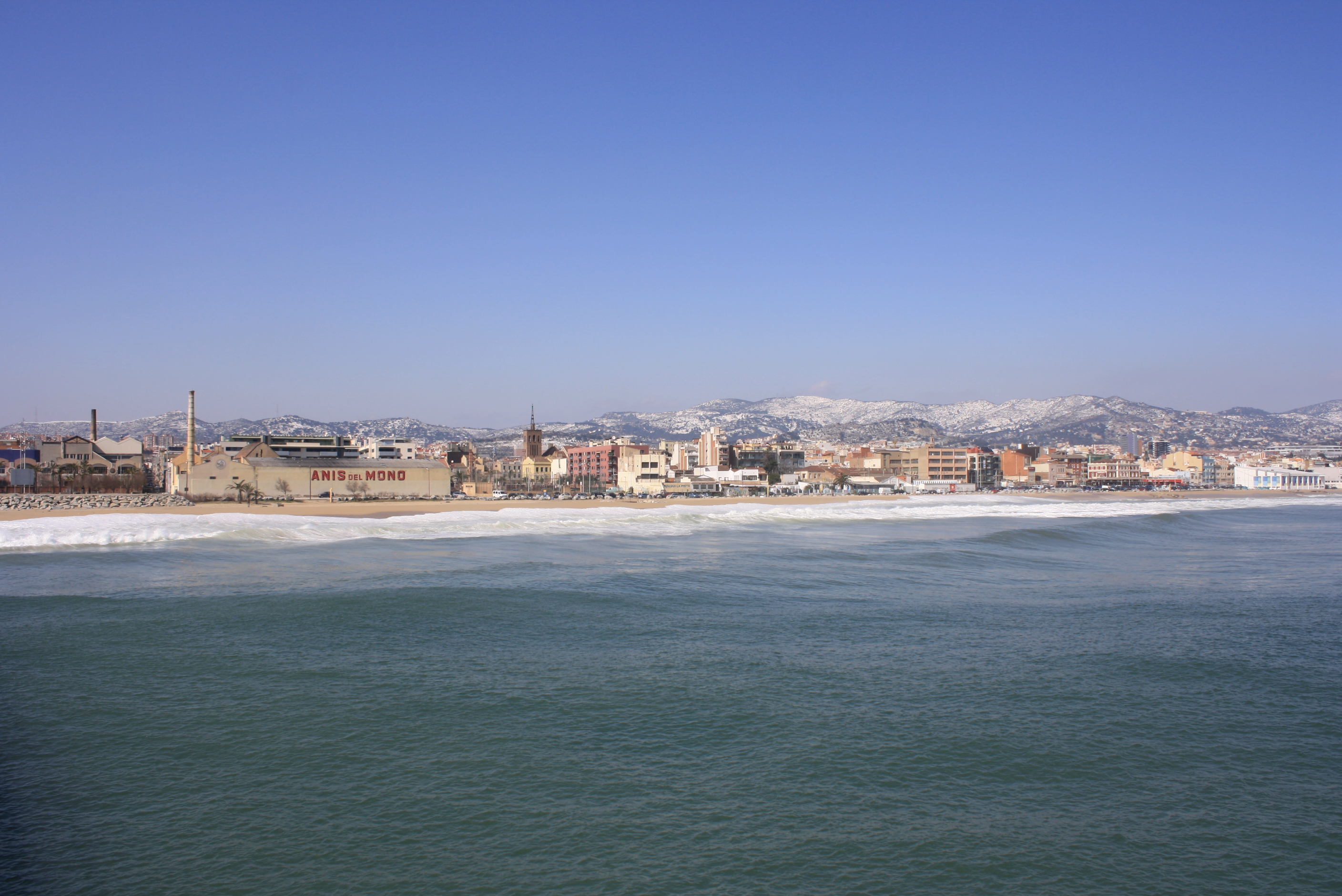
Badalona

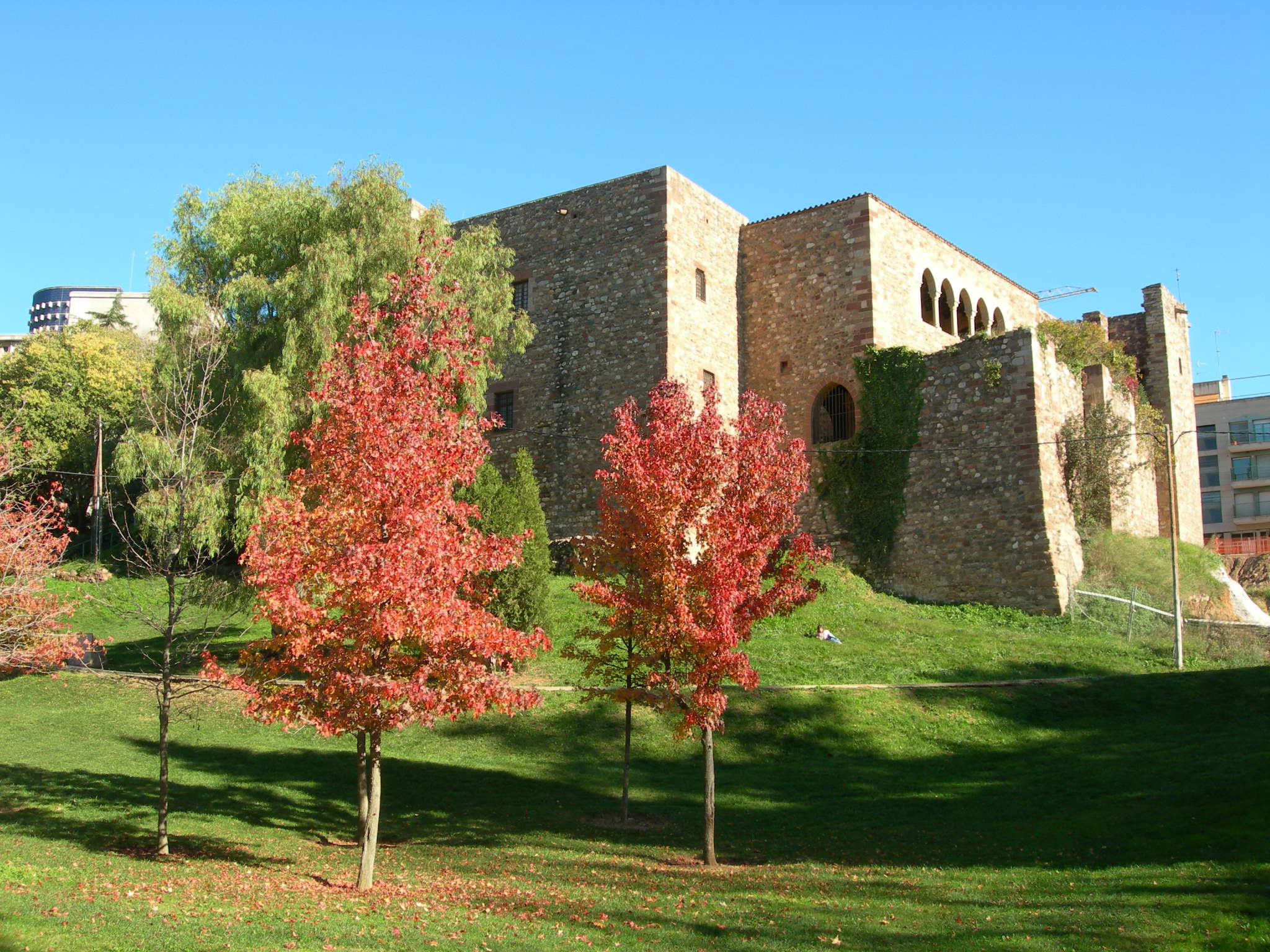
Terrassa

This article includes several ranked indicators for Spain's municipalities.

== By population ==
This list ranks the 100 most populous municipalities as of 2025.

Municipality	Province	Population
Madrid	Madrid	3,477,497
Barcelona	Barcelona	1,713,247
Valencia	Valencia	841,558
Zaragoza	Zaragoza	699,007
Seville	Seville	688,714
Málaga	Málaga	597,173
Murcia	Murcia	477,631
Palma	Balearic Islands	443,196
Las Palmas de Gran Canaria	Las Palmas	384,023
Alicante	Alicante	365,586
Bilbao	Biscay	350,975
Córdoba	Córdoba	324,159
Valladolid	Valladolid	301,798
Vigo	Pontevedra	295,735
L'Hospitalet de Llobregat	Barcelona	292,161
Gijón	Asturias	271,259
Vitoria-Gasteiz	Álava	260,402
A Coruña	A Coruña	251,277
Elche/Elx	Alicante	245,575
Granada	Granada	235,294
Terrassa	Barcelona	232,676
Badalona	Barcelona	230,642
Sabadell	Barcelona	224,589
Oviedo	Asturias	223,576
Cartagena	Murcia	220,400
Jerez de la Frontera	Cádiz	215,025
Móstoles	Madrid	214,293
Santa Cruz de Tenerife	Santa Cruz de Tenerife	211,498
Pamplona	Navarre	209,676
Almería	Almería	204,772
Alcalá de Henares	Madrid	202,549
Leganés	Madrid	195,946
Getafe	Madrid	195,628
Fuenlabrada	Madrid	189,814
Donostia/San Sebastián	Gipuzkoa	189,507
Castellón de la Plana	Castellón	183,709
Burgos	Burgos	178,370
Alcorcón	Madrid	176,806
Santander	Cantabria	175,082
Albacete	Albacete	175,068
San Cristóbal de La Laguna	Santa Cruz de Tenerife	161,927
Marbella	Málaga	160,478
Logroño	La Rioja	151,681
Badajoz	Badajoz	150,870
Lleida	Lleida	147,369
Salamanca	Salamanca	145,583
Torrejón de Ardoz	Madrid	144,211
Huelva	Huelva	143,774
Tarragona	Tarragona	143,260
Dos Hermanas	Seville	142,463
Parla	Madrid	138,012
Mataró	Barcelona	131,370
Algeciras	Cádiz	126,500
León	León	124,091
Santa Coloma de Gramenet	Barcelona	123,250
Alcobendas	Madrid	123,222
Jaén	Jaén	112,119
Reus	Tarragona	111,911
Cádiz	Cádiz	110,123
Roquetas de Mar	Almería	110,054
Girona	Girona	108,352
Ourense	Ourense	105,609
Telde	Las Palmas	104,933
Rivas-Vaciamadrid	Madrid	103,243
Barakaldo	Biscay	103,084
Santiago de Compostela	A Coruña	100,842
Torrevieja	Alicante	100,470
Lugo	Lugo	100,071
Las Rozas de Madrid	Madrid	99,579
Lorca	Murcia	98,613
Sant Cugat del Vallès	Barcelona	97,959
San Sebastián de los Reyes	Madrid	97,330
Cáceres	Cáceres	96,598
Mijas	Málaga	94,320
San Fernando	Cádiz	93,490
Guadalajara	Guadalajara	92,798
Cornellà de Llobregat	Barcelona	92,255
Torrent	Valencia	91,353
Chiclana de la Frontera	Cádiz	90,997
El Ejido	Almería	90,617
El Puerto de Santa María	Cádiz	90,242
Pozuelo de Alarcón	Madrid	89,474
Arona	Santa Cruz de Tenerife	89,036
Vélez-Málaga	Málaga	87,798
Toledo	Toledo	87,074
Melilla	Melilla	87,067
Valdemoro	Madrid	86,078
Sant Boi de Llobregat	Barcelona	85,317
Fuengirola	Málaga	84,857
Talavera de la Reina	Toledo	84,413
Orihuela	Alicante	84,279
Ceuta	Ceuta	83,567
Pontevedra	Pontevedra	83,339
Gandia	Valencia	82,909
Rubí	Barcelona	82,825
Manresa	Barcelona	80,692
Coslada	Madrid	80,365
Estepona	Málaga	79,593
Santa Lucía de Tirajana	Las Palmas	79,506
Benalmádena	Málaga	78,787

== By surface area ==
This list ranks the 100 largest municipalities by surface area.

Municipality	Province	Area (km^{2})
Cáceres	Cáceres	1,750.23
Lorca	Murcia	1,675.27
Badajoz	Badajoz	1,440.52
Córdoba	Córdoba	1,254.45
Almodóvar del Campo	Ciudad Real	1,207.90
Jerez de la Frontera	Cádiz	1,188.62
Albacete	Albacete	1,126.99
Écija	Seville	978.23
Zaragoza	Zaragoza	974.00
Jumilla	Murcia	969.66
Andújar	Jaén	963.60
Moratalla	Murcia	952.94
Carmona	Seville	922.07
Cuenca	Cuenca	909.20
Hornachuelos	Córdoba	893.37
Murcia	Murcia	885.11
Mérida	Badajoz	864.66
Villarrobledo	Albacete	862.39
Caravaca de la Cruz	Murcia	860.20
Almonte	Huelva	859.65
Cangas del Narcea	Asturias	823.58
Requena	Valencia	814.40
Hellín	Albacete	779.29
Antequera	Málaga	748.03
Jerez de los Caballeros	Badajoz	739.93
Alburquerque	Badajoz	723.48
Santiago-Pontones	Jaén	682.34
Chinchilla de Monte-Aragón	Albacete	679.27
Los Yébenes	Toledo	676.16
Alcázar de San Juan	Ciudad Real	666.50
Retuerta del Bullaque	Ciudad Real	654.83
Utrera	Seville	651.21
Trujillo	Cáceres	649.53
Mula	Murcia	634.08
Ejea de los Caballeros	Zaragoza	613.51
Madrid	Madrid	605.77
Yecla	Murcia	605.28
Níjar	Almería	599.77
Alía	Cáceres	599.18
Valencia de Alcántara	Cáceres	594.78
Osuna	Seville	592.46
Fuente Obejuna	Córdoba	591.39
Sabiñánigo	Huesca	586.82
Montoro	Córdoba	585.42
Alhambra	Ciudad Real	579.63
Piedrabuena	Ciudad Real	565.36
Cartagena	Murcia	560.19
Don Benito	Badajoz	559.37
Alcántara	Cáceres	552.01
Baza	Granada	545.39
Tineo	Asturias	540.83
Viso del Marqués	Ciudad Real	533.20
Almansa	Albacete	532.41
Hinojosa del Duque	Córdoba	531.47
Arcos de la Frontera	Cádiz	526.37
Puebla de Don Fadrique	Granada	522.69
Cardeña	Córdoba	513.78
Yeste	Albacete	513.19
Caspe	Zaragoza	503.15
El Bonillo	Albacete	502.87
Aroche	Huelva	498.13
Azuaga	Badajoz	497.89
Valdepeñas	Ciudad Real	489.26
Medina Sidonia	Cádiz	488.46
Constantina	Seville	481.32
Alcalá de los Gazules	Cádiz	478.94
Cabeza del Buey	Badajoz	475.02
Manzanares	Ciudad Real	473.82
Huéscar	Granada	472.86
Alcañiz	Teruel	472.12
Villaviciosa de Córdoba	Córdoba	469.93
Albarracín	Teruel	468.74
Aznalcázar	Seville	449.62
Loja	Granada	447.49
Ayora	Valencia	446.47
Arcos de Jalón	Soria	441.40
Vélez-Blanco	Almería	441.32
Teruel	Teruel	440.41
A Fonsagrada	Lugo	438.42
Daimiel	Ciudad Real	438.06
Fraga	Huesca	437.81
Espiel	Córdoba	437.27
Nerpio	Albacete	436.32
Castuera	Badajoz	432.36
Morón de la Frontera	Seville	432.04
Olivenza	Badajoz	431.00
Villanueva de Córdoba	Córdoba	429.52
Cúllar	Granada	427.53
Puebla de Don Rodrigo	Ciudad Real	424.87
Jaén	Jaén	424.23
Abenójar	Ciudad Real	423.43
Alhama de Granada	Granada	419.60
Tarifa	Cádiz	419.18
Morella	Castellón	413.54
Calzada de Calatrava	Ciudad Real	410.82
San Esteban de Gormaz	Soria	406.71
Jaca	Huesca	406.50
Tauste	Zaragoza	405.18
Úbeda	Jaén	403.77
Torre de Juan Abad	Ciudad Real	399.19

== By population density ==
This list ranks the 100 most densely populated municipalities as of 2025, by inhabitants per square kilometer.

Municipality	Province	Population density (inhabitants/km^{2})
Emperador	Valencia	23,600.0
Mislata	Valencia	23,154.2
Benetússer	Valencia	21,485.9
L'Hospitalet de Llobregat	Barcelona	21,482.4
Santa Coloma de Gramenet	Barcelona	17,383.6
Barcelona	Barcelona	17,016.8
Premià de Mar	Barcelona	14,973.5
Portugalete	Biscay	14,287.9
Barañain	Navarre	14,092.1
Badia del Vallès	Barcelona	14,040.9
Llocnou de la Corona	Valencia	13,400.0
Cornellà de Llobregat	Barcelona	13,389.7
Tavernes Blanques	Valencia	12,550.0
Burjassot	Valencia	12,064.5
Badalona	Barcelona	11,003.9
Esplugues de Llobregat	Barcelona	10,713.3
Burlada – Burlata	Navarre	10,061.1
Sant Adrià de Besòs	Barcelona	9,994.9
Villava – Atarrabia	Navarre	9,356.6
Ripollet	Barcelona	9,039.3
Cádiz	Cádiz	8,953.1
Bilbao	Biscay	8,490.0
Pamplona	Navarre	8,343.7
Fuengirola	Málaga	8,230.6
Sestao	Biscay	7,953.4
Castilleja de la Cuesta	Seville	7,865.4
Alaquàs	Valencia	7,863.2
El Masnou	Barcelona	7,337.4
Paiporta	Valencia	7,076.9
Coslada	Madrid	6,691.5
A Coruña	A Coruña	6,491.3
Getxo	Biscay	6,399.9
Sant Joan Despí	Barcelona	6,372.1
Xirivella	Valencia	6,284.8
Melilla	Melilla	6,114.3
Valencia	Valencia	6,040.5
Sabadell	Barcelona	5,968.3
Sedaví	Valencia	5,968.1
Armilla	Granada	5,860.6
Mataró	Barcelona	5,854.3
San Juan de Aznalfarache	Seville	5,762.9
Basauri	Biscay	5,743.5
Madrid	Madrid	5,740.6
Parla	Madrid	5,630.8
Ansoáin – Antsoain	Navarre	5,521.2
Castelldefels	Barcelona	5,440.2
Vilassar de Mar	Barcelona	5,362.1
Santurtzi	Biscay	5,245.8
Alcorcón	Madrid	5,241.8
Salt	Girona	5,234.9
Igualada	Barcelona	5,176.7
Eivissa	Balearic Islands	4,903.8
Tomares	Seville	4,899.8
Mollet del Vallès	Barcelona	4,894.2
Santander	Cantabria	4,852.6
Seville	Seville	4,850.1
Fuenlabrada	Madrid	4,816.4
Sant Andreu de la Barca	Barcelona	4,799.5
Móstoles	Madrid	4,724.3
Gines	Seville	4,678.1
Maracena	Granada	4,575.1
Leganés	Madrid	4,547.4
Caldes d'Estrac	Barcelona	4,524.3
Montgat	Barcelona	4,487.8
Torrejón de Ardoz	Madrid	4,420.9
La Llagosta	Barcelona	4,388.7
Granollers	Barcelona	4,364.8
Ceuta	Ceuta	4,205.7
Berriozar	Navarre	4,176.0
Barberà del Vallès	Barcelona	4,150.1
Barakaldo	Biscay	4,125.0
Sant Hipòlit de Voltregà	Barcelona	4,054.4
Benirredrà	Valencia	4,048.7
Lekeitio	Biscay	4,027.9
Leioa	Biscay	3,898.5
Sant Feliu de Llobregat	Barcelona	3,897.2
Bonrepòs i Mirambell	Valencia	3,884.9
Sant Boi de Llobregat	Barcelona	3,864.0
Las Palmas de Gran Canaria	Las Palmas	3,716.8
Etxebarri	Biscay	3,680.4
Salamanca	Salamanca	3,680.1
Torremolinos	Málaga	3,579.6
Puerto de la Cruz	Santa Cruz de Tenerife	3,577.5
Maleján	Zaragoza	3,525.0
Rocafort	Valencia	3,395.7
Cájar	Granada	3,319.3
Terrassa	Barcelona	3,317.8
Viladecans	Barcelona	3,317.1
Zizur Mayor/Zizur Nagusia	Navarre	3,260.6
Lasarte-Oria	Gipuzkoa	3,230.1
León	León	3,179.4
Alboraya	Valencia	3,152.6
San Fernando	Cádiz	3,125.7
Roda de Ter	Barcelona	3,115.7
San Sebastián	Gipuzkoa	3,112.3
Sant Vicenç dels Horts	Barcelona	3,099.1
Rafal	Alicante	3,091.7
Benalmádena	Málaga	2,927.8
Pineda de Mar	Barcelona	2,919.5
Almàssera	Valencia	2,912.6

== See also ==
- Demographics of Spain
- List of municipalities of Spain
- List of metropolitan areas in Spain
- Ranked lists of Spanish autonomous communities
- List of mayors of the 50 largest cities in Spain
