= Mercedes Alonso García =

Spanish politician

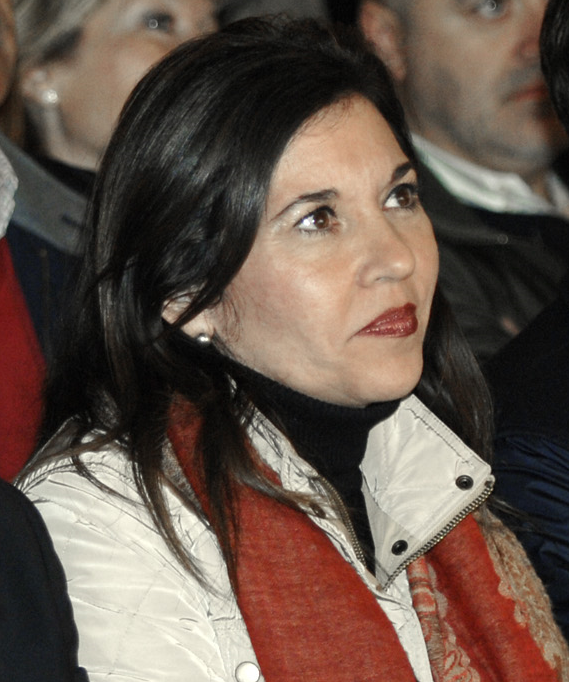
- Mercedes Alonso (2011)
- Born: Mercedes Alonso García; 10 December 1964 (age 61); Cortes de Baza, Province of Granada, Spain
- Education: University of Alicante
- Occupation: politician
- Known for: mayor of Elche (2011–2015)
- Political party: Partido Popular

Mercedes Alonso García (born 10 December 1964) is a Spanish politician of the Partido Popular. She served as mayor of Elche from 2011 through 2015.

== Biography ==
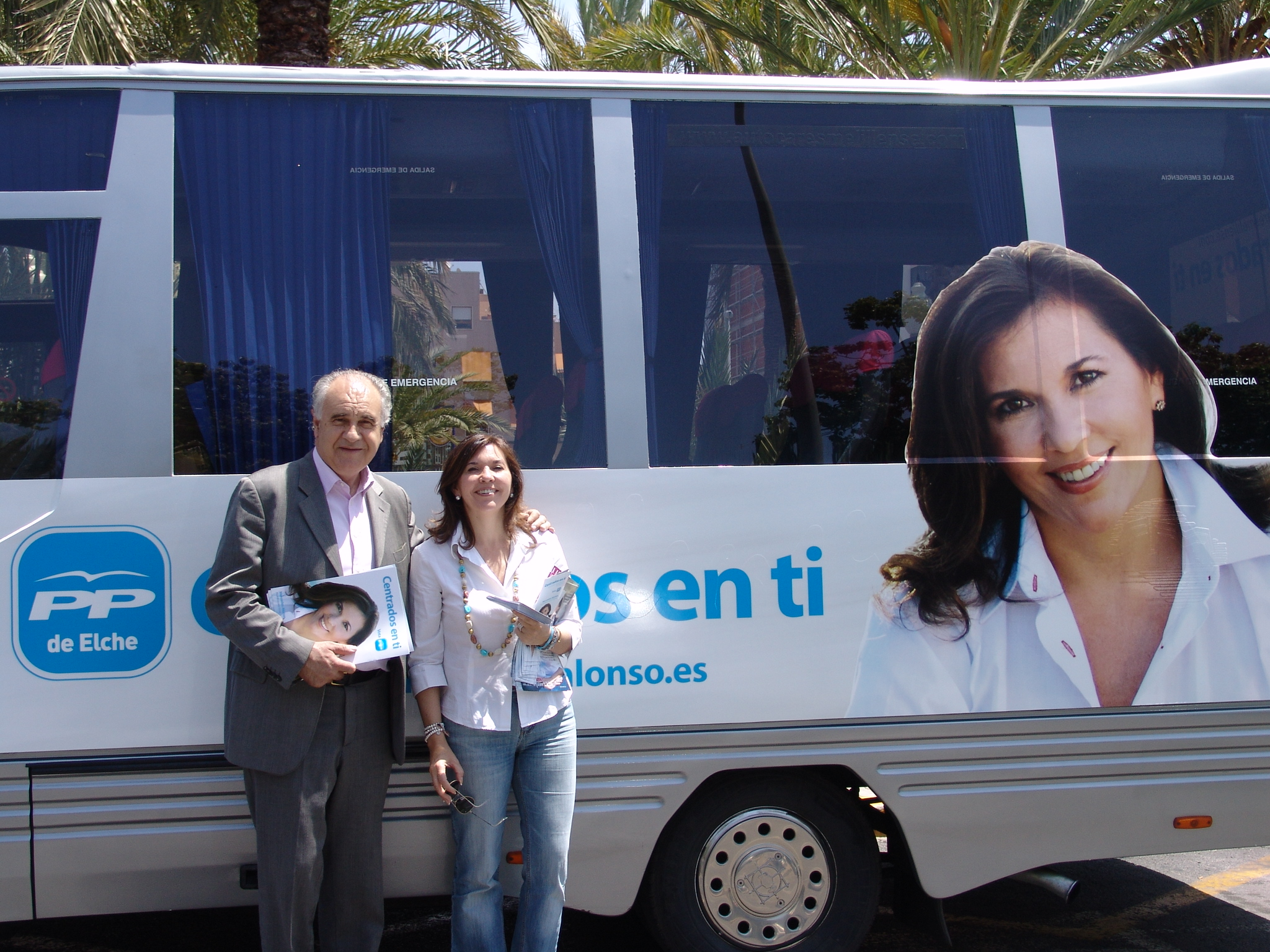
Mercedes Alonso and Rafael Blasco campaigning in Elche in 2011

Alonso was born on 10 December 1964 in Cortes de Baza, Province of Granada. She graduated with a degree in law from the University of Alicante. She has affiliated with the People's Alliance Party since 1982. Alonso has served as councilor of the municipality of Elche since 1991, as well as Provincial deputy of Alicante, responsible for Women and Youth from 1995 to 1999. She was vice-president of the Diputación Provincial de Alicante and deputy spokesperson since July 2007.

Alson served as deputy for Alicante during the VI legislature of the Corts Valencianes and by the same circumscription, in the IX legislature of the Cortes Generales. In 2011, Alonso became the first woman mayor of Elche, ending 32 years in a row of a Spanish Socialist Workers' Party government.
