= Cortes de Baza =

Cortes de Baza, Spain
- city
- Flag Coat of arms

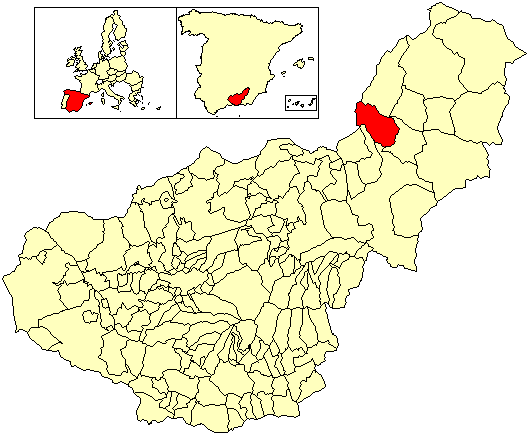
- Location of Cortes de Baza in Granada
- Coordinates: 37°38′N 2°46′W
- Country: Spain
- Province: Granada
- Municipality: Cortes de Baza

Area
  - Total: 141 km^{2} (54 sq mi)
- Elevation: 701 m (2,300 ft)

Population (2025-01-01)
  - Total: 1,769
  - Density: 12.5/km^{2} (32.5/sq mi)
- Time zone: UTC+1 (CET)
  - Summer (DST): UTC+2 (CEST)

Cortes de Baza is a municipality located in the province of Granada, Spain. According to the Instituto de Estadistica y Cartografia de Andalucia (2020) , the village has a population of 1,844 inhabitants.

== Geography ==
Cortes de Baza is located in the north of the Province of Granada along the eastern banks of the Rio Castril.

== History ==
It has been the site of human settlement since prehistoric times. It has been settled by Romans, Moors and later by the Christians after the Reconquista of Andalucia in the fifteenth century.

View of Cortes de Baza

== Buildings ==
Cortes de Baza has a sixteenth-century church built in the Mudéjar style constructed by Moorish Craftsmen.

== Economy ==
The town is very rural with farming and poplar tree plantations covering a wide area. Tourism is also becoming a main source of income. The town is very typical of this area.

== See also ==
- List of municipalities in Granada
