= Miriam Andrés =

Spanish politician (born 1976)

Member of the Senate
- In office 9 March 2008 – 12 January 2016
- Constituency: Palencia

Personal details
- Born: 13 September 1976 (age 49)
- Party: Spanish Socialist Workers' Party

Raquel Miriam Andrés Prieto (born 13 September 1976) is a Spanish politician serving as mayor of Palencia since 2023. From 2008 to 2016, she was a member of the Senate.
