= Pilar Barreiro =

Spanish politician (born 1955)

Pilar Barreiro Álvarez

Member of the Spanish Congress of Deputies
- Incumbent
- Assumed office 2008

Mayor of Cartagena
- Incumbent
- Assumed office 1995

Member of the Murcian Regional Assembly
- In office 1991–1995

Personal details
- Born: 24 November 1955 (age 70) Lugo, Spain
- Party: People's Party (PP)
- Other political affiliations: Popular Alliance (1987–1989)
- Spouse: Married
- Children: 2
- Profession: Lawyer, Politician

Pilar Barreiro Álvarez (born 24 November 1955, in Lugo, Spain) is a Spanish politician who belongs to the People's Party (PP).

Married with two children, Barreiro graduated in law. She joined the Popular Alliance in 1987 and this became the current PP in 1989. She was elected to the Murcian Regional Assembly in 1991 and served a four-year term. In 1995 she became the first female Mayor of Cartagena and has remained Mayor since then.

In 2008, she was chosen to head the PP list for the Spanish Congress of Deputies for Murcia region and the list obtained the highest vote share of all districts for any party.

In 2017, she is accused of embezzlement, corruption, and disclosure of confidential information.
