= Lara Méndez =

Spanish politician

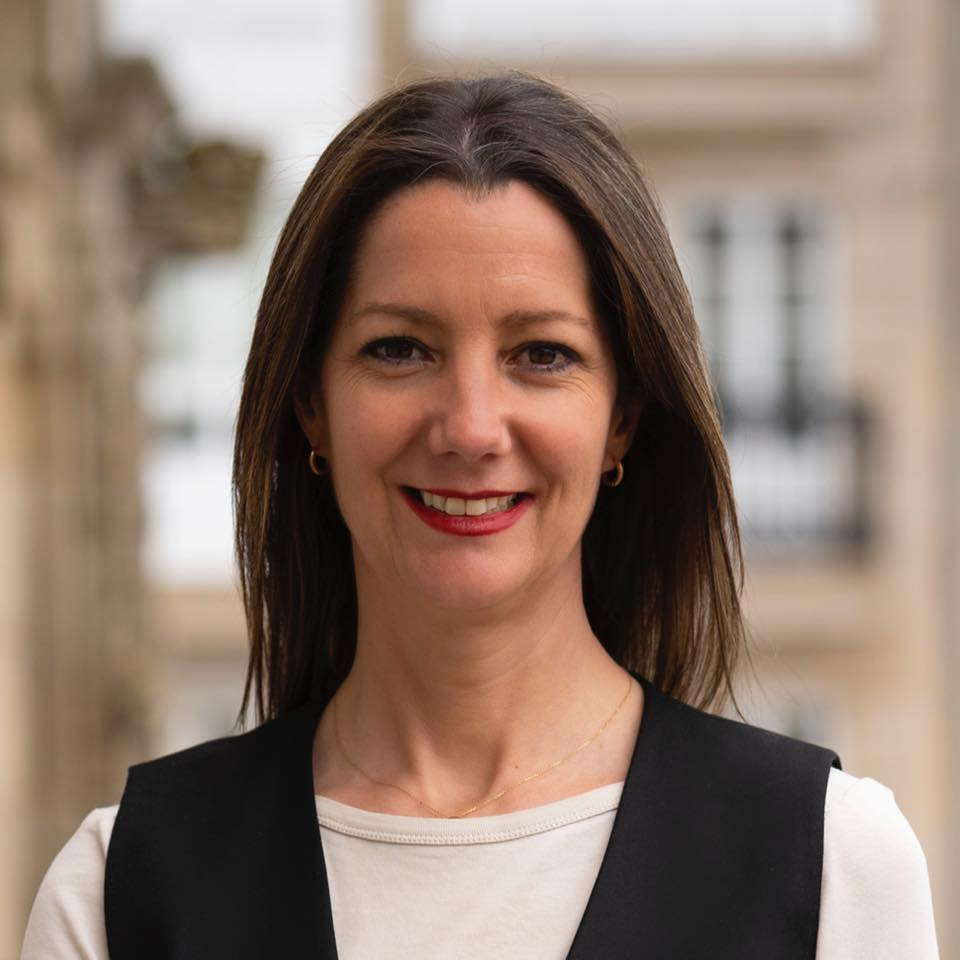

Lara Méndez López (born 1972) is a Spanish Socialist Workers' Party (PSOE) politician. She was a councillor in Cervo (2003–2015) and Lugo (2015–2024), as well as the first woman to be mayor of the latter. In 2024, she was elected to the Parliament of Galicia.

== Biography ==
=== Early life and career ===
Méndez was born in Männedorf in the Canton of Zurich, Switzerland to Galician parents and returned to their native Cervo in the Province of Lugo when she was four. She qualified as an agricultural engineer through the Lugo campus of the University of Santiago de Compostela.

In 2000, Méndez joined the youth branch of the Socialists' Party of Galicia (PSdeG), and in 2003 she was elected to the council in Cervo, leading the opposition. In 2007, she was elected to the Provincial Deputation and received attention for having a declaration of assets with no real estate or vehicles, and just over €4,000 in savings. She was wrongfully arrested in October 2009 and investigated for years over the awarding of public contracts by a department that she did not work in.

=== Mayor of Lugo (2015–2024) ===
Méndez was second on the PSOE list in Lugo for the 2015 Spanish local elections, behind mayor José López Orozco. The PSOE won eight seats, local party Lugonovo three and the Galician Nationalist Bloc (BNG) two; the other parties would not vote to install Orozco due to his indictment, resulting in the end of his 16-year mandate and making Méndez the first woman mayor of the city.

In the 2019 elections, Méndez formed a coalition government between the eight councillors from her party and the five of the BNG. The results four years later extended this agreement, as the parties maintained the same number of seats compared to 12 from the People's Party (PP).

=== Parliament of Galicia (2024–) ===
In December 2021, Valentín González Formoso was named secretary-general of the PSdeG, with Méndez as vice secretary. In March 2025, following the 15th Congress of the PSdeG, she was named Secretary of Organisation under José Ramón Gómez Besteiro.

Méndez resigned as mayor of Lugo in January 2024 due to running as number 2 on the PSOE list for the Lugo constituency in the 2024 Galician regional election, but kept her seat on the council. Having been elected to the Parliament of Galicia, she resigned her municipal seat.
