= Ignacio Gragera =

Spanish politician

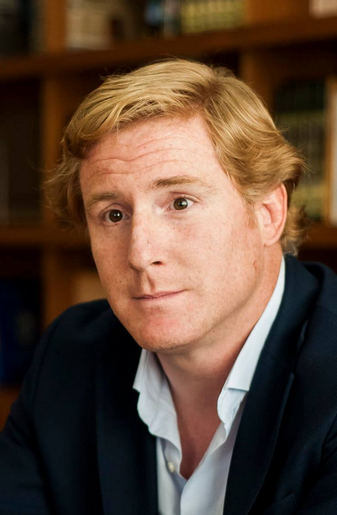

Mayor of Badajoz
- Incumbent
- Assumed office 26 June 2021
- Preceded by: Francisco Javier Fragoso Martínez

Member of the Badajoz City Council
- Incumbent
- Assumed office 15 June 2019

Personal details
- Born: 6 September 1982 (age 44) Badajoz, Extremadura, Spain
- Party: People's Party (2022–present)
- Other political affiliations: Citizens (until 2022)
- Education: University of Salamanca
- Profession: Lawyer

Ignacio Gragera Barrera (born 6 September 1982) is a Spanish politician. He was elected to the city council of Badajoz in Extremadura in 2019 and became mayor in 2021. Initially a member of the Citizens party (Cs), he defected to the People's Party (PP) in 2022.

== Biography ==
Born in Badajoz, Extremadura, Gragera graduated in law from the University of Salamanca. He began his legal career in 2007, and started his own law firm in 2016. In April 2019, he was chosen as Citizens' (Cs) candidate for the upcoming local elections in Badajoz.

In the elections, Cs rose from two to four seats to become the third largest grouping in the council after the Spanish Socialist Workers' Party (PSOE) and People's Party (PP), and Gragera said that he would work with any other party. He reached a deal with the PP of incumbent mayor Javier Fragoso to form a coalition, with Gragera as his deputy and succeeding him halfway through the four-year term.

Gragera was named in Citizens' national executive in March 2021, by leader Inés Arrimadas. He was invested as mayor in June, with 14 votes from the Cs and PP councillors and the one independent member formerly of Vox, versus 13 against from the PSOE and Unidas Podemos. The former Vox member, Alejandro Vélez, was named in Gragera's cabinet as part of the agreement.

In December 2022, the PP's national leader Alberto Núñez Feijóo confirmed that the party was looking to enlist Gragera for the next year's local elections in Badajoz. He was publicly presented as a member of the party by María Guardiola, its candidate for the 2023 Extremaduran regional election.

== Personal life ==
Gragera played rugby union, mainly across the border in Portugal due to the shorter travels compared to the Spanish leagues. He played for S.L. Benfica's rugby team, and was one of four players to transfer from Club de Rugby Badajoz to Rugby Clube de Montemor in 2015. A year later, after achieving promotion, he made his debut in the Campeonato Nacional de Rugby, the top tier of the sport in Portugal.
