= Judith Piquet =

Spanish politician (born 1979)

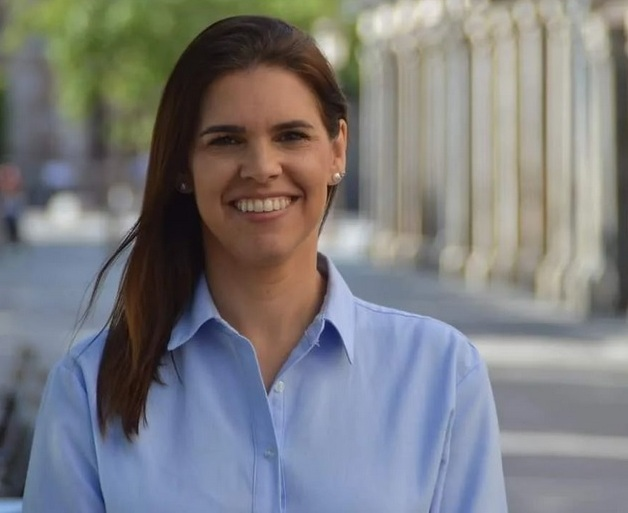
- Piquet in 2021

Mayor of Alcalá de Henares
- Incumbent
- Assumed office 17 June 2023
- Preceded by: Javier Rodríguez Palacios

Personal details
- Born: 10 April 1979 (age 47)
- Party: People's Party

Judith Piquet Flores (born 10 April 1979) is a Spanish politician serving as mayor of Alcalá de Henares since 2023. From 2021 to 2023, she was a member of the Assembly of Madrid.
