= Marta Farrés =

Spanish politician

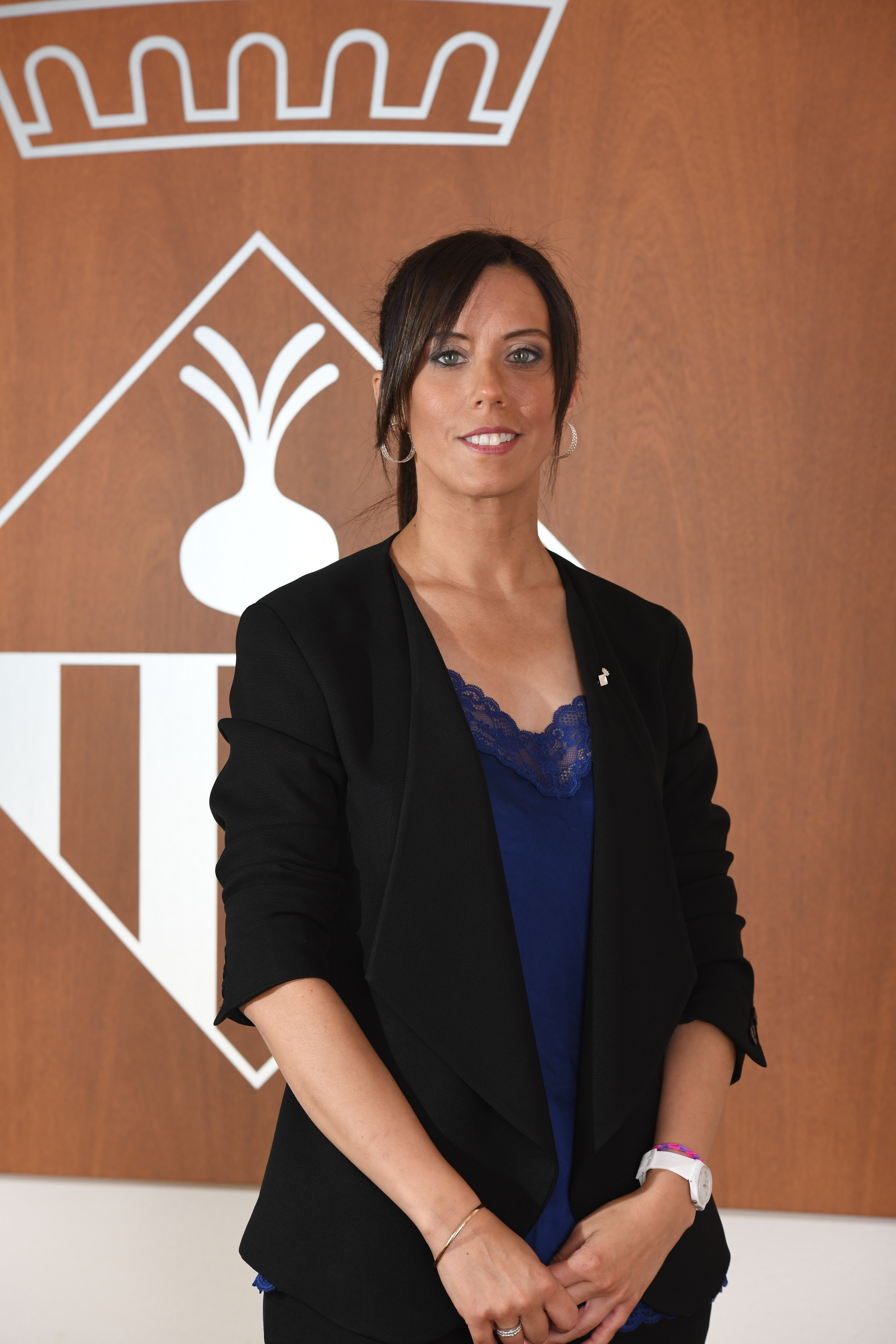
Marta Farrés, Mayor of Sabadell

Marta Farrés Falgueras (Sabadell, September 30, 1981) is a Spanish politician affiliated with the PSC since 2003, and currently mayor of Sabadell, since June 2019.

== Life ==
She has a degree in Political Science and Administration from the Autonomous University of Barcelona, and a diploma in Institutional Relations and Protocol and a master's degree in Mediation.

She has been local councilor and deputy mayor of Sabadell City Council between 2003 and 2015, with mayors Manuel Bustos and Joan Carles Sánchez.

In 2015 she lost the primaries to lead her party's list for the local elections. In the 2019 Spanish local elections, she topped the list with the most votes. In the Spanish local elections of 2023, she ran again as a candidate for mayor, obtaining an absolute majority.
