= Gema Igual =

Spanish politician

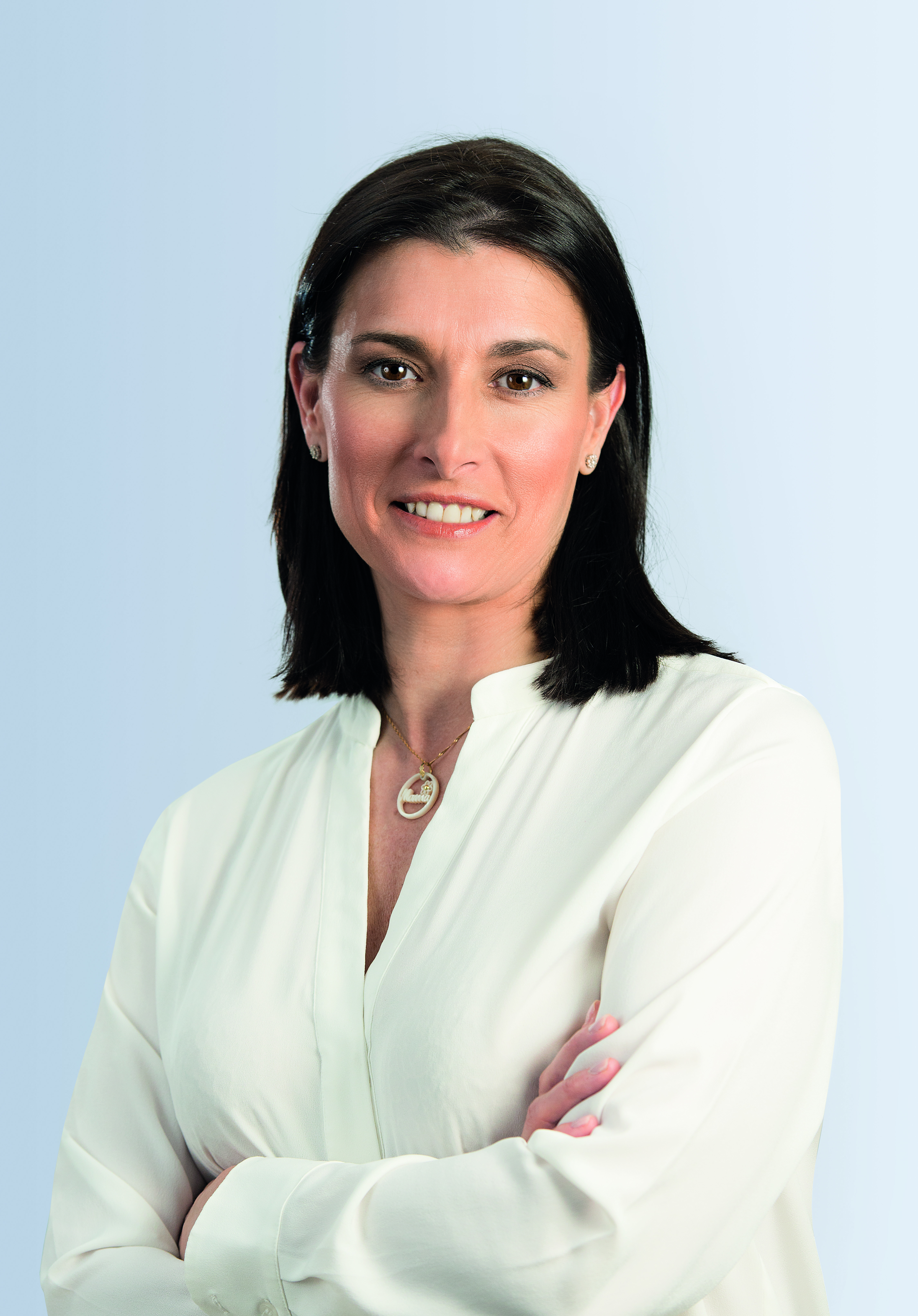

Gema Igual Ortiz (born 10 September 1973) is a Spanish politician of the People's Party (PP). She was elected to the city council of Santander in Cantabria in 2003 and became mayor in 2016. She was elected to the Parliament of Cantabria in 2023.

== Biography ==
Igual was born in Santander in Cantabria. She was raised in nearby Isla, in the municipality of Arnuero. Her older brother José Manuel is also a People's Party politician, mayor of Arnuero since 1999 and member of the Parliament of Cantabria from 2003 to 2019. She studied teaching at the University of Cantabria but did not finish her course.

After leaving university, Igual relocated to Madrid, where she worked for eight years at a travel agency and then returned to Cantabria to lead its Association of Young Businesspeople. In 2003, she was elected to the city council on a list led by mayor Gonzalo Piñeiro, and was put in charge of tourism and festivities by his administration.

In November 2016, mayor Íñigo de la Serna left office to be Minister of Growth in the national government, and Igual was sworn in as the first woman to be mayor of Santander. In the 2019 Spanish local elections, her party fell to 10 out of 27 seats and governed as a minority with the two councillors from Citizens. Four years later, her party achieved an absolute majority with 14 seats.

Igual was elected to the Parliament of Cantabria in the 2023 Cantabrian regional election, running second on the PP list. In September 2023, she became vice president of the Spanish Federation of Municipalities and Provinces (FEMP).
