= University of Burgos =

Public university in Burgos, Spain

Coordinates: 42.3411°N 3.7283°W

- Universidad de Burgos
- Other name: UBU
- Motto: In Itinere Veritas
- Type: Public
- Established: May 26th, 1994
- Rector: Manuel Pérez Mateos
- Academic staff: 700
- Administrative staff: 300
- Students: 10,000
- Location: Burgos, Castilla y Leon, Spain
- Website: www.ubu.es
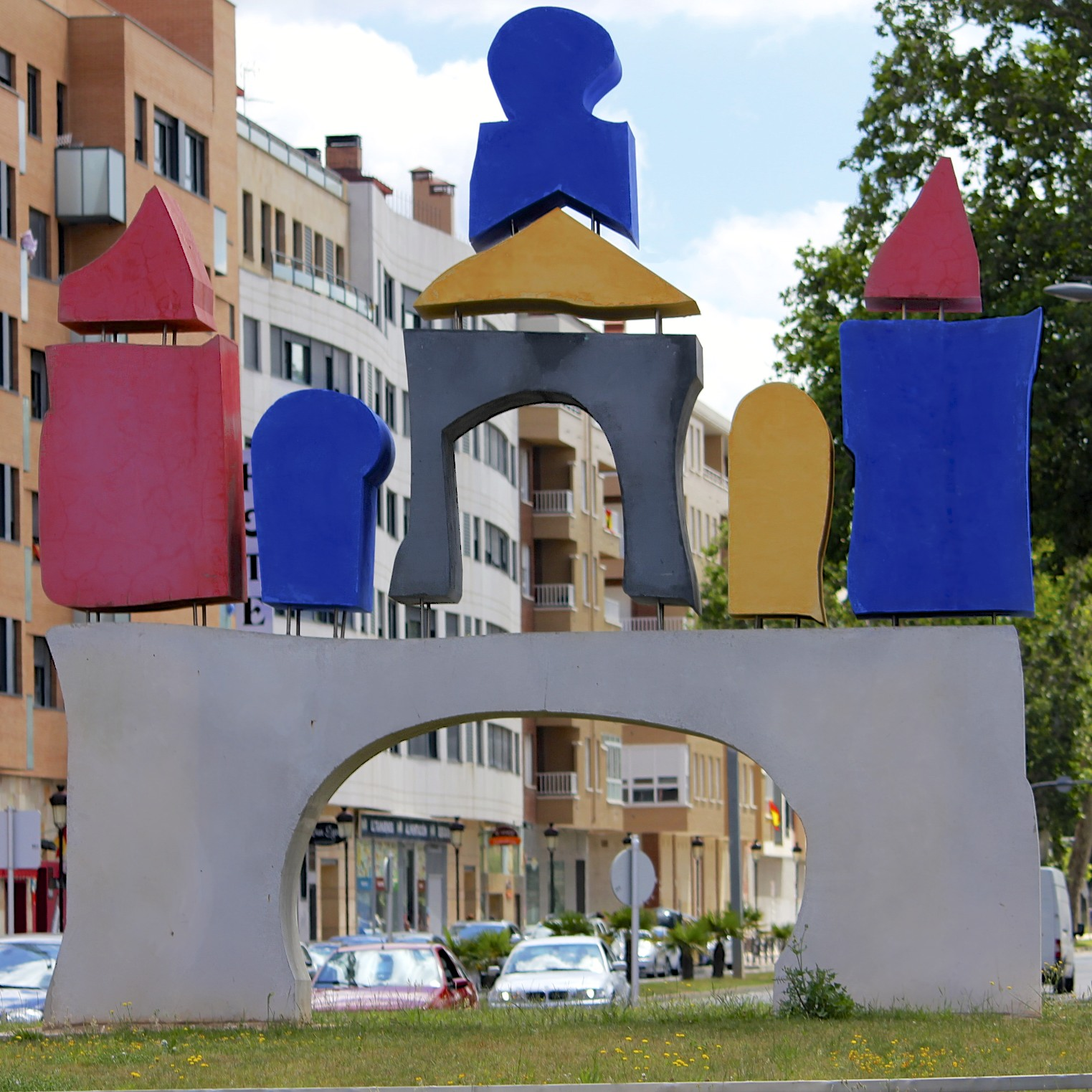

The University of Burgos (in Spanish: Universidad de Burgos and often abbreviated UBU) is a public university in the Spanish city of Burgos with about 10,000 students studying over 30 different undergraduate degrees, over 20 PhD Programmes, as well as several Official Masters and other graduate courses.

== History ==
The University of Burgos was founded in 1994 when it was segregated from the University of Valladolid. Since then it has grown and developed new academic fields placing it in a prominent position among Spanish Universities. From 1994 to 1997 it was governed by a management committee, chaired by Professor of Valladolid Dr. Marcos Sacristán Represa. Its first president was Professor Dr. José María Leal Villalba, from 1997 to 2008. His successor was Dr. Alfonso Murillo Villar.

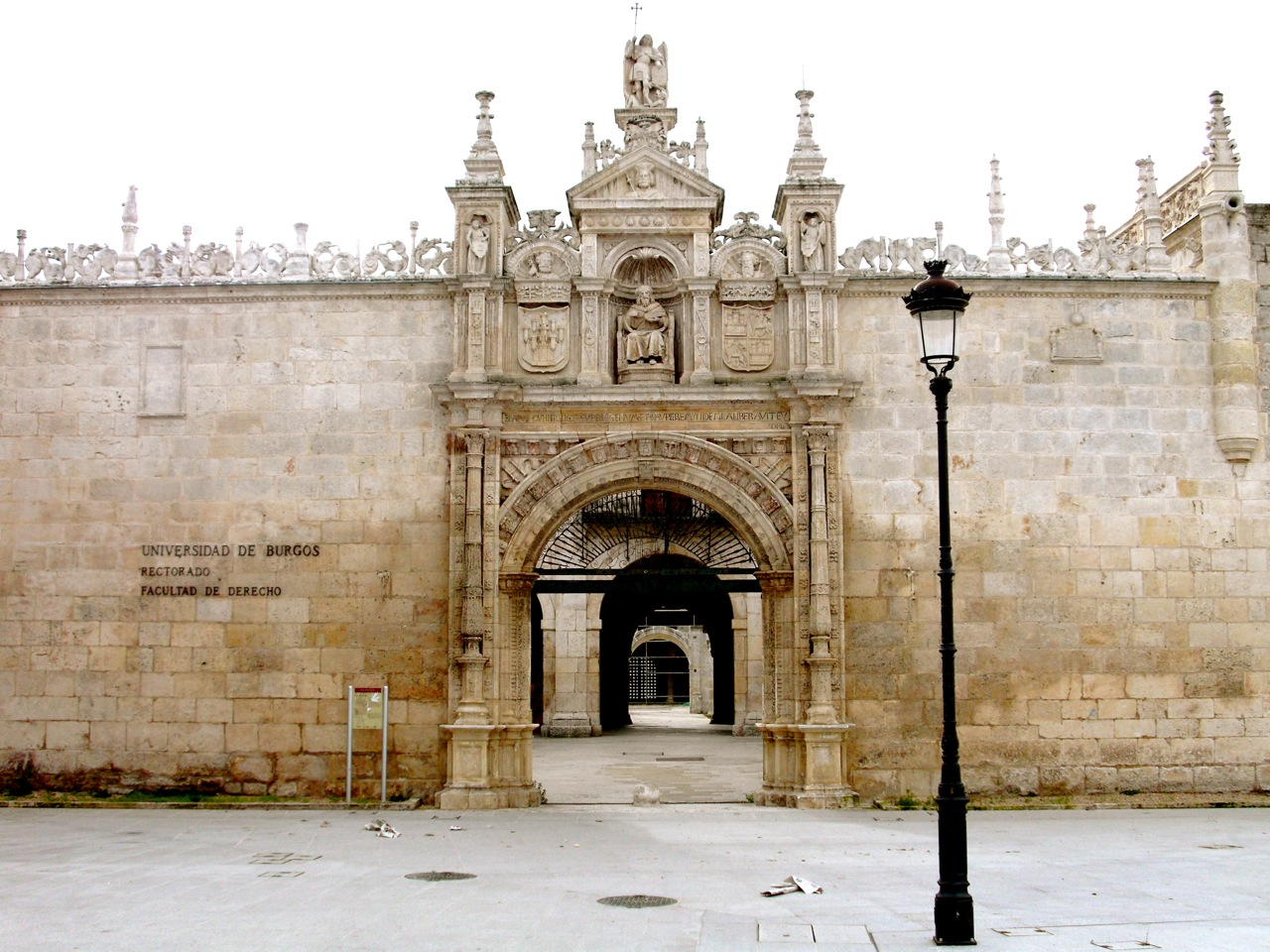
"Romeros Gate"(1562): A symbol of the university, entrance to the "Hospital del Rey", the School of Law, and the office of the rector

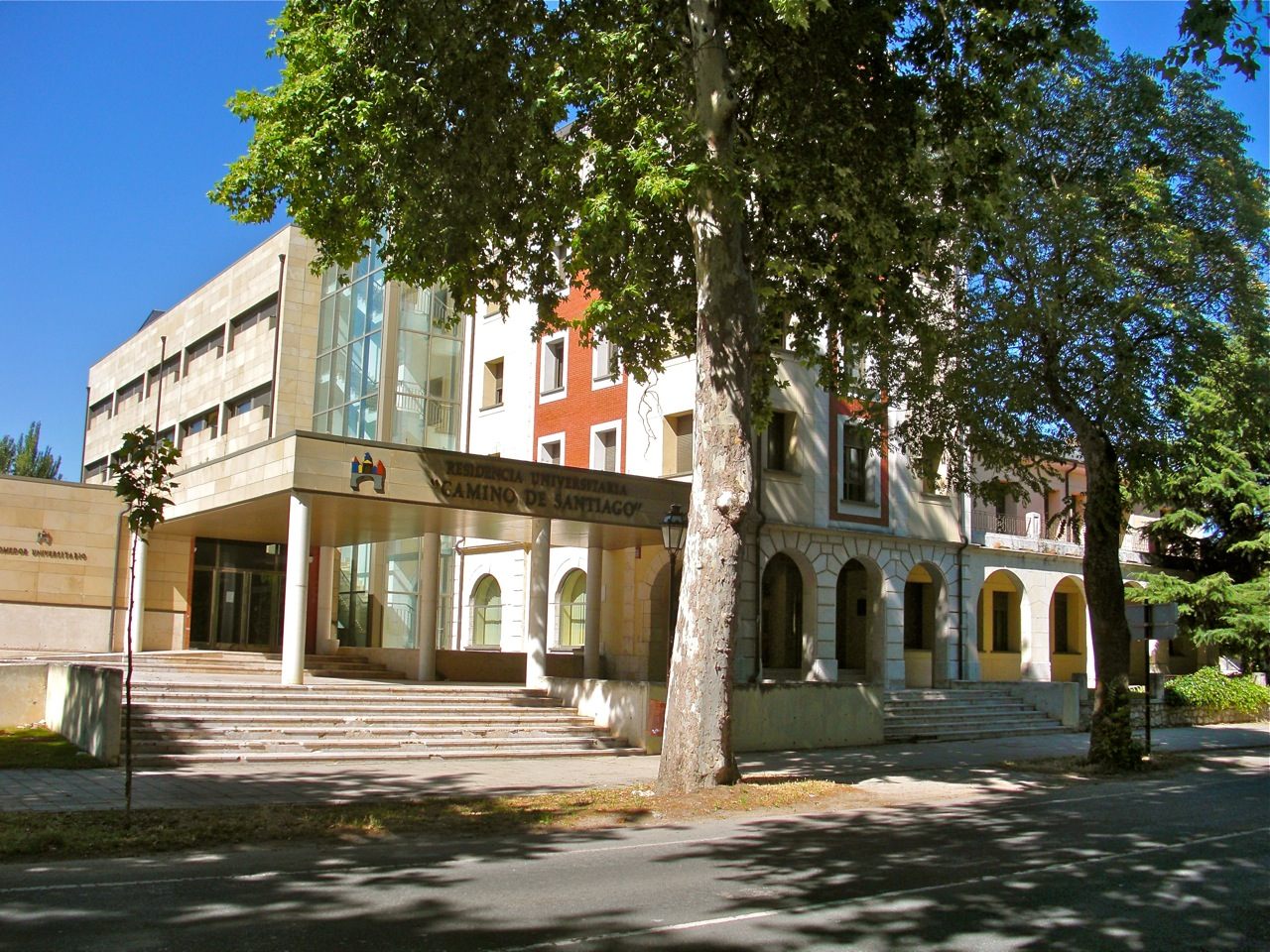
Main Residence Hall "Camino de Santiago"

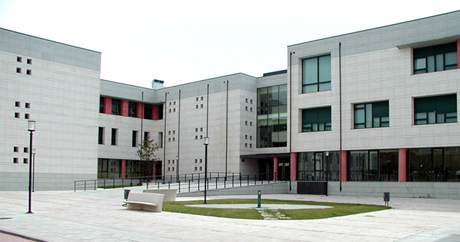
School of Economy and Business

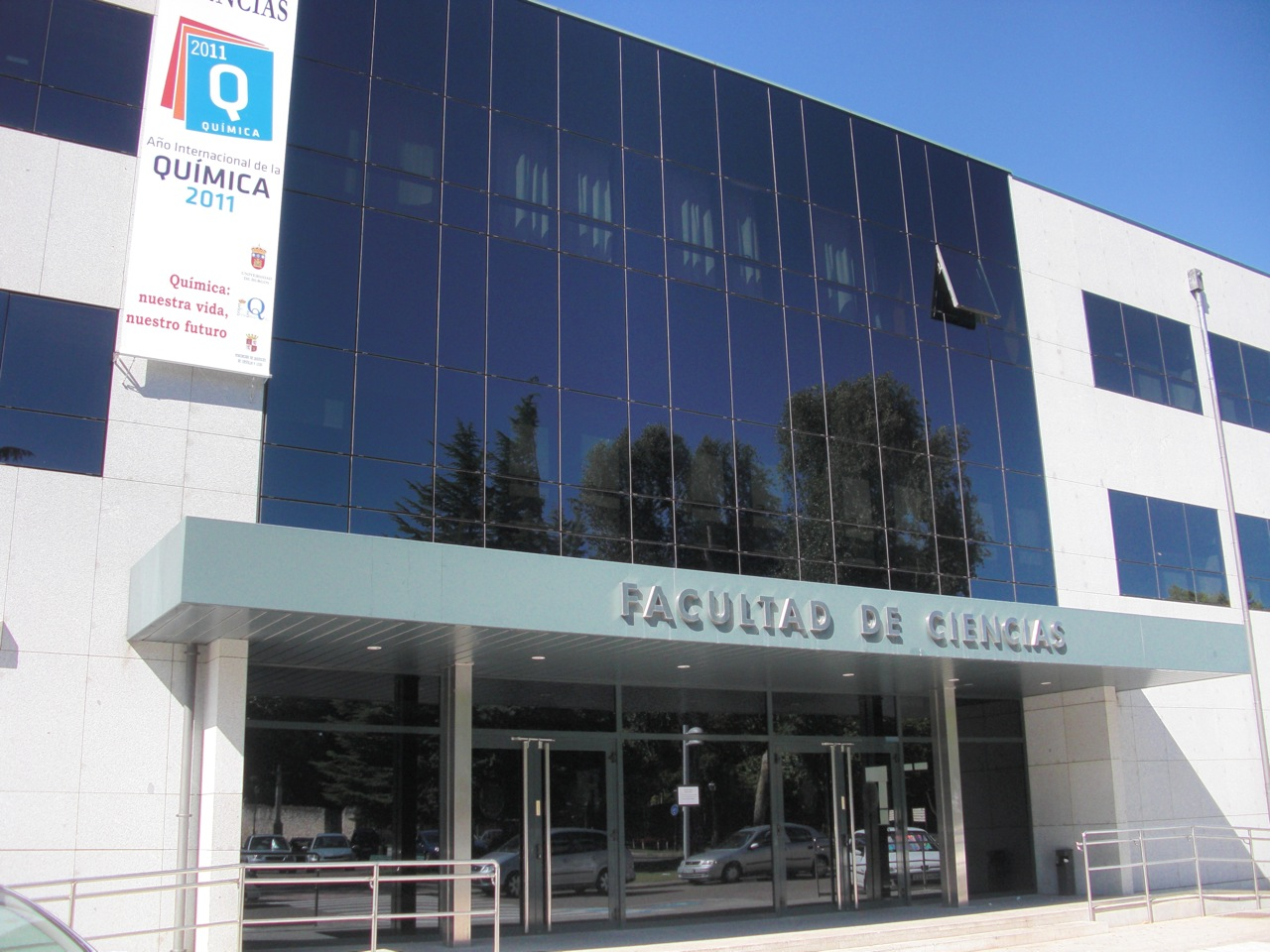
School of Sciences

== Campus ==
The University of Burgos currently has nearly 10,000 students on three campuses:

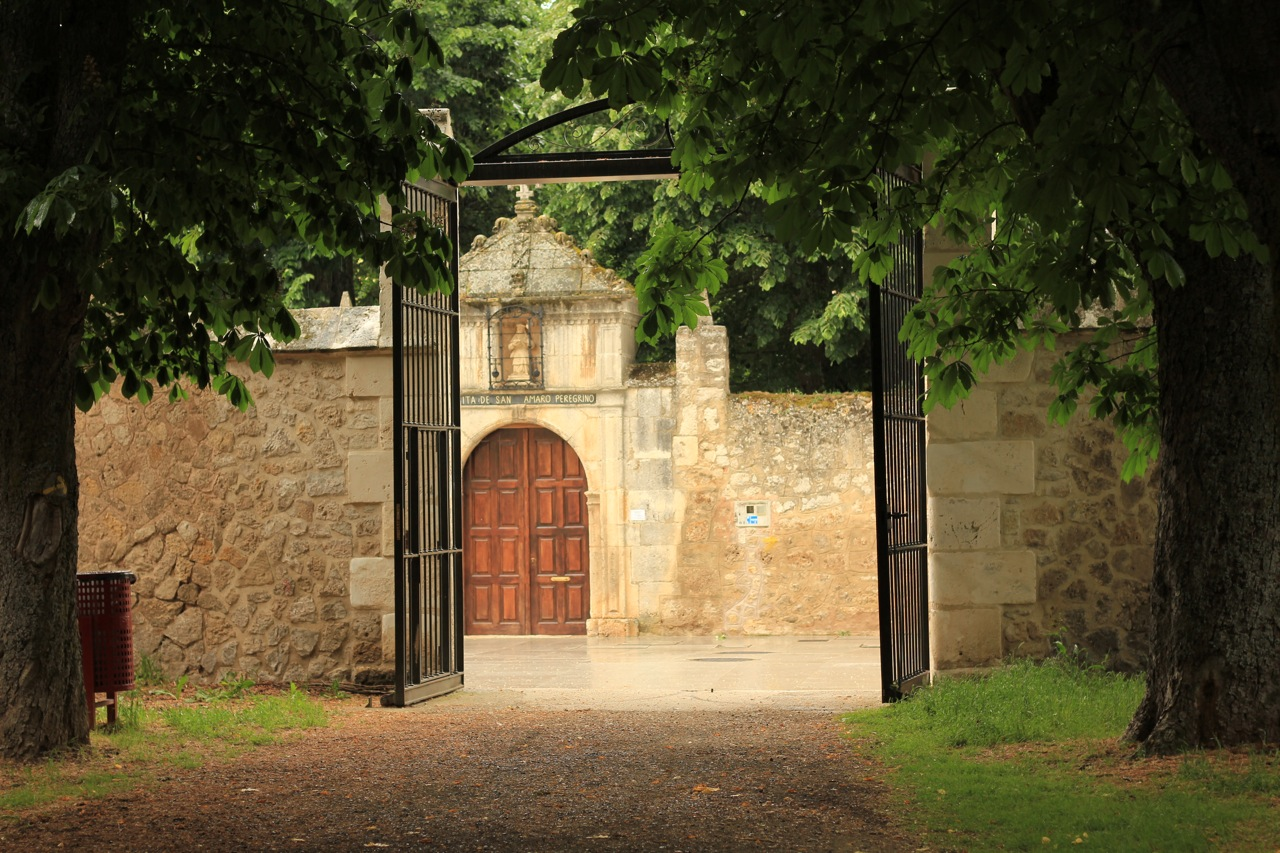
Hospital del Rey - Campus San Amaro

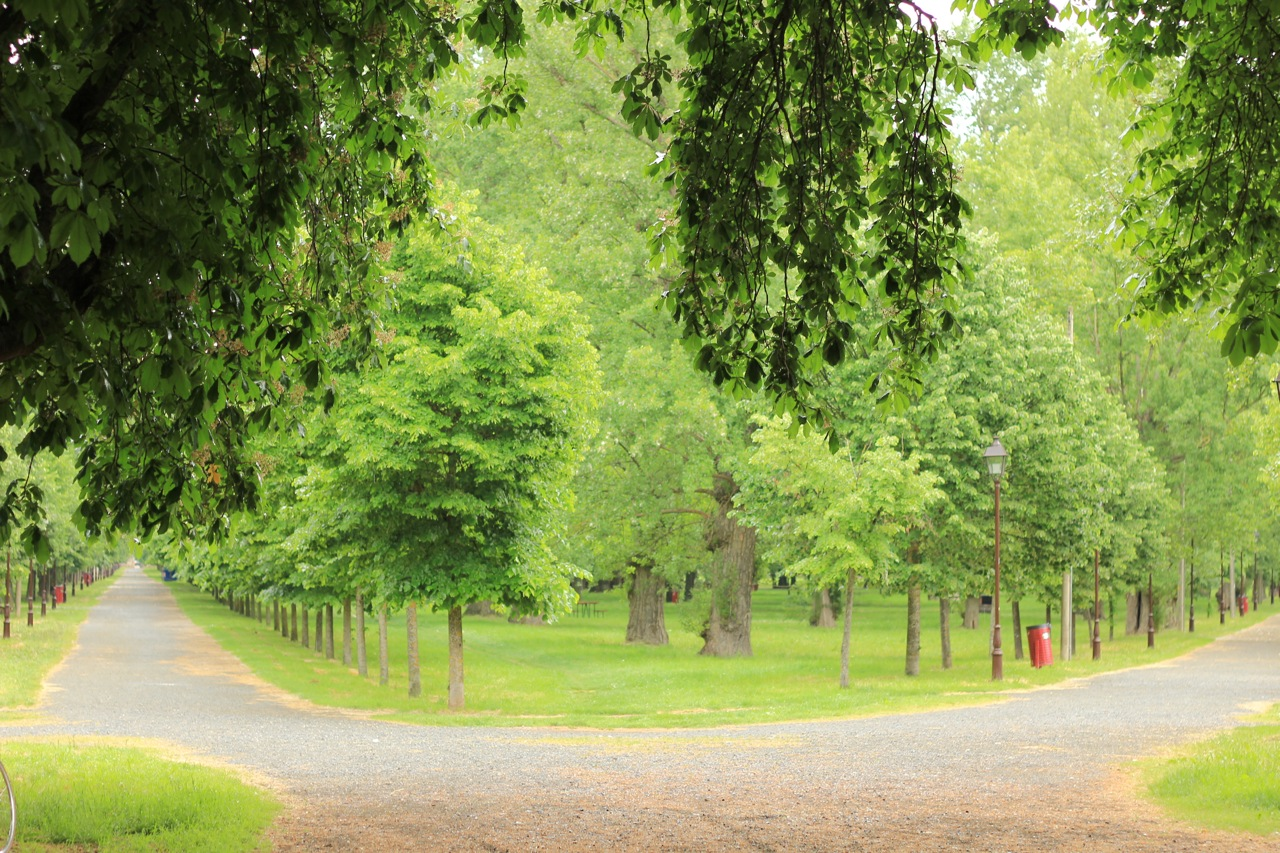
Hospital del Rey - El Parral Park

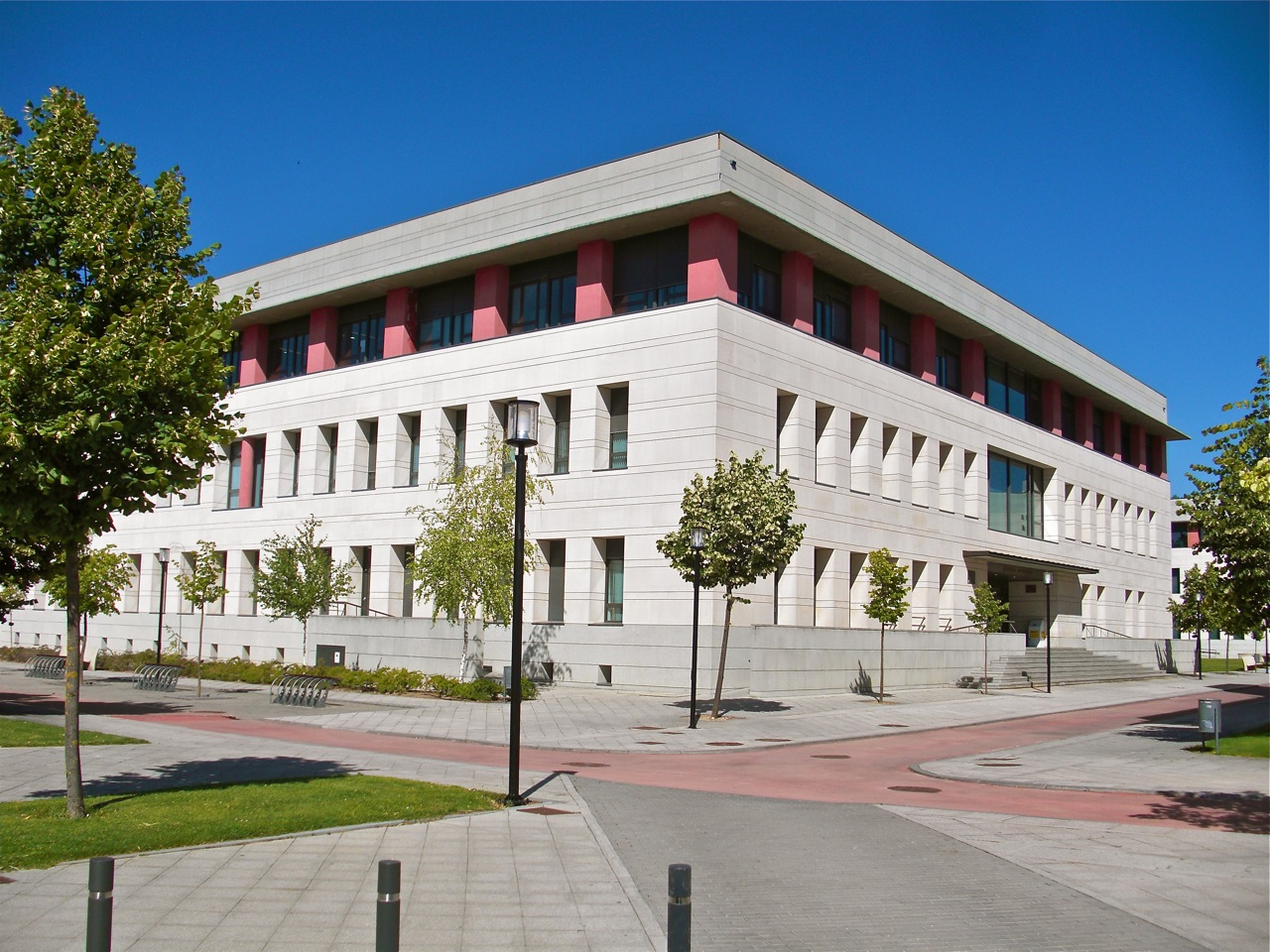
Main Library

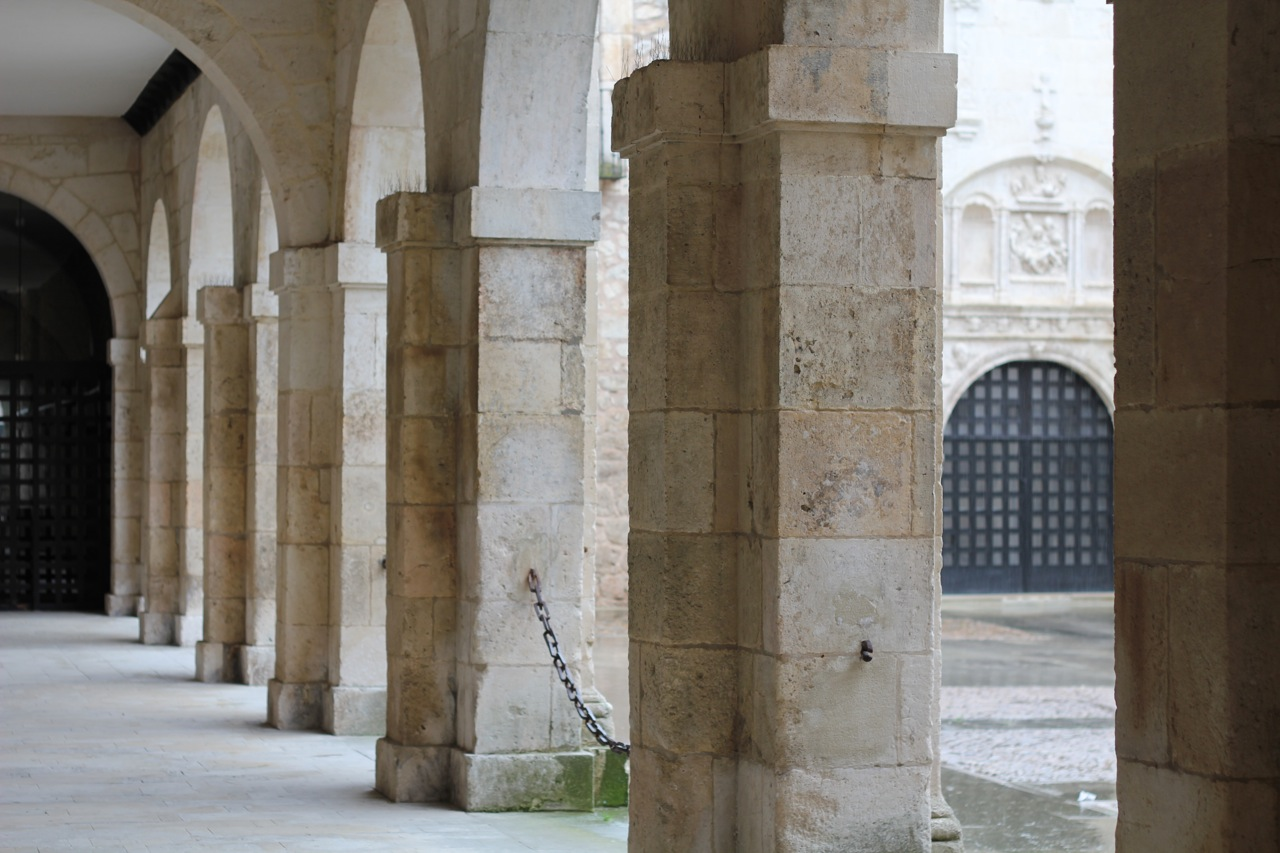
Hospital del Rey

- San Amaro / Hospital del Rey: Located west of the city of Burgos exiting on the old road towards Portugal (N-620th) and León (N-120). Here are the rector, the central services, library, sports hall, residence and dining hall, the Faculties of Economics and Business, Law, Humanities and Education and the Polytechnic School.
- Río Vena / Vigón: Located north of the city in the direction of Cantabria N-623. This campus was the original seat of the Polytechnic School (dependent to the University of Valladolid) and the beginning of the current Polytechnic School of Burgos. Here you will also find the School of Business Studies and the School of Education.
- Miranda de Ebro: Located in the city of Miranda de Ebro at the northeast of the province of Burgos. It was founded the last and offers engineering careers.

=== Other facilities ===
- Hospital de la Concepción: Located in the south of the city center, just a few meters from the Burgos Cathedral, its construction dates back to the sixteenth century, though its façade is the seventeenth century. It served as an inn for pilgrims since its inception. In the year 1799 it became home to the Faculty of Medicine, which disappeared by the year 1817. In 2012 rehabilitation work was completed after an investment of more than 7 million euros. The building is now used by the University of Burgos.
- Residential and educational complex "Miguel Delibes" located in Sedano in the Valley of Sedano (50 km/31 mi north of Burgos). Situated on 7.4 acres (3 hectares) it is used for the development of courses, meetings, seminars and camps. The site belongs to the University of Burgos, although it is open to the public.

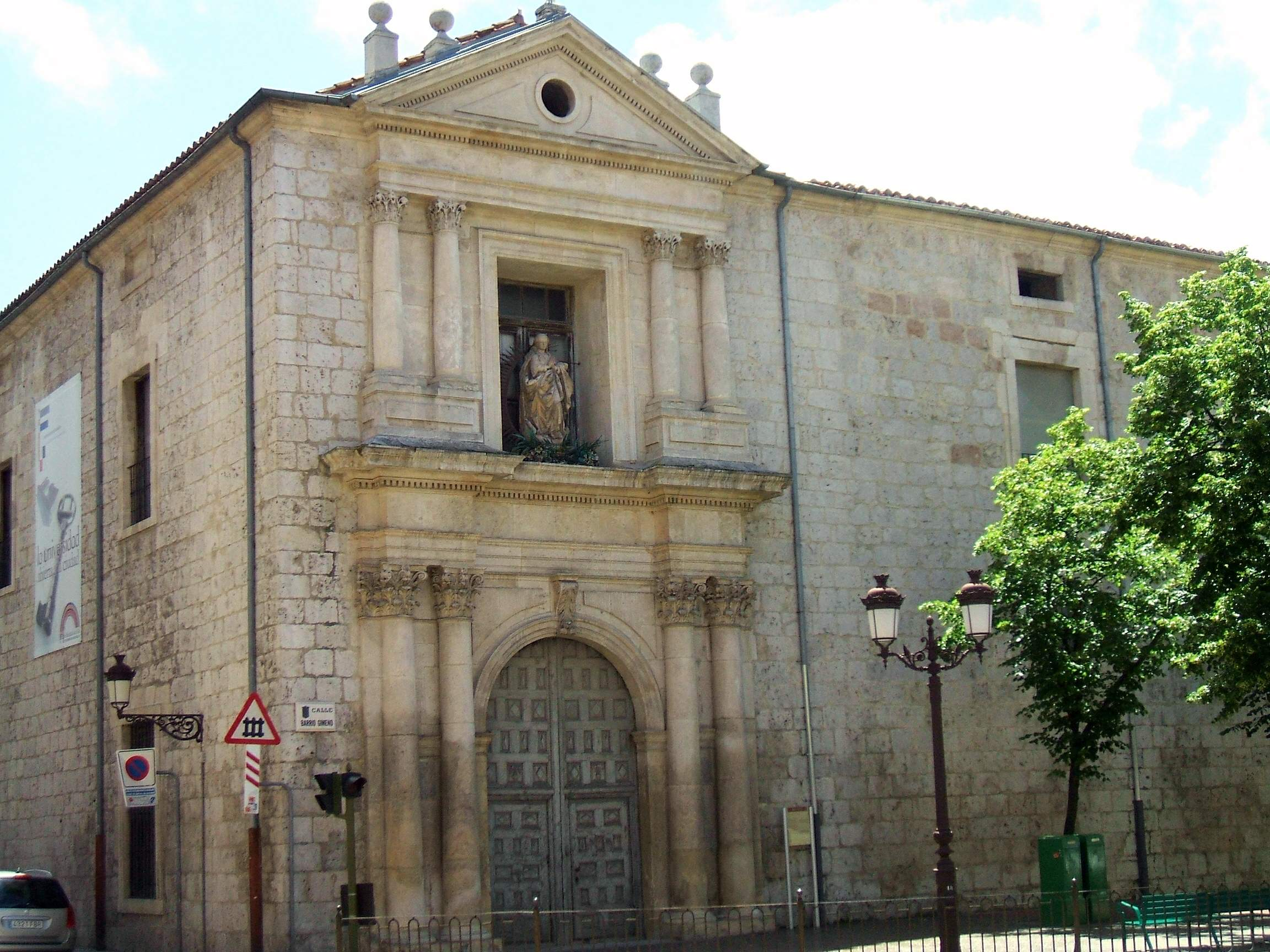
Hospital de la Concepcion

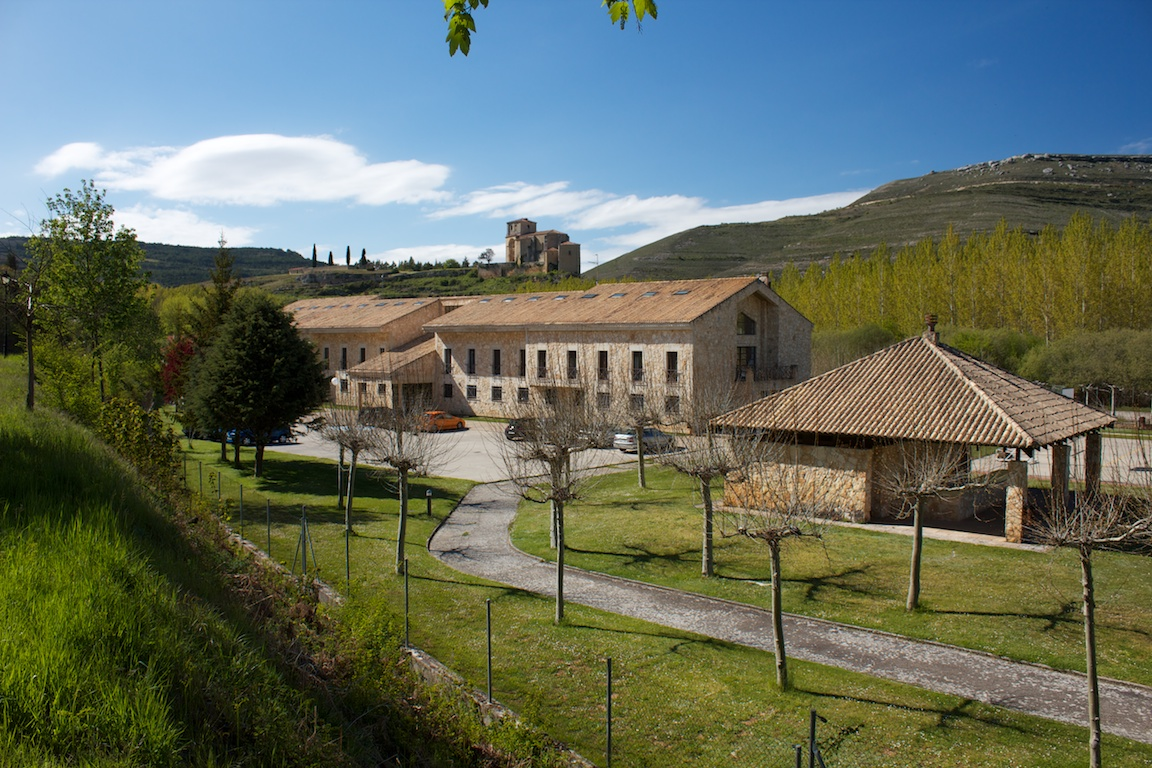
Complex "Miguel Delibes" in Sedano, 50km north of Burgos

== Academic Centres ==
The University of Burgos conducts its functions in eight different centres, five of their own as well as three associated schools:

UBU Centres	Associated Schools
School of Sciences; School of Economy and Business; School of Law; School of Humanities and Education; Polytechnic School	School of Nursing; School of Labour Relations; School of Tourism

The university also has a research and development centre, as well as three institutes:

- Centre of "Research, Development and Innovation"(I+D+i) located in the Science and Technology Park
- Institute of Public Administration
- Institute of Restoration
- Institute for Training and Educational Innovation

== Hospital del Rey ==
The "Hospital del Rey" now central to the university's campus, is located along the Way of Saint James (Camino de Santiago) passing through west Burgos. It was founded by Alfonso VIII in 1195. Together with the Monastery of Santa María la Real de Las Huelgas it was a great shelter for pilgrims. Upon entry is the shrine of French saint San Amaro and the cemetery where they buried the pilgrims who died in the hospital.

The Hospital del Rey was built during the Renaissance, and retains some remnants of the early medieval hospital (such as the pillars of the old church). The entrance is through the Romeros Gate - now a symbol of the university. It is an arch decorated on both sides, with Jacobean-era references, as well as portraits of the founders (Alfonso VIII and Queen Eleanor).

Access to the Patio de los Romeros, is occupied by the hospital's church which displays a Baroque-style interior. The atrium of the church opens to a section of the school used for ceremonial events. Here you will find the House of Sacristans - the Dean of the School of Law, access to the cafeteria, and the Rectorate building. Here in the beautiful garden setting is the "chessboard" where in summer there are musical activities to coincide with the summer courses at the university.

Various restorations to the remains of the facility earned it the "Europa Nostra" award.

== Library ==
The university has 5 libraries throughout the campus, one located in each of the 5 academic centres: School of Sciences, School of Law, School of Humanities and Education, the Polytechnic School and the School of Economy and Business where the university's main library is located. The libraries provide information resources for learning, teaching, research and training. It also participates in activities related to the management and operation of the university.

The university has also prepared an online electronic database available 24 hours a day where students and faculty can find books, magazines and download full articles. Services provided by the library include UBUCAT and WorldCat. UBUCAT is a computerized catalogue of the University Library. It allows access to records located in all 5 University of Burgos libraries: books, both print and electronic journals, audiovisual materials, electronic resources, databases, standards, theses and projects read at the University of Burgos, etc. WorldCat provides research access to libraries around the world.

Access to other catalogues include REBIUN (access to various Spanish university libraries), Libraries of the CSIC, National Library of Spain, The European Library, Worldwide Spanish Libraries, Libraries in Castile and León, and Public Libraries of Burgos. The university's libraries also provide special work stations and research rooms for group work or individual research.

The library contains important old manuscripts.

== Degrees and Majors ==
=== Arts and Humanities ===
- Degree in Spanish: Language and Literature
- Degree in History and Heritage
- Master's Degree in Medieval History of Castile and León (Inter-university)
- Master's Degree in Human Evolution (Inter-university)

=== Social Science and Law ===
- Double Degree in Law and Business Administration
- Degree in Business Administration and Management
- Degree in Political Science and Public Management
- Degree in Audiovisual Communication
- Degree in Law
- Degree in Social Education
- Degree in Finance and Accounting
- Degree in Early Childhood Education
- Degree in Elementary Education
- Degree in Pedagogy
- Degree in Labour Relations and Human Resources
- Degree in Tourism
- Master's Degree in Business Economics (Inter-university)
- Master's Degree in Secondary Education and Baccalaureate, Vocational Training and Language Teaching
- Master's Degree in Education and Inclusive Society

=== Sciences ===
- Degree in Chemistry
- Master's Degree in Advanced Chemistry
- Master's Degree in Tourism Management and Operation of Wine Culture: Wine Tourism in Cuenca del Duero

=== Engineering and Architecture ===
- Degree in Agricultural Engineering and Rural
- Degree in Engineering Building
- Degree in Engineering in Civil Construction Works
- Degree in Engineering Public Works Transport and Urban Services
- Degree in Industrial Engineering
- Degree in Engineering Technology Pathways
- Degree in Industrial Electronics and Automation
- Computer Engineering
- Degree in Mechanical Engineering
- Master's Degree in Industrial Engineering
- Master's Degree in Computer Engineering
- Master's Degree in Fluid Engineering Thermodynamics (Inter-university)
- Master's Degree in Thermal Engineering (Inter-university)

=== Health Science ===
- Degree in Science and Food Technology
- Nursing Degree
- Degree in Occupational Therapy
- Master's Degree in Food Security and Biotechnology

=== Doctorate programs ===
- Advances in Food Science and Biotechnology
- Business Economics
- Education: Historical Perspectives, Policies, and Management Curriculum
- Electrochemistry: Science and Technology
- Physics and Computational Mathematics
- Globalization, New Technologies and Integrated Markets
- Thermal Engineering
- Engineering Research
- Engineering Research in Thermodynamics Fluid
- Lasers and Advanced Spectroscopy in Chemistry
- Heritage and Communication
- Advanced Chemistry

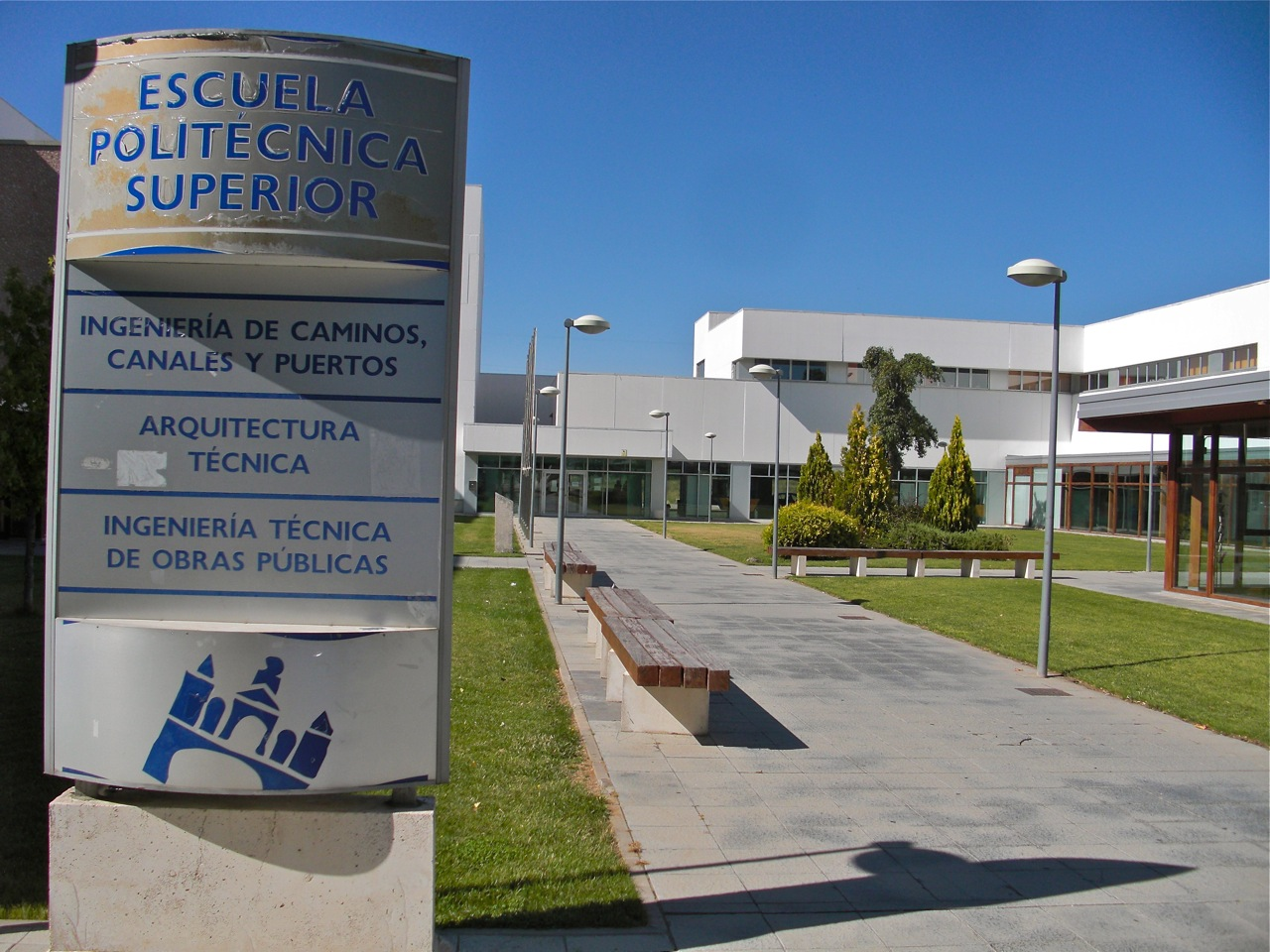
Polytechnic School

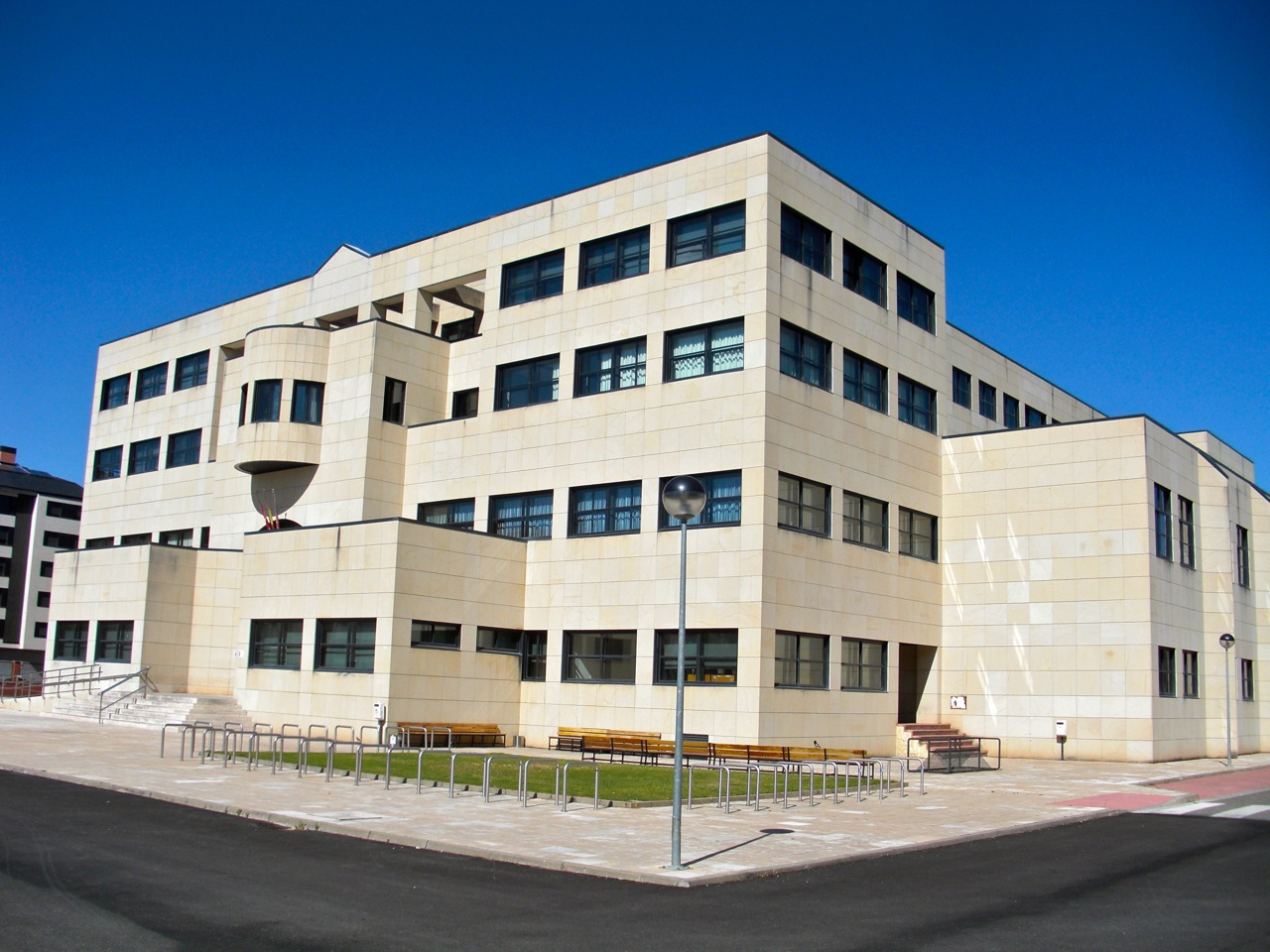
School of Humanities and Education

=== Degrees, Diplomas, Engineering, Technical Engineering and Technical Architecture ===
Polytechnic School	Faculty of Humanities and Education
Technical Architect; Engineer of Paths, Channels and Ports; Engineering in Industrial Organization; Computer Engineering (2nd Cycle); Agricultural Technical Engineering: Horticulture and Food; Technical Engineer of Public Works Civil Construction; Technical Engineer of Public Works, Transport and Urban Services; Technical Engineer in Computer Science; Technical Engineer: Industrial Electronics; Industrial Technical Engineering: Mechanics	Diploma in Occupational Therapy.; Diploma in Social Education; Degree in Audiovisual Communication; Bachelor of Pedagogy (2nd cycle); Bachelor of Humanities; Special Education Specialist Teacher; Early Childhood Education Teacher; Specialist Teacher of Music Education; Primary Teacher Education Specialist; Foreign Language Specialist Teacher
School of Sciences	School of Law
Bachelor of Science and Food Technology (2nd cycle); Degree in Chemistry	Degree in Labour (2nd cycle); Bachelor in Political Science and Administration (2nd cycle); Law Degree (Plan 2003) (Plan 1953); Joint Program in Law and Business Administration
Faculty of Economics and Business	Degree in Labour (2nd cycle); Bachelor in Political Science and Administration (2nd cycle); Law Degree (Plan 2003) (Plan 1953); Joint Program in Law and Business Administration
Diploma in Business; Diploma in Public Administration and Management; Bachelor of Business Administration; Joint Program in Law and Business Administration	Degree in Labour (2nd cycle); Bachelor in Political Science and Administration (2nd cycle); Law Degree (Plan 2003) (Plan 1953); Joint Program in Law and Business Administration
Diploma in Business; Diploma in Public Administration and Management; Bachelor of Business Administration; Joint Program in Law and Business Administration	School of Nursing
Diploma in Business; Diploma in Public Administration and Management; Bachelor of Business Administration; Joint Program in Law and Business Administration	Diploma in Nursing
School of Labour Relations	School of Tourism
Diploma Labour Relations	Diploma in Tourism

== Culture and Sport ==
=== Theatre ===
In 1997, theatre activities were born at the University of Burgos, in an effort to complete the cultural education of the university community and the general public.

The "Aula de Teatro" of the University of Burgos works together with other local institutions throughout the year to organize different and varied cultural events (University Theatre Festival, Open Stage International Festival[Festival Internacional Escena Abierta], concerts, street performances, etc.)

Plays put on include:

- "King John" by William Shakespeare (1997)
- "The King with the Golden Mask" by Marcel Schwob (1998)
- "The Gipsy Celestina" (1999) by Alfonso Sastre
- "Roberto Zucco" by Bernard-Marie Koltès (2000)
- "Ecos y Silencios" based on "Éxodos" by Sebastião Salgado (2001–2002)

=== Audiovisual Arts Club ===
This Film and Audiovisual Club offers:

- Seminars on Cinema and Literature
- Short Film Festival
- Video workshops
- Projection of different films throughout the year

=== Sport activities ===
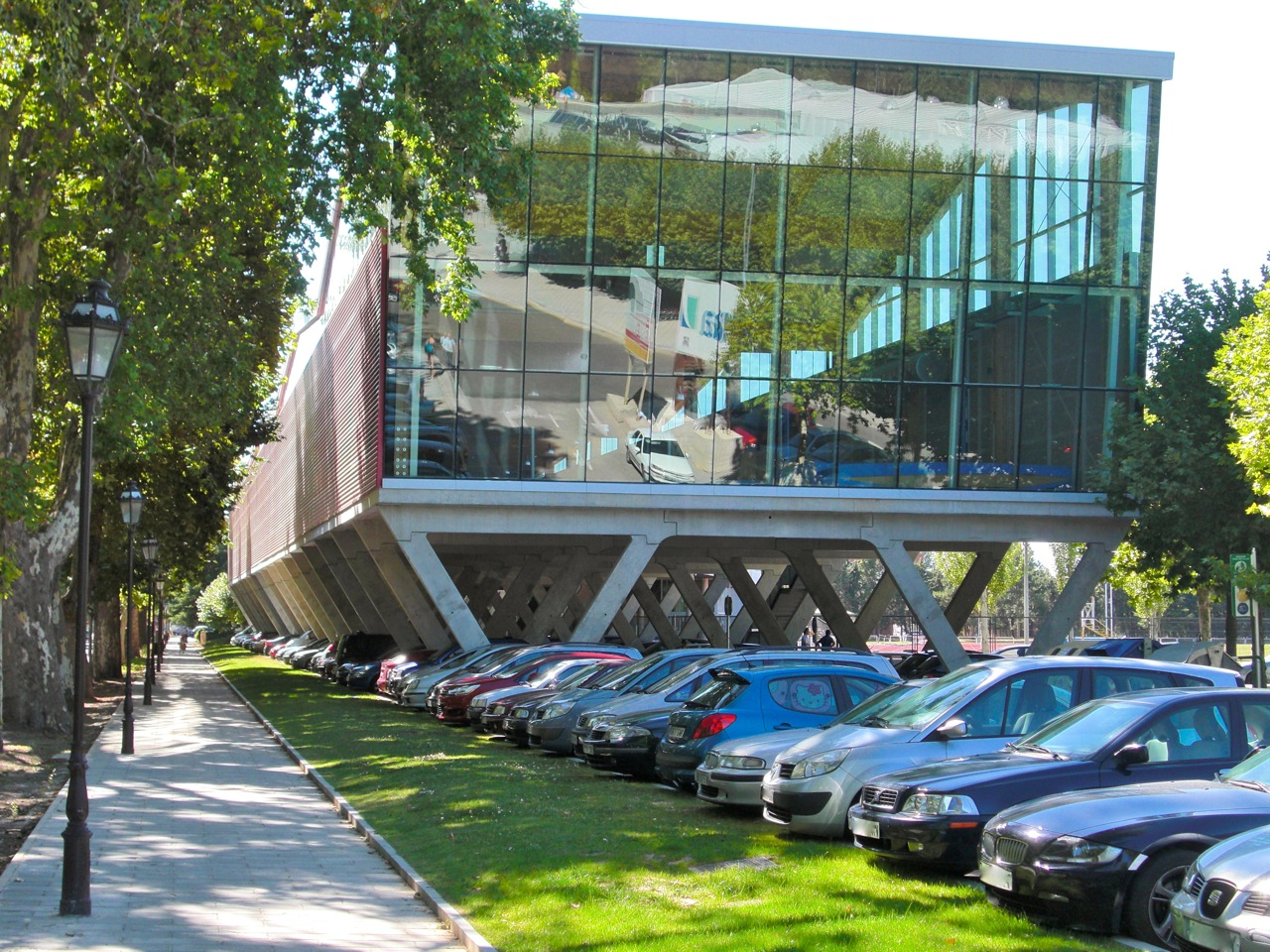
Sports Complex

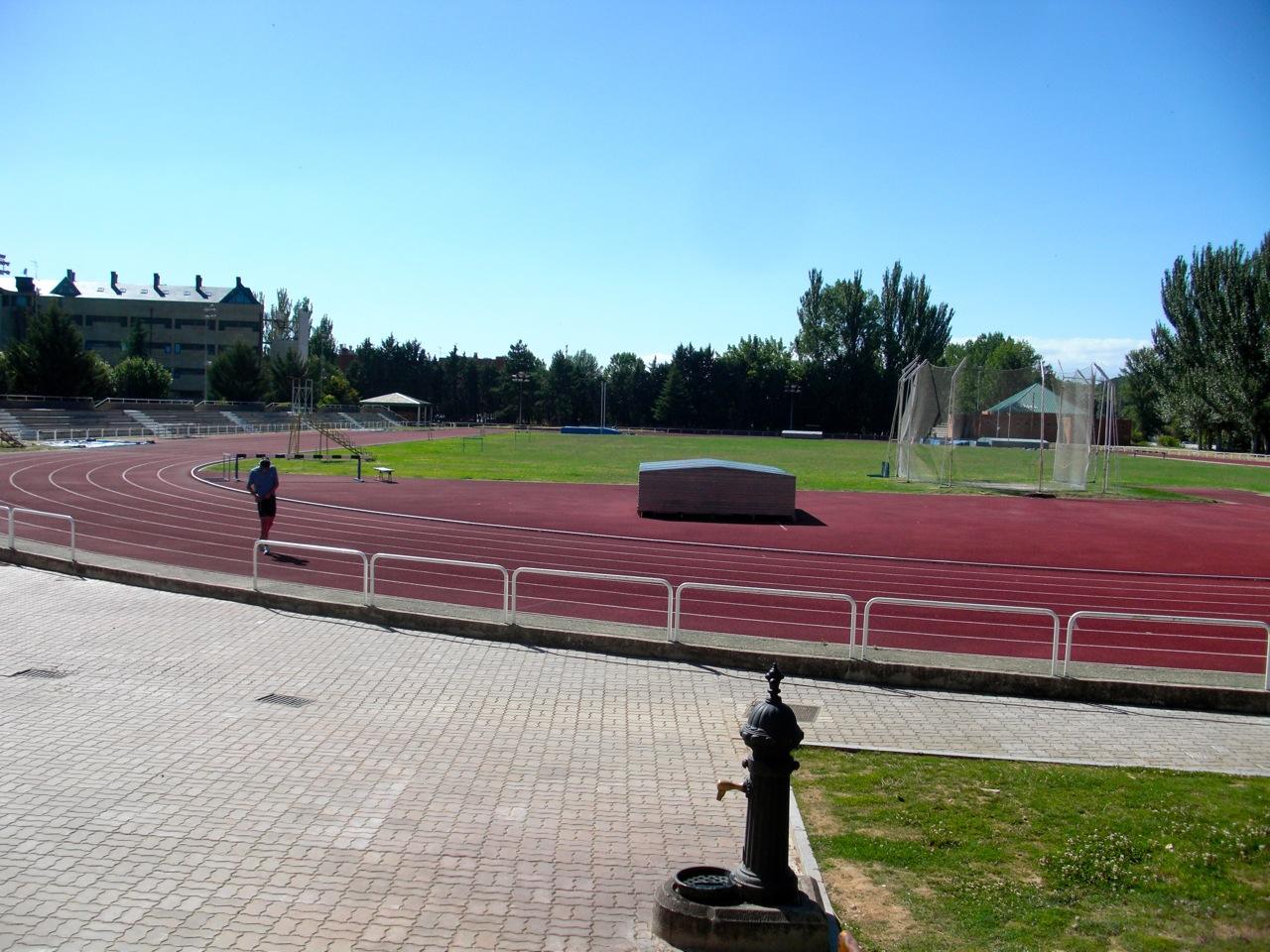
Athletics

The University Sports Services offer a wide range of activities throughout the academic year and include:

- Aerobics
- Archery
- Badminton
- Ballroom dancing
- Basketball
- Climbing
- Fencing
- Fitness training
- Flamenco dancing
- Football
- Golf
- Massage
- Orienteering
- Rugby
- Sauna
- Swimming
- Tennis
- Volleyball
- Weight training
- Yoga

Sports Services also organises student excursions such as bike riding, hiking, skiing, and diving.

== Foreign students ==
Altogether, the University of Burgos has education agreements with over 100 international academic institutions.

The University of Burgos cooperates with the Erasmus Project, a European Union student-exchange programme, and each semester hosts students from various countries across the 27-state European Union, as well as Iceland, Liechtenstein, Norway, Malta and associated countries in Eastern Europe. Other countries, such as Cyprus and Turkey are presently under negotiations to participate in this program in the near future.

In addition, many university students from several regions around the world including China, Latin and North America can participate in exchange programmes to study abroad at the University of Burgos. The North American institutions include Millersville University, San Jose State University, North Dakota State University, The Cooper Union, Boston University, University of West Florida, Western Michigan University and participating campuses of the University of California (UC) system.

== See also ==
- Education in Spain
