= Íñigo de la Serna =

Spanish politician

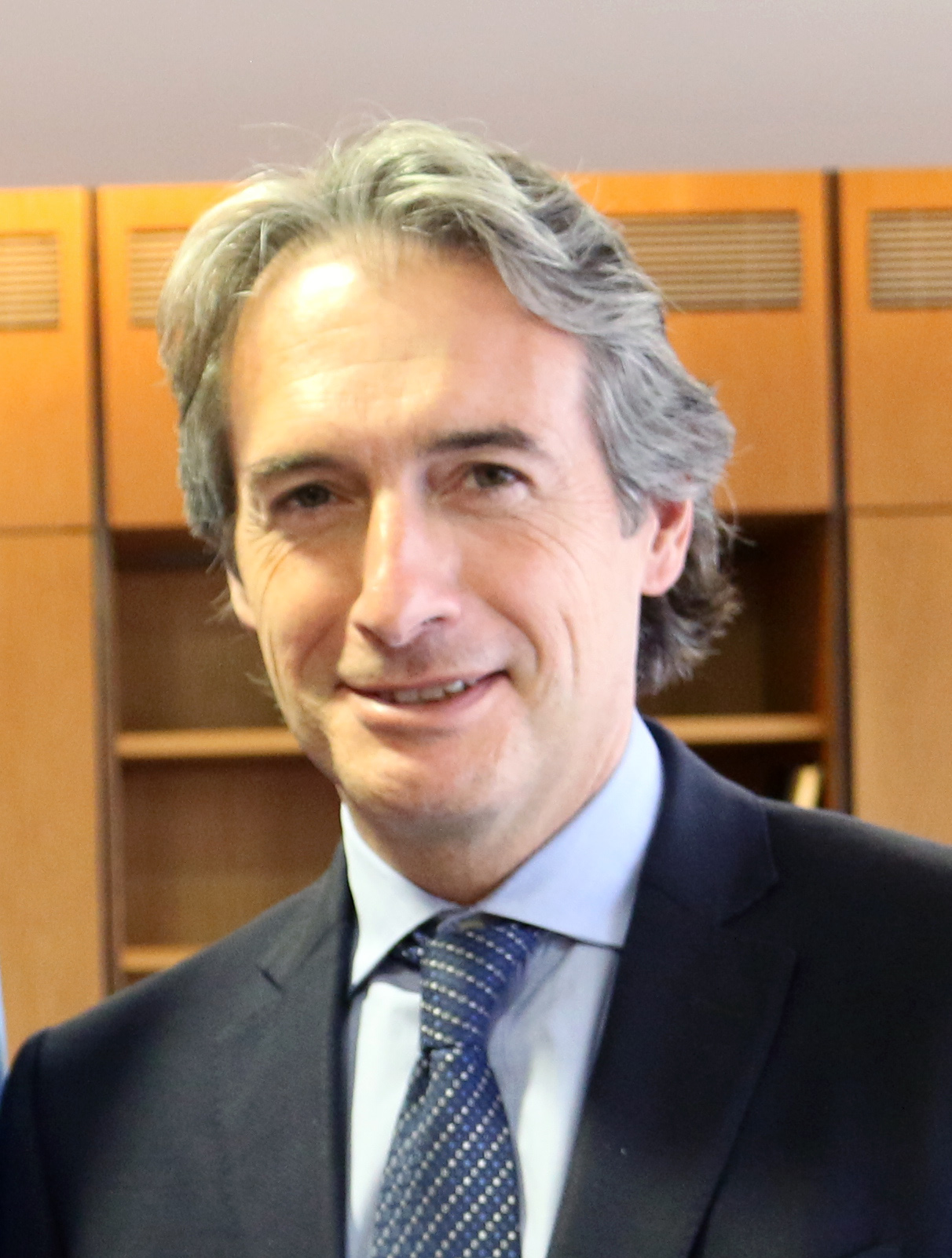
- Íñigo de la Serna in 2017

Minister of Public Works
- In office 4 November 2016 – 1 June 2018
- Monarch: Felipe VI
- Prime Minister: Mariano Rajoy
- Preceded by: Ana Pastor Julián
- Succeeded by: José Luis Ábalos

Mayor of Santander
- In office 16 June 2007 – 4 November 2016
- Preceded by: Gonzalo Piñeiro
- Succeeded by: Gema Igual

President of the Council of European Municipalities and Regions
- In office 26 June 2015 – 12 December 2016
- Preceded by: Annemarie Jorritsma
- Succeeded by: Stefano Bonaccini

President of the Spanish Federation of Municipalities and Provinces
- In office 23 July 2012 – 19 September 2015
- Preceded by: Juan Ignacio Zoido
- Succeeded by: Abel Caballero

Member of the Parliament of Cantabria
- In office 18 June 2015 – 4 November 2016

Councillor of the City Council of Santander
- In office 14 June 2003 – 4 November 2016

Personal details
- Born: Íñigo Joaquín de la Serna Hernáiz; 10 January 1971 (age 55) Bilbao, Spain
- Party: People's Party
- Education: University of Cantabria

Íñigo Joaquín de la Serna Hernáiz (born 10 January 1971) is a Spanish politician and civil engineer. He was the mayor of Santander between 2007 and 2016 and served as Minister of Public Works from 4 November 2016 to 1 June 2018.

== Biography ==
Although born in Bilbao, he has been a resident of Santander during all of his life. An only child, he attended the San Agustín College in the Cantabrian capital and spend his COU year in Ohio, United States as an exchange student, before joining the University of Cantabria School of Civil Engineering, where he graduated as civil engineer. He worked in the Apia XXI engineering office.

His career in politics began in 1999 when he was named chief of the cabinet of the Councilor of Environment of the Government of Cantabria, José Luis Gil. In 2003 he took the office of the Department of Environment, Water and Beaches in the City Council of Santander. In 2004, he was elected Deputy Secretary of the People's Party of Cantabria, and later contested the municipal elections of 2007. Íñigo de la Serna was elected Mayor of Santander, obtaining 15 of the 27 councilors/aldermans (the PSC-PSOE obtained 7 and the PRC the remaining 5).

When he was elected, he became the second youngest mayor of a provincial capital of Spain after Agustín Conde (Conde was elected Mayor of Toledo in 1995 with 30 years), since he was only 36 years old. He obtained an absolute majority with 52% of the votes, this was the first time that this had happened. In the municipal elections of 2011, he revalidated an absolute majority, more broadly, obtaining 18 of the 27 councilors (the PSC-PSOE obtained 5 and the PRC the remaining 4). He became the fourth most voted mayor of Spain obtaining the highest record of his party in the city with 56% of the votes.

As mayor, and thanks to the implementation of the European project SmartSantander, he strongly opted to turn Santander into a referent within the so-called smart cities. In this sense, he advocated from his position as President of the Council of European Municipalities and Regions (CEMR) to promote technological interoperability between the different cities of the European Union that would allow the sharing of information and projects in the field of smart cities. In June 2012, he was elected president of the Spanish Network of Smart Cities.

In the municipal elections of 2015, he lost the absolute majority and remained with 13 aldermans and the 40% of the votes, the best result in a provincial capital for the PP after the fate suffered by the party across Spain. He was reelected mayor thanks to an agreement with the two aldermans from Citizens and that causes all the opposition to vote to its own candidates in the vote of investiture, ruling in minority. The rest of the corporation was made up of 5 PSC-PSOE councilors, 4 from the Regionalist Party of Cantabria, 1 from Ganemos Santander (regional branch of the national party Podemos), 1 from United Left and 1 independent.

From 23 July 2012 to 19 September 2015, he also held the position of President of the Spanish Federation of Municipalities and Provinces (FEMP), following the voluntary resignation of the former president, Juan Ignacio Zoido, being unanimously elected by the members belonging to all the political parties that form the Territorial Council of the same. On 19 September 2015, the presidency of the FEMP was left in the hands of the Socialist, Abel Caballero. He was at the helm of the Spanish Network of Smart Cities since its foundation in 2012 until May 2016. He has also held the presidency of the Council of European Municipalities and Regions.

As mayor he supported the construction of the Botín Center of Art and Culture in a very central zone of the city. after several years of delay.

On 4 November 2016, he was appointed Minister of Public Works of the Government of Spain. 35 days after losing the absolute majority and being mayor of Santander, he supported the creation of a parliamentary commission of investigation on the accident of the Alvia; 180 days later, being minister, he refused to the creation of this commission. After 132 days at the helm of the ministry, he was the third minister to have a Royal Decree-Law rejected by the Cortes, the first in a normal functioning state of government.

After supporting María José Sainz de Buruaga in the party's regional congress of Cantabria, the biggest political crisis in the 21st century of the PP of Cantabria took place. He has also been identified as a possible responsible for the taxi/Uber/Cabify conflict. In August 2017, less than 2 months before the date of the referendum of independence of Catalonia, he announced the presence of the Civil Guard in the security control of the Barcelona Airport after a labor dispute that caused a strike by the security guards.

== See also ==
- Politics of Cantabria
- Government of Spain
