= Juan de Dios Ortúzar =

Chilean industrial engineer (born 1949)

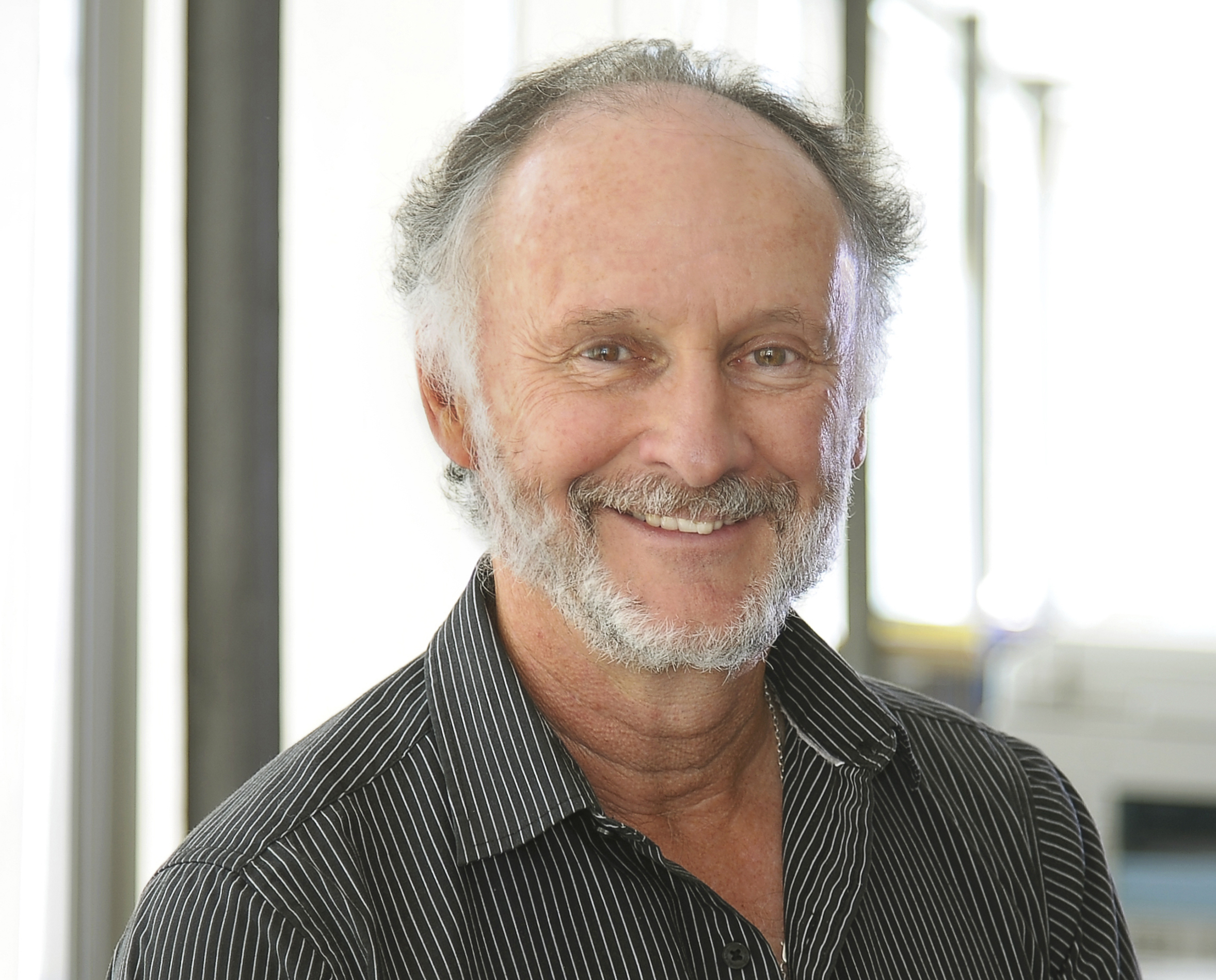
- Born: January 24, 1949 (age 77); Santiago, Chile
- Education: Pontifical Catholic University of Chile (BSc, Civil Eng.); University of Leeds (MSc, PhD)
- Known for: Willingness-to-pay studies; valuation of transport externalities; co-author of Modelling Transport
- Awards: Humboldt Research Award (2010); IATBR Lifetime Achievement Award (2012); Doctor Honoris Causa, University of Cantabria (2018); Premio Eduardo Charreau (2021); World's Top 2% Scientists (Stanford)
- Scientific career
- Fields: Discrete-choice modelling; Transport planning
- Workplaces: Pontifical Catholic University of Chile

Juan de Dios Ortúzar Salas (born 24 January 1949) is a Chilean industrial engineer and Emeritus Professor at the Pontifical Catholic University of Chile (PUC). Regarded as a pioneer of discrete-choice modelling, he developed methods for estimating travellers’ willingness to pay for safer, cleaner and quicker journeys with applications extending into food choice, greywater reuse, social housing and wine preferences.

His work has been cited around 24,000 times on Google Scholar, and he is in Stanford University's World's Top 2% Scientists. He co-authored the textbook Modelling Transport (5th ed., Wiley, 2024), a standard reference in the field that has sold over 20,000 copies and has been translated into Italian and Spanish, with a Russian translation in progress. He served as Co-Editor-in-Chief of Transportation Research Part A from 2012 to 2020.

== Early life and education ==
Ortúzar earned a BSc in mathematics and a civil-engineering degree at PUC in 1971. In 1972 he joined PUC's Department of Transport Engineering, and in 1973 he was awarded a British Council scholarship to study at the University of Leeds, receiving an MSc in transport planning and engineering in 1975. After returning to Chile to work for three years, he took up a research assistantship at Leeds that formed the basis of his PhD thesis on discrete choice modelling, which he received in 1980.

== Academic career ==
Ortúzar became full professor at PUC in 1986 and was named Professor Emeritus in 2016. He directed the first origin-destination survey of Greater Santiago (1991) and launched the city's continuous household travel survey in 2001. He helped found the Institute for Complex Engineering Systems (ISCI) in 2007, of which he remains a key researcher. the Chilean team leading the BRT+ Centre of Excellence for Bus Rapid Transit, where he was a key researcher from 2010 to 2025; and the Centre for Sustainable Urban Development (CEDEUS) in 2012.

Alongside his position at PUC, Ortúzar has held an extensive series of visiting professorships and research fellowships abroad, including at the German Institute for Economic Research (DIW Berlin, where he has been a Research Fellow since 2009), the University of Sydney's Institute of Transport and Logistics Studies (where he is a member of the International Advisory Board), the University of Western Australia, University College London, the Norwegian Institute of Transport Economics (TOI), and the Universities of Cantabria, La Laguna and Politécnica de Madrid in Spain and the Loughborough University Institute of Advanced Studies. He also serves as a Distinguished Visiting Professor at Southeast University, Nanjing, China.

He has supervised 19 PhD and 50 MSc students, many of whom now hold senior positions in academia, government and professional practice across Chile, Latin America and Europe. He has led or advised major transport studies in Latin America and Europe, including highway concession demand analysis in Chile and the Bogotá 2011 mobility survey.

== Research and contributions ==
His research spans three main threads:

Valuation of transport externalities

Combining stated-preference and revealed-preference data, Ortúzar pioneered methods for estimating the value travellers place on reduced accidents, noise and pollution. The valuation techniques developed with his research group have been applied in appraisal studies and legal cases in Australia, Colombia, Germany, Norway and Spain

Discrete-choice methodology

His textbook Modelling Transport, co-authored with Luis G. Willumsen and now in its fifth edition, is widely used as a graduate reference in transport demand modelling. He has also contributed methodological work on hybrid choice models, mixed logit estimation and semi-compensatory choice structures.

Interdisciplinary applications

Ortúzar has extended discrete-choice methods beyond transport, including studies of social-housing location, urban road pricing, greywater reuse, food choice, and Chilean wine preferences the latter through the Understanding Wine Preferences project with PUC's Centre for Aromas and Flavours, and more recently the CORFO-funded WINEOLOGIST™ project (2025–2028) applying hybrid choice models and AI to consumer behaviour in the wine industry.

== Publications ==
Ortúzar has authored or co-authored nearly 250 refereed papers and book chapters [13], in addition to 11 books. The most important, Modelling Transport has been also translated into Italian (2004) and Spanish (2008), with a Russian translation currently underway. He also co-authored Micro-GUTS, a simulation game used to train transport planners at more than 50 academic institutions worldwide.

== Selected works ==
Ortúzar, J. de D. & Willumsen, L.G. (2024) Modelling Transport (5th ed., Wiley).

Caussade, S., Ortúzar, J. de D., Rizzi, L.I. & Hensher, D.A. (2005) Assessing the influence of design dimensions on stated-choice experiment estimates. Transportation Research Part B 39, 621-640.

Sillano, M. & Ortúzar, J. de D. (2005) Willingness-to-pay estimation with mixed logit models. Environment and Planning A 37, 525-550.

Rizzi, L.I. & Ortúzar, J. de D. (2003) Stated preference in the valuation of interurban road safety. Accident Analysis and Prevention 35, 9-22.

Cantillo, V., Ortúzar, J. de D. & Williams, H.C.W.L. (2007) Modelling discrete choices in the presence of inertia and serial correlation. Transportation Science 41, 195-205.

Bahamonde-Birke, F.J., Kunert, U., Link, H. & Ortúzar, J. de D. (2017) About attitudes and perceptions – finding the proper way to consider latent variables in discrete choice models. Transportation 44, 475-493.

Soto, J.J., Cherchi, E., Ortúzar, J. de D. & Rizzi, L.I. "A design-of-designs survey framework to model the presence of alternative heuristics in transport related choices." Transportation Research Part A 213 (2026)

== Honours ==
2010: Alexander von Humboldt Research Award, Alexander von Humboldt Foundation, Germany

2012: IATBR Lifetime Achievement Award, International Association for Travel Behaviour Research

2012: Premio FONDECYT 30 años, National Commission for Science & Technology, Chile

2016: Emeritus Professor, Pontifical Catholic University of Chile

2018: Doctor Honoris Causa, University of Cantabria, Spain

2021: Premio Eduardo Charreau, awarded jointly by the Organisation of American States, the Argentine Association for the Progress of Science, and the Interscience Association, for contributions to Ibero-American scientific and technological cooperation

2023: Member of the World's Top 2% Scientists list (Stanford University/Elsevier), an annually updated ranking

== Editorial and professional service ==
Ortúzar served as Co-Editor-in-Chief of Transportation Research Part A: Policy and Practice from 2012 to 2020. He has since been a member of its Distinguished Advisory Board (since 2021), Associate Editor of Transportation Research Interdisciplinary Perspectives (since 2018), and Associate Editor of Transport Policy (since 2024). He is a founding member of the Institute in Complex Engineering Systems and of the Chilean Academy of Engineering, and a founding member of the Panamerican Society for Transport Research and Logistics.
