= Santakutz cave =

Cave and archaeological site in Gipuzkoa, Spain

Santakutze Cave
- Santakutze kobazuloa
- Interactive map of Santakutze Cave
- 43.2526°N 2.3864°W
- Type: Cave
- Periods: Upper Paleolithic
- Location: Mendaro, Gipuzkoa, Basque Country, Spain

Site notes
- Archaeologists: Munibe group, Suharri association, María José Iriarte, Álvaro Arrizabalaga, César González Sainz

Santakutze Cave is a cave and archaeological site in Mendaro, Basque Country, where several Paleolithic engravings have been discovered. The cave is on the slope of Santakurutz Mountain, 170 meters above sea level, above the Santa Ana Chapel.

The cave was first discovered in 1985 by the Munibe group from Azkoitia. In 2023, additional rock art was found by members of the Suharri cultural association, coordinated by Maria José Iriarte and Álvaro Arrizabalaga from the University of the Basque Country (EHU). The discovery was verified by researcher César González Sainz of the University of Cantabria. Archaeological and artistic analyses concluded that all the engravings date to the same period.

Excavations outside the cave recovered local fauna and lithic materials, indicating that human groups used the cave intermittently. Coprolites and claw marks on the walls show that animals such as bears and hyenas also inhabited the cave. After study, the cave was closed to protect the engravings.

Inside, four small panels of Paleolithic human engravings have been identified, including two unfinished animal figures—a bison and a goat—and several incomplete markings.

== Similar caves in the area ==
In 2018, a similar discovery was made at Agarre Cave in Mendaro, the last of its kind in the region. Agarre contained a pendant and rock art, also dating to the Paleolithic. Research indicates that artistic depictions were made not only on rock surfaces but also on organic materials such as bone. Researchers note that "the discoveries at Santakutze reinforce the importance of the Deba valley in the context of Paleolithic art in Gipuzkoa. The caves of Aizkotxo, Agarre, and Santakutze show that the Mendaro area had a special significance."

== Protection ==
The Basque Government has classified the cave as a Potential Archaeological Site and granted it protected status in 1997.
