= Comillas Foundation =

Spanish foundation

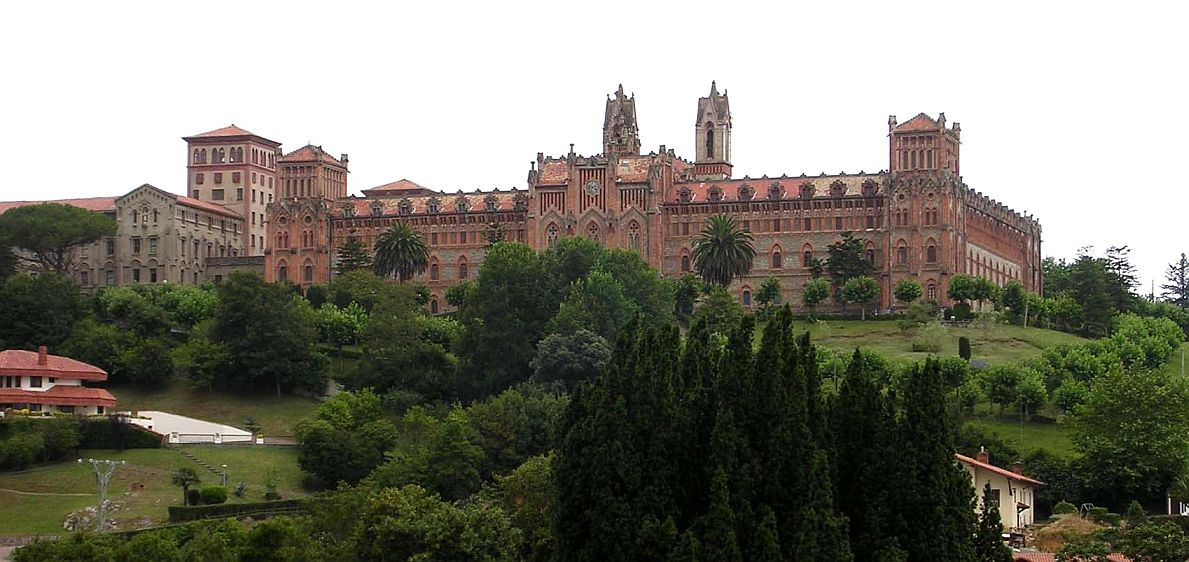
Former Comillas Pontifical University building, Comillas Foundation headquarters

The Comillas Foundation (Fundación Comillas del Español y la Cultura Hispánica) is a private nonprofit organization based in the town of Comillas, Cantabria, Spain. Comillas Foundation, established in 2005, is dedicated to promote Spanish language and Hispanic culture. The academic activities of Comillas Foundation (University Degree in Hispanic Studies and Master in Teaching Spanish as Foreign Language) are developed through the International Center for Higher Spanish Studies (CIESE-Comillas), associated to the University of Cantabria. Besides that, the foundation provides forums and seminars related with Spanish language and culture.

Comillas Foundation headquarters is situated at the former Comillas Pontifical University building (near Seminario Pontificio). Until now, the activities of the foundation were held at the Sobrellano Palace, a few hundred yards from the future location, until the restoration of the buildings are concluded. From May 2010, Comillas’ Foundation activities take place in an historical building entirely renovated.

Courses have been designed to satisfy the specific needs of the target groups, i.e. professionals and executives, companies, institutions, teachers, as well as adults and students of Spanish.

The current Comillas Foundation Chief Executive Officer (CEO) is Mr. Ignacio Gavira Tomás, formerly Head of Administration in the University of La Rioja, and before that, the Director General of Higher Education and Research in the Regional Government of Castile-La Mancha. In August 2009, Mr. Ignacio Gavira Tomás has replaced Dr. Ignacio Rodríguez del Bosque, Professor in the University of Cantabria.

== Board of trustees ==
The most significant members of the Foundation's Board of Trustees are:

- President: Mr. Miguel Ángel Revilla Roiz, President of the Regional Government of Cantabria.
- Vice-president: Ms. Dolores Gorostiaga Saiz, vice-president of the Regional Government of Cantabria.
- Minister of Education of the Government of Spain. (Mr. Ángel Gabilondo Pujol.)
- Minister of Culture of the Government of Spain. (Ms. Ángeles González-Sinde.)
- Councillor for Economics and the Treasury of the Government of Cantabria. (Mr. Ángel Agudo San Emeterio)
- Councillor for Education for the Government of Cantabria. (Ms. Rosa Eva Díez Tezanos)
- Councillor for Culture, Tourism and Sports for the Government of Cantabria. (Mr. Francisco Javier López Marcano.)
- Secretary of State for International Cooperation in the Ministry of Foreign Affairs of the Spanish Government. (Ms. Soraya Rodríguez Ramos)
- Official Representative of the Spanish Government in Cantabria. (Mr. Agustín Jesús Ibáñez Ramos.)
- Director of Instituto Cervantes. (Ms. Carmen Caffarel Serra)
- Mayoress of Comillas. (Ms. María Teresa Noceda Llano)
