= Hong Kong–Spain relations =

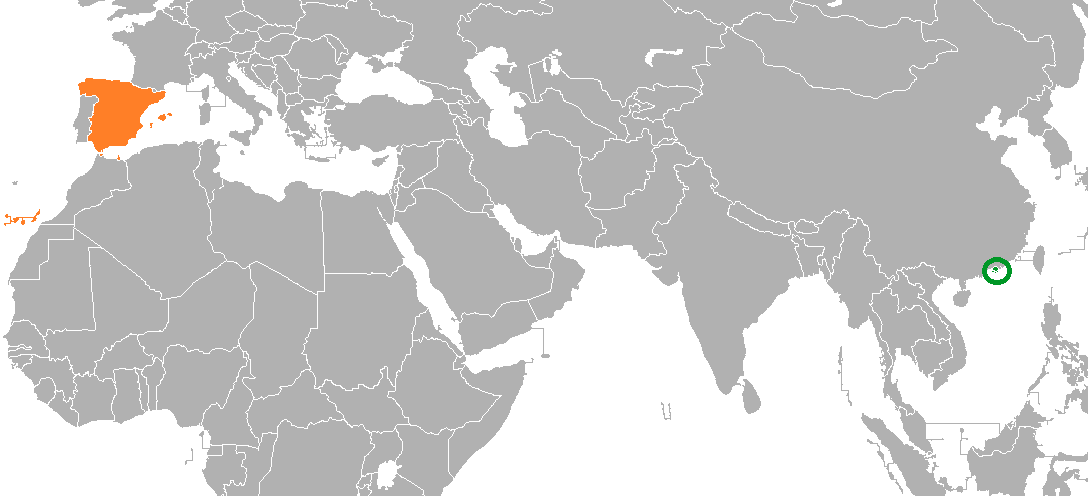
- Hong Kong: Spain

Hong Kong–Spain relations refers to international relations between Hong Kong and Spain.

== History ==
Hong Kong and Spain bilateral relations could be traced back to the Age of Discovery, when Hong Kong was a colony of the Portuguese Empire as Tamão, and a trading outpost of Ming Empire. Scholar has suggested that the Ming Empire and the Spanish Empire's direct contact could be traced back to the 1570s when the Spaniards were able to establish Manila as a trade base. The pre-modern trans-Pacific linkage had a far-reaching impact that touched areas including Hong Kong and Spanish America.

== Representative offices ==
Spain has a Consulate General in Central, Hong Kong. The first Spanish diplomat, which was a vice-consul was sent to Hong Kong in 1856.

The connection between the two continued when the United Kingdom retreated from Hong Kong in 1997. The Hong Kong Economic and Trade Office in Brussels represents Hong Kong in Spain.

== Trade ==
In 2015, total trade between Hong Kong and Spain was US$2.8 billion.

Spain is Hong Kong's tenth largest trading partner in Europe. In 2015, the amount of export totaled US$298M, with broadcasting equipment, electric heaters, and brochures as the major products. On the other hand, Hong Kong is Spain's eighth largest trading partner in Asia, totaled US$956M, with base metal watches, edible offal, and precious metal watches as the major trading products.

== Agreements ==
A tax pact was signed between Chief Secretary of Hong Kong Henry Tang and Spanish Second Vice-president Elena Salgado in April 2011. The tax pact concluded the allocation of taxing rights between the two jurisdictions and the relief on tax rates on different types of passive income. The agreement confirmed that the Spanish withholding tax on interest on Hong Kong residents and the Spanish withholding tax on royalties capped at 5%. The agreement was anticipated to help investors better assess their potential tax liabilities from cross-border economic activities.

== High level visits ==
Hong Kong Secretary for Transport & Housing Anthony Cheung paid an official visit to Madrid in May 2017. He was welcomed by Spanish Ministry of Public Works and Transport Iñigo de la Serna. An air services agreement was reached between Hong Kong and Spain in the visit. The agreement covers a legal framework for establishing air links between Hong Kong and Spain and was anticipated by both governments would promote economic development and cultural exchanges between the two countries.

== Transport ==
In June 2016, Cathay Pacific began direct flights between Hong Kong and Madrid.
