= University of Cantabria School of Civil Engineering =

Engineering school in Cantabria, Spain

Coordinates: 43.4719°N 3.7987°W

- Escuela Técnica Superior de Ingenieros de Caminos, Canales y Puertos de Santander
- Established: December 12, 1963
- Parent institution: University of Cantabria
- Director: José Luis Moura Berodia
- Location: Santander, Cantabria, Spain
- Website: www.unican.es/Centros/en/caminos

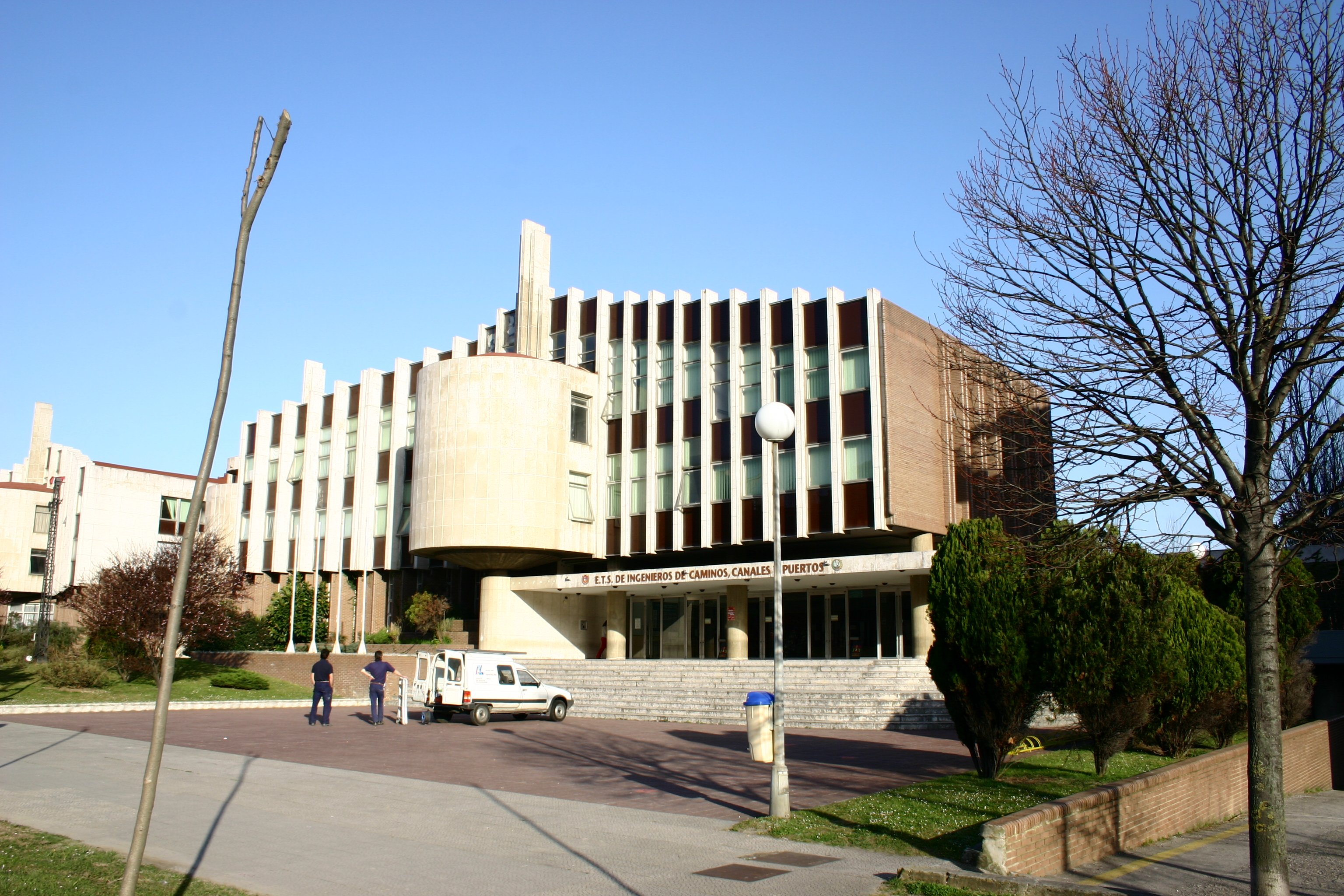
Main building of the school, in Santander, Cantabria

The University of Cantabria School of Civil Engineering is an engineering school of the University of Cantabria.

The school ranks 5th in Spain in the civil engineering schools' ranking by El Mundo just behind the schools of the Technical University of Madrid, the Polytechnic University of Catalonia, the Polytechnic University of Valencia and the University of Castile-La Mancha.

It is the second oldest civil engineering school in Spain, behind the school of the Technical University of Madrid.

== History ==
The School was established on December 12, 1963, as a school of the University of Valladolid, starting classes in 1966. It was the second civil engineering school at the time, when there was only one in Madrid since 1802.

During the first years, the school had to use some facilities from the Menéndez Pelayo International University until new buildings were constructed.

In 1972, the school became one of the constituent members of the new University of Santander, later University of Cantabria.

== Programs ==
The school offers Bachelor's, Master's and Ph.D. degrees in civil engineering.

== Students exchange programs ==
The school has exchange programs with over 30 universities around the world, but the two most successful ones are the programs with the École nationale des ponts et chaussées in France and the Cornell University College of Engineering, in the United States.
