= Seminario Pontificio =

Coordinates: 43.3875°N 4.2967°W

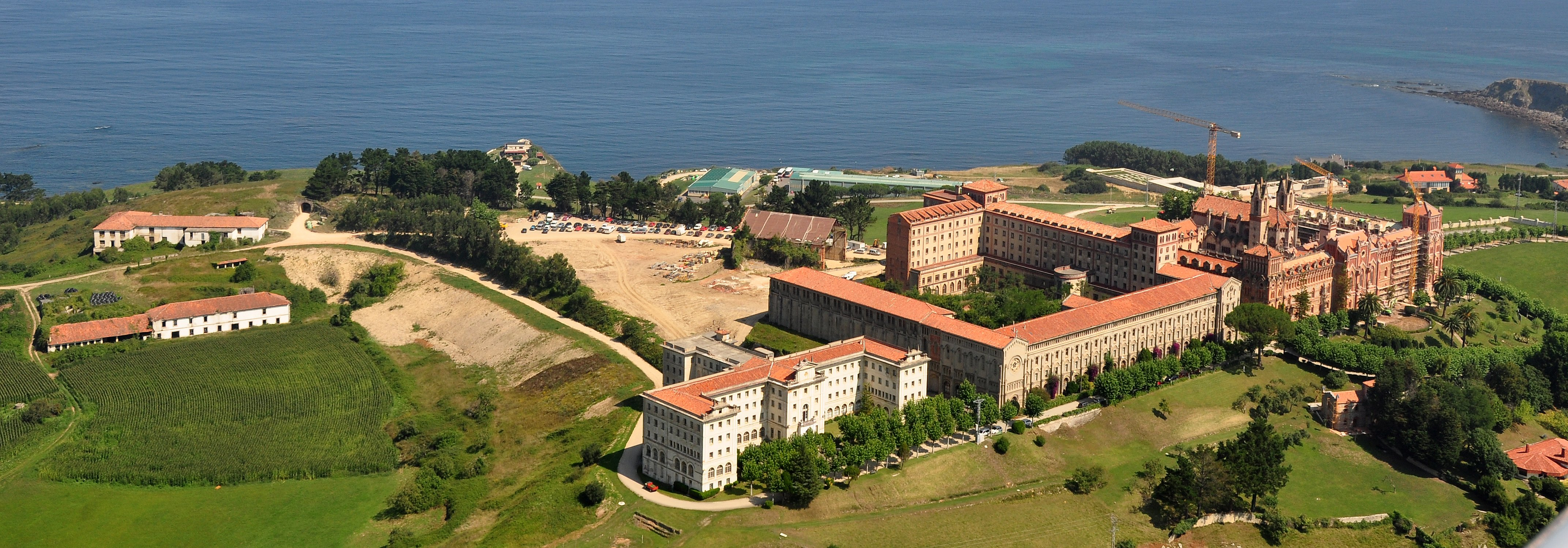
Aerial view of Seminario Pontificio

Seminario Pontificio (Spanish for Pontifical Seminary) is a hamlet located in the Spanish municipality of Comillas, in the province of Cantabria. As of 2008, it had no inhabitants.

== See also ==
- Comillas Pontifical University
