= Red de Bibliotecas Universitarias Españolas =

Network of academic libraries in Spain

The Red de Bibliotecas Universitarias Españolas (REBIUN; English: University Libraries Network) facilitates cooperation among academic libraries in Spain. It formed in 1988, and in 1996 absorbed the Conferencia de Directores de Bibliotecas Universitarias y Científicas Españolas (COBIDUCE). Since 1998 it represents library interests in the Conferencia de Rectores de las Universidades Españolas.

== History ==
Founding membership of REBIUN consisted of libraries of the Universidad de Alcalá de Henares, Universitat de Barcelona, Universidad de Cantabria, Universidad Nacional de Educación a Distancia, Universidad de Oviedo, Universidad del País Vasco, Universitat Politècnica de Catalunya, Universidad de Santiago de Compostela, and Universidad de Sevilla.

== See also ==
- List of libraries in Spain
- List of library consortia
