= University of Valladolid =

Public university in Spain

Coordinates: 41°39′08″N 4°43′17″W

- Universidad de Valladolid
- Seal of the university
- Motto: Sapientia Aedificavit Sibi Domvm (Latin)
- Motto in English: Wisdom (has) built a house for itself
- Type: Public
- Established: c. 1241; 785 years ago
- Rector: Pilar Garcés García
- Students: 19,000
- Location: Plaza de Sta. Cruz, nº 8 47002. Valladolid, Valladolid, Palencia, Soria and Segovia, Castile and Leon, Spain
- Website: www.uva.es

University rankings

Global – Overall
- ARWU World: 901–1000 (2023)
- QS World: 901-950 (2026)
- THE World: 1201–1500 (2024)
- USNWR Global: =1198 (2023)

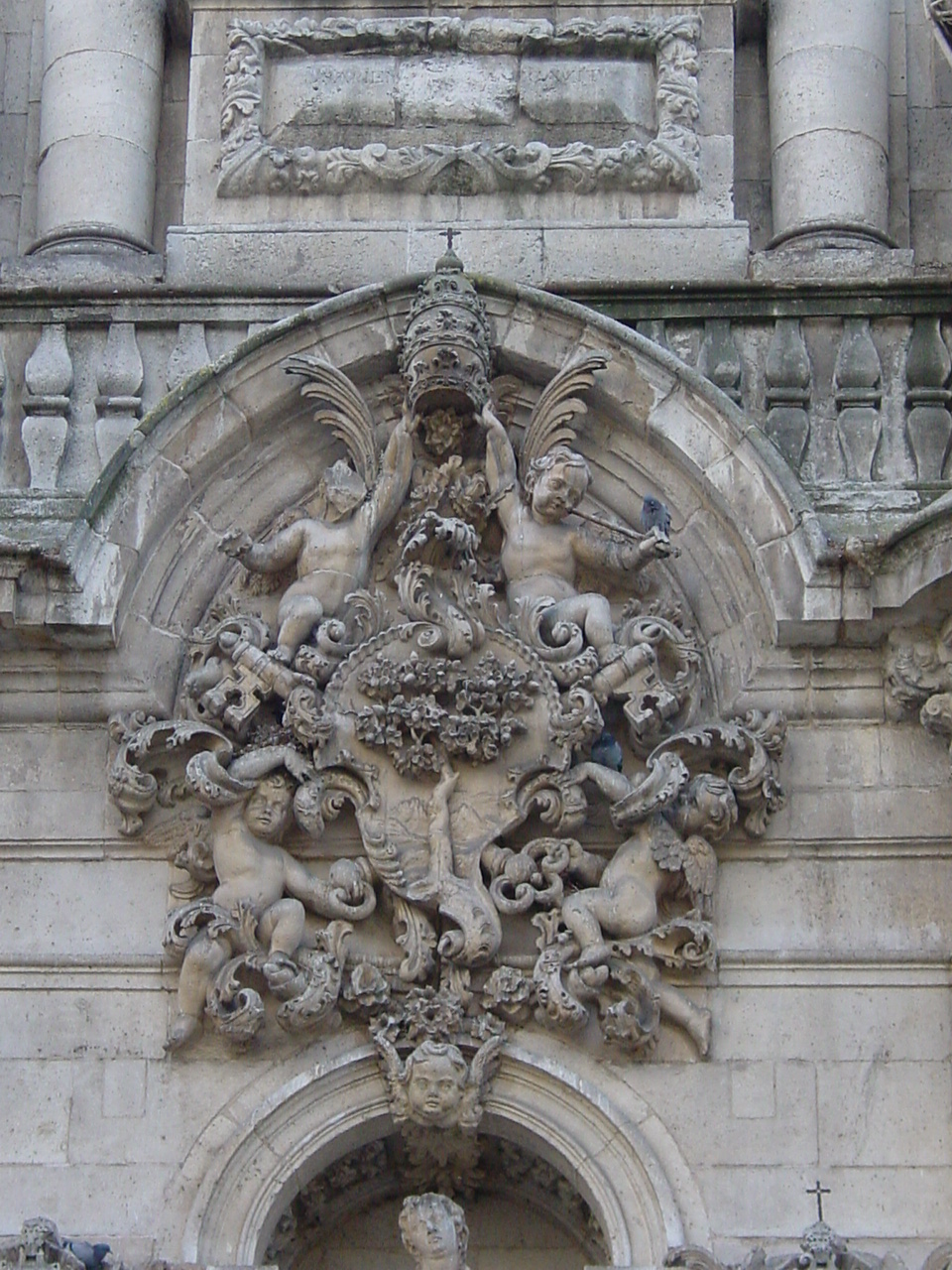
The emblem of the University of Valladolid sculpted into the façade of the School of Law

The University of Valladolid (UVa; Spanish: Universidad de Valladolid) is a public university located in the city of Valladolid, Valladolid province, autonomous region of Castile and Leon, Spain. Established in the 13th century, it is one of the oldest universities in the world. The university has 19,000 undergraduate students and more than 2,480 professors.

== History ==
The University of Valladolid (UVa) is a Spanish public university founded in 1241 as removal of studies at the University of Palencia, founded by Alfonso VIII of Castile, between 1208 and 1212. It is responsible for teaching higher education in seven campuses distributed through four cities of Castile and Leon: Valladolid, Palencia, Soria and Segovia.

== Buildings ==
The first building of the university that is notable for its architecture is the one constructed at the end of the 15th century, after the move of the institution from the Colegiata. It consists of a four sided cloister, which opens up the hallways, and a late Gothic chapel. At the cloister one enters through a portal, also late Gothic, that opens to the Bookshop Street. At the beginning of the 18th century, this became insufficient, prompting an enlargement consisting of a quadrangular cloister with four galleries that open to hallways built at the same time.

From the Plaza de Santa María (today the University Square), one can see the Baroque façade designed by the Carmelite Fray Pedro de la Visitación and constructed in 1715. There are sculptural groups that represent allegories of the subjects that are taught in the building. The central section, organized into four columns of giants, is finished off by a giant ornamental comb.

In 1909, and with great controversy, it was decided to destroy the old building, including the entrance hall from the 15th century that opened to Bookshop Street, in order to construct a new building following a design by the architect Teodosio Torres. The Baroque façade was kept.

Torres's design featured two cloisters. A staircase was situated between both cloisters and a great vestibule opened to Bookshop Street. The façade of the university building to this street was based on a reinterpretation of the Baroque façade of Fray Pedro, with a mixture of Plateresque, Baroque and Neoclassical decorative elements. At one side of the façade was an observation tower and on the other was a new clock tower that filled the corner between the University Sq. and Bookshop St.

The project experienced problems as the Baroque façade was incorporated slowly. In 1939, the building suffered a fire. To alleviate the problem of the façade's integration into Torres's building, Constantino Candeira designed a great staircase and vestibule, in the historicist style, that was accessed through the Baroque façade. The staircase is an example of the triumphalist and historicist architecture of Postwar Spain.

In 1968 the building was finished with the destruction of the second cloister and the construction of a five-floor building to house students, and the destruction of Torres's building which had been built for far fewer students. In this same reform, the observation tower and the great auditorium of 1909. The façade that faces Librería was remodeled, losing the vestigial historicism of Torres. The new auditorium flanks the façade of Fray Pedro on one of its sides.

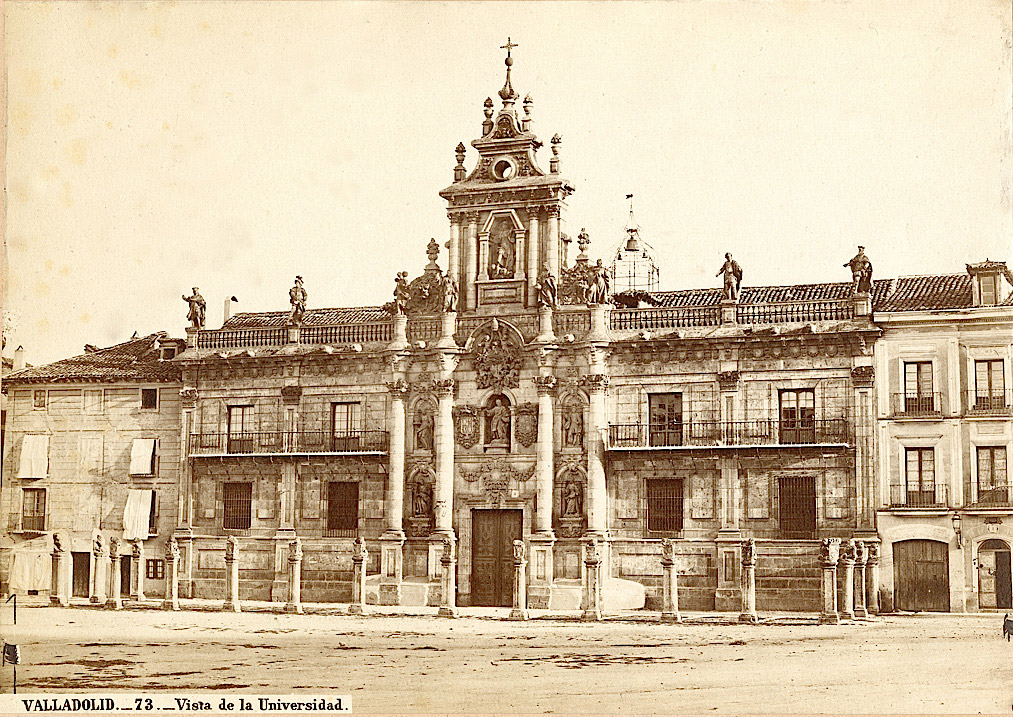
University of Valladolid by Juan Laurent, c. 1865, Department of Image Collections, National Gallery of Art Library, Washington, DC

The computer science department has hosted programming contests for the Association for Computing Machinery using online judging of the submitted programs.

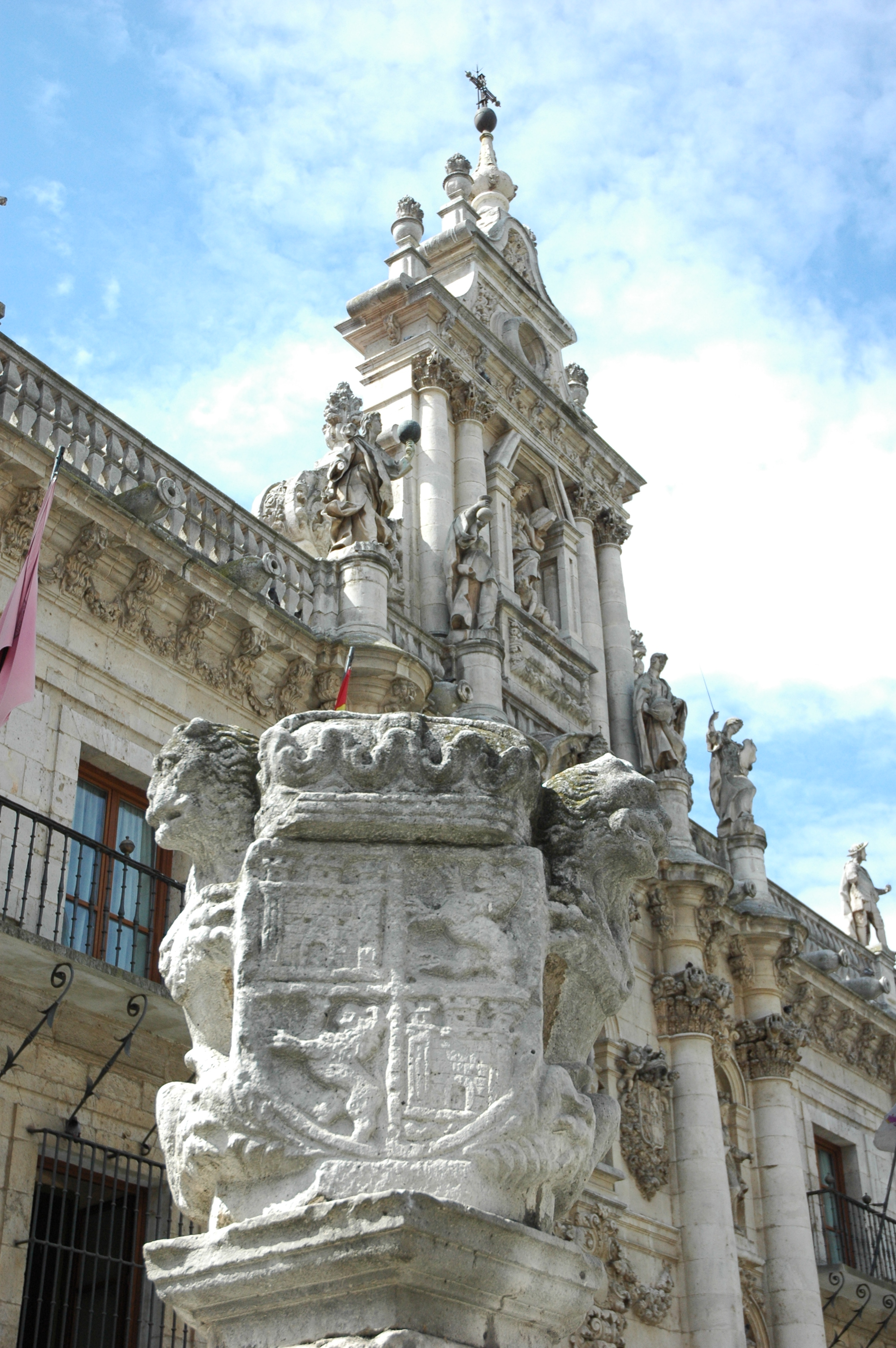
Baroque façade (1715) of the university building, now housing the Faculty of Law

== Culture ==
Within the university there are cultural associations for music and theatre.

The youth symphonic orchestra: the Joven Orquesta de la Universidad de Valladolid (Youth Orchestra of the University of Valladolid, JOUVa) is run by students of the university, and headquartered in the Residencia Universitaria Alfonso VIII of Valladolid. Since its founding in 1998 Francisco Lara Tejero has been the artistic musical director.

The choir, the Coro de la Universidad de Valladolid (Choir of the University of Valladolid), is directed by Marcos Castán and the Early Music Group El Parnasso.

The theatre group is Gente de Teatro de la Uva, founded in 1984 with the name of People's Theatre of the Faculty of Medicine, that from 1998 became the official theater group of the university. Its director is Carlos Burguillo.

Through the Area of Extension and Culture, the university presents cultural programs throughout the year, with special emphasis on the UniversiJazz Festival and Santa Cruz.

Valladolid University supports cultural initiatives such as those developed by the Hermandad Universitaria del Santo Cristo de la Luz, which includes Christmas and Auto Passion. It assists in the concerts that are organized through each Vice President for University Association and with public and private partnerships.

== Spanish Courses for International Students ==
The University of Valladolid established courses for international students during the 1948–1949 academic year, under the rectorship of Cayetano de Mergelina y Luna. The courses were held at the Colegio Mayor Santa Cruz. They were founded and directed by Gratiniano Nieto Gallo.

The university offers Spanish Language and Culture courses for international students, including intensive courses and semester-long programs. The spring semester program offers five specialized tracks: Humanities (History, Literature and Art), Advanced Spanish Language Skills, Spanish for Business, Spanish for Healthcare, and Language Teaching Methodology.

According to the Language Centre, students have come from countries including the United States, Italy, Australia, South Korea, Japan and Taiwan. The courses also include cultural activities, and accommodation options include stays with Spanish host families.

== Library ==
The university library has 14 library services: they are located in Palencia, Soria and Segovia provinces, the rest are situated in Valladolid, each of them have a director. All the services are managed by a Chief Librarian and coordinated by Central Services. The book collection is available through the Almena Catalogue and UVaDoc repository.

The collection has 970,000 books, some of which are important; for example its ancient book collection has 45,000 titles including manuscripts and incunabulum of 10th century. Periodicals: 16,000 titles, E-journals: 21,000 titles, E-books: 900, Data bases: 66., Theses and Masters projects: 33,000. Library Services: Website, reading room, interlibrary and intercampus loan, loan (book collection), computers, e-books, bibliographic information, user education online through Moodle, subject guides, and tutorials.

The library is a member of OCLC, Europe Direct, REBIUN, Dialnet, Catálogo 17, ABBA, Documat, REDINED y BUCLE.

== See also ==
- List of oldest universities in continuous operation
- List of medieval universities
