= University of Cantabria =

Spanish university

Coordinates: 43.473°N 3.801°W

- Universidad de Cantabria
- Latin: Cantabriae Universitas
- Type: Public
- Established: 1972
- Endowment: € 112.77 million (2019)
- Rector: Ángel Pazos Carro
- Academic staff: 1,267
- Administrative staff: 1,088
- Students: 14,205
- Undergraduates: 11,668
- Postgraduates: 2,537
- Doctoral students: 635
- Location: Santander, Torrelavega and Comillas, Cantabria, Spain
- Website: www.unican.es

University rankings

Global – Overall
- ARWU World: 901–1000 (2023)
- USNWR Global: =611 (2023)

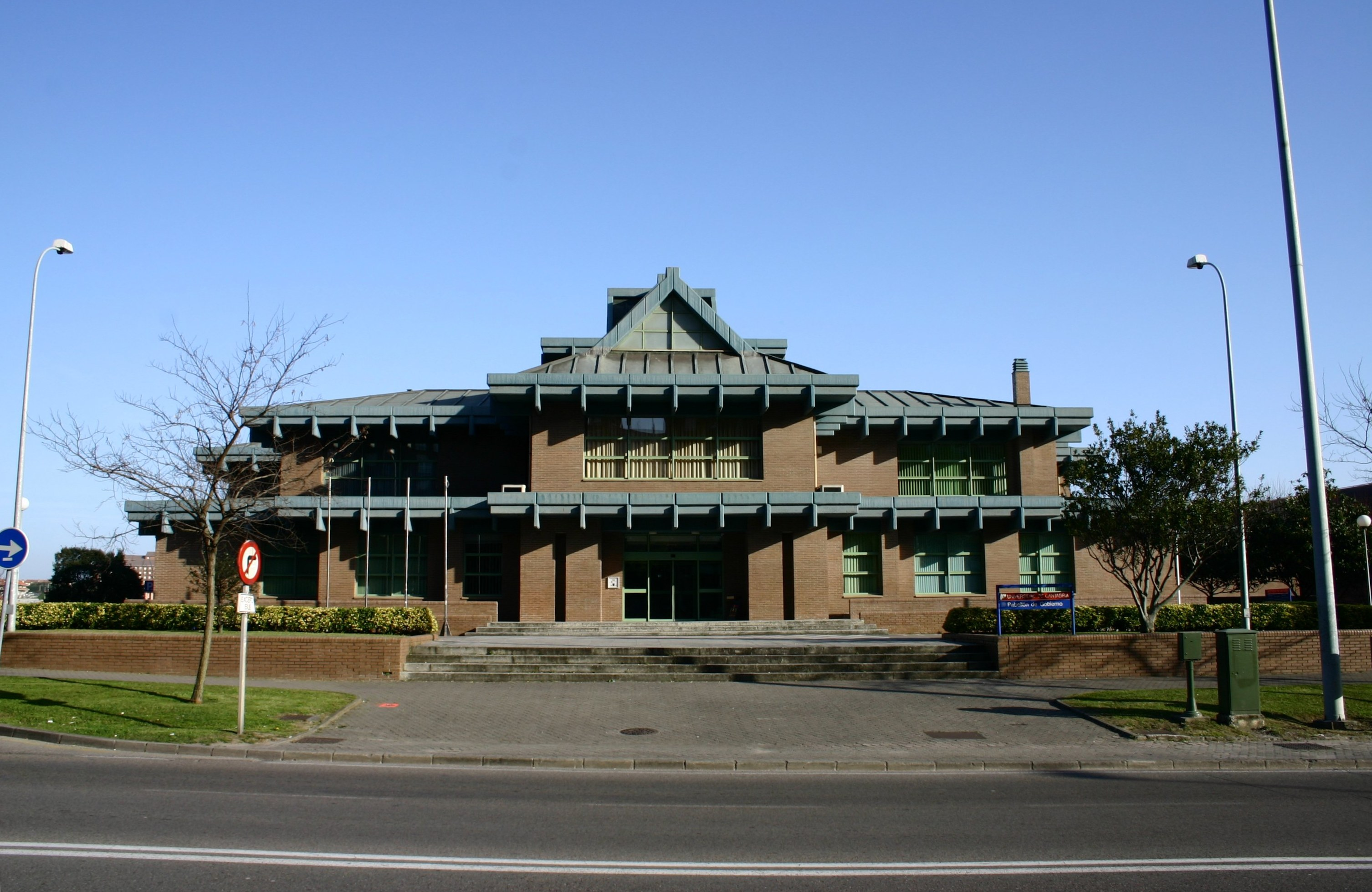
University of Cantabria: Government Pavilion.

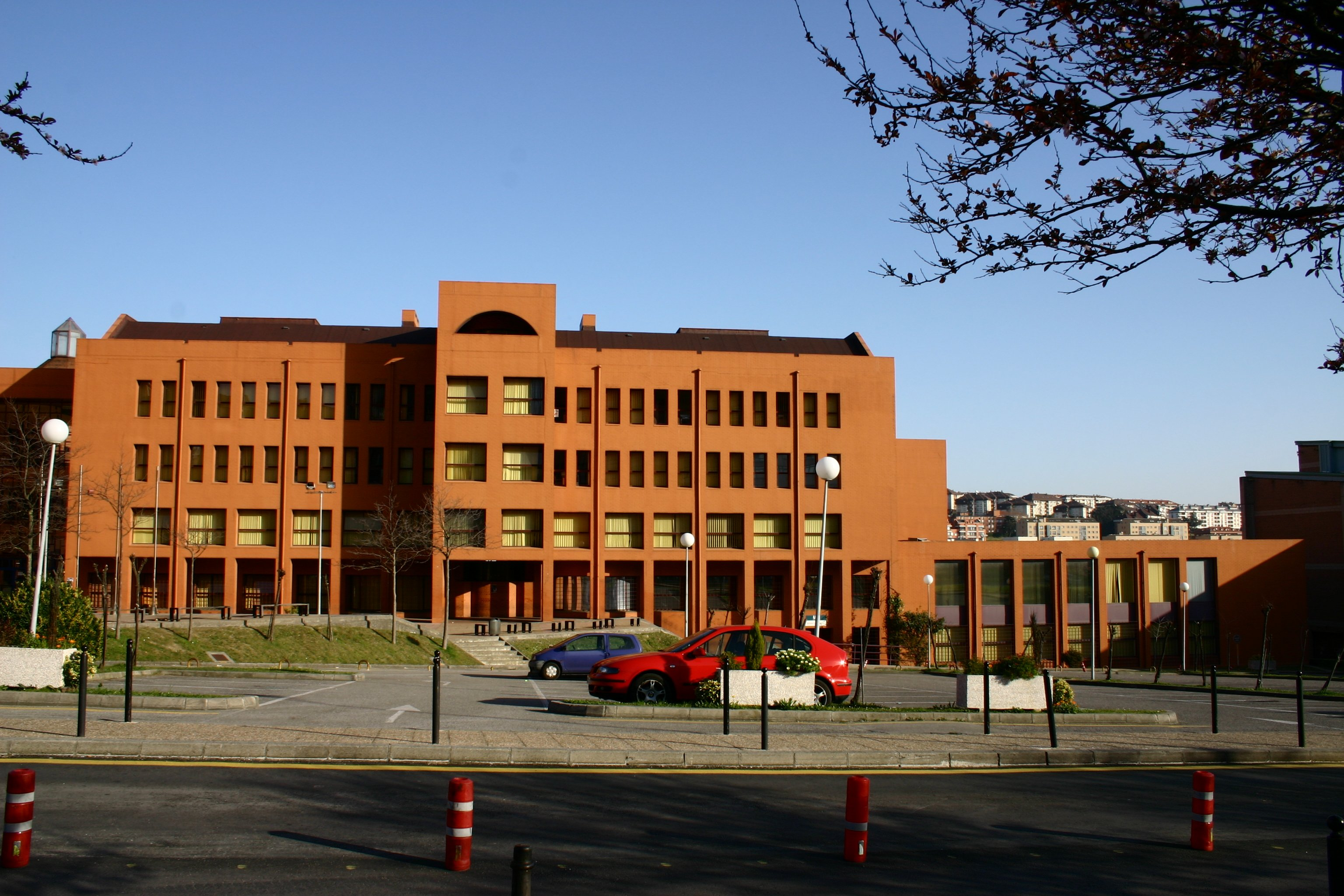
University of Cantabria: Interfaculty Building, Faculty of Humanities and School of Teacher Training .

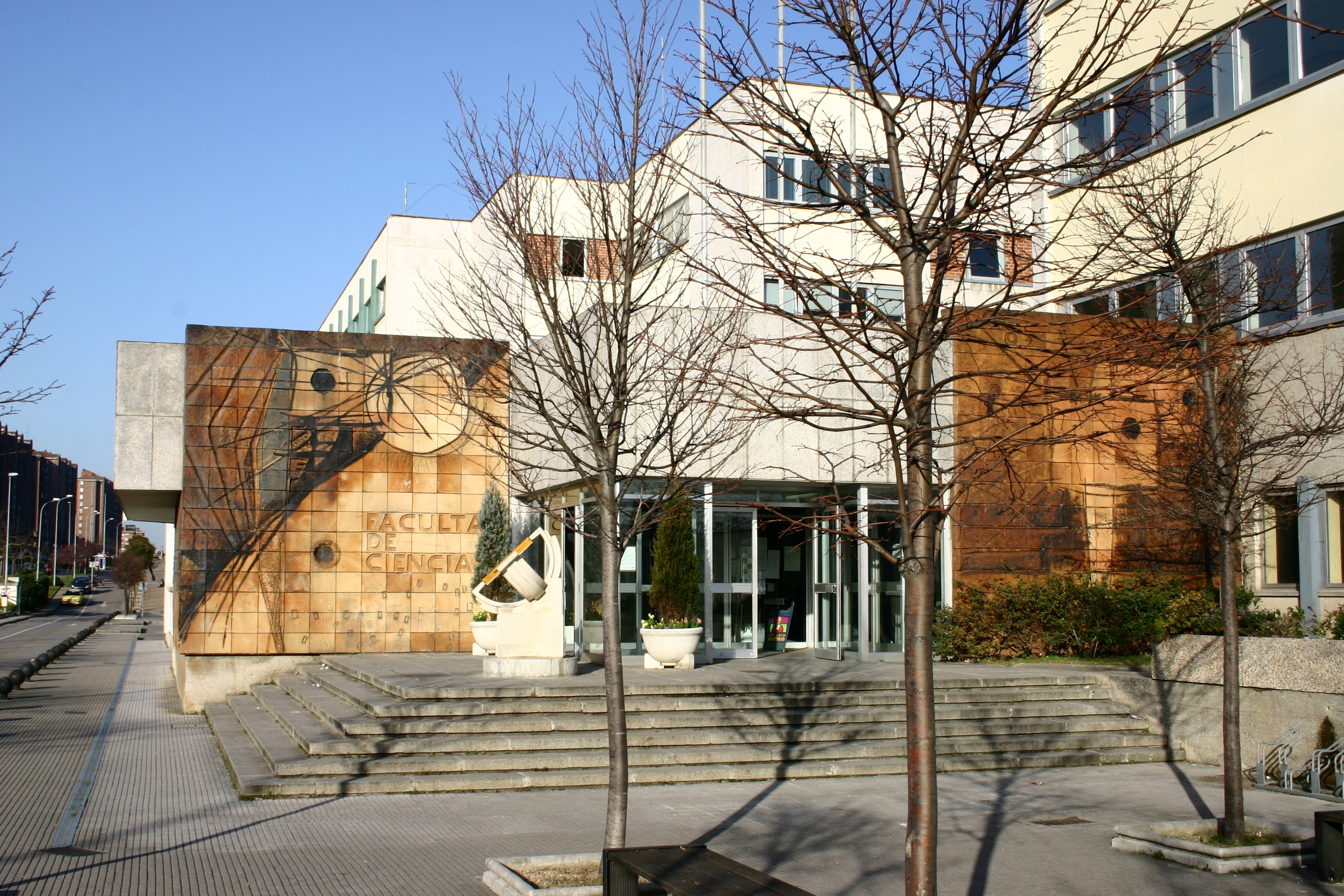
University of Cantabria: Faculty of Sciences.

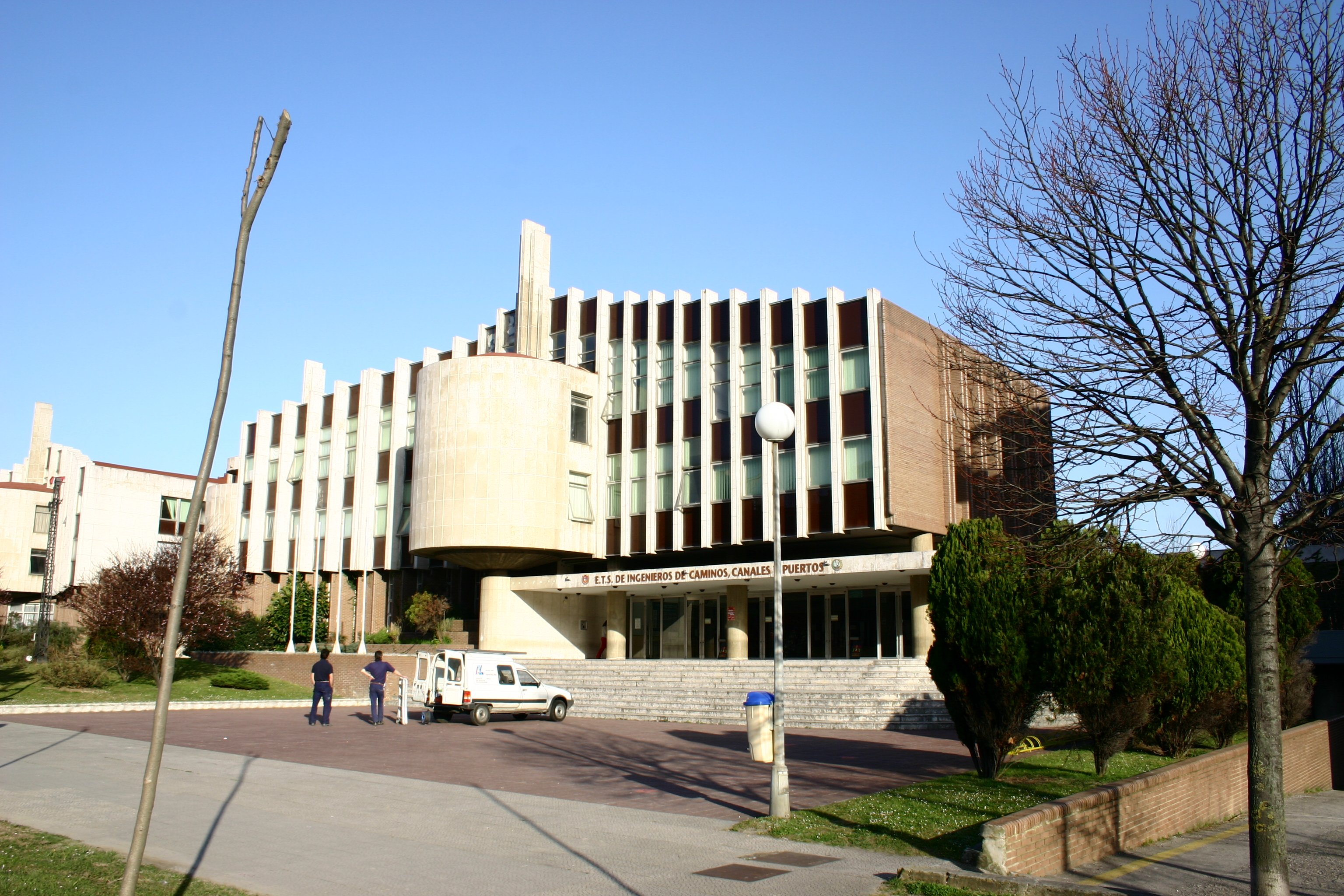
University of Cantabria: School of Civil Engineering.

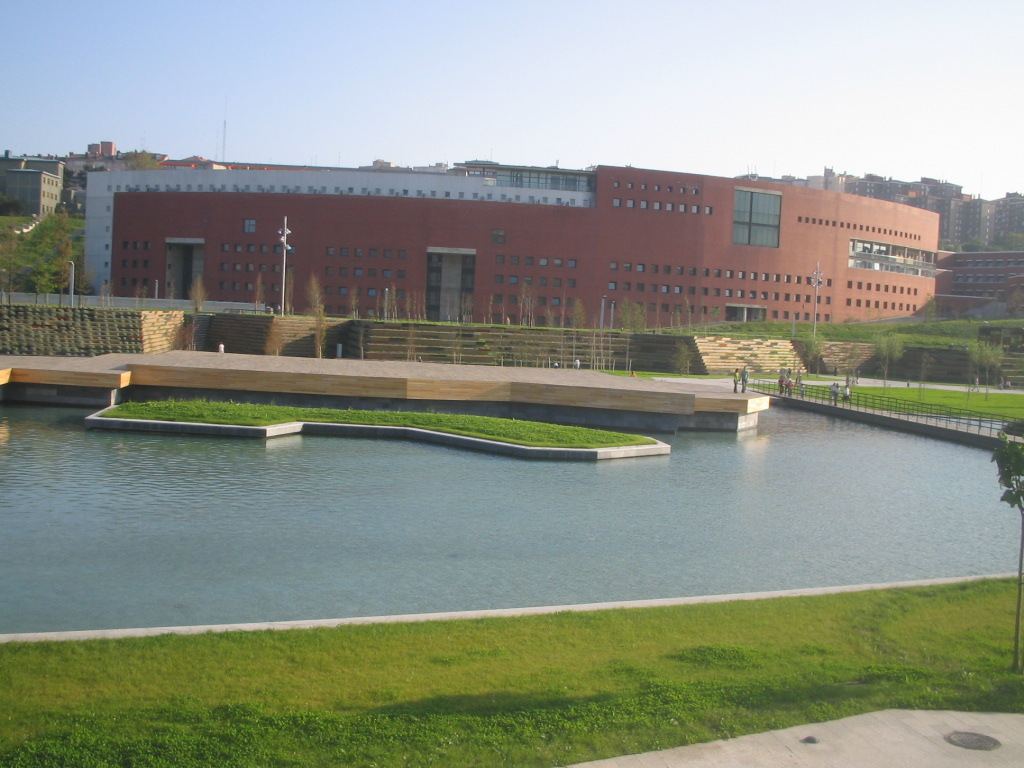
University of Cantabria: School of Industrial Engineering and Telecommunications, from the Atlantic Park of Las Llamas.

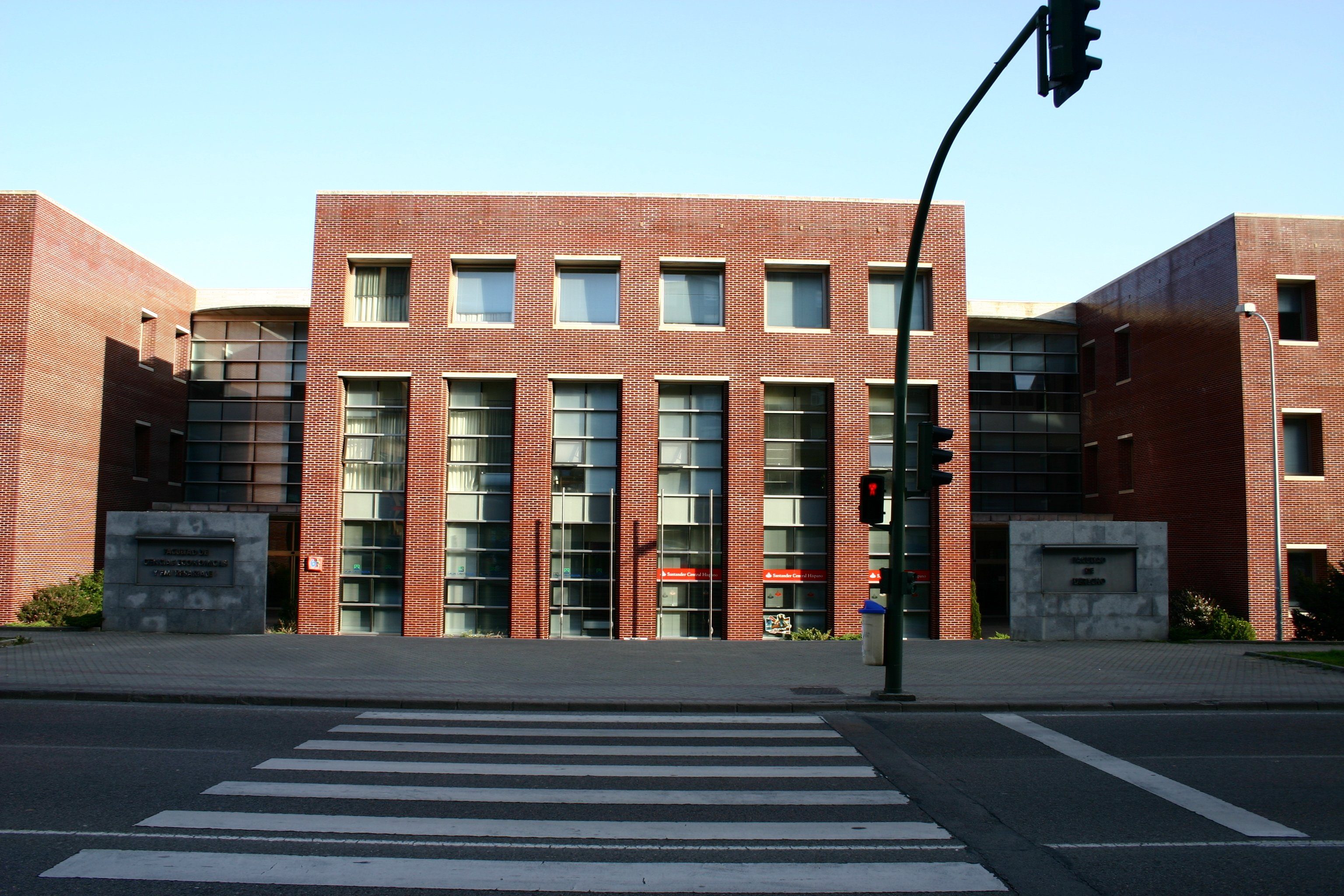
University of Cantabria: Faculty of Economics and Business Studies and Faculty of Law.

The University of Cantabria (UC) (Spanish: Universidad de Cantabria) is a public university located in Santander, Torrelavega and Comillas in Cantabria, Spain. It was founded in 1972 and comprises 15 schools and colleges.

It was selected as Campus of International Excellence by the Government of Spain in 2009. The UC is part, as a founding member, of the Group 9 of Spanish Universities (G9), created in 1997 with the aim of promoting collaboration between academic institutions. It is also integrated into the European alliance of universities EUNICE (European University for Customized Education).

The University of Cantabria first appeared in the Academic Ranking of World Universities in 2013 in the range of 151-200 best universities in the world in the field of Physics. Since 2018, it has been present as an institution among the top 1,000 universities in the Shanghai Ranking, in addition to several of its specialized thematic categories.

== Organization ==
The University of Cantabria is divided in 15 schools and faculties.

- Faculty of Sciences
- Faculty of Humanities
- Faculty of Medicine, associated with the Marqués de Valdecilla University Hospital
- Faculty of Economics and Business Studies
- Faculty of Law
- International Center for Higher Spanish Studies
- Altamira School of Tourism
- Gimbernat-Cantabria School of Physiotherapy
- School of Education
- School of Civil Engineering
- School of Industrial Engineering and Telecommunications
- School of Nautical Studies
- School of Nursing "Casa de Salud Valdecilla," related to the Marqués de Valdecilla University Hospital.
- School of Mining & Energy Engineering

== History ==
The institution was established as such on August 18, 1972, by decree of the Council of Ministers of Spain with the name of University of Santander. Thirteen years later renamed University of Cantabria. It was created by the affiliation of several schools and colleges that were already established either independently or under other universities since the following dates:

- 1829: The School of Commerce and Navigation, currently School of Nautical Studies.
- 1901: The School of Industries, the origin of which is the Polytechnic School of Industrial Engineering and Telecommunications.
- 1915: The Normal School, which is the origin of the current Faculty of Education.
- 1929: The Valdecilla Hospital School of Nurses, School of Nursing today.
- In the 50s Torrelavega welcomes School of Mines and Mining-Metallurgical and Mining-Chemical Factories, which will become the School of Technical Mining Engineering.
- 1966: School of Civil Engineering, under the University of Valladolid.
- 1969: School of Social Graduate, then belonging to the University of Oviedo and origin of the Diploma in Labour Relations attached to the School of Law.
- 1969: College of Sciences, initially only with the specialty of Physical and dependant of the University of Valladolid.

In 1970 the City and Province Council of Santander gave the grounds of Las Llamas in the city of Santander to create a campus of 600,000 square meters for the new university. In 1971 the University District of Santander was established. In 1973 the Medical School was established. In 1978 the new College of Humanities consolidated the autonomy of the University of Cantabria.

== International Programs ==
The UC has signed 216 agreements with European Universities (Erasmus program), 64 with Latin American institutions, 8 with universities in the United States and 1 with an Australian university, sending and receiving more than 600 exchange students within this framework. Additionally, the UC has partnered with International Studies Abroad, a U.S.-based study abroad organization to bring in study abroad students from the U.S. and Canada. The UC is a member of both national and international university networks such as the Compostela Group of Universities and the Santander Network.
