= Ourense Cathedral =

Roman Catholic church in Ourense, Galicia

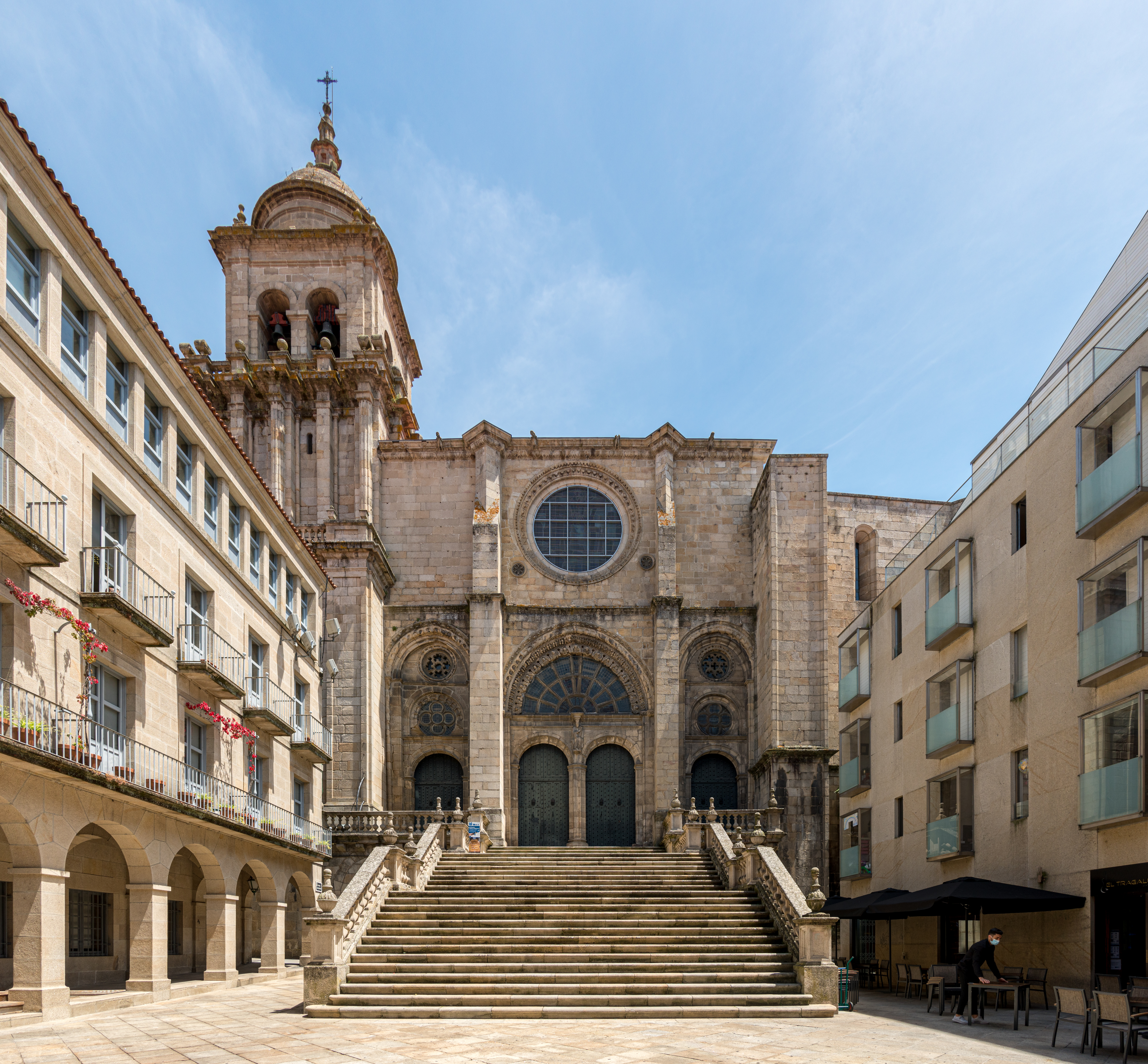
- West façade and monumental stairway.

Religion
- Affiliation: Roman Catholic
- Diocese: Ourense

Location
- Location: Ourense, Galicia, Spain
- Interactive map of Ourense Cathedral
- Coordinates: 42.336444°N 7.862861°W

Architecture
- Type: church
- Style: Mainly Gothic
- Completed: 1220

The Ourense Cathedral (Catedral de Ourense or Catedral do San Martiño) is a Roman Catholic church located in Ourense in Galicia. Dedicated to St Martin, it was founded in 550. The first structure was restored by Alonso el Casto. The present mainly Gothic building was raised with the support of Bishop Lorenzo Hispano in 1220. Its local patroness is Saint Euphemia. There is a silver-plated shrine, and others of St Facundus and St Primitivus. The Christ's Chapel (Capilla del Cristo Crucificado) was added in 1567 by Bishop San Francisco Triccio. It contains an image of Christ, which was brought in 1330 from a small church on Cape Finisterre. John the Baptist's Chapel (Capilla de San Juan Bautista) was created in 1468 by the Conde de Benavente. The Portal of Paradise is sculptured and enriched with figures of angels and saints, while the antique cloisters were erected in 1204 by Bishop Ederonio. The Capilla de la Maria Madre was restored in 1722, and connected by the cloisters with the cathedral. The eight canons were called Cardenales, as at the Cathedral of Santiago de Compostela, and they alone did services before the altar; this custom was recognised as "immemorial" by Pope Innocent III, in 1209. The cathedral, which has undergone an impressive transition of architectural styles of Romanesque, Gothic, Renaissance, Baroque and Neoclassical, was built to a Latin Cross plan. It has been a functional basilica since 1887. The cathedral has a crucifix that is held in great reverence all over Galicia.

== History ==
The earliest cathedral in Ourense appears to have been the church dedicated to Santa María la Madre. In 550, the Suevian king Chararic built a second church dedicated to St Martin of Tours on the site of today's cathedral of the Auriense diocese. It was also the time when the arch bridge opposite the cathedral was built over the river, facilitating access to the thermal springs. The cathedral was however repeatedly destroyed over the centuries by the Moors and the Northmen who invaded the city. Today's building was constructed as a Romanesque church in the 12th and 13th centuries. Construction was supported by Bishop Lorenzo, who also built the new Ourense bridge and the bishop's palace. Gothic additions followed until the early 16th century. There is little historical documentation on the construction of the building but there is a clear record mentioning the consecration of the high altar in 1188.

The cathedral was classified as a national monument in June 1931. Since 1887, it has officially been designated a basilica.

== Architecture ==
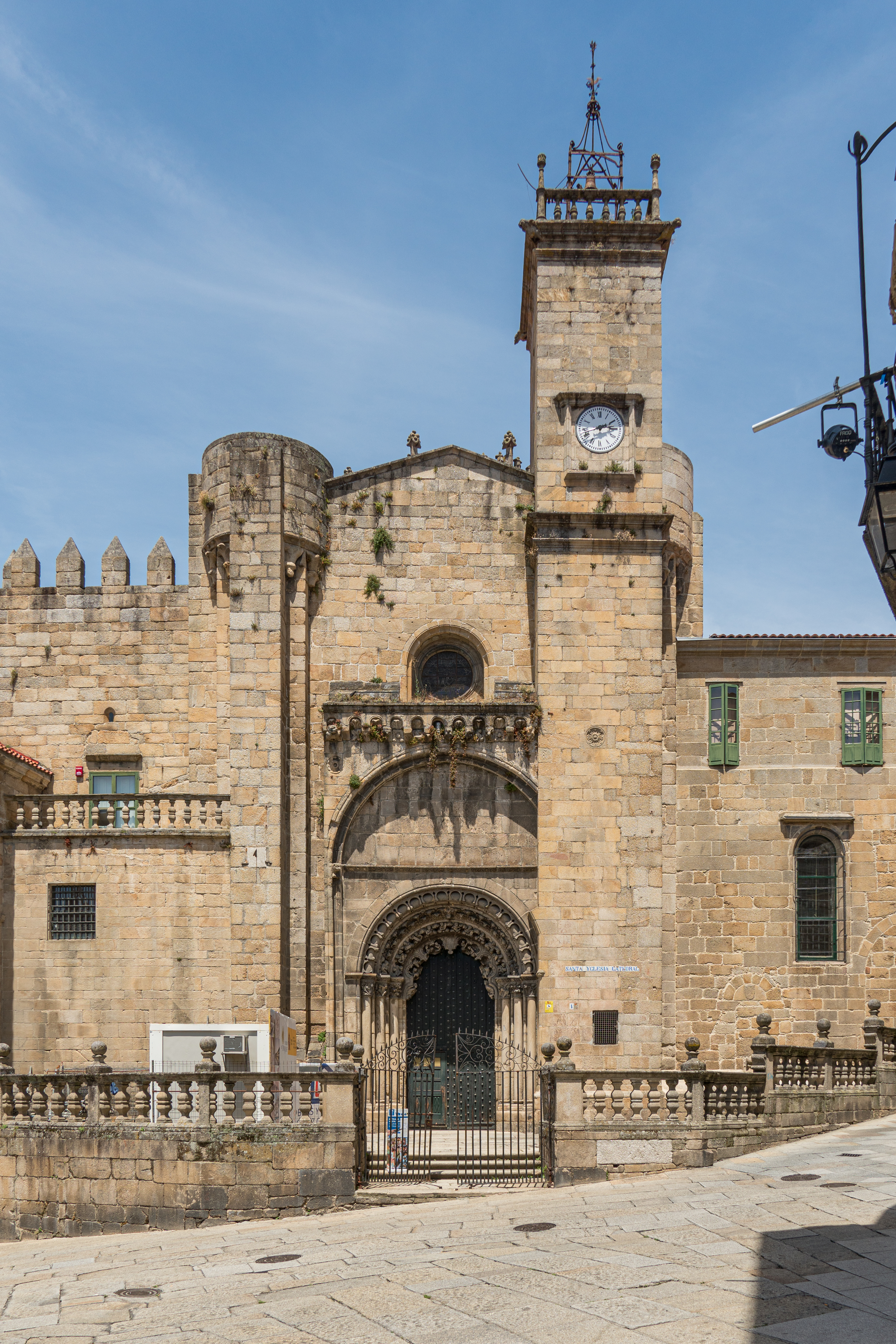
The south façade.

The cathedral plan takes the form of a Latin cross, the nave being flanked by slightly lower lateral aisles. It measures 84 m (276 ft) in length and 43 m (141 ft) across the transversal transept. Completed in 1505 by Rodrigo de Badajoz, the octagonal Gothic lantern tower with its three levels of windows rises above the point where the transept crosses the nave. The former apse was later converted into an ambulatory bordered by a series of chapels including the 15th-century St John's Chapel (Capilla de San Juan) and the 16th-century Chapel of Snows (Capilla de las Nieves). After the chancel had been demolished in the 20th century, the choir stalls were moved into the body of the church and into Christ's Chapel.

The North Door (Portada Norte), initially of Romanesque design, has a variety of Gothic additions. The tympanum is crowned by a cross where Mary takes possession of Christ's body. Other decorations include an allusion to the miracle of St Martin who is depicted tearing his cloak in two as well as the figure of James the apostle (known as Santiago in Spanish). The turrets on either side of the entrance are no doubt the result of the need to protect the doorway which had been destroyed by Rodrigo Alonso Pimentel in 1471.

To the right of the South Door (Portada Sur) which is topped by fine decorations, there is a 16th-century clock tower. The south façade was initially symmetrical with two defensive towers but the clock tower now looks less imposing. The east gable is flanked by the unfinished 16th-century Tower of St Martin and the 40-metre-tall bell tower which was repaired at the end of the 19th century as it had been damaged by the earthquake which hit Lisbon in 1755. The 16th-century rose window can still be seen.

== Interior ==
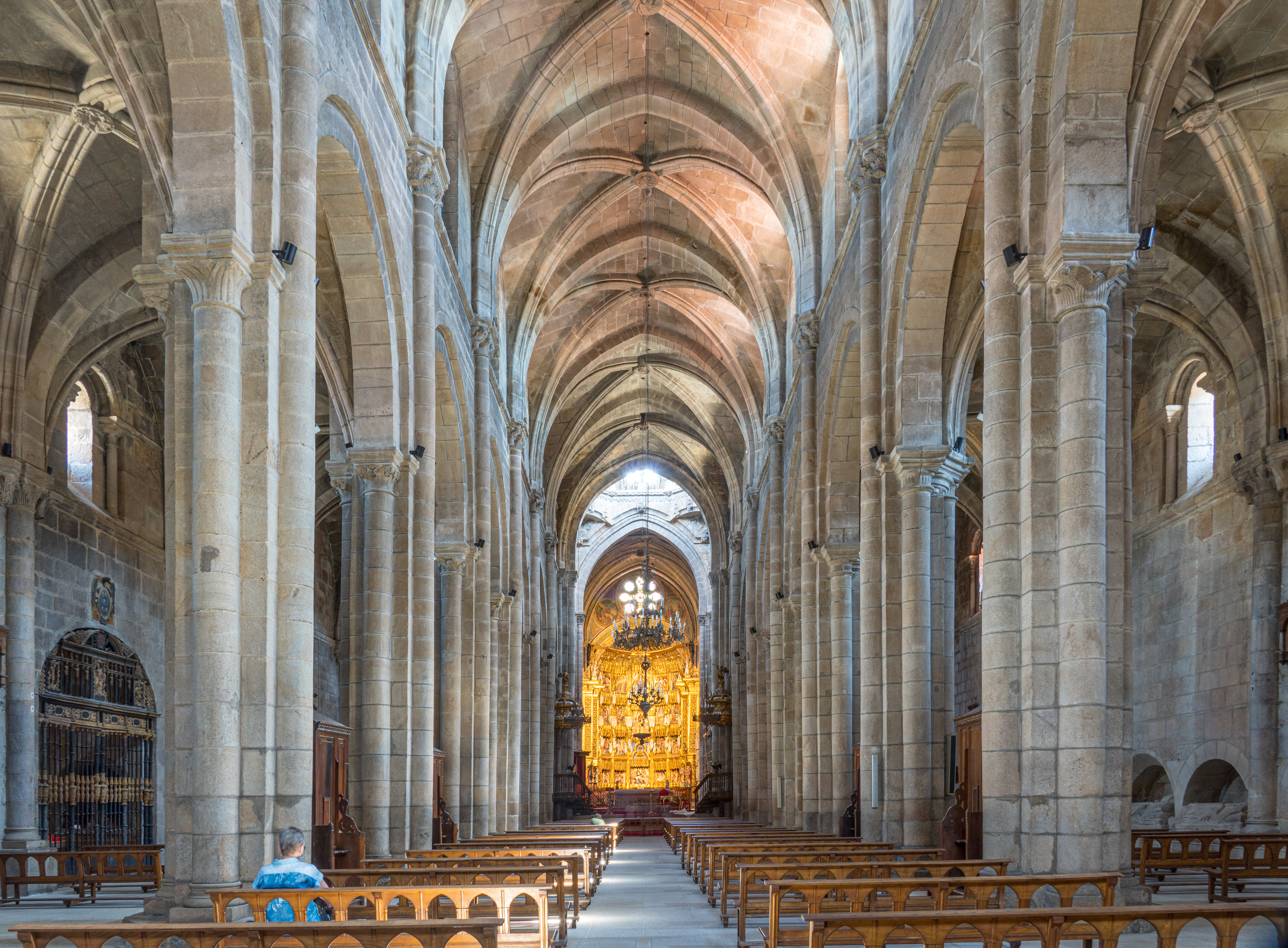
View of the central nave.

The Gothic influence can be clearly seen in the nave with its decorative arches and vaulted ceiling. Repairs and additions have also led to decorations in the Renaissance and Baroque styles in the chapels. The cathedral's main altarpiece in the flamboyant Gothic style is believed to be the work of Cornielles de Holanda with five vertical panels each divided into horizontal compartments. Martin of Tours is depicted in the central panel as the cathedral's patron saint while scenes from the life of Jesus and Mary can be seen in the other panels. On either side of the main altar, there are two other altars representing the martyred saints of Ourense: Facundus, Primitivus and Euphemia.

Christ's Chapel (La capilla del Santo Cristo), to the right of the North Door, originally presented the figure of Christ rather than today's altar bearing Our Lady of the Pillar. The chapel owes its origin to Bishop Vasco Pérez Mariño who wished to be buried as close as possible to the figure of Christ. The chapel is decorated in flamboyant Baroque style with a Renaissance screen by Juan Bautista Celma and a canopy by Domingo de Andrade while other decorations are the work of Francisco de Castro Canseco. The Renaissance choir stalls which once stood in the cathedral's chancel were crafted by Diego de Solís and Juan de Angers. The chapel also contains many other offerings including 18th-century paintings with scenes of Christ's life and the evening meal at Emmaus.

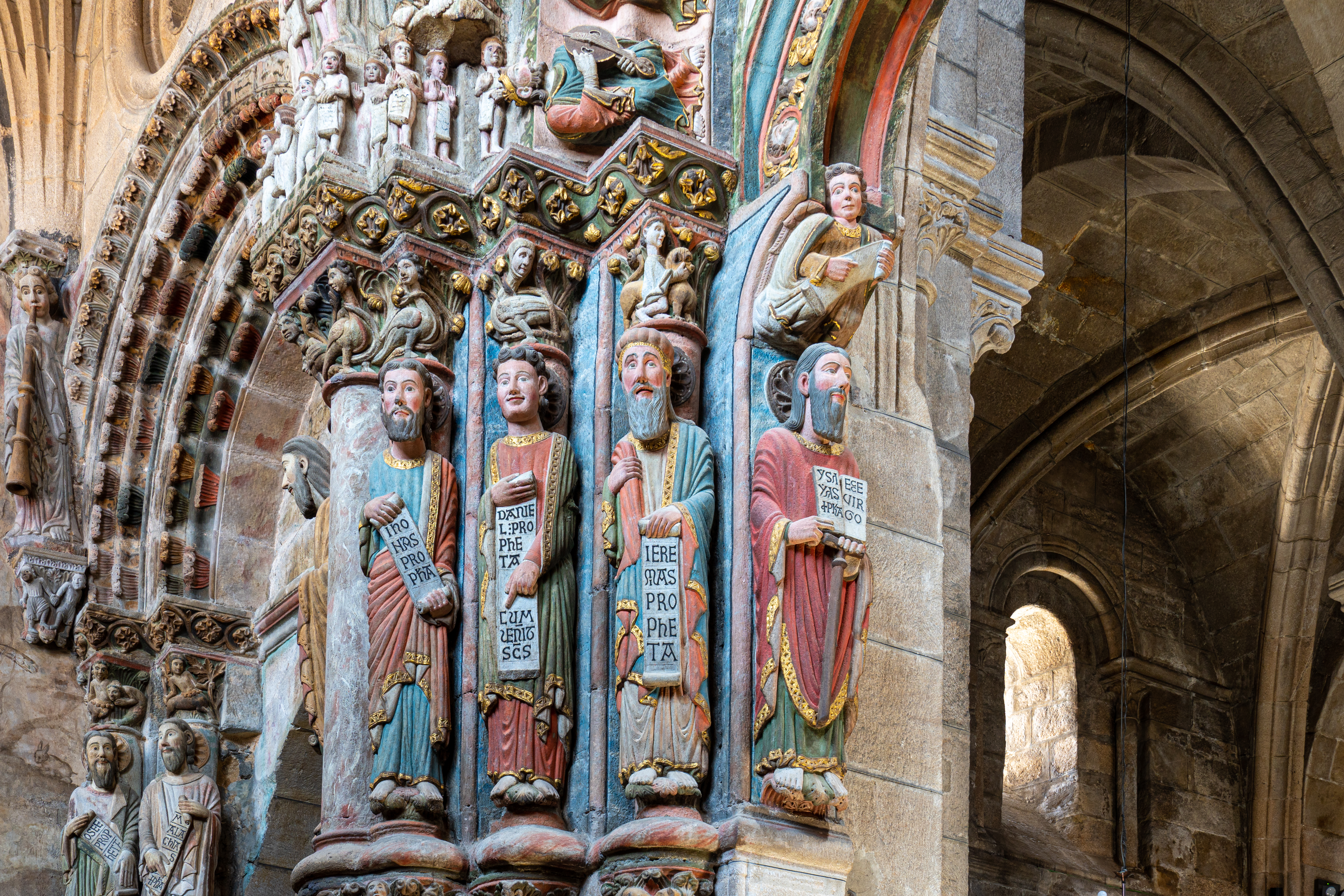
Portico of Paradise: coloured figures.

The 13th-century Portico of Paradise (Pórtico del Paraíso) was built by students of Master Mateo who is best known for his Pórtico de la Gloria in the Cathedral of Santiago de Compostela. Its three arches are supported by slender columns with a central mullion. The apostle St James or Santiago holds a sword reminiscent of his alleged miraculous participation in the legendary Battle of Clavijo. The original 13th-century figure was replaced in the 19th century. The statue of the Virgin of Consolation (Virgen del Consuelo) with the body of Christ which tops the mullion was also added in the 19th century. Other decorations include Christ being tempted by the devil, a medallion of God the Father and a tabernacle presenting St Martin tearing his cloak. The archivolts of the central arch bear the figures of the 24 elders from the Book of Revelation. The columns themselves are sculpted with apostles and prophets while the capitals present a variety of figures including Christ's temptations in the desert, centaurs fighting mermaids, dragons and harpies with frightening faces who were said to have brought the plague. The vividly coloured pilaster figures were restored in the 18th century from the original Romanesque polychrome. The two Baroque side chapels contain a Castro Canseco altarpiece of the Nursing Madonna and a representation of San Francisco Blanco from Ourense who was crucified in Japan in 1597.

== Tombs ==
The cathedral was the burial place for several individuals from the 13th to the 15th centuries in chapels of evolving Gothic design. The tomb of Bishop Vasco Pérez Mariño (died 1342) is in the northern transept; Bishop Lorenzo (died mid-12th century) is entombed in the nave of the epistle; Don Alonso González del Padrón is entombed next to the St Luke's chapel; the tomb of the Infantina, who may have been a Castilian princess, is next to the Capilla de las Nieves; two bishops, including Bishop Quevedo, are also entombed on the wall of the epistle.

== Museum ==
The cathedral museum is accessed through the Romanesque door leading to the Gothic cloisters known as Claustra Nova. Artifacts include El Incunable de Monterrey, the first book published in Galicia in 1494, Enrique de Arfe's processional cross, 13th-century enamels from Limoges, the so-called Treasure of San Rosendo and the oldest Christian tombstone in Galicia from Baños de Bande.

== See also ==
- Roman Catholic Diocese of Ourense
