= Primitivus =

Primitivus may refer to:

== Saints ==
- Saint Primitivus, Roman Christian martyr, son of Symphorosa, died in 138
- Saint Primitivus, Spanish Christian martyr, one of Facundus and Primitivus, died in 300

== Animals ==
- Primitivus (reptile), extinct genus of reptiles belonging to the family Dolichosauridae

== Software ==
- Text-based user interface in Linux software Libervia
