= Alfonso Pérez Noya =

Spanish Roman Catholic prelate

Most Reverend Alfonso Pérez Noya
- Bishop of Orense
- Church: Catholic Church
- Diocese: Diocese of Ourense
- In office: 1361–1366
- Predecessor: Gonzalo Núñez de Novoa
- Successor: Juan Sierra

Orders
- Consecration: February 1362 by Blas Fernández de Toledo

Personal details
- Died: 1366 Ourense, Italy

Alfonso Pérez Noya (died 1366) was a Roman Catholic prelate who served as Bishop of Ourense (1361–1366).

== Biography ==
On 23 August 1361, Alfonso Pérez Noya was appointed during the papacy of Pope Innocent VI as Bishop of Ourense. In February 1362, he was consecrated bishop by Blas Fernández de Toledo, Archbishop of Toledo. He served as Bishop of Orense until his death in 1366.

== External links and additional sources ==
- Cheney, David M. "Diocese of Orense". Catholic-Hierarchy.org. (for Chronology of Bishops) ^{[self-published]}
- Chow, Gabriel. "Diocese of Orense (Spain)". GCatholic.org. (for Chronology of Bishops) ^{[self-published]}

Catholic Church titles
Preceded by Gonzalo Núñez de Novoa	Bishop of Ourense; 1361–1366	Succeeded by Juan Sierra
