= Bérenger de Landore =

French Dominican and archbishop

Most Reverend Bérenger de Landore
- Archbishop of Santiago de Compostela
- Church: Catholic Church
- Archdiocese: Archdiocese of Santiago de Compostela
- In office: 1317-1330
- Successor: Gómez Manrique
- Previous post: Master of the Order of Preachers (1312–1317)

Orders
- Consecration: 30 April 1318 by Niccolò Alberti

Personal details
- Born: 1262 France
- Died: 20 October 1330 (age 68) Santiago de Compostela, Spain

Bérenger de Landore (also Berengar of Landorra, of Landorre; Berenguel de Landoria, Landória, or Landoira) (1262–1330) was a French Dominican, who became Master of the Order of Preachers (1312–1317), and then Archbishop of Santiago de Compostela (1317-1330). He was from a noble family of southern France.

== As Master General ==
As Master General, he set up the Friars Pilgrim missionaries. He set the trend towards Thomism as central to Dominican theology; and campaigned against that of Durandus of Saint-Pourçain. He asked Bernard Gui to compose a replacement for the Golden Legend of Jacobus de Voragine.

== As Archbishop ==
On 15 July 1317, he was appointed during the papacy of Pope John XXII as Archbishop of Santiago de Compostela. On 30 April 1318, he was consecrated bishop by Niccolò Alberti, Cardinal-Bishop of Ostia e Velletri. He took until 1322 to take possession as Archbishop, there being a Galician rival. He had to reside at some time at Noia, where he held a synod. His takeover was a violent affair. He served as Archbishop of Santiago de Compostela until his death on 20 Oct 1330. While bishop, he was the principal consecrator of Gonzalo Núñez de Novoa, Bishop of Orense (1320) and Rodrigo Ibáñez, Bishop of Lugo (1320). He is remembered also for the building work he initiated on the Cathedral of Santiago de Compostela, and relics. One of the cathedral towers bears his name.

== Works ==
His Lumen animæ, seu liber moralitatum Magnarum rerum naturalium was printed in 1482 by Matthias Farinator.

Catholic Church titles
Preceded by Aymericus Giliani	Master General of the Dominican Order; 1312–1317	Succeeded by Hervé de Nédellec
Preceded by Rodrigo del Padrón	Archbishop of Santiago de Compostela; 1317-1330	Succeeded by Gómez Manrique (bishop)
