= Gonzalo Núñez de Novoa =

Spanish Roman Catholic prelate

Most Reverend Gonzalo Núñez de Novoa
- Bishop of Orense
- Church: Catholic Church
- Diocese: Diocese of Orense
- In office: 1319–1332
- Successor: Alfonso Pérez Noya

Orders
- Consecration: 1320 by Berenguel Landore

Personal details
- Died: 16 May 1332 Ourense, Italy

Gonzalo Núñez de Novoa (died 16 May 1332) was a Roman Catholic prelate who served as Bishop of Orense (1319–1332).

== Biography ==
On 25 September 1319, Gonzalo Núñez de Novoa was appointed Bishop of Orense during the papacy of Pope John XXII. In 1320, he was consecrated bishop by Berenguel Landore, Archbishop of Santiago de Compostela with Pedro Méndez Sotomayor y Meiras, Bishop of Coria, and Pedro, Bishop of Salamanca, serving as co-consecrators. He served as Bishop of Orense until his death on 16 May 1332.

== External links and additional sources ==
- Cheney, David M. "Diocese of Orense". Catholic-Hierarchy.org. (for Chronology of Bishops) ^{[self-published]}
- Chow, Gabriel. "Diocese of Orense (Spain)". GCatholic.org. (for Chronology of Bishops) ^{[self-published]}

Catholic Church titles
Preceded by	Bishop of Orense; 1319–1332	Succeeded by Alfonso Pérez Noya
