= Gómez Manrique (bishop) =

Most Reverend Gómez Manrique
- Archbishop of Toledo
- Church: Catholic Church
- Archdiocese: Archdiocese of Toledo
- In office: 1370–1374
- Predecessor: Blas Fernández de Toledo
- Successor: Pedro Díaz de Tenorio
- Previous posts: Bishop of Tui (1348–1351); Archbishop of Santiago de Compostela (1351–1362)

Personal details
- Died: 19 December 1375 Toledo, Spain

Gómez Manrique (died 19 December 1375) was a Roman Catholic prelate who served as Archbishop of Toledo (1362–1375), Archbishop of Santiago de Compostela (1351–1362), and Bishop of Tui (1348–1351).

== Biography ==
On 18 August 1348, Gómez Manrique was appointed during the papacy of Pope Clement VI as Bishop of Tui. On 8 June 1351, he was appointed during the papacy of Pope Clement VI as Archbishop of Santiago de Compostela. On 2 May 1362, he was appointed during the papacy of Pope Innocent VI as Archbishop of Toledo. He served as Archbishop of Toledo until his death on 19 December 1375. While bishop, he was the principal consecrator of Juan Sierra, Bishop of Orense (1367).

== External links and additional sources ==
- Cheney, David M. "Archdiocese of Santiago de Compostela". Catholic-Hierarchy.org. (for Chronology of Bishops) ^{[self-published]}
- Chow, Gabriel. "Archdiocese of Santiago de Compostela (Spain)". GCatholic.org. (for Chronology of Bishops) ^{[self-published]}
- Cheney, David M. "Diocese of Tui-Vigo". Catholic-Hierarchy.org. (for Chronology of Bishops) ^{[self-published]}
- Chow, Gabriel. "Diocese of Tui-Vigo (Spain)". GCatholic.org. (for Chronology of Bishops) ^{[self-published]}
- Cheney, David M. "Archdiocese of Toledo". Catholic-Hierarchy.org. (for Chronology of Bishops) ^{[self-published]}
- Chow, Gabriel. "Metropolitan Archdiocese of Toledo (Spain)". GCatholic.org. (for Chronology of Bishops) ^{[self-published]}

Catholic Church titles
Preceded by Rodrigo Ibáñez	Bishop of Tui; 1348–1351	Succeeded by Juan de Cervantes
Preceded by Berenguel Landore	Archbishop of Santiago de Compostela; 1351–1362	Succeeded by Rodrigo de Luna
Preceded by Blas Fernández de Toledo	Archbishop of Toledo; 1362–1375	Succeeded by Pedro Díaz de Tenorio
