= Pedro Tenorio =

Pedro Tenorio may refer to:

- Pedro Tenorio (archbishop) (c.1328–1399), Spanish prelate
- Pedro Pangelinan Tenorio (1934–2018), Northern Mariana Islander politician
- Pedro Agulto Tenorio (born 1941), Northern Mariana Islander politician
- Pedro Tenorio Matanzo (1953–2021), Spanish poet
- Pedro Tenorio Lezama (born 1954), Mexican botanist

== See also ==
- Pedro Silva y Tenorio (died 1479), bishop of Lugo, Ourense and Badajoz
