= Laurentius Hispanus =

Laurentius Hispanus (died 15 December 1248), also known as Lorenzo Hispano or Lawrence of Spain, was a professor of canon law at the University of Bologna from c. 1205 to 1214 and the bishop of Ourense from 1218 until his death.

== Life ==
Laurentius was a native of the Iberian peninsula, probably either Galicia or Portugal. His date and place of birth are unknown. He may have been from Ourense, where he later returned as bishop. At Bologna, he studied civil law under Azo and canon law under Bernardo Compostelano. After graduating in both laws, he taught canon law at Bologna from about 1205, although he is certainly recorded there only in the years 1210–1214. Among his students were Tancred of Bologna, Geoffrey of Trani, Bartholomew of Brescia and perhaps Sinibaldo Fieschi (the future Pope Innocent IV).

From 1214 to 1218, Laurentius served as schoolmaster at Ourense Cathedral. In 1218, he was elected bishop and served in that capacity until his death. He attended the ecumenical First Council of Lyon in 1245. He acted as a mediator between Kings Ferdinand III of Castile and Sancho II of Portugal. He died on 15 December 1248.

== Works ==
Glossa Palatina (outer text)

Laurentius wrote in Latin. His works are often difficult to identify because they circulated anonymously. At least five works are securely attributed to him.

The Glossa Palatina is a collection of glosses on the entire Decretum Gratiani. It was written at Bologna before 1214. Laurentius also wrote extensive glosses on the De penitentia section of the Decretum. These were included in almost their entirety in the Glossa Ordinaria of Johannes Teutonicus. He wrote a series of glosses on the first three Compilationes antiquae. The first two are known from the Apparatus of Tancred. The third, Apparatus glossarum in Compilationem tertiam, has been edited by Brendand McManus.

A collection of notes by one of Laurentius' students is preserved in the Bibliothèque nationale de France, manusctip Latin 15393. The Distinctiones Decretorum has been attributed to him, but this is doubtful. He may also have written glosses on the fifth Compilatio and the canons of the Fourth Lateran Council.

Laurentius' major contribution to canon law was the incorporation of terminology from Roman law, which he "cited [...] more often and integrated [...] into the basis of his legal argumentation more regularly than previous canonists." He was first "to recognize that [...] the pope was free to abolish and change old law without [...] the need for consent" because of the evolution of canon law.

== Bibliography ==
- McManus, Brendan Joseph (1991). The Ecclesiology of Laurentius Hispanus (c. 1180–1248) and His Contribution to the Romanization of Canon Law Jurisprudence, with an Edition of the "Apparatus glossarum Laurentii Hispanii in Compilationem tertiam" (PhD dissertation). Syracuse University. ProQuest 9214385
- Pennington, Kenneth; et al. (2024). "Laurentius Hispanus". Bio-Bibliographical Guide to Medieval and Early Modern Jurists. Ames Foundation.
- Pérez Martín, Antonio (2018). "Lorenzo Hispano". Diccionario Biográfico Español. Real Academia de la Historia.
