= Juan Sierra =

Spanish Roman Catholic prelate

Most Reverend Juan Sierra
- Bishop of Segovia
- Church: Catholic Church
- Diocese: Diocesep of Segovia
- In office: 1370–1374
- Predecessor: Fernando Sarracín
- Successor: Hugo de Lamanhania
- Previous post: Bishop of Orense (1367–1370)

Orders
- Consecration: 1367 by Gómez Manrique (bishop)

Personal details
- Died: 16 February 1374 Segovia, Spain

Juan Sierra (died 16 February 1374) was a Roman Catholic prelate who served as Bishop of Segovia (1370–1374) and Bishop of Orense (1367–1370).

== Biography ==
On 23 August 1361, Juan Sierra was appointed during the papacy of Pope Innocent VI as Bishop of Orense. In 1367, he was consecrated bishop by Gómez Manrique (bishop), Archbishop of Toledo, with Bishop Gundisalvo, Bishop of Viseu, serving as co-consecrator. On 3 October 1370, he was appointed during the papacy of Pope Urban V as Bishop of Segovia. He served as Bishop of Segovia until his death On 16 February 1374.

== External links and additional sources ==
- Cheney, David M. "Diocese of Orense". Catholic-Hierarchy.org. (for Chronology of Bishops) ^{[self-published]}
- Chow, Gabriel. "Diocese of Orense (Spain)". GCatholic.org. (for Chronology of Bishops) ^{[self-published]}
- Cheney, David M. "Diocese of Segovia". Catholic-Hierarchy.org. (for Chronology of Bishops) ^{[self-published]}
- Chow, Gabriel. "Diocese of Segovia (Spain)". GCatholic.org. (for Chronology of Bishops) ^{[self-published]}

Catholic Church titles
Preceded by Alfonso Pérez Noya	Bishop of Orense; 1367–1370	Succeeded by Juan Gonzalez Fernandez de Illescas
Preceded by Fernando Sarracín	Diocesep of Segovia; 1370–1374	Succeeded by Hugo de Lamanhania
