= Prado Rúa =

Spanish social media influencer

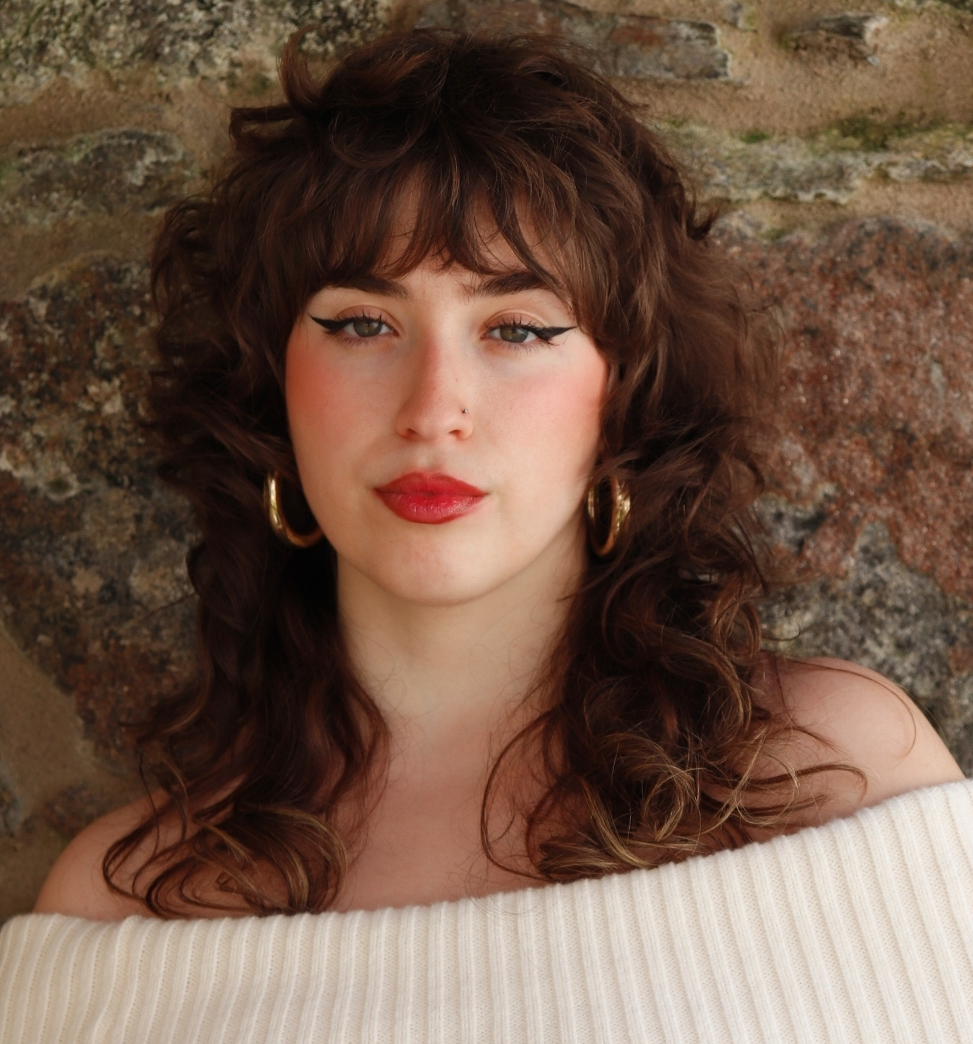
- Rodríguez in 2024
- Born: María Rúa Rodríguez; 2000 (age 25–26); Ourense, Galicia, Spain
- Education: University of Santiago de Compostela
- Occupation: Social media influencer

Instagram information
- Page: prado_rua
- Followers: 63 thousand

TikTok information
- Page: pradorua
- Years active: 2020–present
- Followers: 24 thousand
- Last updated: 28 August 2026

María Rúa Rodríguez (born 2000), known professionally as Prado Rúa, is a Spanish social media influencer. She is best known for her culture, humorous and lifestyle videos on Instagram and TikTok. According to La Región, she was named the "Best Creator in Galician" in 2024.
