= Ansurius =

Galician bishop, monk and saint

Saint Ansurius of Orense

Bishop of Orense, Venerable
- Born: 8th century
- Died: 925 AD
- Venerated in: Eastern Orthodox Church; Roman Catholic Church
- Feast: 26 January

Ansurius (died 925, also known as Aduri, Asurius, Isauri) was a Galician bishop. He became bishop of Orense in 915. In 922, he gave up his post to become a monk at the monastery he helped found, Ribas de Sil. He is venerated as a saint in the Eastern Orthodox Church and Roman Catholic church, being commemorated with a feast day on 26 January.
