= María do Ceo =

Portuguese fado singer

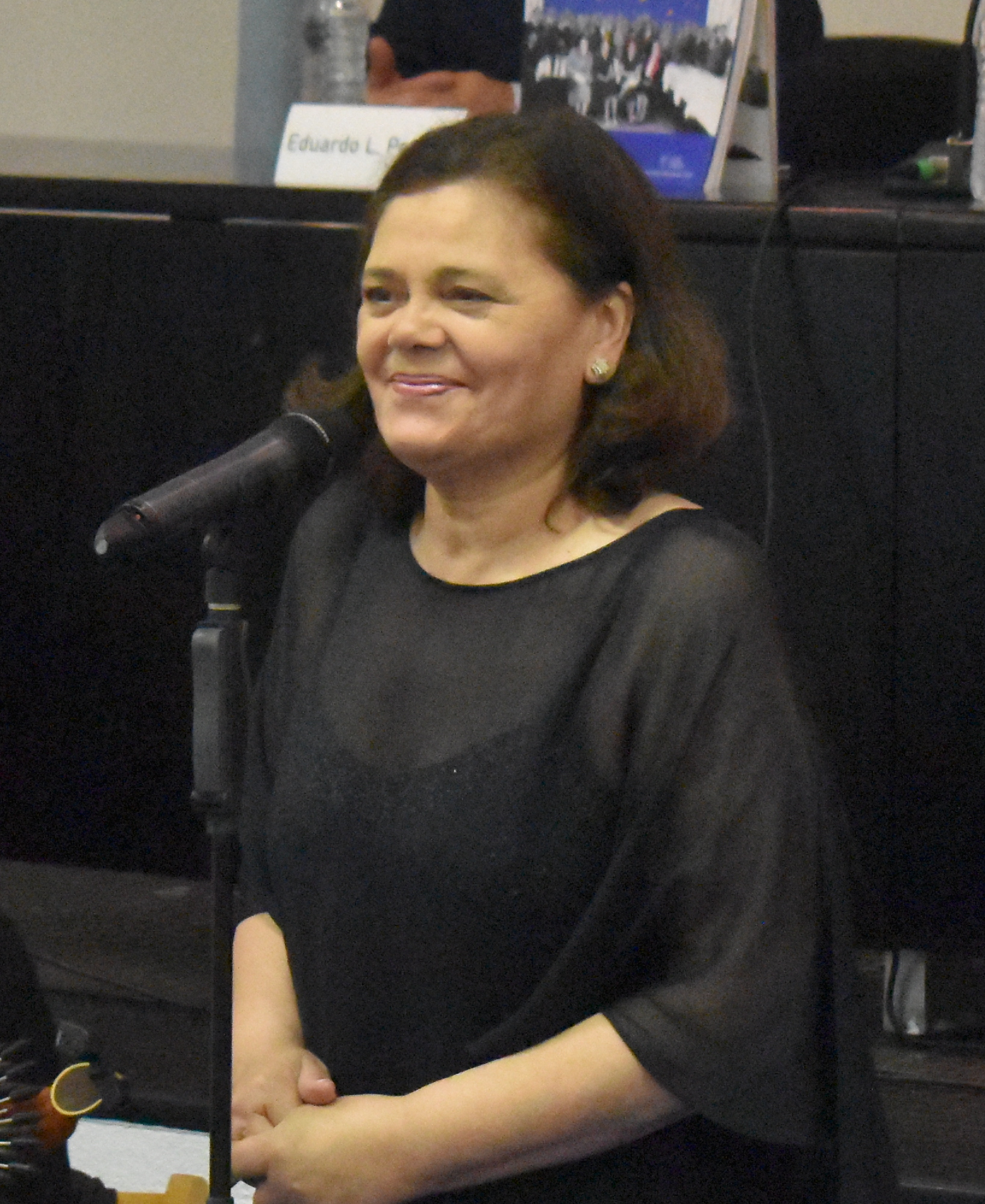

Background information
- Born: Porto, Portugal
- Genres: Fado; Bolero
- Occupation: Singer

María do Ceo is a Portuguese fado and bolero singer and composer who lives in Galicia, Spain.

== Early life ==
Do Ceo was born (1959 or 1960) in Porto in Portugal but when she was ten her family moved to the city of Ourense in the autonomous community of Galicia in northwestern Spain. She learnt about fado from her father who was an amateur fado singer at night and an industrial painter by day. However, she did not begin to perform in public until quite late because of her father's objections. In 1987, she started to sing part-time at cafés in Ourense, while working as a supermarket cashier, but within a year she was giving concerts at theatres throughout Galicia. She is married to the musician, José Salgado, and they have two sons, Alex and Raúl Salgado, both also musicians. Her family often accompanies her.

== Musical career ==
Her breakthrough came in the mid-1990s. In January 1996 she recorded a TVE programme and participated in a charity concert for UNICEF. That same year she took part in the Festival Interceltique de Lorient. In 1997 she formed the Galician-Portuguese group "Alfama" (named after a song by Amália Rodrigues about the part of Lisbon most famous for its fado restaurants) and began performing as a soloist with great success. Under the title of Cartas de Amor, her first album, including some classic fado songs, was released on CD in 1997. Do Ceo went on a concert tour to Frankfurt to present the album. In 1998 she sang for the Portuguese Nobel Prize in Literature winner José Saramago in Santiago de Compostela. In January 1999 she presented her second album, Vellas lembranzas (Old memories), a largely fado album in which she began to fuse Galician and Portuguese music, both her own and covers. In 2001 she was invited to participate in the first posthumous tribute to Amália Rodrigues at the Coliseu dos Recreios in Lisbon. That same year she also participated in a tribute to Carlos Cano at the Gran Teatro Falla in Cádiz and performed in Italy. Her album Al rescate del alma (To the rescue of the soul) was issued in 2002.

Although her repertoire is based on fado, Do Ceo also sings boleros. In 2004 she recorded a CD with the Real Banda de Gaitas as a gift for the Prince and Princess of Asturias and a CD, Ese niño bastante bastante, for the PAIDEIA Foundation, an organization that supports women in rural areas. She also participated in a concert against gender violence in Algeria, in the annual Galician awards ceremony at the Auditorio de Galicia in Santiago de Compostela, and performed Franz Schubert's Ave Maria to Pope John Paul II with the Royal Bagpipe Band of Ourense at the Vatican. In 2005 she recorded an album of Christmas songs from Galicia and in 2008 an album of fados in Galician. Also in 2008 she participated with the dancer María Nadal in a musical entitled Alen do Mar, which was based on emigration and the songs that have accompanied migrants. In 2010, she composed the soundtrack for the film Años Después. In 2011 she was in charge of composing the anthem of Couto Misto, a former independent microstate bordered by Spain and Portugal.

Performing has taken her to France, Germany, Italy Switzerland, Algeria, Egypt, Uruguay, Mexico and Argentina. She has performed in notable venues, such as the Sagrada Família in Barcelona, the Virxe da Barca sanctuary in Muxía, and the Alcázar of Seville.

== Discography ==
Do Ceo's records have been as follows:

- 1997: Cartas de amor (Love letters)
- 1999: Vellas lembranzas (Old memories)
- 2002: Al rescate del alma (To the rescue of the soul)
- 2004: Fados… e outas músicas (Fados... and other songs)
- 2005: Panxoliñas-Villancicos (Carols)
- 2006: Dúas almas do Miño (Two souls of Miño)
- 2007: Tan lonxe, ao longe (So far away, in the distance)
- 2008: No bico un cantar
- 2010: Celme encantado (Enchanted Celme)
- 2011: Fado com outro acento (Fado with another accent)
- 2014: Soños Cumpridos (Dreams fulfilled)
- 2016: Años Después (Years later)
- 2017: De Portugal a Galicia. Fado (From Portugal to Galicia. Fado)
- 2017: Canciones infantiles (Children's songs)
- 2019: A fadista (The fado singer)
- 2021: Vai de Roda (Go for a ride)
- 2023: Galicia Nai (Mother Galicia)
