= Adam (bishop of Ourense) =

Adam (Spanish: Adán) was the sixth bishop of the restored diocese of Ourense from 1169 until his death in either 1073 or 1074.

The letter written by the cathedral chapter of Ourense to the Archbishop of Braga to announce their election of Adam survives, providing a valuable record of his career prior to assuming the episcopate. The chapter commends him for his "honest ways" (honestas morum) and for his "expertise in letters" (non deest in peritia litterarum).

Adam had served as a royal chancellor in 1166–67 and was the prior of the cathedral in Ourense at the time of his elevation. In April 1173 an interdict was placed on the diocese of Ourense. The historian Enrique Flórez argued that Adam had probably defended the marriage of King Ferdinand II of León to the Infanta Urraca of Portugal, a marriage recently dissolved by the Papal legate Hyacinth. As the diocese of Ourense lay on the border between León and Portugal, and Adam had previously served in Ferdinand's chancery, Richard Fletcher agrees that the bishop's support of the match would be expected.

== See also ==
- Catholic Church in Spain
