= Pedro Seguin =

Spanish Catholic bishop

Pedro Seguin (Latin: Petrus Seguini) was the fifth bishop of the restored diocese of Ourense from 1157 until his death in 1169. He possibly hailed from Poitou or perhaps the Poitevin colony in El Bierzo.

Pedro is probably the magister (teacher) associated with the cathedral of Santiago de Compostela from about the same time. He was on good terms with the kings during his episcopate: Alfonso VII "rejoiced" to learn of his election and Ferdinand II may have employed him as a confessor.
