= Rodrigo Ibáñez =

Spanish Roman Catholic prelate

Most Reverend Rodrigo Ibáñez
- Bishop of Tui
- Church: Catholic Church
- Diocese: Diocese of Tui
- In office: 1326–1335
- Predecessor: Bernardo Guido
- Successor: Gómez Manrique (bishop)
- Previous post: Bishop of Lugo (1319–1320)

Orders
- Consecration: 4 May 1320 by Berenguel Landore

Personal details
- Died: 1 March 1335 Tui, Pontevedra Spain

Rodrigo Ibáñez (died 1 March 1335) was a Roman Catholic prelate who served as Bishop of Tui (1326–1335) and Bishop of Lugo (1319–1320).

== Biography ==
On 25 September 1319 Rodrigo Ibáñez was appointed by the King of Spain and confirmed by John XXII as Bishop of Lugo. On 4 May 1320, he was consecrated bishop by Berenguel Landore, Archbishop of Santiago de Compostela with Pedro Méndez Sotomayor y Meiras, Bishop of Coria, and Diego Fernandi, Bishop of Zamora, as co-consecrators. On 3 September 1326, he was appointed by John XXII as Bishop of Tui. He served as Bishop of Tui until his death on 1 March 1335.

== See also ==
- Catholic Church in Spain

== External links and additional sources ==
- Cheney, David M. "Diocese of Lugo". Catholic-Hierarchy.org. (for Chronology of Bishops) ^{[self-published]}
- Chow, Gabriel. "Diocese of Lugo (Spain)". GCatholic.org. (for Chronology of Bishops) ^{[self-published]}
- Cheney, David M. "Diocese of Tui-Vigo". Catholic-Hierarchy.org. (for Chronology of Bishops) ^{[self-published]}
- Chow, Gabriel. "Diocese of Tui-Vigo (Spain)". GCatholic.org. (for Chronology of Bishops) ^{[self-published]}

Catholic Church titles
Preceded by Arias Medín	Bishop of Lugo; 1319–1320	Succeeded by Pedro López de Aguiar
Preceded by Bernardo Guido	Bishop of Tui; 1326–1335	Succeeded by Gómez Manrique (bishop)
