= Aymeric of Piacenza =

Italian Dominican scholar

Aymeric of Piacenza (born Piacenza, Italy; died 19 August 1327, Bologna) was an Italian Dominican scholar, who became Master of the Order of Preachers. He was involved in both the suppression of the Fraticelli, and the downfall of the Templars.

== Biography ==
Aymeric was born at Piacenza, Italy. Soon after his entrance into the Lombard province of the Dominican Order, he was sent (1262) to pursue his studies at Milan, where he formed a close friendship with Niccolò Boccasini, later pope under the name of Benedict XI (1303–04). After teaching philosophy and theology for twenty-four years he was elected Provincial of Greece. In this capacity he travelled to the Chapter General of Toulouse in May, 1304, where a successor to Bernard de Jusix was to be elected, but just before the first session renounced his office and vote, with the consent of the pope. That this act of humility was the cause of his election to the master generalship of the order is the unanimous verdict of all its chroniclers. His first care was to regulate studies in those provinces where the opposition of the Fraticelli to intellectual pursuits had been most felt. He definitely determined the qualifications for degrees in the order. Semitic languages were no less encouraged by him than natural sciences. In 1309 Pope Clement IV enjoined on Aymeric who was on his way to the chapter of Zaragoza in Spain, to examine into the charges brought against the Templars. He found little to complain of. In 1310 he was summoned to the Council of Vienne to take part in the process of the Templars. In the meantime, however, he resigned his office, and thus avoided the displeasure of Clement IV, whose policy he never heartily endorsed. At the same time, as he candidly avowed, he was saved from acting against the dictates of his conscience. Amymeric died at Bologna on 19 August 1327

== Works ==
Aymeric of Piacenza is the reputed author of a treatise against the heretics of his day, and of works on moral, dogmatic, and scholastic questions, none of which are known to be extant. Bernard de Montfaucon (Diarium Italicum, xxvii) speaks of a curious present given by Aymeric to the convent of Bologna. It was the Pentateuch in Hebrew and learned Jews of the time declared that the manuscript had been written by Ezra. “Although this smacks of the fabulous”, cautiously remarks Montfaucon “... still it cannot be denied that the codex appears to have been old when given to Aymeric”. As a man of letters Aymeric was in close touch with the learned men of his time. Pietro de' Crescenzi of Bologna completed his “De Re Rustica” at the repeated solicitations of Aymeric, by whom it was corrected before the author presented it to Charles II of Naples. The letters of Aymeric are found in “Litterae Encyclicae Magistrorum Generalium Ord. Praed.” (Ed. Reichert, Rome, 1900), which forms the fifth volume of the “Monumenta Hist. Fratr. Praed.” (181-202).

Catholic Church titles
Preceded by Bernard de Jusix	Master General of the Dominican Order; 1304–1311	Succeeded by Béranger de Landore
