= As Burgas =

Hot springs in Galicia, Spain

Coordinates: 42.3347°N 7.8650°W

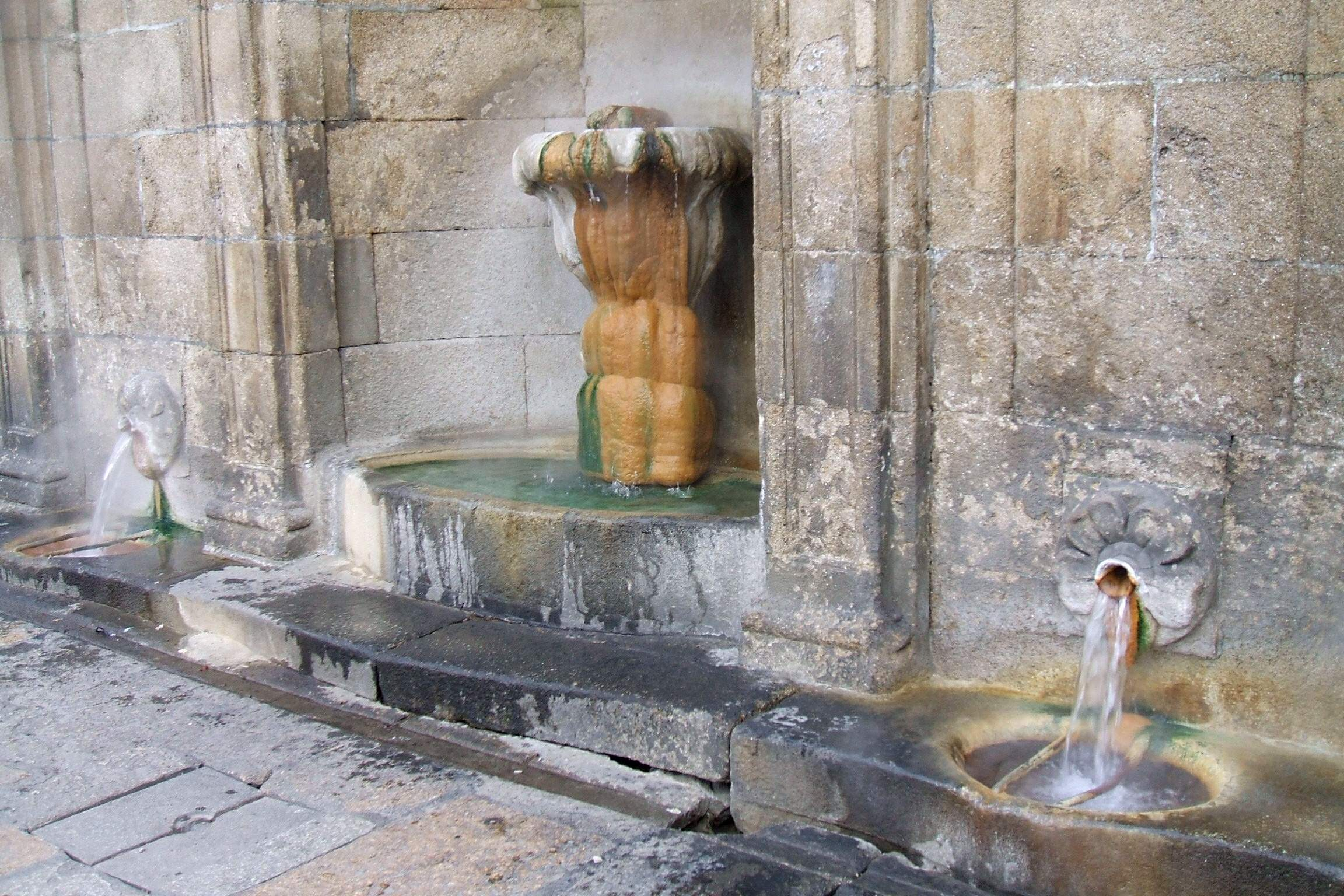
Principal fountain of Burga de Abaixo

As Burgas are hot springs in the historic center of Ourense, in Galicia, Spain. They include Burga do Medio, which is infused with gas, Burga de Arriba and a Burga de Abaixo. The waters are similar to those of Carlsbad (Czech Republic), and gush from granite rock to the west of the town at almost the boiling point. The hot mineral waters gush at 80 imp gal/min (6,100 ml/s).

== Thermal pool ==
On July 28, 2010, the new thermal pool was inaugurated in Burga do Medio, designed by Galician architect César Portela.
