= Diego (bishop of Ourense) =

Spanish Catholic bishop

Diego (died 1132) was the third bishop of the restored diocese of Ourense from between 1097 and 1100 until his death. He was a canon of the Cathedral of Santiago de Compostela and a protégé of its bishop, Diego Gelmírez, with whom he remained in close association even after his promotion to his own see. In 1118–19, according to the Historia Compostellana, he served Gelmírez as an ambassador to the Papal curia. Like his patron, he also supported Queen Urraca during her war against her husband, Alfonso the Battler.
