= Libervia =

XMPP client

Libervia (formerly Salut à toi)
- Initial release: 2008
- Stable release: 0.8.0 / 30 November 2021
- Written in: Python
- Operating system: Unix, Android
- Type: instant messenger, microblog, XMPP client
- Licence: AGPL-3.0-or-later
- Website: libervia.org

Libervia (formerly Salut à Toi or SàT) is a multifunctional communications application and decentralized social network published under the AGPL-3.0-or-later license.

Initially made for instant messaging and chat, Libervia developed additional functionality that can be used for microblogging, blogging, filesharing, audio and video streaming, and gaming. It has Atom feeds, and both WYSIWYM and WYSIWYG editors.

It uses XMPP. It also implemented ActivityPub in beta in late 2022, with a gateway that allows the two protocols to intercommunicate, aiming to have it in alpha in early 2023.

== Architecture ==
Libervia uses a client-server architecture. The client consists of a backend daemon (which can be installed locally or on a server) and one of several frontends. Frontends include:

- jp, a command-line interface
- Cagou, a frontend for desktops and mobile phones
- Libervia-web (formerly Libervia), a web interface
- Primitivus, a text-based user interface

Third-party frontends include:

- Wix, WxWidgets-based desktop GUI (now deprecated)
- Bellaciao, Qt-based graphical user interface (development on hold)
- Sententia, an Emacs frontend (development is currently stalled)
