= Ponte Vella =

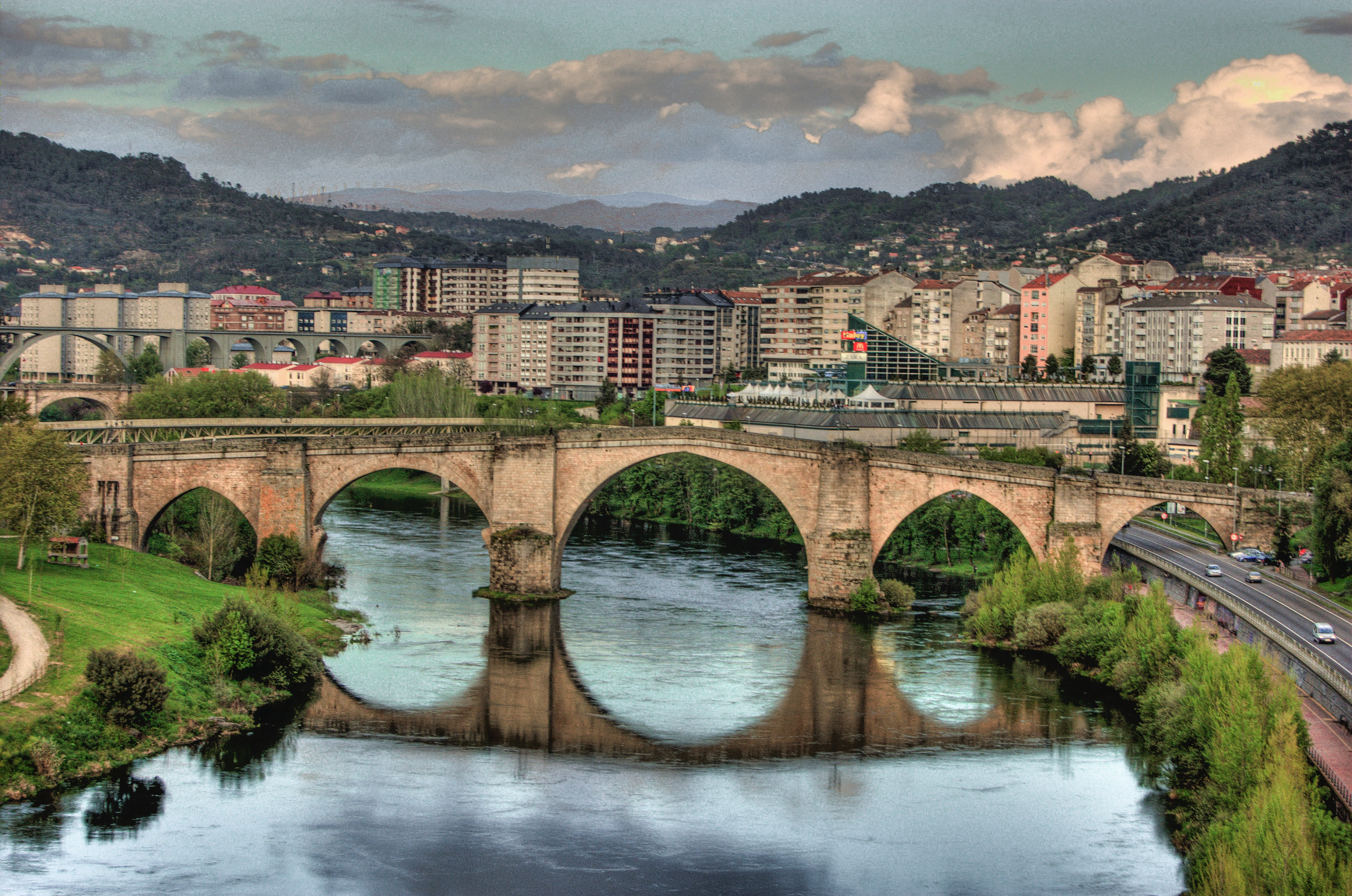
- Ponte Vella
- Coordinates: 42°20′43″N 7°52′7″W
- Carries: Accessible to pedestrians only
- Crosses: Minho River
- Locale: Ourense, Galicia, Spain
- Official name: Ponte Vella
- Other name(s): Ponte Romana; Ponte Maior

Characteristics
- Design: Arch bridge
- Total length: 373 metres (1,224 ft)
- Longest span: 43 metres (141 ft)
- Clearance below: 38 metres (125 ft)

History
- Opened: 1230

Ponte Vella (Galician, "old bridge", Ponte Romana (Roman bridge), Ponte Maior (great bridge)) is a medieval footbridge built on Roman foundations in Ourense, Spain. Located at the intersection of N120 and Rua Progreso, it spans the Minho River. Its steep rise of 135 feet (41 m) above the Minho River makes for safe passage during flash floods. At one time, it was considered to be the biggest bridge in all of Spain.

== Geography ==
The bridge is situated in front of a chapel, connecting Ourense and Santiago de Compostela. The Ponte Maior was the only access across the Minho River until another bridge was constructed in 1816, while Ponte Milenio, a modern bridge, was built later in the millennium.

== History ==
The original bridge across the Minho River was built during the first century rule of Emperor Augustus though other sources state that it was built during the Trajan period. A mention is made of this bridge in the will of Doña Urraca, where it is said that it was repaired with funds provided by Ferdinand III. From the Middle Ages, it has provided access to the city of Ourense for trade and pilgrimage. The structure was rebuilt in 1230 by Bishop Lorenzo on Roman foundations (original piers), and repaired in 1449 by Bishop Pedro de Silva. It then measured 1,319 feet (402 m) long, with an arch span of 156 feet (48 m). However, the main arch collapsed in 1499 and the bridge was rebuilt in 1679 to a length of 370 metres (1,210 ft) with seven arched spans, the main span measuring 43 metres (141 ft). The height of the bridge above the water level is 38 metres (125 ft).

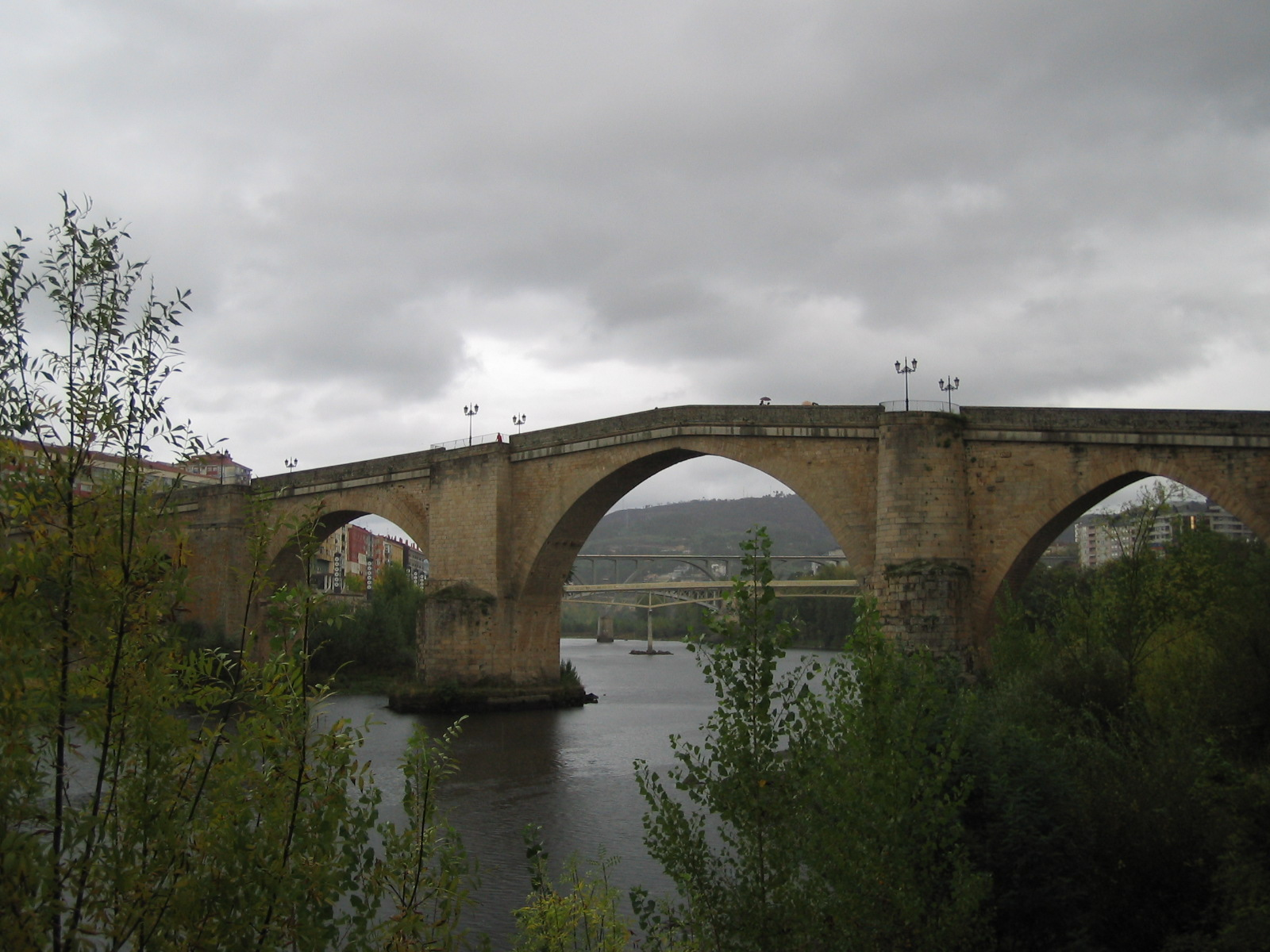

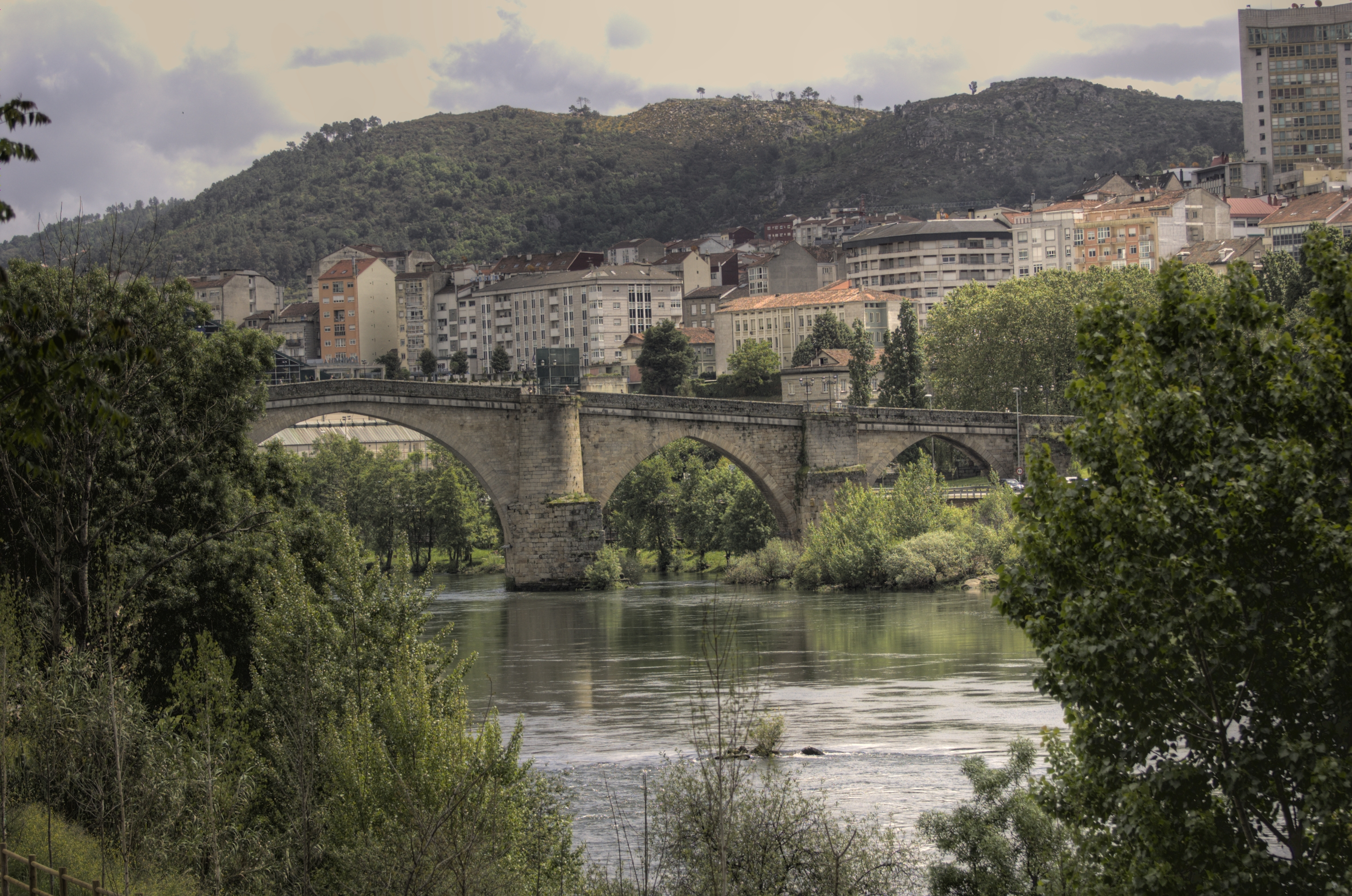

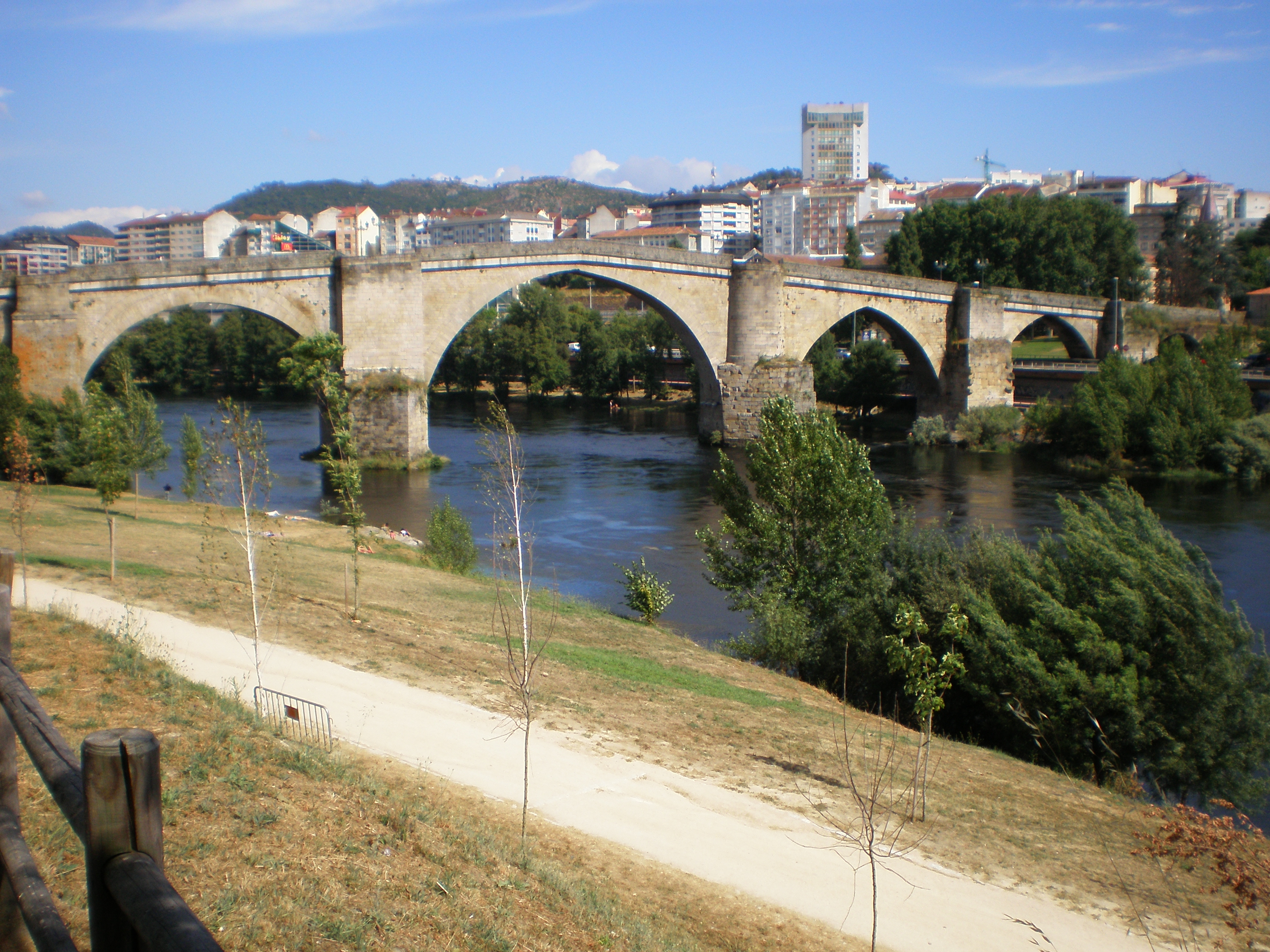

== See also ==
- List of Roman bridges
- Roman architecture
- Roman engineering
