= Pedro Silva y Tenorio =

Spanish Roman Catholic prelate

Most Reverend Pedro Silva y Tenorio
- Bishop of Badajoz
- Church: Catholic Church
- Diocese: Diocese of Badajoz
- In office: 1461–1479
- Successor: Giovanni d'Aragona
- Previous posts: Bishop of Lugo (1445–1447); Bishop of Ourense (1447–1461)

Personal details
- Died: 20 January 1479 Badajoz, Spain

Pedro Silva y Tenorio, O.P. (died 1479) was a Roman Catholic prelate who served as Bishop of Badajoz (1461-1479), Bishop of Ourense (1447-1461), and Bishop of Lugo (1445-1447).

== Biography ==
Pedro Silva y Tenorio was ordained a priest in the Order of Preachers. In 1445, he was appointed by Pope Eugene IV as Bishop of Lugo. In 1447, he was appointed by Pope Nicholas V as Bishop of Ourense. On 19 October 1461, he was appointed by Pope Pius II as Bishop of Badajoz. He served as Bishop of Badajoz until his death on 20 January 1479.

== External links and additional sources ==
- Cheney, David M. "Diocese of Lugo". Catholic-Hierarchy.org. (for Chronology of Bishops) ^{[self-published]}
- Chow, Gabriel. "Diocese of Lugo (Spain)". GCatholic.org. (for Chronology of Bishops) ^{[self-published]}
- Cheney, David M. "Diocese of Orense". Catholic-Hierarchy.org. (for Chronology of Bishops) ^{[self-published]}
- Chow, Gabriel. "Diocese of Orense (Spain)". GCatholic.org. (for Chronology of Bishops) ^{[self-published]}

Catholic Church titles
Preceded by García Martínez de Baamonde	Bishop of Lugo; 1445–1447	Succeeded by García Martínez de Baamonde
Preceded by Juan de Torquemada	Bishop of Ourense; 1447–1461	Succeeded by Juan de Torquemada
Preceded by	Bishop of Badajoz; 1461–1469	Succeeded by Giovanni d’Aragona
