= Facundus and Primitivus =

Christian saints

Saints Facundus and Primitivus
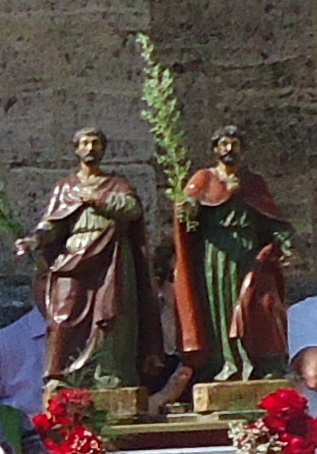
- Facundus and Primitivus; Procession statues in Las Quintanillas, Spain

Martyrs
- Born: León, Spain
- Died: 300 AD near present-day Sahagún, Spain
- Venerated in: Roman Catholic Church, Eastern Orthodox Church
- Feast: 27 November

Saints Facundus (Spanish: Facundo) and Primitivus (Spanish: Primitivo) are venerated as Christian martyrs. According to tradition, they were Christian natives of León who were tortured and then beheaded on the banks of the River Cea. According to an account of their martyrdom, after the two saints were beheaded, lac et sanguis (“milk and blood”) gushed from their necks.

== Veneration ==
The town of Sahagún arose around the Benedictine monastery dedicated to the two saints. The name Sahagún putatively derives from an abbreviation and variation on the name San Fagun ("Saint Facundus").

The 12th century work known as The Guide for the Pilgrim to Santiago de Compostela states: Item, visitanda sunt corpora beatorum martirum Facundi scilitet et Primitivi, quorum basilicam Karolus fecit (“Furthermore, the bodies of Facundus and Primitivus must be visited, whose basilica was constructed by Charlemagne.”).
