= Ourense =

City in southern Galicia, Spain

Ourense Orense
- Municipality
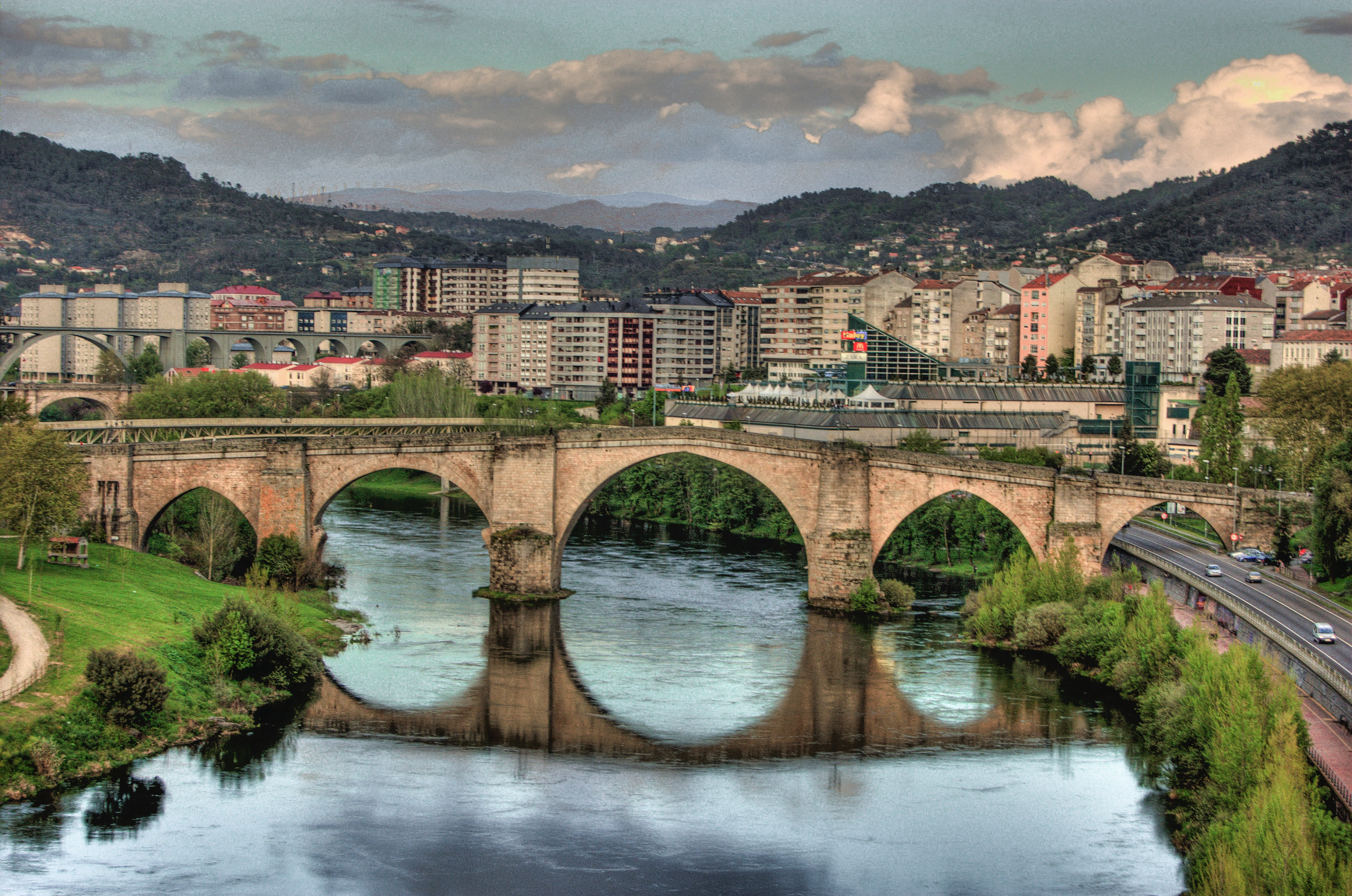
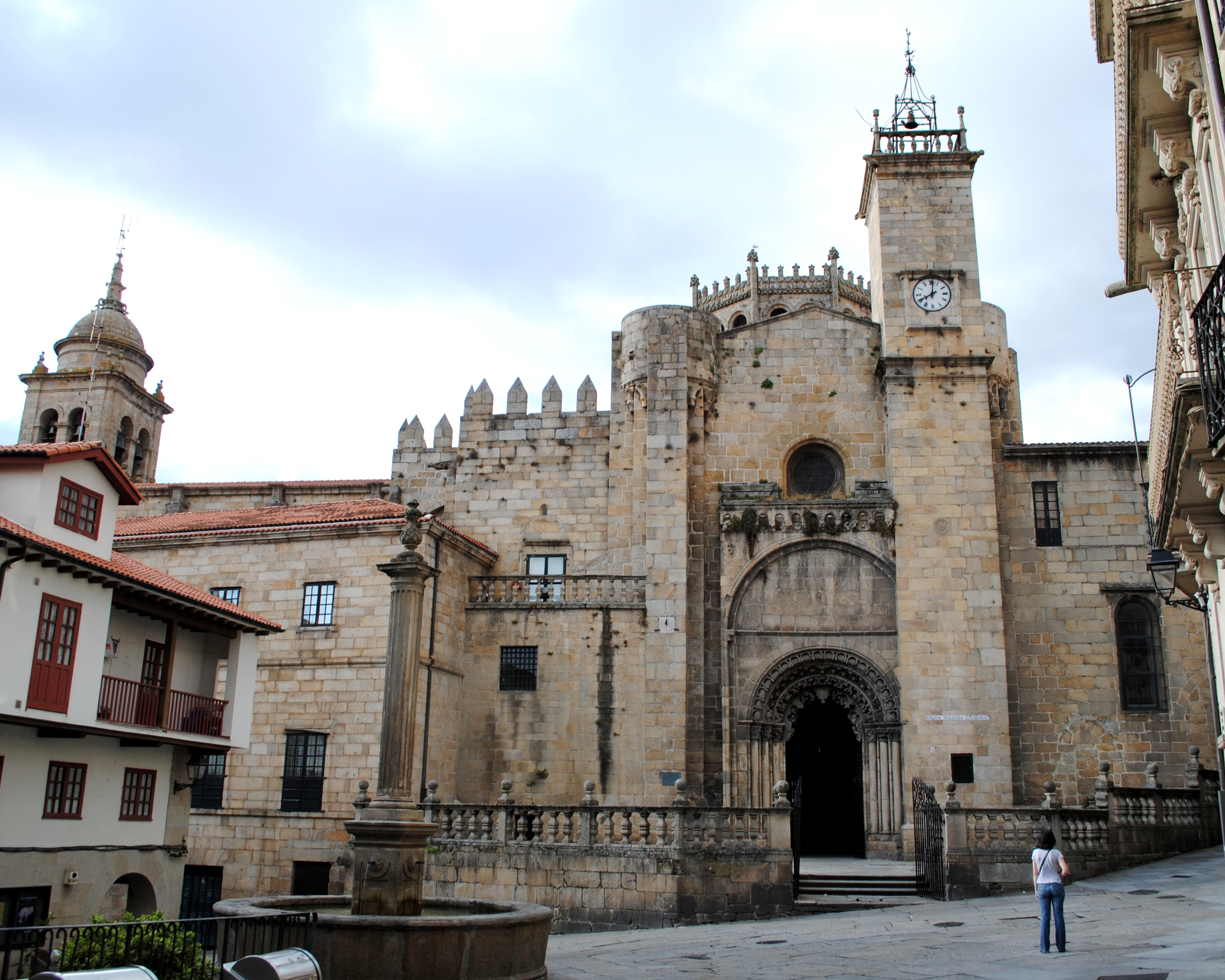
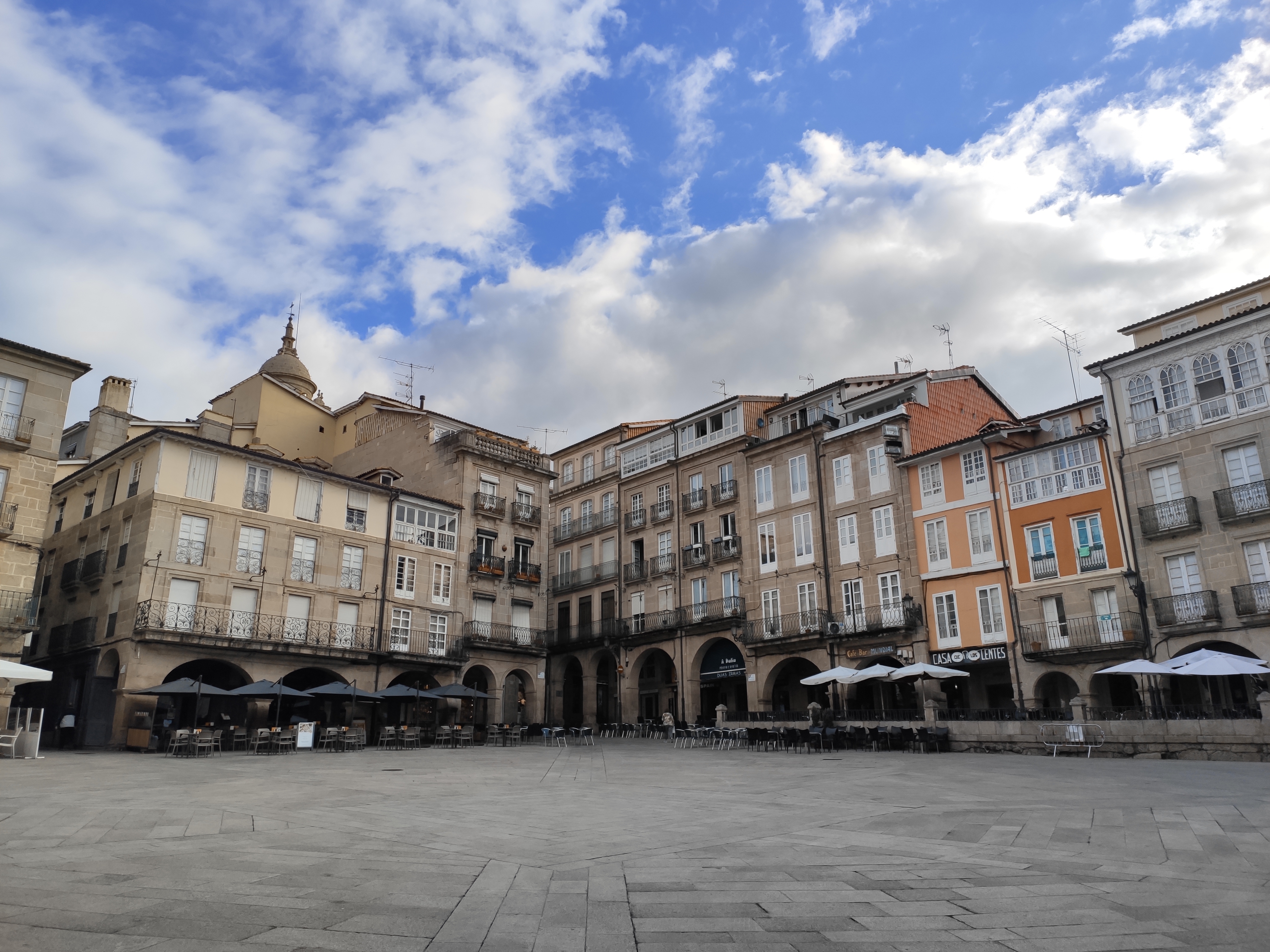
- Ponte Vella over the Miño river Cathedral Plaza Mayor

- Flag Coat of arms
- Nickname: A Cidade das Burgas (The City of As Burgas)
- Location of Ourense
- Coordinates: 42°20′11″N 7°51′48″W
- Country: Spain
- Autonomous Community: Galicia
- Province: Ourense
- Comarca: Ourense

Government
  - Type: Ayuntamiento
  - Body: Concello de Ourense
  - Mayor: Gonzalo Pérez Jácome (DO)

Area
  - Total: 84.5 km^{2} (32.6 sq mi)
- Elevation: 132 m (433 ft)

Population (2025-01-01)
  - Total: 105,769
  - Density: 1,250/km^{2} (3,240/sq mi)
- Demonym(s): ourensán/ourensao (m), ourensá (f) ourensano (m), ourensana (f)
- Time zone: CET (GMT +1)
  - Summer (DST): CEST (GMT +2)
- Postcode: 32001 - 32005
- Area code: +34 988
- ISO 3166-2: ES-OU
- Website: www.ourense.es

Ourense (Galician: [owˈɾɛnsɪ]); Spanish: Orense ([oˈɾense]) is a city and the capital of the province of Ourense, located in the autonomous community of Galicia, northwestern Spain. It is on the Camino Sanabrés path of the Way of St James (Camino de Santiago), and is crossed by the Miño, Barbaña, Loña and Barbañica rivers. It is also known as A cidade das Burgas (in Galician) due to its hot springs, being one of the European cities with the greatest thermal heritage.

== Population ==
Historical population
Year	Pop.	±%
1842	5,490	—
1857	11,012	+100.6%
1877	13,353	+21.3%
1887	14,440	+8.1%
1900	15,248	+5.6%
1910	16,285	+6.8%
1920	18,365	+12.8%
1930	21,461	+16.9%
1940	27,535	+28.3%
1950	55,030	+99.9%
1960	62,381	+13.4%
1970	73,145	+17.3%
1981	94,346	+29.0%
1991	102,758	+8.9%
2001	107,510	+4.6%
2011	107,314	−0.2%
2021	104,578	−2.5%
Source: National Statistics Institute

Its population of 105,769 (2025) accounts for 34% of the population of the province of Ourense and makes it the third largest city of Galicia. Its province has a population of 305,000.

In 2019 there were 14,171 foreigners living in the city, representing 13.5% of the total population. The main nationalities are Portuguese (31.8%), Venezuelans (11.2%) and Romanians (7.9%).

By language, according to 2018 data, 32.3% of the population always speak in Galician, 17.1% always speak in Spanish and the rest use both interchangeably.

== History ==
The origin of the town can be traced to the Romans and the presence of hot springs called the Burgas. These can still be seen today. There was also the need to fortify the place to protect one of the easiest ways to cross the Miño River. After the Romans, Ourense was part of the Kingdom of the Suebi during most of the 5th, 6th and 7th centuries and was destroyed by the Moors in 716. It was later rebuilt by Alfonso III of Asturias about 877. The Norse invasions as well as attacks from the Arab warlord Al-Mansur once more laid the city to waste. It was only under Sancho II and his sister Doña Elvira that the city was resettled during the 11th century. The definitive urban impulse did not arrive until the 12th century when Ourense became an important center of services. Recently the city has made many efforts to provide new parks, bridges, fountains and geothermal springs installations to make the city more attractive.

In the Middle Ages, there was a Jewish community in Ourense, until the 1492 expulsion of the Jews.

== Geography and geothermal springs ==
The ancient city of Auria is located on both banks of the Miño river in the south-central part of Galicia, at an elevation of 128 meters above sea level.

Four rivers cross the town: Miño (the main river), Barbaña, Loña and Barbañica. The biggest river divides a rather industrial western suburb, which contains the railroad station, from the main town. Three highway and one railroad bridge cross the river in addition to the famous Roman bridge, Ponte Vella, which is now closed to vehicle traffic. The town is surrounded by forests, mainly oak and pine.

One of the main tourist attractions is related to hot springs, as Ourense holds one of the greatest amount of geothermal water in Europe, becoming one of the six founding cities of the European Association of Historic Thermal Cities in 2009. It is estimated that three million liters of hot springs flow every day throughout the province. There are several places called pozas, burgas (galician terms) or termas (shared term between galician and spanish), with or without entrance fee, where you can have a bath outdoors. One of them (As Burgas) is located inside the old town centre, relating to the ancient Roman tradition, as ruins of a Roman bath were discovered and are now open to visitors.

There are more hot springs located along the river Miño:

- Termas da Chavasqueira are located near the fire station and the main entrance to the city, surrounded by green areas and the Miño river. Its waters flow at 63 °C and are bicarbonated, fluorinated, and sulfurized with medium mineralization.
- Fonte do Tinteiro is a manual traction fountain that expels low-mineralized, alkaline, sulphurous, fluorinated and mesothermal waters, located just 500 meters from the A Chavasqueira thermal area, at a 43 °C temperature.
- Pozas do Muíño da Veiga are located 3 km from the city, next to an old renovated mill. The space has a large main hot spring of 200m2, a second of 130 m2 and two others of 55 and 45 meters respectively. Its waters flow at a temperature between 65 °C and 72 °C. As for its composition, they are low-mineralized, fluorinated, silicated and alkaline waters.
- Pozas de Outariz are near the Pozas do Muíño da Veiga, 4 km from the city, and have two different parts separated by a pedestrian bridge that connects the OU-402 road with the enclosure: at the top are the Pozas de Outariz hot springs and at the bottom the Burgas de Canedo ones. The waters of this enclosure are low-mineralized, fluorinated, silicated and bicarbonated. The temperature at which these waters flow is 60 °C.

== Climate ==
Ourense has a hot-summer mediterranean climate (Köppen climate classification: Csa). Summers have hot daytime temperatures around 30 °C (86 °F), while winters are wet with daytime highs at 12 °C (54 °F) and lows a few degrees above freezing. On August 3, 2018, Ourense recorded its then hottest day on record at 42.7 °C (108.9 °F); this was beaten on 14 July 2022 when it reached 44.1 °C (111.4 °F). It is a microclimate generated by the unique orography of Ourense, affected by the Miño river valley, since the climate of Galicia is generally considered transitional oceanic or warm-summer mediterranean climate (Köppen climate classification: Csb).

Climate data for Ourense (1991–2020 normals)
Month	Jan	Feb	Mar	Apr	May	Jun	Jul	Aug	Sep	Oct	Nov	Dec	Year
Record high °C (°F)	22.0 (71.6)	25.5 (77.9)	30.6 (87.1)	32.9 (91.2)	37.7 (99.9)	40.9 (105.6)	44.1 (111.4)	42.2 (108.0)	41.2 (106.2)	34.9 (94.8)	26.3 (79.3)	22.4 (72.3)	44.1 (111.4)
Mean daily maximum °C (°F)	13.0 (55.4)	15.5 (59.9)	19.0 (66.2)	20.6 (69.1)	24.0 (75.2)	27.8 (82.0)	30.8 (87.4)	31.1 (88.0)	27.8 (82.0)	22.1 (71.8)	16.0 (60.8)	13.1 (55.6)	21.8 (71.2)
Daily mean °C (°F)	8.4 (47.1)	9.4 (48.9)	12.1 (53.8)	13.9 (57.0)	16.9 (62.4)	20.5 (68.9)	22.9 (73.2)	22.9 (73.2)	20.2 (68.4)	16.0 (60.8)	11.3 (52.3)	8.7 (47.7)	15.3 (59.5)
Mean daily minimum °C (°F)	3.7 (38.7)	3.3 (37.9)	5.3 (41.5)	7.1 (44.8)	9.8 (49.6)	13.1 (55.6)	15.1 (59.2)	14.8 (58.6)	12.6 (54.7)	9.9 (49.8)	6.5 (43.7)	4.3 (39.7)	8.8 (47.8)
Record low °C (°F)	−7.0 (19.4)	−6.6 (20.1)	−6.8 (19.8)	−3.2 (26.2)	−0.4 (31.3)	2.4 (36.3)	6.4 (43.5)	5.6 (42.1)	3.0 (37.4)	−2.0 (28.4)	−6.8 (19.8)	−8.6 (16.5)	−8.6 (16.5)
Average precipitation mm (inches)	99.5 (3.92)	63.6 (2.50)	75.8 (2.98)	76.8 (3.02)	63.9 (2.52)	34.9 (1.37)	17.6 (0.69)	21.9 (0.86)	56.1 (2.21)	119.2 (4.69)	111.9 (4.41)	108.3 (4.26)	849.5 (33.43)
Average precipitation days (≥ 1 mm)	11.0	8.7	9.5	11.4	9.3	4.9	2.7	3.2	6.6	10.8	11.9	11.2	101.2
Mean monthly sunshine hours	101	130	181	198	228	260	292	277	216	151	98	86	2,218
Source: Météo Climat

Climate data for Ourense (1981–2010 normals)
Month	Jan	Feb	Mar	Apr	May	Jun	Jul	Aug	Sep	Oct	Nov	Dec	Year
Record high °C (°F)	22.0 (71.6)	25.5 (77.9)	30.6 (87.1)	32.9 (91.2)	37.6 (99.7)	40.9 (105.6)	43.3 (109.9)	42.2 (108.0)	41.2 (106.2)	34.9 (94.8)	26.3 (79.3)	22.4 (72.3)	43.3 (109.9)
Mean daily maximum °C (°F)	12.7 (54.9)	15.1 (59.2)	18.7 (65.7)	19.8 (67.6)	22.9 (73.2)	27.5 (81.5)	30.2 (86.4)	30.6 (87.1)	27.5 (81.5)	21.7 (71.1)	15.9 (60.6)	12.8 (55.0)	21.3 (70.3)
Daily mean °C (°F)	8.0 (46.4)	9.2 (48.6)	11.9 (53.4)	13.3 (55.9)	16.2 (61.2)	20.2 (68.4)	22.5 (72.5)	22.6 (72.7)	19.9 (67.8)	15.6 (60.1)	11.1 (52.0)	8.5 (47.3)	14.9 (58.8)
Mean daily minimum °C (°F)	3.4 (38.1)	3.2 (37.8)	5.0 (41.0)	6.7 (44.1)	9.5 (49.1)	12.8 (55.0)	14.8 (58.6)	14.5 (58.1)	12.3 (54.1)	9.6 (49.3)	6.3 (43.3)	4.1 (39.4)	8.5 (47.3)
Record low °C (°F)	−7.0 (19.4)	−6.6 (20.1)	−6.8 (19.8)	−3.2 (26.2)	−0.4 (31.3)	2.4 (36.3)	6.4 (43.5)	5.6 (42.1)	3.0 (37.4)	−2.0 (28.4)	−6.8 (19.8)	−8.6 (16.5)	−8.6 (16.5)
Average precipitation mm (inches)	89 (3.5)	66 (2.6)	59 (2.3)	72 (2.8)	64 (2.5)	36 (1.4)	20 (0.8)	22 (0.9)	57 (2.2)	112 (4.4)	103 (4.1)	112 (4.4)	811 (31.9)
Average precipitation days (≥ 1 mm)	10.2	8.6	8.4	11.1	9.5	4.6	2.9	3.3	5.8	10.4	10.5	11.2	96.9
Average snowy days	0.6	0.2	0.1	0	0	0	0	0	0	0	0	0.2	1.1
Average relative humidity (%)	81	74	68	67	66	62	59	60	65	75	82	84	70
Mean monthly sunshine hours	87	115	166	180	205	249	278	268	204	138	84	70	2,054
Source: Agencia Estatal de Meteorología

== Economy ==
The economy of the city of Ourense is marked by a predominance of service sector provision. The city has the largest shopping and leisure in the province, and administrative services (Xunta delegation, central and provincial government offices), educational (a campus of the University of Vigo) and health services (Ourense Hospital Complex). The construction industry is also important. Copasa, one of the biggest Galician construction companies, has its headquarters in the city.

The industrial area of San Cibrao das Viñas has many light industries including several important clothing factories, like Adolfo Dominguez and Roberto Verino, as well as automotive supplier industries.

Ourense is a well known producer of European chestnuts (Castanea sativa). Coren, one of the Spanish agricultural sector's most important companies, has its headquarters in Ourense.

== Sights ==
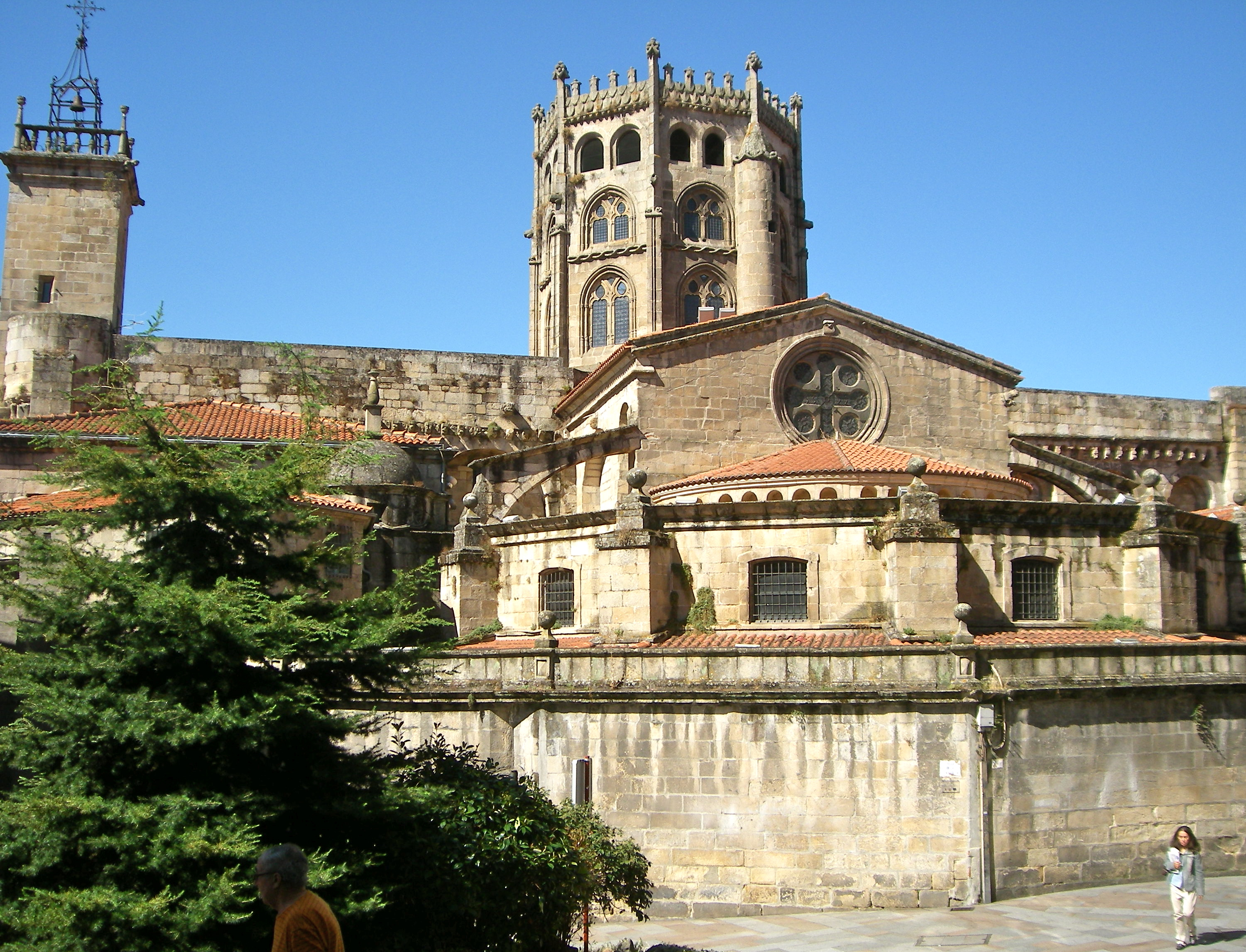
Ourense Cathedral.

Although mainly a town of services, Ourense is not without its tourist sites. The town has three parts: the medieval, the area of 19th-century expansion, and the modern perimeter. Many who pass by on the highway linking Madrid to Vigo are unaware of the medieval quarter, with its narrow streets and tiny plazas. Once an area of a certain dilapidated charm the area is now undergoing renovation and is full of typical restaurants and bars patronized by the university students of the town. The Plaza Mayor is the center of city life with its arcaded shops and the Town Hall.

The Cathedral is the most important monument in Ourense. This cathedral (founded 572; rebuilt in the 13th century) is the second oldest in Galicia. It occupies the same site as the Suevian basilica that stood there in earlier times. Romanesque in structure, but with a mixture of Romanesque and Gothic styles, it is rather hidden away but, contains a façade with the Door of Paradise in imitation of the Door of Glory of the Cathedral of Santiago de Compostela. Inside, the Capilla del Cristo, or Christ's Chapel (16th century), contains a crucifix venerated throughout Galicia.

The Miño is crossed at Ourense by the Ponte Vella (Old Bridge). With Roman foundations, it was reconstructed by Bishop Lorenzo in 1230 but frequently repaired since then; it has seven arches and a central span of 141 feet (43 m).

La Ruta de la Plata (the silver route in English) and the Portuguese Way, different routes on the Camino de Santiago, both pass directly through Ourense. La Ruta de la Plata, the longest of all the Camino's routes, begins in Sevilla and moves north through the west of the country. The pilgrims on both routes are important to Ourense's tourism industry, especially in holy years of St. James when traffic on the Camino is especially high.

== Politics ==
Municipal elections
Party/List	1979	1983	1987	1991	1995	1999	2003	2007	2011	2015	2019
AP / PP	5	11	11	12	14	14	14	13	11	10	7
BN-PG / BNG	2	-	-	2	6	7	7	6	3	-	2
PSdeG-PSOE	5	10	10	10	7	6	6	8	11	6	9
DO									2	8	7
Citizens											2
Ourense in Common										3	
CG / CPG		4	-								
IDEGA			3								
UCD / CDS	9										
PCG / EU	2	-	-	-	-	-	-	-	-		
Independents	2										
Total	25	25	27	27	27	27	27	27	27	27	27

== Transport ==
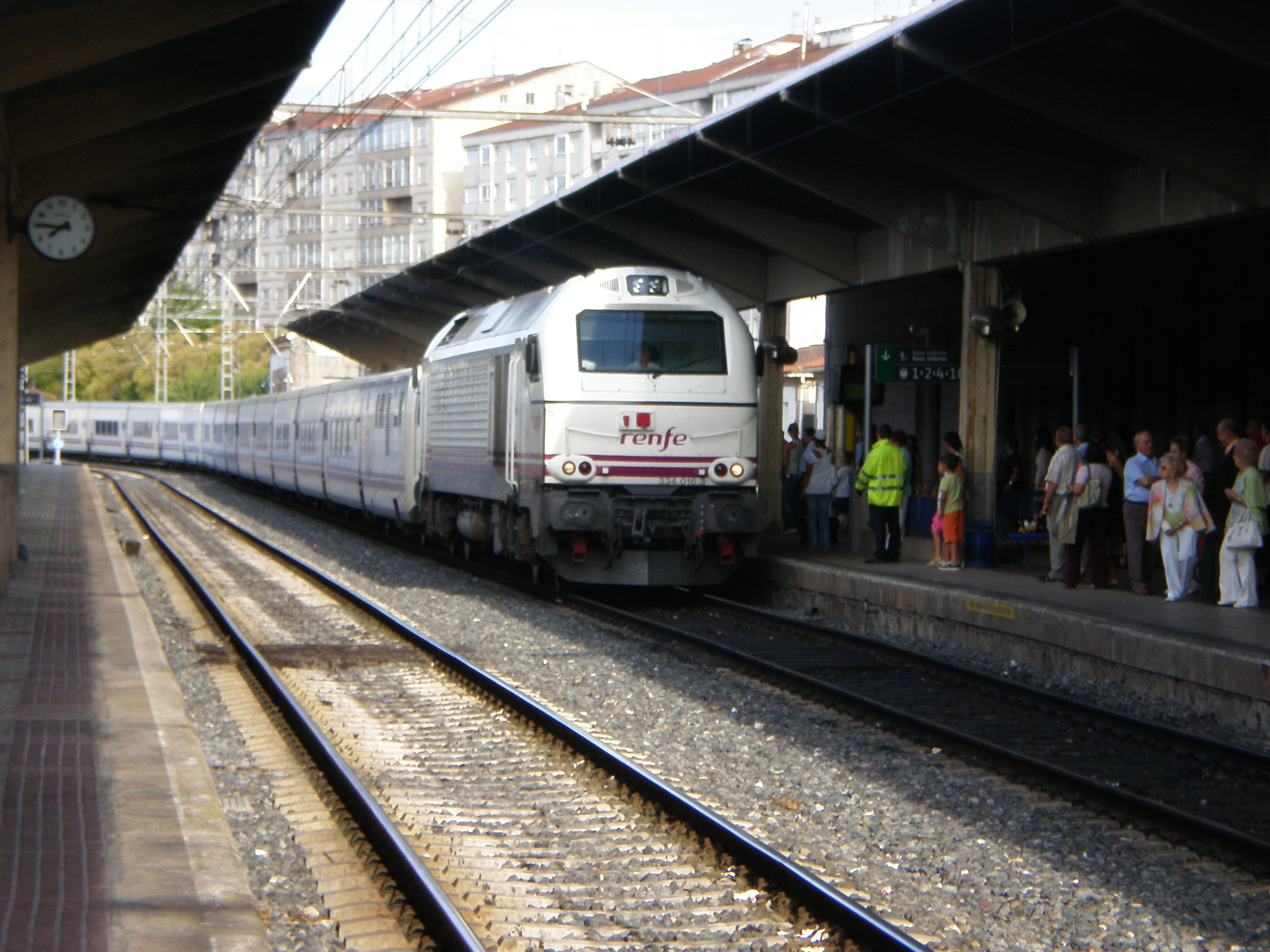
Talgo in Ourense-Empalme railway station

The city is served by the Ourense Railway Station.

== Barallete ==
Barallete was the name of an argot employed by the traditional knife-sharpeners and umbrella makers (afiadores e paragüeiros) of Ourense. It was based on the Galician language as spoken in Ourense, but its users substituted everyday words with invented ones of no linguistic connection, making it impossible for other people to understand it.

== Sport ==
The town has a long but turbulent history of association football. UD Orensana was founded in 1935 after a merger of two local clubs. It was dissolved in 1952 and CD Ourense was founded in its place. They fell into financial trouble in 2014 and were dissolved. Ponte Ourense Club de Fútbol, founded in 1977, changed its name in 2014 to Ourense CF.

== Notable residents ==
- Rebeca Baceiredo (born 1979), philosopher and essayist
- Clara Corral Aller (1847-1908), poet
- Filomena Dato (1856-1926), feminist, writer
- José Luis Abadín (born 1986), racing driver
- Antonia Ferrín Moreiras (1914–2009), mathematician, professor, and the first Galician woman astronomer, was born in Ourense.
- María do Ceo, fado singer
- Prado Rúa, social media influencer

== International relations ==
=== Twin towns – sister cities ===
Ourense is twinned with:

- Plaza de la Revolución (Havana), Cuba
- Quimper, France
- Tlalnepantla de Baz, Mexico
- Vila Real, Portugal

== Images ==
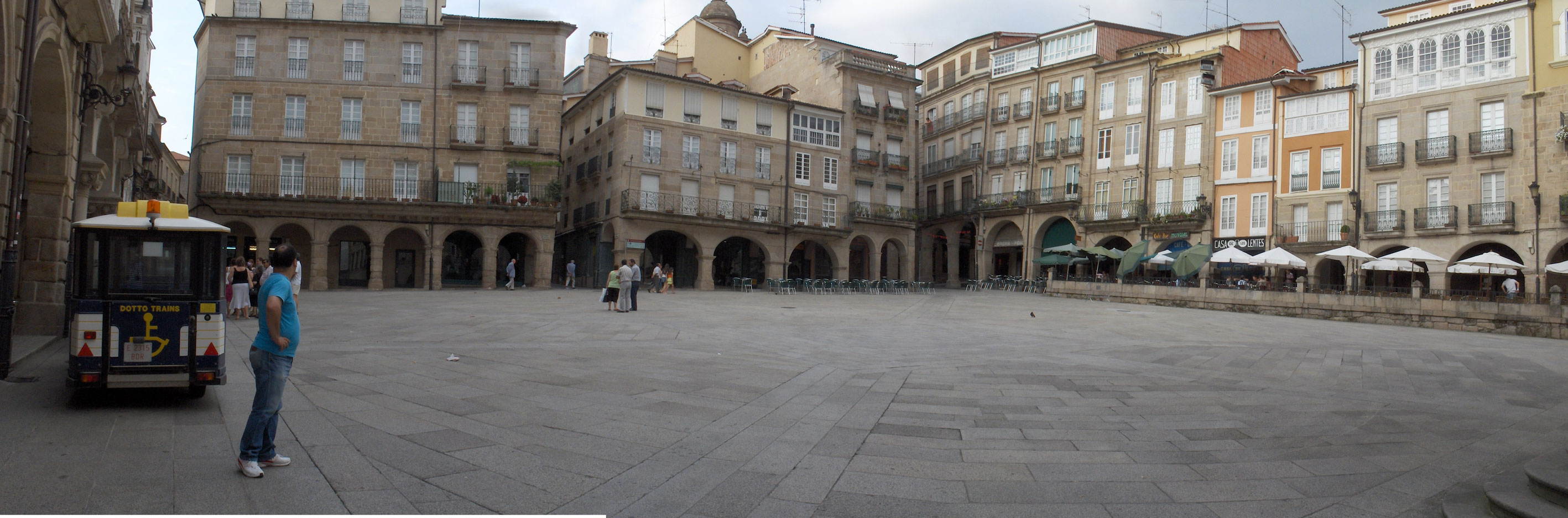
Main square

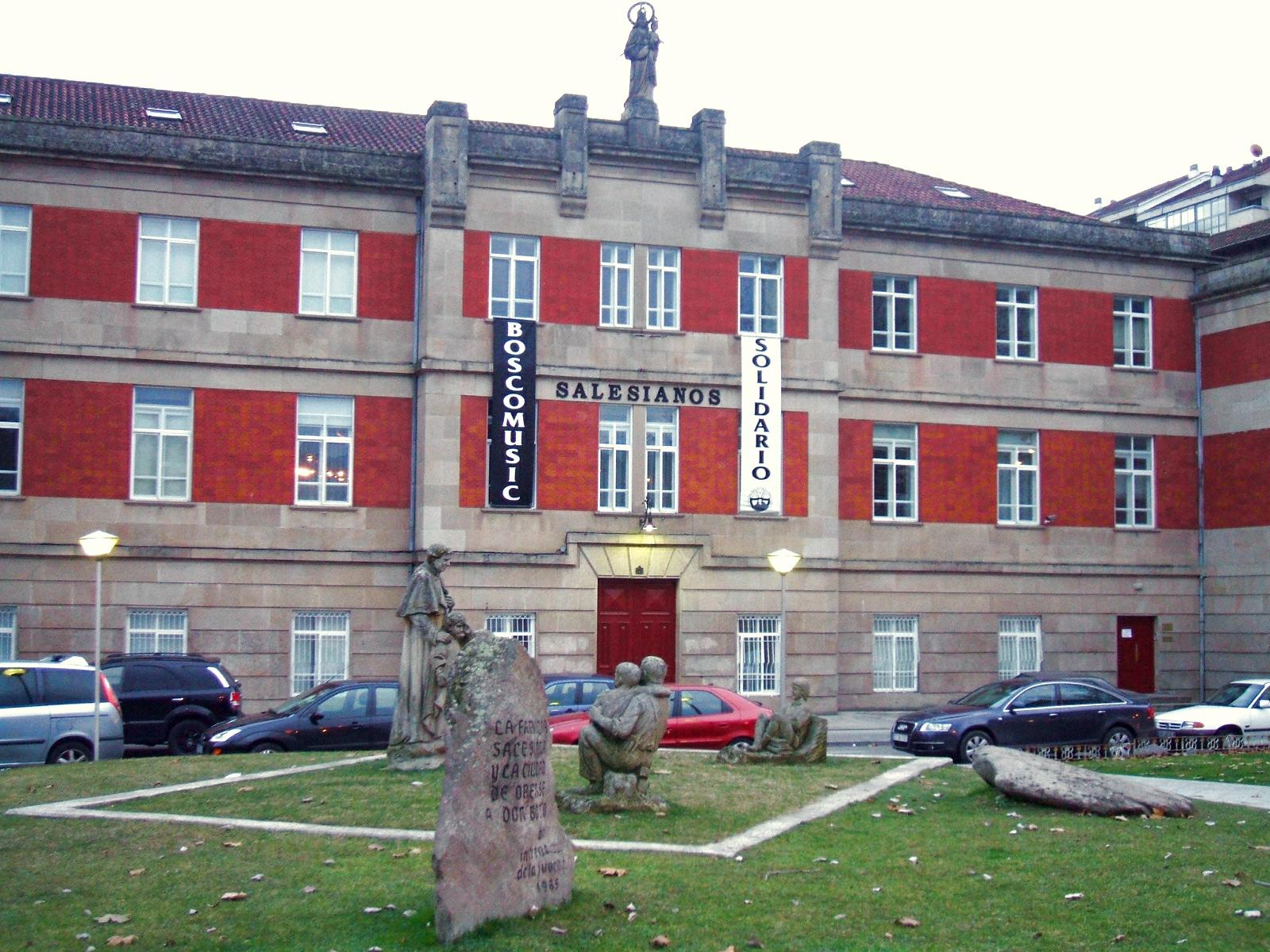
María Auxiliadora Collegiate Church
