= List of mayors of Vigo =

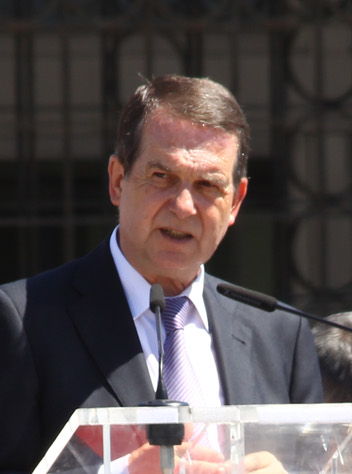
Abel Caballero is the current and longest serving mayor

This is a list of the mayors of Vigo, Spain, since the Spanish Civil War.

== Since the Spanish Civil War ==
- 1938–1939: Luís Suárez Llanos-Menacho
- 1939–1940: Estanislao Durán Gómez
- 1940–1949: Luís Suárez Llanos-Menacho
- 1949–1960: Tomás Pérez-Lorente
- 1960–1963: Salvador de Ponte y Conde de la Peña
- 1963: Alberto Varela Grandal
- 1963–1964: José Ramón Fontán Gonzalez
- 1964–1970: Jesús Portanet Suárez
- 1970–1974: Antonio Bernardino Ramilo Fernández-Areal
- 1974–1978: Joaquín García Picher
- 1978–1979: Emma González Bermello

== Since democratic elections in 1979 ==
- 1979–1991: Manoel Soto – PSdeG-PSOE
- 1991–1995: Carlos Alberto González Príncipe – PSdeG-PSOE
- 1995–1999: Manuel Pérez Álvarez – PPdeG
- 1999–2003: Lois Pérez Castrillo – BNG
- 2003: Ventura Pérez Mariño – PSdeG-PSOE
- 2003–2007: Corina Porro Martínez – PPdeG
- 2007–: Abel Caballero – PSdeG-PSOE

== Bibliography ==
- Os alcaldes e os concellos de Vigo, Vigo, Instituto de Estudios Vigueses, 1991, ISBN 84-606-0075-0
- Historia ilustrada de Vigo, 1996, ISBN 84-87657-99-0
