= Pedro Tenorio (bishop) =

Archbishop of Toledo

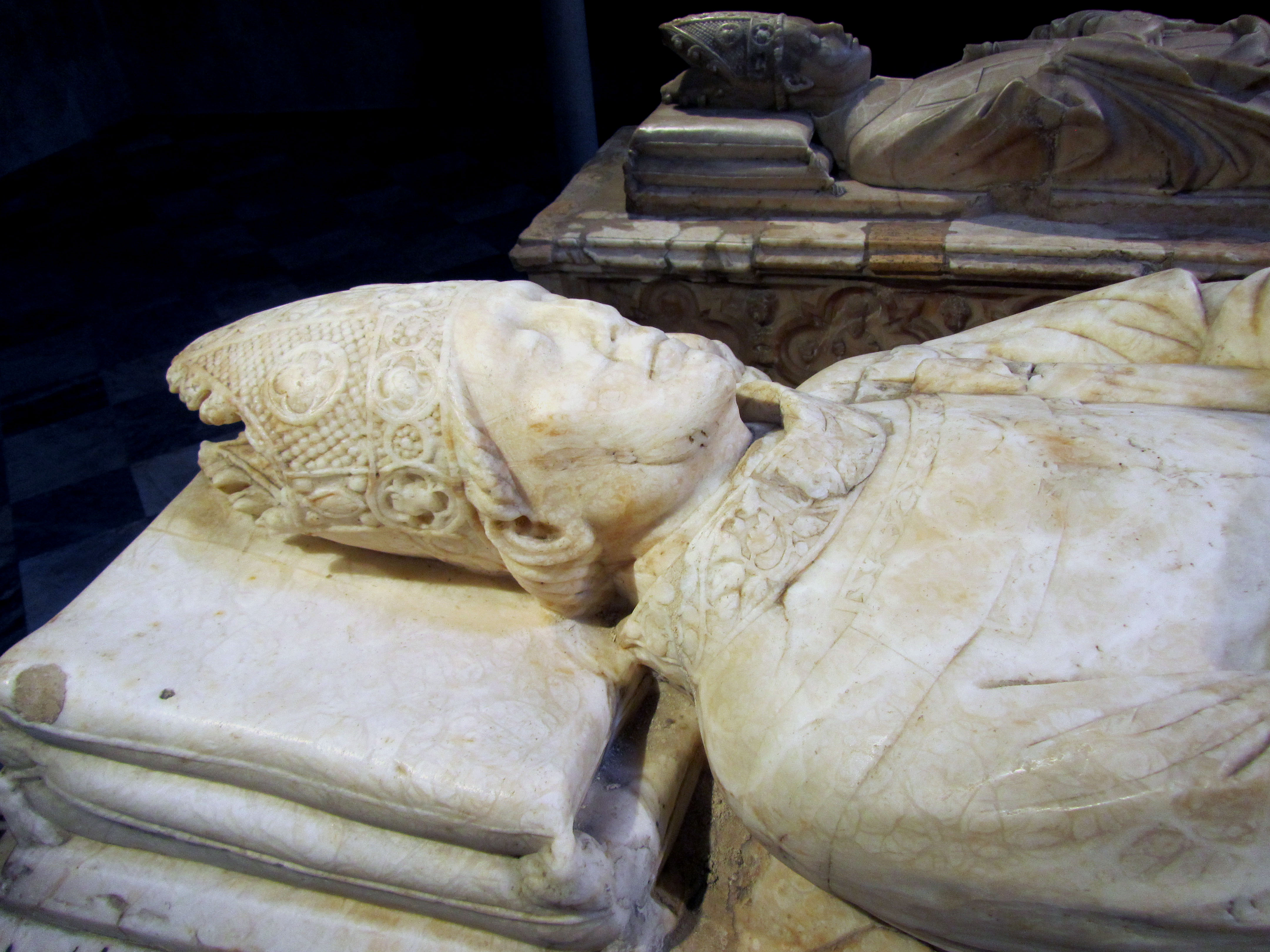
Detail of the sarcophagus of Pedro Tenorio in the cathedral

Pedro Tenorio (c. 1328 – 18/28 May 1399), sometimes called Pedro Díaz de Tenorio, was the bishop of Coimbra from 1371 to 1377 and archbishop of Toledo from 1377 until his death. Pedro was educated in exile in France and Italy. He fought in the Castilian Civil War in 1367 and obtained a doctorate in canon law in 1368. In the Western Schism, he argued the conciliarist position. He played a leading role in the regency of Henry III in 1391–1393. He is remembered primarily as an administrator and builder whose legacy is bridges, towns, churches, hospitals and castles. According to the Diccionario biográfico español, he was "one of the great archbishops of Toledo".

== Early life and education ==
Pedro was the son of Diego Alfonso Tenorio, whose ancestors came from Pontevedra, and Juana Duque of Talavera de la Reina. He was born around 1328 either in Toledo or in Talavera. He had two brothers, Juan and Mendo. His first recorded ecclesiastical office was the archdeaconry of Toro, where he successfully sued his predecessor, Diego Arias Maldonado, for mismanaging the benefice.

When King Peter the Cruel came to power, Pedro and his brothers fled to France with a large quantity of silver and gold. The archdeaconry was taken from him and bestowed on a son of Mateos Ferrández de Cáceres, a close associate of the king. A canonry in Toledo was offered him, but he could not take it up. Juan died in papal Avignon, while Mendo was lured back with a false safeconduct and murdered on the king's orders. These deaths left Pedro sole heir to a vast fortune.

On 6–7 January 1364, Pope Urban V granted Pedro a canonry at Coimbra on the condition that he give up the archdeaconry of Toro and his other benefices in the diocese of Zamora to Pedro Fernández. That same year, Pedro obtained a baccalaureate in canon law from the University of Toulouse. He then served for a time as a rector of the University of Perugia, where he studied under Baldo degli Ubaldi.

By December 1364, Pedro had taken up a chair at the University of Rome with a salary of 200 florins per annum. On 1 December, Pope Urban granted him a canonry and prebend at Lisbon Cathedral. At the renewed outbreak of civil war in Castile, he left to join the army of Count Henry of Trastámara. He had left Rome by August 1366, when he asked to exchange his canonry in Coimbra for one that had just opened up in Seville.

According to Pedro López de Ayala, Pedro Tenorio fought on horseback and was captured in the Battle of Nájera on 3 April 1367. Through the intercession of the Black Prince and Cardinal Guy of Boulogne, his life was spared and he was ransomed. He afterwards spent some time in Portugal in the house of Aires Gomes da Silva. He returned to Avignon later that year.

Pedro followed Urban and the curia back to Rome in 1367. He received his doctorate in 1368 in Rome. In 1370, he followed the curia back to Avignon. He was ordained a priest and given the archdeaconry of Calatrava.

== Bishop of Coimbra ==
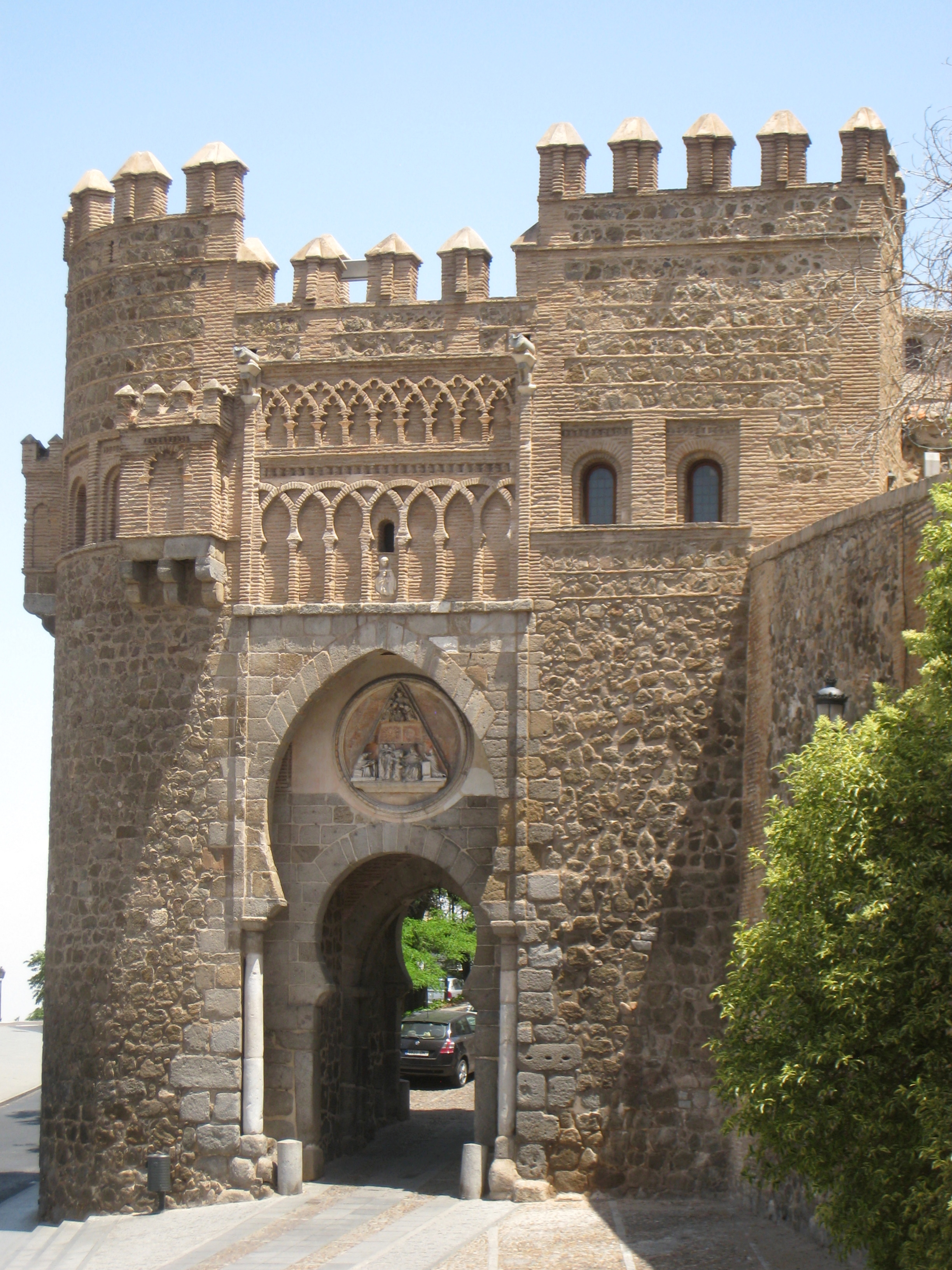
Puerta del Sol, a gate built into the wall of Toledo by Pedro Tenorio

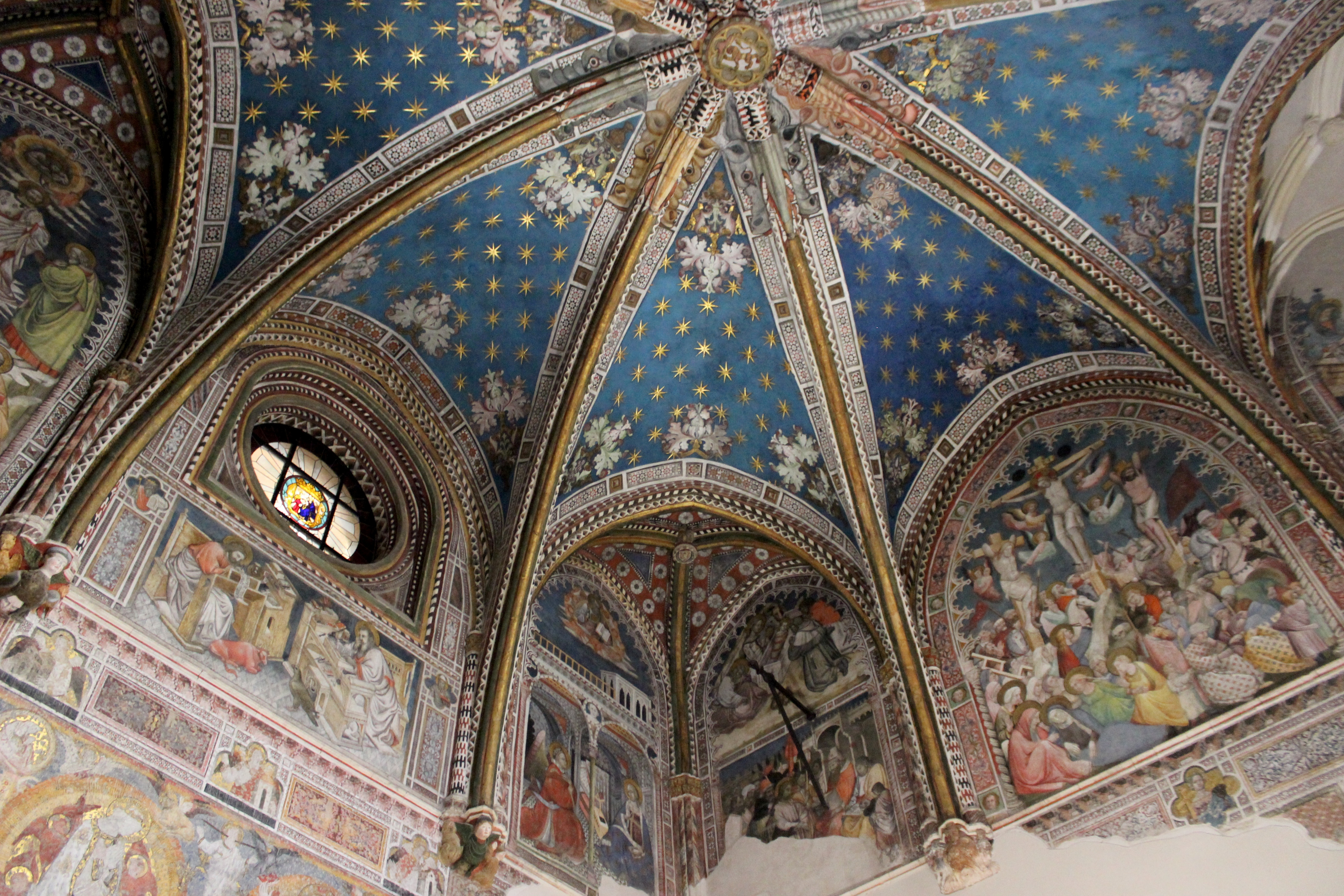
The painted walls and vault of the chapel of San Blas commissioned by Pedro Tenorio

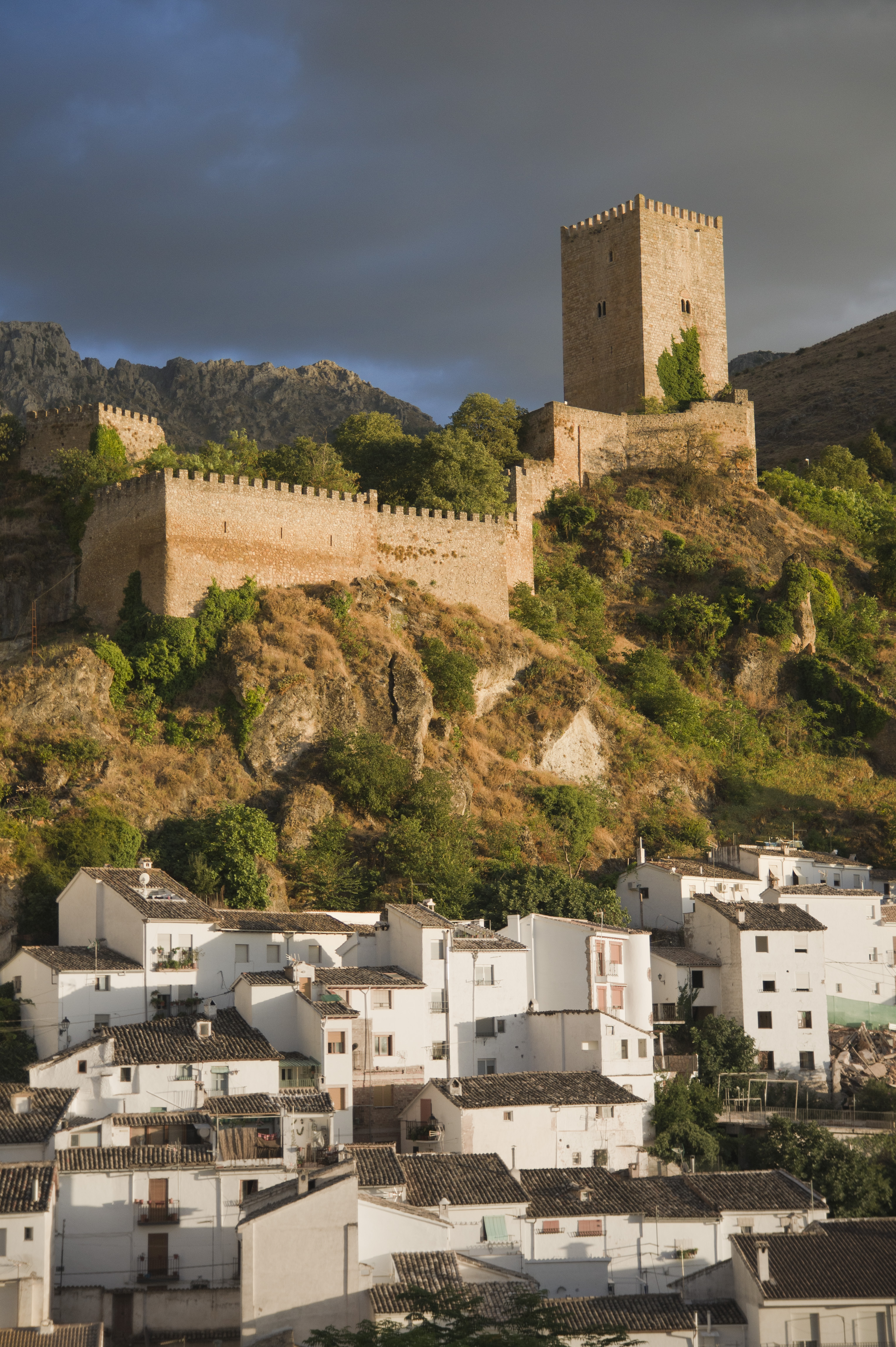
The castle of La Yedra above Cazorla, renovated by Pedro Tenorio

On 19 May 1371, Pedro succeeded Vasco Fernández de Toledo as bishop of Coimbra. He was consecrated in Avignon by Guy of Boulogne, in whose household he had served. He visited his diocese in Portugal, but spent little time there. He was probably present at the Cortes in Lisbon on 8 August 1371. In 1372, his vicar was Fernão Gil and in 1373–1374 it was Giral Pires. He helped in the negotiations for the marriage of Beatrice of Portugal.

When Archbishop Gómez Manrique of Toledo died in 1375, the canons of Toledo were divided on his successor. Some elected the dean, Pedro Fernández Cabeza de Vaca, while others chose Juan García Manrique, the bishop of Sigüenza and Gómez Manrique's nephew. The latter candidate had the support of Henry of Trastámara, who had succeeded Peter as king in 1369. When the disputed election was taken to Pope Gregory XI, he imposed Pedro Díaz de Tenorio as his candidate and appointed Pedro Fernández Cabeza de Vaca to fill the see of Coimbra.

== Archbishop of Toledo ==
Pedro became archbishop of Toledo on 13 January 1377. He immediately undertook a visitation of his diocese. In 1378, the Western Schism began. Two rival popes appeared, Urban VI at Rome and Clement VII at Avignon. Pedro was neutral but leaned towards Urban VI, regarding his election as suspect but the cardinals' actions afterwards as tending to confirm him as legitimate—or at least as estopping their right to impugn the election. On ending the schism, he took the conciliarist position, that only an ecumenical council could decide the issue. His neutral approach was approved in a royal council and maintained for two years before, in 1381, Castile officially recognized Clement VII. Throughout his pontificate, Pedro had to deal with competing papal provisions of his diocese's canonries.

In May 1379, Pedro held a diocesan synod in Alcalá de Henares and published a new diocesan constitution. He converted many of his tenants to fixed leases. He continued work on the cathedral of Toledo. The lower cloister and the choir were primarily his doing. He hired Gherardo Starnina to paint the reredos in the chapel of San Salvador (today in that of San Eugenio). Starnina, with Juan Rodríguez de Toledo, also painted the walls and ceiling of the chapel of San Blas. With Clement VII's support, he intended to convert the collegiate church of Talavera from secular canons to regular, but the plan failed. He built the Hieronymite convent of Santa Catalina at Talavera. On 15 October 1383, he donated his large library, collected while he was a professor abroad, to the cathedral.

Besides his religious and political activities, Pedro was active in public works. In 1390, he built a bridge over the Tagus and the attached town of Villafranca, today known as El Puente del Arzobispo. This bridge was open to the public and permitted pilgrim traffic to the monastery of Saint Mary of Guadalupe. In 1390, he was authorized by King John I to raise Torrelaguna from a village to a town. In Toledo, he renovated the bridge of Saint Martin and built the gate known as the Puerta del Sol. He also constructed two hospitals, a hostel, a parish church and bridges over the Guarrazar in La Sisla and over the Tagus in Alameda de la Sagra.

Pedro also looked to the military defence of the archiepiscopal lordship, especially against Portugal after the battle of Aljubarrota (1385). He acquired for the archdiocese the towns of Alcolea de Torote, Utrilla and Almaluez. He renovated or rebuilt the archiepiscopal castles of Alamín, Alcalá la Real, Almonacid, Canales, La Guardia, La Yedra, San Servando and Yepes. He also restored San Torcaz into a prison for clergy. He repaired the walls of Alcalá de Henares, Brihuega, Talamanca de Jarama, Torrelaguna and Uceda (where the inhabitants of Torrelaguna had to make a contribution in 1386).

Following the death of John I on 9 October 1390 and the accession of the child Henry III, Pedro tried to direct events by appealing to an old will of John's and to the Siete Partidas, which stipulated that there should be a council of regency of one, three or five men. In the event, the Cortes appointed a regency council, which Pedro led until August 1393. This period was marked by the Seville pogrom (1391), a Nasrid raid on Murcia (1392) and a fifteen-year truce with Portugal (1393). In 1393, amidst dissension in the council, he threatened to resign. He was imprisoned for a time and several Toledan castles confiscated. Later that year, he obtained a papal judgement against the crown in order to regain possession of the castles of Alcalá, La Guardia, Talavera and Uceda.

Pedro died on 18 or 28 May 1399 in Toledo. He was buried in the chapel of San Blas, which he also named in his last will as his universal heir.

== Writings ==
The start of Pedro Tenorio's only known poem, Bestias son de las montañas

Several writings of Pedro Tenorio are known:

- The acts of the diocesan synod of May 1379, primarily Pedro's work, are preserved.
- He wrote a letter to Cardinal Jean de La Grange from Medina del Campo on 21 September 1379.
- His response in Latin to the cardinals' requests for legal opinions on the elections of Urban VI and Clement VII has been published as Acta Domini Toletani super facto Schismatis ad Dominum Sancti Eustachii Cardinalem de necessitate et utilitate Concilii Generalis concludens. Chronologically, his is the fourth opinion known. He backs Urban and directly responds to the Clementist opinion published by Cardinal Pierre Flandrin in February 1380. Walter Ullmann considers his the ablest early effort at reconciling the two camps. According to Joëlle Rollo-Koster, his tone and style approach préciosité, but Ullmann calls his language "frank and dignified" and praises his "unbiased attitude" and "genuine sense of justice".
- He wrote a "very frank" letter to Cardinal Martín de Zalba on 10 June 1397 concerning the schism in which he advocated the via cessionis (a pope must resign) over the via iusticie (determining the legitimate pope). In reference to the infeasibility of the latter, he asked, "Who would want to be judged to have been schismatic for the past twenty years?" A letter of Henry III to King Martin of Aragon dated the same day was probably written by Pedro. The official Castilian position had been influenced by the French envoy Simon de Cramaud.
- A vernacular poem by Pedro is preserved in the Cancionero de Baena (no. 154) alongside six poems addressed to him by Alfonso Álvarez de Villasandino (nos. 152–153, 155–158).

== Bibliography ==
- Beltrán de Heredia, Vicente, ed. (1970). Cartulario de la universidad de Salamanca (1218–1600). Vol. 1. Ediciones Universidad de Salamanca.
- Dykmans, Marc (1977). "La troisième élection du pape Urbain VI". Archivum Historiae Pontificiae. 15: 217–264. JSTOR 23563814.
- Fois, Mario (1981). "La crítica dell'arcivescovo di Toledo Pedro Tenorio al trattato del cardenal Pierre Flandrin sull'inizio dello scisma d'Occidente (settembre 1379)". Hispania Sacra. 33 (68): 563–592.
- Gerli, E. Michael (2003). "Tenorio, Pedro". In E. Michael Gerli (ed.). Medieval Iberia: An Encyclopedia. Routledge. pp. 780–781.
- Gonzálvez Ruiz, Ramón (2018). "Tenorio, Pedro". Diccionario biográfico español. Real Academia de la Historia.
- Kaminsky, Howard (1983). Simon de Cramaud and the Great Schism. Rutgers University Press. ISBN 9780813509495.
- Linehan, Peter (2000). "Castile, Navarre and Portugal". In Michael Jones (ed.). The New Cambridge Medieval History. Vol. 6: c.1300–c.1415. Cambridge University Press. pp. 619–650.
- Martène, Edmond; Durand, Ursin, eds. (1727). Thesaurus Novus Anecdotorum. Vol. 2. Paris.
- Morujão, Maria do Rosário (2009). "Bispos em tempos de guerra: os prelados de Coimbra na segunda metade do século XIV". A Guerra e a Sociedade na Idade Média: VI Jornadas Luso-Espanholas de Estudos Medievais. Vol. 1. Coimbra. pp. 539–550.
- Merlos, Magdalena (2000). "Arquitectura militar en las villas medievales del Arzobispo de Toledo: función y significado" (PDF). Espacio, Tiempo y Forma. Serie VII, Historia del Arte. 13: 27–50.
- Rollo-Koster, Joëlle (2009). "Civil Violence and the Initiation of the Schism". In Joëlle Rollo-Koster; Thomas M. Izbicki (eds.). A Companion to the Great Western Schism (1378–1417). Brill. pp. 9–65.
- Sánchez Herrero, J., ed. (1976). Concilios provinciales y sínodos toledanos de los siglos XIV y XV. Universidad de La Laguna.
- Sánchez Sesa, Rafael (1995). "Notas sobre la participación de un eclesiástico en la guerra a finales del siglo XIV: Don Pedro Tenorio, arzobispo de Toledo (1377–1399)". Archivos Leoneses. 97: 281–292.
- Sánchez Sesa, Rafael (1998). "Don Pedro Tenorio (c. 1328–1399): Aproximación a la vinculación eclesiastica, familiar y política de un arzobispo toledano al reino de Portugal" (PDF). Revista da Faculdade de Letras. História (Porto). Ser. 2. 15: 1479–1492.
- Sánchez Sesa, Rafael (1999). "Obispos procedentes de Castilla y proyectos de reforma en la sede de Coimbra (1358–1407)". Hispania Sacra. 51 (104): 753–783. doi:10.3989/hs.1999.v51.i104.599.
- Suárez Fernández, Luis (1953). "Don Pedro Tenorio, arzobispo de Toledo (1375–99)". Homenaje a don Ramón Menéndez Pidal. Vol. IV. Madrid. pp. 601–627.
- Ullmann, Walter (1948). The Origins of the Great Schism: A Study in Fourteenth-Century Ecclesiastical History. Burns, Oates & Washbourne. ISBN 9780208012777.
- Villalon, L. J. Andrew; Kagay, Donald J. (2017). To Win and Lose a Medieval Battle: Nájera (April 3, 1367), a Pyrrhic Victory for the Black Prince. Brill.
