= Inés Rey =

Politician

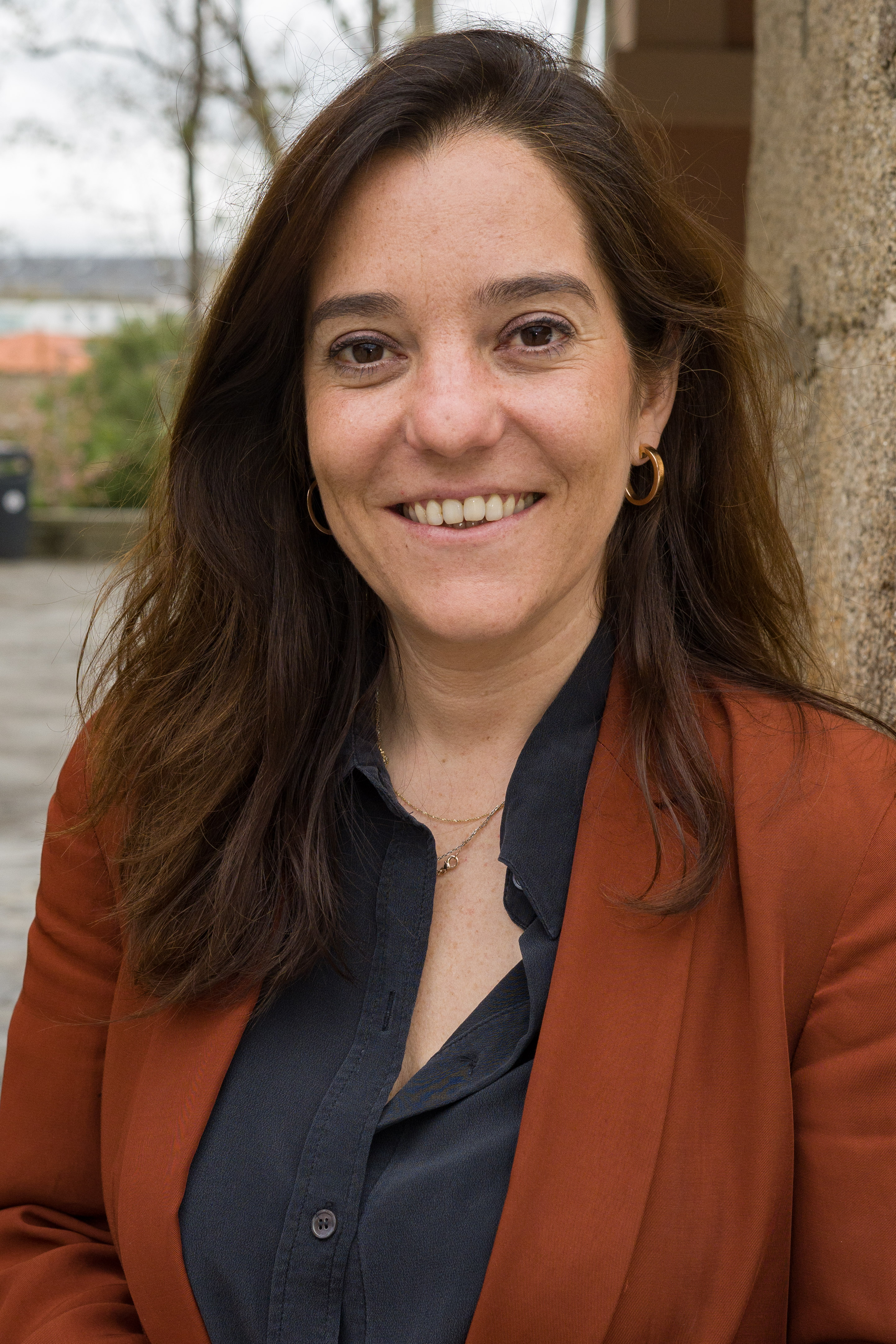

Mayor of A Coruña
- Incumbent
- Assumed office 15 June 2019
- Preceded by: Xulio Ferreiro

Vice president of the Spanish Federation of Municipalities and Provinces
- Incumbent
- Assumed office 23 September 2023
- Preceded by: José María García Urbano

Personal details
- Born: Inés Rey García; 11 July 1982 (age 44) A Coruña, Spain
- Party: Spanish Socialist Workers' Party
- Education: University of A Coruña

Inés Rey García (born 11 July 1982) is a Spanish Socialist Workers' Party politician. She was elected mayor of A Coruña in 2019.

== Early and personal life ==
Rey was born in A Coruña in Galicia on the same day that Spain hosted the 1982 FIFA World Cup final. She studied law at the University of A Coruña, where she was also the most voted member of the student union. As of 2019, she has two children.

In 2001, 19-year-old Rey joined the Spanish Socialist Workers' Party (PSOE), and two years later she had her first meeting with the city's mayor Francisco Vázquez Vázquez. Her time was mostly spent on her legal profession, apart from in 2011, when she was placed number two on the PSOE list for the Senate of Spain for the A Coruña constituency; incumbent mayor Javier Losada topped the list and was the only member elected.

== Political career ==
Rey was the youngest and only female of four candidates in the PSOE primaries for mayor of A Coruña in 2019. She took 53.4% of the vote in the second round, a run-off over incumbent party spokesperson on the city council, José Manuel García; García had taken the most votes of the first round. In the elections in May, the People's Party (PP) received the most votes and nine seats, with the PSOE marginally behind but with the same amount of seats. Through a pact with the six councillors of Marea Atlántica, Rey had the support of the majority of the 27-person council and was expected to be installed as mayor; she had never held any public or party office before. The two councillors from the Galician Nationalist Bloc also voted in her favour in June, making her the first female mayor of the city.

In the 2023 local elections, Rey's PSOE rose to 11 seats, gaining a majority with the support of the four councillors of the BNG, but governing alone. In September 2023, she was elected vice president of the Spanish Federation of Municipalities and Provinces (FEMP).

In February 2025, Rey gave Ibrahima Diack and Magatte N'Diaye the titles of adopted sons of A Coruña. The two Senegalese men, who were irregular workers, were the only witnesses to attempt to intervene against the homophobic murder of Samuel Luiz, while others only stood and filmed it.

Rey announced the withdrawal of A Coruña as a host of the 2030 FIFA World Cup in March 2026, saying that the city and the club Deportivo de La Coruña would end up "with a mortgage" from it. Rey said that funds would instead go towards renovating the Estadio Riazor and other sporting facilities. The PP spokesman in the city council, Miguel Lorenzo Torres, requested transparency on the financial decisions.
