= Heliodoro Gallego =

Spanish politician

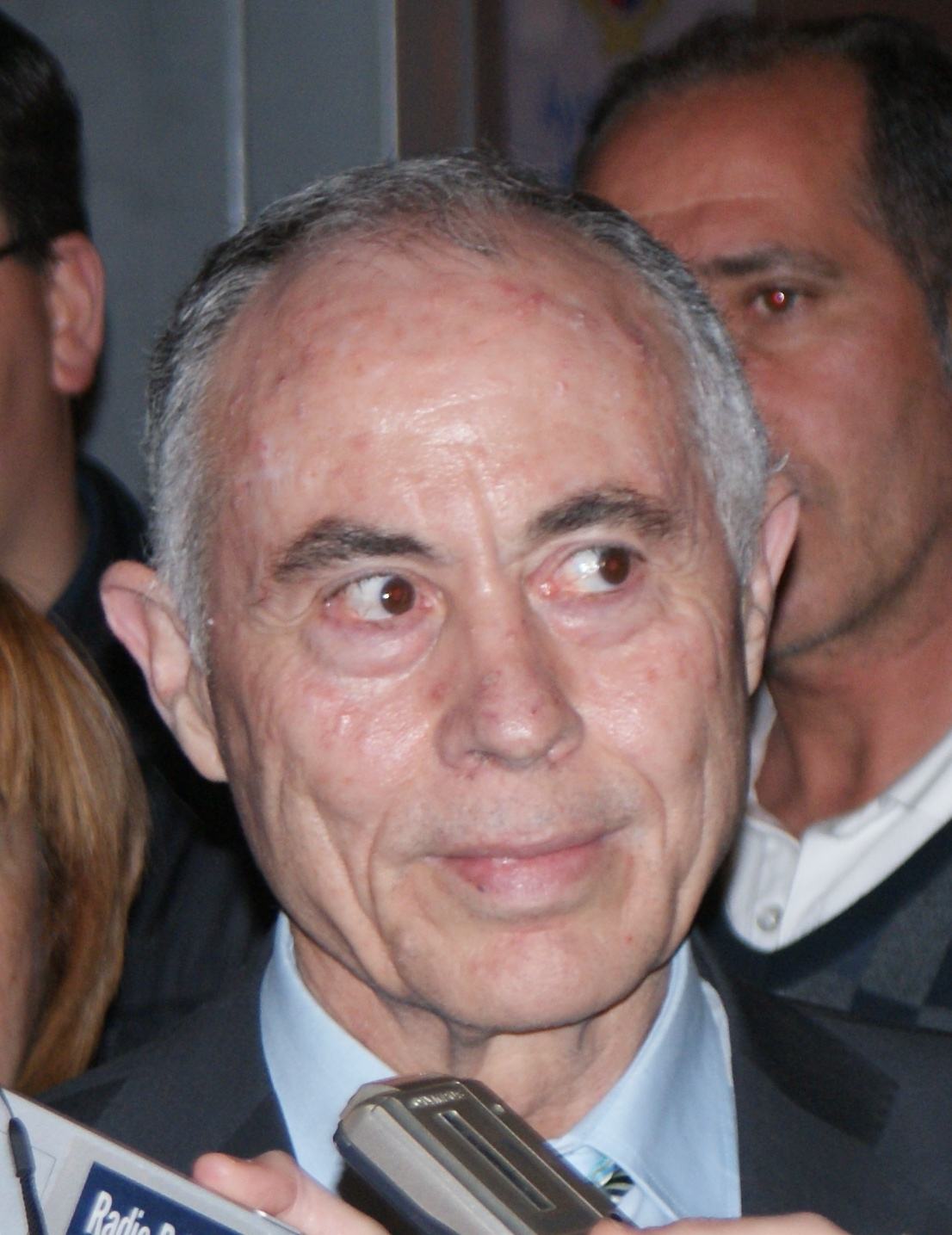

Heliodoro Gallego Cuesta (born 9 January 1949) is a politician of the Spanish Socialist Workers' Party (PSOE). He was a city councillor in Palencia from 1987 to 2015, and the mayor from 1991 to 1995 and 1999 to 2011. He also sat in the Senate of Spain from 1986 to 2000. He led the PSOE in the Province of Palencia from 1988 to 2008, and was president of the Spanish Federation of Municipalities and Provinces (FEMP) for 21 months from February 2006.

== Biography ==
Gallego was born in Villalbarba in the Province of Valladolid, and graduated with a law degree from the University of Valladolid. He joined the Unión General de Trabajadores in 1978. As of 2006, he was married and had two children.

In 1986, Gallego was elected to the Senate of Spain by the Palencia constituency, and remained in office until 2000. In local elections the following year, he led the PSOE list in Palencia, and became the city's first Socialist mayor four years later. He lost the office to Marcelo de Manuel of the People's Party (PP) in 1995, winning it back with absolute majorities in 1999 and 2003. During Gallego's time in office, the city council built the Estadio Nueva Balastera for football and rugby, opening in 2006 at a cost of €18 million.

In February 2006, Gallego was elected leader of the Spanish Federation of Municipalities and Provinces (FEMP), replacing Francisco Vázquez Vázquez of A Coruña. In November 2007, the PSOE substituted him for Pedro Castro Vázquez of Getafe. In May that year, he won another term as mayor of Palencia, retaining his party's 13 seats on the council.

Gallego was secretary-general of the PSOE in the Province of Palencia from 1988 to his decision not to run in November 2008, endorsing the uncontested candidacy of congressional deputy Julio Villarrubia. Disagreement with Gallego's late withdrawal resulted in 10.4% of delegates at the election not voting for Villarubia. In the 2011 Spanish local elections, Gallego's 12-year mandate ended as Alfonso Polanco of the PP became mayor. He remained as leader of the opposition, announcing in February 2015 that he would not stand in that year's election.
