= María José García-Pelayo =

Spanish politician (born 1968)

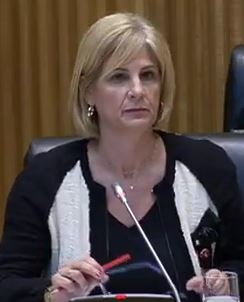

María José García-Pelayo Jurado (born 6 January 1968) is a Spanish People's Party (PP) politician. She has served on the city council of her hometown of Jerez de la Frontera since 1995, with three spells as mayor (2003–2005; 2011–2013; 2023–present). She has also sat in both houses of the Cortes Generales including three spells in the Senate (2011–2015; 2022–2023; 2023–), and in the Parliament of Andalusia (1996–2011).

== Biography ==
Born in Jerez de la Frontera, Andalusia, García-Pelayo graduated with a law degree from the University of Cádiz. She was introduced to politics at age 24 by Miguel Arias Cañete, a law firm colleague who later became a government minister. First elected to her hometown's city council in 1995, she became mayor for the first time in 2003. She later reflected that she did not feel that she was mayor due to the dominance of her predecessor and coalition party, Pedro Pacheco of the Socialist Party of Andalusia (PSA). In January 2005, a motion of no confidence in her was supported by the PSA and handed the mayoralty to Pilar Sánchez of the Spanish Socialist Workers' Party (PSOE).

García-Pelayo served in the provincial deputation of the Province of Cádiz as the PP spokesperson from 1999 to 2003, as well as serving in the Parliament of Andalusia where she was vice president. In June 2011, she was sworn in for a second term as mayor, after her party took 15 seats on the council. She left the regional parliament at the end of 2011, after being elected to the Senate of Spain in the general election. In the 2015 local elections, the PP was the most voted in Jerez with 11 seats, but lost power to a three-way pact between the PSOE, Ganemos Jerez and the United Left (IU). Later that year, she was investigated by the Supreme Court of Spain for alleged perversion of justice and falsification of documents, while other local members of her party were investigated in the Gürtel case. The case against her was dropped in May 2016.

In the 2015 Spanish general election, García-Pelayo was elected to the Congress of Deputies by the Cádiz constituency. In July 2022, she moved back to the Senate, when she was named by President of the Regional Government of Andalusia Juanma Moreno. She began a third spell as mayor of Jerez after winning an absolute majority of seats in the 2023 local elections, and was also elected for a third stint in the Senate by the constituency. In September 2023, she was inaugurated as president of the Spanish Federation of Municipalities and Provinces (FEMP) after the PP took the majority of mayoralties, thus succeeding the Socialist mayor of Vigo, Abel Caballero.
