= Manuel Soto =

Manuel Soto may refer to:

- Manuel Ángel Núñez Soto (born 1951), Mexican politician
- Manuel Esteban Soto (born 1994), Colombian athlete
- Manoel Soto (1944–2019), Spanish politician, also spelled as Manuel Soto
- Manuel Soto (wrestler), (born 1946), Puerto Rican professional wrestler, known for his time in WWWF/WWF.
