= Galician campaign (1384) =

Portuguese naval campaign

- Part of 1383–1385 Crisis
Date	1384
Location	Galicia, Castile
Result	Portuguese victory

Belligerents
Kingdom of Portugal	Crown of Castile

Commanders and leaders
Pedro, Count of Trastámara	Juan García Manrique, Archbishop of Santiago de Compostela

Strength
Unknown	Unknown

Casualties and losses
None	2 ships sunk 1 galley captured

The Galician Campaign of 1384 was a Portuguese naval campaign commanded by a Castilian noble, Don Pedro de Trastámara, who sided with John I of Portugal. The Portuguese, whose main ship was the Royal galley itself, made a series of attacks on Galicia, conquering the towns of Baiona, A Coruña and Neda and burning the coastal town of Ferrol to the ground. Additionally, the Portuguese destroyed approximately 2 large Castilian ships and captured a galley. All three ships were carrying supplies to the Castilian army besieging Lisbon.

When the Portuguese returned to Porto celebrations were held to honour their victory.

== See also ==
- History of Portugal
- Kingdom of Portugal
- Treaty of Windsor (1386)
- João das Regras
- Hundred Years War
