= Tomás Rodríguez =

Tomás Rodríguez may refer to:

- Tomas Rodriguez (actor) (born 1998), Filipino actor and singer
- Tomás Rodríguez Bolaños (1944–2018), Spanish industrial technician and politician
- Tomás Rodríguez (cyclist), Venezuelan cyclist, competed in the 2002 Vuelta a Venezuela
- Tomás Rodríguez (footballer) (born 1999), Panamanian footballer
- Tomás Rodríguez Pinilla (1815–1886), Spanish politician and intellectual, Under-Secretary of Foreign Affairs in 1873
- Tomás Rodríguez Rubí, (1817–1890), Spanish dramatist and politician, director of the Teatro Español in Madrid
- Tomás Rodríguez (strongman), Cuban strongman, competed in 2014 World's Strongest Man
- Tómas Rodríguez (weightlifter) (born 1962), Panamanian Olympic weightlifter

== See also ==
- Tomás Rodrigues da Cunha (1598–1638), beatified by the Roman Catholic Church as Redemptus of the Cross
- Tom Rodriguez (born 1987), Filipino actor
- Thomas Rodríguez (born 1996), Chilean footballer
