= Ángel Torres (businessman) =

Spanish businessperson, owner of Getafe CF

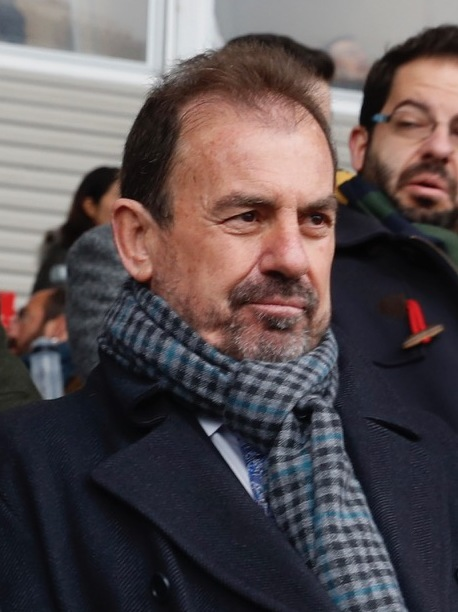
Torres in 2018

Ángel Torres Sánchez (born 7 May 1952) is a Spanish businessman, owner of Getafe CF since 2002.

He made his fortune in construction and nightlife in the city of Getafe before purchasing the football club in 2002. Under his ownership, the club became a mainstay in La Liga, contested consecutive finals of the Copa del Rey in 2007 and 2008, and competed in European competitions.

== Early life and career ==
Born in Recas in the province of Toledo, Torres lost his father to a traffic accident when he was 14, and was orphaned at 18. He moved to Getafe in the Community of Madrid and worked as a mechanic. At Kelvinator, a freezer manufacturer, he lost his job while striking as a member of the Workers' Commissions (CCOO); he was also fired from a factory in Fuenlabrada in solidarity with another employee whose service was terminated.

In the 1980s, Torres prospered in construction during a boom in the expansion of Madrid's commuter towns. He sold his interests in the industry in order to buy bars, bingo halls and nightclubs in one of those towns, Getafe.

== Getafe CF ==
In 2002, the mayor of Getafe, Pedro Castro Vázquez, convinced Torres to buy the football club Getafe CF. Upon finishing as runners-up in the 2003–04 Segunda División, Getafe CF achieved promotion to La Liga for the first time, and by 2023–24 had only spent one season back in the Segunda División, in 2016–17. The team reached the Copa del Rey final in 2007 and 2008, and reached the quarter-finals on their European debut in the 2007–08 UEFA Cup, losing on the away goals rule in the last seconds against FC Bayern Munich after a 4–4 draw. Torres reflected that Bayern president Franz Beckenbauer "will remember for the rest of his life where Getafe is". In April 2011, it was widely reported that Torres had sold Getafe CF to the Royal Emirates Group, who had announced such news. He clarified that he had visited the company in Dubai, but only to seek sponsorship.

In December 2004, Torres suggested that his team play in blackface as an anti-racist gesture, after some of his club's fans racially abused FC Barcelona player Samuel Eto'o.

The city council removed the name of Alfonso Pérez from Getafe's Estadio Coliseum in 2023 after the former player made disparaging remarks about women footballers. Torres said he was indifferent to the change but saw it as an opportunity to make money from naming rights.
