= Emma González Bermello =

Spanish politician (1931–2014)

Emma Rosa González Bermello (21 September 1931 – 14 January 2014) was a Spanish politician. She was the first woman to be mayor of Vigo or any other place in Galicia, serving for 15 days in January 1976 and again from 1978 to 1979. She was also one of the first three women in the Parliament of Galicia, where she served from 1981 to 1989 and represented three parties.

== Biography ==
Born in Ourense, González moved to the fellow Galician city of Vigo at the age of three. She and her husband Jesús owned the electronics store Baladrón. The family became prominent in local politics in the final years of Francoist Spain, being nicknamed the "Baladrón clan" in allusion to the Kennedy family in the United States.

After the death of Francisco Franco in November 1975, all mayors appointed by his regime had to resign in January 1976, with a new mayor to be chosen by the councils. Incumbent Joaquín García Picher stepped aside in Vigo, with González serving as the interim for the final two weeks of the month before he was reinstated. This made her the first female mayor in Vigo and in Galicia as a whole. García Picher resigned in 1978 due to economic turmoil, and González returned to office. In the first democratic elections in April 1979, she was defeated by Manoel Soto of the Spanish Socialist Workers' Party (PSOE).

Standing for the Union of the Democratic Centre (UCD), González was elected to the new Parliament of Galicia in its first election in 1981, being one of three women in the 71-seat legislature. In 1985, she was re-elected for the People's Alliance (AP), but left in 1987 for the Galician Coalition (CG) in solidarity with vice president Xosé Luís Barreiro. They voted in favour of the PSOE's Fernando González Laxe's vote of no confidence that brought down the AP government of Gerardo Fernández Albor.

González then left politics permanently, despite offers made for her return. She had three children, and was a widow for six years before her death at the age of 82. She had been living with Alzheimer's disease.
