= Pedro Aparicio (politician) =

Spanish politician (1942–2014)

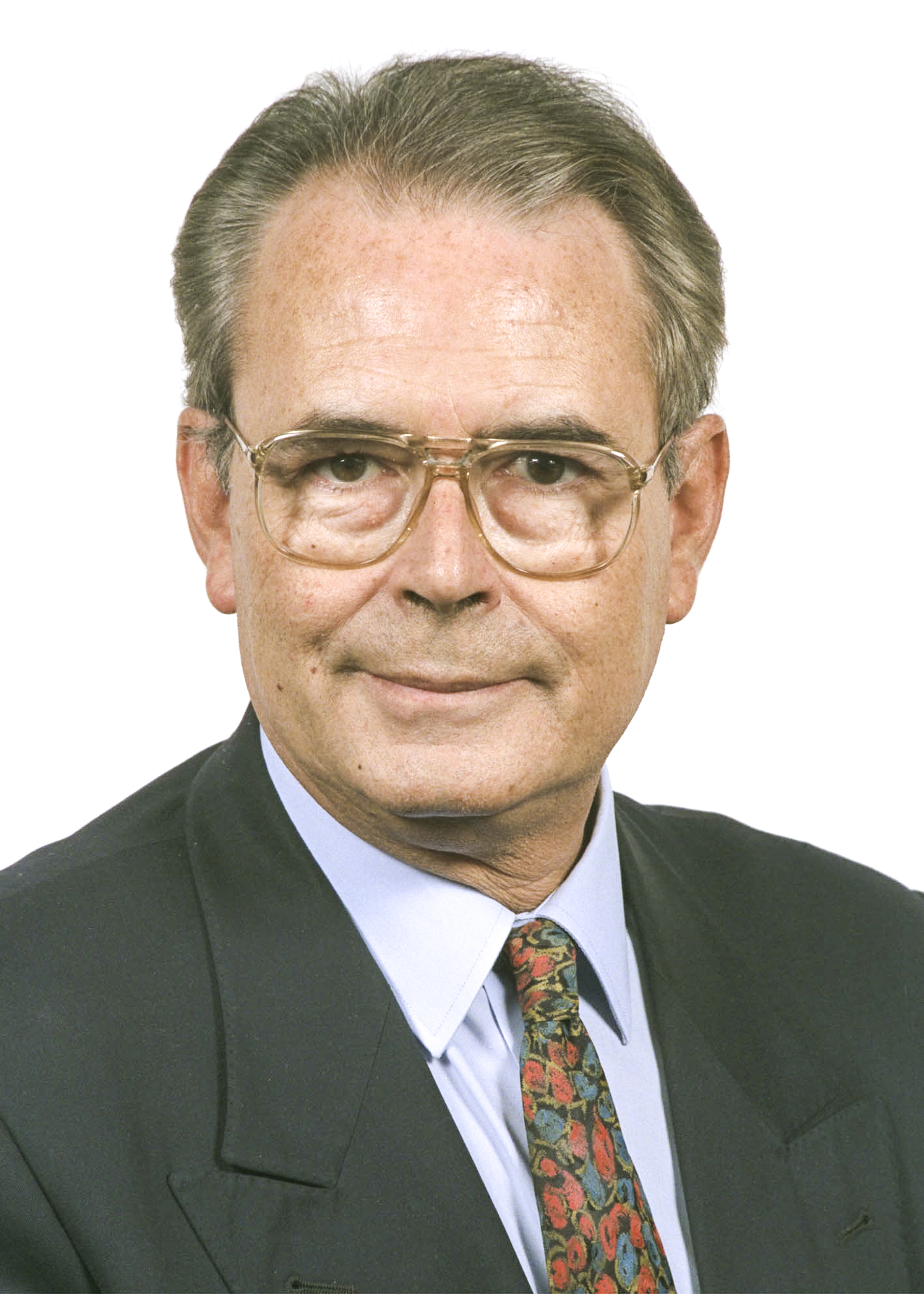
- Aparicio in 1994

Member of the European Parliament
- In office 1994–2004
- Constituency: Spain

Mayor of Málaga
- In office 1979–1995
- Preceded by: Luis Merino Bayona
- Succeeded by: Celia Villalobos

Personal details
- Born: Pedro Aparicio Sánchez; 4 October 1942 Madrid, Spain
- Died: 25 September 2014 (aged 71) Málaga, Spain
- Party: Spanish Socialist Workers' Party (PSOE)
- Occupation: Doctor

Pedro Aparicio Sánchez (4 October 1942 – 25 September 2014) was a Spanish Socialist Workers' Party (PSOE) politician. He was a doctor by profession, and a professor at the University of Málaga. He was the first democratically elected mayor of Málaga from 1979 to 1995, and a Member of the European Parliament from 1994 to 2004. He was a founder and first president of the Spanish Federation of Municipalities and Provinces, and was the president of the PSOE in Andalusia from 1994 to 2000.

== Education and medical career ==
Aparicio graduated in Medicine and Surgery from the Complutense University of Madrid in 1966 and the Official School of Journalism in 1973. He achieved a doctorate from the Autonomous University of Barcelona in 1976. He was a professor at the University of Málaga and head of the vascular surgery section at the Carlos Haya Hospital in the city.

== Political career ==
Aparicio was the first democratically elected mayor of Málaga in 1979. Though his party needed to form a coalition with the Communist Party and the Andalusian Party in that year, he was re-elected with absolute majorities in 1983, 1987 and 1991. In 1995, he left office as Celia Villalobos of the People's Party was elected. His main priority at the beginning of democracy in Spain was to improve the lives of people in Málaga's outskirts, where roads were not paved and many homes lacked electricity and running water. During his mandate, the city founded the Fundación Picasso which bought Pablo Picasso's birthplace and opened it to the public, while the Teatro Cervantes was opened and the Málaga Symphony Orchestra was initiated.

Aparicio was a founder and the first president of the Spanish Federation of Municipalities and Provinces (FEMP). His last political roles were as president of the PSOE in Andalusia (1994–2000) and as a Member of the European Parliament representing Spain from 1994 to 2004.

Aparicio was an admirer of Salvador Allende, the socialist president of Chile deposed in the 1973 coup d'état, and kept a photograph of him in his office. He spent the night of the 1981 Spanish coup d'état attempt in his office so that he could die there if he had been targeted for his ideals.

== Death ==
Aparicio exercised every morning to manage his diabetes, hypertension and excess weight. At the end of his daily routine at a local sports centre on 25 September 2014, he died suddenly of heart failure at the age of 71. The city council suspended its work for the day upon hearing the news, and declared two days of mourning. His funeral was held on 2 October.

A prize for journalism in Málaga was named after Aparicio and first awarded in 2017.
