= Ramón Sainz de Varanda =

Spanish Socialist Workers' Party politician

Ramón Sainz de Varanda y Jiménez de la Iglesia (5 January 1925 – 10 January 1986) was a Spanish Socialist Workers' Party (PSOE) politician. He was the first democratically elected mayor of Zaragoza from 1979 until his death, and a Senator from 1977 to 1979.

== Biography ==
Sainz de Varanda in Guadalajara, Castilla–La Mancha. His father and two brothers were assassinated by the Republican forces at the start of the Spanish Civil War. He fled to San Sebastián where his uncle was the governor before settling in Zaragoza. In 1948, he graduated with a law degree from the University of Zaragoza, where he also taught while practicing law.

In 1965, Sainz de Varanda opened his own law firm and soon became Dean of the Zaragoza Bar Association and the Consejo General de la Abogacía Española, the General Council of Spanish lawyers. He was a specialist in Aragon's fueros, widely believed to have been abolished in the 1707 Nueva Planta decrees.

Sainz de Varanda joined the Spanish Socialist Workers' Party (PSOE) and Unión General de Trabajadores (UGT) in 1976. He was elected to the Senate of Spain in 1977, and promoted Aragon's campaign for autonomy. As the first democratically elected mayor of Zaragoza in 1979, he worked on infrastructure and development and reclaimed the Aljafería palace from the military and oversaw the creation of the Pablo Gargallo Museum. He was president of the Spanish Federation of Municipalities and Provinces (FEMP) from 1983 to 1985.
