= Spanish Federation of Municipalities and Provinces =

- Federación Española de Municipios y Provincias
- Logotype of the FEMP

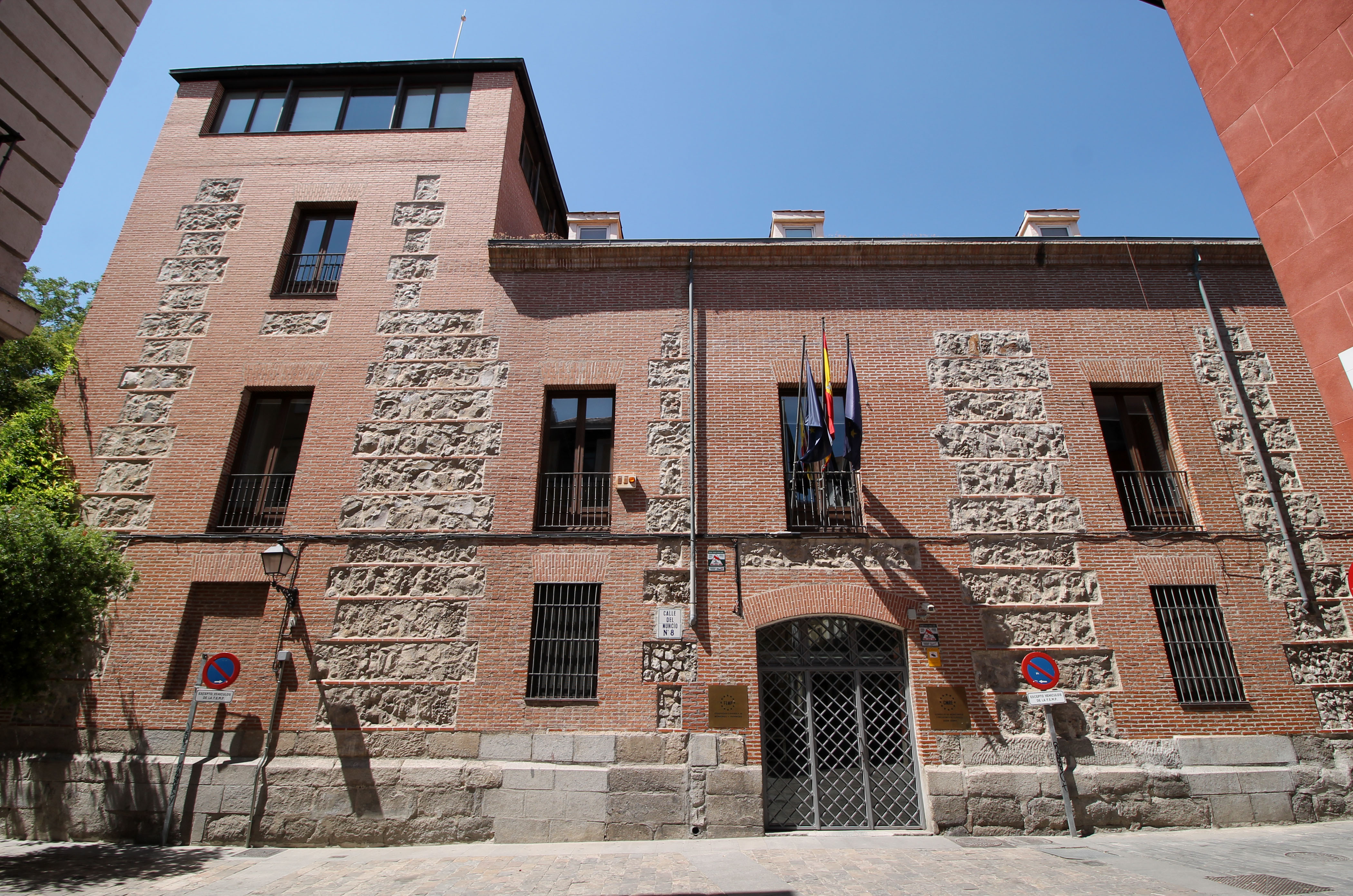
- FEMP Headquearters

Federation overview
- Formed: June 13, 1981; 45 years ago
- Jurisdiction: Spain
- Headquarters: Madrid
- Federation executive: María José García-Pelayo, Mayor of Jerez de la Frontera, President
- Website: www.femp.es

The Spanish Federation of Municipalities and Provinces (FEMP) is an association of local governments in Spain (town councils, provincial councils, island councils, island cabildos, etc) for the purpose of representing the interests of local government to other government authorities. In June 2023, there were 7,324 members of a potential 12,060.

The founding and statutory aims of the FEMP are the promotion and defense of the autonomy of the local government authorities (known in the constitution as local entities), the representation and defense of the general interests of local government before the bodies of Public Administration, the development and consolidation of the European spirit at the local level based on autonomy and solidarity among local authorities, promoting and fostering friendly relations and cooperation with local gov ernment authorities, especially in the European, Ibero-American and Arab areas, the provision of services to members.

FEMP’s annual budget for 2026 is €33.9 million. All members pay a fee based on their population, although the bulk of the budget, 72%, is provided by the Ministry of Finance.

== Foundation ==
The origins of the FEMP dates back to 1979, when a group of around twenty mayors started a process to increase the recognition of the local administration. Between 1980 and 1981 these mayors elaborated the internal rules of the FEMP and the constituent assembly met June 13 and 14, 1981.

In 1985, the Federation was officially recognized under the provisions of Additional Provision 5 of the Local Government Act and was declared a Public Utility Association by agreement of the Council of Ministers on June 26, 1985. FEMP is also the Spanish branch of the Council of European Municipalities and Regions (CEMR), and is the official headquarters of the Ibero-American Organization of Intermunicipal Cooperation (ICCO).

== Headquarters ==
FEMP headquarters is located at 8 Nuncio Street, Madrid, in an old house-palace from the end of the 17th century.

== Regional affiliates ==
Each of the regions or autonomous communities also has a local government association. FEMP has signed voluntary cooperation agreements with 17 such associations including:

- Andalusian Federation of Municipalities and Provinces, in the Autonomous Community of Andalusia.
- Aragonese Federation of Municipalities, Counties and Provinces, in the Autonomous Community of Aragón.
- Asturian Federation of Councils, in the Autonomous Community of Asturias.
- Federation of Local Entities of the Balearic Islands, in the Autonomous Community of the Balearic Islands.
- Canary Islands Federation of Municipalities, in the Autonomous Community of the Canary Islands.
- Federation of Municipalities of Cantabria, in the Autonomous Community of Cantabria.
- Regional Federation of Municipalities and Provinces of Castilla y León, in the Autonomous Community of Castile and León.
- Federation of Municipalities and Provinces of Castilla-La Mancha, in the Autonomous Community of Castilla-La Mancha
- Federation of Municipalities of Catalonia, in the Autonomous Community of Catalonia.
- Federation of Municipalities and Provinces of Extremadura, in the Autonomous Community of Extremadura.
- Galician Federation of Municipalities and Provinces, in the Autonomous Community of Galicia.
- Federation of Municipalities of Madrid, in the Autonomous Community of Madrid.
- Federation of Municipalities of the Region of Murcia, in the Autonomous Community of Murcia.
- Navarrese Federation of Municipalities and Councils, in the Autonomous Community of Navarre.
- Riojan Federation of Municipalities, in the Autonomous Community of La Rioja.
- Association of Basque Municipalities-EUDEL, in the Autonomous community of the Basque Country.

With the reform of the procedure of voting of the census of Spanish residents abroad, the institutional participation in the local administration by the 2,406,611 Spanish citizens abroad is separated from the municipal elections and is channeled through its own mechanisms such as the Councils of Spanish Residents Abroad, thus generating the challenge of incorporating these Councils as other local Entities as full members of the Federation or in the case of the General Council of Spanish Citizenship Abroad as an Honor partner.

== Presidents of the FEMP ==
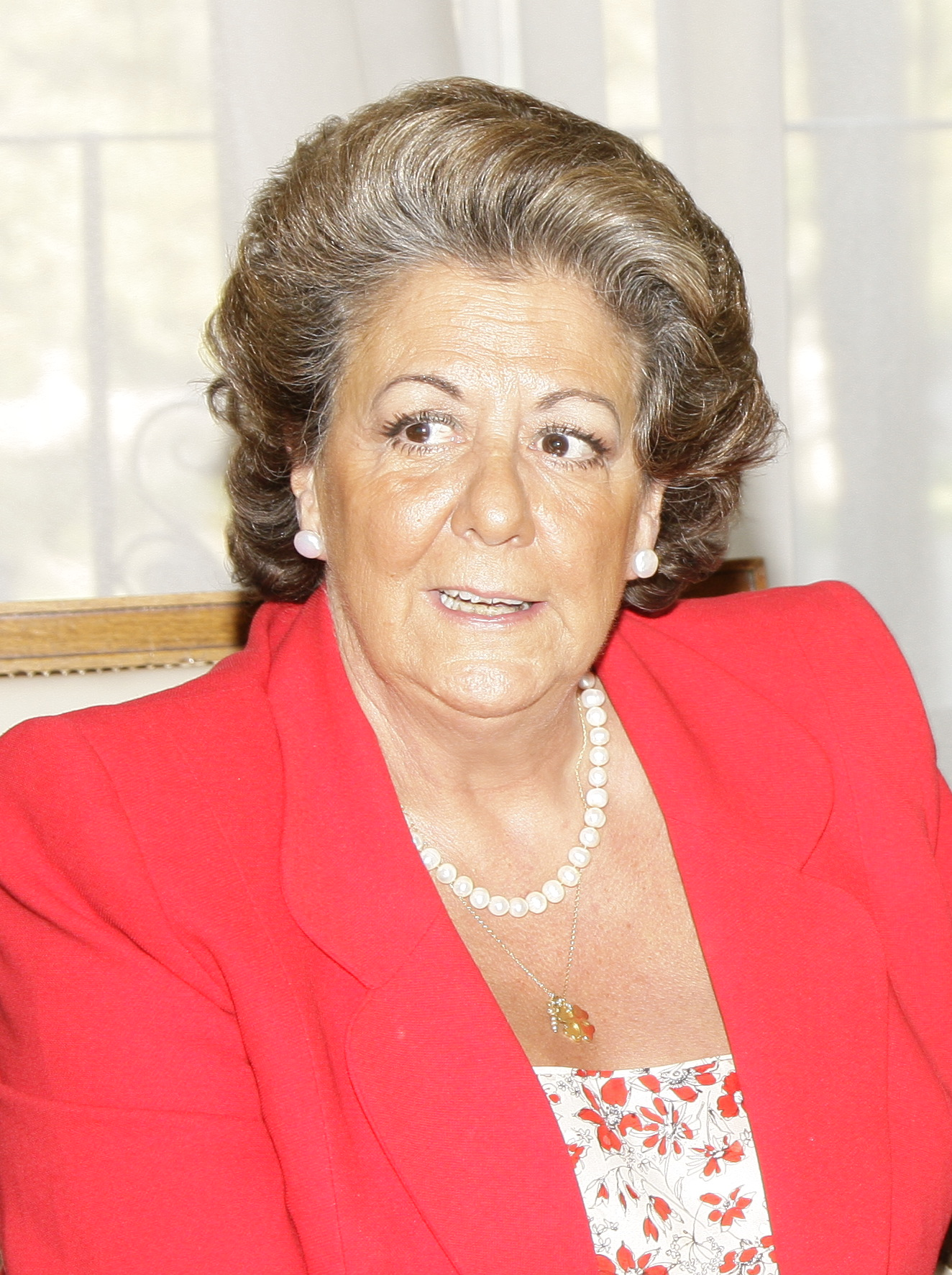
Rita Barberá,
Mayor of Valencia, PP

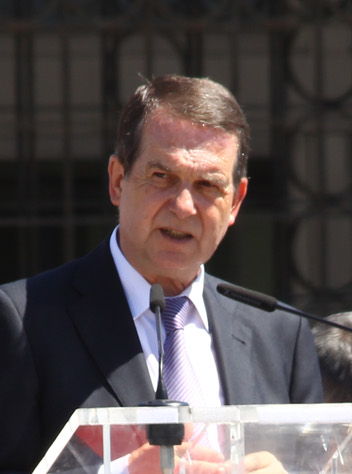
Abel Caballero,
Mayor of Vigo, PSOE

The presidents have been:

- Pedro Aparicio (1980–1983)
- Ramón Sainz de Varanda (1983–1985)
- Tomás Rodríguez Bolaños (1985–1991)
- Francisco Vázquez Vázquez (1991–1995)
- Rita Barberá (1995–2003)
- Francisco Vázquez Vázquez (2003–2006)
- Heliodoro Gallego (2006–2007)
- Pedro Castro Vázquez (2007–2011)
- Juan Ignacio Zoido (2011–2012)
- Íñigo de la Serna (2012–2015)
- Abel Caballero (2015–2023)
- María José García-Pelayo (2023–Present)
