= Villalbarba =

Coordinates: 41°36′N 5°13′W

Villalbarba, Spain
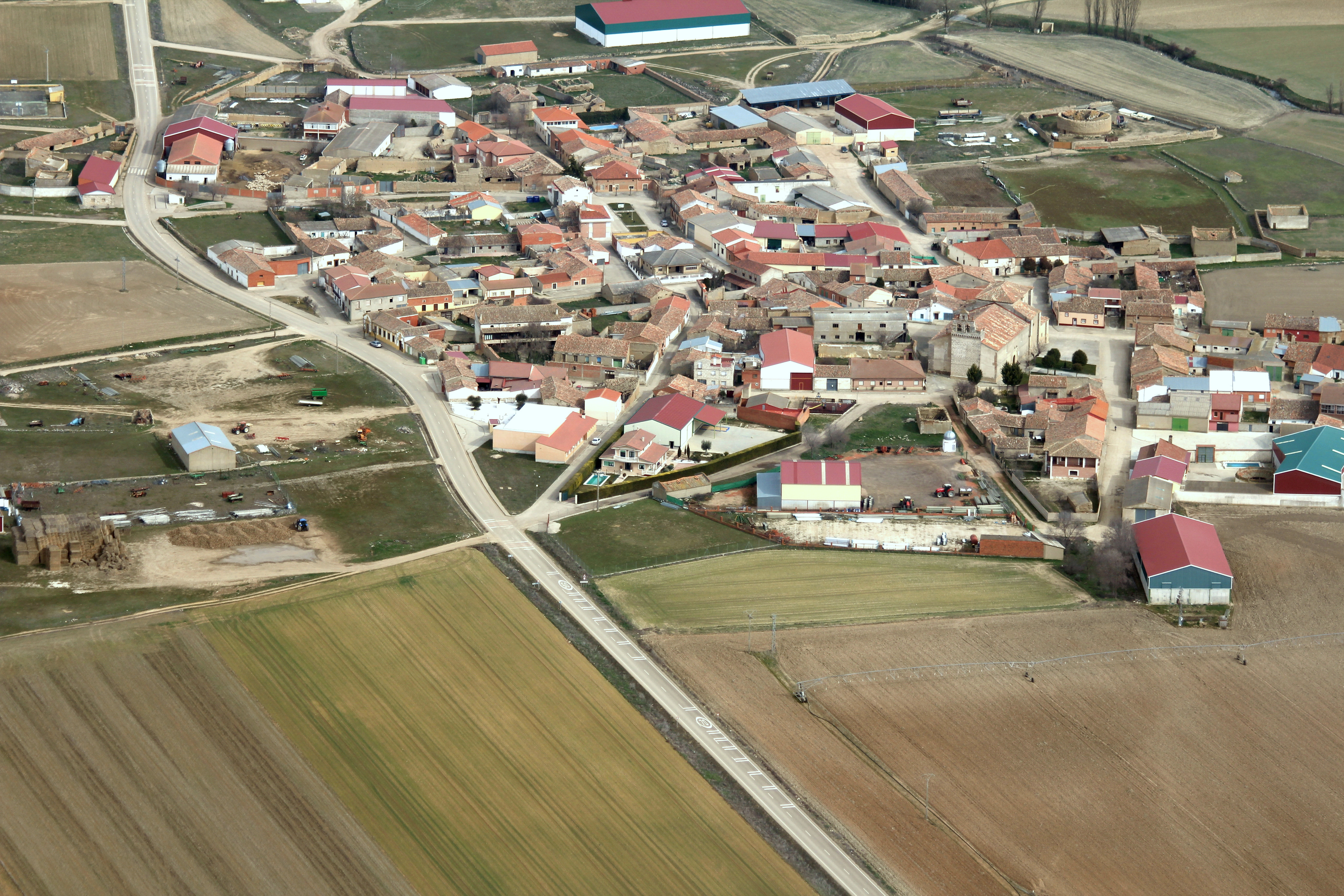
- View of Villalbarba

- Flag Coat of arms
- Interactive map of Villalbarba, Spain
- Country: Spain
- Autonomous community: Castile and León
- Province: Valladolid
- Municipality: Villalbarba

Area
  - Total: 21.98 km^{2} (8.49 sq mi)
- Elevation: 721 m (2,365 ft)

Population (2025-01-01)
  - Total: 96
  - Density: 4.4/km^{2} (11/sq mi)
- Time zone: UTC+1 (CET)
  - Summer (DST): UTC+2 (CEST)

Villalbarba is a municipality located in the province of Valladolid, Castile and León, Spain. According to the 2004 census (INE), the municipality had a population of 156 inhabitants.

== Notable person ==
- Heliodoro Gallego, politician
