= El Puente del Arzobispo =

- Municipality
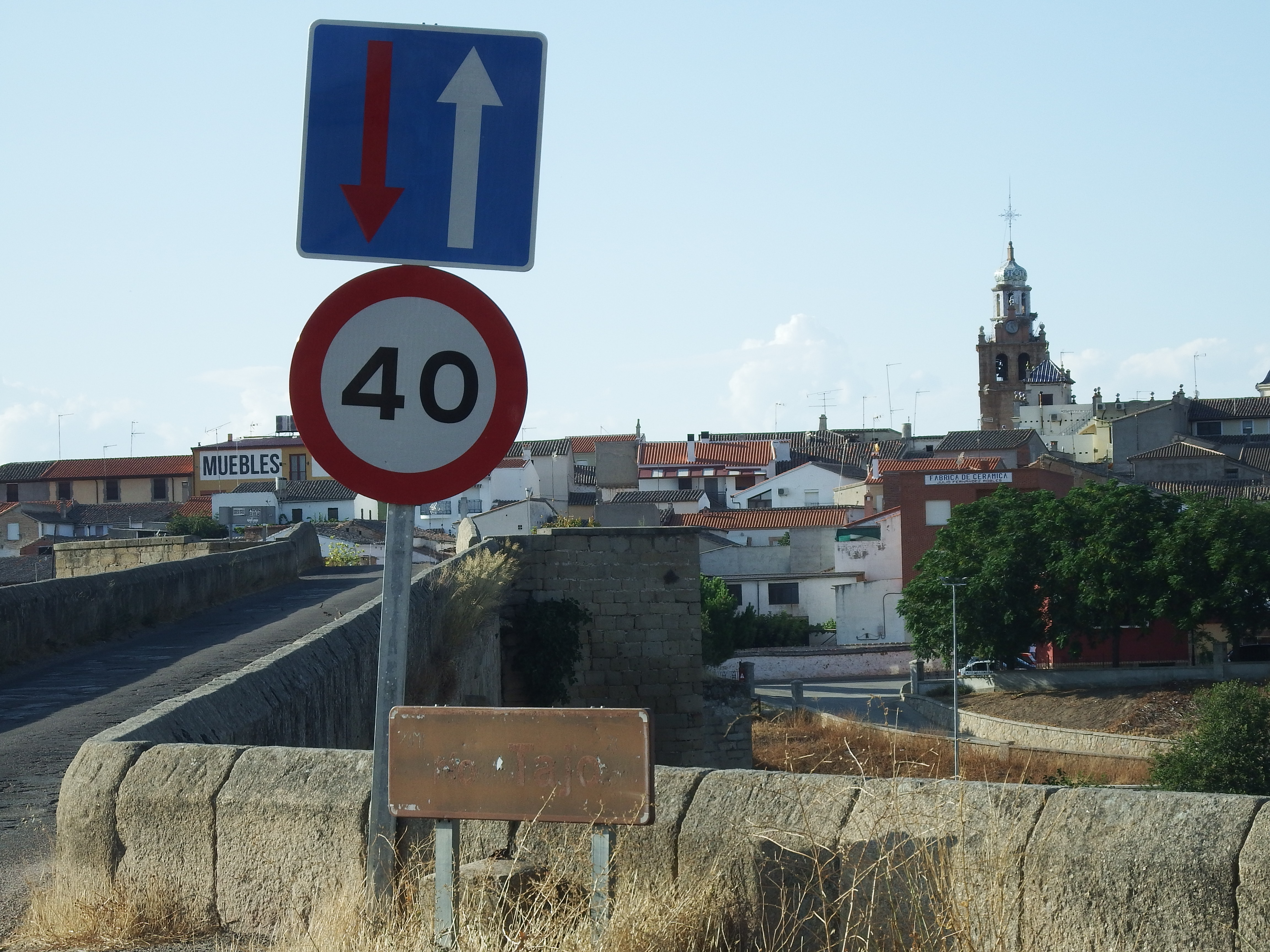

- Location in Spain El Puente del Arzobispo (Castilla-La Mancha)
- Coordinates: 39°48′N 5°10′W
- Country: Spain
- Autonomous community: Castilla–La Mancha
- Province: Toledo

Area
  - Total: 0.98 km^{2} (0.38 sq mi)
- Elevation: 320 m (1,050 ft)

Population (2025-01-01)
  - Total: 1,143
  - Density: 1,200/km^{2} (3,000/sq mi)
- Time zone: UTC+1 (CET)
  - Summer (DST): UTC+2 (CEST)

El Puente del Arzobispo is a municipality of Spain located in the province of Toledo, Castilla–La Mancha. The municipality spans across a total area of 0.98 km^{2} and, as of 1 January 2020, it has a registered population of 1,225. Together with neighbouring Talavera de la Reina, El Puente del Arzobispo was a producing centre of Maiolica pottery in Early-Modern Spain.

== History ==
Initiated towards 1380 or 1383 under the oversight of Archbishop of Toledo Pedro Tenorio, the bridge over the Tagus was already built by 1388. Housing developed in the bridge's vicinity. The archbishop granted rights for the collection of the tithe and the bridge toll to the newly born town, that otherwise also prospered thanks to the construction of gristmills.

Over the course of the 15th century and up until the 1492 expulsion, Villafranca de la Puente del Arzobispo (later El Puente del Arzobispo) hosted a small Jewish community. Some of the forcibly exiled Jews (who had moved to Portugal) soon returned as conversos. In 1495 the local synagogue and adjoining communal property were confirmed by the Crown as a grant to Pedro Sánchez de Valdemoro, who had earlier received them from Cardinal Pedro González de Mendoza.
