= Pedro Castro Vázquez =

Spanish politician

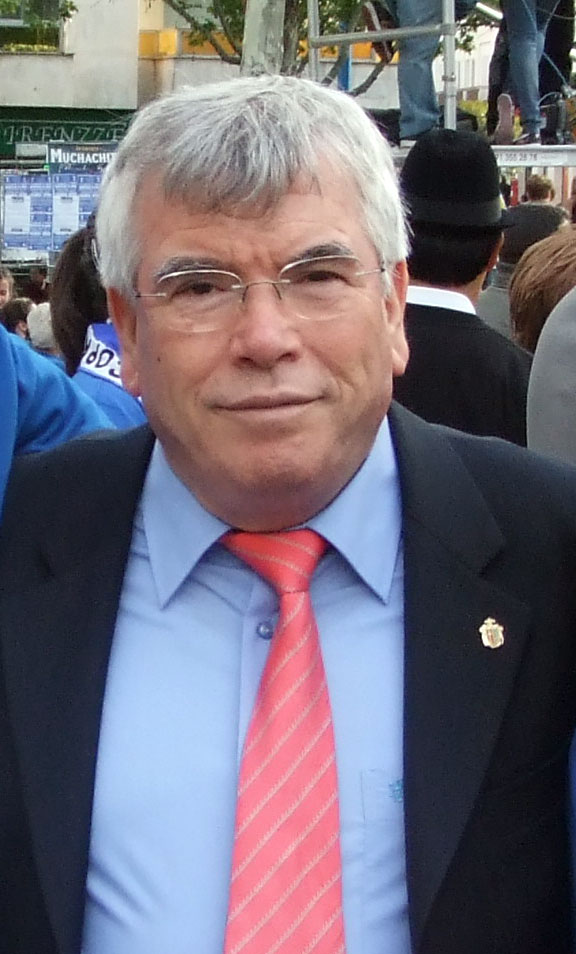
Castro in 2008

Pedro Castro Vázquez (born 12 February 1945) is a former Spanish Socialist Workers' Party (PSOE) politician. He was the mayor of Getafe in the Community of Madrid from 1983 to 2011, and the president of the Spanish Federation of Municipalities and Provinces (FEMP) from 2007 to 2011.

== Biography ==
Born in Tomelloso in the province of Ciudad Real, Castro is married and has three children. He was elected to Getafe City Council in the first democratic local elections in 1979, becoming deputy mayor to Jesús Prieto de la Fuente, and the councillor responsible for youth.

Castro was elected mayor in 1983, and served seven terms before being defeated by Juan Soler-Espiauba of the People's Party (PP) in 2011. He went on hunger strike to persuade prime minister of Spain Felipe González to build a hospital in Getafe, and in his final years achieved the construction of 10,000 homes, despite the Great Recession. He was known for his use of technology and communications: he had a radio call-in show for over 20 years and was an early user of Twitter, as well as writing a blog.

In 2002, Castro persuaded his former trade union colleague and local construction and nightlife businessman Ángel Torres to purchase the bankrupt football club Getafe CF. Within two years, the team was in La Liga for the first time, where they became a mainstay.

In August 2006, Castro requested that Getafe be the capital of the Community of Madrid instead of the city of Madrid, as Madrid is already the national capital. He likened the proposal to Santiago de Compostela and Mérida, which are the respective capitals of Galicia and Extremadura despite not being the largest cities. He mentioned the Charles III University of Madrid, the Roman Catholic Diocese of Getafe, Getafe CF and the importance of the local aeronautics industry as reasons for the move. Raúl Callé, mayor of nearby Leganés, ridiculed the proposal by suggesting that Castro apply for the capital of Pluto.

In 2007, Castro was elected president of the Spanish Federation of Municipalities and Provinces (FEMP) as the PSOE candidate with 15,997 votes, while the PP candidate Regina Otaola received 11,310. In December 2008, he publicly asked in a municipal meeting "why are there so many stupid people who still vote for the right?" The PP threatened to leave FEMP if Castro did not resign. In April 2009, the PP group in the Senate of Spain walked out of a parliamentary appearance by Castro.
