= Juan García Manrique =

Juan García Manrique (died 1416 in Coimbra) was a Castilian ecclesiastic and statesman.

He was the second son of García II Fernández Manrique de Lara, who was the fifth Lord of Amusco and chief governor of Castile, and of Urraca de Leyva.

He was archdeacon of Talavera and bishop of Orense under the protection of his paternal uncle, the Archbishop of Toledo, Gómez Manrique; Upon his death, a part of the Toledo council elected him to occupy the archdiocese of Toledo, while the other part opted for Pedro Cabeza de Vaca, but Pope Gregory XI resolved the dispute by appointing Pedro Tenorio to that purpose. Juan García Manrique then occupied the bishopric of Sigüenza, being at the same time chief chancellor of Kings Henry II and John I; from there he moved to the diocese of Burgos and from there he was promoted to the archbishopric of Santiago de Compostela, where he stood out as a leader in the armed conflicts that occurred during the crisis of 1383–1385.

At the end of the 14th century, having fallen out with the Toledo archbishop Pedro Tenorio and unhappy because the Castilian king Henry III had recognized the Avignon Papacy, he emigrated to Portugal, where with the mediation of the Portuguese king John I He was appointed Archbishop of Braga and Bishop of Coimbra.

Catholic Church titles
| Preceded by Juan Sierra | Bishop of Orense; 1370–1375 | Succeeded by Martín |
| Preceded by Juan de Salas | Bishop ofSigüenzaSalamanca; 1376–1381 | Succeeded by Juan de Castromocho |
| Preceded by Domingo de Arroyuelo | Bishop of Burgos; 1381–1382 | Succeeded by Gonzalo de Mena y Roelas |
| Preceded by Rodrigo de Moscoso | Archbishop of Santiago; 1383–1388 | Succeeded by Lope de Mendoza |
| Preceded by Lorenzo Vicente | Archbishop of Braga; 1397–1398 | Succeeded by Martín Alfonso de Miranda |
| Preceded by João Alfonso Esteves | Bishop of Coimbra; 1403–1407 | Succeeded by Gil Almada |
