= Almaluez =

- Municipality
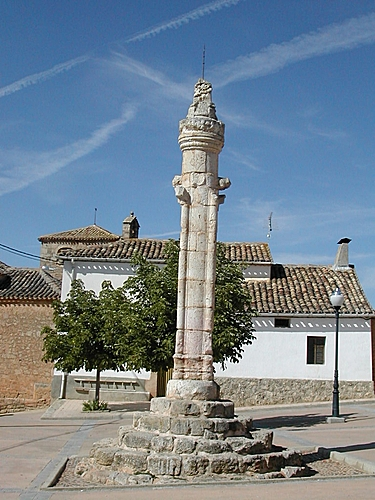

- Location in Spain. Almaluez (Spain)
- Country: Spain
- Autonomous community: Castile and León
- Province: Soria
- Municipality: Almaluez

Area
  - Total: 159.11 km^{2} (61.43 sq mi)
- Elevation: 823 m (2,700 ft)

Population (2025-01-01)
  - Total: 113
  - Density: 0.710/km^{2} (1.84/sq mi)
- Time zone: UTC+1 (CET)
  - Summer (DST): UTC+2 (CEST)

Almaluez is a town and municipality in Spain, located in the province of Soria, in the autonomous community of Castile-Leon, Spain.

== Geography and demography ==
The municipality has a population of 243 (2005), of which 128 are male and 115 are female. The area is 160 km^{2} and the density is 25.3. The altitude of the town is 822 msl.

== Local administration ==
The mayor of Almaluez is Mr. Santiago Bordejé Hernando of the (Partido Popular). This party has all seven councillors of the town's ayuntamiento.

== Elections ==
In the 2004 Spanish General Election, the Partido Popular got 73.9% of the vote in Almaluez, the Partido Socialista Obrero Español got 18.3%, Iniciativa por el Desarrollo de Soria got 5.6% and Izquierda Unida got .56%.
