= Ventura Pérez Mariño =

Spanish judge and politician (1948–2024)

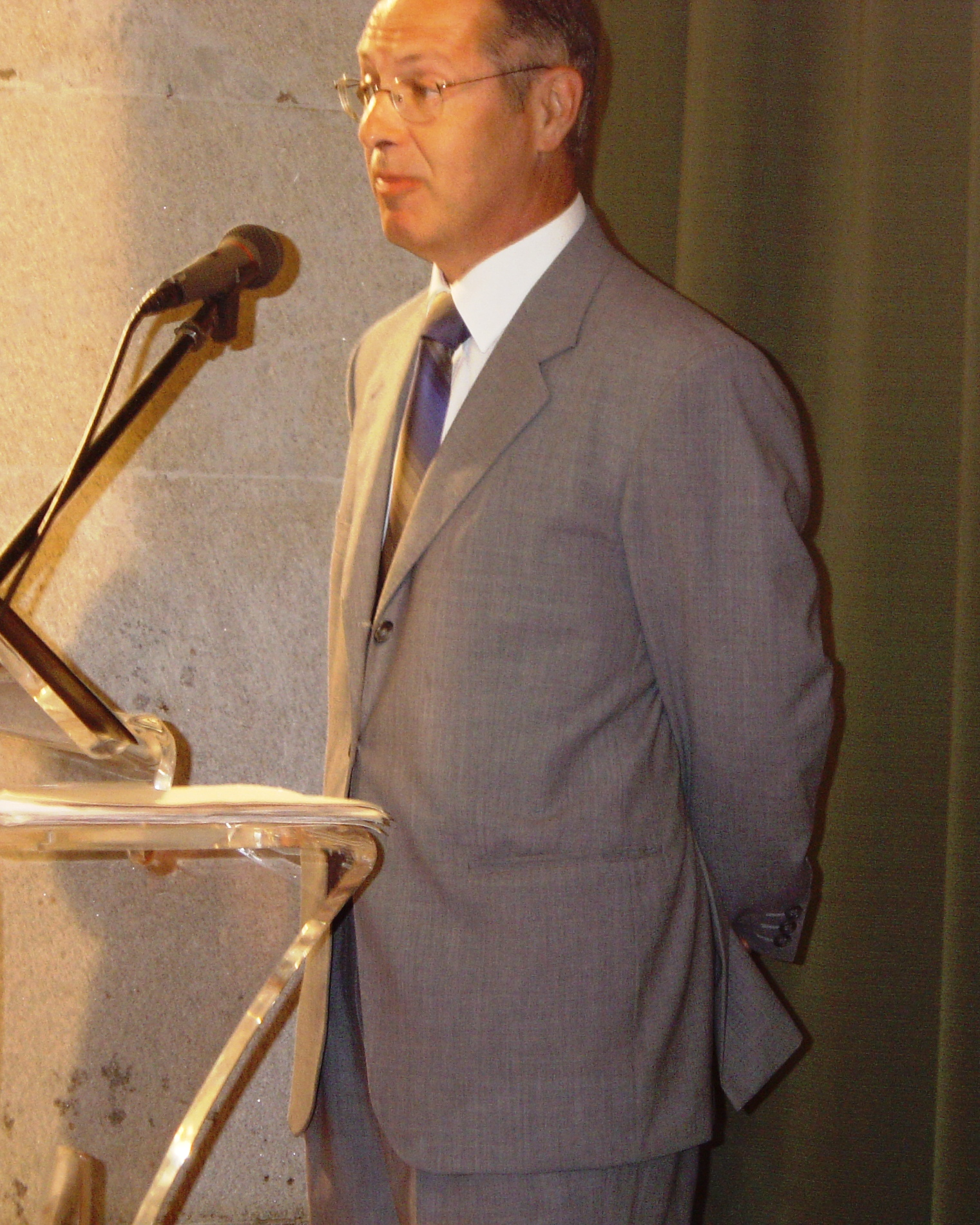
- Pérez Mariño in 2004

Personal details
- Born: 29 December 1948; Vigo, Spain
- Died: 14 February 2024 (aged 75); Vigo, Spain
- Political party: PSOE
- Occupation: Judge and politician

Ventura José Pérez Mariño (29 December 1948 – 14 February 2024) was a Spanish judge and Spanish Socialist Workers' Party (PSOE) politician. He was a member of the Congress of Deputies from 1993 to 1995, and a city councillor in Vigo from 2003 to 2005, serving as mayor for the first few weeks of his tenure.

== Biography ==
=== Early life and education ===
Ventura José Pérez Mariño was born on 29 December 1948, in Vigo. He studied with the Jesuits and then at ICADE, graduating with a law and business administration degree from the University of Deusto.

=== Legal and political career ===
Pérez Mariño was a judge in the Audiencia Nacional in Madrid. He oversaw such cases as those of the ETA militant Josu Urrutikoetxea, and of Manuel Charlín, head of the Los Charlines drug trafficking family. In May 1993, he was voluntarily removed from the judiciary so that he could contest in the general election. He was elected as the Spanish Socialist Workers' Party's (PSOE) list leader in Lugo. He and fellow magistrate Baltasar Garzón were persuaded into politics by PSOE prime minister Felipe González in order to give the party a moral image after scandals. Both became fiercely critical of González when it was revealed that his government had been covertly arming the anti-ETA paramilitary GAL in the 1980s. Garzón returned to his court to investigate the matter and in February 1995, Pérez Mariño resigned after publicly calling for González to do the same.

Returning to the judiciary, Pérez Mariño sentenced the banker Mario Conde to six years in jail for his misappropriation of 600 million pesetas from the Banesto bank. He then resigned from the court and opened a law firm in his home city. In April 2002, he returned to the PSOE to be their mayoral candidate in the following year's local elections. He was endorsed by party leader José Luis Rodríguez Zapatero. While the People's Party (PP) took 10 seats and his party took 8, his party formed a coalition with the Galician Nationalist Bloc (BNG) and he was installed as mayor of Vigo. In December, following disputes with the BNG leader Lois Pérez Castrillo, he was voted out in a motion of no confidence that made PP leader Corina Porro the new mayor. He quit his council seat and left politics for good in July 2005 for "strictly personal" reasons, returning to the judiciary; his party and the BNG then resumed their pact.

Following his exit from local politics, Pérez Mariño returned to the judiciary again, for 18 months in Catalonia and then in his hometown. He retired in 2013. He founded and led a charity that provided clean water to 200,000 people in the Mayo-Rey department of northern Cameroon.

=== Later life and death ===
His wife, Dolores Galovart, was also a judge. In August 2021, Pérez Mariño was hospitalised after nearly drowning at the beach in Aldán, Cangas. He lived the final years of his life with Parkinson's disease. He died on 14 February 2024, at the age of 75.
