= Corina Porro =

Spanish politician (born 1953)

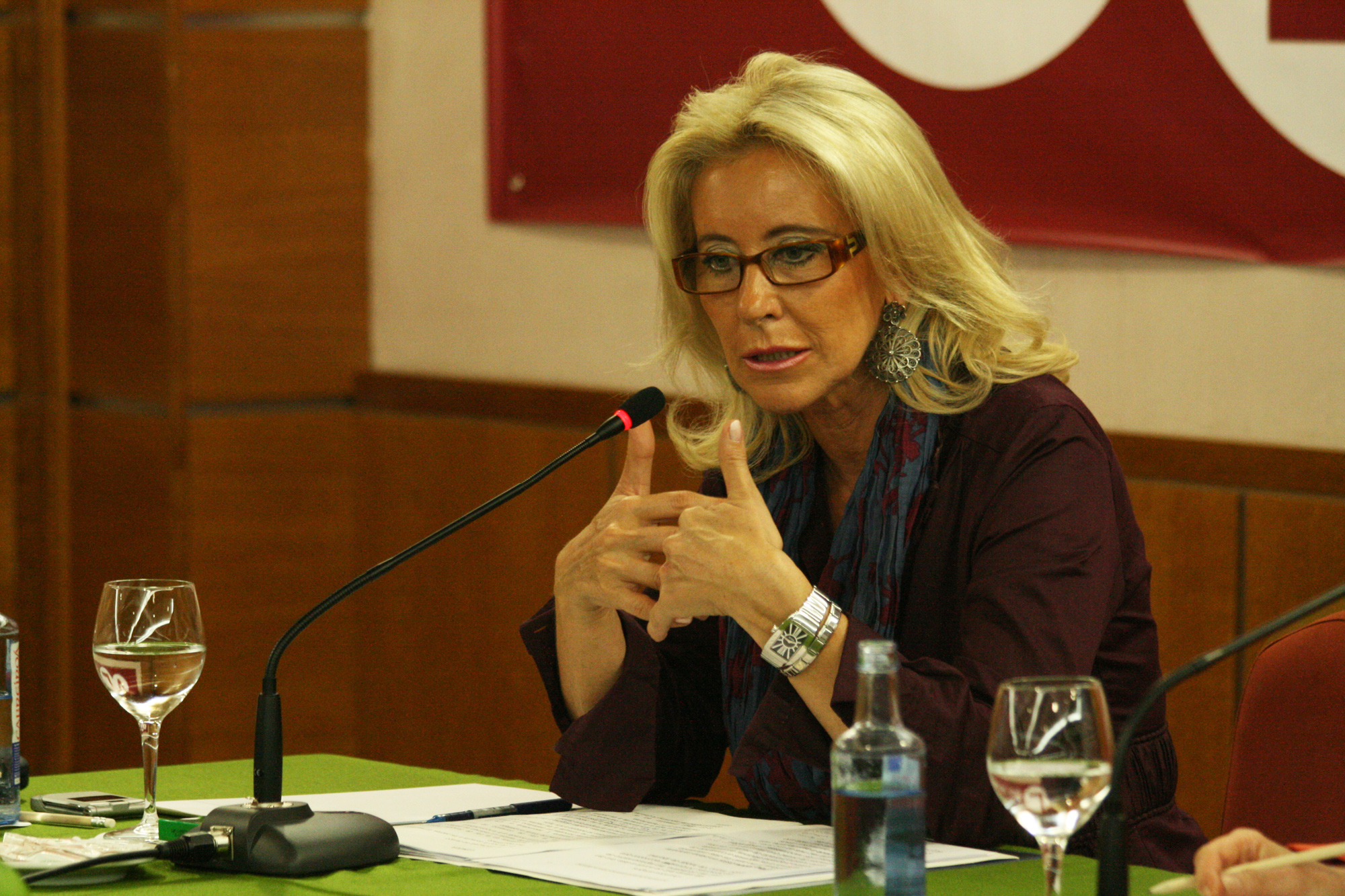
- Corina Porro (2011)

President of Vigo Port Authority
- Incumbent
- Assumed office 22 April 2009

Elected Senator for Pontevedra
- In office 9 March 2008 – 12 May 2009

Mayor of Vigo
- In office 2003–2007
- Preceded by: Ventura Pérez Mariño
- Succeeded by: Abel Caballero

Personal details
- Born: María Corina Porro Martínez; 1 December 1953 (age 72) Ferrol, Galicia, Spain
- Party: PPdeG
- Education: None.

María Corina Porro Martínez (born 1 December 1953) is a Spanish politician. She was a member of the Vigo local government with the Galician People's Party between 1995 and 1999. She was Chief Director of Social Services between 1999 and 2001. She became a deputy in the Parliament of Galicia and Councillor of Social Services in the 2002-2003 period. In 2003 Corina Porro was elected mayor of Vigo in 2003 after a censure motion against the socialist Ventura Pérez Mariño approved by 10 members from Galician People's Party and seven from Bloque Nacionalista Galego and rejected by eight members of Socialists' Party of Galicia and two from Progresistas Vigueses.

== See also ==
- Port of Vigo
