= Tomás Rodríguez Bolaños =

Spanish industrial technician and politician

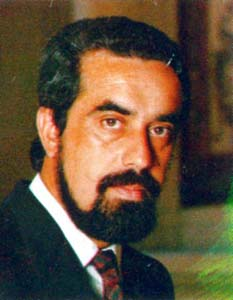

Tomás Rodríguez Bolaños (1 January 1944 – 2 November 2018) was a Spanish industrial technician and politician.

Rodríguez joined the Spanish Socialist Workers' Party in 1975 and was mayor of Valladolid from 1979 to 1995. His mayoralty overlapped with his tenure as member of the Cortes of Castile and León between 1983 and 1987, as well as his term as president of the Spanish Federation of Municipalities and Provinces from 1985 to 1991. Rodríguez was first elected to the Congress of Deputies in 1993, and served until 2004, when he contested a seat on the Senate, on which he served one four-year term.

He died of a heart attack at the age of 74, while visiting San Juan de Gaztelugatxe on 2 November 2018. The city of Valladolid posthumously awarded Rodríguez the status of Hijo Predilecto de la ciudad and the Medalla de Oro. FEMP honored him with its Llave de Oro del Municipalismo.
