= Recas =

Coordinates: 40°03′N 3°59′W

- Municipality
- Flag Coat of arms
- Interactive map of Recas
- Country: Spain
- Autonomous community: Castilla–La Mancha
- Province: Toledo

Area
  - Total: 31 km^{2} (12 sq mi)
- Elevation: 571 m (1,873 ft)

Population (2025-01-01)
  - Total: 5,037
  - Density: 160/km^{2} (420/sq mi)
- Time zone: UTC+1 (CET)
  - Summer (DST): UTC+2 (CEST)

Recas is a municipality located in the province of Toledo, Castilla–La Mancha, Spain. According to the 2006 census (INE), the municipality has a population of 3138 inhabitants.

The placename is either suggested to be a hydronym of Vasconic origin (from Erraka, 'creek') or derived from Arabic Rakab, via archaic latinized variant Requas.

The village is sometimes referred to as La pequeña Mali ('Little Mali') owing to the substantial share of the population with origins in Mali.
