= Abel Caballero =

Spanish politician (born 1946)

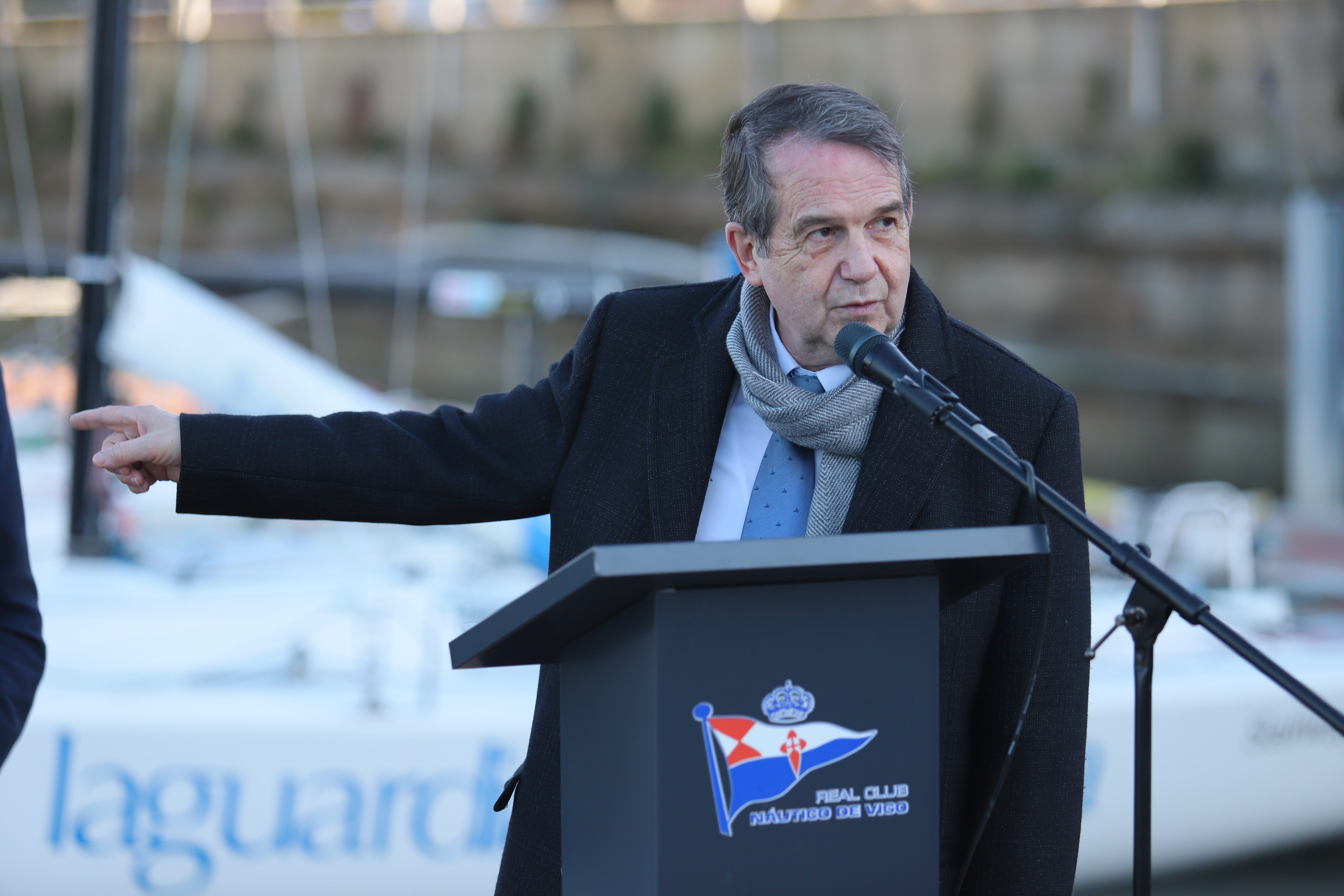

Mayor of Vigo
- Incumbent
- Assumed office June 16, 2007
- Preceded by: Corina Porro

Minister of Transport
- In office July 6, 1985 – July 9, 1988
- Monarch: Juan Carlos I
- Prime Minister: Felipe González
- Preceded by: Enrique Barón
- Succeeded by: José Barrionuevo

Member of the Congress of Deputies
- In office 28 October 1982 – 23 April 1986
- Constituency: A Coruña

Personal details
- Born: Abel Ramón Caballero Álvarez; September 2, 1946 (age 80) Ponteareas, Galicia, Spain
- Party: PSdeG-PSOE
- Education: University of Santiago de Compostela
- Occupation: Mayor
- Profession: Professor

Abel Ramón Caballero Álvarez (born 2 September 1946) is a Spanish professor of Economics and since June 2007, the current mayor of Vigo, representing PSdeG-PSOE. Since 19 September 2015, he has also served as the president of the Spanish Federation of Municipalities and Provinces (FEMP).

Caballero had previously served in the Spanish Congress of Deputies representing A Coruña Province from 1982 to 1986 and Pontevedra Province from 1986 to 1997.
