= Manoel Soto =

Spanish politician (1944–2019)

Manoel Soto Ferreiro (6 April 1944 – 27 November 2019) was a Spanish Socialist Workers' Party (PSOE) politician. He was the first democratically elected mayor of Vigo in Galicia from 1979 to 1991.

== Biography ==
Born in Ourense, Soto was a founder of the Socialists' Party of Galicia (PSdeG). In the first democratic local elections in April 1979, his party came second to the Union of the Democratic Centre (UCD) but governed through a coalition with three other left-wing parties, making him mayor.

In the 1980s, Soto reformed the industrial city with new sculptures and projects, such as renovation of the Balaídos stadium for the 1982 FIFA World Cup. He sympathised with the Movida viguesa youth music and arts movement during the decade. He and his administration locked themselves in the city hall during the neo-Francoist 1981 Spanish coup d'état attempt.

Soto served three terms as mayor, all in coalition. He often clashed with Manuel Fraga, the right-wing President of the Regional Government of Galicia, over investment. In 1991, he stepped aside for Carlos Príncipe as part of an agreement with the Galician Left (EG) and Galician Nationalist Bloc (BNG). His own party Progresistas Vigueses earned seats in opposition in 1999 and 2003, and his reconstituted Partido Galeguista Demócrata was unsuccessful.

In his final years, Soto was a political pundit on local channel Televigo. He died of lung cancer at the age of 75. His funeral was attended by incumbent mayor Abel Caballero.
