= Francisco Vázquez Vázquez =

Spanish politician

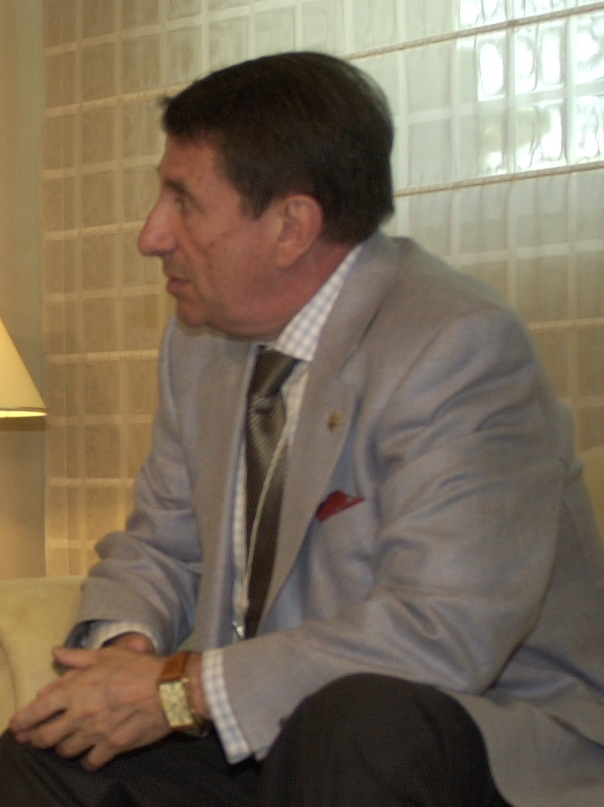

Francisco José Vázquez Vázquez (born 9 April 1946) is a Spanish politician who represented the Socialists' Party of Galicia. He was mayor of his hometown of A Coruña from 1983 to 2006, and also served in the Parliament of Galicia and both chambers of the Cortes Generales. From 2006 to 2011, he was Spain's ambassador to the Holy See. Vázquez, who holds socially conservative beliefs, later left the Spanish Socialist Workers' Party due to differences in ideology.

== Career ==
Vázquez opposed the 1994 Galician Supreme Court decision that made place names in the Galician language official, opining that he should be allowed to use the Spanish-language name La Coruña when speaking Spanish, as the region is bilingual. In 2008 he was cleared of wrongdoing in court after being sued for this, with the court sharing his reasoning.

In February 2006, Vázquez was chosen by prime minister José Luis Rodríguez Zapatero to be Spain's ambassador to the Holy See. According to El País, Vázquez – a practicing Catholic who opposes abortion and gay marriage – was chosen to improve Spain's then fracturous relations with the Vatican. He resigned five years later.

Vázquez left the Spanish Socialist Workers' Party due to his opposition to the Law of Historical Memory, which he considers to have broken the reconciliation of the Spanish transition to democracy: "we were all victims and killers at the same time. To whoever says Paracuellos (site of a Republican massacre) to you, you can respond with Badajoz (site of a Nationalist massacre), and vice versa"; he also said the party "stops being social-democratic and sinks when it flies unrelated flags like ecology and gender ideology". From November 2018, he campaigned with Albert Rivera, leader of Citizens.

== Personal life ==
Vázquez's love of comic books has been documented. He was one of two creators of the Viñetas desde el Atlántico ("Comics from the Atlantic") festival in his hometown, and owns one of the biggest private collections in Spain.
