= Ordinariate for the Faithful of Eastern Rite in Spain =

Eastern Catholic jurisdiction in Spain

Ordinariate for the Faithful of Eastern Rite in Spain Ordinariatus pro christifidelibus orientalibus in Hispania degentibus

Location
- Country: Spain

Information
- Established: 9 June 2016

Current leadership
- Pope: Leo XIV
- Bishop: José Cobo Cano

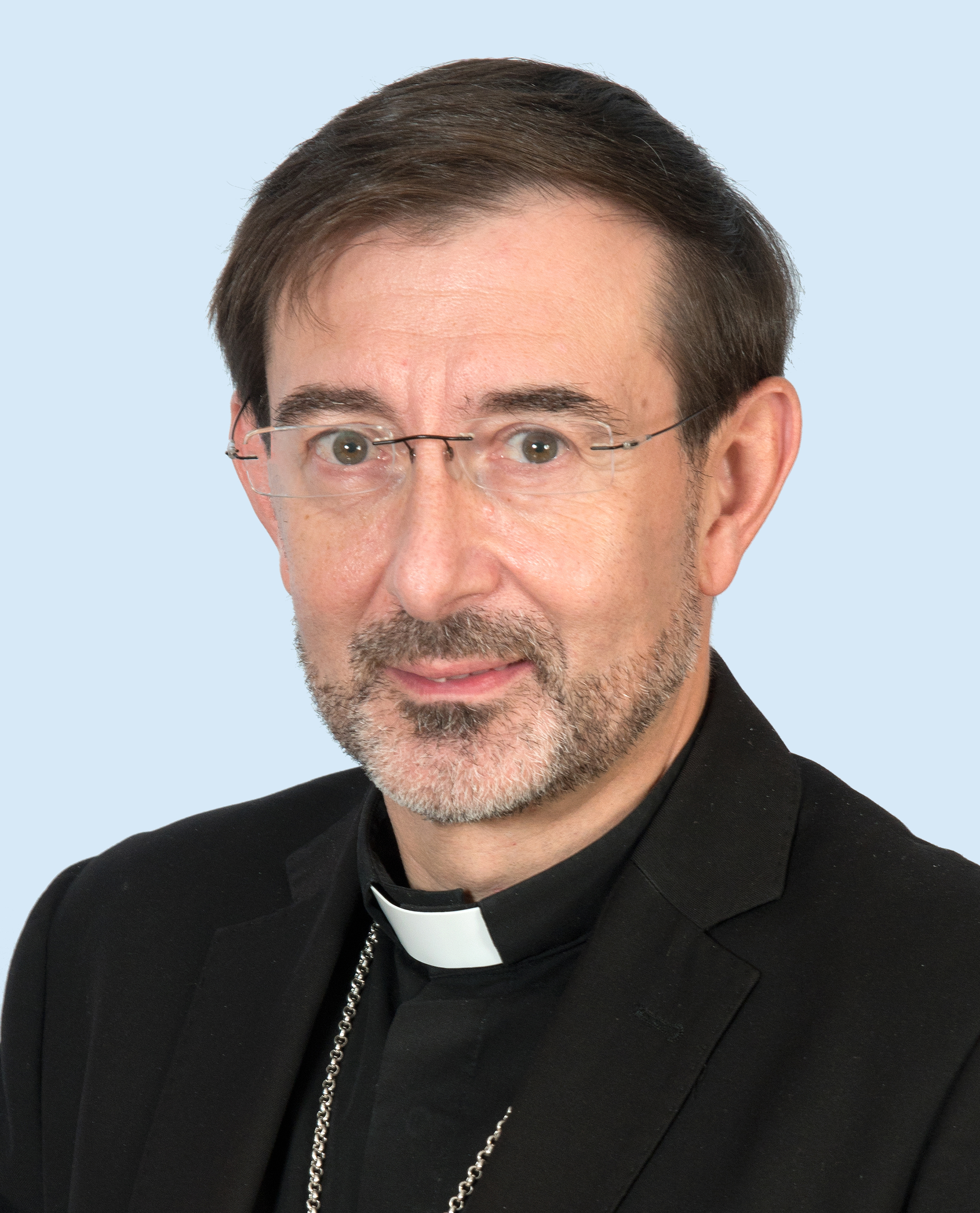
José Cobo Cano, ordinary to the Eastern Catholic faithful in Spain.

The Ordinariate for the Faithful of Eastern Rite in Spain is an Ordinariate (pseudo-diocese) for all non-Latin Catholic faithful living in Spain who belong to the particular Churches sui iuris of any Eastern rite immediately subject to the Holy See.

== History ==
It was erected on 9 June 2016 by Pope Francis, who also named the then Archbishop of Madrid, Carlos Osoro Sierra, as its first Ordinary.

Its creation was a response to the increase of Eastern Catholics in Spanish territory, until then spiritually assisted by the various local dioceses. The Spanish Episcopal Conference already had a pastoral care department for the faithful of oriental rites, who in 2003 drew up the document Orientations for the pastoral care of Eastern Catholics in Spain.

The Ordinariate has jurisdiction over all the Catholic faithful of the Eastern rites who live in Spain and may appoint vicars general, having appointed the presbyter Andrés Martínez Esteban for that position. Like the Ordinariate for Eastern Catholics in France, the Ordinary has a personal jurisdiction over the Eastern faithful that is cumulative with the diocesan bishops, from whom he must obtain consent for the decisions that pertain to their respective dioceses, and that retain secondary jurisdiction in minor matters (unlike other oriental ordinariates in what the ordinary has full jurisdiction). It must also require the consent of the primate and synods of the Eastern Churches in the decisions that involve them and obtain from them the clergy of the Ordinariate.

Between May 2 and 4, 2017 the ordinary met with the priests of the three Eastern rites present in Spain to advance in the constitution of the Ordinariate.

On March 1, 2024, Pope Francis named José Cobo Cano as new Ordinary.

== Territory ==
The Ordinariate has jurisdiction over the Catholic faithful of all Eastern rites living in Spain. Its seat is the city of Madrid.

=== Eastern Catholic communities in Spain ===
Eastern Catholics in Spain are mainly from the Ukrainian Greek-Catholic Church and from the Romanian Greek Catholic Church, both of Byzantine rite. There are also communities of the Syro Malabar Catholic Church. A small Coptic Catholic community that existed in Spain no longer existed at the time of the erection of the Ordinariate, as its faithful migrated to other European countries.

==== Romanian Greek-Catholic Church ====
On March 16, 2009, the Cardinal and Archbishop of Madrid Antonio Maria Rouco Varela appointed the priest Bogdan Vasile Buda as chaplain responsible for the Romanian community of Byzantine rite residing in the archdiocese of Madrid. In April 2009 he assigned a chapel of the parish of Our Lady of Sorrows in Madrid for the pastoral care of the Romanian faithful of the Byzantine rite of his archdiocese. The community is called Capelania Greco-Catolică din Madrid Botezul Domnului (Baptism of the Lord). On March 1, 2012, Bogdan Vasile Buda was named archpriest (protopop) by the Cardinal Primate of the Romanian Greek Catholic Church, Lucian Mureşan, and by the archiepiscopal major synod, becoming the national leader of the Romanian Greek Catholic faithful and priests of Spain (Greco-Romanian Catholic Deanery (arciprestazgo) of Madrid).

The archpriest has 8 priests serving two parishes and 6 chaplaincies:

- Diocese of Orihuela-Alicante: the chaplaincy is in the church of San Roque in Alicante, with masses once a month in the church of San Pedro and San Pablo de Torrevieja
- Diocese of Almería: chaplaincy in the church of the Holy Family of Almería (Sfânta Familie)
- Diocese of Ciudad Real: in the church of the Remedios of Ciudad Real
- Archdiocese of Granada: existing since 2006, the priest serves in the communities of Castell de Ferro (parish church Nuestra Señora del Carmen), Motril (in the church of Carmen) and Granada (in the Virgen del Carmen church, which has a pastoral with gypsies)
- Diocese of Mallorca: a community in the Oratory of San Telm in Palma de Mallorca
- Diocese of Calahorra and La Calzada-Logroño: Romanian Greek Catholic parish of San Nicolás in Calahorra (Parohia Greco-Catolică Română Sfântul Nicolae)
- Diocese of León: the Romanian Greek Catholic parish of León (Pogorârea Sfântului Spirit, in the church of the Railway Orphans of León and in the chapel of Caritas Diocesana de Benavente).

Minor communities without a resident priest exist in the dioceses of Alcalá de Henares, Getafe and Zamora.

==== Ukrainian Greek-Catholic Church ====
Ukrainian Greek Catholic communities have two parishes (Barcelona and Huelva) and 23 priests in 14 Spanish dioceses:

- Diocese of Albacete
- Diocese of Almería: community of Campohermoso
- Archdiocese of Barcelona: personal parish of Sant Josep, Santa Mònica and Sant Josafat
- Diocese of Cádiz and Ceuta
- Diocese of Cartagena: community of Murcia
- Diocese of Córdoba
- Diocese of Cuenca
- Diocese of Gerona
- Archdiocese of Granada: in the parish of Santo Ángel Custodio
- Diocese of Huelva: have since 2015 in the parish of Saints Cyril and Methodius its own temple on which depends the community of Seville (also with its own temple, the church of the Sisters of Mary Repairing)
- Diocese of Lleida
- Archdiocese of Madrid: Ukrainian chaplaincy with headquarters in the parish of Our Lady of Good Success with 2000 parishioners, on which the chaplaincies depend in the parishes of Santa Teresa de Jesus de Getafe and Virgen de Belén de Alcalá de Henares
- Diocese of Málaga
- Diocese of Mallorca: Ukrainian chaplaincy in the church of Santa Fe in Palma de Mallorca
- Diocese of Orihuela-Alicante: community in Torrevieja
- Archdiocese of Pamplona
- Diocese of Solsona
- Archdiocese of Tarragona
- Diocese of Urgell
- Archdiocese of Valencia
- Diocese of Vic: communities in Torelló and in Vic
- Diocese of Vitoria
- Archdiocese of Zaragoza

Bishop Hlib Lonchyna was apostolic visitor for Ukrainian Greek Catholics in Spain from March 4, 2004, until January 7, 2009. He was succeeded since January 19, 2009 by the titular bishop of Egnazia, Dionisio Lachovicz, as apostolic visitor in Italy and Spain, appointed by Pope Benedict XVI and based in Rome. In 2009 it was estimated that in Spain there were 42,000 faithful in 45 communities of Ukrainians of Byzantine rite, attended by 17 priests.

==== Syro-Malabar Catholic Church ====
In Madrid there is the Syro Malabar community of Saint Thomas, with 80 members and a priest since 2009, and four other communities in Barcelona, Granada, Toledo and Valladolid, which together another 120 worshipers, ten priests and four nuns.

== Ordinaries ==
- Carlos Osoro Sierra (since 2016.06.09)
