= Provincia Eclesiástica de Madrid =

Catholic ecclesiastical province in Spain

Ecclesiastical province of Madrid, formed by the Archdiocese of Madrid and his dioceses of Getafe and Alcalá

The Ecclesiastical province of Madrid constitutes one of the 14 ecclesiastical provinces in Spain. It is constituted by the Archdiocese of Madrid and his two Dioceses: The Diocese of Alcalá and the Diocese of Getafe.

This formed after the desmembración of the archdiocese in 1991 with the publication of the Bula of the Pope John Paul II.

The creation of these two new diocese had to the big demographic growth of the Archdiocese of Madrid that, at the beginning of the years 1990 arrived already to the 5 million inhabitants, of which around 90% are considered Catholics.

The archdiocese was supported by its archbishop, the Cardinal Angél Suquia Goicoechea. Each diocese happened to have its own bishop, being the first of the one of Alcalá Manuel Ureña Pastor and the first of Getafe Francisco José Pérez and Fernández-Golfín.

The current archbishop and bishops are: Carlos Osoro in the archdiocese, Juan Antonio Reig Pla in Alcalá and Joaquín María López de Ándujar y Cánovas del Castillo in Getafe.
