= Archdiocese of Madrid =

Latin Catholic archdiocese in Spain

Coordinates: 40.4156°N 3.7146°W

Metropolitan Archdiocese of Madrid Archidioecesis Metropolitae Matritensis Archidiócesis Metropolitana de Madrid

Catholic

Location
- Country: Spain
- Ecclesiastical province: Madrid

Statistics
- Area: 3,663 km^{2} (1,414 sq mi)
- Population: Total; Catholics: (as of 2019); 4,146,225; 3,316,800 (80%)

Information
- Denomination: Catholic
- Sui iuris church: Latin Church
- Rite: Roman Rite
- Established: 7 March 1885 as the Diocese of Madrid; 25 March 1964 as the Archdiocese of Madrid; 23 July 1991 as the Metropolitan Archdiocese of Madrid
- Cathedral: Cathedral of Our Lady of Almudena in Madrid

Current leadership
- Pope: Leo XIV
- Metropolitan Archbishop: José Cobo Cano
- Suffragans: Diocese of Alcalá de Henares; Diocese of Getafe
- Auxiliary Bishops: Juan Antonio Martínez Camino; Vicente Martín Muñoz
- Bishops emeritus: Antonio Rouco Varela; Carlos Osoro Sierra

Map

Website
- Website of the Archdiocese

The Metropolitan Archdiocese of Madrid (Latin: Archidioecesis Metropolitae Matritensis) is a Latin archdiocese of the Catholic Church in Spain. It is one of Spain's fourteen metropolitan archbishoprics. Since 12 June 2023 the archbishop of Madrid has been José Cobo Cano.

Although Madrid has been the seat of the Spanish Crown since 1561, the diocese was only created in the late 19th century and gained the status of an archdiocese in 1991. Its cathedral archiepiscopal see is the Catedral de Santa María la Real de la Almudena, in Spain's national capital Madrid. The metropolitan city area also has several minor basilicas: the Basílica Ex-Catedral de San Isidro (the former pro-cathedral), the Basílica de San Lorenzo (a World Heritage Site, in El Escorial), the Basílica de la Asunción de Nuestra Señora (dedicated to the Assumption, in Colmenar Viejo), the Basílica de la Concepción de Nuestra Señora, the Basílica de Nuestro Padre Jesús de Medinaceli, the Basílica de San Vicente de Paul (Milagrosa), the Basílica de Santa Cruz (dedicated to the Holy Cross, in El Valle de los Caídos), the Basílica Pontificia de San Miguel, the Real Basílica de Nuestra Señora de Atocha (royal, a National Shrine), the Real Basílica de San Francisco el Grande (also royal).

== History ==
It was founded on 7 March 1885 by Pope Leo XIII as the Diocese of Madrid y Alcalá de Henares / Matriten(sis) et Compluten(sis) (Latin adjective), on canonical territory split off from the Metropolitan Archdiocese of Toledo. It was made the Archdiocese of Madrid on 25 March 1964 by Pope Paul VI. Pope John Paul II gave the Archdiocese Metropolitan status on 23 July 1991, while creating two suffragan dioceses split off from its territory: Getafe and Alcalá de Henares. The archdiocese hosted papal visits from Pope John Paul II (1982.10, 1982.11, 1993.06, 2003.05) and Pope Benedict XVI (August 2011).

On 20 January 2021, a large explosion damaged Our Lady of Paloma parish in downtown Madrid, and killed four men, including a parishioner and a priest of the parish, Ruben Perez Ayala. Perez had been ordained to the priesthood six months before. The explosion was caused by a gas leak in a boiler which the parishioner, David Santos Munoz, an electrician, had been called to inspect.

== Statistics ==
As per 2014, it pastorally served 3,553,000 Catholics (86.7% of 4,099,700 total) on 3,663 km^{2} in 482 parishes and 108 missions with 3,107 priests (1,417 diocesan, 1,690 religious), 31 deacons, 9,082 lay religious (2,245 brothers, 6,837 sisters) and 204 seminarians.

== Ecclesiastical province ==
The Ecclesiastical province of Madrid consists of the Archdiocese of Madrid and its two Dioceses. Its only suffragan sees are its daughters :

- Roman Catholic Diocese of Getafe
- Roman Catholic Diocese of Alcalá de Henares

== Ordinaries ==
Suffragan Bishops of Madrid

- Narciso Martínez Izquierdo (27 Mar 1884 – death 18 Apr 1886), previously Bishop of Salamanca (Spain) (16 Jan 1874 – 27 Mar 1884) and Apostolic Administrator of Diocese of Ciudad Rodrigo (Spain) (16 Jan 1874 – 27 Mar 1884)
- Ciriaco María Sancha y Hervás (10 Jun 1886 – 11 Jul 1892), previously Titular Bishop of Areopolis (28 Jan 1876 – 27 Mar 1882) as Auxiliary Bishop of Archdiocese of Toledo (Spain) (28 Jan 1876 – 27 Mar 1882), Bishop of Ávila (Spain) (27 Mar 1882 – 10 Jun 1886); later Metropolitan Archbishop of Valencia (Spain) (11 Jul 1892 – 24 Mar 1898), created Cardinal-Priest of S. Pietro in Montorio (2 Dec 1895 – death 25 Feb 1909), Latin Patriarch of Indias Occidentales (24 Mar 1898 – 25 Feb 1909), Metropolitan Archbishop of Archdiocese of Toledo (Spain) (24 Mar 1898 – 25 Feb 1909)
- Archbishop-bishop Jose María Cos y Macho (11 Jun 1892 – 18 Apr 1901), previously Bishop of Mondoñedo (Spain) (10 Jun 1886 – 14 Feb 1889), Metropolitan Archbishop of Santiago de Cuba (Cuba) (14 Feb 1889 – 11 Jun 1892); later Metropolitan Archbishop of Valladolid (Spain) (18 Apr 1901 – death 17 Dec 1919), created Cardinal-Priest of S. Maria del Popolo (2 Dec 1912 – 17 Dec 1919)
- Victoriano Guisasola y Menendez (16 Dec 1901 – 14 Dec 1905), previously Bishop of Osma (Spain) (15 Jun 1893 – 19 Apr 1897), Bishop of Jaén (Spain) (19 Apr 1897 – 16 Dec 1901); later Metropolitan Archbishop of Valencia (Spain) (14 Dec 1905 – 1 Jan 1914), Latin Patriarch of the West Indies (1 Jan 1914 – 2 Sep 1920), Metropolitan Archbishop of Archdiocese of Toledo (Spain) (1 Jan 1914 – death 2 Sep 1920), created Cardinal-Priest of Ss. Quattro Coronati (8 Sep 1914 – 2 Sep 1920)
- José Maria Salvador y Barrera (14 Dec 1905 – 14 Dec 1916), previously Bishop of Tarazona (Spain) (16 Dec 1901 – 14 Dec 1905) and Apostolic Administrator of Diocese of Tudela (Spain) (16 Dec 1901 – 14 Dec 1905); later Metropolitan Archbishop of Valencia (Spain) (14 Dec 1916 – death 4 Sep 1919)
- Prudencio Melo y Alcalde (4 Dec 1916 – 14 Dec 1922), previously Titular Bishop of Olympus (19 Dec 1907 – 18 Jul 1913) as Auxiliary Bishop of Archdiocese of Toledo (Spain) (19 Dec 1907 – 18 Jul 1913), Bishop of Vitoria (Spain) (18 Jul 1913 – 4 Dec 1916); later Metropolitan Archbishop of Valencia (Spain) (14 Dec 1922 – death 31 Oct 1945), Apostolic Administrator of Diocese of Segorbe (Spain) (1940 – 10 Aug 1944)
- Leopoldo Eijo y Garay (14 Dec 1922 – 31 Jul 1963), previously Bishop of Tui (Spain) (28 May 1914 – 22 Mar 1917), Bishop of Vitoria (Spain) (22 Mar 1917 – 14 Dec 1922); later Latin Patriarch of Indias Occidentales (21 Jul 1946 – death 31 Jul 1963)
  - Auxiliary Bishop: Father José Solé y Mercadé (29 Aug 1925 – 1925.11), no titular/other prelature
  - Auxiliary Bishop of Madrid (25 Jan 1943 – 13 May 1950), Titular Bishop of Agathopolis (25 Jan 1943 – 13 May 1950), next Bishop of Bilbao (Spain) (13 May 1950 – 21 Sep 1955), Metropolitan Archbishop of Zaragoza (Spain) (21 Sep 1955 – 27 Mar 1964), Undersecretary of Central Commission for the Coordination of the Postconciliar Work and the Interpretation of Conciliar Resolutions (1962 – 1967)
  - Auxiliary Bishop: José María García Lahiguera (17 May 1950 – 7 Jul 1964), Titular Bishop of Zela (17 May 1950 – 7 Jul 1964); later Bishop of Huelva (Spain) (7 Jul 1964 – 1 Jul 1969), Metropolitan Archbishop of Valencia (Spain) (1 Jul 1969 – retired 25 May 1978), died 1989
  - Auxiliary Bishop: Juan Ricote Alonso (19 Feb 1951 – 23 Jan 1965), Titular Bishop of Miletopolis (19 Feb 1951 – 8 Dec 1968), also as Coadjutor Bishop of Teruel (Spain) (23 Jan 1965 – 8 Dec 1968), later succeeding as Bishop of Teruel (8 Dec 1968 – death 8 Oct 1972) and Apostolic Administrator of Albarracin (Spain) (8 Dec 1968 – 8 Oct 1972)

Archbishops of Madrid

- Casimiro Morcillo González (27 Mar 1964 – death 30 May 1971), Vice-President of Episcopal Conference of Spain (1966 – 1969), President of Episcopal Conference of Spain (1969 – 30 May 1971); previously Titular Bishop of Agathopolis (25 Jan 1943 – 13 May 1950) as Auxiliary Bishop of Madrid y Alcalá de Henares (25 Jan 1943 – 13 May 1950), Bishop of Bilbao (Spain) (13 May 1950 – 21 Sep 1955), Metropolitan Archbishop of Zaragoza (Spain) (21 Sep 1955 – 27 Mar 1964), Undersecretary of Central Commission for the Coordination of the Postconciliar Work and the Interpretation of Conciliar Resolutions (1962 – 1967)
  - Auxiliary Bishop: Maximino Romero de Lema (15 Jun 1964 – 19 Oct 1968), Titular Bishop of Horta, Africa (15 Jun 1964 – 19 Oct 1968); later Bishop of Ávila (Spain) (19 Oct 1968 – 21 Mar 1973), Secretary of Commission of Cardinals for the Pontifical Shrines of Pompeii, Loreto and Bari (1973 – 1986), Secretary of Congregation for Clergy (21 Mar 1973 – 1986), emeritate as Titular Archbishop of Novigrad (Cittanova) (21 Mar 1973 – death 29 Oct 1996)
  - Auxiliary Bishop: José Guerra Campos (15 Jun 1964 – 13 Apr 1973), Titular Bishop of Mutia (15 Jun 1964 – 13 Apr 1973); later Secretary General of Episcopal Conference of Spain (1966 – 1972), Bishop of Cuenca (Spain) (13 Apr 1973 – retired 26 Jun 1996); died 1997
  - Auxiliary Bishop: Angel Morta Figuls (19 Jan 1965 – death 21 Jun 1972), Titular Bishop of Gubaliana (19 Jan 1965 – 21 Jun 1972)
  - Auxiliary Bishop: Ramón Echarren Istúriz (17 Nov 1969 – 27 Nov 1978), Titular Bishop of Denia (17 Nov 1969 – 27 Nov 1978); later Bishop of Islas Canarias (Canary Islands, Spain) (27 Nov 1978 – retired 26 Nov 2005), died 2014
  - Auxiliary Bishop: Ricardo Blanco Granda (17 Nov 1969 – death 2 Aug 1986), Titular Bishop of Cincari (17 Nov 1969 – 2 Aug 1986)
  - Apostolic Administrator Vicente Enrique y Tarancón (30 May 1971 – 3 Dec 1971 see below) while Metropolitan Archbishop of Toledo (Spain) (30 Jan 1969 – 3 Dec 1971), created Cardinal-Priest of S. Giovanni Crisostomo a Monte Sacro Alto (30 Apr 1969 – 28 Nov 1994), President of Episcopal Conference of Spain (1971 – 1981); previously Bishop of Solsona (Spain) (25 Nov 1945 – 12 Apr 1964), Metropolitan Archbishop of Oviedo (Spain) (12 Apr 1964 – 30 Jan 1969), Vice-President of Episcopal Conference of Spain (1969 – 1971)
- Vicente Enrique y Tarancón (see above 3 Dec 1971 – retired 12 Apr 1983), died 1994
  - Auxiliary Bishop: Victorio Oliver Domingo (5 Sep 1972 – 20 Dec 1976), Titular Bishop of Limisa (5 Sep 1972 – 20 Dec 1976); later Bishop of Tarazona (Spain) (20 Dec 1976 – 27 May 1981), Bishop of Albacete (Spain) (27 May 1981 – 22 Feb 1996), Bishop of Orihuela–Alicante (Spain) (22 Feb 1996 – retired 26 Nov 2005)
  - Auxiliary Bishop: José Manuel Estepa Llaurens (5 Sep 1972 – 30 Jul 1983), Titular Bishop of Tisili (5 Sep 1972 – 30 Jul 1983); later last Archbishop Military Vicar of Spain (Spain) (30 Jul 1983 – 21 Jul 1986), Titular Archbishop of Velebusdus (30 Jul 1983 – 18 Nov 1989), restyled first Archbishop Military Ordinary of Spain (Spain) (21 Jul 1986 – 30 Oct 2003), Titular Archbishop of Italica (18 Nov 1989 – 7 Mar 1998), created Cardinal-Priest of S. Gabriele Arcangelo all’Acqua Traversa (20 Nov 2010 [29 Apr 2011] – ...)
  - Auxiliary Bishop: Alberto Iniesta Jiménez (5 Sep 1972 – retired 5 Apr 1998), Titular Bishop of Tubernuca (5 Sep 1972 – death 3 Jan 2016)
- Angel Suquía Goicoechea (12 Apr 1983 – 23 Jul 1991), previously Bishop of Almería (Spain) (17 May 1966 – 28 Nov 1969), Bishop of Málaga (Spain) (28 Nov 1969 – 13 Apr 1973), Metropolitan Archbishop of Santiago de Compostela (Spain) (13 Apr 1973 – 12 Apr 1983)
  - Auxiliary Bishop: Francisco José Pérez y Fernández-Golfin (20 Mar 1985 – 23 Jul 1991), Titular Bishop of Tigillava (20 Mar 1985 – 23 Jul 1991); next Bishop of Getafe (Spain) (23 Jul 1991 – death 24 Feb 2004)
  - Auxiliary Bishop: Agustín García-Gasco y Vicente (20 Mar 1985 – 24 Jul 1992), Titular Bishop of Nin (20 Mar 1985 – 24 Jul 1992), Secretary General of Episcopal Conference of Spain (1988 – 1993); later Metropolitan Archbishop of Valencia (Spain) (24 Jul 1992 – 8 Jan 2009), created Cardinal-Priest of S. Marcello (24 Nov 2007 [5 Apr 2008] – death 1 May 2011)
  - Auxiliary Bishop: Francisco Javier Martínez Fernández (20 Mar 1985 – 15 Mar 1996), Titular Bishop of Voli (20 Mar 1985 – 15 Mar 1996); later Bishop of Córdoba (Spain) (15 Mar 1996 – 15 Mar 2003), Metropolitan Archbishop of Granada (Spain) (15 Mar 2003 – ...)
  - Auxiliary Bishop: Luis Gutiérrez Martín, Claretians (C.M.F.) (15 Sep 1988 – 12 May 1995), Titular Bishop of Tisedi (15 Sep 1988 – 12 May 1995); next Bishop of Segovia (Spain) (12 May 1995 – retired 3 Nov 2007), died 2016

Metropolitan Archbishops of Madrid

- Angel Suquía Goicoechea (23 Jul 1991 – retired 28 Jul 1994), created Cardinal-Priest of Gran Madre di Dio (25 May 1985 – death 13 Jul 2006), President of Episcopal Conference of Spain (1987 – 1993)
- Antonio Rouco Varela (28 Jul 1994 – 28 Aug 2014), created Cardinal-Priest of S. Lorenzo in Damaso (21 Feb 1998 [11 Oct 1998] – ...), President of Episcopal Conference of Spain (2 Mar 1999 – 8 Mar 2005 & 4 Mar 2008 – 12 Mar 2014)), Member of Council of Cardinals for the Study of Organisational and Economic Problems of the Apostolic See (16 Dec 2004 – 24 Feb 2014); previously Titular Bishop of Gergis (17 Sep 1976 – 9 May 1984) as Auxiliary Bishop of Archdiocese of Santiago de Compostela (Spain) (17 Sep 1976 – 11 Jun 1983?9 May 1984), Apostolic Administrator of Santiago de Compostela (11 Jun 1983 – 9 May 1984), Metropolitan Archbishop of Santiago de Compostela (9 May 1984 – 28 Jul 1994)
  - Auxiliary Bishop: César Augusto Franco Martínez (14 May 1996 – 12 Nov 2014), Titular Bishop of Ursona (14 May 1996 – 12 Nov 2014); later Bishop of Segovia (Spain) (12 Nov 2014 – ...)
  - Auxiliary Bishop: Fidel Herráez Vegas (14 May 1996 – 30 Oct 2015), Titular Bishop of Cediæ (14 May 1996 – 30 Oct 2015); later Metropolitan Archbishop of Burgos (Spain) (30 Oct 2015 – ...)
  - Auxiliary Bishop: Eugenio Romero Pose (7 Mar 1997 – death 25 Mar 2007), Titular Bishop of Turuda (7 Mar 1997 – 25 Mar 2007)
- Carlos Osoro Sierra (28 Aug 2014 - 12 June 2023), also Vice-President of Episcopal Conference of Spain (12 Mar 2014 – 14 Mar 2017), Ordinary of Spain of the Eastern Rite (Spain) (9 Jun 2016 – ...), created Cardinal Priest of S. Maria in Trastevere (19 Nov 2016 [25 Feb 2017] – ...); previously Bishop of Orense (Spain) (27 Dec 1996 – 7 Jan 2002), Metropolitan Archbishop of Oviedo (Spain) (7 Jan 2002 – 8 Jan 2009) and Apostolic Administrator of Diocese of Santander (Spain) (23 Sep 2006 – 27 Jul 2007), remaining Apostolic Administrator of Oviedo (8 Jan 2009 – 21 Nov 2009), Metropolitan Archbishop of Valencia (Spain) (8 Jan 2009 – 28 Aug 2014)
  - Auxiliary Bishop (17 Nov 2007 – ...): Juan Antonio Martínez Camino, S.J., Titular Bishop of Bigastro (17 Nov 2007 – ...), former Secretary General of Episcopal Conference of Spain (18 Jun 2003 – 20 Nov 2013).
- José Cobo Cano (12 June 2023 – present)

== See also ==
- List of Catholic dioceses in Spain, Andorra, Ceuta and Gibraltar

== Sources and external links ==
- GCatholic, with Google map & satellite photo - data for all sections
