= List of Catholic dioceses in Spain =

Map of current Catholic (arch-)dioceses in Spain

The diocesan system of the Catholic church government in Spain consists mainly of a nearly entirely Latin hierarchy of 69 territorial (arch-)dioceses:

- fourteen ecclesiastical provinces, each headed by a metropolitan archbishop (one of which, Toledo, uses the Mozarabic rite), have a total of 55 suffragan dioceses.

Exempt, i.e., directly subject to the Holy See, are:

- the (vacant) Latin Titular Patriarchate of the West Indies
- the Spanish military ordinariate, which is a Latin army bishopric (personal diocese for the military) headed by an archbishop
- the joint Ordinariate for the Faithful of Eastern Rite for all Eastern Catholics in Spain.

All are members of the national episcopal conference of Spain.

There is also an Apostolic Nunciature to Spain (in the national capital Madrid), into which is also vested the nunciature to Andorra.

== Exempt current jurisdictions ==
=== Latin ===
- Military Archbishopric of Spain, personal archbishopric for the Spanish armed forces

=== Eastern Rite ordinariate ===
- Ordinariate for the Faithful of Eastern Rite in Spain

== Current Latin provinces ==
=== Ecclesiastical province of Barcelona ===
- Metropolitan Archdiocese of Barcelona
  - Diocese of Sant Feliu de Llobregat
  - Diocese of Terrassa

=== Ecclesiastical province of Burgos ===
- Metropolitan Archdiocese of Burgos
  - Diocese of Bilbao
  - Diocese of Osma-Soria
  - Diocese of Palencia
  - Diocese of Vitoria

=== Ecclesiastical province of Granada ===
- Metropolitan Archdiocese of Granada
  - Diocese of Almería
  - Diocese of Cartagena
  - Diocese of Guadix
  - Diocese of Jaén
  - Diocese of Málaga

=== Ecclesiastical province of Madrid ===
- Metropolitan Archdiocese of Madrid
  - Diocese of Alcalá de Henares
  - Diocese of Getafe

=== Ecclesiastical province of Mérida-Badajoz ===
- Metropolitan Archdiocese of Mérida-Badajoz
  - Diocese of Coria-Cáceres
  - Diocese of Plasencia

=== Ecclesiastical province of Oviedo ===
- Metropolitan Archdiocese of Oviedo
  - Diocese of Astorga
  - Diocese of León
  - Diocese of Santander

=== Ecclesiastical province of Pamplona ===
- Metropolitan Archdiocese of Pamplona y Tudela
  - Diocese of Calahorra and La Calzada-Logroño
  - Diocese of Jaca
  - Diocese of San Sebastián

=== Ecclesiastical province of Santiago de Compostela ===
- Metropolitan Archdiocese of Santiago de Compostela
  - Diocese of Lugo
  - Diocese of Mondoñedo-Ferrol
  - Diocese of Ourense
  - Diocese of Tui-Vigo

=== Ecclesiastical province of Seville ===
- Metropolitan Archdiocese of Seville
  - Diocese of Cádiz and Ceuta, which includes the Spanish exclaves in Morocco
  - Diocese of Córdoba
  - Diocese of Huelva
  - Diocese of Canarias
  - Diocese of Jerez de la Frontera
  - Diocese of San Cristóbal de La Laguna

=== Ecclesiastical province of Tarragona ===
- Metropolitan Archdiocese of Tarragona
  - Diocese of Girona
  - Diocese of Lleida
  - Diocese of Solsona
  - Diocese of Tortosa
  - Diocese of Urgell, which includes Andorra, where he is prince-bishop as joint head of state (with the French president)
  - Diocese of Vic

=== Ecclesiastical province of Toledo ===
- Metropolitan Archdiocese of Toledo, which uses the Mozarabic Rite
  - Diocese of Albacete
  - Diocese of Ciudad Real
  - Diocese of Cuenca
  - Diocese of Sigüenza-Guadalajara

=== Ecclesiastical province of Valencia ===
- Metropolitan Archdiocese of Valencia
  - Diocese of Ibiza
  - Diocese of Majorca
  - Diocese of Menorca
  - Diocese of Orihuela-Alicante
  - Diocese of Segorbe-Castellón

=== Ecclesiastical province of Valladolid ===
- Metropolitan Archdiocese of Valladolid
  - Diocese of Ávila
  - Diocese of Ciudad Rodrigo
  - Diocese of Salamanca
  - Diocese of Segovia
  - Diocese of Zamora

=== Ecclesiastical province of Zaragoza ===
- Metropolitan Archdiocese of Zaragoza
  - Diocese of Barbastro-Monzón
  - Diocese of Huesca
  - Diocese of Tarazona
  - Diocese of Teruel and Albarracín

== Titular sees ==
(Excluding the current but vacant Latin titular patriarchate, above)

- Forty-eight Titular bishoprics (all Episcopal): Diocese of Abula, Diocese of Acci, Diocese of Álava, Diocese of Algeciras, Diocese of Amaia, Diocese of Arcavica, Diocese of Assidona ? Asidonia, Diocese of Auca, Diocese of Baeza, Diocese of Basti (Baza), Diocese of Besalú, Diocese of Bigastro, Diocese of Britonia, Diocese of Castulo, Diocese of Celene, Diocese of Denia, Diocese of Écija, Diocese of Egabro, Diocese of Egara, Diocese of Elepla, Diocese of Elicroca, Diocese of Elo, Diocese of Emerita Augusta (now Mérida(-Badajoz), again suppressed as titular see), Diocese of Fuerteventura, Diocese of Iliturgi, Illiberi (Elvira / Eliberi / Granada / Ilurir), Diocese of Illici, Diocese of Ipagro, Diocese of Iria Flavia, Diocese of Italica, Diocese of Mentesa, Diocese of Naiera (Najéra), Diocese of Oreto, Diocese of Rota, Diocese of Rotdon, Diocese of Rubicon, Diocese of Saetabis, Diocese of Sasabe, Diocese of Segia, Diocese of Segisama, Diocese of Telde, Diocese of Tucci, Diocese of Urci, Diocese of Ursona, Diocese of Valabria, Diocese of Valeria, Diocese of Valliposita, Diocese of Vergi

== Other ==
(Excluding mere predecessors of current sees)

- Roman Catholic Diocese of Albarracin
- Roman Catholic Diocese of Ceuta
- Roman Catholic Diocese of Tudela

== Gallery of Archdioceses ==
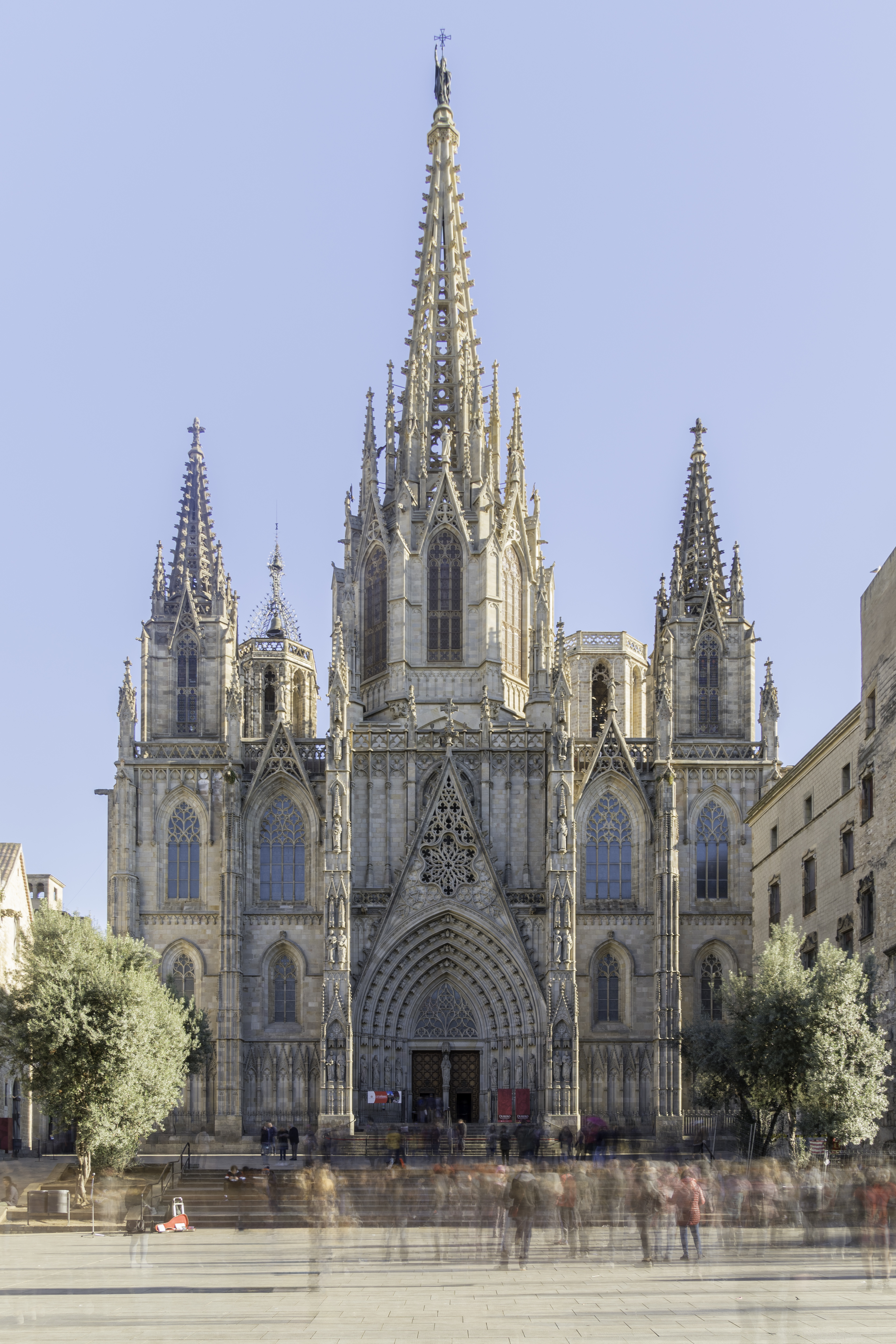
The seat of the Archdiocese of Barcelona is Catedral de la Santa Cruz y Santa Eulalia.

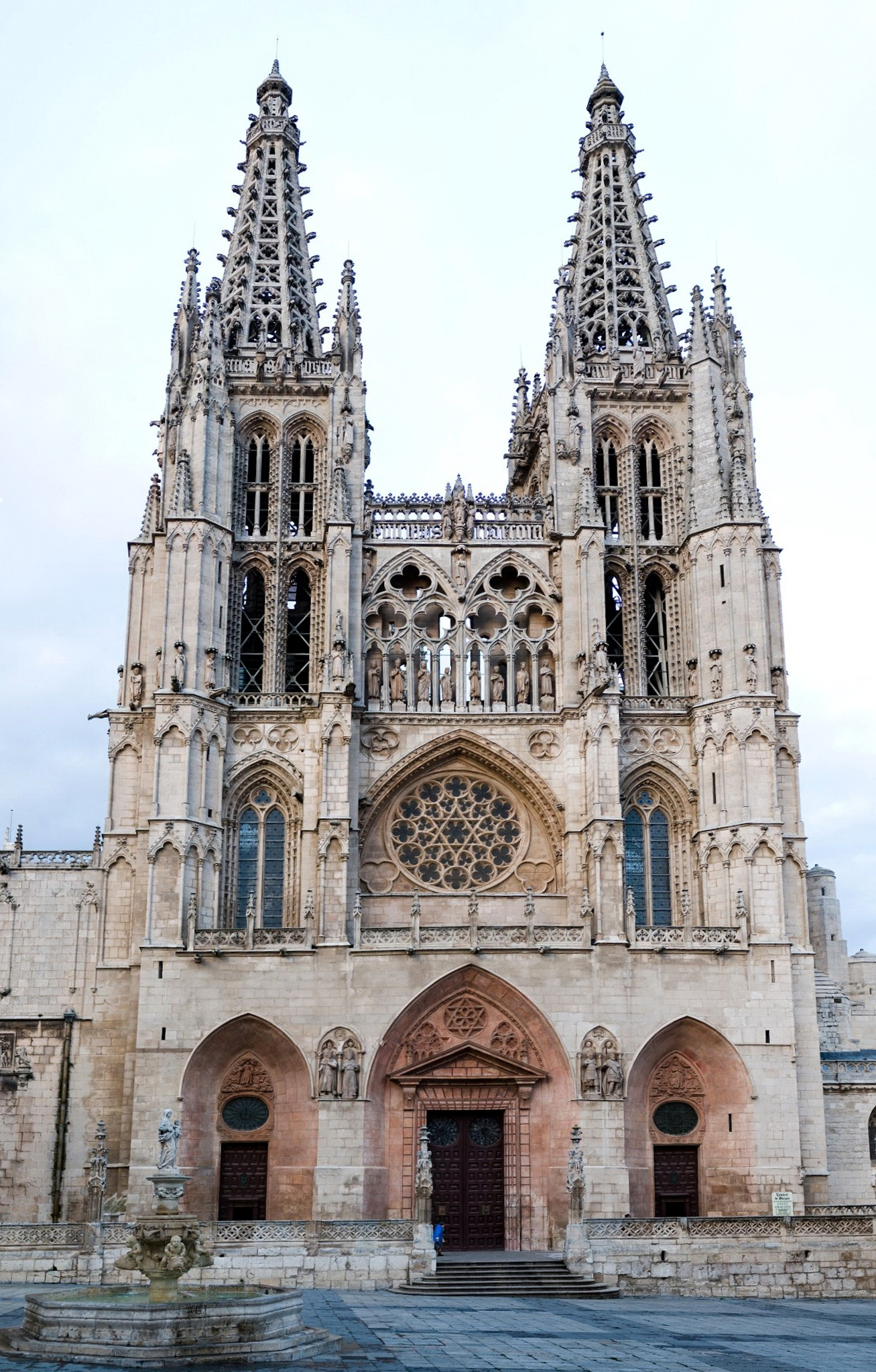
The seat of the Archdiocese of Burgos is Catedral Metropolitana de Santa María.

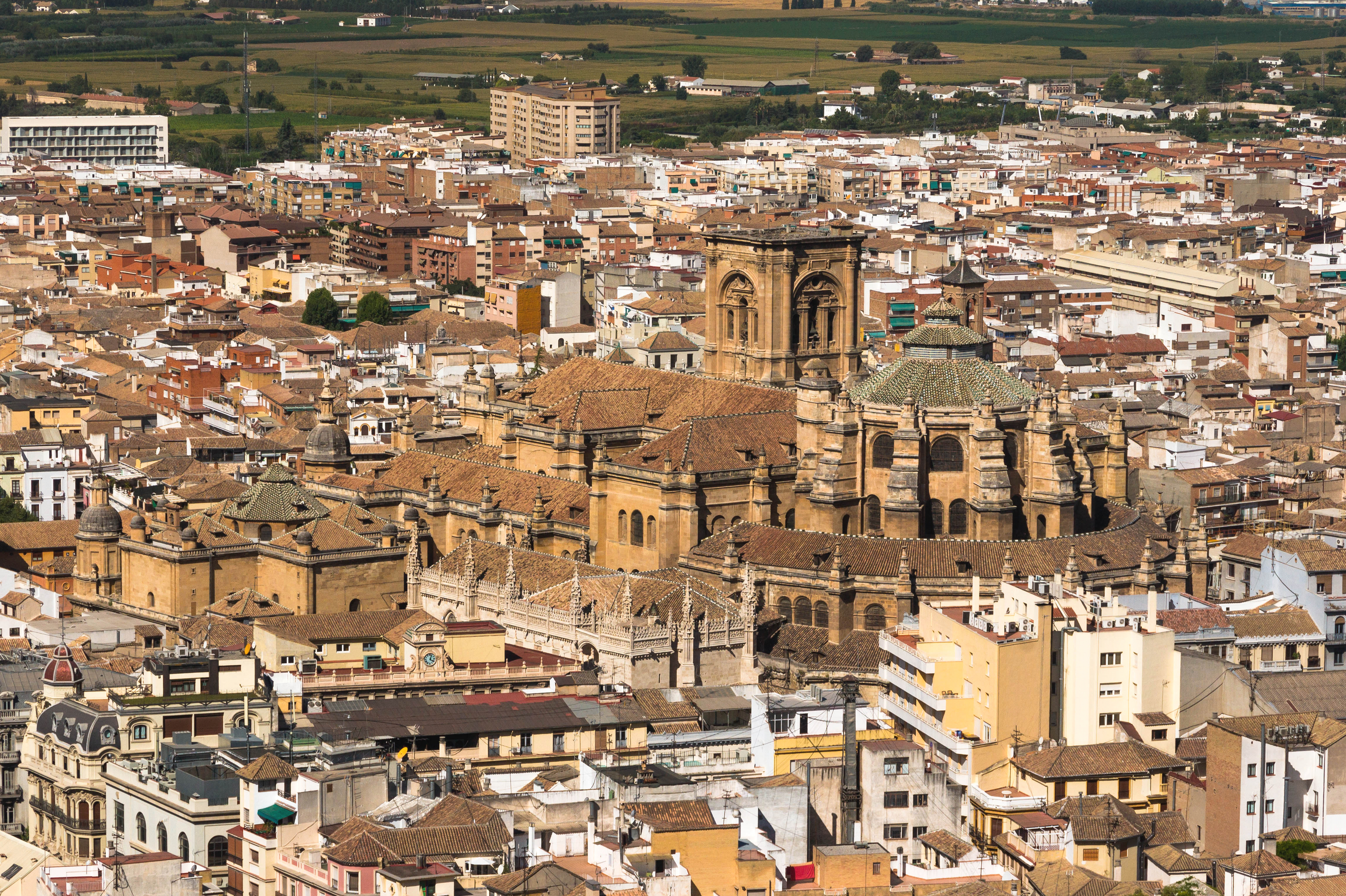
The seat of the Archdiocese of Granada is Catedral de la Anunciación.

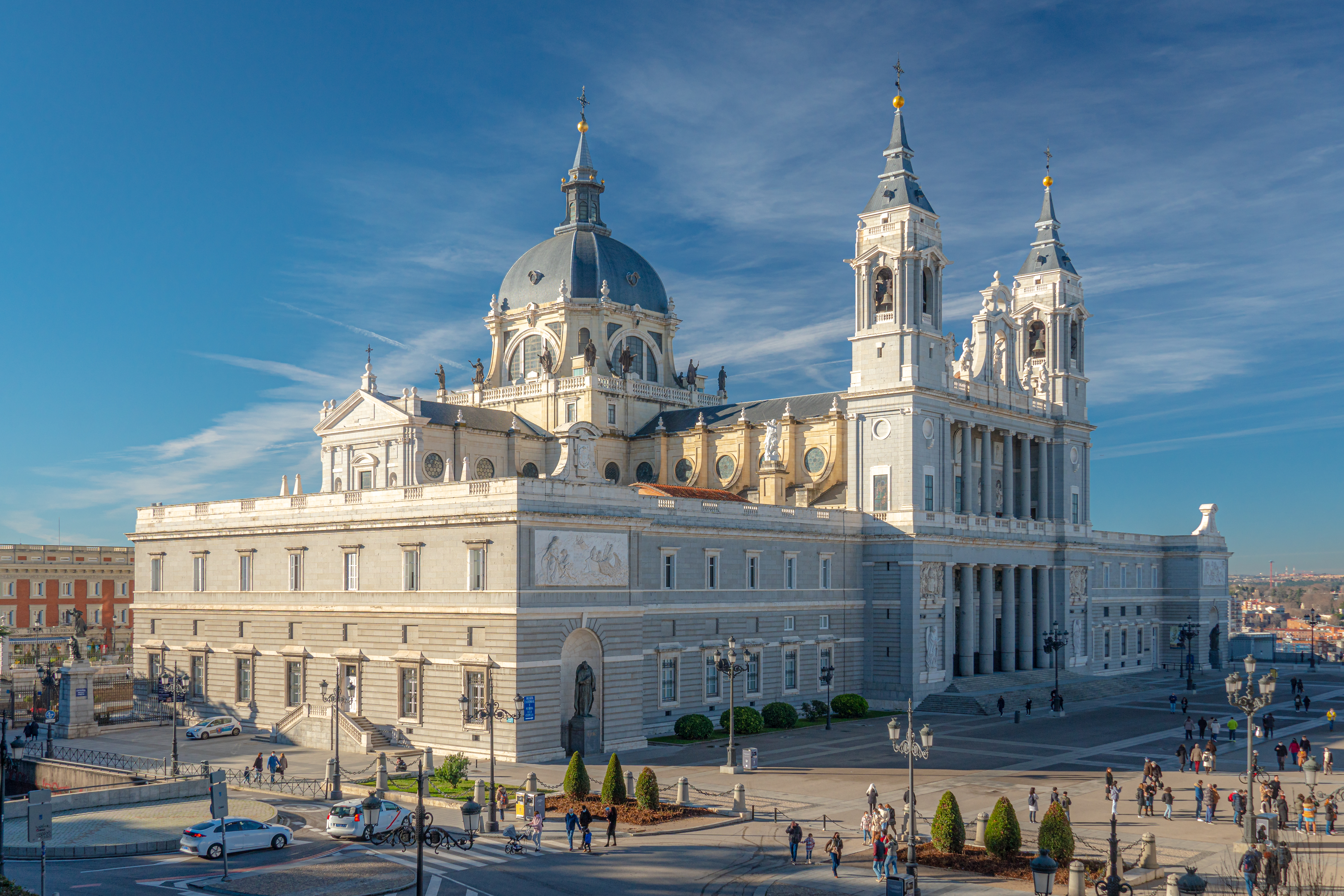
The seat of the Archdiocese of Madrid is Catedral de Santa María la Real de la Almudena.

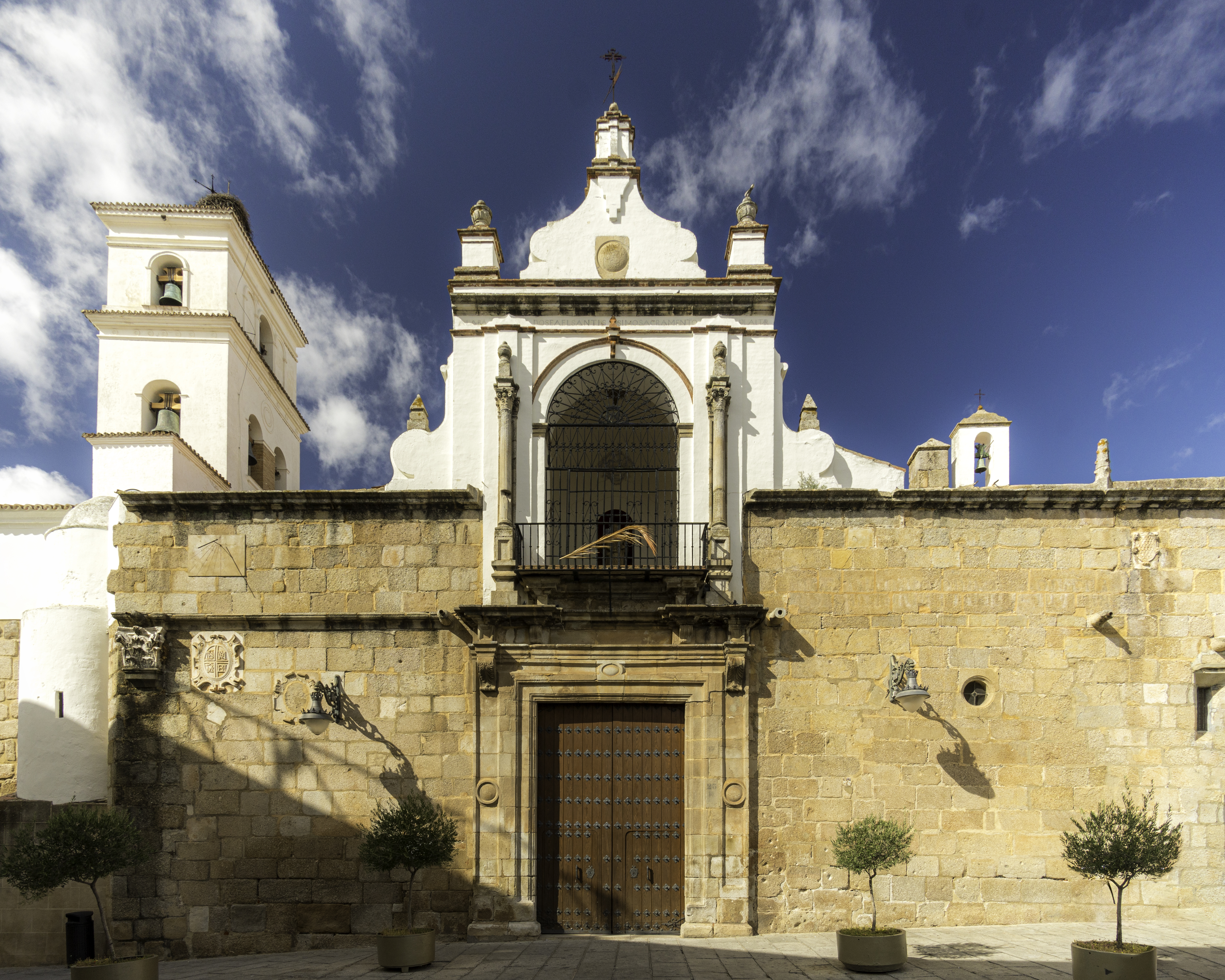
The seat of the Archdiocese of Mérida-Badajoz is Concatedral Metropolitana de San Maria la Mayor.

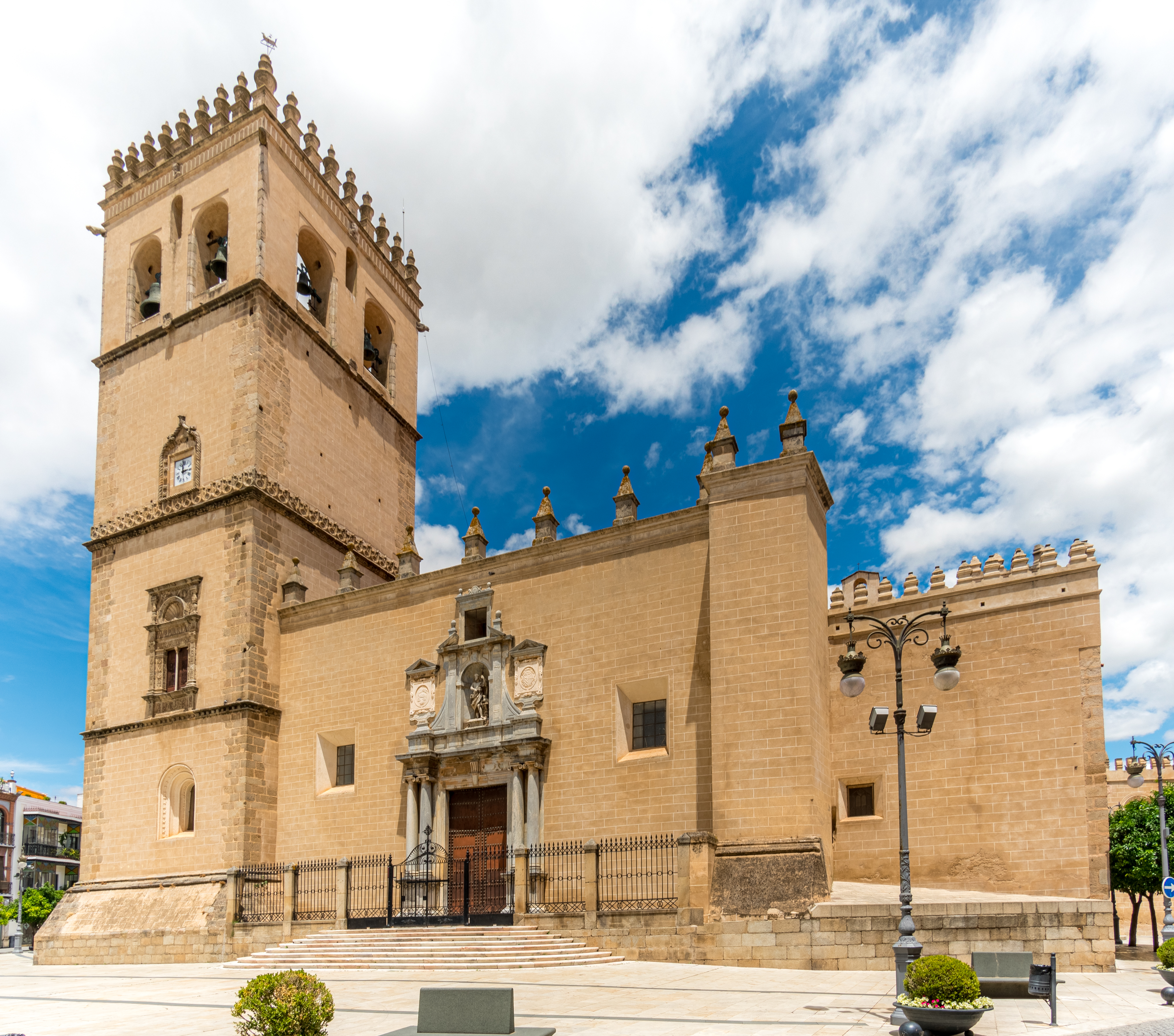
The co-seat of the Archdiocese of Mérida-Badajoz is Catedral Metropolitana de San Juan Bautista (Badajoz).

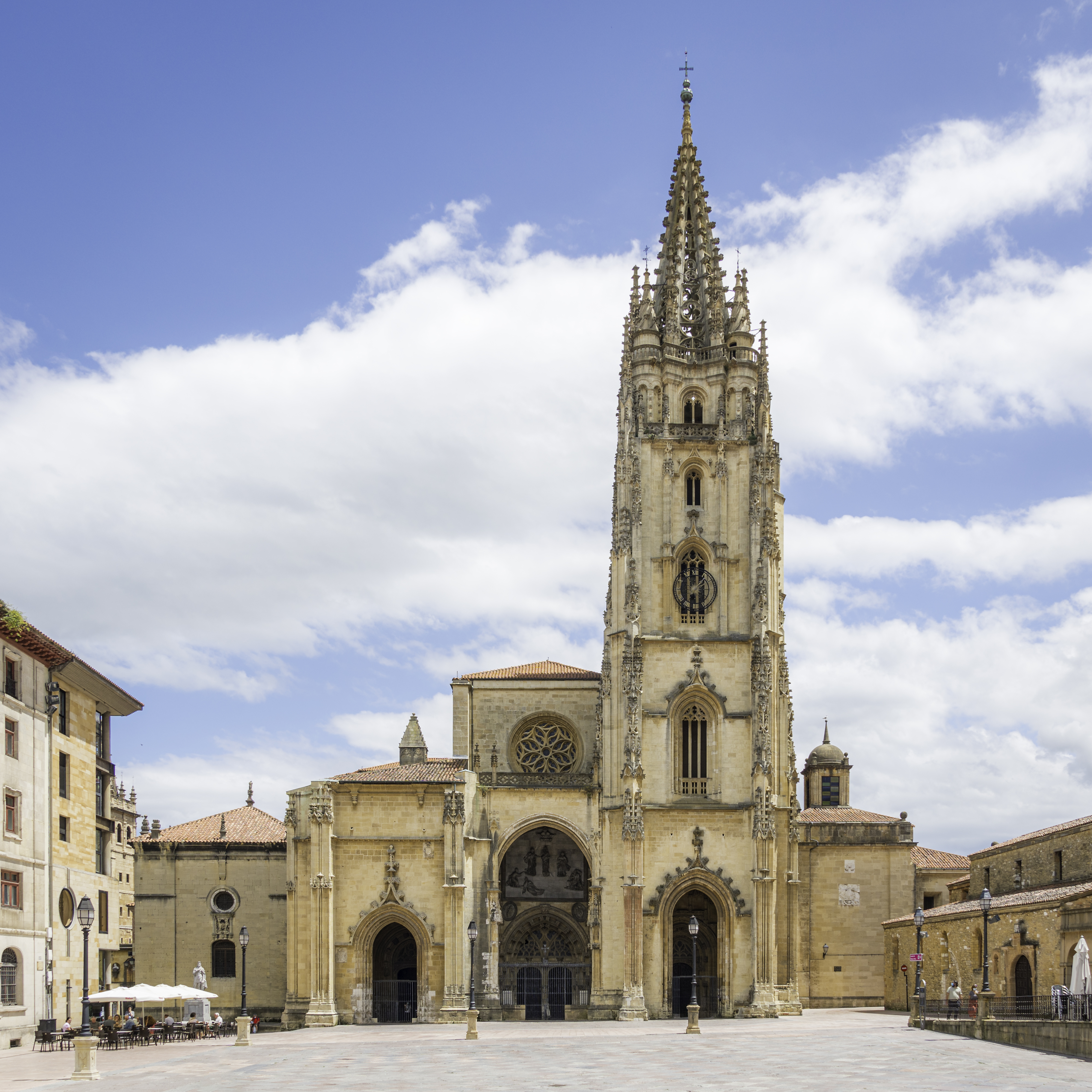
The seat of the Archdiocese of Oviedo is Catedral Metropolitana Basílica de San Salvador.

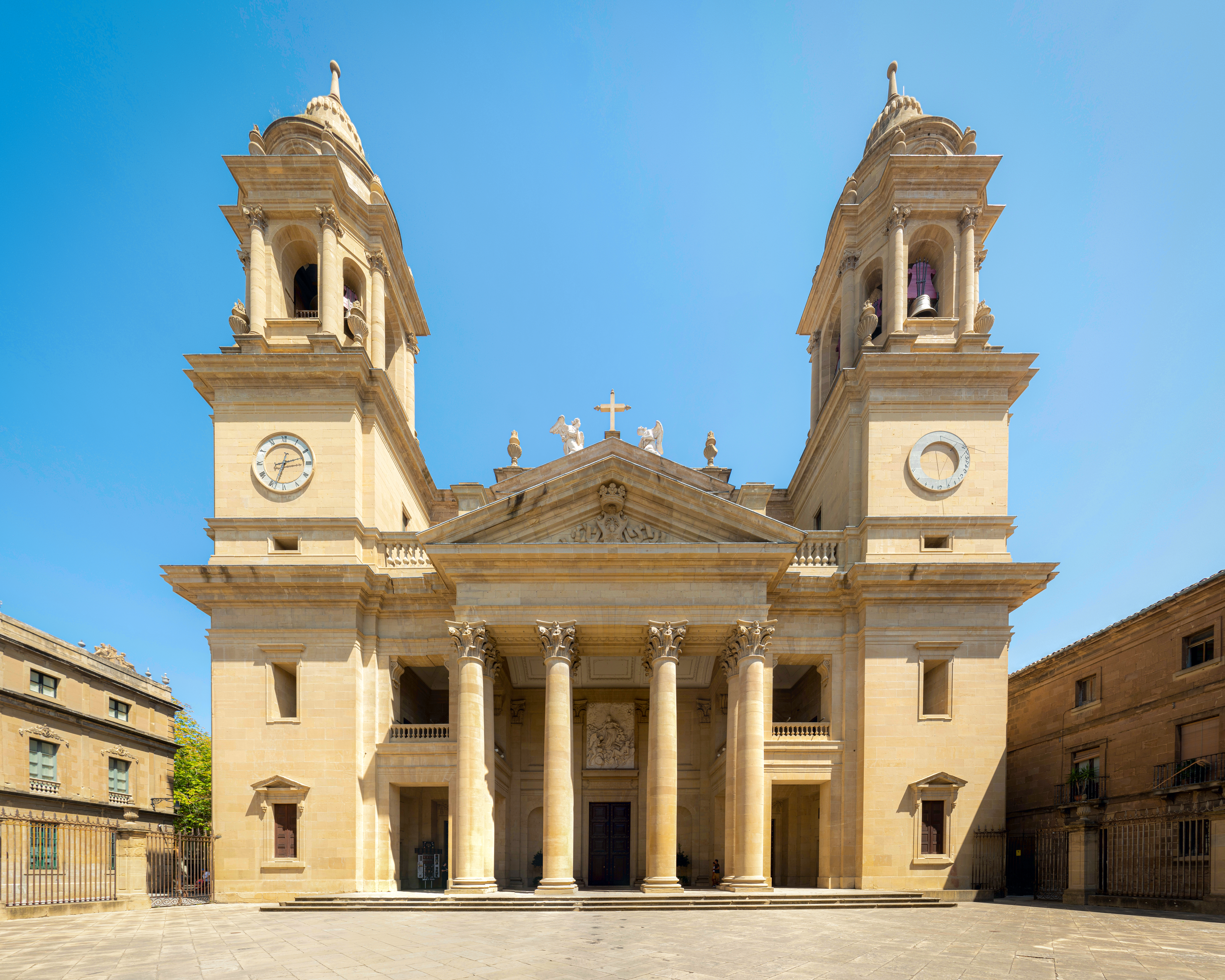
The seat of the Archdiocese of Pamplona y Tudela is Santa María la Real.

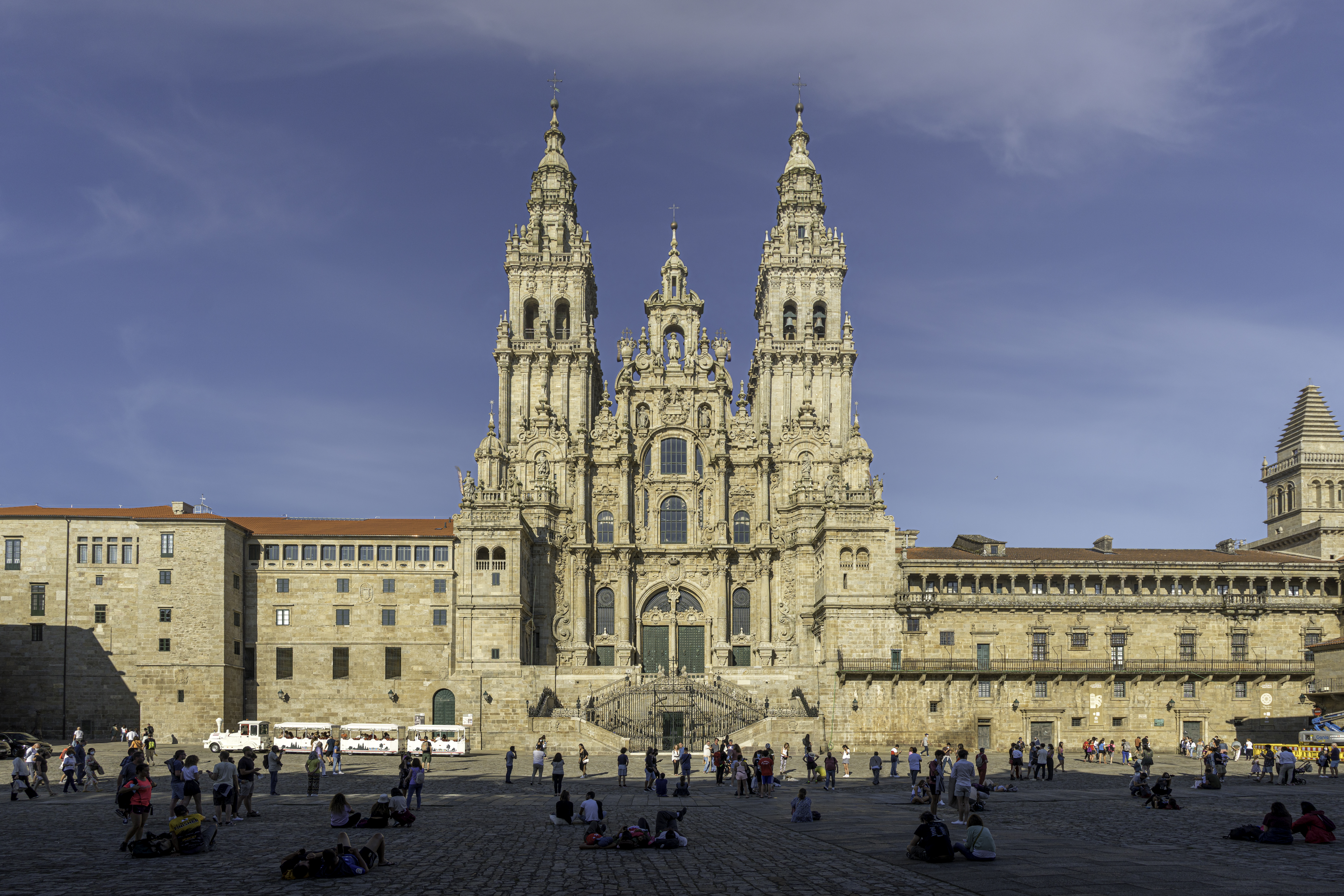
The seat of the Archdiocese of Santiago de Compostela is Catedral de Santiago de Compostela.

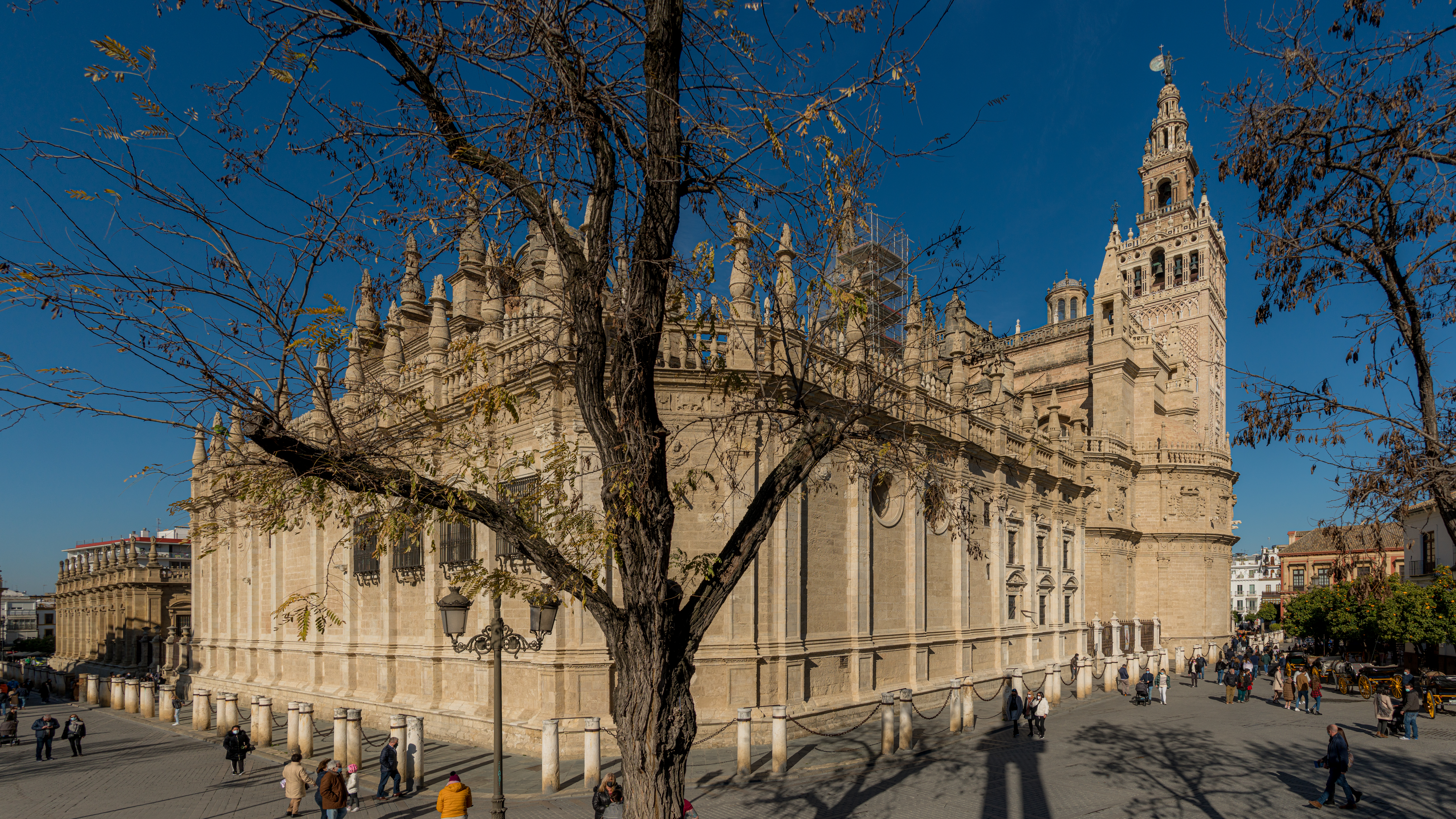
The seat of the Archdiocese of Seville is Catedral de Santa María de la Sede.

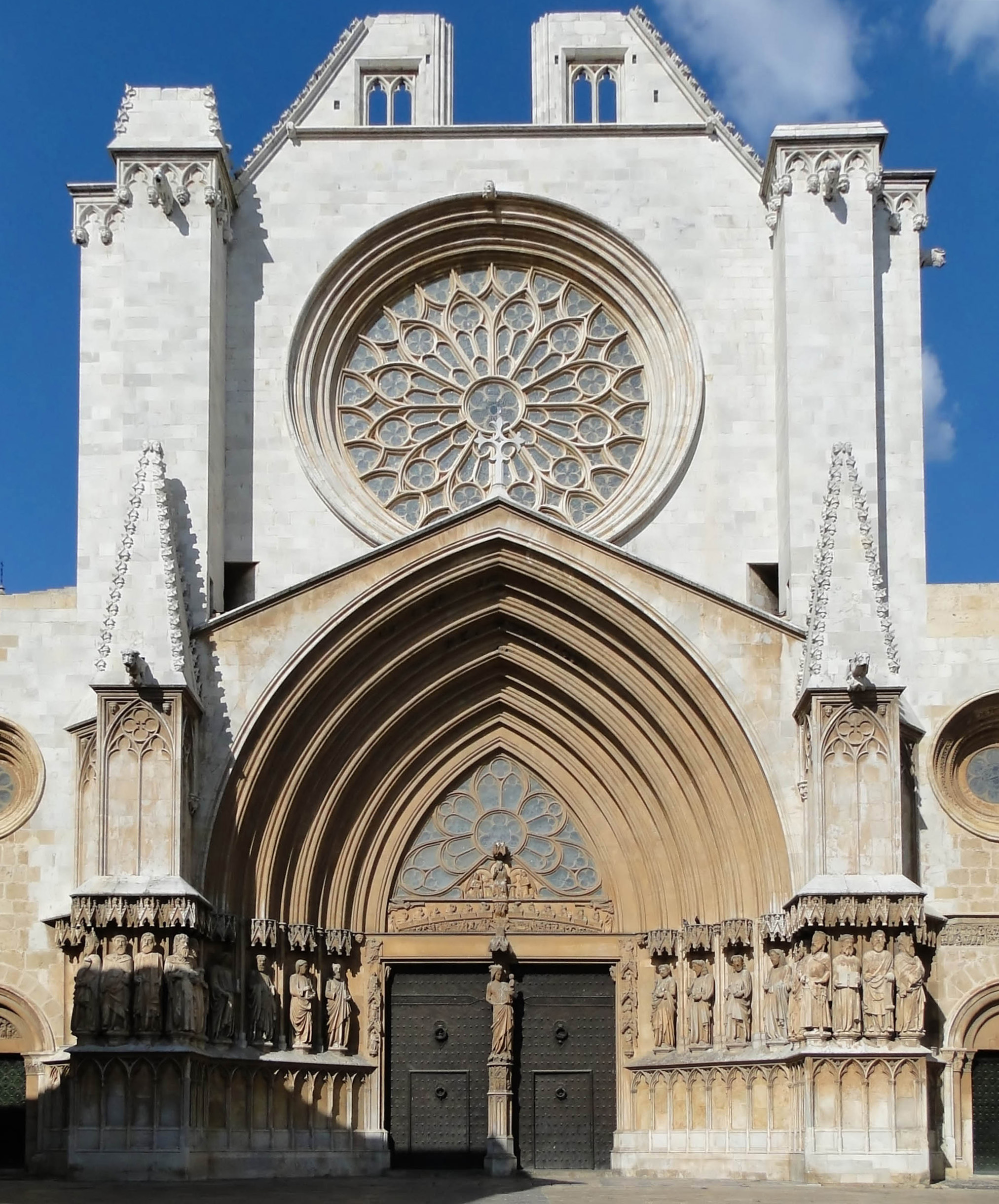
The seat of the Archdiocese of Tarragona is Basílica Catedral Metropolitana y Primada de Santa María.

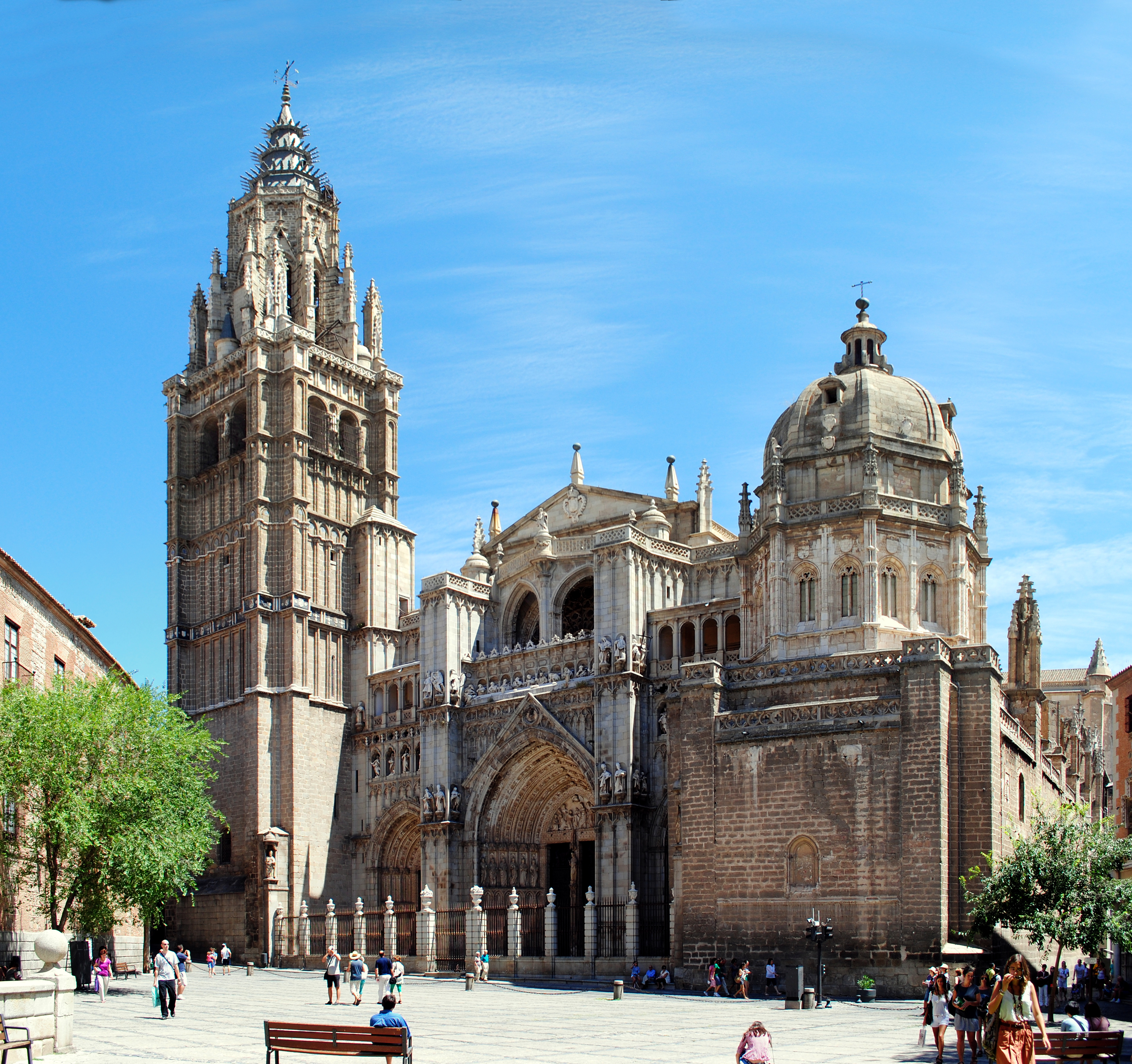
The seat of the Archdiocese of Toledo is Catedral Primada de Santa María de la Asunción.

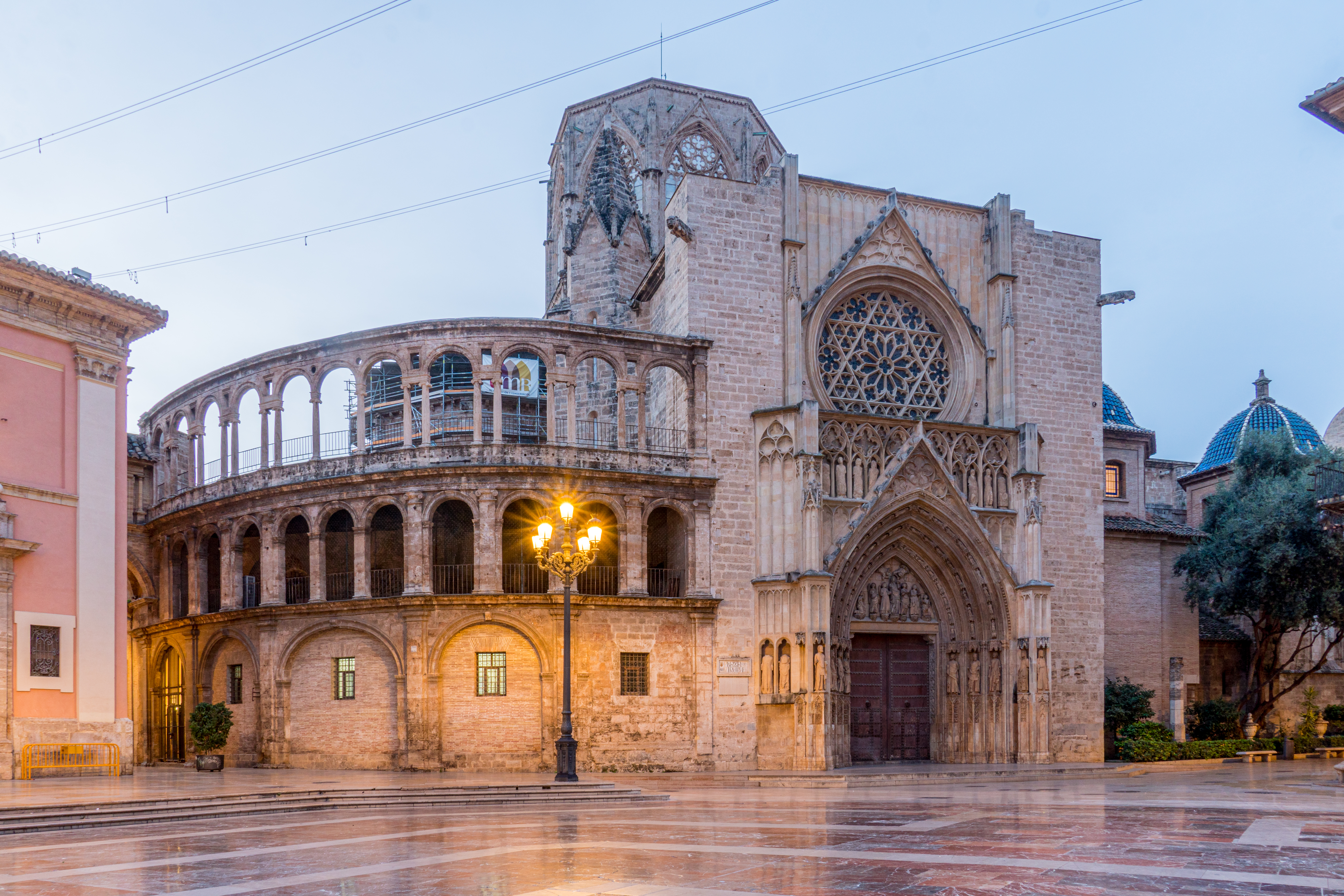
The seat of the Archdiocese of Valencia is Catedral Basílica Metropolitana de Santa Maria.

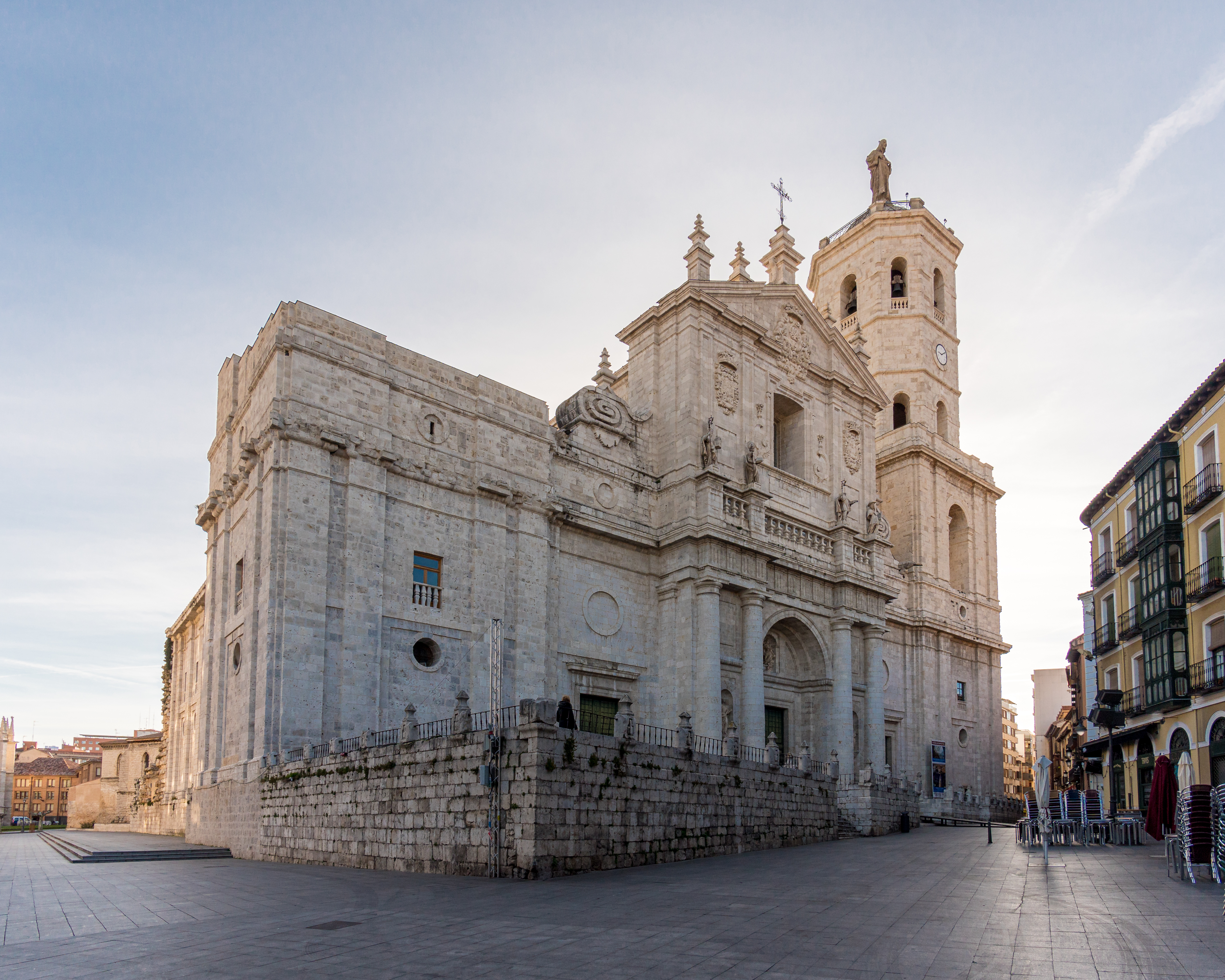
The seat of the Archdiocese of Valladolid is Catedral de Nuestra Señora de la Asunción.

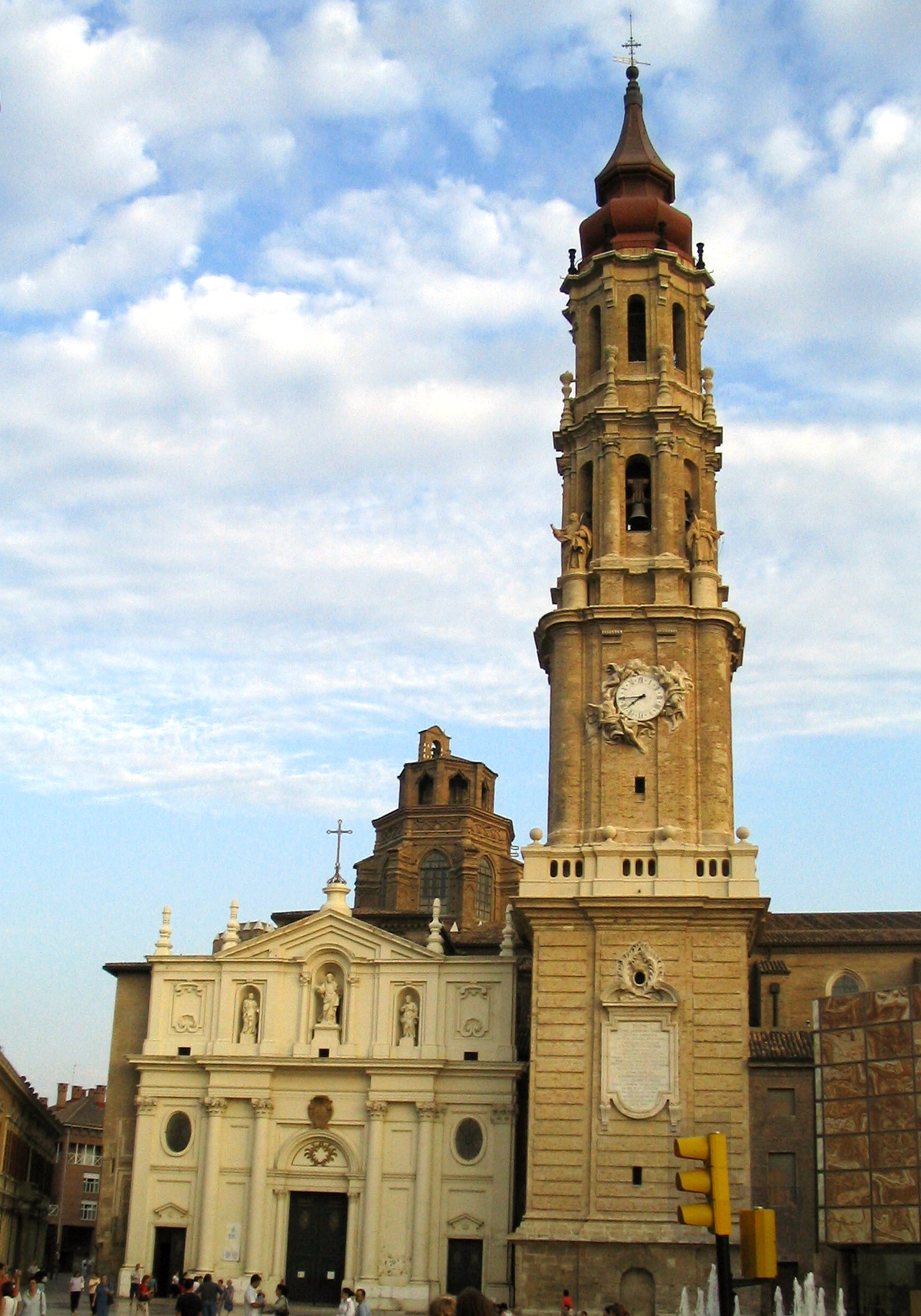
The seat of the Archdiocese of Zaragoza is Catedral de El Salvador de la Seo.

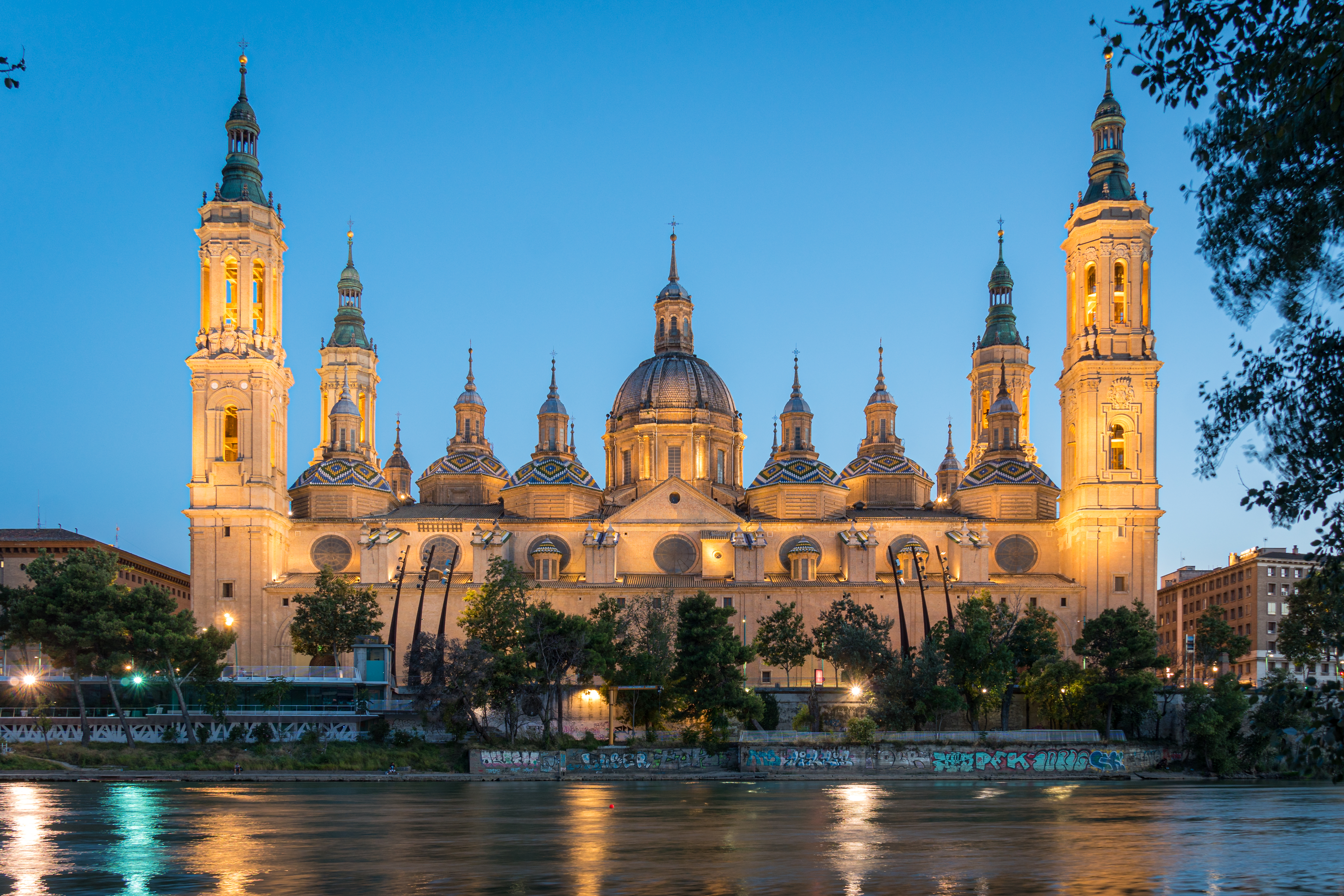
The co-seat of the Archdiocese of Zaragoza is Catedral-Basílica de Nuestra Señora del Pilar.

== Sources and external links ==
- GCatholic.org - Spain.
- GCatholic.org - Andorra.
- Catholic-Hierarchy entry.
