= Spanish Episcopal Conference =

Assembly of Catholic bishops in Spain and Andorra

The Logo of the Spanish Episcopal Conference

The Spanish Episcopal Conference (Spanish: Conferencia Episcopal Española, Catalan: Conferència Episcopal Espanyola) is an administrative institution composed of all the bishops of the dioceses of Spain and Andorra, in communion with the Roman Pontiff and under his authority. Its purpose is the joint exercise certain pastoral functions of the episcopate on the faithful of their territory, under common law and statutes, in order to promote the life of the Church, to strengthen its mission of evangelization and respond more effectively to the greater good that the Church should seek to men.

== Magisterial foundation ==
The documents that outline the life and work of the 113 Episcopal Conferences currently in the world, are: Lumen gentium (23), Christus Dominus (37-38), Ecclesiae Imago (211), Sanctae Ecclesiae (41), Apostolos Suos and the 1983 Code of Canon Law (cn. 447-459).

The Spanish Episcopal Conference was constituted by rescript of the Sacred Consistorial Congregation, protocol No. 1.047/64, of 03.10.1966. Public legal personality ecclesiastical and civil 2 under the Agreement on Legal Affairs of 03.01.1979 between the Holy See and the Spanish State.

His first Statute was adopted by the Constituent Assembly in the year 1966 and ratified the same year by Pope Paul VI "ad quinquenium" (five years). He received the ultimate recognition, on February 5, 1977, by decree of the Congregation for Bishops. Subsequently, the LI Plenary Assembly approved in November 1989 amending some articles, confirmed by the Congregation for Bishops, by decree of February 5 of 1991. The last renovation was approved by the Plenary Assembly XCII Spanish Episcopal Conference (24 – November 28, 2008) and confirmed by Decree of the Congregation for Bishops on 19 December of that year. Under Article 2 of the Statutes of the Spanish Episcopal Conference (CEE), are full members of the Archbishops and Bishops diocesan Archbishop military, the Archbishops and Bishops Coadjutor and Auxiliary, the apostolic administrators and diocesan administrator in addition to the Archbishops and Bishops emeriti members and special office at the national level, entrusted by the Holy See or the Episcopal Conference. All the Spanish Bishops pastoral office have voice and vote in the Plenary Assembly, the Bishops Emeritus (retired), without pastoral charge, only a consultative vote. 3 charges are elected for three years (three years) and may not exceed three terms, except the Secretary General is elected for five years (five years).

== Presidents of the Spanish Episcopal Conference ==
The Chair moderates the overall activity of the conference and represents it legally. Take care of the relations of the Episcopal Conference with the Holy See and with other episcopal conferences. Convenes and chairs meetings of the Plenary Assembly and the Permanent Commission and Executive Committee. The Chairman has a duration of three years. Throughout the history of the Episcopal Conference of bishops who have presided have been:

1. Fernando Quiroga Palacios, Cardinal and Archbishop of Santiago de Compostela (1966–1969)
2. Casimiro Morcillo Gonzalez, Archbishop of Madrid-Alcalá (1969–1971)
3. Vicente Enrique y Tarancon, Cardinal and Archbishop of Madrid-Alcalá (1971–1981, completed the 1969–1972 triennium death of Casimiro Morcillo, and three year periods)
4. Gabino Díaz Merchán, Archbishop of Oviedo (1981–1987)
5. Ángel Suquía Goicoechea, Emeritus Cardinal and Archbishop of Madrid (1987–1993)
6. Elías Yanes Álvarez, Archbishop of Zaragoza (1993–1999)
7. Antonio Maria Rouco Varela, Cardinal and Archbishop of Madrid (1999–2005)
8. Ricardo Blázquez Pérez, Bishop of Bilbao (2005–2008)
9. Antonio Maria Rouco Varela, Cardinal and Archbishop of Madrid (2008–2014)
10. Ricardo Blázquez Pérez, Cardinal and Archbishop of Valladolid (2014–2020)
11. Juan José Omella, Cardinal and Archbishop of Barcelona (2020–2024)
12. Luis Javier Argüello García, Archbishop of Valladolid (2024-present)

== Vice Presidents of the Spanish Episcopal Conference ==
1. Casimiro Morcillo Gonzalez (1966–1969)
2. Vicente Enrique y Tarancon, Cardinal (1969–1971)
3. José Bueno y Monreal, Cardinal (1972–1978)
4. José María Cirarda Lachiondo (1978–1981)
5. Jose Delicado Baeza (1981–1987)
6. Elías Yanes Álvarez (1987–1993)
7. Fernando Sebastián Aguilar (1993–1999)
8. Ricardo María Carles Gordó, Cardinal (1999–2002)
9. Fernando Sebastián Aguilar (2002–2005)
10. Antonio Cañizares Llovera, Cardinal (2005–2008)
11. Ricardo Blázquez Pérez (2008–2014)
12. Carlos Osoro Sierra, Cardinal (2014–2017)
13. Antonio Cañizares Llovera, Cardinal (2017–2020)
14. Carlos Osoro Sierra, Cardinal (2014–2024)
15. José Cobo Cano, Cardinal (2024–present)

== General Secretaries of the Spanish Episcopal Conference ==
1. 1966–1972 – José Guerra Campos
2. 1972–1977 – Elías Yanes Álvarez
3. 1977–1982 – Jesús Iribarren Rodríguez
4. 1982–1988 – Fernando Sebastián Aguilar
5. 1988–1993 – Agustín García-Gasco Vicente, Cardinal
6. 1993–1998 – José Sánchez González
7. 1998–2003 – Juan José Asenjo Pelegrina
8. 2003–2013 – Juan Antonio Martínez Camino
9. 2013–2018 – José María Gil Tamayo
10. 2018–2022 – Luis Javier Argüello García
11. 2022–present – Francisco César García Magán

== Executive Committee of the Spanish Episcopal Conference (triennium 2014–2017) ==
The Executive Committee consists of the following members: Three by reason of his position: President, Vice President and Secretary General of the Spanish Episcopal Conference. The Archbishop of Madrid, if it has one of the charges listed. Three more Bishops elected for this purpose from among the full members of the Conference, or four if the Archbishop of Madrid is one of the charges listed. These bishops may not hold office in any Episcopal Commission.

== Statutes of the Spanish Episcopal Conference, Articles 24 § 2. ==
Currently:

- President: Luis Javier Argüello García, Archbishop of Valladolid
- Vice President: José Cobo Cano, Cardinal, Archbishop of Madrid.
- Secretary General: Francisco César García Magán, auxiliar bishop of Toledo.
- Members: Ginés García Beltrán, bishop of Getafe; Jesús Sanz Montes, OFM, archbishop of Oviedo; Mario Iceta Gavicagogeascoa, arzobispo de Burgos; Enrique Benavent Vidal, archbishop of Valencia; José Ángel Saiz Meneses, arzobispo de Sevilla; José María Gil Tamayo, archbishop of Granada.

== Committees of the Spanish Episcopal Conference (triennium 2014–2017) ==
The Episcopal Commissions are bodies established by the Conference, the service of the Plenary Assembly for the study and treatment of some problems in a particular field of common pastoral activity of the Church in Spain, in accordance with the general guidelines adopted by the Assembly Whole.

Each Episcopal Commission consist of a Chairman and a variable number of members as determined by the Plenary Assembly at the proposal of the Standing Committee. Statutes of the Spanish Episcopal Conference, Articles 29 and 31 § 1. Thus, the Plenary Assembly XCVII (March 2011) found the chairs in the following bishops:

- President of the Lay Apostolate EC: Javier Salinas Viñals, Auxiliary Bishop of Valencia.
- President of the EC of the Clergy: Jesus E. Ibanez Catala, Bishop of Malaga.
- President of the EC for the Doctrine of the Faith: Adolfo Gonzalez Montes, Bishop of Almeria.
- EC President Education and Catechesis: Casimiro Lopez Llorente, Bishop of Segovia-Castellón.
- EC President Liturgy: Julián López Martín., Bishop of León.
- President of the European Social Media: Ginés Ramón García Beltrán, Bishop of Guadix.
- President of the European Migration: Ciriaco Benavente Mateos, Bishop of Albacete.
- EC President Mission and Cooperation between the Churches: Braulio Rodríguez Plaza, Archbishop of Toledo and primate of Spain.
- President of the EC's Pastoral: Sebastia Taltavull Anglada, Auxiliary Bishop of Barcelona.
- President of the Social Pastoral EC: Juan José Omella Omella, Archbishop of Barcelona.
- President of the European Cultural Heritage: Jesus Garcia Burillo, Bishop of Avila.
- EC President Interfaith Relations: Francisco Javier Martinez Fernandez, Archbishop of Granada.
- President of the EC for Seminaries and Universities: Joan Enric Vives Sicília, Bishop of Urgell.
- EC President for Religious Life: Vicente Jiménez Zamora, Archbishop of Zaragoza.

== Council of the Presidency ==
The Cardinals are members of the Conference of the Council Presidency of the same. The Papal Representative is honorary member of the Governing Board, when attending meetings of the Conference or by mandate of the Holy See, or by request of the same Conference expressed by its president, and always in the opening session of each Plenary Assembly. Statutes of the Spanish Episcopal Conference, Article 5 and 7.

- Ricardo Blázquez, Cardinal Archbishop of Valladolid and President of the Spanish Episcopal Conference.
- Antonio Cañizares Llovera, Cardinal Archbishop of Valencia and Vice President of the Spanish Episcopal Conference.
- José María Gil Tamayo, Secretary General of the Spanish Episcopal Conference.
- Carlos Osoro Sierra, Emeritus Cardinal Archbishop of Madrid.

== Presidents of Episcopal Subcommittees ==
Family and Defense of Life: Mario Iceta Gavicagogeascoa, Bishop of Bilbao Catechesis: Javier Salinas Viñals, Bishop of Tortosa Universities: Agustin Cortes Soriano, Bishop of Sant Feliu de Llobregat

== Episcopal Board of Legal Affairs ==
Chairman: D. Bishop Carlos Lopez Hernandez, Bishop of Salamanca

== President ==
Ricardo Blázquez Pérez, Cardinal Archbishop of Valladolid and President of the Spanish Episcopal Conference (member equity).

Members

- José María Gil Tamayo, Secretary General of the Spanish Episcopal Conference (member equity).
- Antonio Algora Hernando, Bishop of Ciudad Real.
- Amadeo Rodríguez Magro, Bishop of Jaén.
- Francesc Pardo Artigas, Bishop of Girona.
- Don Fernando Giménez Barriocanal, Deputy Secretary of Economic Affairs (member equity).

== Standing Committee ==
The Standing Committee is the body that looks after the preparation of the Plenary Assemblies and the implementation of decisions taken on them. The Standing Committee shall consist of: President, Vice President and Secretary General of the Conference, which will also Permanent Commission. The Presidents of the Episcopal Commissions of the fixed and those mentioned in Art. 17, 7, or, if this is not a member of the same Bishop. The Metropolitan Church that Province who has not, in any other capacity, any of its members in the Standing Committee. The Presidents of the Regions Ecclesiastical they do not belong in any other capacity to the Standing Committee. The bishops elected to the Executive Committee, pursuant to art. 24 § 2, 3. º. A cardinal, in order of precedence, which is a full member of the Conference and not part of the Permanent Commission for another title. The Archbishop of Madrid, if not a member of the Standing Commission for another title. Statutes of the Spanish Episcopal Conference, Articles 18 and 19.

Thus, members of the Standing Committee will be members of the Executive Committee and the chairmen of the committees that are:

- Ricardo Blázquez Pérez, Archbishop of Valladolid (President).
- Antonio Cañizares Llovera, Archbishop of Valencia (Vice President).
- José María Gil Tamayo, (Secretary General).
- Carlos Osoro Sierra, Archbishop of Madrid (President of the Lay Apostolate EC).
- Juan del Rio Martin, Archbishop Military of Spain (member of Executive Committee).
- Juan José Asenjo Pelegrina, Archbishop of Seville (Executive Committee member).
- Julián Barrio Barrio, Archbishop of Santiago de Compostela (Executive Committee member).
- Francisco Pérez González, Archbishop of Pamplona and Tudela (Executive Committee member).
- Jesus E. Ibanez Catala, Bishop of Málaga (President of the EC of the Clergy).
- Adolfo Gonzalez Montes, Bishop of Almería (President of the EC for the Doctrine of the Faith).
- Ginés Ramón García Beltrán, Bishop of Guadix (President of the European Education and Catechesis).
- Juan José Omella Omella, Archbishop of Barcelona (President of the EC Liturgy).
- Javier Salinas Viñals, Auxiliary Bishop of Valencia (President of the EC Social Media).
- Ciriaco Benavente Mateos, Bishop of Albacete (President of the European Migration).
- Braulio Rodríguez Plaza, Archbishop of Toledo (President of the EC Mission and Cooperation between the Churches).
- Sebastia Taltavull Anglada, Auxiliary Bishop of Barcelona (Chairman of the Pastoral EC).
- Celso Morga Iruzubieta, Archbishop of Mérida-Barajoz (Chairman of the Social Pastoral EC).
- Jesus Garcia Burillo, Bishop of Avila (President of the European Cultural Heritage).
- Francisco Javier Martinez Fernandez, Archbishop of Granada (President of the Interfaith Relations EC).
- Joan Enric Vives Sicília, Bishop of Urgell (President of the European Commission for Seminaries and Universities).
- Julián López Martín, Bishop of León (President of the EC for Consecrated Life).
- Fidel Herráez Vegas, Archbishop of Burgos (Representative of the Ecclesiastical Province of Burgos).
- Vicente Jiménez Zamora, Archbishop of Zaragoza (Representative of the Ecclesiastical Province of Zaragoza).

== Plenary Assembly ==
The Plenary Assembly is the supreme organ of the Episcopal Conference, and is composed of all members of the same. are full members of the Conference: The archbishops and diocesan bishops, Archbishop Military, Archbishops and Bishops Coadjutor and Auxiliary Managers and Administrators Diocesan Apostolic, and the Archbishops and Bishops emeriti members and to play a distinctive role in the national level, entrusted by the Holy See or the Episcopal Conference. Statutes of the Spanish Episcopal Conference, Article 8 § 1 and 2. List of members of the Plenary Assembly.

Territorially, the system diocese of the Catholic Church of Spain divides the country into 70 dioceses (14 of them Archdiocese), each headed by a bishop (or Archbishop). These, in turn, meet in fourteen ecclesiastical provinces, each in charge of their respective archbishop.

== List of Spanish dioceses ==
For complete information regarding the dioceses of Spain (address, phone, website, email address and name of the bishop) can read the List of the Roman Catholic dioceses of Spain

== Ownership ==
Maximum shareholders Radio Popular SA (COPE, Cadena 100).
Sole shareholder of national television network 13tv.
