= Carlos Osoro Sierra =

Spanish Roman Catholic prelate (born 1945)

His Eminence Carlos Osoro Sierra
- Cardinal, Archbishop Emeritus of Madrid
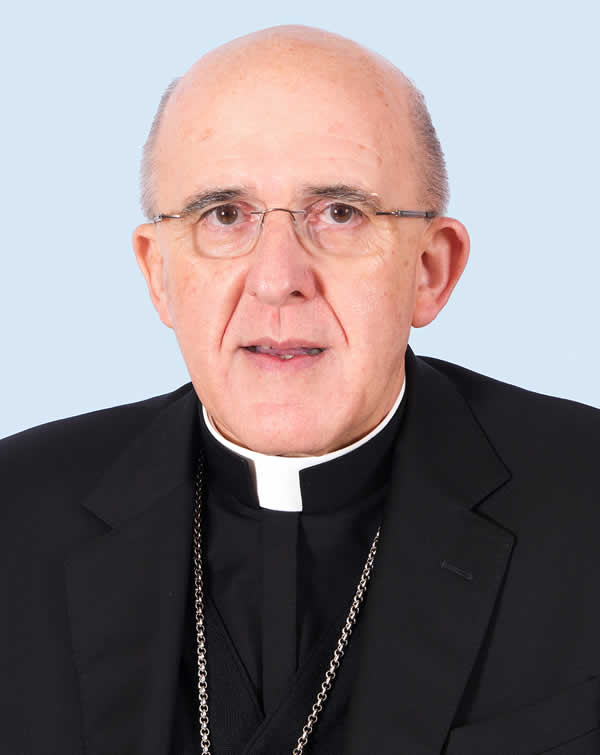
- Church: Catholic Church
- Archdiocese: Madrid
- See: Madrid
- Appointed: 28 August 2014
- Installed: 25 October 2014
- Term ended: 12 June 2023
- Predecessor: Antonio María Rouco Varela
- Successor: José Cobo Cano
- Other posts: Vice-President of the Spanish Episcopal Conference (2014–); Ordinary for the Faithful of Eastern Rite in Spain (2016–); Cardinal-Priest of Santa Maria in Trastevere (2016–)
- Previous posts: Bishop of Ourense (1997–2002); Archbishop of Oviedo (2002–2009); Apostolic Administrator of Santander (2006–2007); Apostolic Administrator of Oviedo (2009); Archbishop of Valencia (2009–2014)

Orders
- Ordination: 29 July 1973 by Juan Antonio del Val Gallo
- Consecration: 22 February 1997 by Lajos Kada
- Created cardinal: 19 November 2016 by Pope Francis
- Rank: Cardinal-Priest

Personal details
- Born: Carlos Osoro Sierra; 16 May 1945 (age 81) Castañeda, Cantabria, Spain
- Motto: Per Christum et cum ipso et in ipso (Through Him and with Him and in Him)
- Signature: Carlos Osoro Sierra's signature

- Coat of arms: Carlos Osoro Sierra's coat of arms

Ordination history of Carlos Osoro Sierra
History
Episcopal consecration
- Principal consecrator: Lajos Kada
- Co-consecrators: Julián Barrio Barrio; José Dieguez Reboredo
Cardinalate
- Elevated by: Pope Francis
Episcopal succession
Bishops consecrated by Carlos Osoro Sierra as principal consecrator
- Cecilio Raúl Berzosa Martinez: 14 May 2005
- José Cobo Cano: 17 February 2018

Styles of Carlos Osoro Sierra
- Reference style: His Eminence
- Spoken style: Your Eminence
- Religious style: Cardinal
- Informal style: Cardinal

Carlos Osoro Sierra (Spanish pronunciation: [ˈkaɾlos oˈsoɾo ˈsjera]; born 16 May 1945) is a Spanish prelate of the Catholic Church who was Archbishop of Madrid from 2014 to 2023. He has been a bishop since 1997 and a cardinal since 2016.

== Life ==
Osoro was born in Castañeda in northern Spain on 16 May 1945. He studied at the Escuela Normal and taught for a year in Santander. He then entered the seminary for adult vocations in Salamanca, earning licentiates in theology and philosophy at the Pontifical University of Salamanca. He later obtained a licentiate in Exact Sciences from the Complutense University of Madrid and another in pedagogy from the University of Salamanca. He was ordained a priest on 29 July 1973 by Bishop Juan Antonio de Val Gallo.

He worked in a parish in Torrelavega from 1973 to 1976. He then held diocesan positions: Secretary General, Episcopal Delegate for vocations and seminaries, Episcopal Delegate for the apostolate of the laity and Vicar for pastoral care from 1976 to 1996; rector of the diocesan seminary from 1977 to 1996; vicar general from 1978 to 1992; and president of the Cathedral Chapter from 1993 to 1996.

Pope John Paul II named him Bishop of Orense on 27 December 1996 and he received his episcopal consecration on 22 February 1997 from the Apostolic Nuncio to Spain Archbishop Lajos Kada. Osoro was appointed Archbishop of Oviedo on 7 January 2002 and he was installed there on 23 February. Within the Spanish Episcopal Conference he was president of the Commission for the Clergy from 1999 to 2005. Pope Benedict XVI named him Archbishop of Valencia on 8 January 2009 and he was installed there on 18 April. He was apostolic administrator of the Diocese of Santander from September 2006 to September 2007.

Pope Francis named him Archbishop of Madrid on 28 August 2014. Osoro Sierra is considered to be an orthodox prelate known for his pastoral sensitivities. He participated in the synod on the family in October 2015 as one of three delegates elected by the Spanish Episcopal Conference and Pope Francis included him among the members of the Ordinary Council of the General Secretariat of the Synod of Bishops he named in November.

Pope Francis announced that he would elevate Osoro Sierra to the rank of cardinal on 19 November 2016, where he was made Cardinal-Priest of Santa Maria in Trastevere. Francis made him a member of the Congregation for Catholic Education on 23 December 2017.

Pope Francis has referred to Osoro Sierra as "Don Carlos the pilgrim", alluding to the cardinal's frequent walks around his archdiocese during which he mingles with the people to get to know them better. He has made religious vocations one of his chief priorities and in Valencia the number of seminarians grew from 51 in 2012 to 61 in 2013 due to his efforts. Upon his arrival in Madrid, he planned to launch a diocesan plan for evangelisation to reach out to those cut off from the Church and to renew vigour in the Christian faith. He invites adolescents to join him at the start of each month for a vigil in which to dialogue with them to understand their needs and concerns, and he often celebrates Mass in prisons. Osoro Sierra also visited cloistered convents when he arrived in Madrid.

Osoro Sierra was once asked whether he would define himself as a liberal or conservative prelate. But he insisted that he was "a man of the Church" and not one of the labels which seek to distract the Church's work.

Despite some news reports in April 2016 that Osoro had prohibited Cardinal Gerhard Müller from discussing his book at a Madrid college because Osoro deemed it "against the pope", Osoro welcomed Müller to a discussion of the book on 3 May at the Universidad Francisco de Vitoria, a Roman Catholic university in Madrid.

Pope Francis named him a member of the Congregation for the Oriental Churches on 6 August 2019 and of the Pontifical Commission for Latin America on 10 March 2021.

Pope Francis accepted his resignation as archbishop of Madrid on 12 June 2023. He was the oldest cardinal elector in the 2025 papal conclave.

Catholic Church titles
Preceded by José Diéguez Reboredo	Bishop of Ourense; 27 December 1996 – 7 January 2002	Succeeded by Luis Quinteiro Fiuza
Preceded by Gabino Díaz Merchán	Archbishop of Oviedo; 7 January 2002 – 8 January 2009	Succeeded by Jesús Sanz Montes
Preceded by Agustín García-Gasco y Vicente	Archbishop of Valencia; 8 January 2009 – 25 October 2014	Succeeded by Antonio Cañizares Llovera
Preceded by Ricardo Blázquez Pérez	Vice-President of the Spanish Episcopal Conference; 12 March 2014 – 14 March 2017	Succeeded by Antonio Cañizares Llovera
Preceded by Antonio María Rouco Varela	Archbishop of Madrid; 25 October 2014 – 12 June 2023	Succeeded by José Cobo Cano
Position created	Ordinary for the Faithful of Eastern Rite in Spain; 6 June 2016 –	Incumbent
Preceded by Loris Francesco Capovilla	Cardinal-Priest of Santa Maria in Trastevere; 19 November 2016 –	Incumbent
Preceded by Antonio Cañizares Llovera	Vice-President of the Spanish Episcopal Conference; 3 March 2020 –	Incumbent
