= Cincari =

Roman era civitas of Africa Proconsularae

Cincari was a Roman era civitas of Africa Proconsularae a town which has been tentatively identified with the ruins of Henchir Tengar in today's northern Tunisia. The ruins at Bordj Toum have also been proposed as an alternative for the town.

The ruins at Henchir Tengar include temples, but the site is best known for its theatre.

The Christian church was a reused Roman baths. but had four apses. and a martyrium.

The city also had one of only two known septizodia. The only other known such structure was found on Palatine Hill, Rome. The function of the structure remains unknown, though it may be cultic.

The city was also the seat of an ancient Christian bishopric known only through ecclesiastical documents. It was an ancient episcopal see of the Roman province of Africa Proconsularis and was a suffragan of Archdiocese of Carthage.

Only two bishops of this ancient episcopal see are known. At the Conference of Carthage (411), the town was represented by the Catholic bishop Restitutus, and the Donatist bishop Campano. Today Cincari survives as titular bishopric and the current bishop is Frumencio Escudero Arenas, of Puyo.

== Bishops ==
- Manuel Castro Ruiz (July 21, 1965 – September 20, 1969 )
- Ricardo Blanco Granda (November 17, 1969 – August 2, 1986)
- Roger Francis Crispian Hollis (February 13, 1987 – December 6, 1988)
- José Andrés Corral Arredondo (January 16, 1989 – July 11, 1992)
- Frumencio Escudero Arenas, from 6 October 1992
