= Antonio María Rouco Varela =

Spanish cardinal

His Eminence Antonio Rouco Varela
- Cardinal, Archbishop emeritus of Madrid
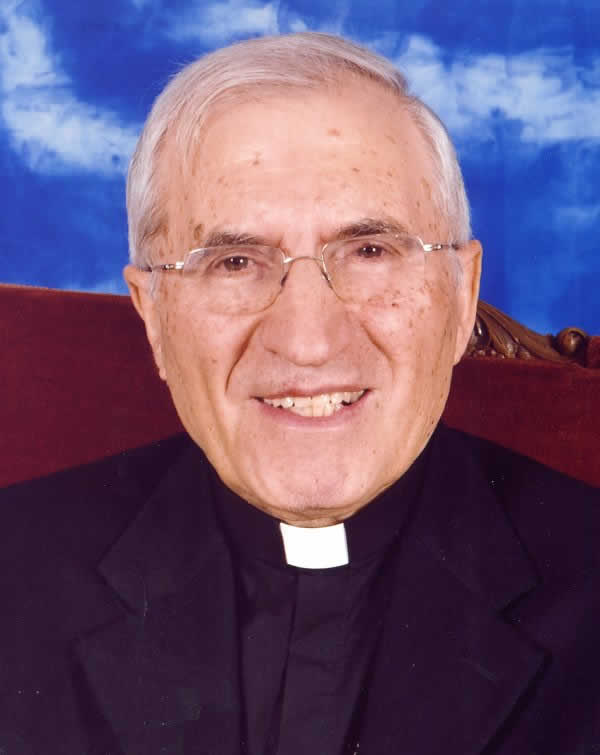
- Antonio María Rouco Varela
- Archdiocese: Madrid
- Appointed: 28 July 1994
- Term ended: 28 August 2014
- Predecessor: Angel Suquía Goicoechea
- Successor: Carlos Osoro Sierra
- Other post: Cardinal-Priest of San Lorenzo in Damaso
- Previous posts: Auxiliary Bishop of Santiago de Compostela (1976–1984); Titular Bishop of Gergis (1976–1984); Archbishop of Santiago de Compostela (1984–1994); President of the Spanish Episcopal Conference

Orders
- Ordination: 28 March 1959 by Angel Suquía Goicoechea
- Consecration: 31 October 1976 by Maximino Romero de Lema
- Created cardinal: 21 February 1998 by Pope John Paul II
- Rank: Cardinal Priest

Personal details
- Born: Antonio María Rouco Varela; 20 August 1936 (age 89) Vilalba, Spain
- Motto: In ecclesiae communione
- Coat of arms

Styles of Antonio Rouco Varela
- Reference style: His Eminence
- Spoken style: Your Eminence
- Religious style: Cardinal
- Informal style: Cardinal
- See: Madrid

Antonio María Rouco Varela (born 20 August 1936) is a Spanish Catholic prelate who served as Archbishop of Madrid from 1994 to 2014. He was made a cardinal in 1998. Rouco was president of the Episcopal Conference of Spain from 1999 to 2005 and again from 2008 to 2014.

== Biography ==
Antonio Rouco Varela was born in Vilalba (province of Lugo) to Vicente Rouco and María Eugenia Varela, the latter of whom was from Bahía Blanca, Argentina. He has four siblings. He studied at the seminary in Mondoñedo and at the Pontifical University of Salamanca (1954–1958), from where he obtained his licentiate in theology. Rouco was ordained to the priesthood by Bishop Francisco Barbado y Viejo, OP, on 28 March 1959.

He then furthered his studies at LMU Munich, obtaining a doctorate in canon law in 1964 with a dissertation on church-state relations in 16th century Spain. He held a series of academic posts, teaching fundamental theology, canon law, and ecclesiastical law at the seminary of Mondoñedo, and LMU Munich. In 1976, he was appointed titular Bishop of Gergi and Auxiliary bishop of the Archdiocese of Santiago de Compostela by Pope Paul VI. Named Archbishop of Santiago de Compostela in 1984 by Pope John Paul II, he played a key role in the hosting of the 4th World Youth Day in 1989. Five years later, in 1994, he was named Archbishop of Madrid by Pope John Paul II.

During his time at the head of the Archdiocese of Madrid, Rouco Varela officiated at numerous royal family events, such as the wedding of Prince Felipe and Letizia Ortiz and the baptism of their daughters, Leonor, Princess of Asturias, and Sofia, Infanta of Spain.

John Paul II created him Cardinal-Priest of S. Lorenzo in Damaso in the consistory of 21 February 1998. He was one of the cardinal electors who participated in the 2005 papal conclave that selected Pope Benedict XVI. In 2011, he was the incumbent Cardinal Archbishop of Madrid, when Pope Benedict XVI made a Papal Visit to the city for World Youth Day 2011. Also that year, the University of "San Dámaso" was founded in Madrid. Rouco Varela again was a cardinal elector in the papal conclave that elected Pope Francis in March 2013.

On 28 August 2014 he was replaced as Archbishop of Madrid by Carlos Osoro Sierra. Having passed 80, he would no longer have a vote in a conclave.

== Views ==
=== Abortion and marriage ===
He led the opposition to the Socialist Spanish government over abortion and same-sex marriage.

=== Church architecture ===
During his tenure as Cardinal Archbishop of Madrid, he had the Neo-Gothic Almudena Cathedral decorated with paintings by Neocatechumenal artist Kiko Argüello and mosaics by Father Marko Ivan Rupnik.

Catholic Church titles
Preceded by Luigi Oldani	— TITULAR — Titular Bishop of Gergis; 17 September 1976 – 9 May 1984	Succeeded by Patricio Infante Alfonso
Preceded by Angel Suquía Goicoechea	Archbishop of Santiago de Compostela; 9 May 1984 – 28 July	Succeeded by Julián Barrio Barrio
Preceded by Angel Suquía Goicoechea	Archbishop of Madrid; 28 July 1994 – 28 August 2014	Succeeded by Carlos Osoro Sierra
Preceded by Narciso Jubany Arnau	Cardinal Priest of San Lorenzo in Damaso; 21 February 1998 –	Incumbent
