= Roman Catholic Diocese of Tudela =

Former Roman Catholic diocese in Spain

The Catholic Diocese of Tudela was a modern Latin bishopric with see in Tudela, Navarre, northern Spain, which existed 1783–1851 and again 1889–1956, each time being split off from the Pamplona see or reunited with it.

== History ==
- Established on 27 March 1783 as Diocese of Tudela / Tudelen(sis) (Latin), on territory split off from the Roman Catholic Diocese of Pamplona.
- Suppressed on 5 September 1851, territory and title merged (back) into the henceforth Diocese of Pamplona–Tudela.
- Restored on 17 July 1889 as Diocese of Tudela / Tudelen(sis) (Latin), split off again from Diocese of Pamplona–Tudela. It has often been vacant except for an apostolic administrator.
- On 11 July 1984 it was again effectively suppressed, but formally in personal union (aeque principaliter) with Pamplona y Tudela, so it kept its cathedral, which was not even relegated to co-cathedral.

== Episcopal ordinaries ==
=== Bishops of Tudela ===
- Francisco Ramón Larumbre (25 June 1784 – 1 September 1796, died)
- Simón Casaviella López (24 July 1797 – 30 March 1816, died)
- Juan Raimundo Santos Larumbe y Larrayoz (14 April 1817 – 3 October 1818)
- Ramón María Azpeitia de y Sáenz de Santamaria (29 March 1819 – 31 January 1844, died)

On 5 September 1851, Diocese of Tudela was suppressed, and its territory merged to the Diocese of Pamplona-Tudela

=== Apostolic administrators of Tudela ===
The Diocese of Tudela was restored on 17 July 1889. No bishop was appointed, and it was headed by apostolic administrators.

- Juan Soldevilla y Romero (17 July 1889 – 16 December 1901), Bishop of Tarazona
- José Maria Salvador y Barrera (16 December 1901 – 14 December 1905), Bishop of Tarazona
- Santiago Ozcoidi y Udave (14 December 1905 – 9 October 1916), Bishop of Tarazona
- Isidoro Badía y Sarradel (27 June 1917 – 1 October 1926), Bishop of Tarazona
- Isidro Gomá y Tomás (20 June 1927 - 12 April 1933), Bishop of Tarazona
- Nicanor Mutiloa e Irurita, C.SS.R. (1 May 1935 – 19 November 1946), Bishop of Tarazona
- Manuel Hurtado y García (24 April 1947 – 2 September 1955), Bishop of Tarazona
- Enrique Delgado y Gómez (2 September 1955 – 23 July 1968), Metropolitan Archbishop of Pamplona
- Arturo Tabera Araoz, C.M.F. (23 July 1968 – 4 December 1971), Metropolitan Archbishop of Pamplona
- José Méndez Asensio (3 December 1971 – 31 January 1978), Metropolitan Archbishop of Pamplona
- José María Cirarda Lachiondo (31 January 1978 – 11 August 1984), Metropolitan Archbishop of Pamplona

On 11 August 1984, the Diocese of Pamplona was united aeque principaliter with the Metropolitan Archdiocese of Pamplona.

== See also ==
- List of Catholic dioceses in Spain, Andorra, Ceuta and Gibraltar

== Sources and external links ==
- GCatholic, with Google satellite photo
