= Diocese of Getafe =

Roman Catholic diocese in Spain

Coordinates: 40.3042°N 3.7297°W

Diocese of Getafe Dioecesis Xetafensis Diócesis de Getafe

Catholic
- Coat of arms of Getafe

Location
- Country: Spain
- Ecclesiastical province: Madrid
- Metropolitan: Madrid

Statistics
- Area: 2,295 km^{2} (886 sq mi)
- Population: Total; Catholics: (as of 2006); 1,365,668; 1,229,101 (90.0%)

Information
- Rite: Latin Rite
- Cathedral: Cathedral of St. Mary Magdalene in Getafe
- Patron saint: Blessed Virgin Mary as "Our Lady of the Angels"

Current leadership
- Pope: Leo XIV
- Bishop: Ginés García Beltrán
- Metropolitan Archbishop: José Cobo Cano
- Auxiliary Bishops: José Rico Pavés

Map

Website
- Website of the Diocese

The Diocese of Getafe (Latin: Dioecesis Xetafensis) is a Latin ecclesiastical territory of the Catholic Church in Spain, part of the ecclesiastical province of the Archdiocese of Madrid. The seat is in the city of Getafe, in the Getafe Cathedral.

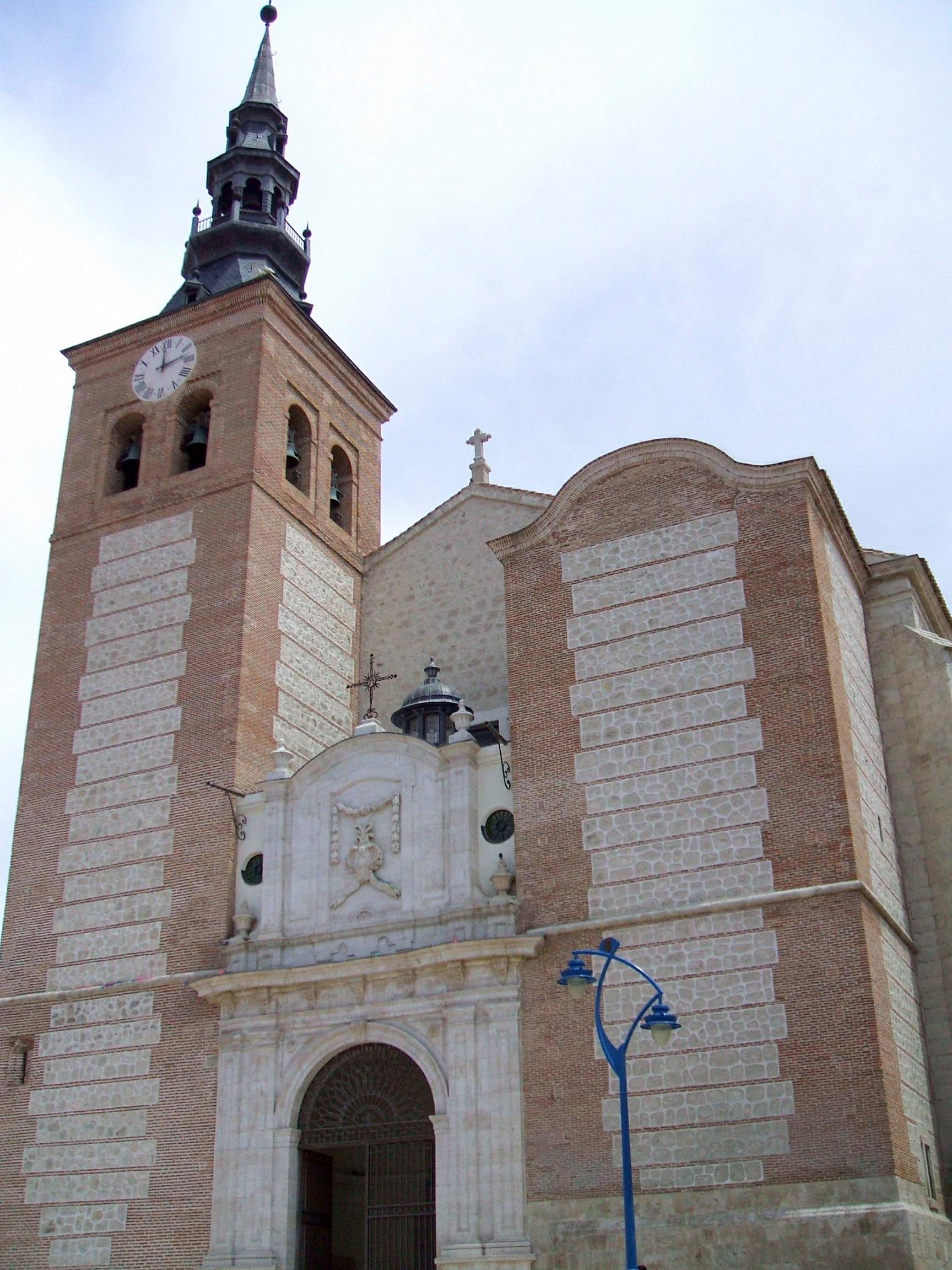
Getafe Cathedral

It was established on 23 July 1991, from the Roman Catholic Archdiocese of Madrid.

On 24 February 1998, Pope John Paul II issued the papal bull titled "A clero" declaring the Blessed Virgin Mary as "Our Lady of the Angels" as the patroness of the diocese, which has been a prominent devotion in the municipality and diocese since the 17th century. Her image was later honored with a canonical coronation by the same pope on 19 May 2002.

== Bishops ==
- Francisco José Pérez y Fernández-Golfin (23 July 1991 – 24 February 2004)
- Joaquín María López de Andújar y Cánovas del Castillo (29 October 2004 – 3 January 2018)
- Ginés Ramón García Beltrán (3 January 2018 – present)

== See also ==
- Roman Catholicism in Spain
