= José Cobo Cano =

Spanish Catholic bishop (born 1965)

His Eminence José Cobo Cano
- Cardinal, Metropolitan Archbishop of Madrid
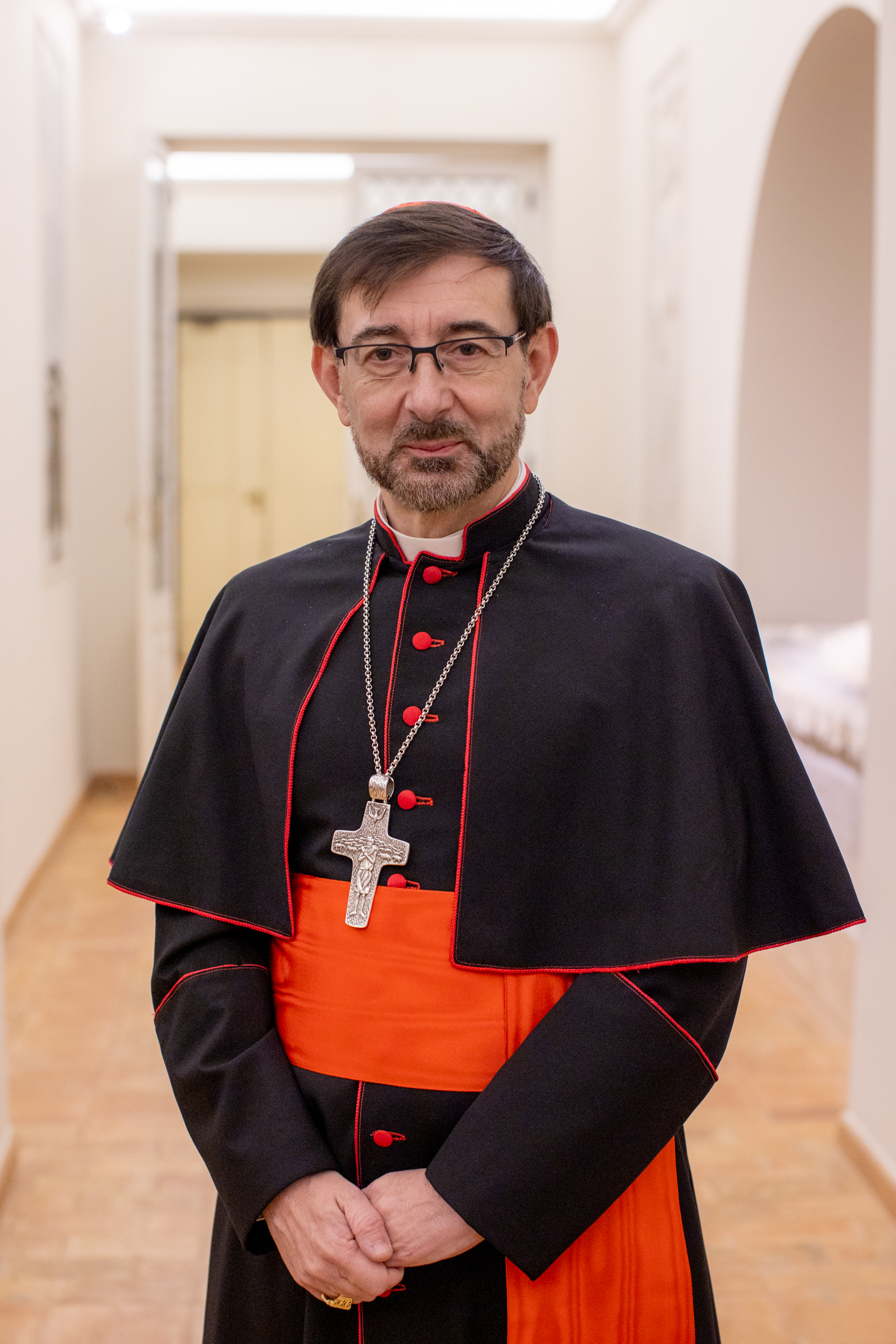
- Cardinal Cobo in 2024
- Church: Roman Catholic Church
- Archdiocese: Madrid
- See: Madrid
- Appointed: 12 June 2023
- Installed: 8 July 2023
- Predecessor: Carlos Osoro Sierra
- Other post: Cardinal-Priest of Santa Maria in Monserrato degli Spagnoli (2023–)
- Previous post: Auxiliary bishop of Archdiocese of Madrid (2018–23)

Orders
- Ordination: 23 April 1994 by Angel Suquía Goicoechea
- Consecration: 17 February 2018 by Carlos Osoro Sierra
- Created cardinal: 30 September 2023 by Pope Francis
- Rank: Cardinal Priest

Personal details
- Born: 20 September 1965 (age 61) Sabiote, Spain
- Denomination: Catholicism
- Education: Complutense University of Madrid; San Damaso Ecclesiastical University; Instituto Redentorista de Ciencias Morales
- Motto: In misericordia Tua, confidere et servire
- Styles
- Reference style: His Eminence
- Spoken style: Your Eminence
- Religious style: cardinal
- Informal style: Cardinal

José Cobo Cano (born 20 September 1965) is a Spanish Catholic prelate who has served as Archbishop of Madrid since 2023. He previously served as auxiliary bishop of the archdiocese. Pope Francis made him a cardinal in 2023.

Cobo became a priest in 1994 and was named an auxiliary bishop in 2017; after his ordination, he oversaw various social issue–related departments within the Spanish Episcopal Conference. Following a scandal about a case of sexual abuse by a teacher at an Opus Dei school, Cobo participated in a national meeting to address such cases within the Catholic Church.

His appointment as archbishop in 2023 drew controversy due to his limited experience—the previous five archbishops of Madrid had all been bishops in their own dioceses—and his progressive views. During an interview, Cobo sparked controversy when he stated that he would not officiate same-sex marriages, comparing the act to celebrating the Eucharist with Coca-Cola.

== Early life ==
José Cobo was born on 20 September 1965 in the municipality of Sabiote, Andalusia, where he was baptized in the Parochial Church of San Pedro. At 7 years old he went with his parents, Agustín and Pauli, to Madrid.

He earned a licentiate degree in civil law from the Complutense University of Madrid in 1988. The same year, he entered the Madrid Conciliary Seminary and San Damaso the same year, where he completed his ecclesiastical studies. He pursued moral science at the Comillas Pontifical University (1994–1996).

== Early priesthood ==
Cobo was ordained a priest of the archdiocese of Madrid on 23 April 1994 by Cardinal Ángel Suquía Goicoechea, Archbishop of Madrid.

He started his ministry as deputy at Hermandades del Trabajo de Madrid, a Catholic evangelist and social work organization (1994–1996). Afterwards, he was a vicar (1995–2000) and archpriest (2000) at the Parroquia de San Leopold. From 2000 to 2015, he was the parish priest of St. Alfonso María de Ligorio. Subsequently, he was made member of the Presbyteral Council, a group of priests that give advice to the ordinary of the church (2000–2012; 2015–2017). In 2001, he was nominated as archpriest of Nuestra Señora del Pilar de Campamento and served until 2015. He was a permanent member in the II Diocesan Synod of Madrid, a meeting focused on deliberating legislative matters, from 2002 to 2005. Later, he was appointed as vicar episcopal of the Vicaría Episcopal II Nordeste (2015–2017). He was a lecturer at Escuela de Agentes de Pastoral de Madrid (1996–2000) and Centro de Estudios Sociales de Cáritas Diocesana de Madrid (2000–2012).

== Auxiliary bishop ==
On 29 December 2017, Pope Francis appointed Cobo and two others auxiliary bishops of the Archdiocese of Madrid and named Cobo titular bishop of Baeza. He received his episcopal consecration on 17 February 2018 from Cardinal Carlos Osoro Sierra, Archbishop of Madrid.

He chose as his motto In misericordia Tua, confidere et servire (In Your mercy, trust and serve).

His ecclesiastical coat of arms symbolize four aspects of his life: the Cross with the Five Holy Wounds represent his faith; a bell his role in guiding the people of God; a wash-basin his service to others; and a broken wall with a star in the background the discovery of the Virgin of Almudena and his town's patron saint, the Virgin of the Star.

While an auxiliary bishop, he was responsible for the Prison Pastoral Care Department (2018–2021) in the Spanish Episcopal Conference, an institution to help organize the pastoral functions of the bishops. In the same institution he is a member of the Migration Department since 2019 and of the Episcopal Commission for Social Pastoral and Human Promotion since 2020.

In November 2018, a teacher at an Opus Dei school in Bilbao was discovered to have sexually abused a child from 2008 to 2010. Cobo talked with the victim's priest and then reported the incident to the school. The school trusted responded with a plan to relocate the teacher abroad. Cobo strongly objected and criticized this decision, stating that school officials lacked compassion for the victim and their parents. Cobo also called the bishop of Bilbao's handling of the situation "shameful". Eventually, the teacher was sentenced to 11 years in prison. This high-profile case led to a nationwide meeting addressing sexual abuse cases within the Catholic Church, in which Cobo participated.

== Archbishop ==
On 12 June 2023, Pope Francis named him to succeed Carlos Osiro Sierra as archbishop of Madrid. He took canonical possession of the Archdiocese on 8 July 2023 at the Cathedral of Santa María de Vitoria. On 29 June 2023, in a ceremony at St. Peter's Basilica he received the pallium. He was younger than usual for his role in Madrid, just 56. (Note: Diocesan archbishops and bishops are required to present their resignations at the age of 75.)

His appointment was not well received by Madrid's clergy due to his lack of administrative experience; the last five archbishops of Madrid had all been archbishops elsewhere before named to Madrid. Cobo's name was not among those sent by the Apostolic Nuncio to Spain to the Vatican, but was Pope Francis' personal choice. Cobo's work and progressive stance on such social issues as incarceration and migration are thought to have attracted Francis' attention. (Note: Francis himself had bean auxiliary bishop for less than six years when he became Archbishop of Buenos Aires.)

As archbishop, he was made member of the Executive Commission and the Permanent Commission of the Spanish Episcopal Conference in July 2023. That same month, Pope Francis announced plans to make him a cardinal, along with 20 others, at a papal consistory scheduled for 30 September. In that consistory, Pope Francis created him a cardinal-priest and assigned him to the titular church of Santa Maria in Monserrato degli Spagnoli.

In an interview after World Youth Day 2023 in Lisbon, Cobo criticized the church as being manipulated by "ideological interests" and as an instrument to win votes and reaffirm political positions. During an interview, José Cobo sparked controversy when he stated that he would not officiate same-sex marriages, comparing the concept of sacramental same-sex marriages to celebrating the Eucharist with Coca-Cola. Cobo participated as a cardinal elector in the 2025 papal conclave that elected Pope Leo XIV.

== See also ==
- Cardinals created by Francis
