= Julián Barrio Barrio =

Spanish priest

The Most Reverend Julián Barrio Barrio
- Emeritus Archbishop of Santiago de Compostela
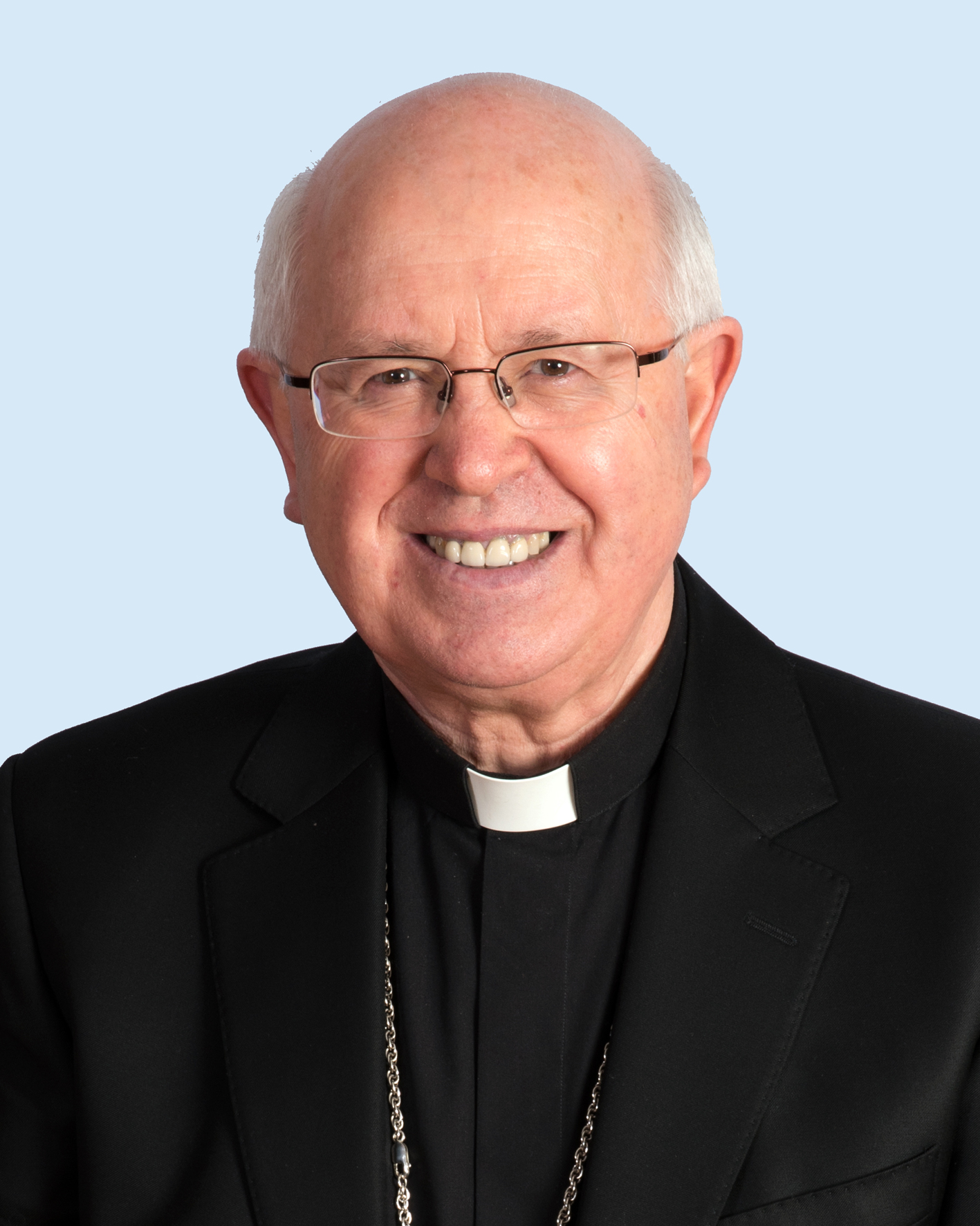
- Archbishop Barrio in 2017
- Church: Roman Catholic Church
- Archdiocese: Archdiocese of Santiago de Compostela
- Appointed: 5 January 1996
- Predecessor: Antonio María Rouco Varela
- Successor: Francisco José Prieto Fernández
- Other post: Auxiliary Bishop of Santiago de Compostela (1992–1996)

Orders
- Ordination: 4 July 1971 by Antonio Briva Mirabent
- Consecration: 7 February 1993 by Antonio María Rouco Varela

Personal details
- Born: 15 August 1946 (age 80) Manganeses de la Polvorosa, Zamora, Spain
- Denomination: Roman Catholicism
- Education: University of Oviedo; Pontifical University of Salamanca; Pontifical Gregorian University
- Motto: In Verbo Tuo Domine (I trust in your word, Lord)
- Coat of arms

Julián Barrio Barrio (born 15 August 1946) is a Spanish prelate of the Roman Catholic Church. He served as Archbishop of Santiago de Compostela between January 1996 and April 2023.

== Early life and education ==
Barrio was born on 15 August 1946 in Manganeses de la Polvorosa, Zamora, Spain. He studied geography and history at the University of Oviedo, and then studied theology at the Pontifical University of Salamanca. He also holds a doctorate in the history of the Church from the Pontifical Gregorian University.

== Ordained ministry ==
=== Priesthood ===
On 4 July 1971, Barrio was ordained a priest in the Roman Catholic Church by Antonio Briva Mirabent. He then served as a parish priest in the Diocese of Astorga. From 1980 to 1992, he was Vice-Rector of the diocese's seminary.

=== Episcopal ministry ===
On 31 December 1992, Barrio was appointed by Pope John Paul II as Auxiliary Bishop of the Archdiocese of Santiago de Compostela and Titular Bishop of Sasabe. He was consecrated as a bishop on 7 February 1993 during a Mass at the Cathedral of Santiago de Compostela. The principal consecrator was Antonio María Rouco Varela, assisted by Mario Tagliaferri and Antonio Briva Mirabent. On 5 January 1996, he was named by Pope John Paul II as the next Archbishop of Santiago de Compostela, retiring on 1 April 2023.

== See also ==
- Catholic Church in Spain
