= Church of Nuestra Señora de la Asunción (Meco) =

Cultural property in Meco, Spain

- Parroquia de Nuestra Señora de la Asunción (Spanish)
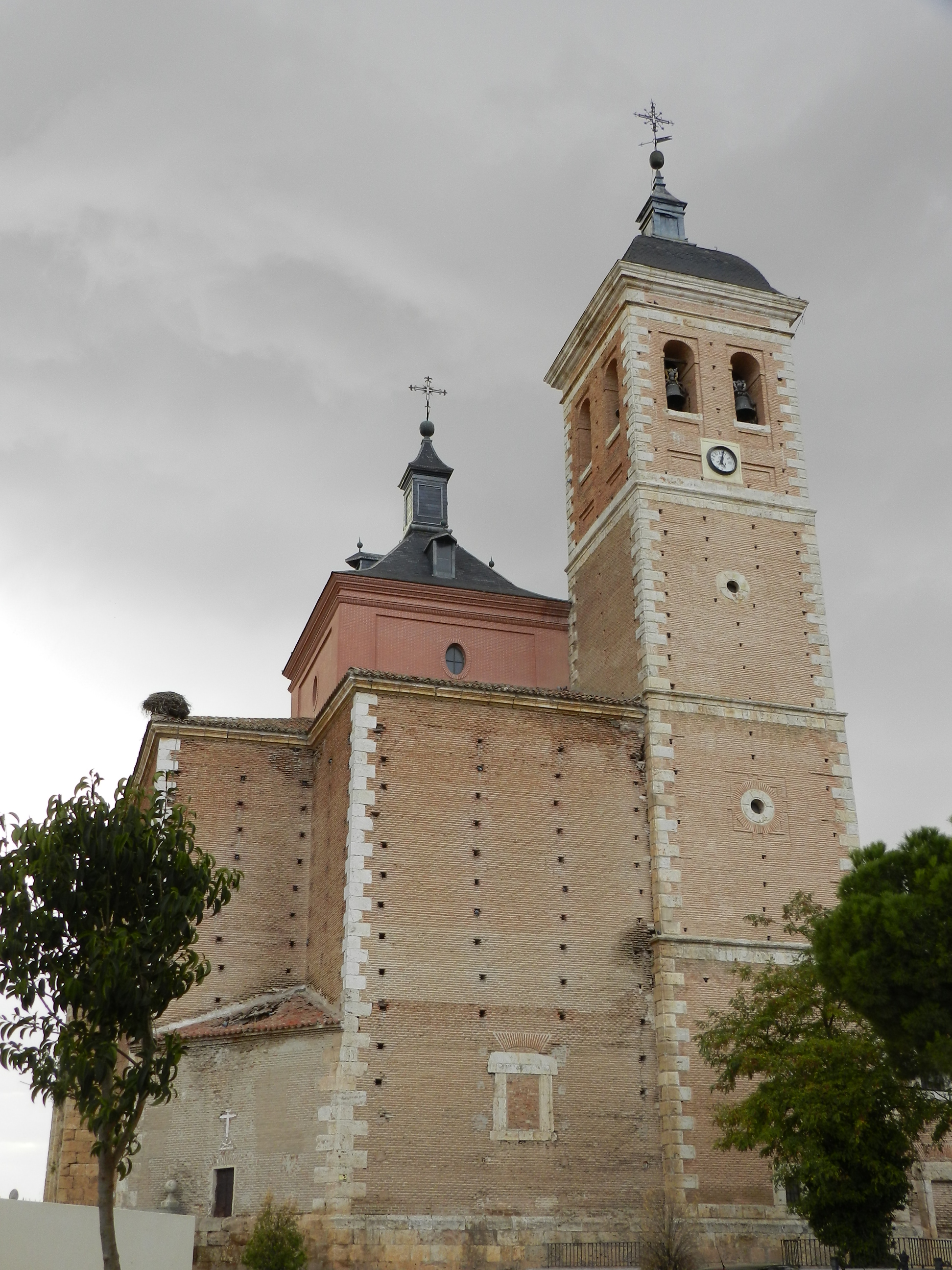

- Location within Spain
- 40.553633°N 3.329094°W
- Location: Meco, Spain

Spanish Cultural Heritage
- Official name: Parroquia de Nuestra Señora de la Asunción
- Type: Non-movable
- Criteria: Monument
- Designated: 1982
- Reference no.: RI-51-0004599

The Church of Nuestra Señora de la Asunción (Spanish: Parroquia de Nuestra Señora de la Asunción) is a church and parish in Meco, Spain. The church was added to the Bien de Interés Cultural registry in 1982.

== History ==
The church is thought to have existed before 1487, and part of the present church is known to have existed in 1568. Ambrosio de Morales recounts the arrival of the relics of Santos Justo y Pastor on their journey from Huesca to Alcalá de Henares. Some sources date the church's founding to 1548. Cantabrian architect Juan Ribero designed it from its conception to its completion before his death in 1598, and installed the tiles in the main chapel.

== Architecture ==
There is a clear influence from Diego de Siloe on Ribero's plant, columns and cover style, evident in de Siloe's 1528 Granada Cathedral. Ribero's church features Gothic columns and ribbed vaults.

The rectangular floor plan is divided into three parts (naves) of equal height, with the central nave wider than the surrounding two. The naves are separated by thick columns, topped with classical cornices and capitals. On them rest the late-Gothic roof ribs, with liernes over the aisles.

The first four sections of the church are stone. The dome and altar are brick, with limestone trim at the corners. There are four buttresses on each side. The 18th-century section of the dome was designed by Teodoro Ardemans, chief architect of Philip V. The cupola was built by Feliciano, Julian and Casimiro Cornejo, who built churches near Madrid, Toledo and Guadalajara in the second half of 18th century.

== Interior of the Temple ==
Next to the current input are two pools brief renaissance on Ionic pillars. The right aisle is dominated by the altarpiece of Santa Rita, baroque gilded Corinthian columns that flank it. Eight angels in various attitudes are at the top center space. On the altar, a painting depicting St. oval Pastor. On one side of the nave is the altar chapel dedicated to the Virgen del Carmen, with a gate of the 17th century and neoclassical altarpiece.

The Chapel, dedicated to the patron of the temple has a beautiful gilded altarpiece restored in the first decade of the century. The image of the Virgin, who occupied the center, and some angels disappeared because, at the beginning of Spanish Civil War (1936–39), suffered the ravages of people from the Popular Front government side. The whole is crowned by a great boost Trinity Baroque. At the bottom, under the niche they occupy the Assumption, a group formed by the Santos Justo y Pastor and another with the Church Fathers, St. Augustine and St. Gregory. Superb size, movement, and polychrome paintings reminiscent of Salzillo in Murcia. In the previous altarpiece of 1537, late Gothic style, there were 12 panel paintings that allude to the life of the Virgin and Jesus, of which 6 are preserved. It measures 1.20 m X 1 m approximately and all are works of Juan Correa de Vivar, which have been restored and declared of cultural interest. The tables are: the Annunciation, the Visitation, the Adoration of the Shepherds, Adoration of the Kings (here recognizes Charles V as King Gaspar), Veronica and The Descent.

The tabernacle used today is gold with enamel to reproduce the front of the Romanesque altar of Avia.

The wall of the left aisle there is another baroque altar dedicated to Mary Immaculate, angels fit the typical image. On the altar, on the wall we find another pair with the oval on the other side with a picture of San Justo. Below is the Sacristy keeping rich ornaments of worship.

In the nave are a 16th-century chapel closed with great wrought-iron railings. The left side of the chapel is occupied by a marble tomb that pervades the family crest and a Latin inscription: "Kidnapped by death", closed under marble lies Dr. Juan Gutierrez, besides the bones of their relatives. Was enlightened man in letters, adorned with all her doctrine. On the floor are two tombstones, one alluding to the same Doctor Juan Gutierrez Sanz, "father of the chapel, where he celebrated the feast of the Immaculate Conception over forty years and offered a lamp and founder."

== Pictures of the church ==
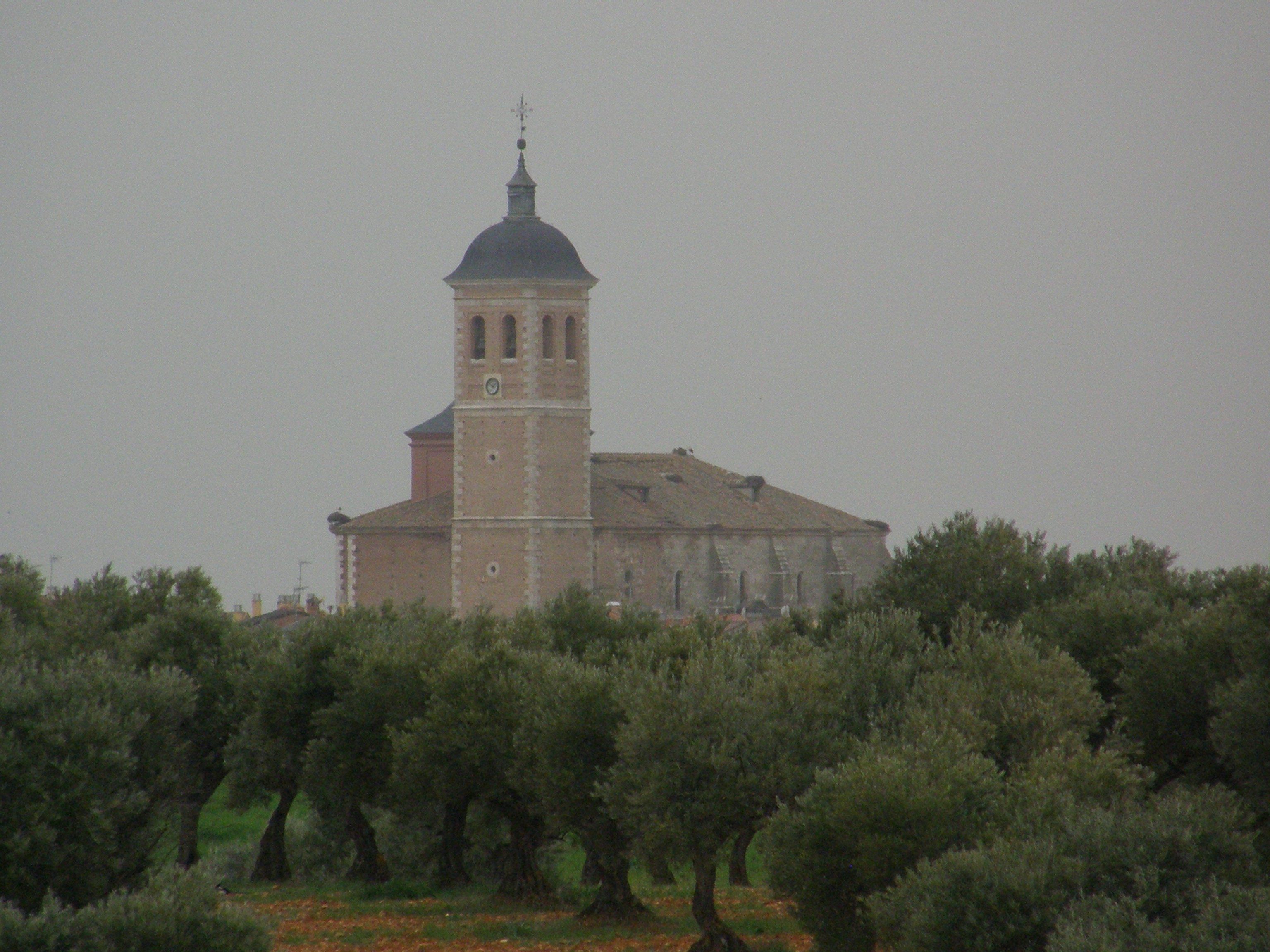
Church from Villanueva Road

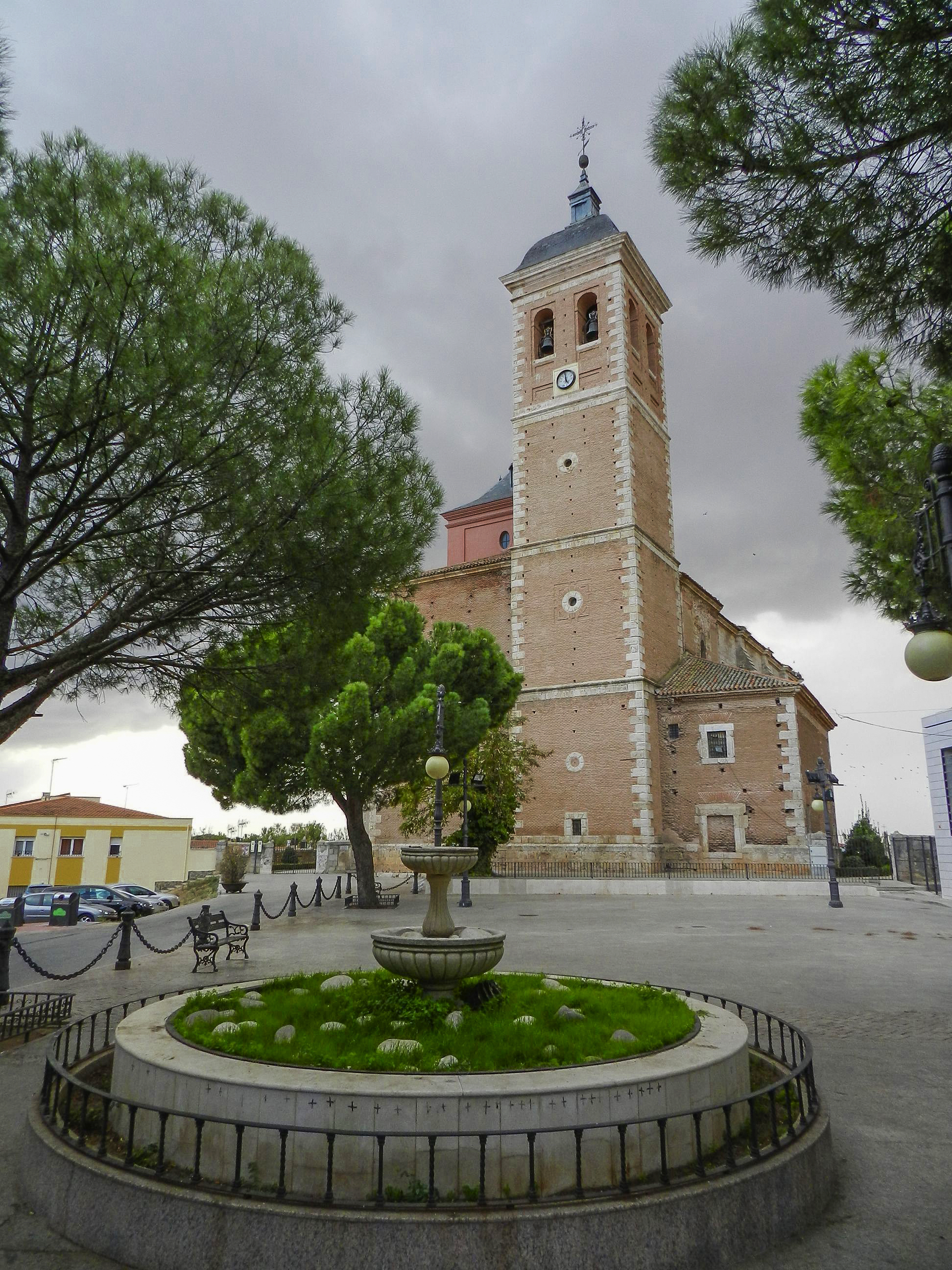
From the plaza

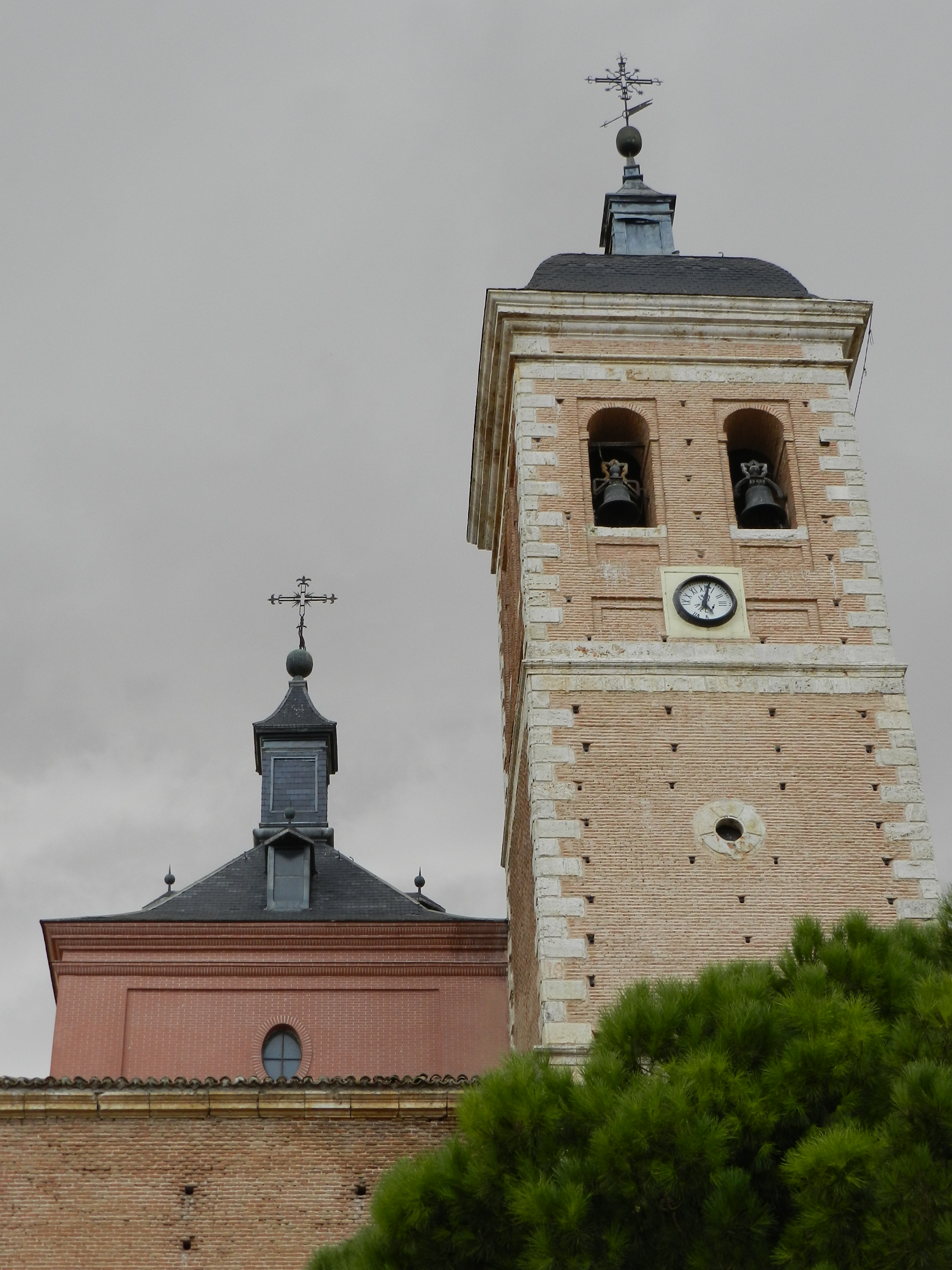
Towers, bells and dome

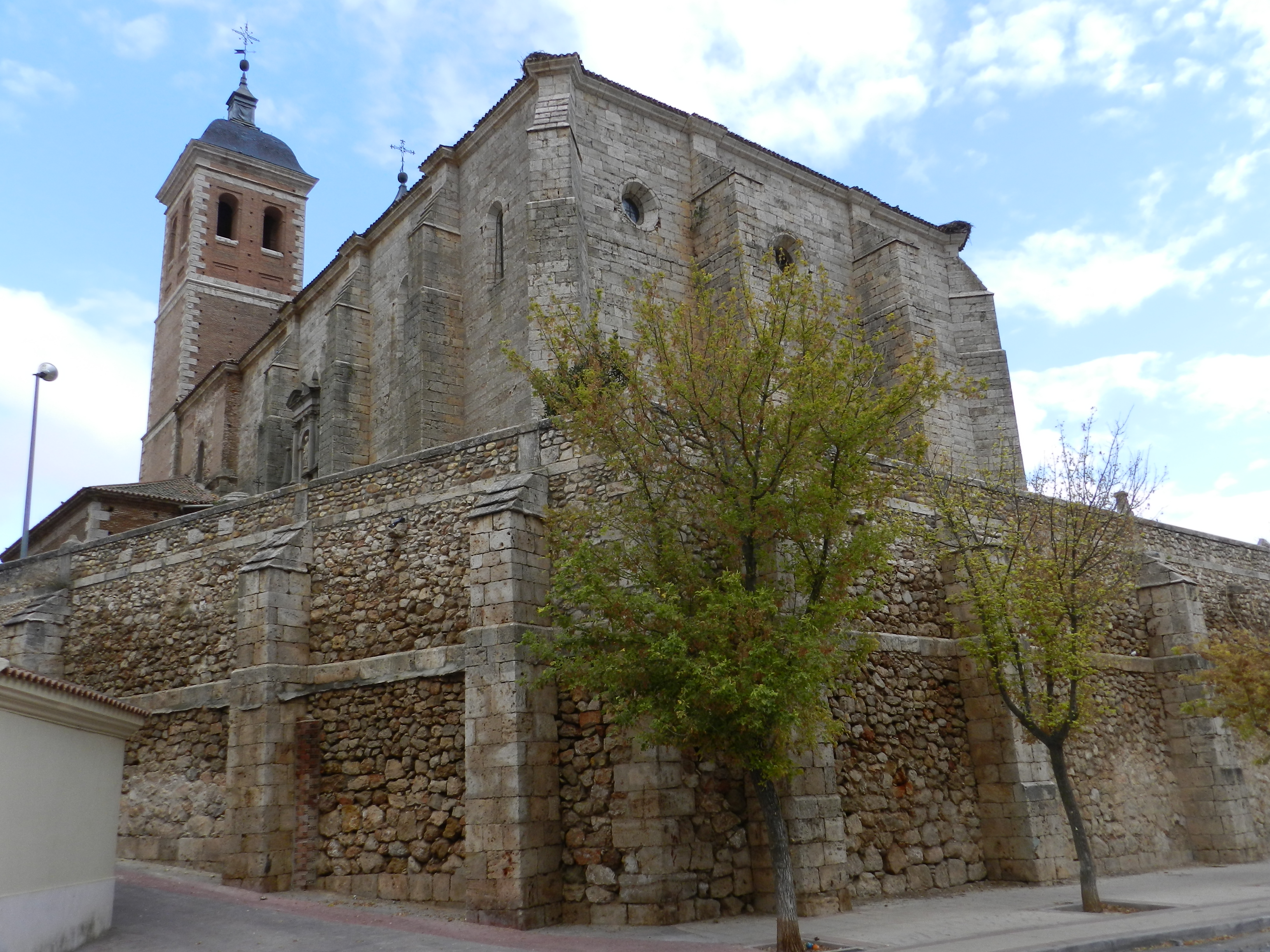
Northwest view

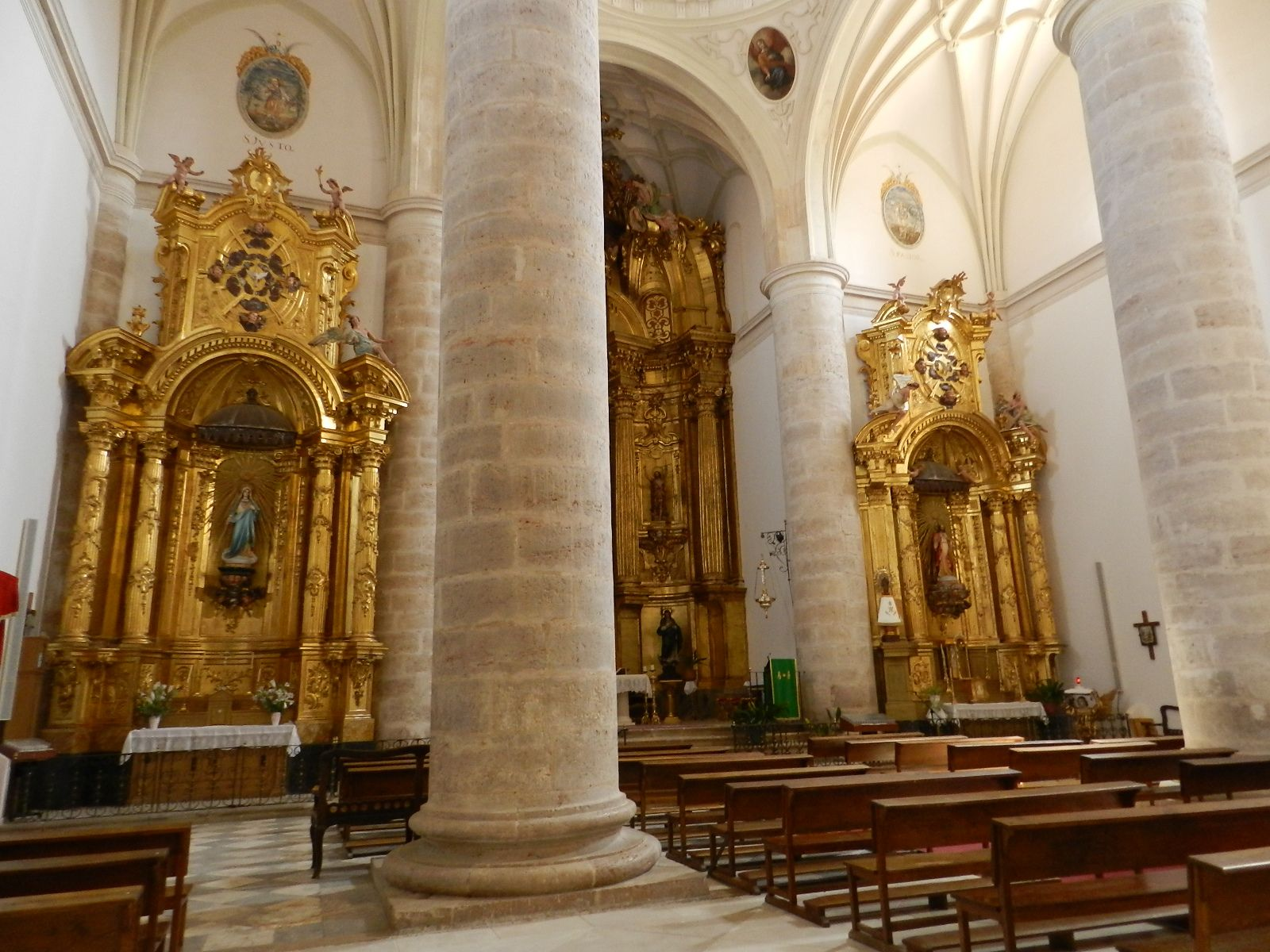
Interior

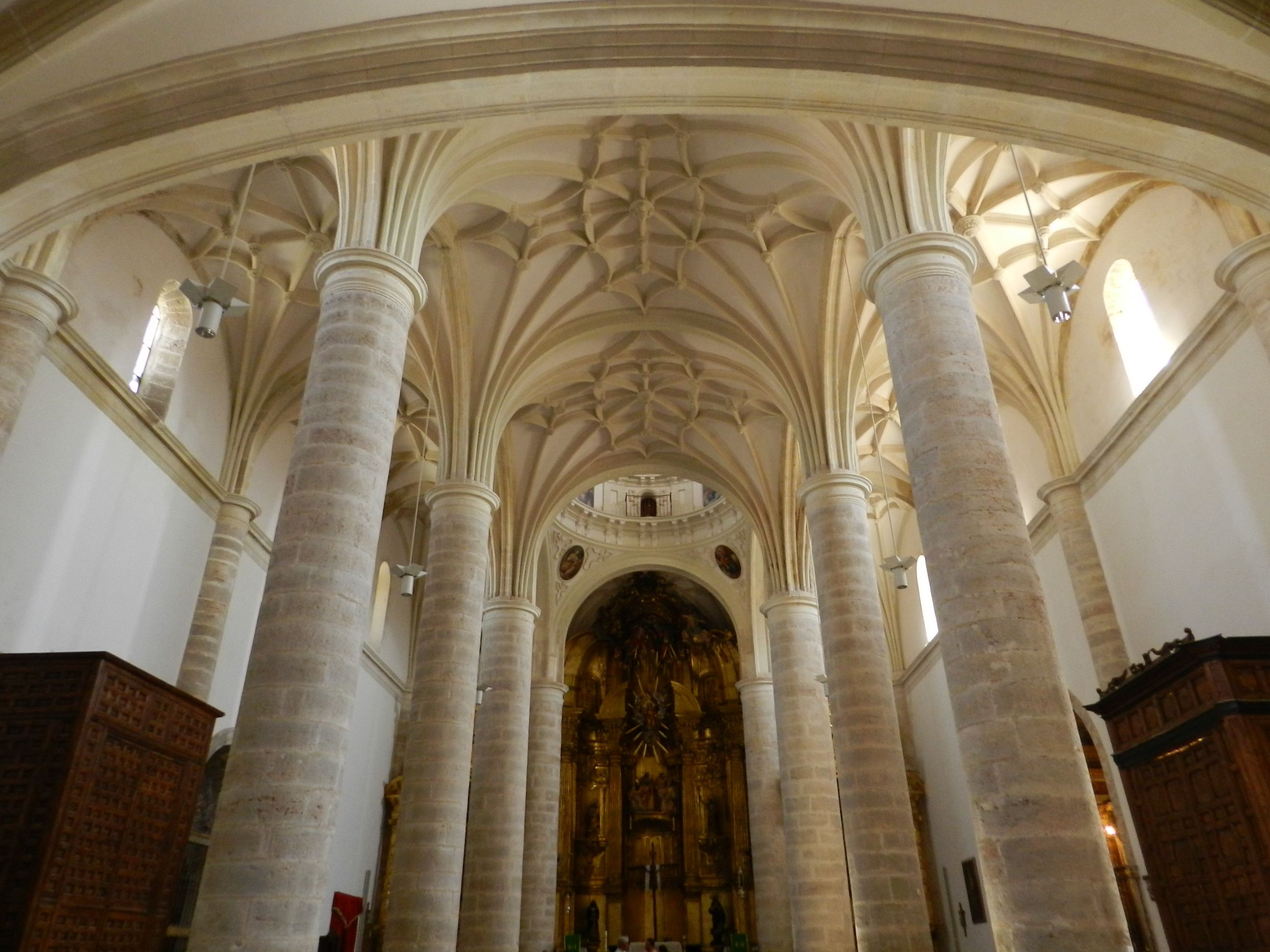
View towards main altar

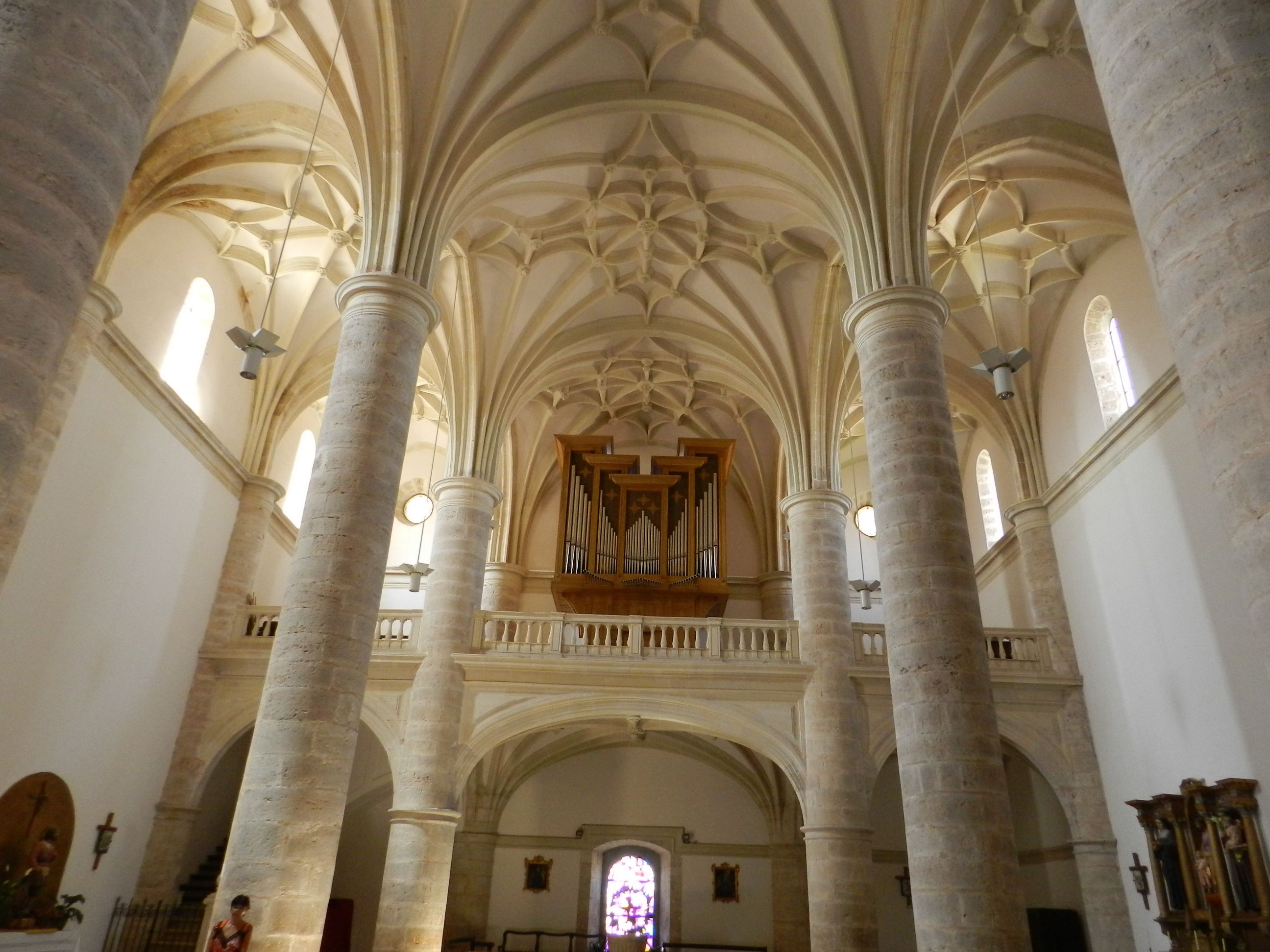
Towards choir loft

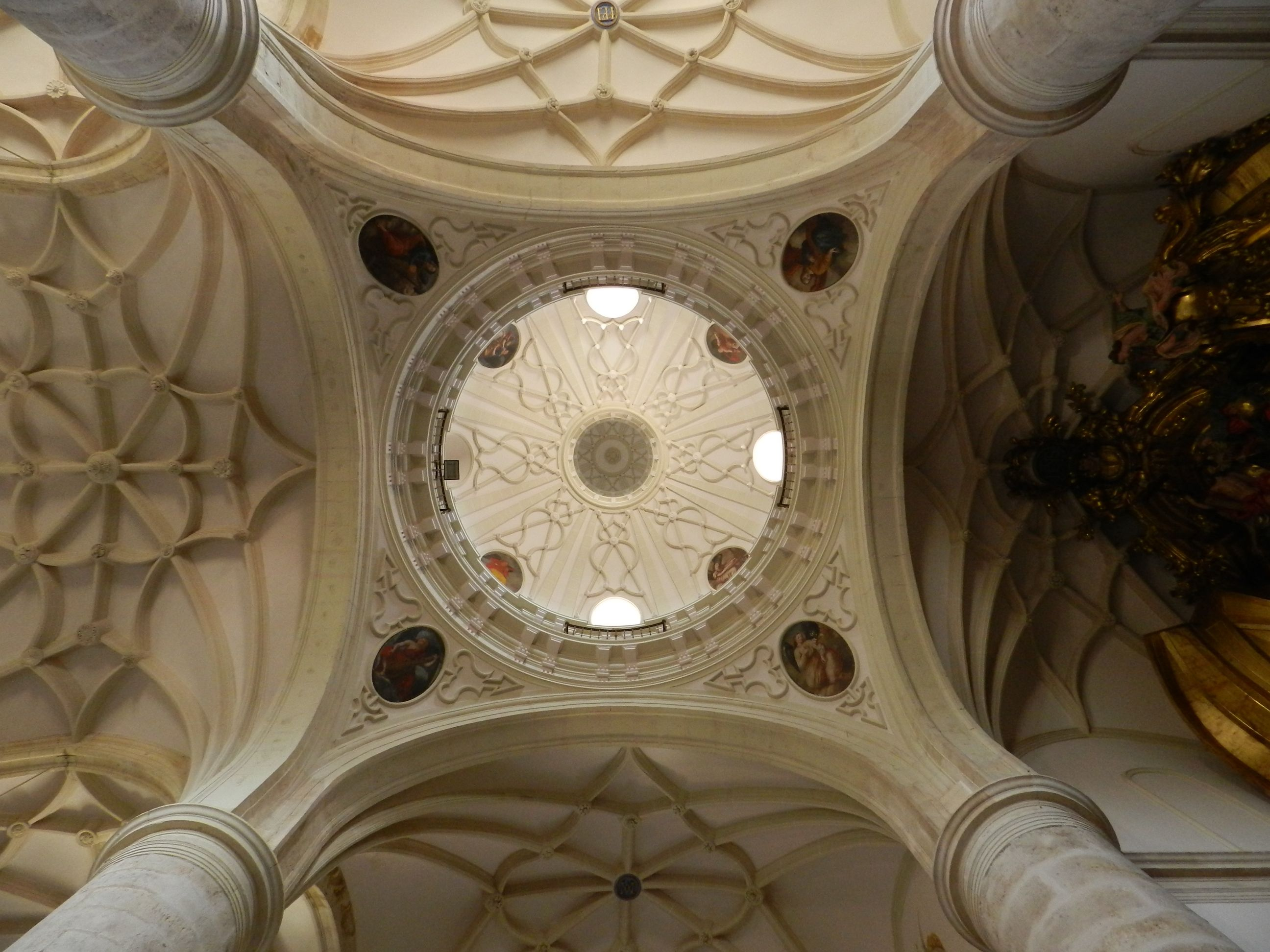
Dome, cross and pillars

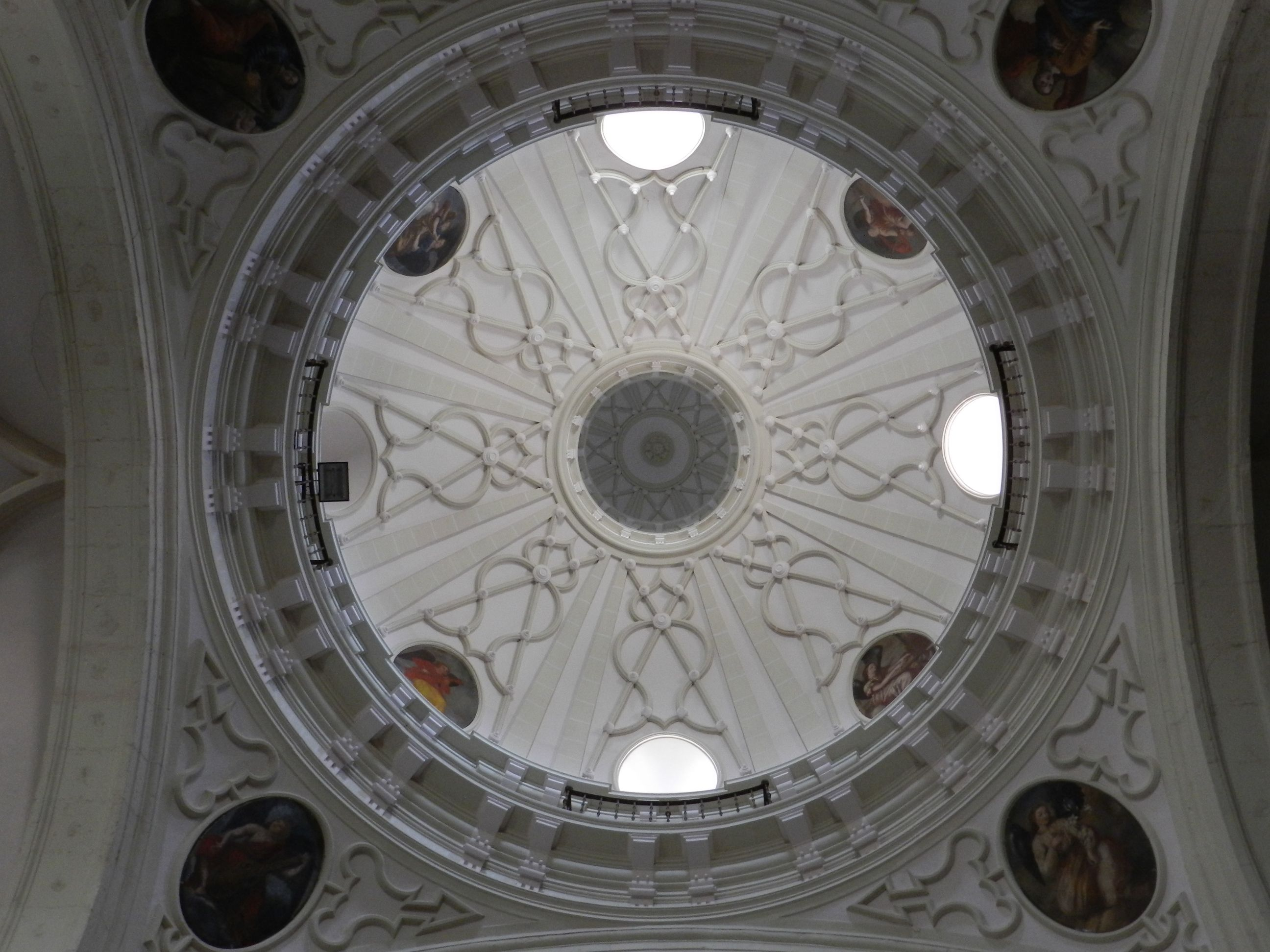
Interior view of the dome

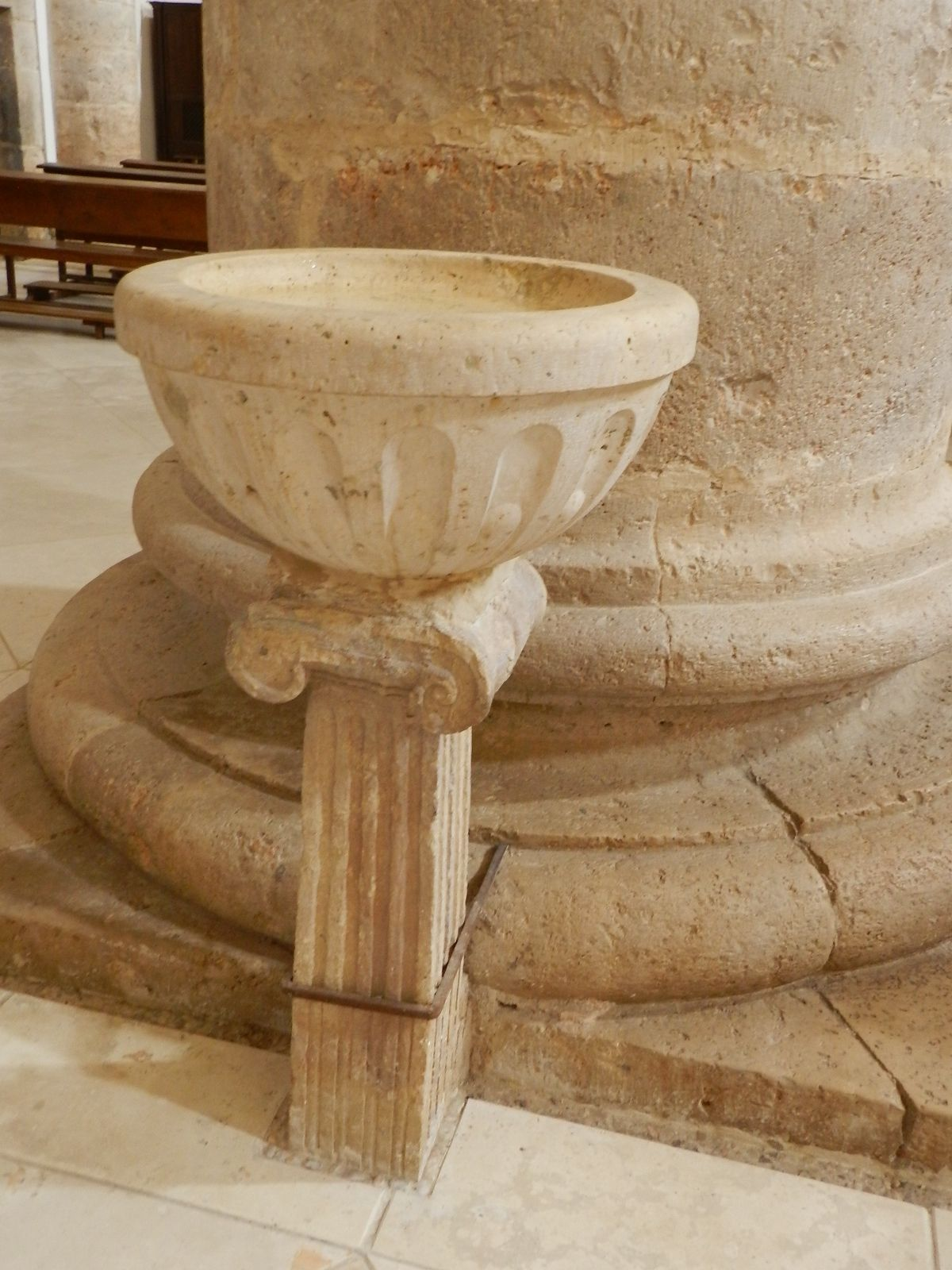
Spanish Renaissance holy water basin

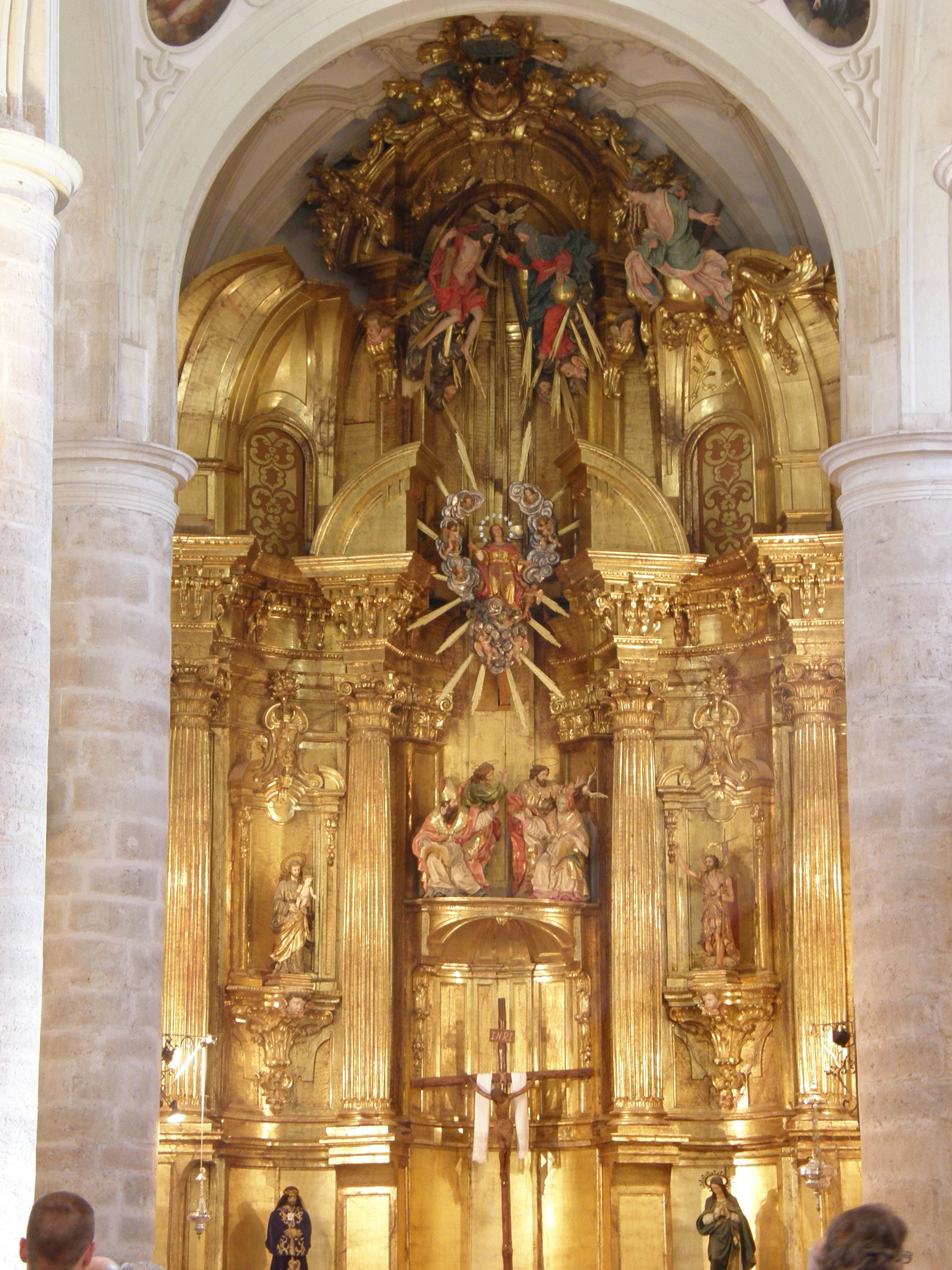
Main baroque altar

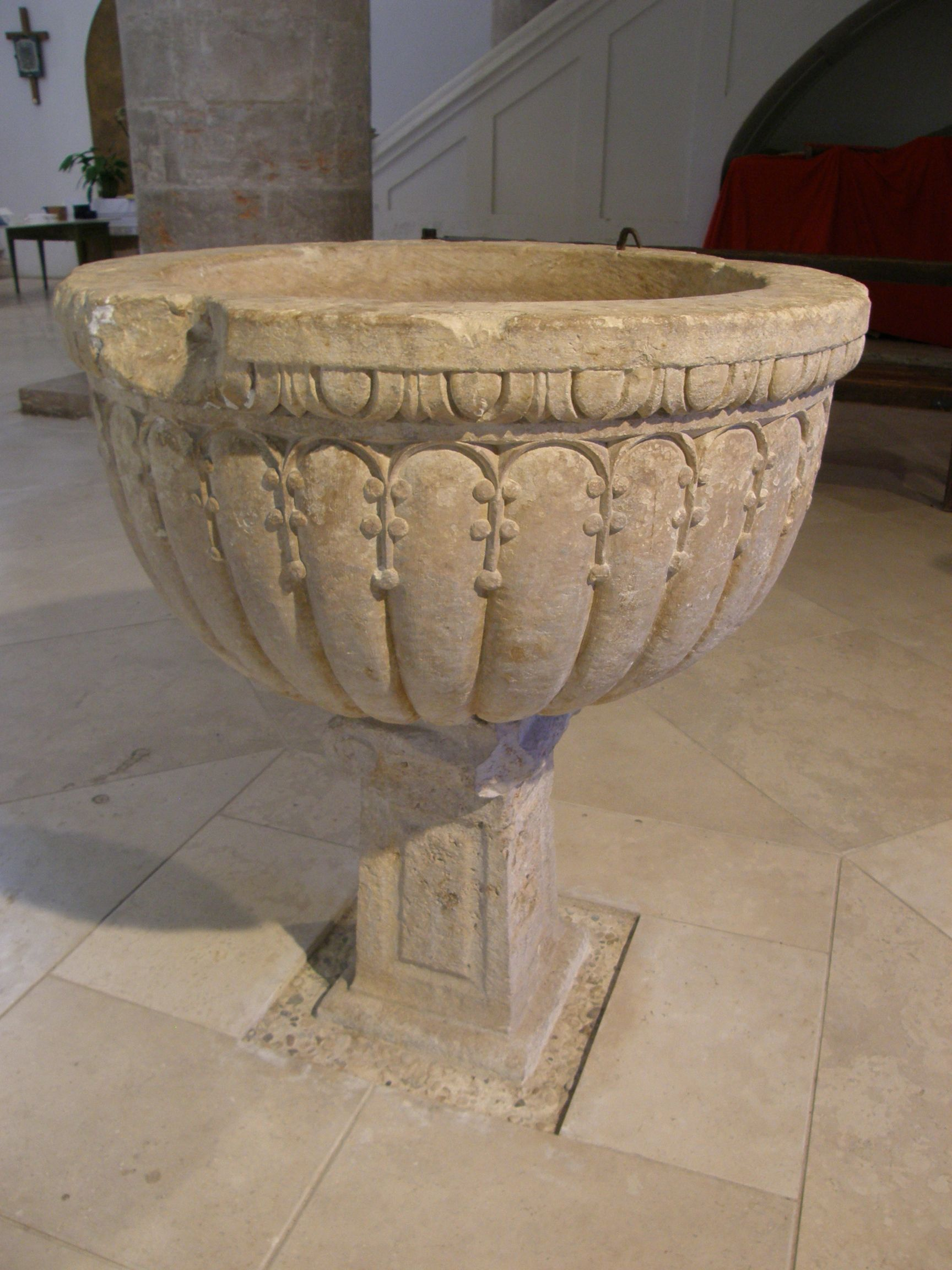
Baptismal basin

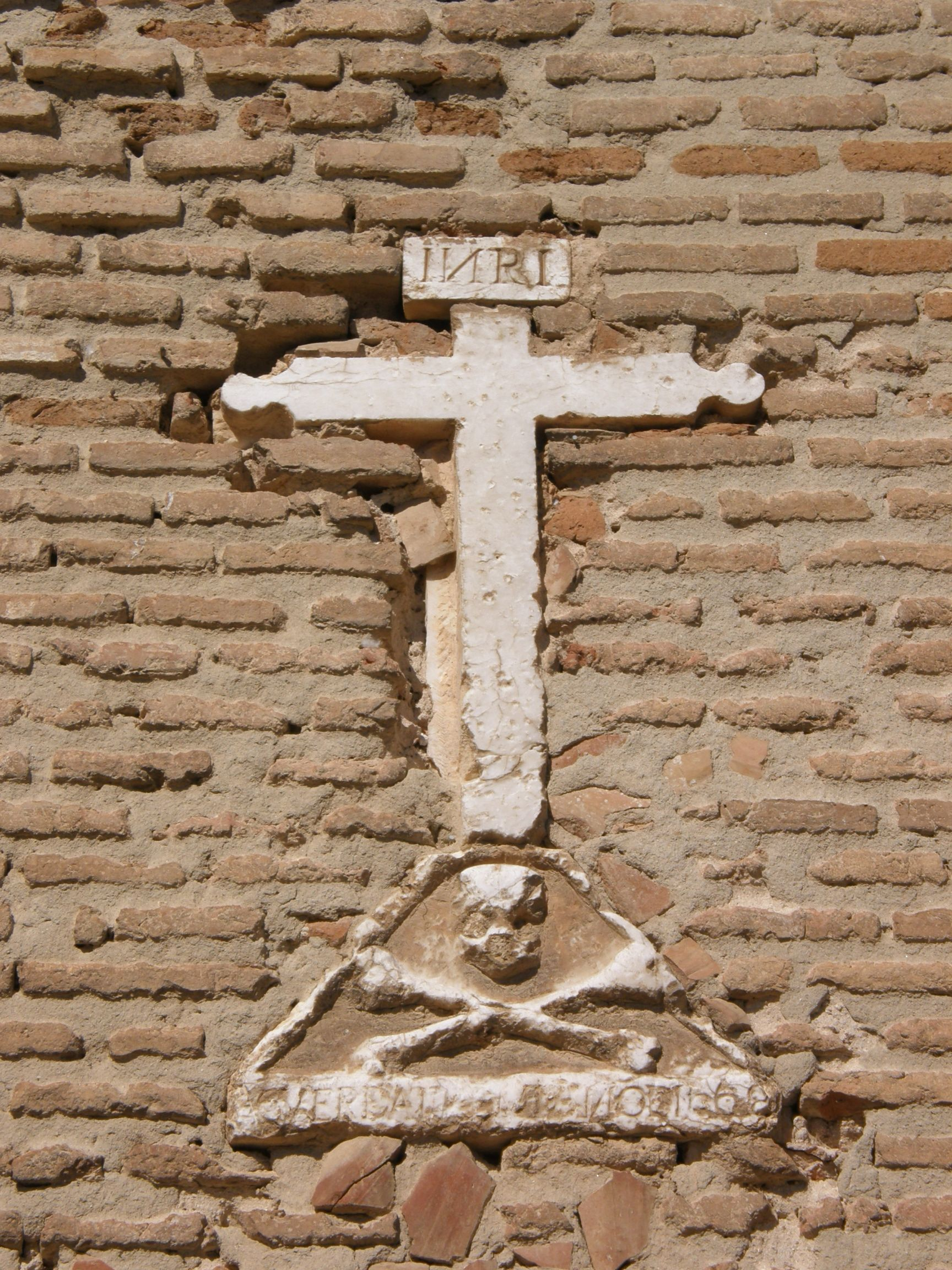
Cross on facade

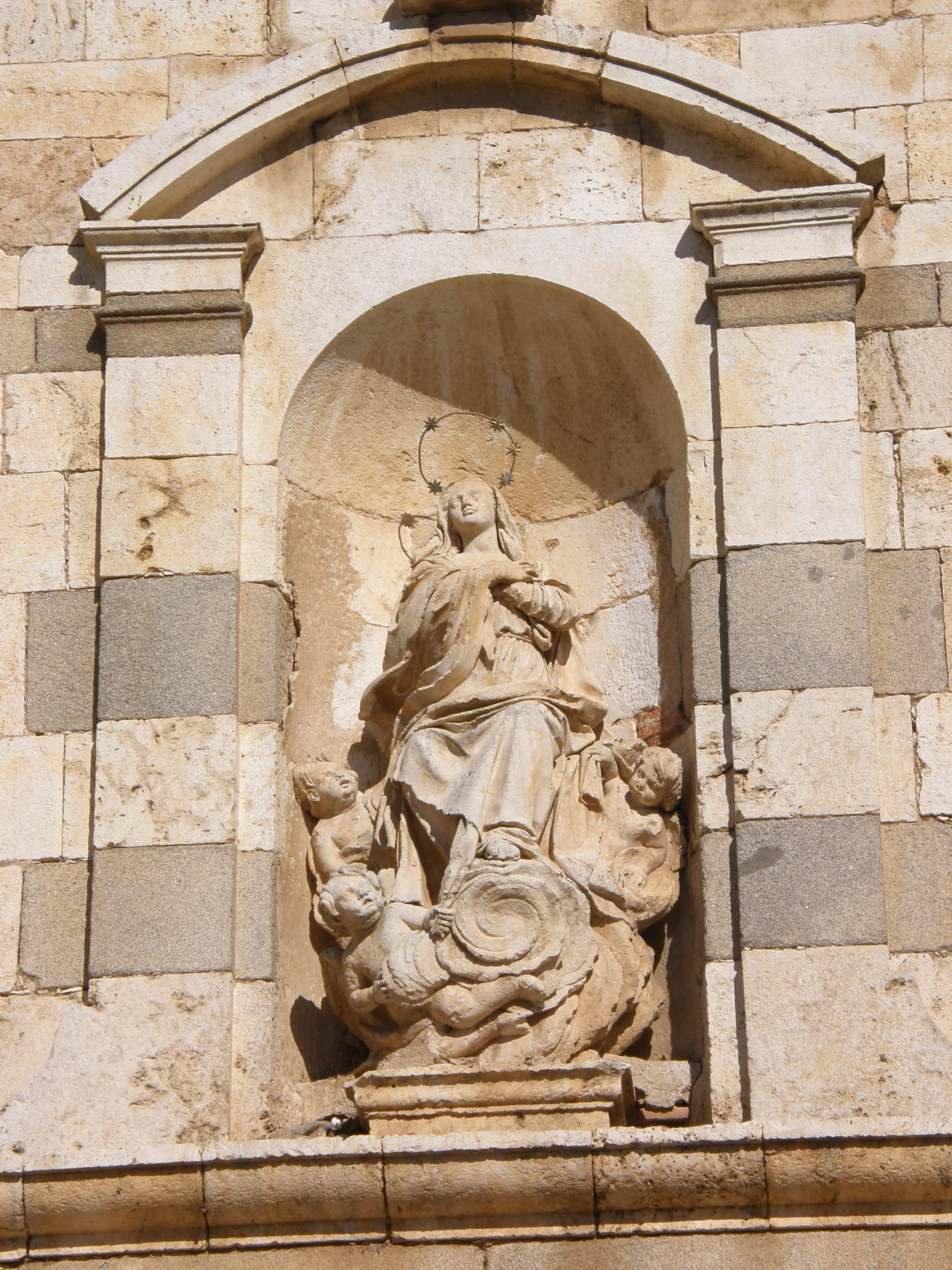
Virgin of the Assumption over the south door

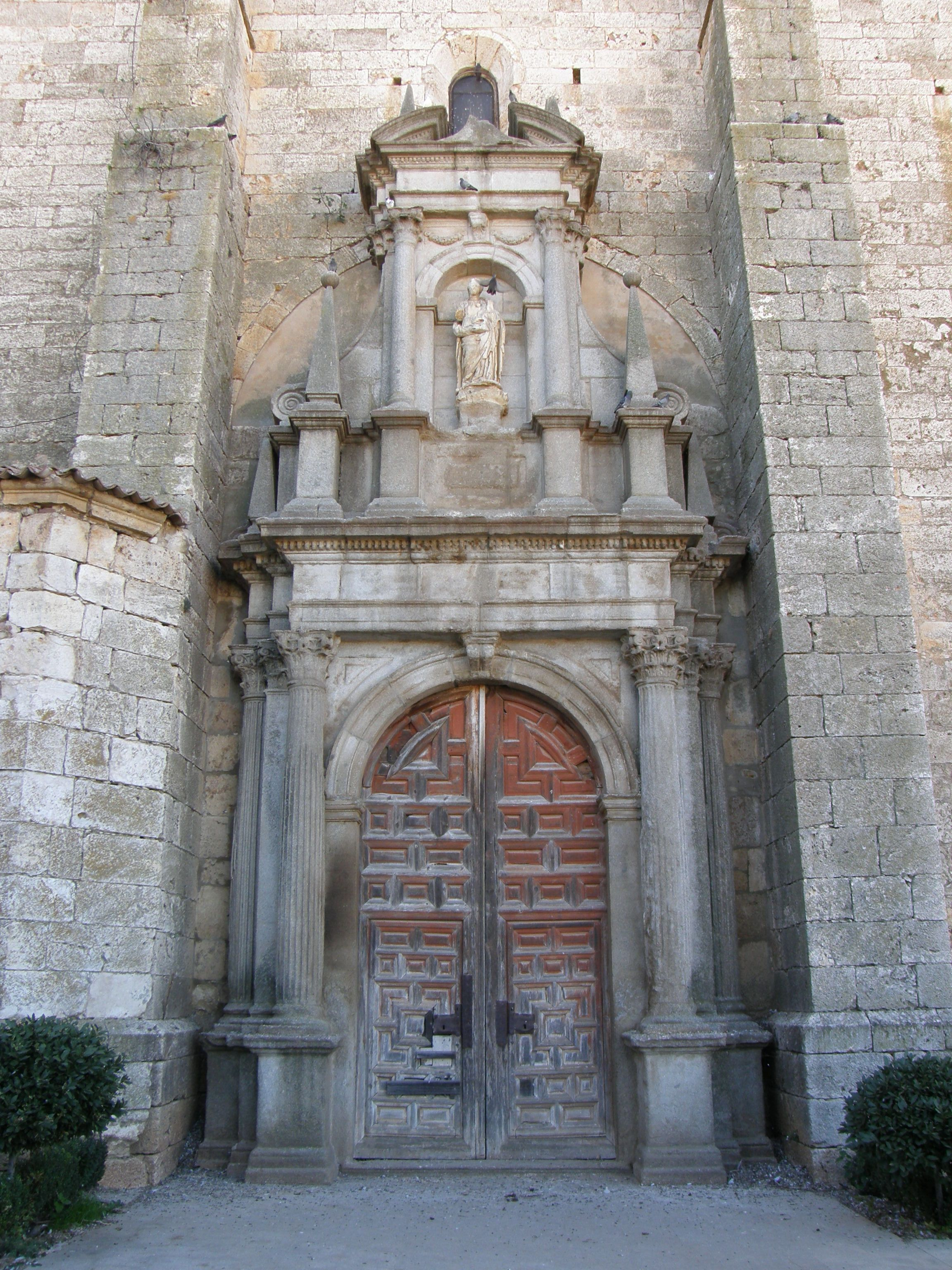
North entrance
