= Housers =

Spanish real estate crowdfunding company

Housers.com is a real estate crowdfunding company. It was founded on April 27, 2015, in Spain, by Alvaro Luna of Madrid and Tono Brusola of Valencia. Through its online platform, investors choose where, when, and how much to invest into Spanish real estate opportunities recommended by experts.

== History ==
In 2008, the Spanish real estate bubble popped, and prices dropped by some 40%. Prices eventually began to level out again in 2014.

Around that time, Luna and Brusola began looking for investment opportunities. However, at this time, foreign investors dominated Spanish commercial real estate opportunities. Of the €10.2 billion invested in Spanish commercial real estate in 2014, half came from foreign investors. This made it more difficult for smaller, local investors to get into the market. Luna and Brusola found that most of their investors were able to contribute only a small amount. "We said, 'To do this we really should have a crowdfunding site. How weird that there isn't one,'" recalled Brusola in a 2015 article.

Housers' first two investment opportunities – offered the week the company opened – were an apartment in Madrid and a storefront in Valencia. Crowdfunders were required to invest at least €500 to participate.

In September 2015, Housers acquired its first apartment. This was the first real estate purchase in Spain ever to be purchased entirely through crowdfunding. 49 crowdfunders bought the apartment for a total of €62,000, an average of about €1,265 ($1,427) each. They spent an additional €80,500 (about USD €1,642 each) for taxes and renovations. The crowdfunders planned to rent the apartment for €450 per month, splitting profits based on investments. Housers anticipated a total gross return of 67.8%, or €33,123, over five years, on this first property.

== Growth ==
Since its inception in 2015, Housers has grown to employ 42 individuals in nine different departments. Though created and based in Madrid, Spain, Housers is now present in Milan, Italy and Lisbon, Portugal.

A 2015 article credited Housers with "helping to get the Spanish real estate market back on its feet, using crowdfunding from everyday people."

In 2017, Housers became the first real estate crowdfunding company in Spain to be authorized by the Comisión Nacional del Mercado de Valores (CNMV), a government regulating agency similar to the United States' Securities and Exchange Commission.

=== Services ===
Housers handles the legal and administrative aspects of investment and advertises that "you can make the most of your money from your home's sofa." One review summarized the business thus: "From as little as € 50, Housers crowdfunding platform can create and manage your own property portfolio – with 'interesting' results."

Investors' contributions are safeguarded by a private financial institution, and can be withdrawn at any time.

As of May 2017, Housers had about 43,000 crowdfunders. About 65% of these investors decide to diversify their investments by contributing to other Housers projects.

=== Properties ===
Since its inception, Housers has raised almost 23 million euros for collective financing of 94 properties:

- 73 in Madrid
- 9 in Barcelona
- 7 in Valencia
- 2 in Palma de Mallorca
- 1 in Marbella
- 1 in Sevilla
- 1 in Meco, Spain

Housers "expects to exceed 160,000 users and reach 90 million euros of collective financing for the acquisition of 300 properties in Spain, for subsequent rental and sale," according to one article.

== Opportunities ==
Housers offers three types of crowdfunding opportunities:

=== Buy-to-Sell opportunities ===
When crowdfunders raise the sale price for the property, they buy it. They must keep their investment until the sale price is raised and the property is sold. When they sell the property, each of the crowdfunders gets their investment back.

=== Saving opportunities ===
Crowdfunders each buy a portion of the property and get a monthly income check. The property is not sold right away. It also does not have a fixed sale price. Instead, it is treated as a longer source of savings income. The crowdfunders decide when they want to sell the property.

=== Sales opportunities ===
Crowdfunders purchase social shares of the real estate company investing in the property. They must keep their investment until the sale price is raised and the property is sold. Once the property is sold, the crowdfunders get a share back.

=== Accessibility ===
Proponents of crowdfunding say that it "evens the playing field and offers regular people a ticket to a profitable investment class from which they were once barred." Rodrigo Niño, a Colombian developer who developed one of the first real estate crowdfunding projects, described the benefits thusly:

Before, if you had more money, your dollar had higher returns. With crowdfunding, everyone's dollar has an equal return. It's just about access.

=== Economic market ===
Many of Housers' properties are in Barcelona and Madrid, which have been described as "key investment hubs." Barcelona, in particular, was a hotspot of real estate investment during 2016.

A 2015 guide explains Spain's unique advantages to investors:

Spain is one of the most significant economies in the world: 13th in terms of size and an attractive destination for foreign investment, making Spain the 11th largest recipient of FDI worldwide. Spain’s appeal for investment lies not only in its domestic market, but also in the possibility of operating with third markets from Spain. This is because Spain has a privileged geo-strategic position within the European Union giving access to almost 1,900 million potential clients in the EMEA Region (Europe, Middle East and Africa). Its strong economic, historic and cultural ties also make Spain the perfect business gateway to Latin America. Furthermore, Spain is a modern knowledge-based economy with services accounting for 74.35% of economic activity. The country has become a center of innovation supported by a young, highly-qualified workforce and competitive costs in the context of Western Europe.

Additionally, as of 2015, the Spanish market featured both "rock-bottom prices" and strong economic growth potential, making it a promising environment for real estate crowdfunding.

=== Returns ===
Brusola claims that some of Housers' properties return a 60% – 70% investment over four years: "These are small but very profitable deals."

== Requirements ==
Crowdfunders must have both:

- A monthly income to invest; and
- A real asset to use as collateral.

There is no cost to join Housers and no membership fee, though investors do pay a 12.5% fee on the profits they earn. Membership is open to any individual of legal age, either from Spain or a foreign country; and to legal entities registered in Spain.

Participants must invest at least € 50 per investment opportunity. Most participants can invest as much as they choose in a given opportunity. The organization's "accredited investors" – their wealthiest, most aggressive investors – may spend no more than €3,000 per project, or €10,000 in 12 months.

== Criticisms ==
Real estate crowdfunding has its critics. For example, real estate developer Lane Auten opines:

Whenever retail investors are 'attracted' into the institutional world via things like crowdfunding, they usually get the worst deals and the highest fees ... Spain is full of crappy investments. Knowing Spaniards and their real estate market, they're foaming at the mouth thinking 'crowdfunding' to get rid of stuff.

When Housers performed an equity raise via Crowdcube in 2017, multiple investors draw criticism to the company's valuation suggesting that it was too high.

In addition to this type of criticism, Housers is in the spotlight due to several legal disputes between the current management and former CEO and partner Tono Brusola. In mid-2019 Brusola left his position as CEO, while remaining a shareholder (with approximately 20% of the shares) and sole director of the subsidiaries. Since then, Housers has been trying to liquidate Brusola and will start a legal battle that has not yet come to an end.

Currently there are four legal cases in progress:

1. to regain possession of the subsidiaries of Housers and the acquisition of the shares in Brusola
2. embezzlement and unfair competition
3. compensation of €225,000 in fine that the CNMV (Spanish National Commission for Market Safety) gave to Housers in September 2019
4. dissemination of business secrets

In addition to this, a group of Spanish investors decided to partner against Housers in June 2020. Thus was born the AfectadoHousers association, with president Luis Ballesteros, a retired investor, followed by the lawyer Manuel Carlos Merino Maestre, who had already addressed the case against the Crowdlending Comunitae platform. On 31 December 2020 there were over 100 projects overdue for over €40 million blocked. The main accusations are of mismanagement and very little transparency, in addition to the absent due diligence and the conflict of interest at least for some projects.
