= The Voice of the Desert =

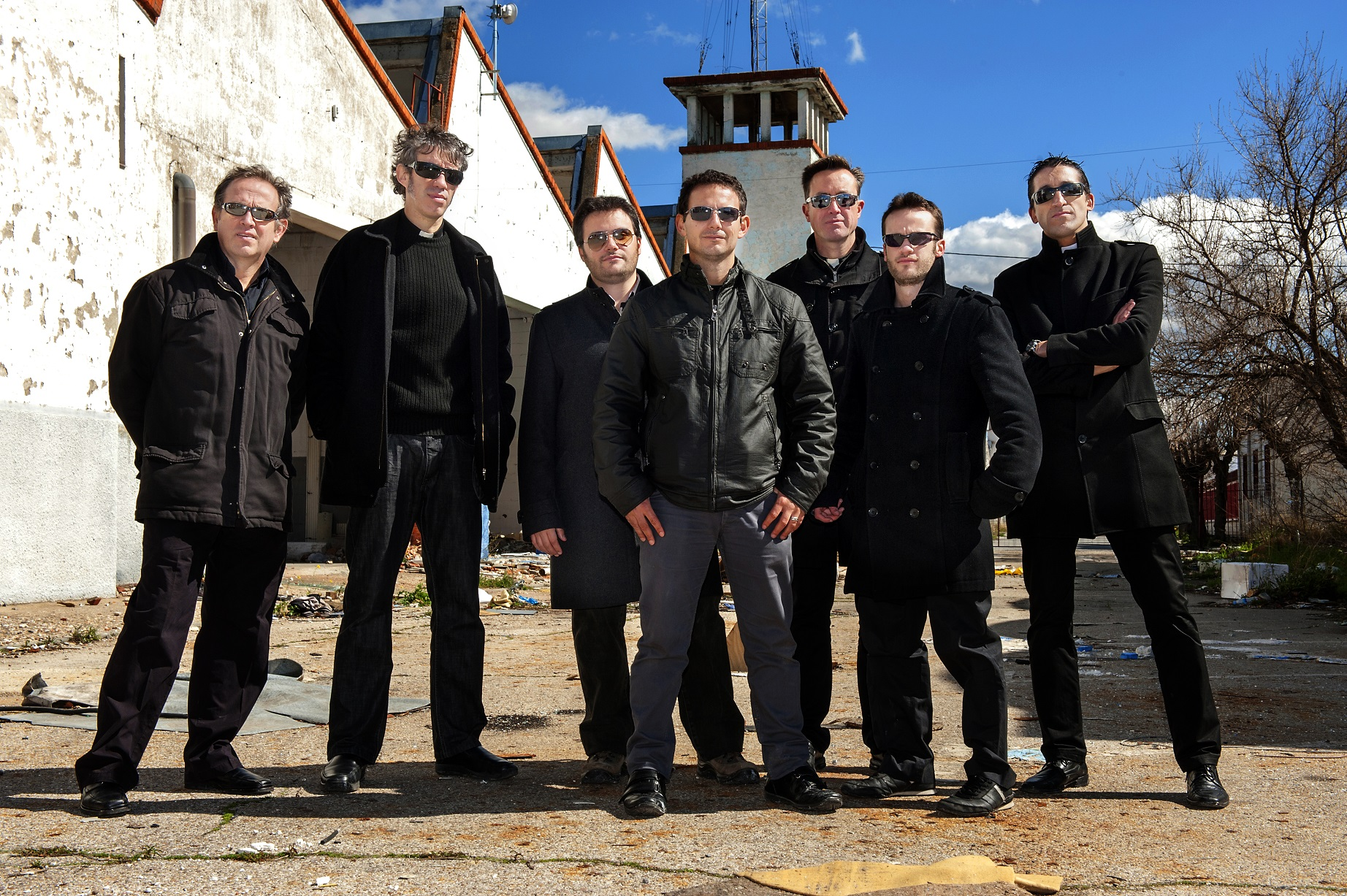

Background information
- Origin: Alcala de Henares, Madrid, Spain
- Genres: Worship music, contemporary Christian, Christian rock
- Years active: 2004–present
- Website: www.lavozdeldesierto.es

The Voice of the Desert (Spanish: La Voz del Desierto) is a Spanish rock band from the Diocese of Alcalá de Henares, Madrid. Three of the band's members are Catholic priests. They are known as rocker priests and have published six albums with contemporary Christian music.

== Biography ==
The band was established in 2003 at the diocesan seminary of Alcala de Henares, Spain, when some students of theology came together to sing and record some songs about of God. Their live performances have given them a great credibility and have provided them with million followers in Spain, Portugal and the United States.

In 2011, Pope Benedict XVI visited Madrid on the occasion of World Youth Day and The Voice of the Desert gave several concerts in the Spanish capital for young people from dozens of countries on the five continents. Since 2015 they cross the Atlantic Ocean to take their music to the United States of the hand of the Ministerio Mensaje Texas.

In March 2016 they published Mi Fortaleza, a compilation CD with the 16 essential songs of La Voz del Desierto. The album was distributed by Universal Music. In March 2017, his sixth album was released, entitled Tu rostró buscaré, produced by Santi Fernández, drummer of Los Secretos.

In March 2017, the group released their sixth album, titled Tu rostro buscaré (I Will Seek Your Face), which was also produced by Santi Fernández.

During the summer of 2017, Raposo and the band embarked on their first tour of the United States. The tour included live performances, personal testimonies, and prayer vigils across various locations in the states of New York, New Jersey, and Texas, including cities such as Dallas, Fort Worth, and Houston. This US tour generated significant media coverage among Spanish-language networks, and the band was interviewed by major broadcasters including Univision and Telemundo. In the autumn of that same year, they were selected by the organizers of World Youth Day 2019 in Panama to perform a series of concerts in the Central American nation.

In January 2019, they released the video clip for their song Magnificat and in Panama City they gave eight concerts in just nine days. In 2020, due to the COVID-19 pandemic, they gave online concerts and celebrated the Eucharist, prayed the rosary and made the exposition of the Blessed Sacrament through social networks.

In April 2021, La Voz del Desierto joined a project by Catholic singer Martín Valverde and the Canadian production company Salt + Light Television. Together with more than 60 artists from 17 countries, they recorded the Catholic song Nadie te ama como Yo. In June 2022, after two years stopped by the COVID-19 coronavirus pandemic, they returned to the stage.

In August 2022, they participated in the European Youth Pilgrimage (PEJ22) organized by the Spanish Episcopal Conference and held in Santiago de Compostela. In October 2022 they gave a concert in the outdoor patio of the National Hospital for Paraplegics, in Toledo, organized by the chaplaincy and the complementary rehabilitation service of the health center.

In May 2023 they participated in the event This is the Day at the Fernando Martín Sports Center, in Fuenlabrada, a concert in which they shared the stage with Christian singers such as Israel Houghton, Noel Richards, Hillsong London Worship or Gilberto Daza.

In August 2023 they gave five concerts in Lisbon, Portugal, on the occasion of World Youth Day. One of them on center stage before the vigil with Pope Francis.

On 8 January 2024, Alberto Raposo Gómez was appointed Vicar General and Moderator of the curia of the Diocese of Alcalá de Henares by Bishop Antonio Prieto Lucena. After 20 years as guitarist and founding member of La Voz del Desierto, Raposo announced in an interview published in February 2024 that he would no longer be able to continue performing with the band because of his new pastoral responsibilities. The group continued its activities with one fewer guitarist.

On 16 November 2024, La Voz del Desierto performed a charity concert at Colegio San Gabriel in Alcalá de Henares to raise funds for people affected by the 2024 DANA floods in the Valencian Community and other affected regions. The proceeds were donated through Caritas Spain to support those affected by the floods.

On 8 June 2026, the band performed at Santiago Bernabéu Stadium alongside David Bustamante, Daniel Diges, Íñigo Quintero and other artists during the visit of Pope Leo XIV.

== Members ==
- Daniel Gomez de la Vega (Dani): voice.
- Jesus Javier Mora (Curry): voice.
- Julio Alejandre: bass guitar.
- Jose Cortes: percussion.
- Alejandro de Dios (Alex): guitar.
- Pedro Martinez: piano.
- Ignacio Ortiz (Nacho): guitar.
- Jesús García-Ochoa: drums.
- Alberto Raposo (Rapo): electric guitars and backing vocals (founding member; currently does not perform in concerts due to his responsibilities as Vicar General of the Diocese of Alcalá de Henares).

== Discography ==
- Thy Will Be Done On Me – 2005
- To A Light – 2007
- The Calling – 2010
- The Lord Gets Me Up Again – 2013
- My Strength – 2016
- I will seek Your face – 2017
