= Diocese of Alcalá de Henares =

Latin Catholic jurisdiction in Spain

Coordinates: 40.4806°N 3.3692°W

Diocese of Alcalá de Henares Dioecesis Complutensis Diócesis de Alcalá de Henares

Catholic
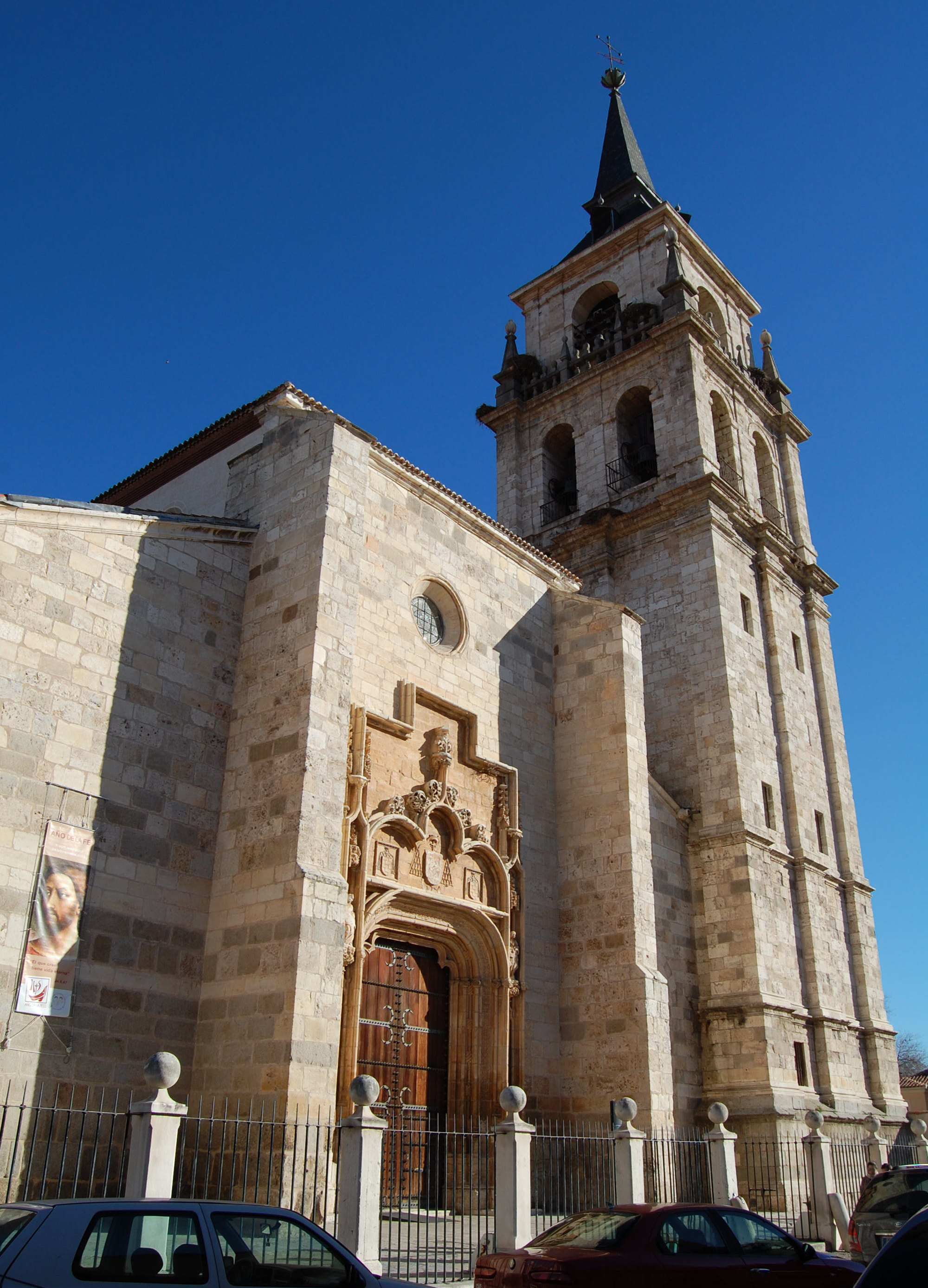
- Alcalá de Henares Cathedral

- Coat of arms

Location
- Country: Spain
- Ecclesiastical province: Madrid

Statistics
- Area: 2,586 km^{2} (998 sq mi)
- Population: Total; Catholics: (as of 2012); 807,248; 686,161 (85%)

Information
- Denomination: Catholic Church
- Sui iuris church: Latin Church
- Rite: Roman Rite
- Established: 23 July 1991
- Cathedral: Cathedral of St Justus and St Pastor in Alcalá de Henares

Current leadership
- Pope: Leo XIV
- Bishop: Antonio Prieto Lucena
- Metropolitan Archbishop: Carlos Osoro Sierra
- Bishops emeritus: Juan Antonio Reig Pla

Map
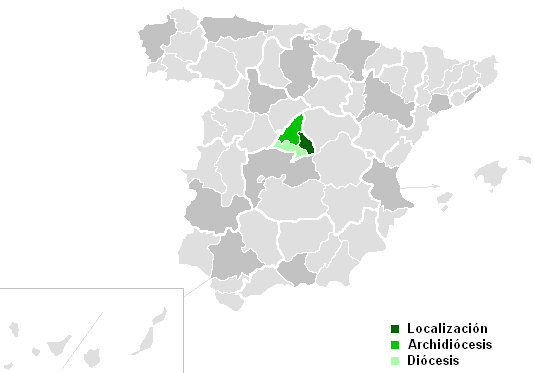

Website
- Website of the Diocese

The Diocese of Alcalá de Henares (Latin: Compluten(sis)) is a Latin Church ecclesiastical territory or diocese of the Catholic Church in Spain. Its episcopal see is Alcalá de Henares. The diocese is a suffragan in the ecclesiastical province of the metropolitan Archdiocese of Madrid.

== History ==
An ancient diocese of Complutum (the current Alcala de Henares) was founded in the 4th or 5th century but it was abolished under the Muslim government (8th–11th century) and not restored by the Christian Kings and its territory given to the Archdiocese of Toledo. In 1885, a Diocese of Madrid and Alcala (suffragan of Toledo) was founded, now the Archdiocese of Madrid.

On July 23, 1991, it was established as Diocese of Alcalá de Henares from the Archdiocese of Madrid (as its suffragan diocese), with the latin name of Complutensis to remember the ancient diocese.

== Bishops ==
- Manuel Ureña Pastor (23 July 1991 – 1 July 1998)
- Jesús Esteban Catalá Ibáñez (27 April 1999 – 10 October 2008)
- Juan Antonio Reig Pla (7 March 2009 – 21 September 2022)
- Antonio Prieto Lucena (1 April 2023 – present)
Coats of arms

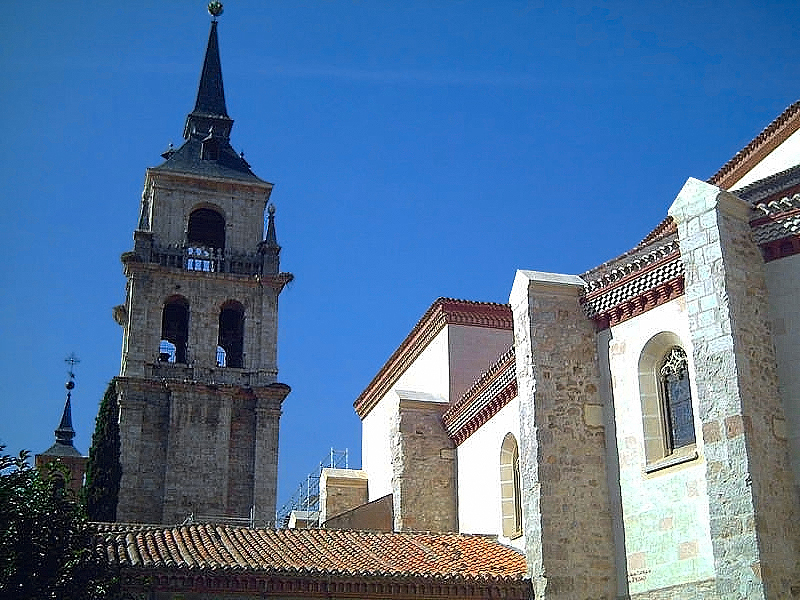
Tower

== Curiosities ==
The diocese has a pop-rock group of Catholic music called The Voice of the Desert that is made up of three diocesan priests and four laymen. This musical group born in 2004 has given concerts throughout Spain, in the United States and in Panama, participating twice with their music in the World Youth Day.

== See also ==
- Catholic Church in Spain

== Sources ==
- GCatholic.org
- Catholic Hierarchy
- Diocese website
