= Alcalá de Henares Cathedral =

Roman Catholic Cathedral in Alcalá de Henares, Spain

- Magistral Cathedral of Saint Justus and Saint Pastor
- Catedral Magistral de los Santos Niños Justo y Pastor
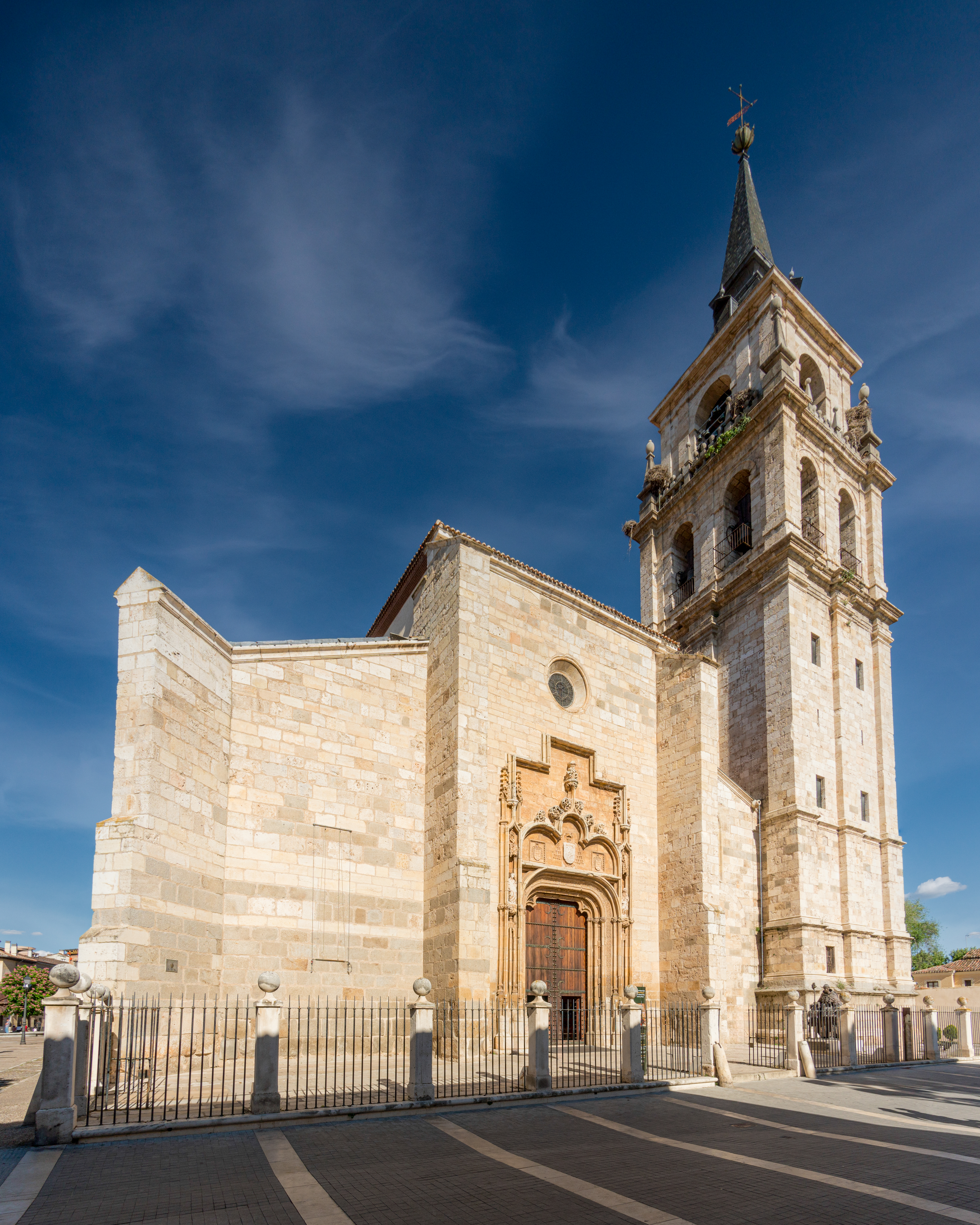
- West façade in 2023.
- Alcalá de Henares Cathedral
- 40.480525°N 3.369258°W
- Location: Alcalá de Henares
- Address: 328, Plaza de los Santos Niños
- Country: Spain
- Denomination: Catholic
- Website: visitacatedraldealcala.com

History
- Status: Cathedral
- Dedication: Justus and Pastor
- Dedicated: 23 July 1991

Architecture
- Architect(s): Antón Egas, Enrique Egas
- Style: Late Gothic, Mudéjar
- Years built: 1497—1516

Administration
- Metropolis: Madrid
- Diocese: Alcalá de Henares

Clergy
- Bishop: Antonio Prieto Lucena

UNESCO World Heritage Site
- Criteria: Cultural: (ii), (iv), (vi)
- Designated: 1998 (22nd session)
- Part of: University and Historic Precinct of Alcalá de Henares
- Reference no.: 876

Spanish Cultural Heritage
- Type: Non-movable
- Criteria: Monument
- Designated: 22 December 1904
- Reference no.: RI-51-0000085

The Magistral Cathedral of Saint Justus and Saint Pastor (Spanish: Catedral de los Santos Niños Justo y Pastor, known formally as the Santa e Insigne Catedral-Magistral de los Santos Justo y Pastor) is a Roman Catholic cathedral located in Alcalá de Henares, Spain. Together with Saint Peter's of Leuven, they are the only churches worldwide to hold the title of Magistral, as their canons are required to be doctors in Theology.

The archbishop Carrillo (1446-1482) elevated the church to the rank of collegiate church. The current building was designed during the time of Cardinal Cisneros (1495-1517) he was awarded the title of "Master" and the current building was designed and constructed between 1497 and 1516 in late Gothic style typical of the age. The tower was built between 1528 and 1582.

It was declared Bien de Interés Cultural in 1904. During the Spanish Civil War (1936-1939), the church was burned. It lost virtually all its treasures in the fire, saving some bars and some chairs from the old choir. In 1991 the diocese of Alcalá restored and elevated to the status of cathedral-master, the Diocese Complutense recovering that which was from the 5th century until 1099.

The Cathedral of Alcalá is notable as one of only two churches in the world to be granted the special title "magistral" (along with St. Peter's Church in Leuven, Belgium). The title reflects its former status as a collegiate church, and derives from the requirement that all of the canons of the cathedral must possess the academic distinction of Doctor of Theology in order to serve there. In addition to that of Saints Justus and Pastor, the cathedral also houses the tomb of renowned 17th-century Spanish sculptor Gregorio Fernández.

== History ==
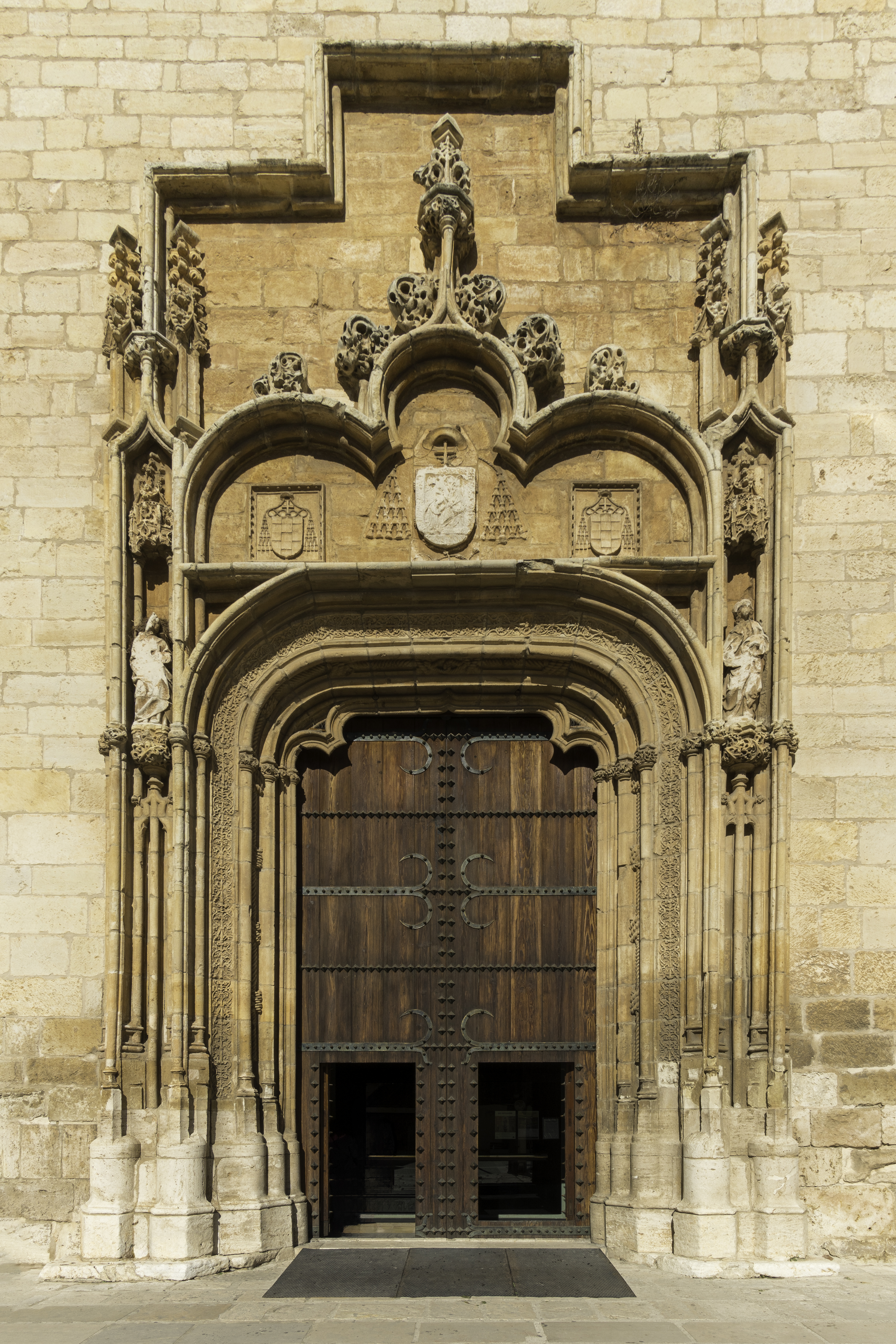
The western façade of the Cathedral of the Santos Niños, in a "florid" or "Isabelline Gothic" style

In 414 a chapel was erected at the site of Justus and Pastor's martyrdom, and was converted into a cathedral during the period of Visigoth control of Hispania; bishops from Alcalá were present at the Councils of Toledo beginning in the 7th century. In 1053 the old city of Alcalá (Alcalá la Vieja) was conquered by Ferdinand the Great, only to be recaptured the following year by the Moorish armies then warring for control of the Iberian Peninsula, who destroyed the cathedral as an act of retaliation. At that time the relics of Saints Justus and Pastor were taken to Huesca for safekeeping until after the reconquest of Alcalá in 1118. Although a church was rebuilt on the site in 1122, Pope Urban II, under the influence of his friend Raymond de Sauvetât, the Archbishop of Toledo, decided not to restore the Diocese of Alcalá at that time. Instead, de Sauvetât was able to secure the incorporation of Alcalá into his own archiepiscopal territories through a donation from King Alfonso VII in 1129.

The church was rebuilt again some three hundred years later by a subsequent archbishop of Toledo, Alfonso Carrillo de Acuña, who elevated it to the status of a collegiate church. It was finally reconstructed in its present Isabelline Gothic style under Cardinal Cisneros (1495–1517), the founder of the university. A tower was added between 1528 and 1582, achieving its modern appearance in 1618. The processional cloister and the Chapel of Saint Peter were incorporated into the building in the 17th century.

The building was declared a national monument in 1904. Nevertheless, it was burned during the Spanish Civil War (1936–1939), and practically all of its contents were destroyed with the exception of a few minor relics and choir seats.

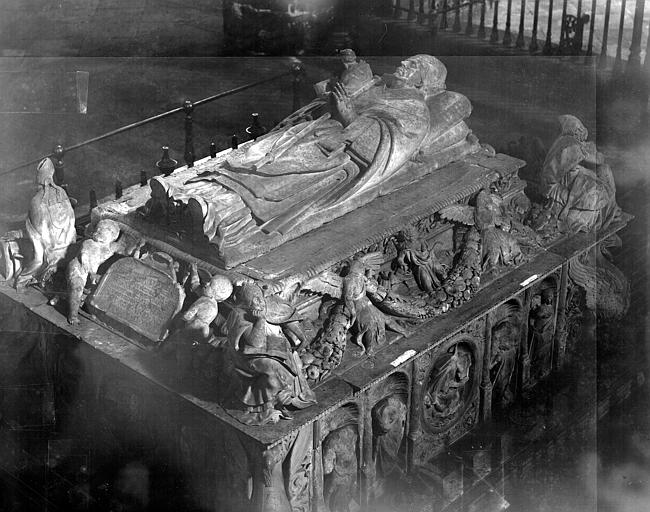
Cardinal Cisneros' tomb, in the cathedral

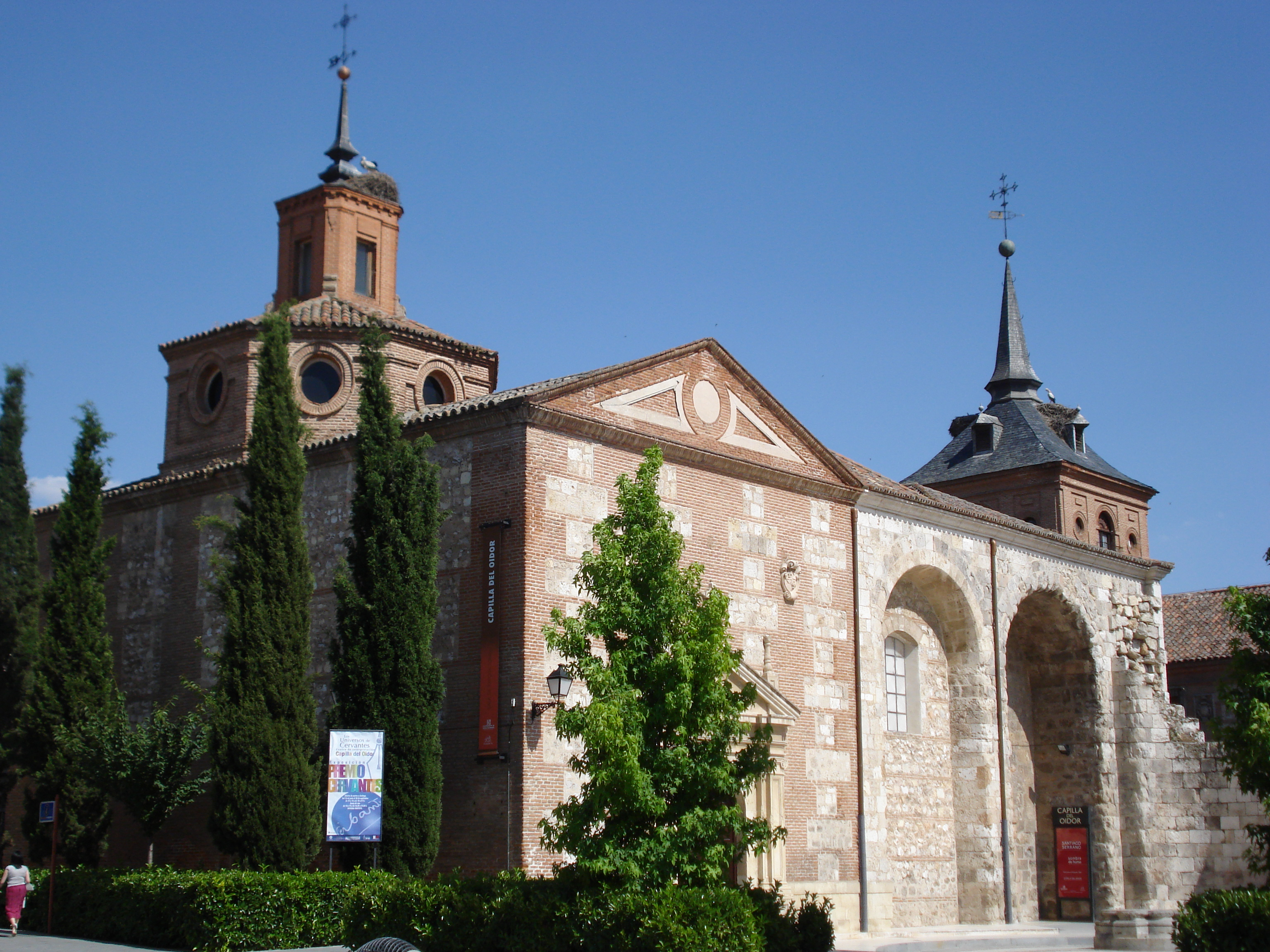
Oidor Church

It was not until 1991 that the Diocese of Alcalá was finally restored, being separated from the Archdiocese of Madrid (established in 1885 as "Diocese of Madrid and Alcalá"), at which time the building was granted its present status of cathedral-magistral (although the title "magistral" was originally granted by Cardinal Cisneros, the building was still technically only a collegiate church, and not yet a cathedral within the ecclesiastical meaning of the term).

== Exterior ==
The exterior of the cathedral is simple and austere. The walls are covered by molding type Segovia. They emphasize the cover of the western facade of Flamboyant Gothic style, in which central medallion depicted on Saint Ildefonso; and the tower, designed by Rodrigo Gil de Hontañón and Rodrigo Argüello, in herrerian style, with a height of 62.05 meters. Top is a beautiful spire tower slate.

The cathedral has a severe seventeenth century cloister arches between pilasters. Soils appear covered by Renaissance carpets from nearby convents. In one of the walls the grave of Cardinal Cisneros remains.

== Interior ==
The building's interior is divided into three naves covered by cross vaults resting on pillars fasciculados. The overall shape of the building resembles the traditional Latin cross with marked transept. The entire building suffered much in that fire, and countless works of art and objects of great historical, devotional and sentimental value were lost. Today the cathedral houses apart from its religious functions, an interpretive center and the Cathedral Museum.

== Gallery ==
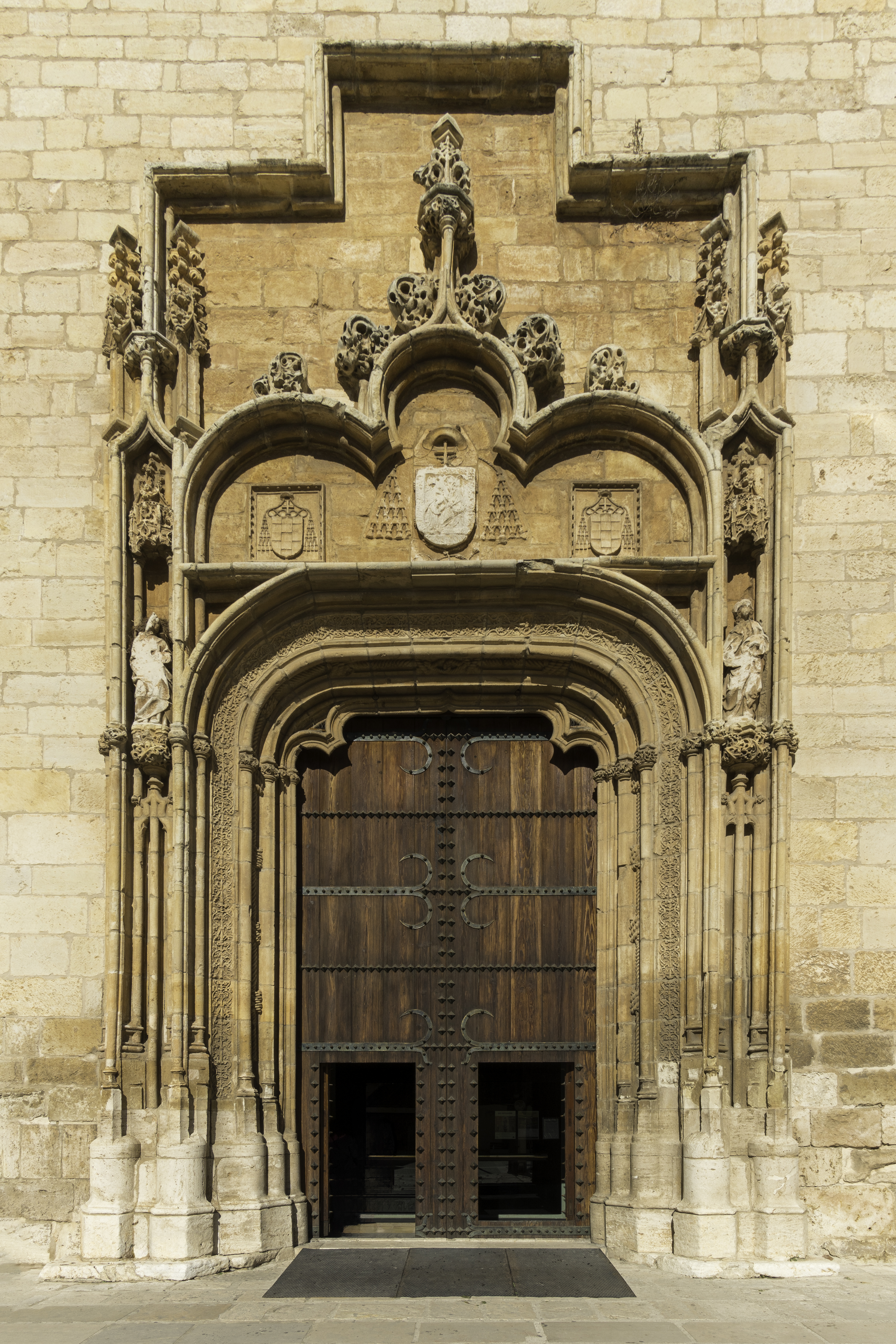
Main portico.

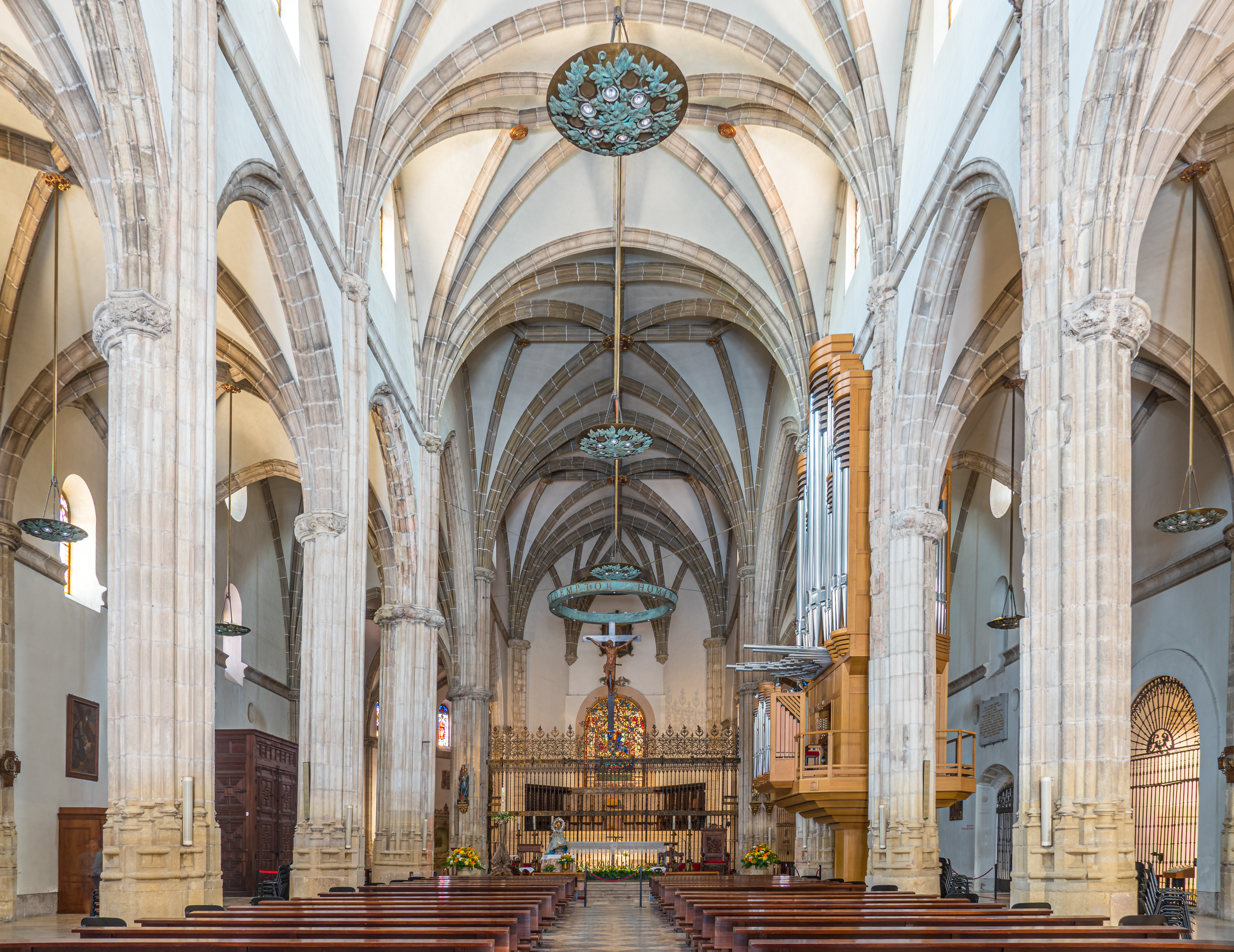
Central Nave

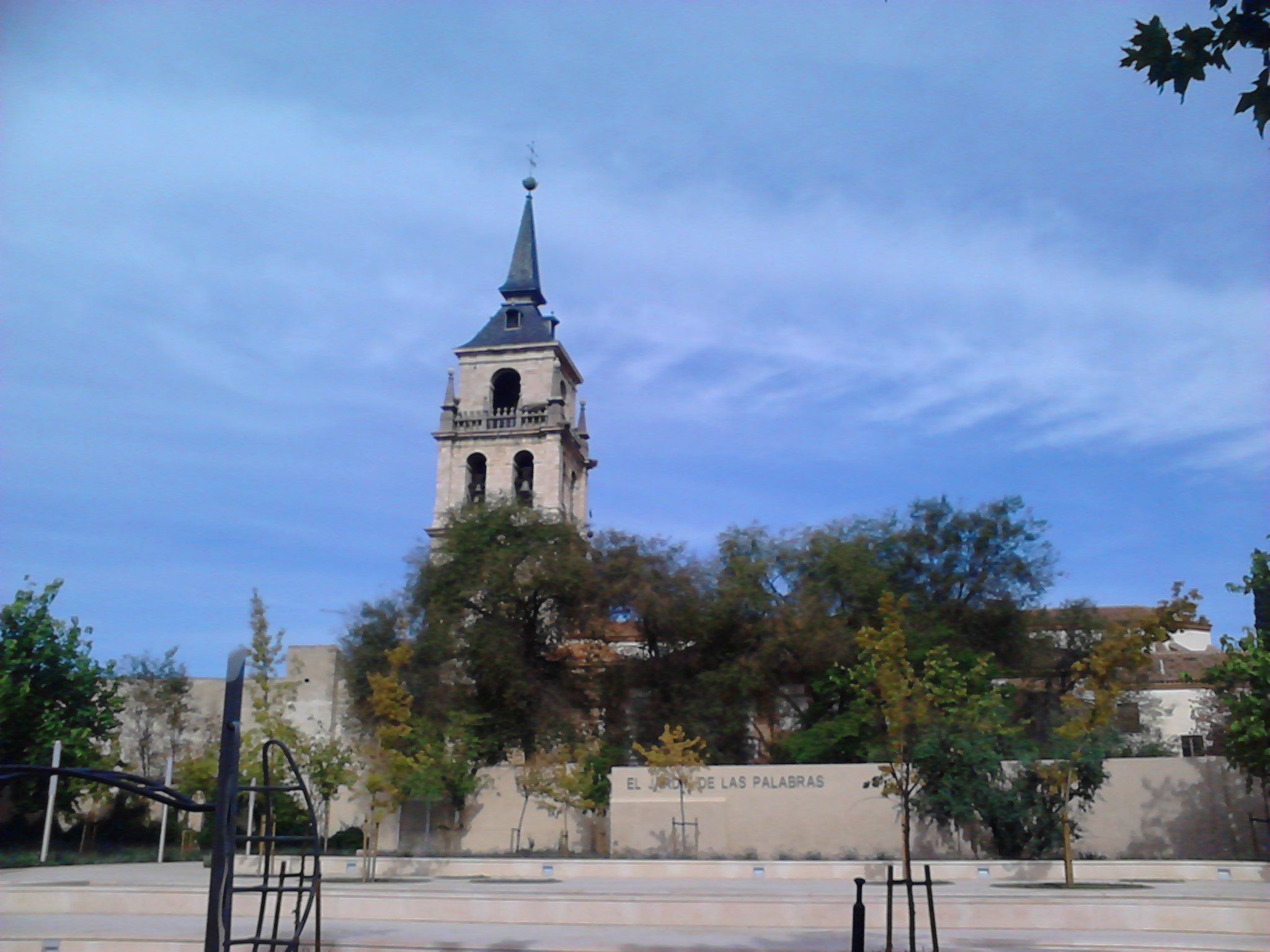
Church tower

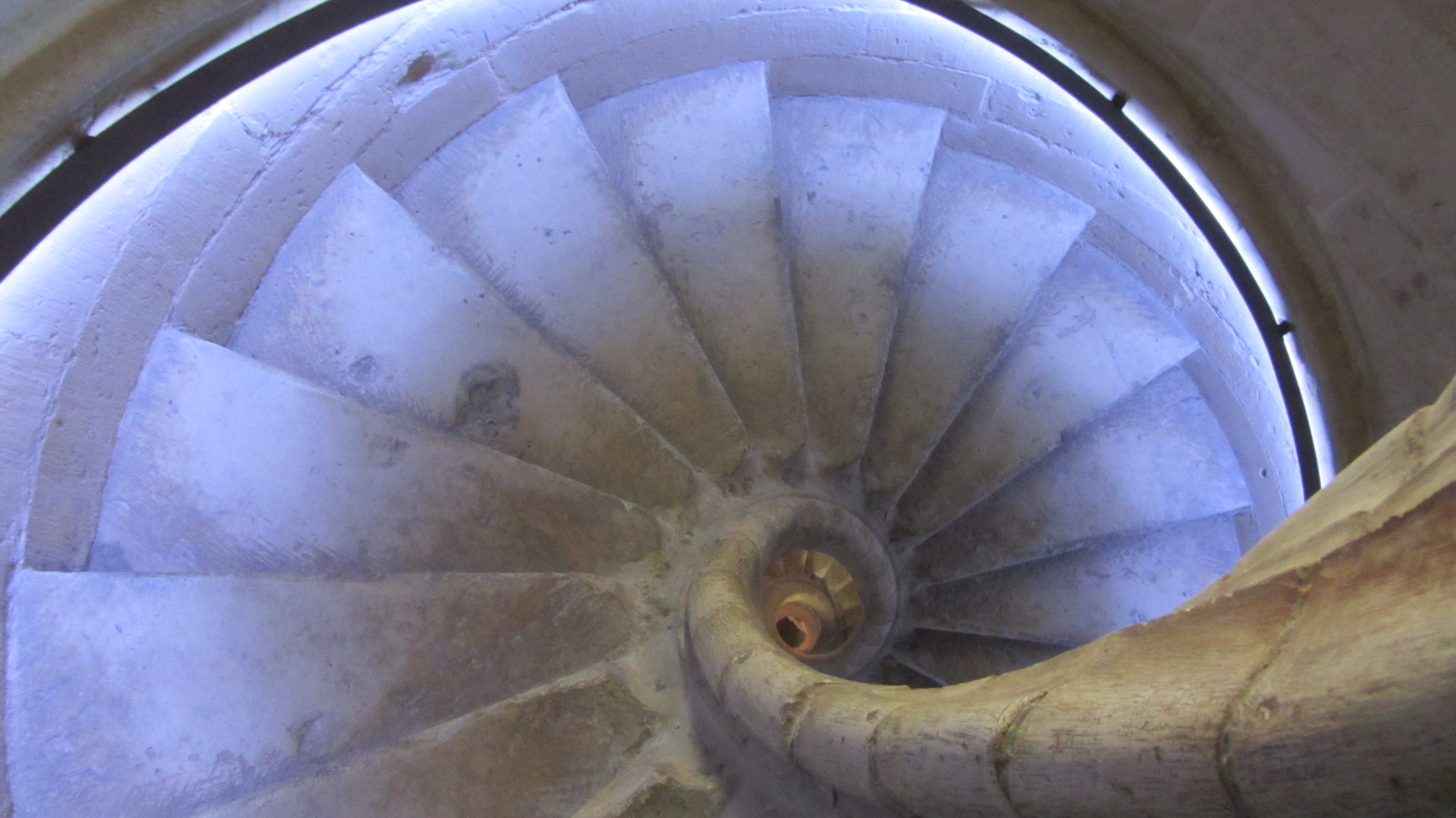
Spiral staircase to access the bell tower

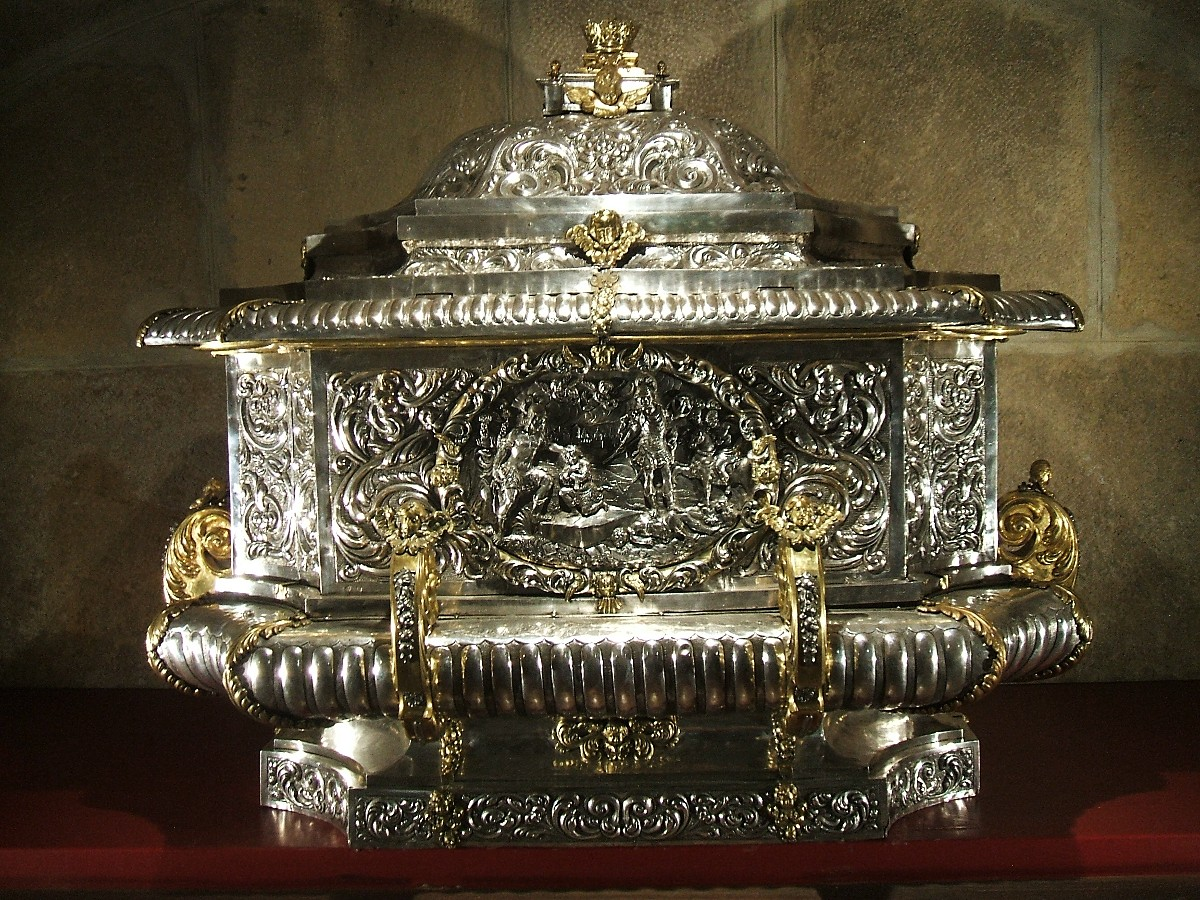
Silver urn

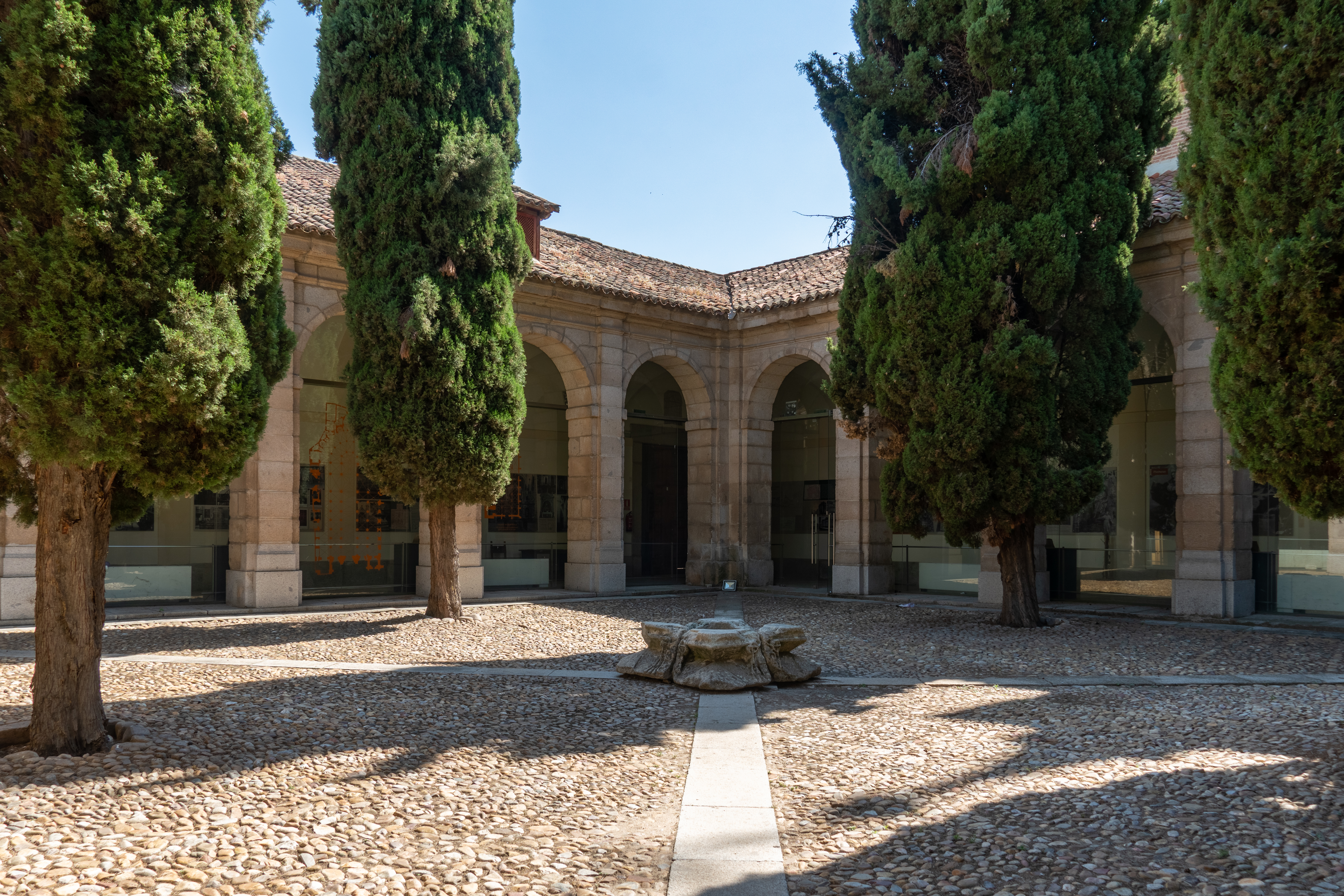
Cloister
