= Basilica of Saints Justus and Pastor =

- Església dels Sants Just i Pastor
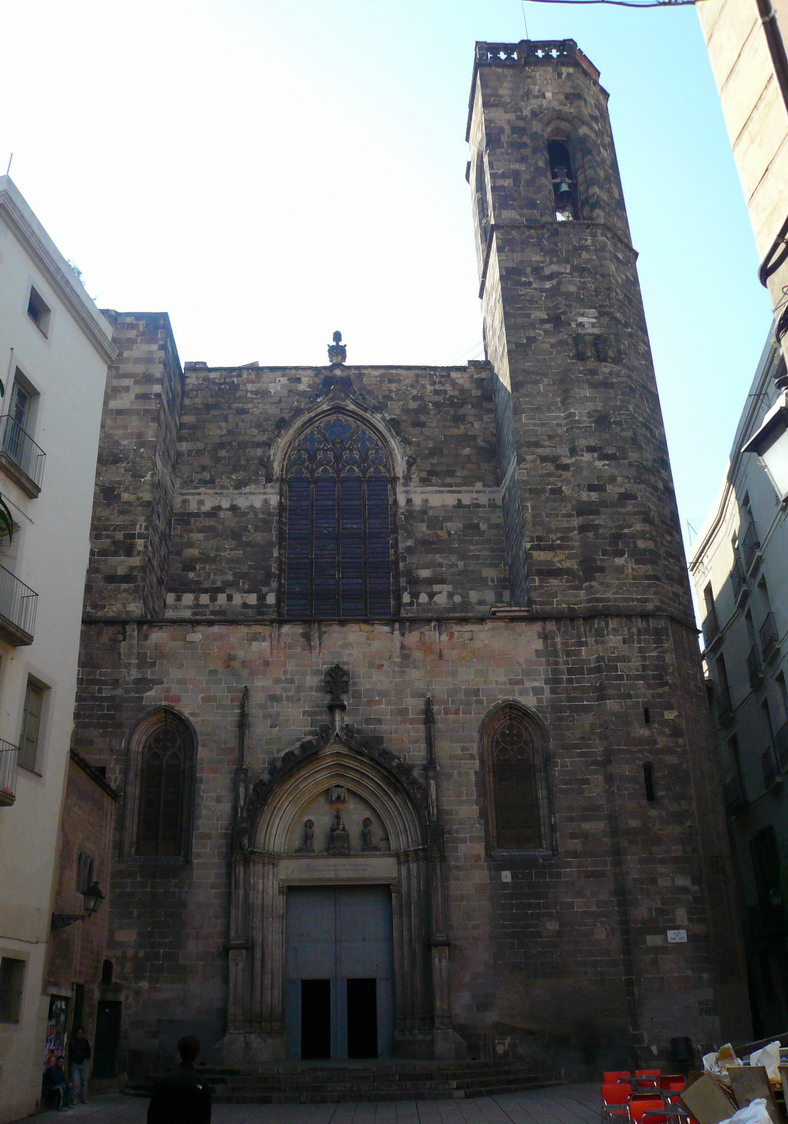

- Location within Barcelona
- 41°22′58″N 2°10′41″E
- Location: Barcelona
- Country: Spain
- Denomination: Catholic

History
- Status: Basilica
- Dedication: Sainta Justus and Pastor

Administration
- Archdiocese: Barcelona

The Basilica of Saints Justus and Pastor (Catalan: Església dels Sants Just i Pastor) is a basilica in Barcelona, Catalonia. In 1948 this church became the sixth in Barcelona to receive the rank of minor basilica, a title that was granted by Pope Pius XII.

== History ==
The construction of the Gothic church began on February 1 of 1342 and lasted until 1574. It was built on the old Romanesque church and the site of the former chapel of Sant Celoni. In 1363 the first three sections of the nave were finished, the vault of the feet would be finished in the following century.

The construction of the façade and the belfry lasted until the 16th century, and the master builders Pere Blai, Joan Safont and Joan Granja participated.

During the 19th century the choir passed from the center of the nave to the apse, and for this the altar was moved forward. The façade was also reconstructed in Gothic Revival style between the years 1880 and 1887, the work of Josep Oriol Mestres. Other reforms were to the chapel of the Santíssim in 1904 by August Font i Carreras, when in 1944 the polychromy of the nave and the vaults of the 19th century were eliminated. In 1946 it was restored to the orders of the architect Jeroni Martorell i Terrats.

In 1948 received the title of minor basilica, granted by the Pope Pius XII.
