= Meco, Spain =

Meco
- Municipality
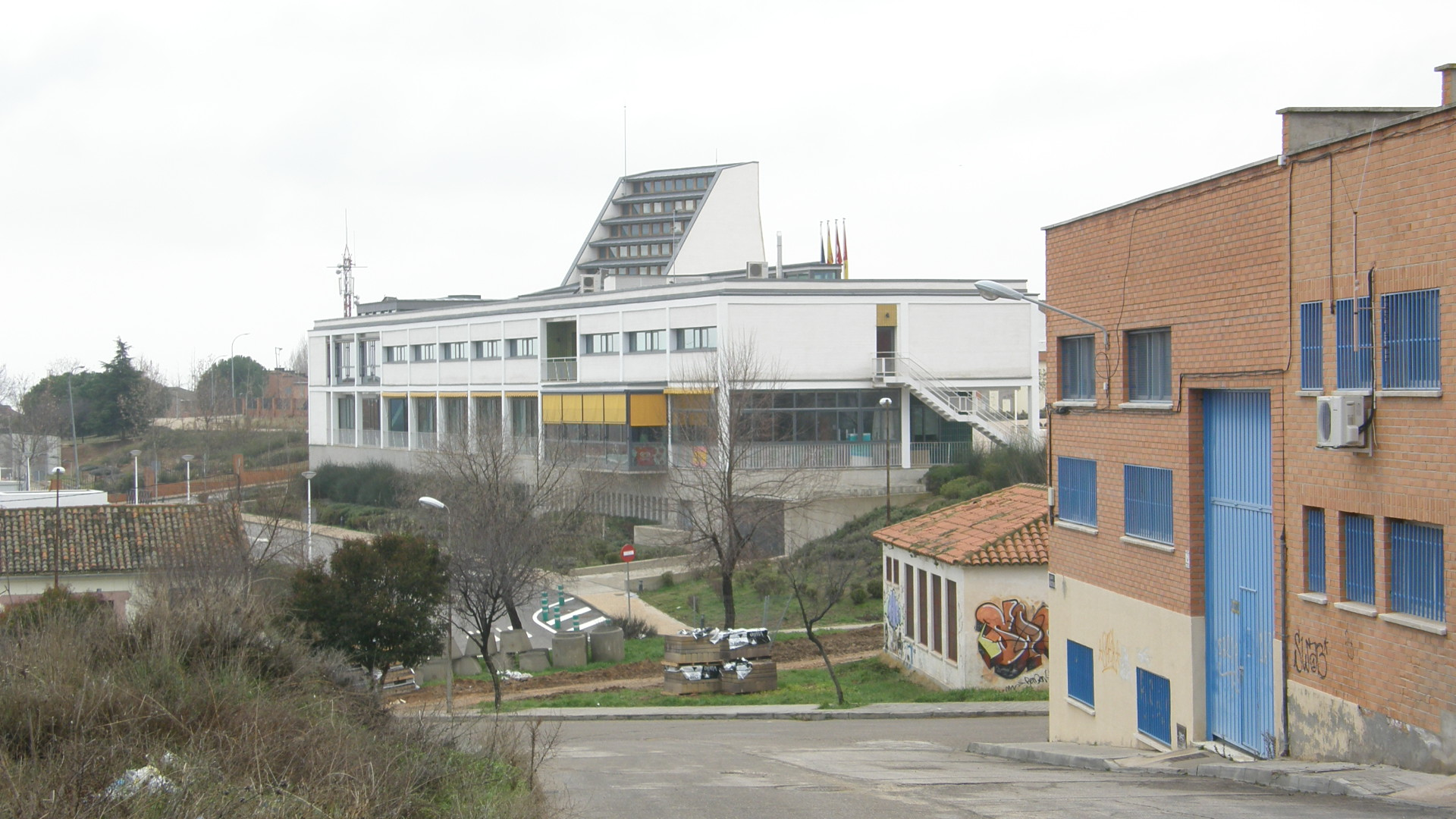
- Town hall

- Flag Coat of arms

- Location in Spain
- Coordinates: 40°33′14″N 3°19′34″W
- Country: Spain
- Autonomous community: Madrid
- Province: Madrid
- Comarca: Comarca de Alcalá

Government
  - Alcalde: Pedro Luis Sanz Carlavilla (PP)

Area
  - Total: 35.07 km^{2} (13.54 sq mi)
- Elevation: 673 m (2,208 ft)

Population (2025-01-01)
  - Total: 15,922
  - Density: 454.0/km^{2} (1,176/sq mi)
- Demonym: Mequero
- Time zone: UTC+1 (CET)
  - Summer (DST): UTC+2 (CEST)
- Postal code: 28880
- Website: Official website

Meco (Spanish: [ˈmeko]) is a municipality in the eastern part of the Autonomous Community of Madrid, (Spain). In 2006, Meco had a population of 11,094 (Spanish National Statistics Institute).

The town is located to the north of the River Henares, in the comarca of La Campiña del Henares, and also in one of the two natural sub-comarcas that make up the Comarca de Alcalá, La Campiña del Henares, characterized by vast grain fields and gentle hills. It is 8 km to the north of the metropolitan area of Alcalá de Henares and 4 km from the University of Alcalá. It provides residences for the university and also is part of the Henares Industrial Corridor.

On the east, Meco borders the municipalities of Azuqueca de Henares and Villanueva de la Torre, of Guadalajara, and also the autonomous community of Castile-La Mancha. It can be reached by the Royal Cattle Track of Galiana or Riojana, and by the last section of the Henares Canal.

== Geography ==
- Altitude: 673 m
- Latitude: 40° 33′ 00″ N
- Longitude: 003° 19′ 59″ E

Located at the edge of one of the terraces of the River Henares, 35 km from the capital, Madrid. The rivers Las Monjas, Villanueva, and its tributary, Valdegatos.

Meco also has the distinction of being Spain's most distant populated area from the sea.

== Economy ==
A town with a dry-soil agricultural tradition, Meco has long been an exporter of wheat, flour and bread to Alcalá, Guadalajara, and Madrid. Also, its economy is based on salt mining.

== History ==
There are archaeological remains from the Iron Age, as well as a Roman necropolis. The municipality may have originated as a Roman agricultural estate, and may have been a wheat staple in Muslim times. After the re-conquest of the Media Marca (Middle March) by Alfonso VI, it came to form part of the Commune of Villa and Land of Guadalajara. In the 15th century, King Juan II gave it to the Marquis of Santillana, Iñigo López de Mendoza, who passed it ti his second son, Iñigo López de Mendoza, Count of Tendilla. The son of Iñigo López de Mendoza, also of the same name, added the title of Marquis of Móndejar by buying this villa from the Catholic Monarchs. In 1801, Alcalá de Henares was separated from the administration of Toledo and became capital of the administrative region. It also separated from Guadalajara, coming to form part of the region of Alcalá de Henares.

== Art ==
Among the buildings of the town, a magnificent parish Church of Nuestra Señora de la Asunción (Meco) stands out. It is dedicated to Our Lady of the Assumption, and is located on Plaza de la Constitución. Construction started in the middle of the 16th century in the Gothic Transitional style, and was completed in the 17th in Baroque style. The presbytery was therefore built of limestone masonry, while the sacristy and tower were brick.

A hall church with columns, its design has been attributed to Rodrigo Gil de Hontañón by some historians. It has three naves, the middle one with barrel vaults flattened at the top, and the lateral ones with pointed arches. Its Baroque dome is constructed on pendentives. It is surrounded by an atrium.

It was listed as an Artistic Historical Monument in 1982, and has been part of the Cultural Heritage of the Community of Madrid since 1992.

The town's main street also has fine examples of spacious historic houses.

There are two hermitages: that of Christ of Succour (Christo del Socorro, late 16th century?) and that of the Virgin (Virgen de la Cabeza, 17th century).

== Demographic development ==
demographic variation of the municipality between 1991 and 2005
2011	2009	2005	2004	2001	1996	1991	1980
12,554	12,419	10,774	9,986	8,267	4,142	2,928	1,117

== Public transport ==
Meco has a train station which connects the village with Guadalajara, Alcalá de Henares and Madrid, along with many other cities and villages. It is connected with A-2 highway. It also has two line buses, which are the following:

- Line 222: Madrid (Avenida de América) - Meco (ALSA)
- Line 250: Alcalá de Henares - Meco (ALSA)
