= Justus and Pastor =

Roman pair of Christian martyrs

Saints Justus and Pastor
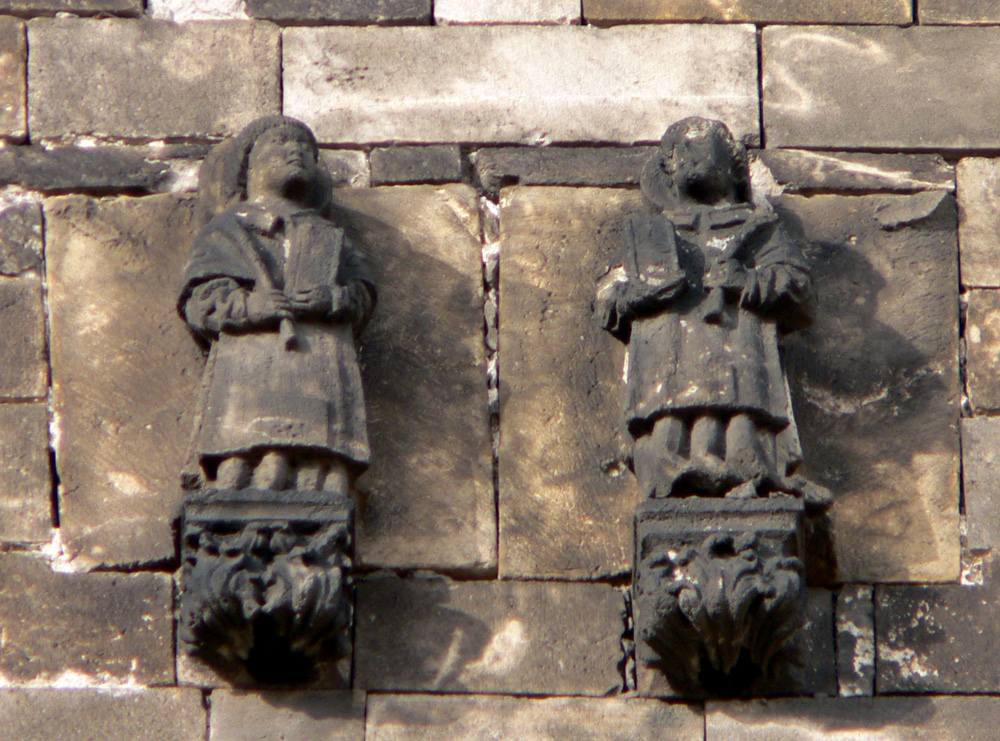
- Sculptures of Saints Justus and Pastor. Belltower of the church of Sant Just, Barcelona.

Child Martyrs
- Died: c. 304 outside Complutum
- Venerated in: Catholic Church; Eastern Orthodox Church
- Major shrine: Cathedral-Magistral of Saints Justus and Pastor
- Feast: 6 August
- Patronage: Alcalá de Henares

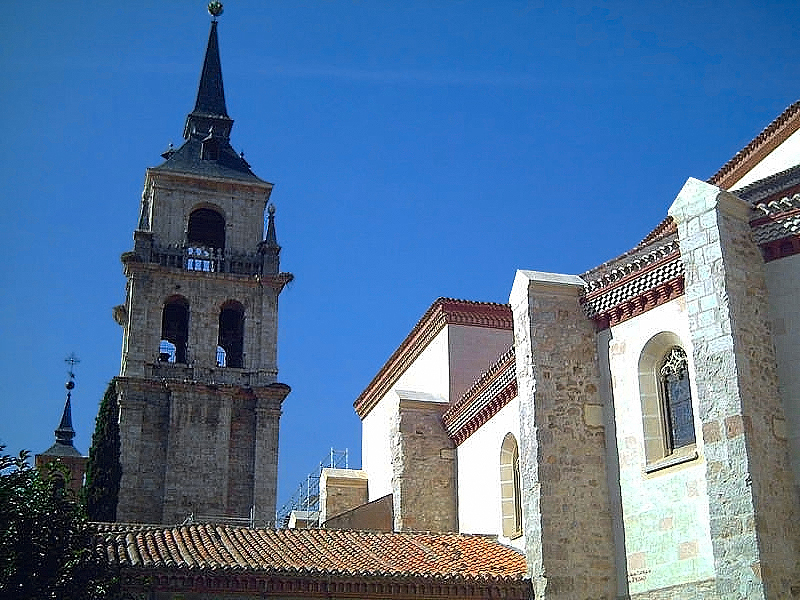
Tower of the Cathedral of the Santos Niños in Alcalá de Henares, Spain

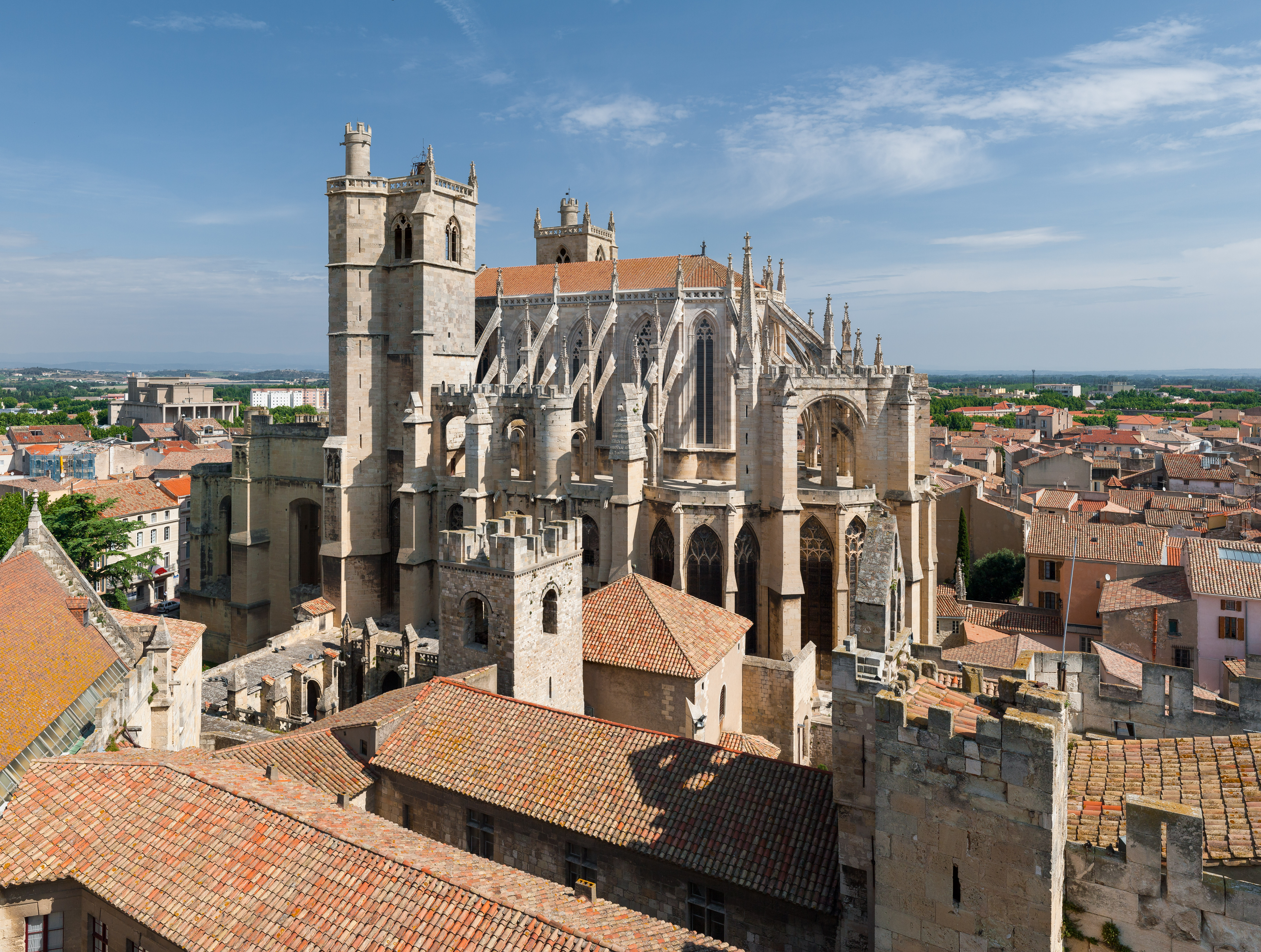
Cathedral of Saints Justus and Pastor of Narbonne, southern France

Justus and Pastor (Latin: Iustus et Pastor; died c. 304), venerated as Christian martyrs, were two schoolboy brothers (Justus was 13 years old, Pastor less than 9) who were killed for their faith during the Diocletian Persecution. The boys are today considered the patron saints of Alcalá de Henares. They are mentioned by the Christian poet Prudentius.

== Martyrdom ==
After the imperial proclamation was made public in Complutum, Justus and Pastor, were at school. Stimulated by their desire to give their lives for Jesus Christ, they chucked the tablets they used for writing and ran to Dacianus’ residence to bear witness of their faith to the point of martyrdom, despite their young age. They confessed to Dacianus that they were Christians and were reluctant to sacrifice to idols. He tried to win them over with gifts, but he was unable to persuade them. They were viciously flogged for denouncing the Roman religion and later beheaded in a place recorded in local tradition as the Campus Laudabilis outside Complutum, on the site of current-day Alcalá de Henares, Spain.

== Veneration ==
Relics believed to be those of Justus and Pastor were discovered in the 8th century and taken to Huesca. In 1568, they were brought back to Alcalá de Henares and interred beneath the high altar of the city's Cathedral-Magistral of Saints Justus and Pastor (known familiarly as the Catedral de los Santos Niños). Constructed between 1497 and 1514, the building is still in daily use, and the saints' tomb is accessible to the public.

The Basilica of Saints Justus and Pastor in Barcelona was erected in the 16th century in the Gothic style.

Narbonne Cathedral located in the town of Narbonne in southern France is also dedicated to Justus and Pastor.

== In popular culture ==
The story of Justus and Pastor is mentioned in the 2001 film The Others, where it is read by Nicholas (James Bentley), with his sister Anne (Alakina Mann) sitting nearby, under the supervision of their mother Grace Stewart (Nicole Kidman). The children find the story amusing, where Anne criticises Justus and Pastor as being "really stupid" for facing a gruesome martyrdom, when they could have lied to spare their lives. She tells her mother (Kidman), "Inside I would have believed in Him, but I wouldn’t have told the Romans that."

== See also ==
- Woman with seven sons
