= Santiago Cathedral =

Santiago Cathedral may refer to:

- Bilbao Cathedral, Spain
- Santiago de Compostela Cathedral, Spain
- Santiago Metropolitan Cathedral, Chile
