= Nicolás Antonio Castellanos Franco =

Spanish Roman Catholic prelate (1935–2025)

His Excellency Nicolás Antonio Castellanos Franco
- Bishop Emeritus of Palencia
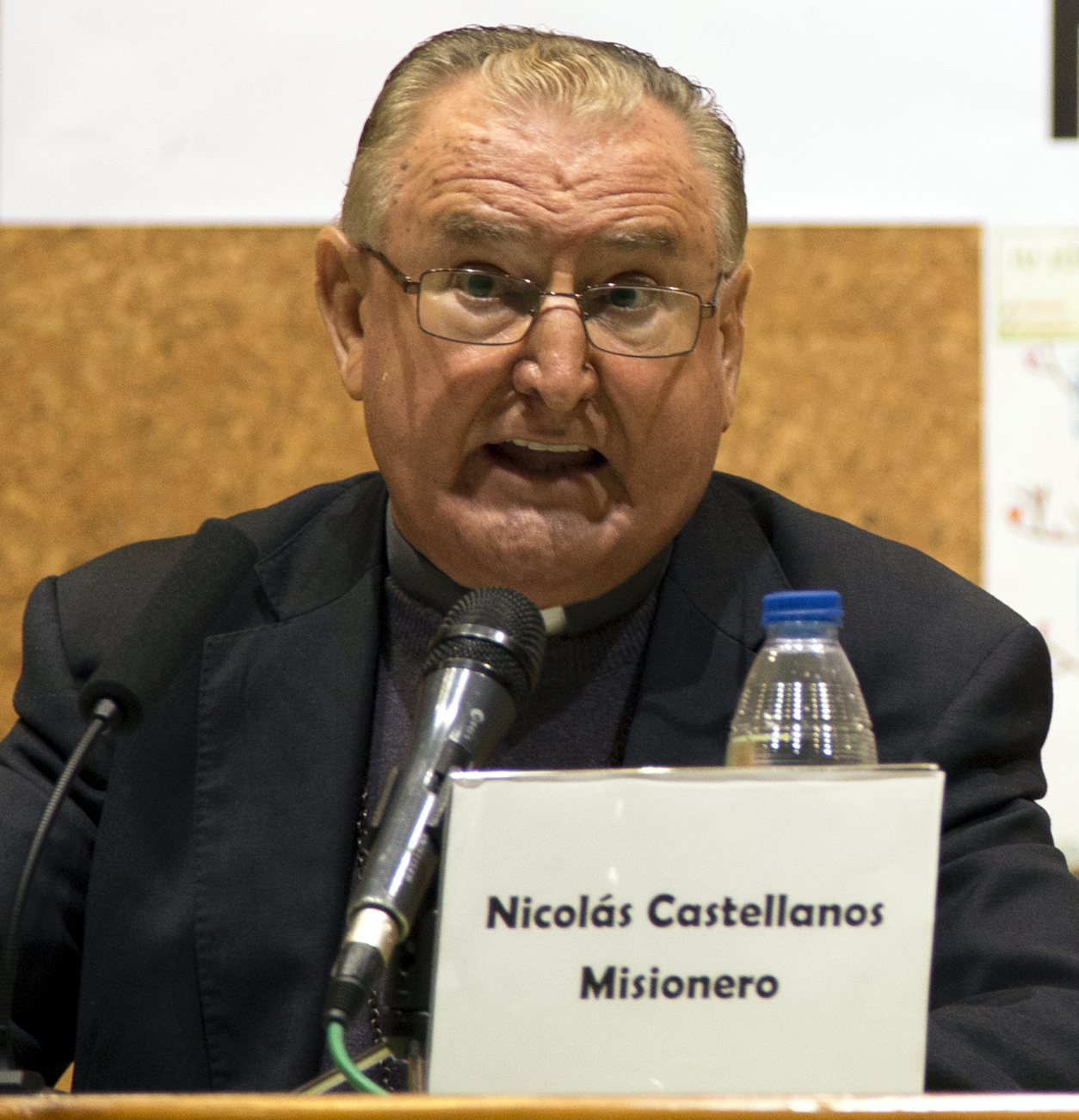
- Archdiocese: Burgos
- Diocese: Palencia
- Appointed: 27 July 1978
- Term ended: 4 September 1991
- Predecessor: Anastasio Granados García
- Successor: Ricardo Blázquez

Orders
- Ordination: 12 July 1959
- Consecration: 30 September 1978 by Luigi Dadaglio

Personal details
- Born: 18 February 1935 Mansilla del Páramo, Spain
- Died: 19 February 2025 (aged 90) Santa Cruz de la Sierra, Bolivia

Nicolás Antonio Castellanos Franco (18 February 1935 – 19 February 2025) was a Spanish Roman Catholic prelate and missionary. He was bishop of Palencia from 1978 to 1991.

Castellanos died on 19 February 2025, at the age of 90.

Catholic Church titles
| Preceded by Anastasio Granados García | Bishop of Palencia; 1978–1991 | Succeeded by Ricardo Blázquez |
