= Ricardo Blázquez =

Spanish cardinal (born 1942)

His Eminence Ricardo Blázquez
- Cardinal, Archbishop Emeritus of Valladolid
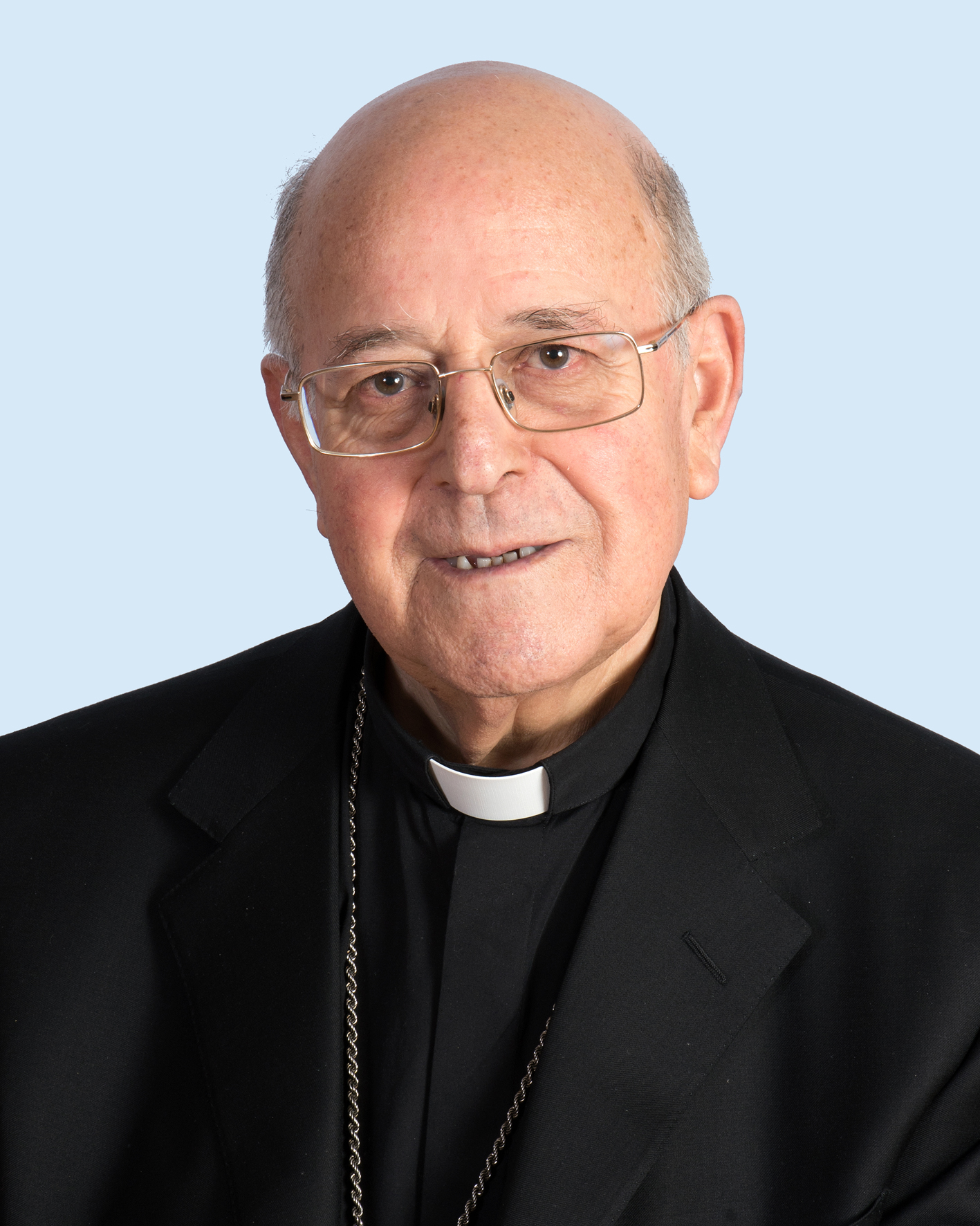
- Church: Catholic Church
- Archdiocese: Valladolid
- Appointed: 13 March 2010
- Installed: 17 April 2010
- Term ended: 17 June 2022
- Predecessor: Braulio Rodríguez Plaza
- Successor: Luis Javier Argüello García
- Other posts: President of the Spanish Episcopal Conference (2014–2020); Cardinal Priest of Santa Maria in Vallicella (2015–present)
- Previous posts: Auxiliary Bishop of Santiago de Compostela (1988–92); Titular Bishop of Germa in Galatia (1988–92); Bishop of Palencia (1992–95); Bishop of Bilbao (1995–2010); President of the Spanish Episcopal Conference (2005–08); Vice-President of the Spanish Episcopal Conference (2008–14)

Orders
- Ordination: 18 February 1967
- Consecration: 29 May 1988 by Antonio María Rouco Varela
- Created cardinal: 14 February 2015 by Pope Francis
- Rank: Cardinal Priest

Personal details
- Born: Ricardo Blázquez Pérez; 13 April 1942 (age 84) Villanueva del Campillo, Ávila, Spain
- Motto: Resurrexit (He has risen)
- Coat of arms: Ricardo Blázquez's coat of arms

Ordination history of Ricardo Blázquez
History
Episcopal consecration
- Principal consecrator: Antonio María Rouco Varela
- Co-consecrators: Ángel Suquía Goicoechea; Mario Tagliaferri
Cardinalate
- Elevated by: Pope Francis
Episcopal succession
Bishops consecrated by Ricardo Blázquez as principal consecrator
- Carmelo Echenagusia Uribe: 9 November 1995
- Mario Iceta Gavicagogeascoa: 12 April 2008
- Miguel Olaortúa Laspra, OSA: 16 April 2011
- Ángel Javier Pérez Pueyo: 22 February 2015
- Luis Javier Argüello García: 3 June 2016

Styles of Ricardo Blázquez Pérez
- Reference style: His Eminence
- Spoken style: Your Eminence
- Religious style: Cardinal
- Informal style: Cardinal

Ricardo Blázquez Pérez (Spanish pronunciation: [riˈkaɾðo ˈβlaθkeθ ˈpeɾeθ]; born 13 April 1942) is a Spanish prelate of the Roman Catholic Church. He was Archbishop of Valladolid from 2010 to 2022. He had been a bishop since 1988 and was made a cardinal in 2015, when he was described as "a theological moderate and perennial counterweight to Spain's more doctrinally conservative and socially combative prelates".

== Biography ==
Ricardo Blázquez Pérez was born in Villanueva del Campillo (Ávila) on 13 April 1942. He studied in the seminaries of Ávila from 1955 to 1967. He was ordained a priest on 18 February 1967. He then studied at the Pontifical Gregorian University, earning his doctorate in 1972. He also studied in Germany.

From 1972 to 1974 he served as secretary of the Theological Institute of Ávila. From 1974 to 1988 he was a professor and then from 1978 to 1981 the dean of the Faculty of Theology of the Pontifical University of Salamanca. He was Grand Chancellor there from 2000 to 2004.

He was named an auxiliary bishop of Santiago de Compostela and assigned the titular see of Germa di Galazia on 8 April 1988. He received his episcopal consecration on 29 May 1988 from Cardinal Antonio María Rouco Varela.

On 26 May 1992 Pope John Paul II named him Bishop of Palencia, and on 8 September 1995 Bishop of Bilbao. His appointment to Bilbao was protested by Basque nationalists.

In 2009, he was one of five bishops charged with conducting an investigation of the Legionaries of Christ, with responsibility for the order's branches in Spain, France, Germany, Switzerland, Ireland, Holland, Poland, Austria and Hungary. In September 2010, he was named to conduct an apostolic visitation of that order's lay apostolate, Regnum Christi, as well.

On 13 March 2010, Pope Benedict XVI appointed him Archbishop of Valladolid. He was installed there on 17 April.

He has served on various commissions within the Bishops' Conference of Spain including the Doctrine of the Faith, the Liturgical Commission and the Commission for Interconfessional Relations.

He was elected three times to a three-year term as president of the Spanish Episcopal Conference in 2005, 2014, and 2017. He was vice-president from 2008 to 2014. He was elected by that Conference to participate in the Synod of Bishops on the family in October 2014 and 2015. On 29 March 2014, Pope Francis made him a member of the Congregation for Institutes of Consecrated Life and Societies of Apostolic Life and he renewed this appointment for another five-year term on 8 July 2019.

On 4 January 2015, Pope Francis announced that he would make him a cardinal on 14 February. At that ceremony, he was assigned the titular church of Santa Maria in Vallicella. He was the first ordinary of Valladolid to become a cardinal since 1919, only the third in its 400-year history.

On 13 April 2015 Pope Francis appointed him a member of the Congregation for the Doctrine of the Faith and the Pontifical Council for Culture, and on 27 June 2015 of the Congregation for Oriental Churches. On 8 January 2016, Pope Francis named him a member of the Administration of the Patrimony of the Apostolic See. He was appointed a member of the Congregation for Divine Worship and the Discipline of the Sacraments on 28 October 2016.

In November 2015, the Spanish Episcopal Conference elected him grand chancellor of the Pontifical University of Salamanca, a post he had held once before.

He was one of three prelates the Spanish Episcopal Conference elected to participate in the Synod of Bishops on Youth in October 2018.

Pope Francis accepted his resignation as archbishop of Valladolid on 17 June 2022.

== See also ==
- Cardinals created by Francis

Catholic Church titles
Preceded by Nicolás Antonio Castellanos Franco	Bishop of Palencia; 1992–1995	Succeeded by Rafael Palmero Ramos
Preceded by Luis María de Larrea y Legarreta	Bishop of Bilbao; 1995–2010	Succeeded by Mario Iceta
Preceded by Braulio Rodríguez Plaza	Archbishop of Valladolid; 2010–2022	Succeeded by Luis Javier Argüello García
Preceded by Edward Bede Clancy	Cardinal Priest of Santa Maria in Vallicella; 2015–present	Incumbent
