= Antonio Añoveros Ataún =

Spanish Catholic prelate

- Bishop of Bilbao
- Church: Roman Catholic Church
- Diocese: Bilbao
- Installed: 3 December 1971
- Term ended: 25 September 1978
- Predecessor: Pablo Gurpide
- Successor: Luis María de Larrea y Legarreta
- Other posts: Auxilary Bishop of Málaga (1952–1954); Tiular Bishop of Tabuda (1952–1964); Bishop of Cádiz y Ceuta (1964–1971)

Orders
- Ordination: 25 July 1933
- Consecration: 12 October 1952 by Ángel Herrera Oria

Personal details
- Born: 13 June 1909 Pamplona, Spain
- Died: 24 October 1987 (aged 78) Bilbao, Basque Country, Spain

Ordination history
History
Priestly ordination
- Date: 25 July 1933
Episcopal consecration
- Principal consecrator: Ángel Herrera Oria
- Co-consecrators: Emeterio Echeverría y Barrena, Pablo Gurpide
- Date: 12 October 1952
Episcopal succession
Bishops consecrated by Antonio Añoveros Ataún as principal consecrator
- Juan Uriarte: 11 October 1976

Antonio Añoveros Ataún (13 June 1909 – 24 October 1987) was a Spanish Roman Catholic priest and bishop. He is known mostly as a protagonist of the so-called "Añoveros case", a 1974 episode which marked the gravest crisis in relations between Francoist Spain and the Church. Though during the Civil War he joined Carlists, he is recognized chiefly as one of the most liberal members of the Spanish hierarchy during the late Francoism; he is appreciated especially in the Basque realm.

== Family and youth ==
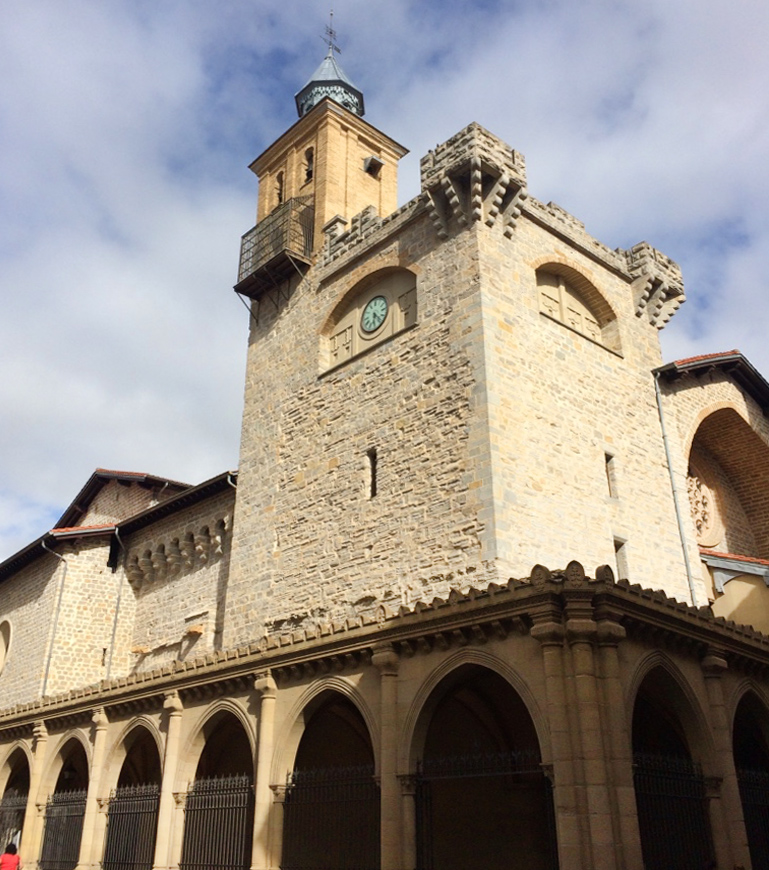
San Nicolas church, Pamplona

Añoveros' paternal family originated from the Madrid province. His grandfather, Guillermo Añoveros Ribas (1817–1897), settled in Navarre due to his duties of Carabinero de la Hacienda Nacional, the Spanish customs service. Antonio's father, Julio Añoveros Monasterio (1867–1939), directed Tabacalera de Navarra, local section of the Spanish tobacco monopoly, and worked for the Pamplona city council as secretary of Junta de Beneficiencia de Navarra. Since 1928 he was elected Teniente de Alcalde and presided over Comisión de Beneficiencia; he was also recognized as author of pieces posted to local periodicals. Antonio's maternal family came from central Navarre; his mother, Claudia Ataún Sanz (1881–1975), originated from Irurozqui. The couple had 4 children.

On the insistence of his devoutly religious mother, Antonio was first educated in the Marist Brothers' college in Pamplona. Having obtained the bachillerato he moved to Aragon, studying derecho civil at Universidad de Zaragoza. According to some sources he pursued law studies and sacerdotal education at the same time, according to the other he abandoned university witnessing the rising tide of militant secularization; determined to confront it he returned to his native city and entered the seminar. He was ordained priest in 1933 and posted to the St. Nicholas parish in Pamplona. In the mid-1930s he assumed teaching duties at the Pamplona seminary and animated local Acción Católica.

None of the sources referenced below provides information on Añoveros' political activities prior to the July 1936 coup. Upon the outbreak of the Civil War his older brother, Julio Añoveros Ataún, joined the Carlist Requeté militia; Antonio followed suit and enlisted as a chaplain. The exact unit, timing and location of his service are not known; one author claims he served in hospitals and similar facilities, though also in a machine-gun battalion. He is recorded as having administered sacraments also to the Republican soldiers. Añoveros was involved in matanza de Valcardera, the second-largest mass execution in Navarre; he was one of 6 priests confessing 52 inmates about to be executed. He later claimed to have been terrified by the scene and named the day the worst in his life; he turned gray the following night. None of the few witness accounts available – including his own – notes he protested the killings. Some authors claim the local hierarchy was aware and approved of the executions.

Carlist standard

Prior to the Unification Decree Añoveros featured prominently in plans, drafted by Junta Nacional Carlista de Guerra and to be executed upon taking Madrid. They envisioned formation of Christianization Columns, units entrusted with propaganda and religious activities until the Church structures were re-established in the capital; Añoveros was selected to head the Navarrese column, supposed to act in the Puerta del Sol quarter. These plans were cancelled by political developments within the Nationalist camp; Añoveros continued serving as a chaplain and was noted in Carlist auxiliary units on the Castellon front in 1938. He did show up in Madrid carrying out proselytizing activities once the city had been taken in 1939: he was noted as engaged in distribution of El Pensamiento Navarro, the sole Carlist daily spared amalgamation in the Francoist propaganda machinery.

== Early ecclesiastical career ==
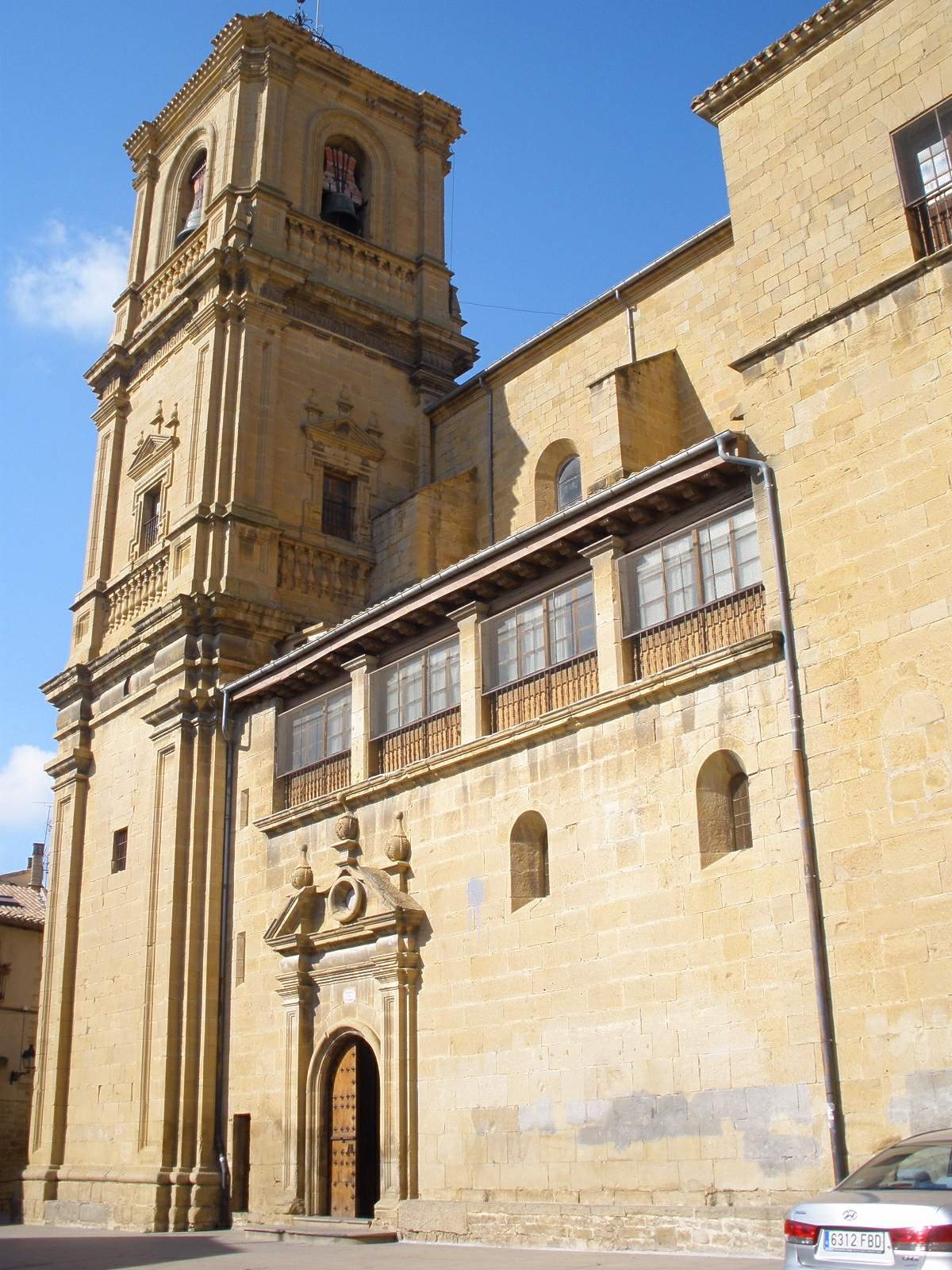
S. Maria church, Tafalla

At some point Añoveros became vicedirector of a diocesan Pamplonese weekly La Verdad. It is not entirely clear when he ceased as a parish priest for St. Nicholas in Pamplona; during the war he was officially delegated to Delegación de frentes y hospitales, a branch of Falange catering for the wounded; no earlier than in 1939 Añoveros was nominated representative of the diocese to the Casa del Consiliario de Madrid and in this capacity he made few trips abroad. Afterwards he was appointed primer capellán and professor at Escuela Nacional de Mandos del Frente de Juventud, an institute designed to train the Falangist youth cadres. This assignment was terminated in 1942, when he assumed the Santa Maria parish in the central Navarrese town of Tafalla; he was also appointed director of the local Casa Sacerdotal Diocesana. He passed into the living memory of the local population as a young, ingenious and resolute priest, trying to serve the poor community the best; he continued at the post until 1950.

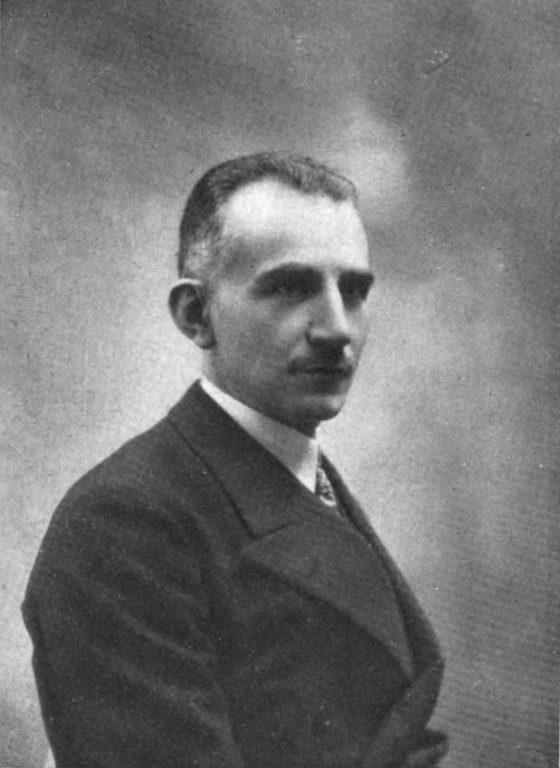
Ángel Herrera Oria (earlier photo)

In early 1950 Añoveros left Navarre for Andalusia; he was appointed canónigo de la catedral in Málaga. He rose also to Director Espiritual del Seminario Conciliar, rector of the local seminary, and performed some other minor duties. Working closely with the charismatic figure of the Málaga bishop Angel Herrera Oria, Añoveros grew to his right-hand and in 1952 was elevated to vicar-general of the diocese. In 1952, promoted by Herrera Oria (who also acted as his principal consecrator), Añoveros was nominated the Malaga Auxiliary Bishop; his titular see was Tabuda. In late 1954 he moved to Western Andalusia, nominated the Coadjutor Bishop of Cádiz and Ceuta. In this new post he remained influenced by the strong personality of the aging titular bishop of the province, Tomás Gutiérrez Díez.

Himself coming from an accommodated family, Añoveros had already developed an interest in social issues when in the Pamplona seminary; he pursued it animating the local Acción Católica, first during the Republic and later during the Civil War. At both his Andalusian assignments he continued co-operation with Acción Católica as its local delegado episcopal, becoming also increasingly involved in charity as Delegado Diocesano de Caridad. He was noted as demonstrating utter interest in the poor, frequently visiting the city suburbs. At that time his relations with Spanish government seemed excellent: a former Carlist chaplain and mentor of Falangist youth cadres, in the early 1950s he was taking part in venerating ceremonies to honor Francisco Franco; a photograph of Añoveros friendly chatting with the Caudillo was splashed across front pages upon his assumption of the Cádiz post.

== Second Vatican Council ==
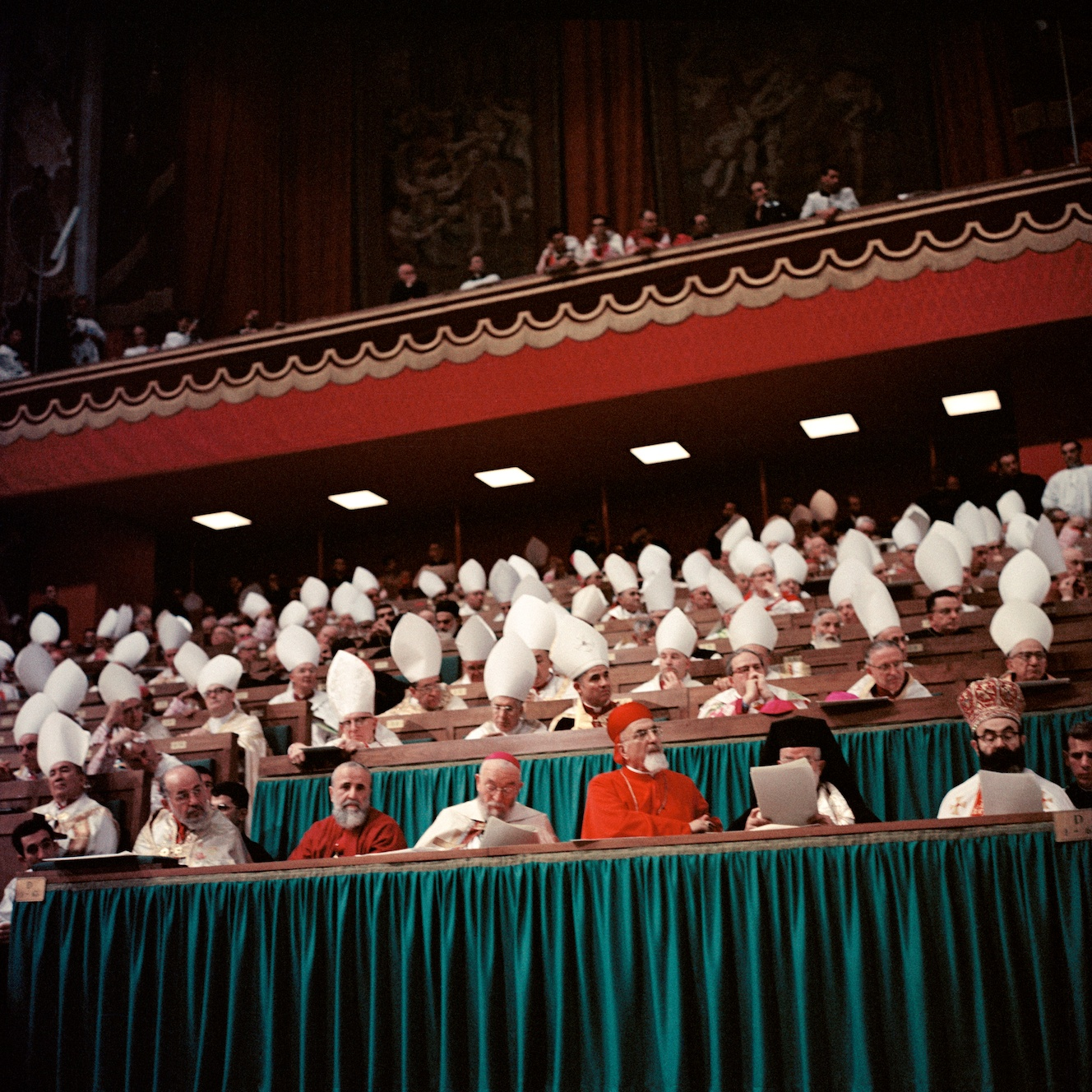
Vaticanum II at work

Prior to Vaticanum II the Spanish preliminary input was rather modest. On the central theme of the Church itself it was reduced to a petition, fathered by Añoveros jointly with the Jaca bishop Ángel Hidalgo Ibáñez, that the doctrine of Cuerpo Místico deserves more elaboration. During the Council itself he participated in all 4 sessions from 1962 to 1965. Though Spanish bishops as a group constituted one of the most conservative blocs of the assembled hierarchy, Añoveros emerged in the middle, siding neither with the reformist nor with the conservative wing. His contribution to the Second Vatican Council was moderate; though he was counted among the 3,000 Council Fathers, he neither chaired any section nor was particularly active on any specific topic. However, he took part in a number of debates.

The liturgical reform focused on enhanced participation of lay people in the mass. Añoveros was in the majority favoring introduction of the vernacular, resulting in the sixth amendment to the constitution on liturgy (Sacrosanctum Concilium, 1963); it allowed a freedom of action while at the same time making provision for an increased use of modern languages in the liturgy. When discussing the role of deacons, priests and bishops in church modus operandi and the decision making process, finally summarized in Dogmatic Constitution of the Church (Lumen gentium, 1964), Añoveros spoke in favor of the priesthood being treated more thoroughly in the scheme; he effectively backed the supporters of permanent deaconry and collegiality of bishops. He also voiced strongly in favor of setting regional seminars. During the work on Declaration on the Relation of the Church with Non-Christian Religions (Nostra aetate, 1965) he emerged as a moderate, referring specifically to the Muslims as profoundly religious and very aware of charitable work. He perceived the Christian-Muslim dialogue as feasible and insisted that it be enhanced, stressing that the Christians respectfully recognize Muslim spiritual and moral values and that all missionary endeavors should be tailored accordingly.

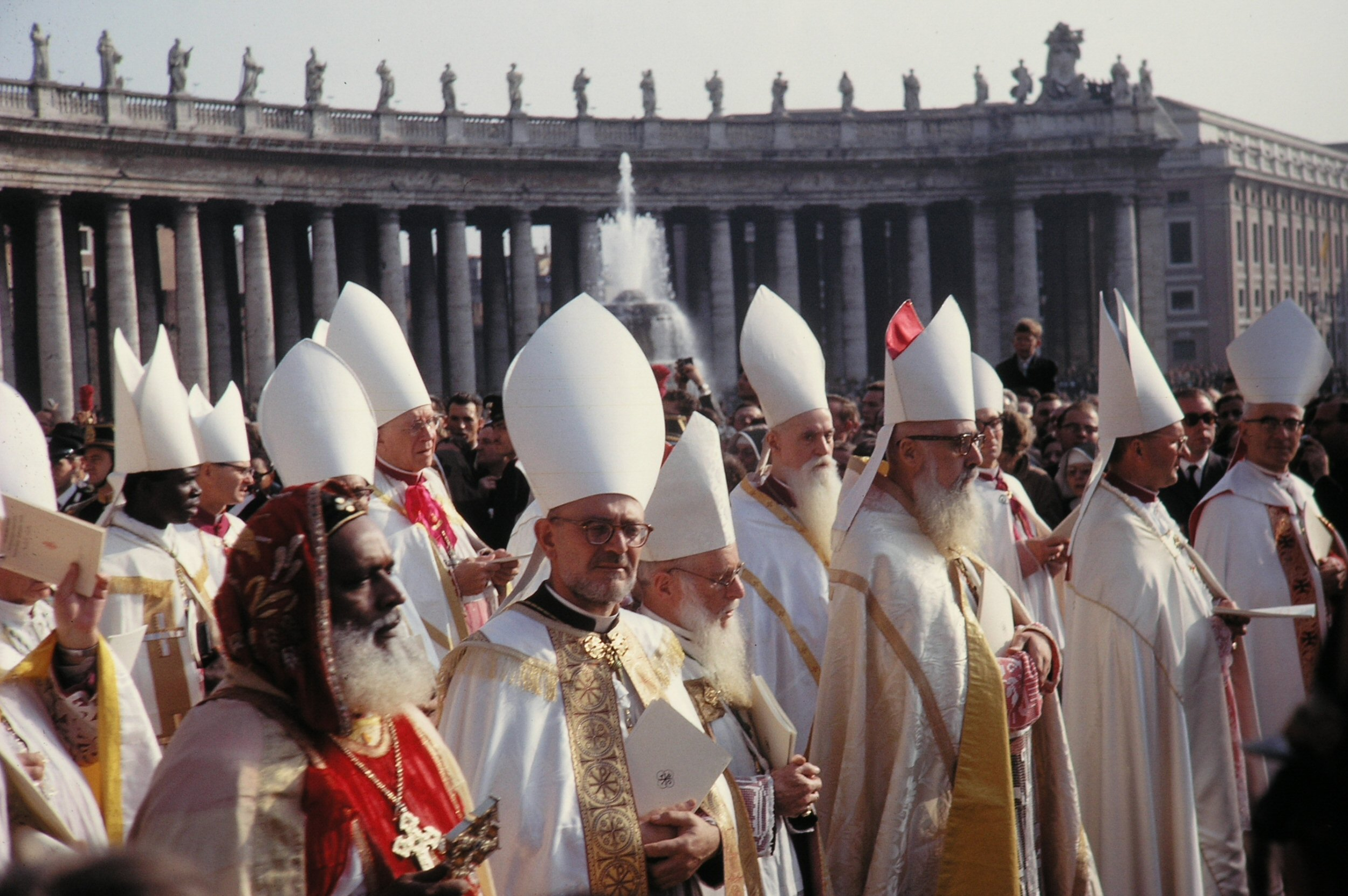
Pzza S. Pietro, Vaticanum II

Contributing to Declaration on Religious Freedom, (Dignitatis Humanae, 1965), and especially during the discussion on the so-called 4 SC (textus reemendatus), Añoveros spoke against the version prepared by the Council for Promoting Christian Unity and joined the 70-something group of bishops who formed part of the opposition nucleus. Though far from the fundamental rejection advocated by Marcel Lefebvre (or even critique from some fellow Spaniards like Abilio del Campo), Añoveros called for setting limits of religious liberty. He argued that the state had the right to limit religious freedom to safeguard three values: a political good, that is the public peace: a moral good, that is the defense of public morality; and a civil good, that is the harmony of citizens in the exercise of their legitimate rights. He suggested further elaboration of the text during works of a new sub-commission, and called for changing the title, suggesting Civil Liberty in Religious Matters instead.

== Bishop of Cádiz and Ceuta ==
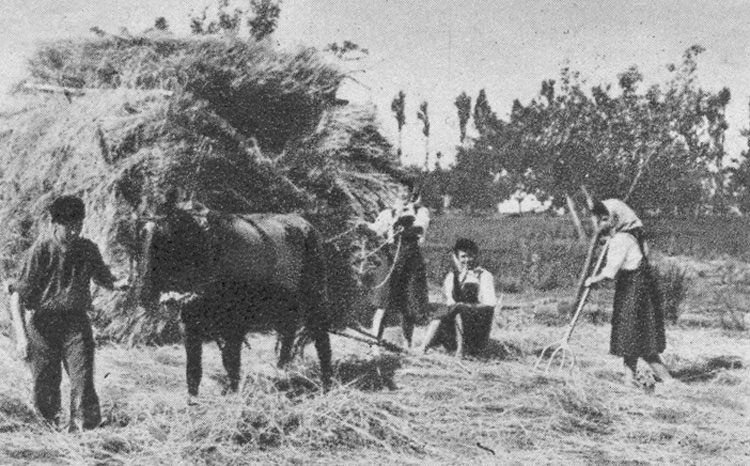
mid-Francoism, Spanish peasants

Following the death of Tomás Gutiérrez Díez, in 1964 Añoveros succeeded him as titular bishop of Cádiz and Ceuta. Although for long periods he was absent from the area on account of his Second Vatican Council engagements, he is said to have ruled the diocese with an iron hand; his key concerns having been the seminary and social issues. It is also at his Cádiz-Ceuta assignment that he gained nationwide recognition.

Up to a certain point Añoveros' focus on poverty, injustice, labor and social issues in general appeared to have been in line with the syndicalist Falangist viewpoint, but already when assisting Herrera Oria in Málaga his relations with the Movimiento were cooling. Añoveros' increasingly vocal support for Catholic labor groupings, Hermandad Obrera de Acción Católica (HOAC) and Juventud Obrera Cristiana de España (JOC), was putting him on a collision course with the official policy, especially as the organizations were assuming an alternative and challenging role. Some of his gestures looked like manifestos, which pitted the world of poverty against that of glamour and officialdom. Also in his sermons he embraced similar threads, e.g. when he lamented the plight of agricultural workers in Andalusia and lambasted lack of social conscience by the upper strata. However, at that time Añoveros was careful not to enter an openly confrontational path; in 1966 he presided over the 1966 Ceuta celebrations of 30th anniversary of "Convoy de la victoria".

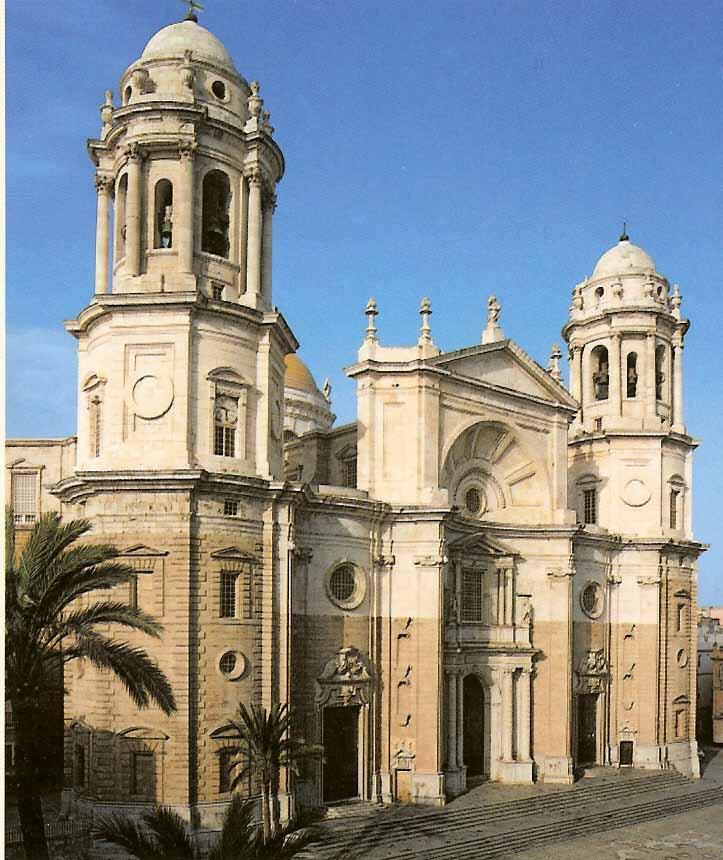
Cadiz cathedral

After the death of the conservative primate Enrique Pla y Deniel Añoveros became more vocal within the Spanish episcopate; he co-engineered condemnation of the official unions, declared by the Bishops Conference in July 1968. Gradually his articles in HOAC bulletins, sermons and pastoral letters were assuming increasingly severe tone; some references, like the ones about "the oppressed", were no longer compatible even with most flexibly applied official line. Apart from focus on social issues Añoveros advocated also a new Church animated by the Vaticanum II spirit; he also voiced in favor of family values in what seemed like confronting a new, consumer lifestyle. With the censorship almost lifted, in the late 1960s his sermons were getting widely quoted in the Spanish press; their author gained a nationwide recognition, e.g. declared Person of the Year by the Catalan periodical Mundo in 1970.

Añoveros approved of and supported the phenomenon of „curas obreros”, encouraging seminarians from Cádiz to take up labor assignments in local industry. This, combined with his focus on social issues and down-to-earth profile of a "parish bishop", drew comparisons to Hélder Câmara, chief exponent of the Latin American so-called liberation theology, though Añoveros never admitted to embracing the concept. At the turn of the decade Spain's officials lost any illusions they might have had about Añoveros; at one point police suspected him of running a communist cell and in 1971 Dirección General de Seguridad counted him, together with Vicente Tarancón and Narciso Jubany, among "jerarquías desafectas".

== Bilbao: "caso Añoveros" and afterwards ==
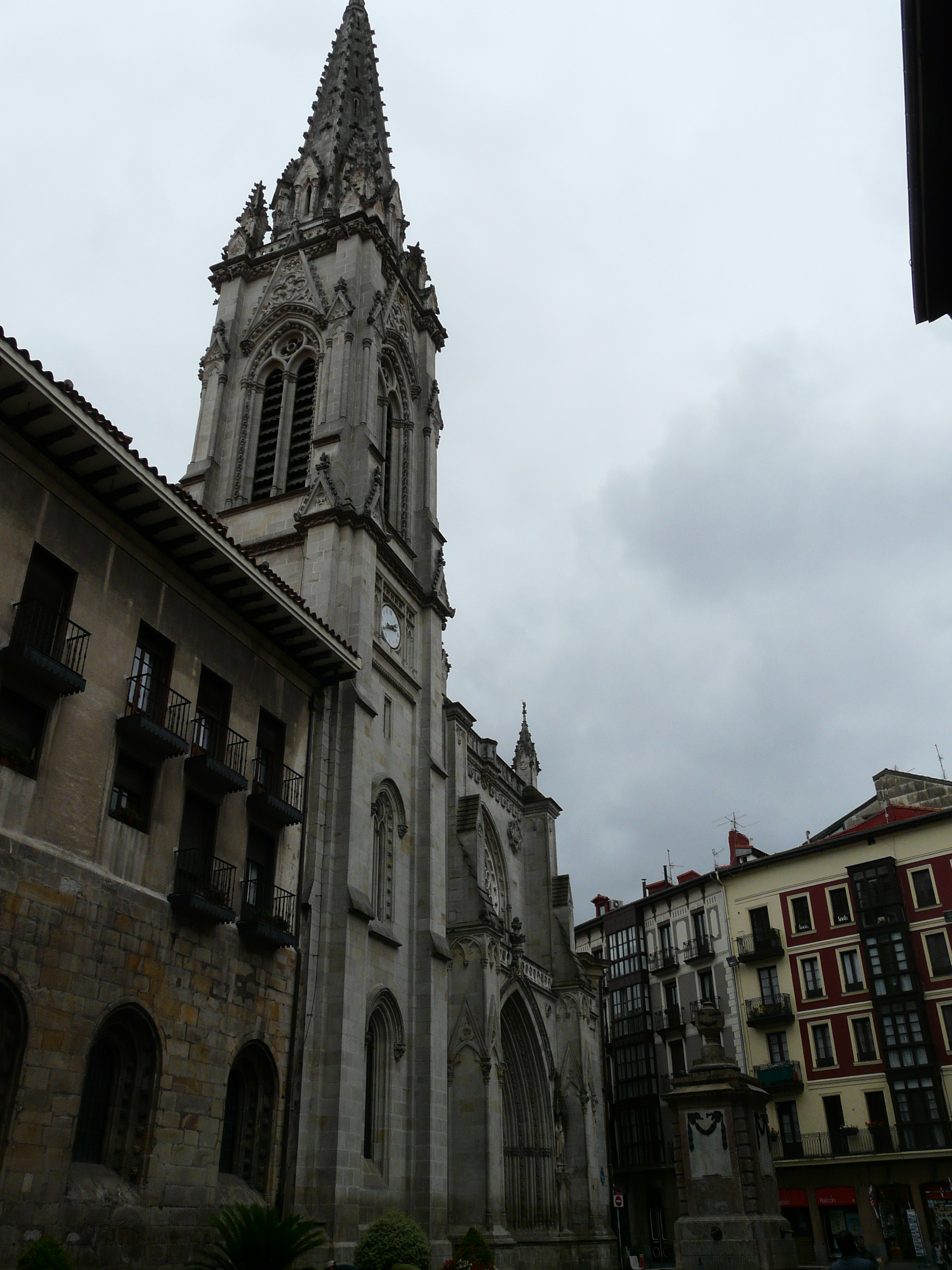
Bilbao cathedral

In December 1971 Añoveros was nominated the bishop of Bilbao. He was short-listed as the only candidate, a workaround employed by Vatican to dodge the concordat and deny Francoist Spain the opportunity to influence the process; the official government response claimed that the government demonstrated good will and consented. On the other hand, some scholars claim that Franco actually wanted Añoveros to land in Bilbao, hoping that his image of a popular hierarch would help to pacify the unruly region. This version seems corroborated by the fact that Consejo Presbiteral de Bilbao initially opposed Añoveros' nomination, reportedly concerned about his Carlist and Falangist record.

Añoveros quickly identified himself as sympathetic towards Basque nationalism. He refused to attend official feasts along the Francoist hierarchs, established a good working relation with the local vehemently pro-Basque clerical entourage, and spoke in defense of persecuted nationalist clergymen; he also did his best to derail legal proceedings against those charged with subversive propaganda, like in a 1973 case of 4 priests from Portugalete.

The scarcely-veiled conflict with Francoist Spain exploded in February 1974, when Añoveros issued a pastoral letter titled El Cristianismo, Mensaje de Salvación para los pueblo. In general it referred to papal teaching, but at one point and in an almost Aesopian language it called for Basque cultural freedom and a change in governmental policy on regional rights. There is conflicting historiography on the issue; some authors consider the wording miscalibrated, others suggest it might have been intended as a test of officially declared good intentions. The document, issued 2 months after ETA terrorists assassinated Carrero Blanco, triggered the gravest crisis between Spain and the Church. The cabinet of Carlos Arias ordered Añoveros' house arrest and sent a plane to Bilbao to fly him out into exile, while some bishops threatened excommunication of Francoist officials in return. Franco, aware of unofficial papal support for the bishop and asked for moderation by the primate González Martín, has eventually overruled Arias and got the crisis defused while Añoveros was arranged to go on a long vacation.

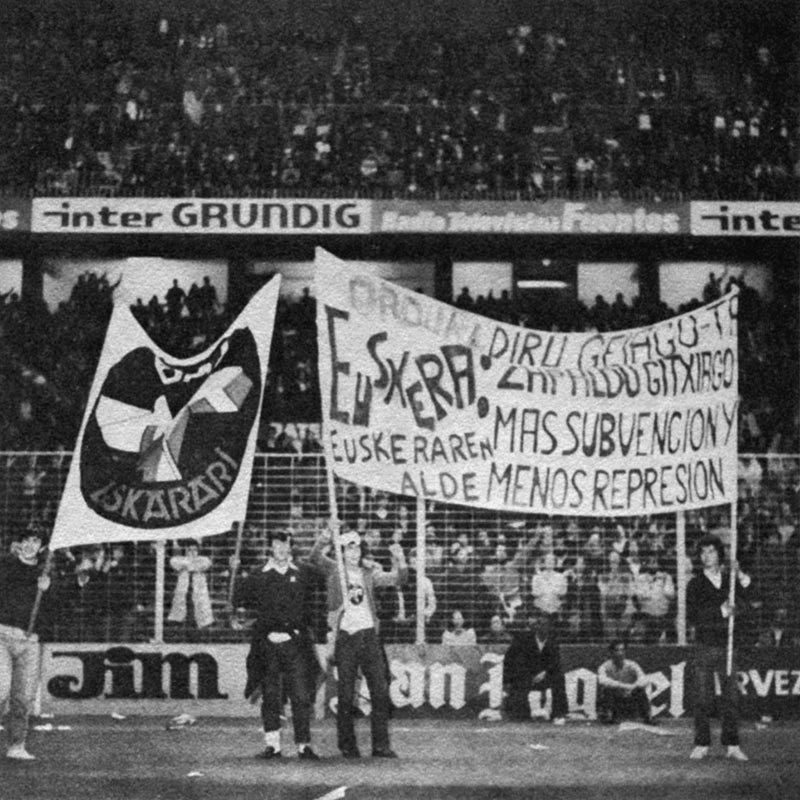
Basque rally, Bilbao, late 1970s

Añoveros returned to Bilbao during final months of Francoism, though at that time he was already suffering from cardiac problems and from 1976 he would spend long periods away undergoing treatment. In the heat of the ongoing transición he tended to avoid political issues, though he used to meet new public officials; his sermons and letters focused rather on the Church, stressing its holy nature and steering clear of social rationalizations. In 1977 he was nominated Prince Assistant to the Pontifical Throne. In 1978 he resigned due to poor health; becoming bishop emeritus of the diocese. From that moment onwards he departed from public life; offered residence in Pamplona, on insistence of the locals he chose to stay in Bilbao. Since 1984 he was in grave condition; in 1985 he suffered a stroke and died due to pulmonary disease.

== Reception and legacy ==
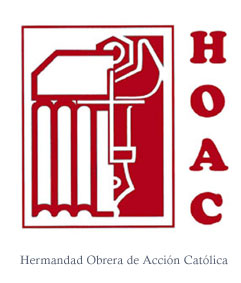
current HOAC logotype

In the late 1960s Añoveros acquired a sort of a celebrity status; in the mid-1970s the "caso Añoveros" became a major event widely discussed nationwide and also abroad, earning him position of a political protagonist. However, following his resignation the media focus shifted away. At times and usually due to his health problems mentioned in the press as bishop emeritus, he is now referred to as "living in the shadow" during the 1980s; it was rather his nephew, Jaime Garcia Añoveros, who at that time attracted more attention. Añoveros' death was noted by all major Spanish media and acknowledged with highly sympathetic obituaries, which underlined his interest in social issues and highlighted the 1974 showdown. It is also with reference to "caso Añoveros" that he was being occasionally noted by the press afterwards. Its 30th anniversary in 2014 produced some commemorative notes, all of them hailing the protagonist and crediting him for pro-democratic posture, social sensitivity, support for regional identities and endorsing a modern Church. He is generally counted among most progressive sections of the Spanish episcopate during late Francoism. At times is referred to as a role model, juxtaposed against unprogressive sectors of present-day Spanish clergy, though some authors consider him a conservative. He is particularly appreciated within the Basque realm, where some media name him, along Mateo Múgica and José María Setién, the key or the most quoted bishop in the history of the national Church. Remembered as "a good shepherd", Añoveros has even earned a poem in Basque.

Attempts to commemorate Añoveros in public space are relatively modest; he is honored by one street, a short backyard drive in Puerto Real near Cádiz. In 2015 the Bilbao diocese established the Fundación canónica autónoma de Centros Diocesanos Antonio Añoveros, intended to support local religious educational establishments. He has earned no scientific monograph so far, be it either a major volume or a review article, though "caso Añoveros" is treated at length in few works on the Francoist era.

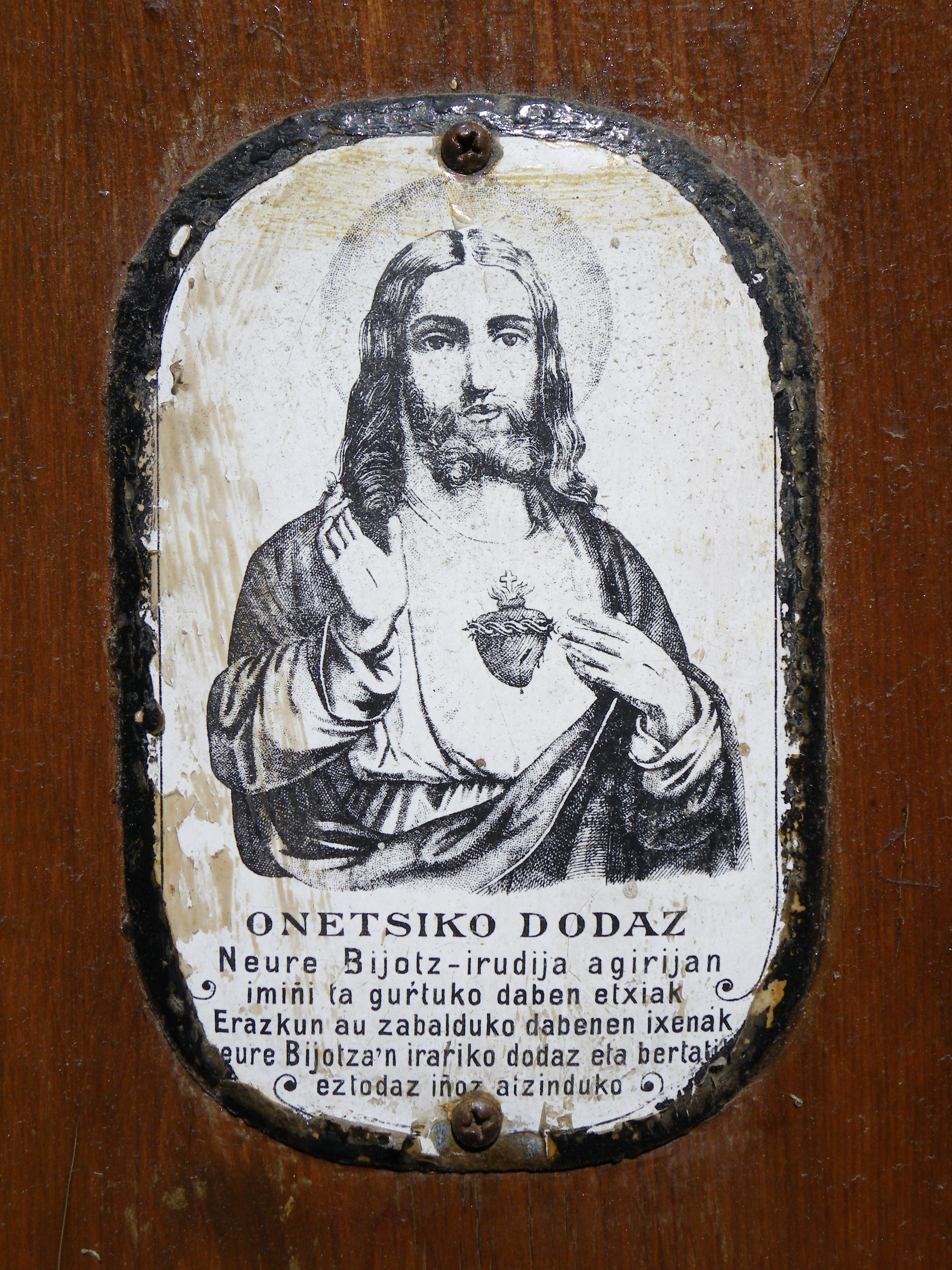
Basque Catholicism

Though overwhelmingly appreciated as contributing to democratic transformation of Spain, Añoveros did not escape some criticism. Within the Carlist realm already in 1974 he was considered a subversive progressist; a note by Traditionalist pundit Elías de Tejada ironically demanded that his call for honoring regional rights be met by restoring traditional Biscay regulations, which in turn would trigger fueros-based proceedings against Añoveros. A present-day Traditionalist intellectual, José Miguel Gambra, lines up Añoveros, and especially his stress on individual and collective liberties, within the trend which contributed to de-Christianization of Spain. Finally, some authors mention his name when referring to ambiguous stance of Basque hierarchs on nationalist violence, the position which raised concerns already at the time. They note that across the 1970s the bishops have never explicitly condemned the ETA terror campaign; while often voicing enigmatically against unspecified violence, they relativized the phenomenon by seeking its root causes in lack of civil liberties and heavy-handed policing.

== See also ==
- Carlism
- Francoist Spain
- Basque nationalism
- Spanish Transition
- Vaticanum II
