= Bilbao Cathedral =

Catholic Cathedral in Bilbao, Spain

- Cathedral Basilica of Saint James
- Basílica Catedral de Santiago; Done Jakue Basilika-Katedrala
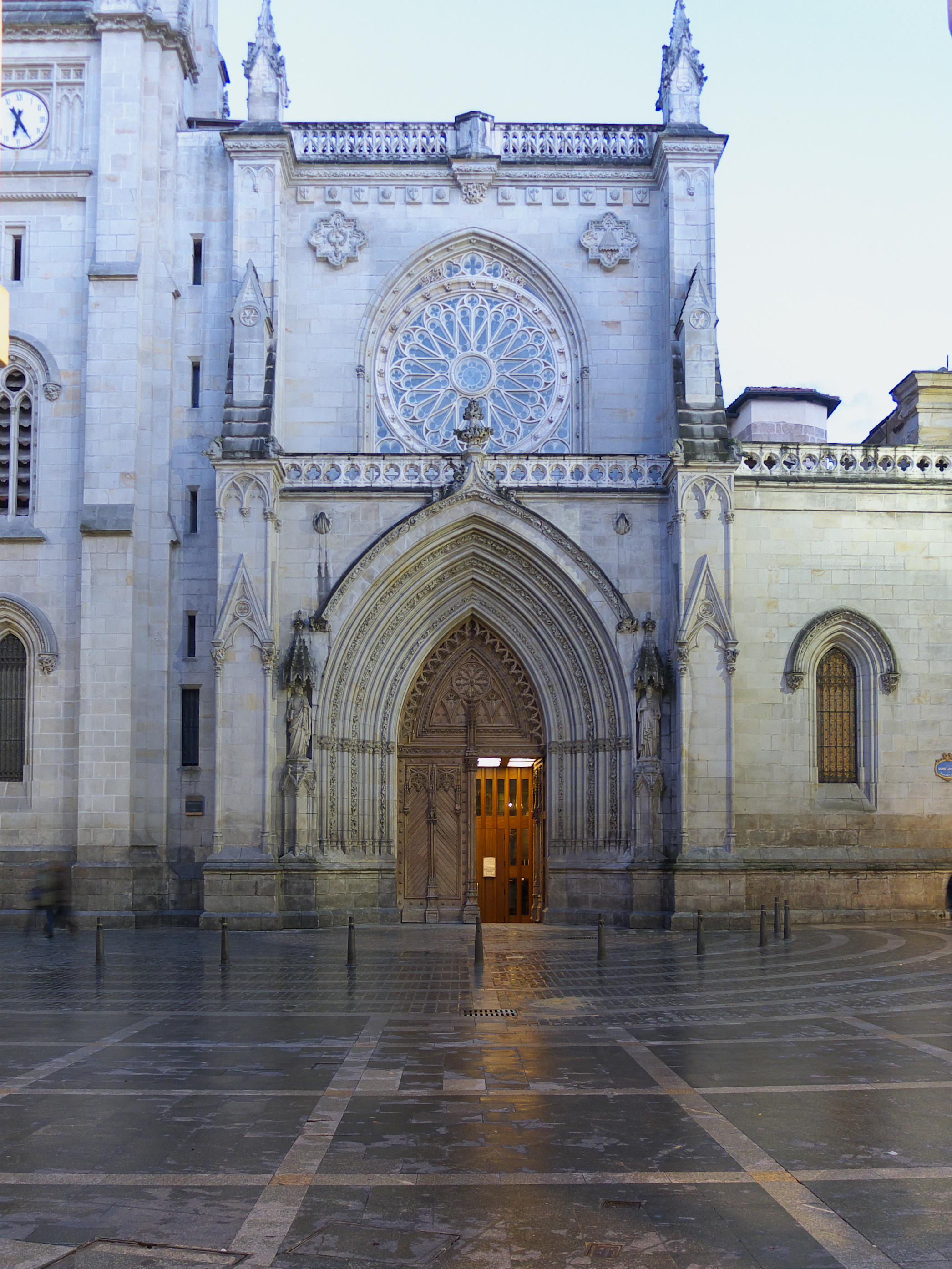
- West portico.
- Bilbao Cathedral
- 43°15′25″N 2°55′26″W
- Location: Bilbao
- Address: 1, Done Jakue Plazatxoa
- Country: Spain
- Denomination: Catholic
- Website: catedralbilbao.com

History
- Status: Cathedral
- Dedication: James the Great
- Dedicated: 30 December 1955

Architecture
- Style: Gothic, Gothic Revival
- Groundbreaking: 14th Century
- Completed: 15th Century

Administration
- Metropolis: Burgos
- Diocese: Bilbao

Clergy
- Bishop: Joseba Segura Etxezarraga

UNESCO World Heritage Site
- Criteria: Cultural: (ii), (iv), (vi)
- Designated: 2015 (39th session)
- Part of: Routes of Santiago de Compostela: Camino Francés and Routes of Northern Spain
- Reference no.: 669bis-010

Spanish Cultural Heritage
- Type: Non-movable
- Criteria: Monument
- Designated: 3 June 1931
- Reference no.: RI-51-0001010

The Cathedral Basilica of Saint James (Spanish: Basílica Catedral de Santiago; Basque: Done Jakue Basilika-Katedrala) is a Catholic cathedral in Bilbao, Spain. It serves as the seat of the Diocese of Bilbao, which was established in 1949.

It is dedicated to the apostle James the Great, by virtue of being a point of transit for the pilgrims that followed the Northern Way of the Camino de Santiago. In 2015, it was declared a UNESCO World Heritage Site together several other buildings along the route.

== History ==
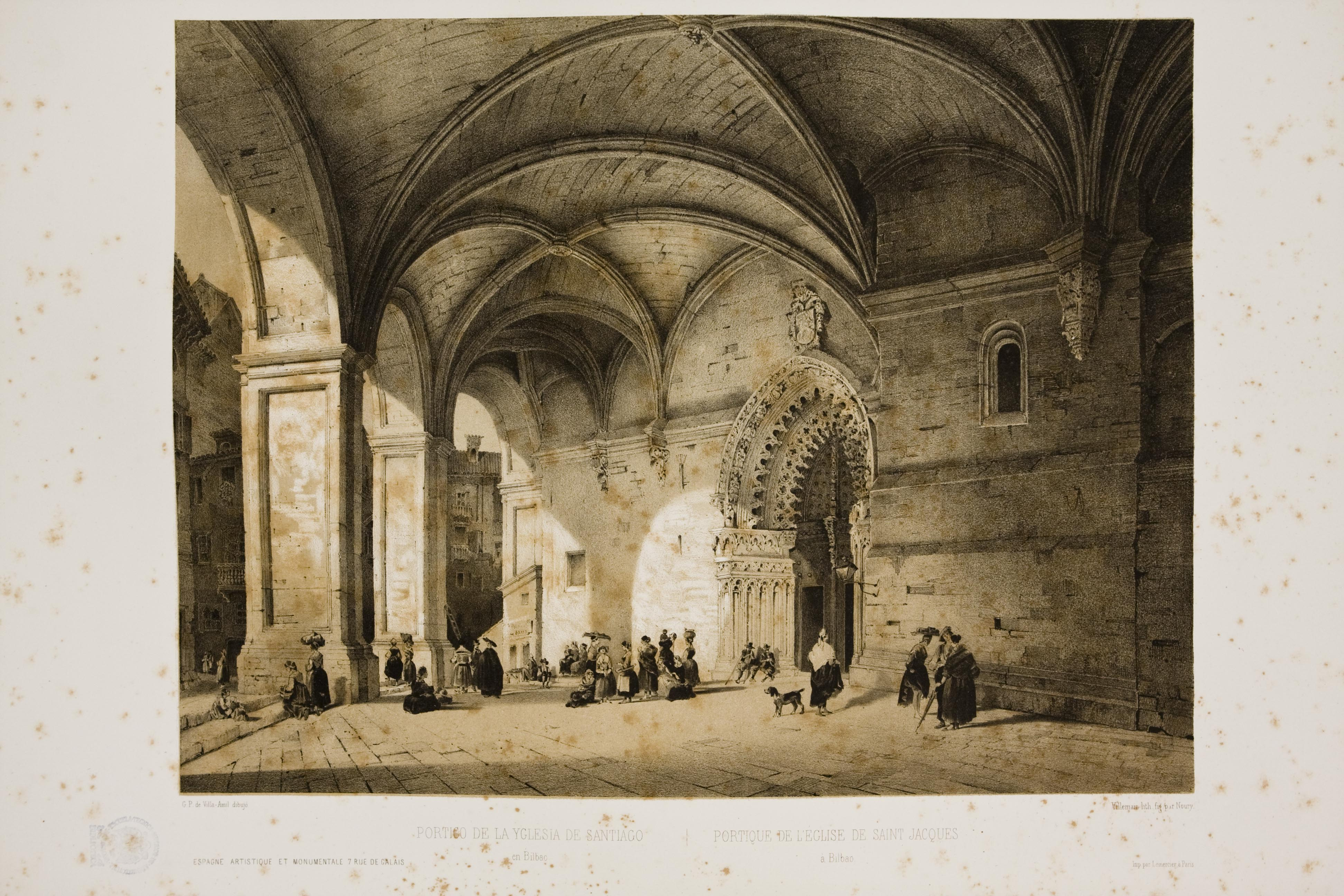
Porch and south portico, by Jenaro Pérez Villaamil (1850).

The origins of the site predate the official foundation of the villa of Bilbao in 1300, originating as a modest sanctuary or hermitage dedicated to Saint James the Apostle that served local fishermen and merchants, as well as passing pilgrims.

Construction of the current Gothic temple began during the last quarter of the 14th century. Over the centuries, the building underwent various modifications, expansions, and restorations to adapt to urban growth and architectural trends. In 1819, it was declared a minor basilica. A major transformation took place in the late 19th century, notably during the 1880s under architect Severino de Achúcarro, which reshaped parts of the exterior. During these 19th-century campaigns, earlier additions such as the old neoclassical tower and a classicist entrance frontispiece were removed and replaced to give the cathedral its current neo-Gothic profile.

It was elevated to cathedral status on 30 December 1955, after the Roman Catholic Diocese of Bilbao was officially created.

== Architecture ==
=== Exterior ===
The exterior of the Bilbao Cathedral reflects a blend of styles dominated by its foundational Basque Gothic architecture, alongside later neo-Gothic interventions. One of its most notable exterior features is the Puerta del Ángel (also known as the Pilgrims' Door), a Florid Gothic portal facing north toward Calle Correo that provides access to the cloister. The masonry throughout the structure is remarkably uniform, constructed using high-quality ashlar sandstone.

=== Interior ===
Inside, the cathedral presents a monumental spatial arrangement characterized by its soaring ribbed vaults and classic Gothic floor plan. The interior stonework features distinctive warm tones, ranging from toasted hues to wine-colored shades with natural veins. The layout includes a spacious central nave flanked by side aisles, a transept, and an ambulatory wrapping around the main altar, harmonising structural elegance with medieval devotional art.

== Gallery ==
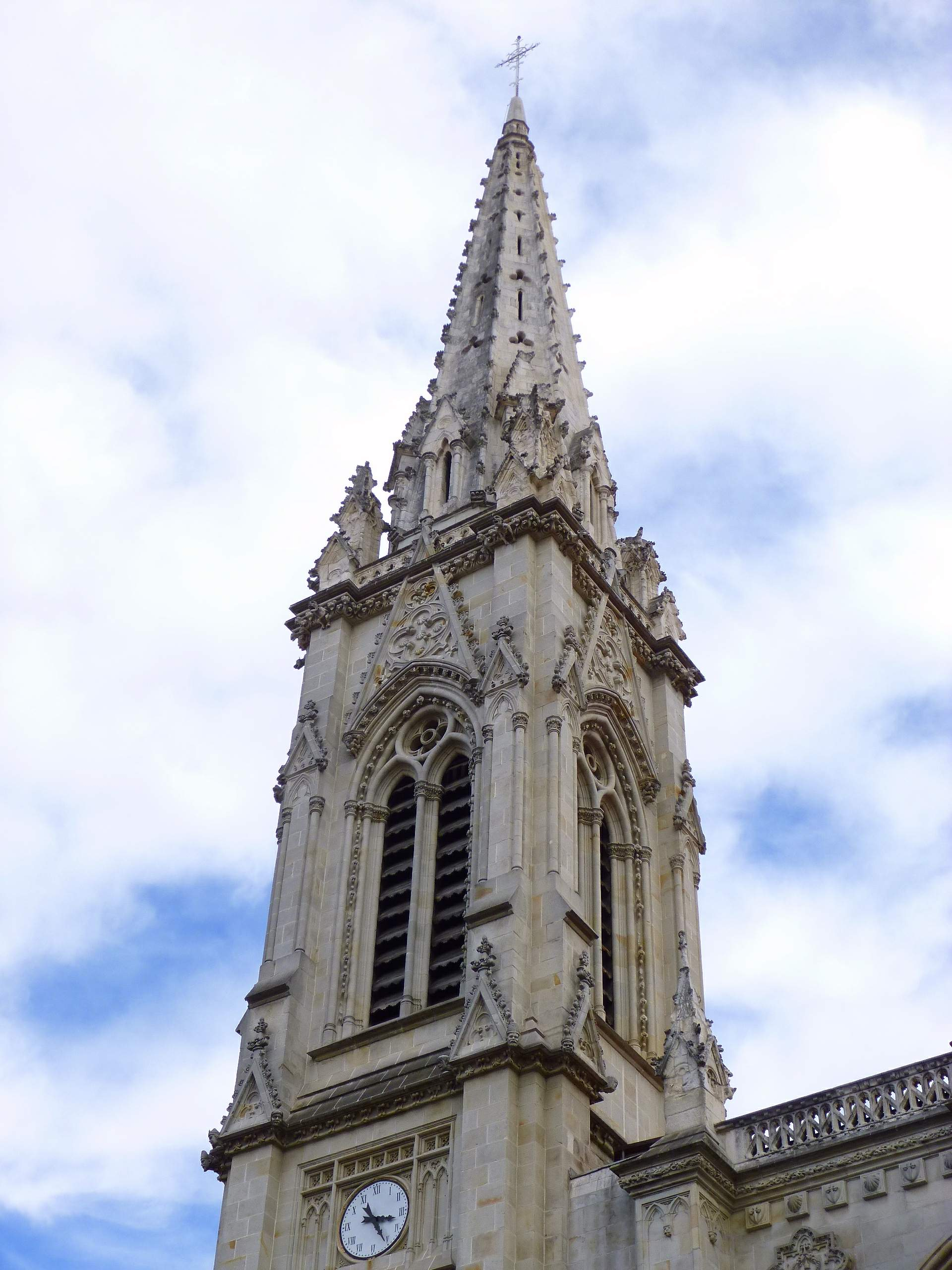
Bell tower.

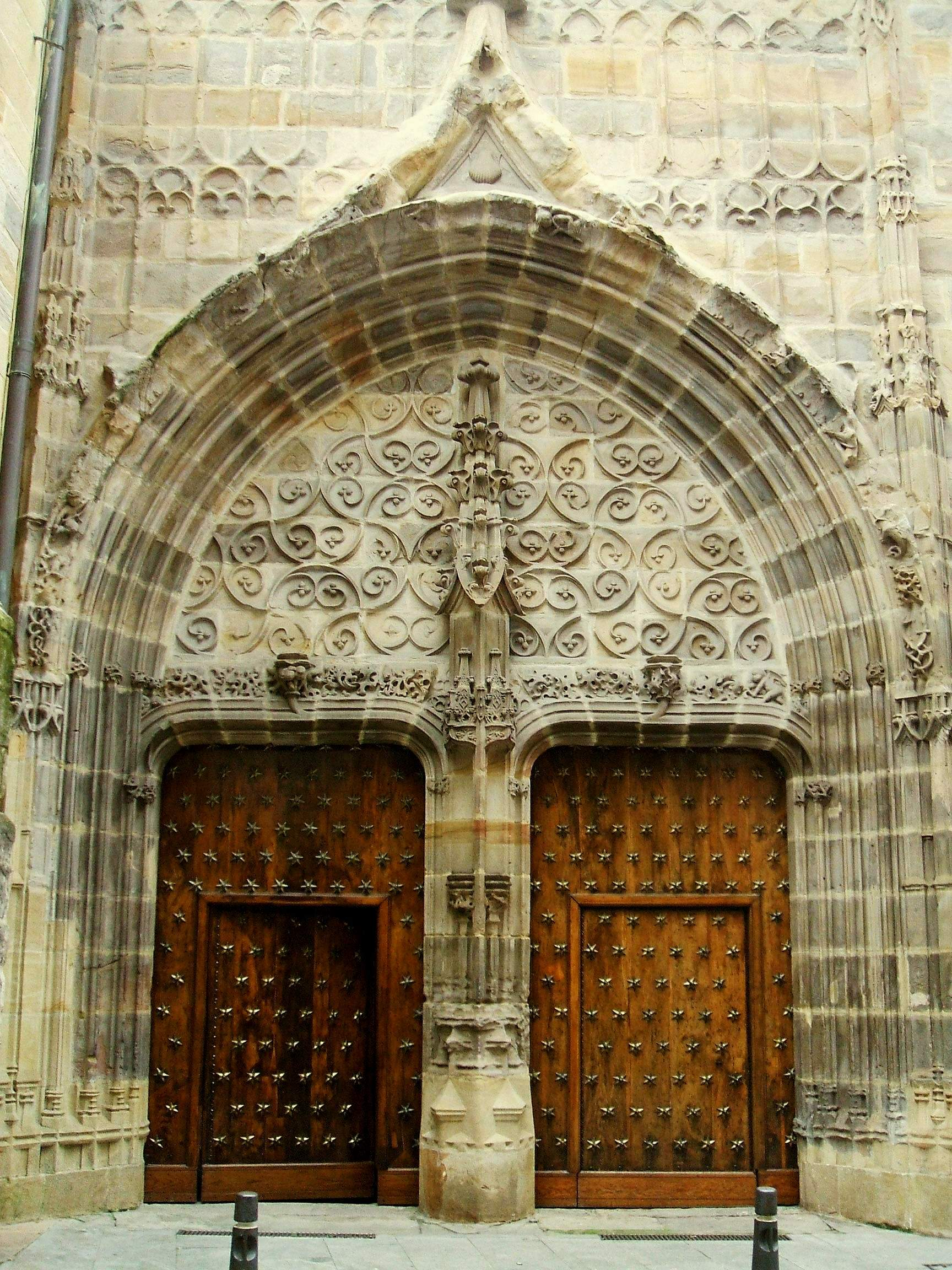
Portico of the Angel.

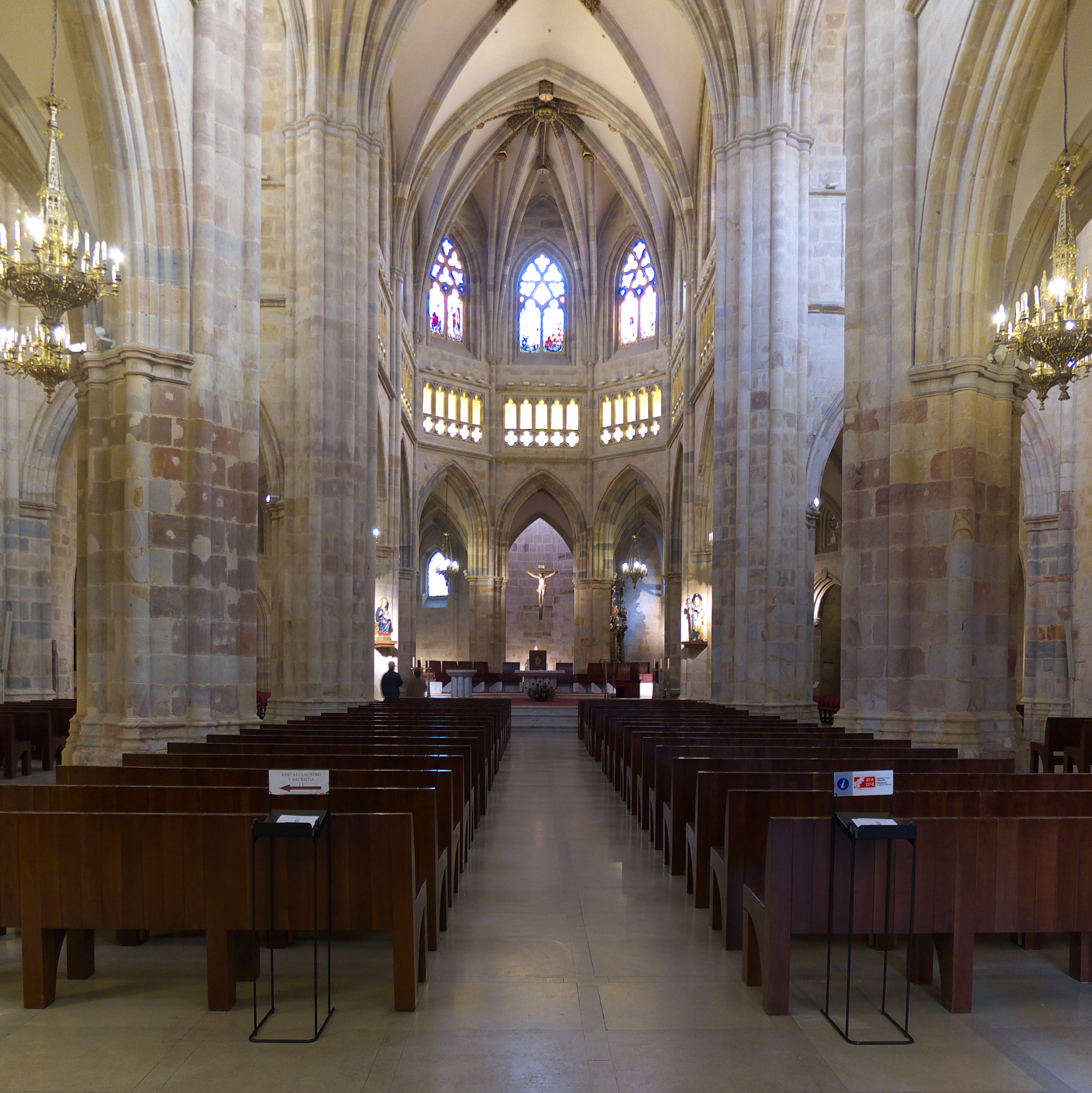
Central nave.

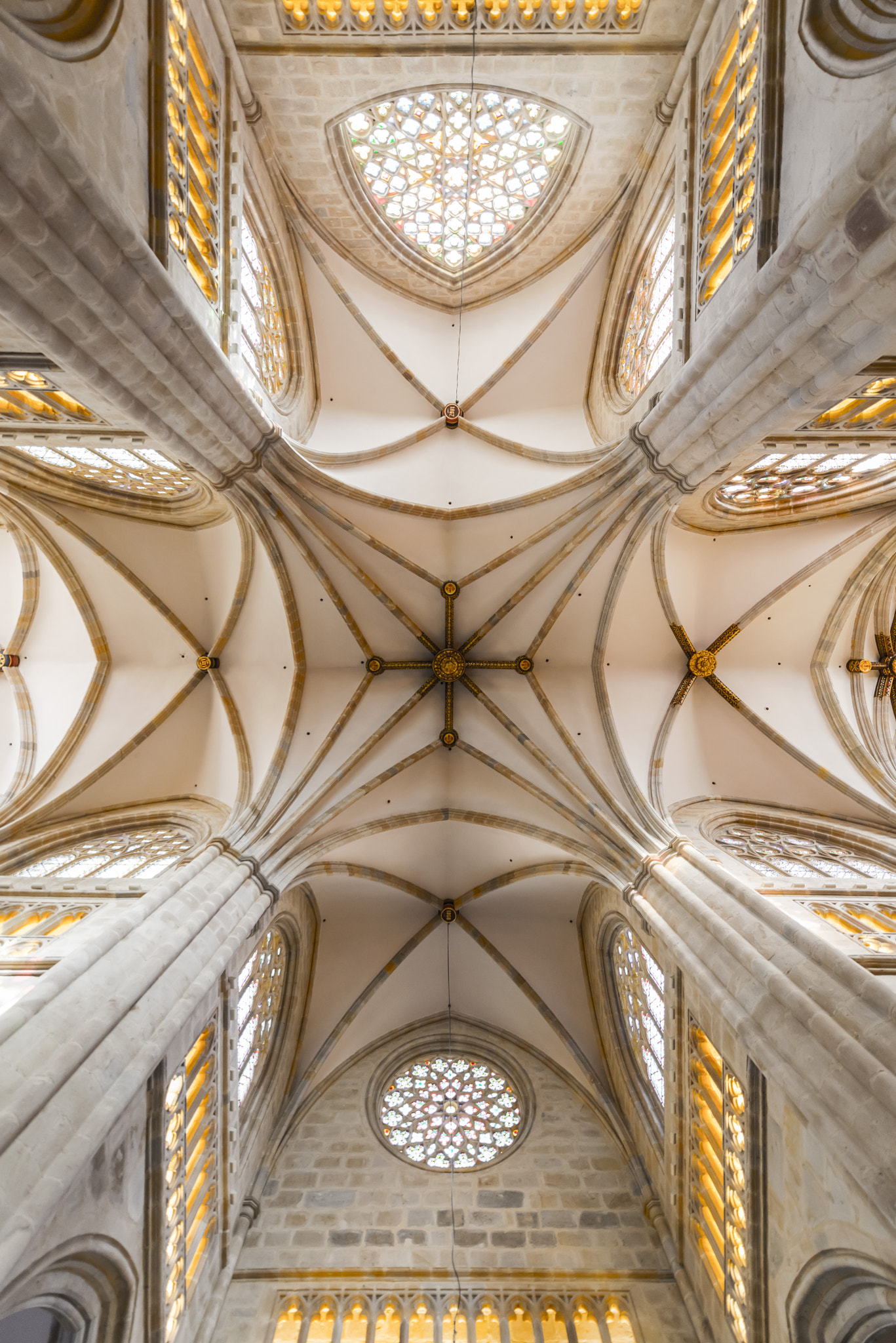
Vaults.

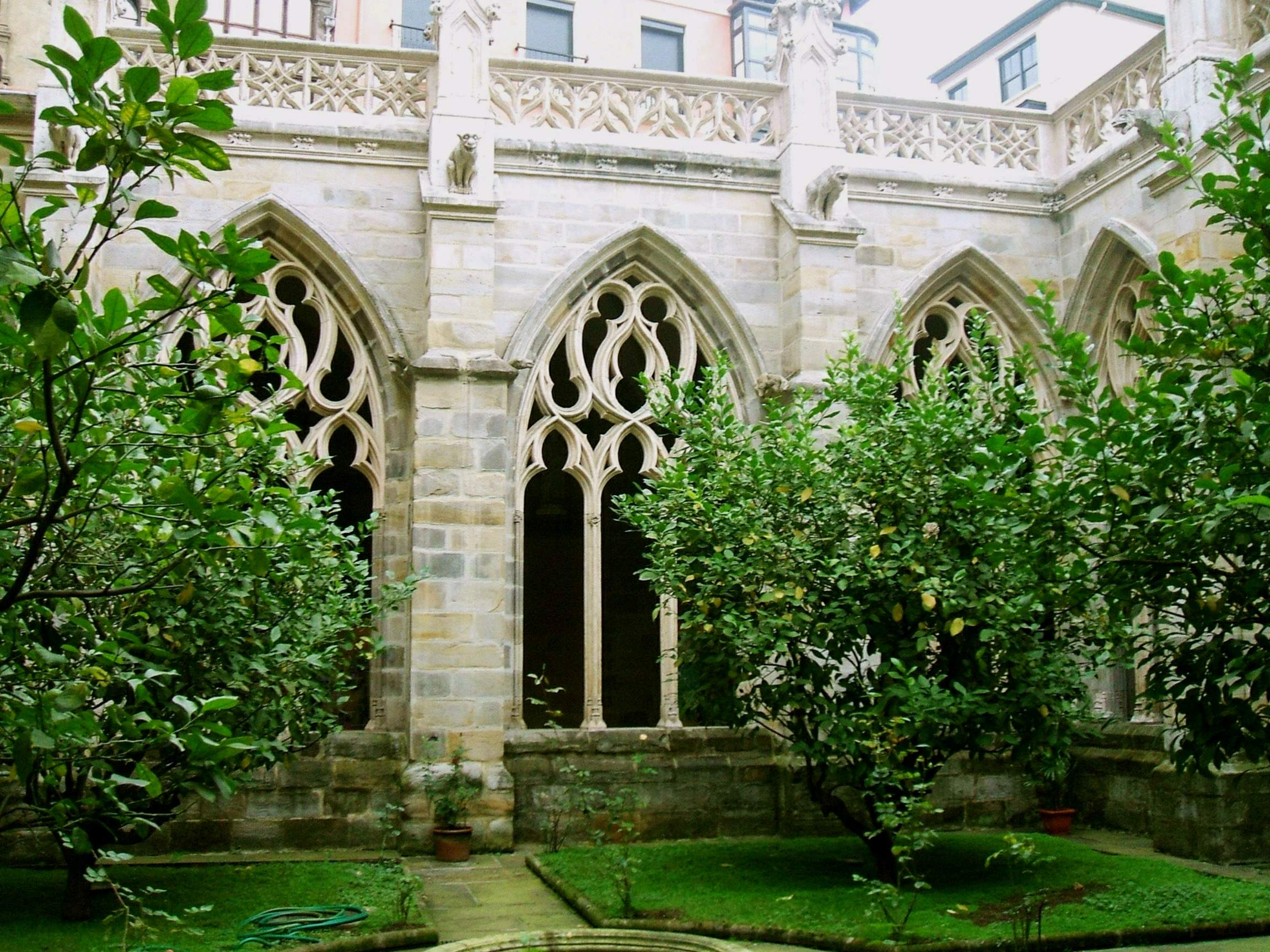
Cloister.
