= Mario Iceta =

Spanish Catholic bishop (born 1965)

The Most Reverend Mario Iceta Gavicagogeascoa
- Archbishop of Burgos
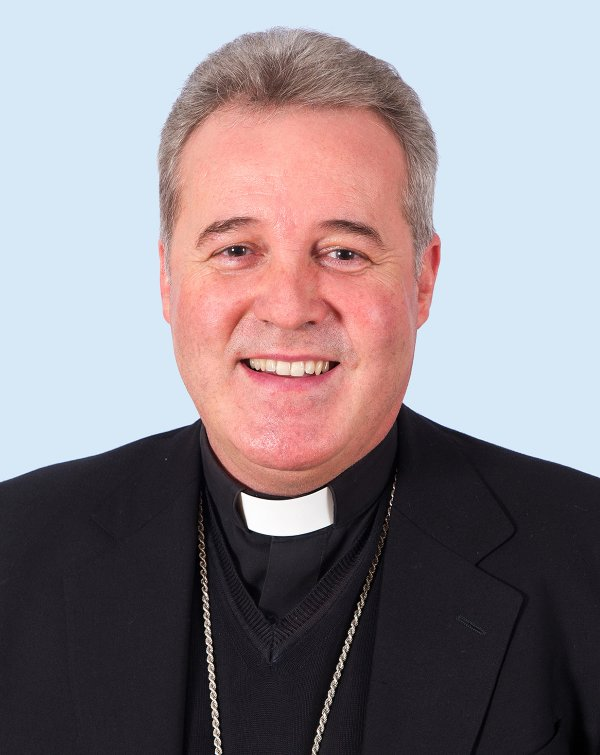
- Church: Roman Catholic
- Diocese: Bilbao
- Installed: 2010
- Predecessor: Ricardo Blázquez Pérez
- Previous posts: Titular Bishop of Alava (2008–2010); Auxiliary Bishop of Bilbao (2008–2010); Bishop of Bilbao (2010–2020)

Orders
- Ordination: 16 July 1994 by José Antonio Infantes
- Consecration: 5 February 2008 by Ricardo Blázquez Pérez

Personal details
- Born: 21 March 1965 (age 61) Guernica, Spain
- Education: University of Navarra
- Motto: Omnium Servus
- Coat of arms

Mario Iceta (born 21 March 1965) is a Spanish prelate of the Roman Catholic Church. He has been serving as archbishop of Burgos since his installation on 5 December 2020. He previously served as auxiliary bishop (2008-2010) and bishop (2010-2020) of Bilbao.

== Early life ==
Mario Iceta Gavicagogeascoa was born on 21 March 1965 in Guernica, Basque Country.

He earned a licentiate degree in medicine and surgery from the University of Navarra from 1984 to 1990. After additional coursework in clinical pathophysiology from 1990 to 1992, he obtained a doctorate in bioethics and medical ethics in 1995. He studied philosophy and theology at the same university from 1988 to 1992 and at the Seminary of Córdoba from 1992 to 1994 and received a licentiate degree in theology at Comillas Pontifical University in 1994. He received a licentiate degree moral theology (1999) and a doctorate (2002) at the John Paul II Pontifical Theological Institute for Marriage and Family Sciences.

== Early priesthood ==
Iceta was ordained a priest of the Diocese of Córdoba on 16 July 1994. He was member in solidum of the priestly group of Priego de Córdoba (1994-1997); Pastor of the Inmaculada Concepción of Almodóvar del Río (2002-2004); parish priest of Santo Domingo de Guzmán of Lucena (2004-2007); episcopal vicar of La Campiña (2004-2007); canon penitentiary (2005-2007); Professor of Sacred Liturgy, of Theology of the Sacraments, of Music and Liturgical Chant from 1994 to 1997 and of Moral Theology and Bioethics in the San Pelagio Major Seminary from 2002 to 2008.

== Bishop and archbishop ==
Pope Benedict XVI appointed Iceta titular bishop of Álava and auxiliary of Bilbao on 5 February 2008. He received his episcopal consecration on the following 12 April. On 24 August 2010, Pope Benedict named him bishop of Bilbao. The Spanish Episcopal Conference elected him a delegate to the Synod on the Family in October 2015. He was chosen to deliver the homily at the opening of the Synod's assembly on 24 October. He offered a meditation on prayer and evangelical humility. On 6 October 2020, Pope Francis appointed him archbishop of Burgos. He was installed there on 5 December.

Catholic Church titles
Preceded by Ricardo Blázquez Pérez	Bishop of Bilbao; 2010–present	Incumbent
