= Luis Argüello (bishop) =

Spanish archbishop

- Archbishop of Valladolid
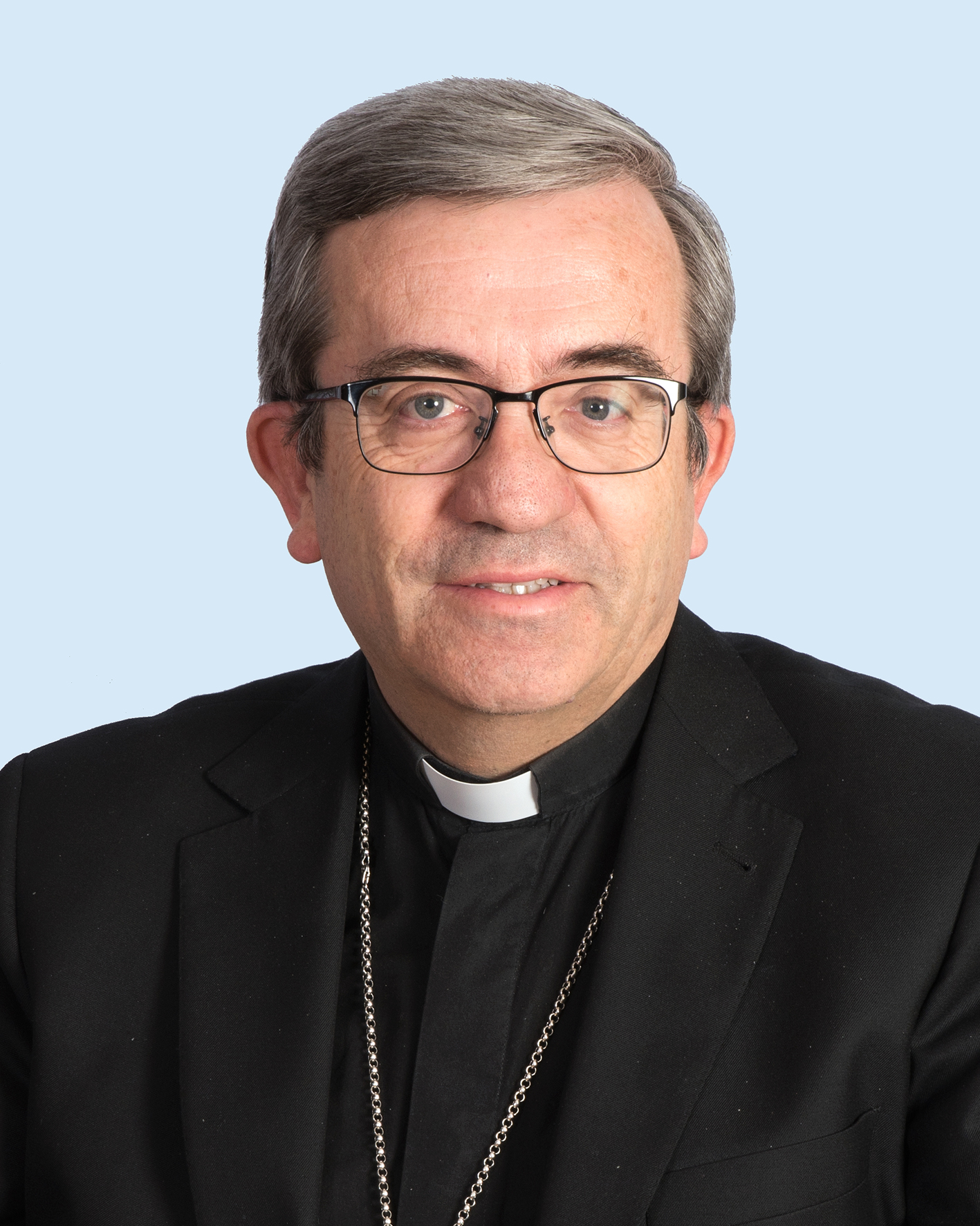
- Church: Catholic Church
- Archdiocese: Valladolid
- Installed: 30 July 2022
- Predecessor: Ricardo Blázquez

Orders
- Ordination: 27 August 1986 by José Delicado Baeza
- Consecration: 4 June 2016 by Ricardo Blázquez

Personal details
- Born: Luis Javier Argüello García; 16 May 1953 (age 73) Meneses de Campos, Province of Palencia, Spain
- Education: University of Valladolid
- Motto: Veni lumen cordium (Come, light of hearts)
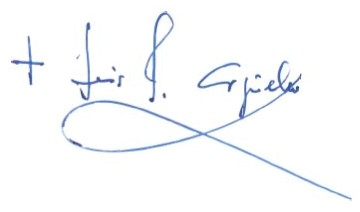
- Signature

- Coat of arms

Luis Javier Argüello García (born 16 May 1953) is a Spanish prelate of the Catholic Church. He was named archbishop of Valladolid in 2022 and president of the Spanish Episcopal Conference in 2024.

== Biography ==
Born in Meneses de Campos in the Province of Palencia, Argüello was sent to Valladolid at age 11 to study at a Salesian school. He enrolled at the University of Valladolid in 1971 to study administrative law, and joined anti-Francoist protests. When Francisco Franco closed the university in 1975, Argüello travelled with the Communist Party of Spain to meet with other student groups. In 1983, he was arrested in a protest against Spain's admission to NATO.

Argüello was ordained in 1986. From 1986 to 1997 he was a teacher at the seminary, then its rector until 2011. On 14 April 2016, Pope Francis named him auxiliary bishop of the Archdiocese of Valladolid and titular bishop of Ipagro. On 3 June, he was ordained as a bishop by archbishop-cardinal Ricardo Blázquez.

On 17 June 2022, Blázquez stepped down due to age and Pope Francis named Argüello his successor as archbishop of Valladolid. Twelve days later at St. Peter's Basilica, the pope gave him the archbishop's pallium. On 30 July, the ceremony was held at Valladolid Cathedral to make him the diocese's 41st bishop since its constitution in 1596.

Argüello was elected secretary-general of the Spanish Episcopal Conference, representing the country's Catholic bishops, in 2018. On 4 March 2024, with 48 out of 78 votes, he was voted president of the organisation for the next four-year term, succeeding cardinal-archbishop of Barcelona Juan José Omella, who could not continue due to age.

In March 2026, the Catholic Church in Spain and the government reached an agreement for compensation for victims of church sexual abuse whose abusers were deceased or the crimes too long ago to prosecute. The Associated Press described the church-state partnership as unusual.

== Views ==
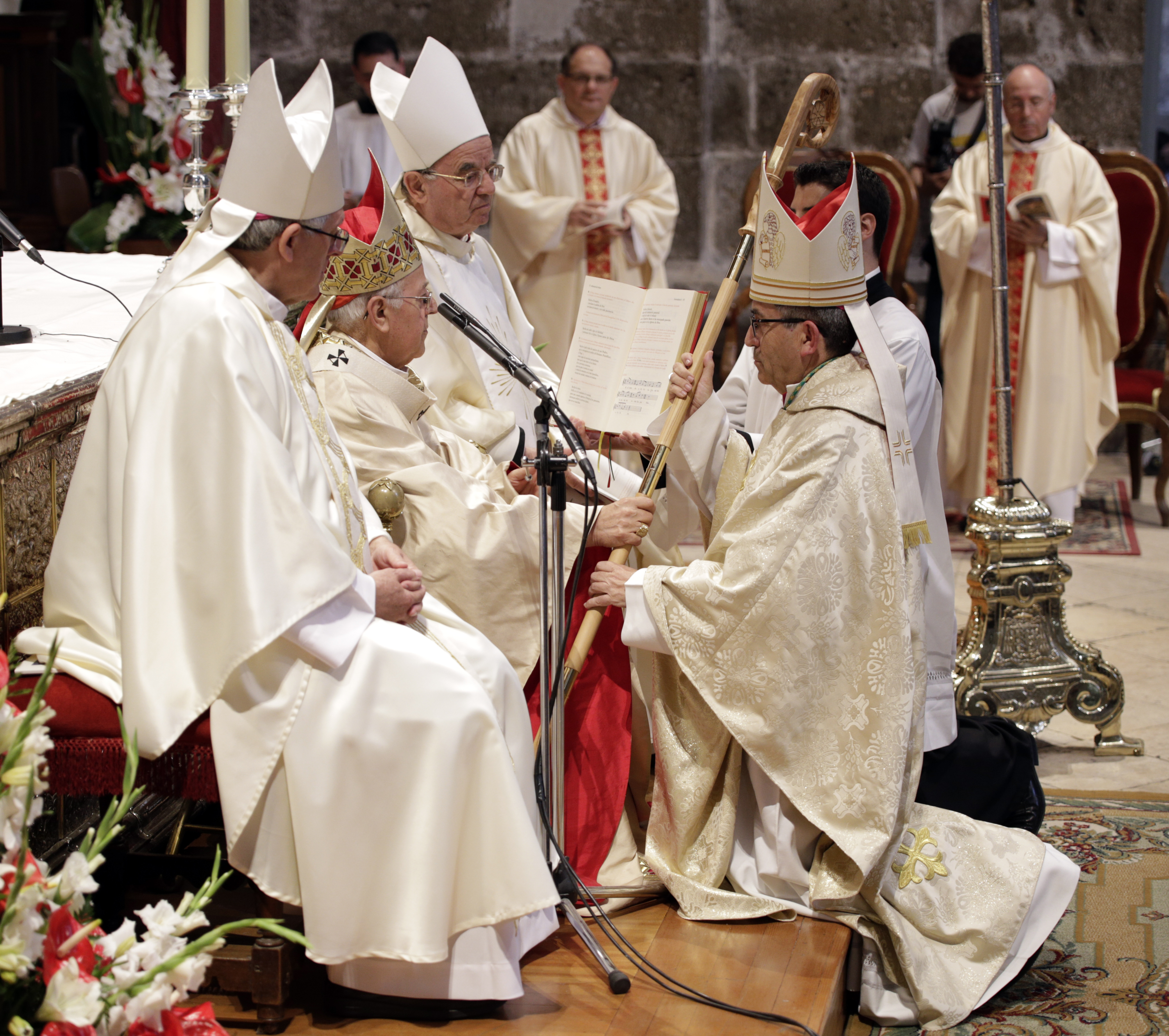
Ordination of Argüello (kneeling) as auxiliary bishop of Valladolid in 2016

=== LGBT ===
In 2018, Argüello said that all seminary students must be "males, therefore heterosexuals". He then apologised for insinuating that gay men are not male.

Argüello said in October 2022 that Spain's Ley Trans on transgender rights was "absurd" because it "depathologised" being transgender. He considered the law to be dangerous to children.

In January 2025, in dialogue with Minister of Equality Ana Redondo, Argüello said that a project called "Transformados" which was reported to be conversion therapy for homosexuals was material calling for any people to convert to Christianity. Regarding reports of married gay people being prohibited from taking communion, Argüello told Redondo that all Catholics in a state of grace could take communion, regardless of sexual orientation.

=== Freedom of religion ===
At the start of 2025, Argüello took issue with publicly funded Televisión Española broadcasting an image of the Sacred Heart with a cartoon bull's head over Jesus's head. He said that freedom of expression was not an acceptable excuse to insult religious beliefs.

Later that year, Argüello opposed a People's Party motion in Jumilla to ban non-sporting activities in municipal sports centres. The decision had been made after such centres had hosted Muslim events. Argüello then called for reciprocity and for Muslims to defend Christians' rights.

=== Politics ===
In December 2025, Argüello called for a snap election or motion of no confidence due to prime minister Pedro Sánchez from the Spanish Socialist Workers' Party (PSOE) not having support for his budget plans. Sánchez responded "The time when bishops interfered in politics ended when democracy began in this country", and he accused the clergy of not having the same position on occasions when right-wing parties were in the same predicament.

=== Immigration ===
In January 2026, Argüello supported a PSOE-led amnesty of the country's estimated 500,000 undocumented migrants.

=== Abortion and euthanasia ===
Argüello criticised a draft law in 2022 that would allow girls to have abortions without parental consent and disqualify medical staff who objected. In November 2025, he called it a "tragedy" that there were 100,000 abortions in Spain each year and 73 million worldwide.

Argüello opposed the euthanasia of paraplegic patient Noelia Castillo in March 2026, saying that doctors cannot carry out a death sentence.
