= Francisco Gil Hellín =

Spanish Roman Catholic prelate (1940–2025)

- Archbishop Emeritus of Burgos
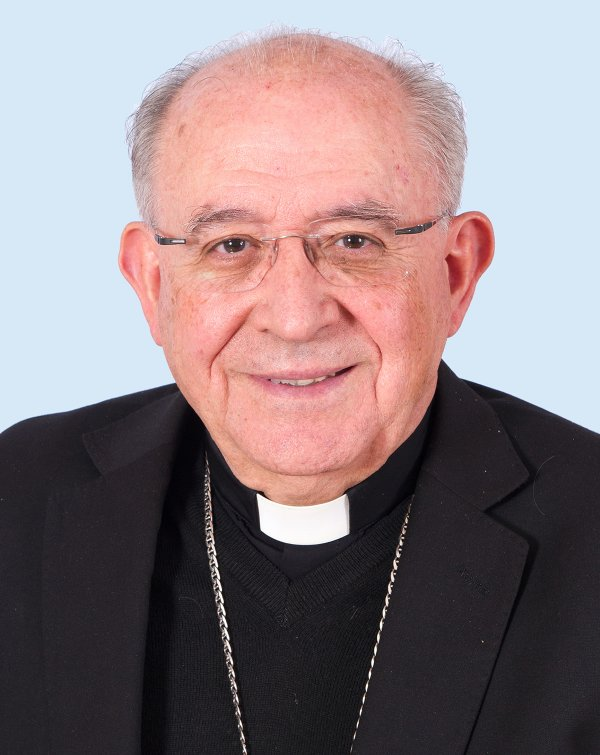
- Gil Hellín in 2016
- Archdiocese: Burgos
- Diocese: Cuidad Rodrigo
- Appointed: 28 March 2002
- Term ended: 30 October 2015
- Predecessor: Santiago Martínez Acebes
- Successor: Fidel Herráez
- Previous posts: Titular Bishop of Citium (1996–2002); Secretary of the Pontifical Council for the Family (1996–2002); Apostolic Administrator of Cuidad Rodrigo (2018–2019)

Orders
- Ordination: 21 June 1964
- Consecration: 1 June 1996 by Alfonso López Trujillo

Personal details
- Born: 2 July 1940 Murcia, Spain
- Died: 27 November 2025 (aged 85) Murcia, Spain
- Motto: In aeternum misericordia eius
- Coat of arms

Styles of Francisco Gil Hellín
- Reference style: His Excellency; The Most Reverend
- Spoken style: Your Excellency
- Religious style: Archbishop

Francisco Gil Hellín (2 July 1940 – 27 November 2025) was a Spanish Roman Catholic prelate. He served as the archbishop of the Roman Catholic Archdiocese of Burgos from 2002 to 2015.

Gil Hellín died in Murcia on 27 November 2025, at the age of 85.

Catholic Church titles
Preceded by Santiago Martínez Acebes	Archbishop of Burgos; 2002–2015	Succeeded by Fidel Herráez
Preceded by Paul E. Waldschmidt	Titular Bishop of Citium; 1996–2002	Succeeded by Oscar Omar Aparicio Céspedes
