= Diocese of Bilbao =

Roman Catholic diocese in Spain

Coordinates: 43.2569°N 2.9239°W

Diocese of Bilbao Dioecesis Flaviobrigensis Diócesis de Bilbao (es) Bilboko elizbarrutia (eu)

Catholic
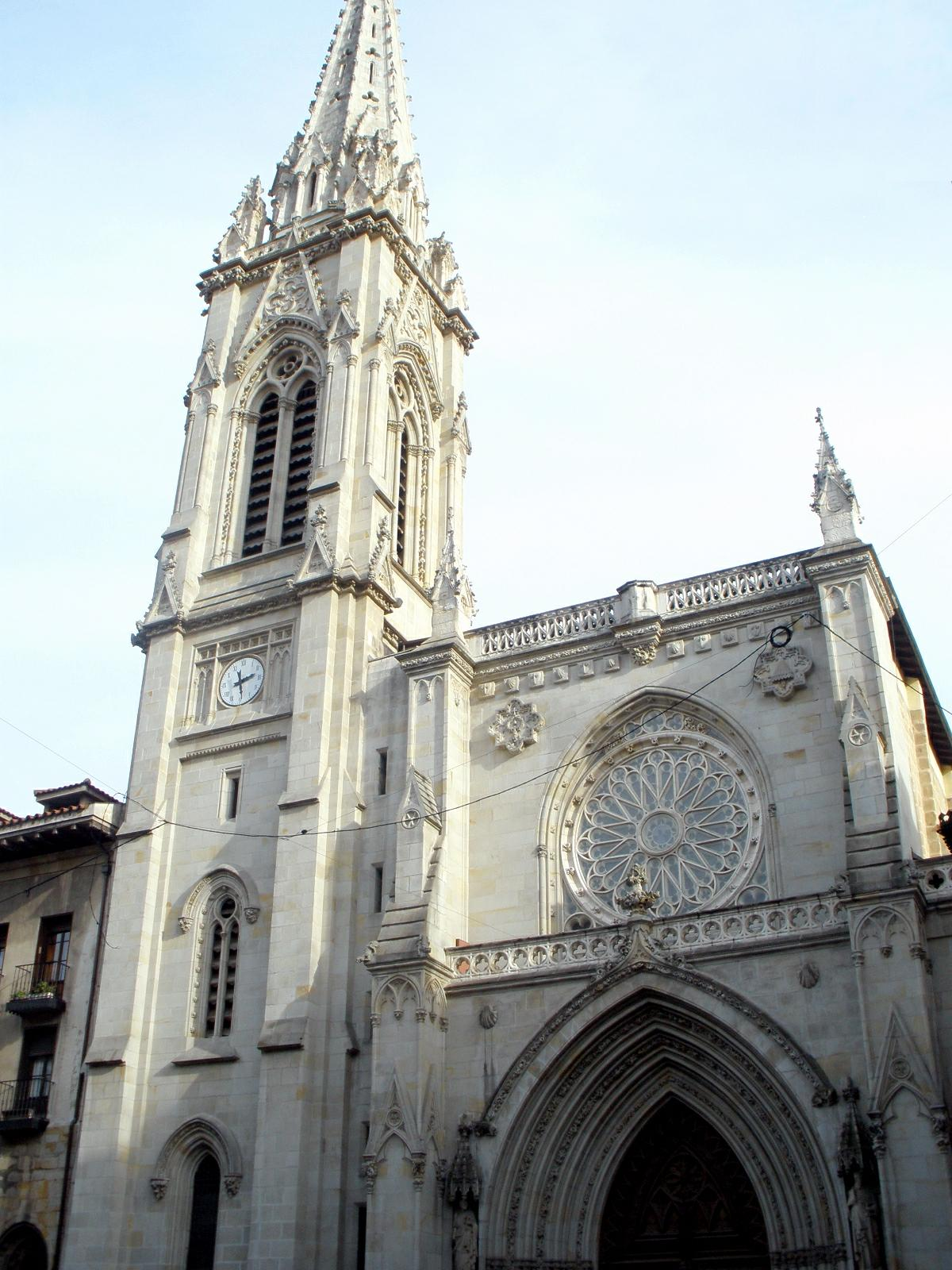
- Bilbao Cathedral

Location
- Country: Spain
- Ecclesiastical province: Burgos
- Metropolitan: Burgos

Statistics
- Area: 2,193 km^{2} (847 sq mi)
- Population: Total; Catholics: (as of 2012); 1,172,900; 1,146,400 (97.7%)

Information
- Rite: Latin Rite
- Cathedral: Cathedral of St James in Bilbao

Current leadership
- Pope: Leo XIV
- Bishop: Joseba Segura Etxezarraga
- Metropolitan Archbishop: Mario Iceta Gavicagogeascoa

Map
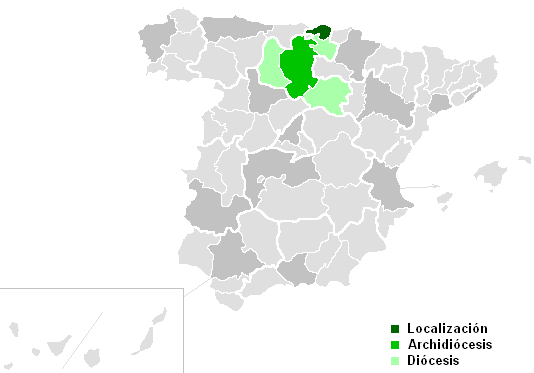

Website
- Website of the Diocese

The Diocese of Bilbao (Latin: Dioecesis Flaviobrigensis) is a Latin Church diocese of the Catholic Church located in the city of Bilbao and Province of Biscay in Northern Spain. It is part of the ecclesiastical province of Burgos.

== History ==
- November 2, 1949: Established as Diocese of Bilbao from the dioceses of Vitoria and Santander.

== Territory ==
The Diocese of Bilbao covers all the territory of Biscay, except the exclave of Orduña (between Alava and Burgos), and including the tiny enclave of Valle de Villaverde (Cantabria). The diocese is divided in seven territorial vicarages:

1. Encartaciones Bajas
2. Encartaciones Altas
3. Bilbao-Abando
4. Durango-Arratia
5. Gernikaldea
6. Bilbao-Begoña

== Bishops of Bilbao ==
- Casimiro Morcillo González (13 May 1950 – 21 September 1955); transferred to Zaragoza
- Pablo Gúrpide Beope (19 December 1955 – 18 November 1968), died in office
- Antonio Añoveros Ataún (3 December 1971 – 25 September 1978), renounced
- Luis María de Larrea y Legarreta (16 February 1979 – 8 August 1995), renounced
- Ricardo Blázquez Pérez (8 September 1995 – 15 March 2010); transferred to Valladolid (Cardinal in 2015)
- Mario Iceta Gavicagogeascoa (11 October 2010 – 5 December 2020)
- Joseba Segura Etxezarraga (11 May 2021 – present)

== Special churches ==
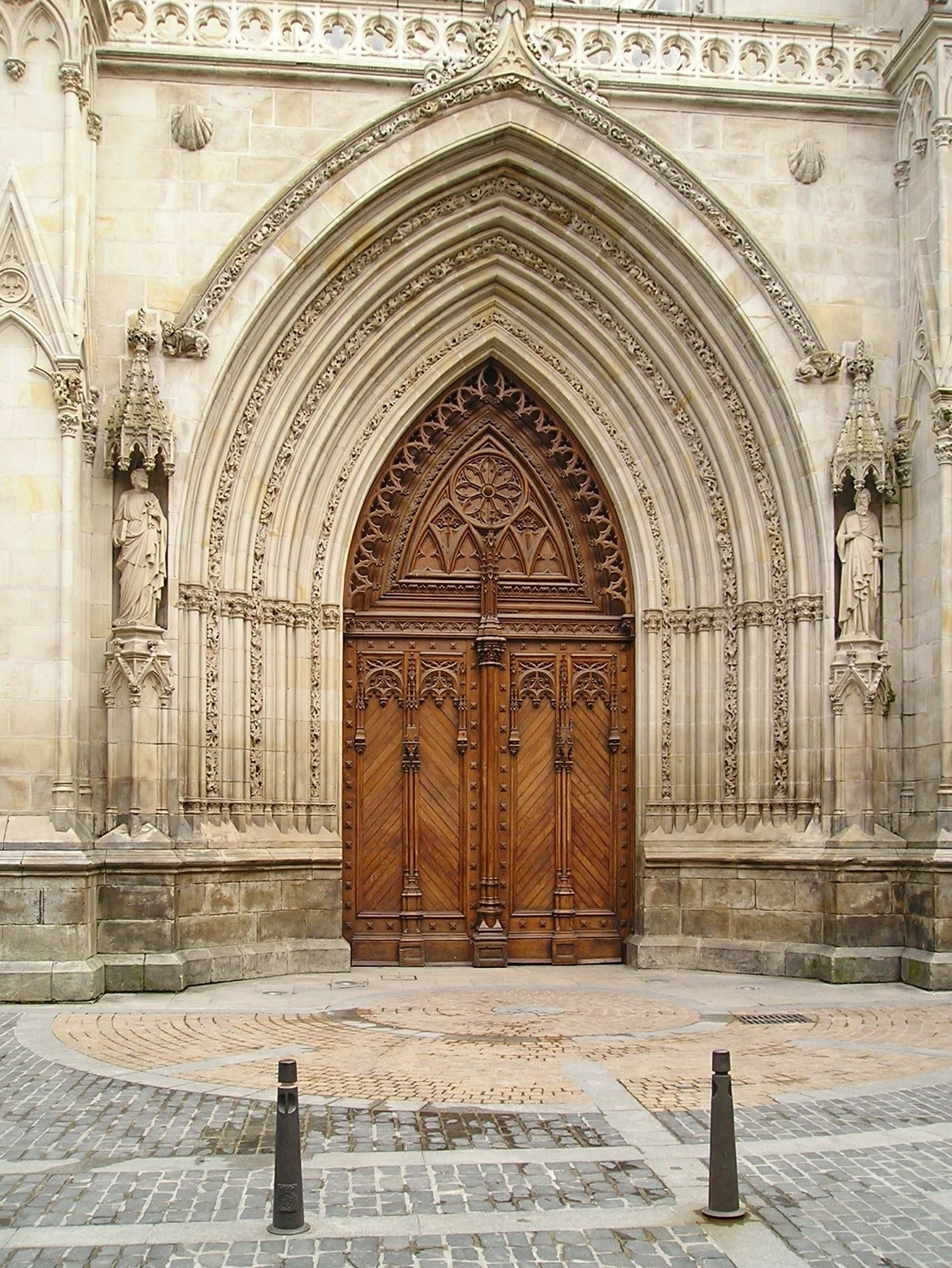
Bilbao's Cathedral of Santiago.

- Minor Basilicas:
  - Basílica de la Asunción de Nuestra Señora/Andra Mariaren Zeruratzea, Lekeitio, Vizcaya, País Vasco
  - Basílica de la Purísima Concepción (Sortzez Garbia), Elorrio, Vizcaya, País Vasco
  - Basílica de Nuestra Señora de Begoña/Begoñako Andra Mari, Begoña, Vizcaya, País Vasco
  - Santa María de Portugalete/Nazareteko Andra Mari, Portugalete, Vizcaya, País Vasco
  - Santa María de Uribarri/Uribarriko Andra Mari, Durango, Vizcaya, País Vasco

=== Basílica de la Asunción de Nuestra Señora ===
==== History ====
The church was consecrated in Lekeitio in 1287, and was recorded as under construction in 1374. A century later, in 1487, it was all but ready for use. The neo-Gothic retrochoir by architect Casto de Zavala was added between 1881 and 1884, thanks to benefactor Pascual Abaroa

==== Building ====
The church consist of three staggered naves in four sections and a polygonal chevet at the centre, the latter surrounded by a lower retro-choir. On the main wall there is a narrow gallery, in the form of windows with sills decorated with blind tracery. The church has one of the finest triforia in all Basque Gothic Architecture. The archivolted west door is set into a façade blooming with tiny original sculptured decorations. The tower consists of an ancient shaft that rises to roof level and a more modern belfry above.

==== Furniture ====
The church is presided by a superb polychrome wood retable. The retable recounts the life of the Virgin in narrative and symbolic references.

== See also ==
- Roman Catholicism in Spain
