= Meneses de Campos =

Coordinates: 41°57′N 4°55′W

- municipality
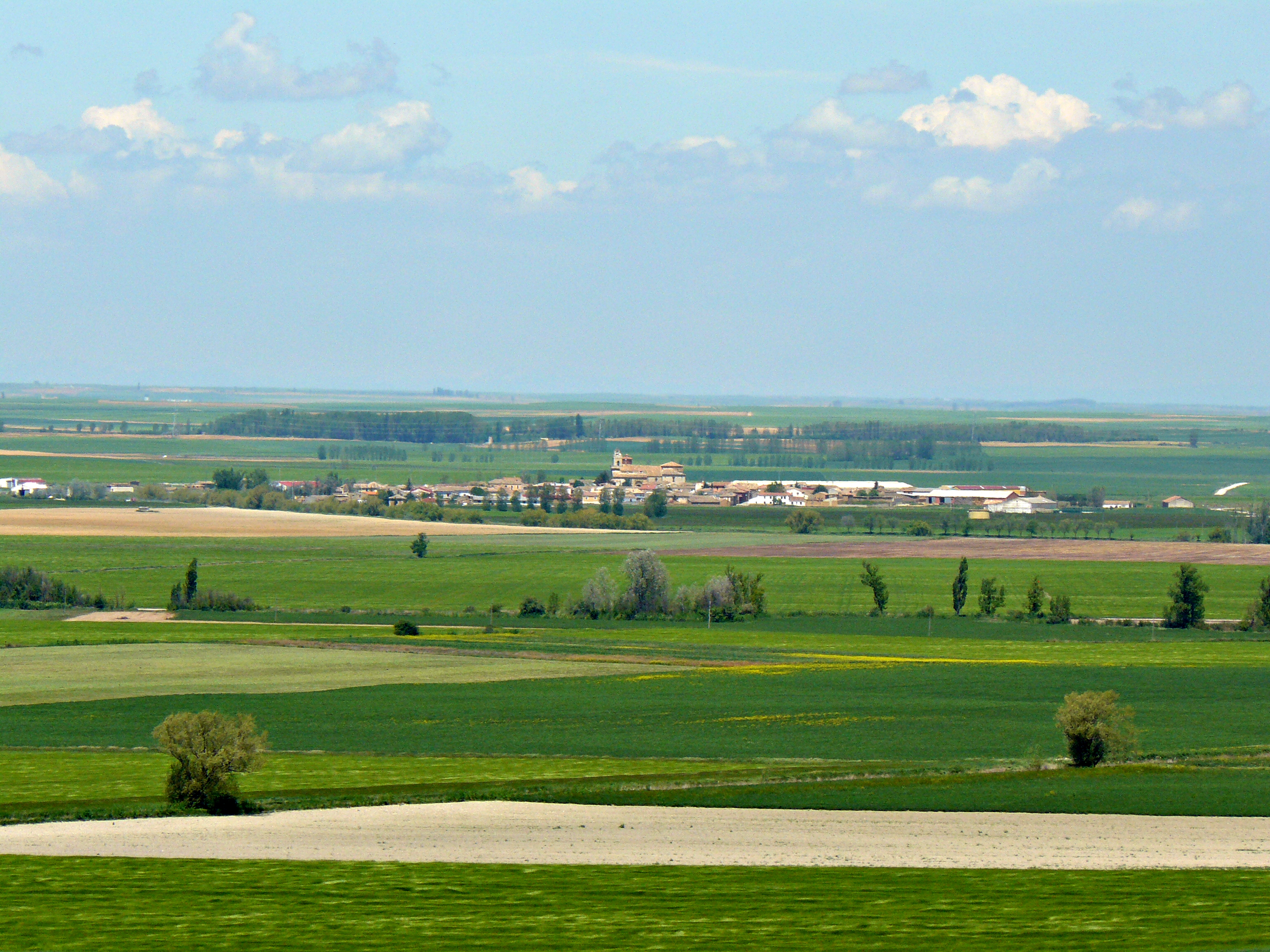
- Interactive map of Meneses de Campos
- Country: Spain
- Autonomous community: Castile and León
- Province: Palencia
- Municipality: Meneses de Campos

Area
  - Total: 28 km^{2} (11 sq mi)

Population (2025-01-01)
  - Total: 109
  - Density: 3.9/km^{2} (10/sq mi)
- Time zone: UTC+1 (CET)
  - Summer (DST): UTC+2 (CEST)
- Website: Official website

Meneses de Campos is a municipality located in the province of Palencia, Castile and León, Spain. According to the 2004 census (INE), the municipality has a population of 142 inhabitants.

== Notable people ==
- Luis Argüello (born 1953), archbishop of Valladolid and president of the Spanish Episcopal Conference
