= Luis María de Larrea y Legarreta =

- Bishop of Diocese of Bilbao (Emeritus)
- Church: Roman Catholic Church
- See: Diocese of Bilbao
- In office: 1979–1995
- Predecessor: Antonio Añoveros Ataún
- Successor: Ricardo Blázquez Pérez
- Previous post: Priest

Orders
- Ordination: 27 June 1943
- Consecration: 25 September 1971

Personal details
- Born: 19 April 1918 Miravalles, Spain
- Died: 28 May 2009 (aged 91)

Luis María de Larrea y Legarreta (19 April 1918 – 28 May 2009) was a Spanish Bishop of the Roman Catholic Church. At the age of 91, he was one of the oldest bishops in the Church.

Luis María de Larrea y Legarreta was born in Miravalles, Spain, and was ordained as a priest on 27 June 1943. He was appointed Bishop of the Diocese of León on 9 July 1971, and was ordained on 25 September 1971. On 16 February 1979 Legarreta was appointed to the Diocese of Bilbao, where he remained until his retirement on 8 September 1995.
