= Centola and Helen =

Christian saints and martyrs

Saints Centola and Helen
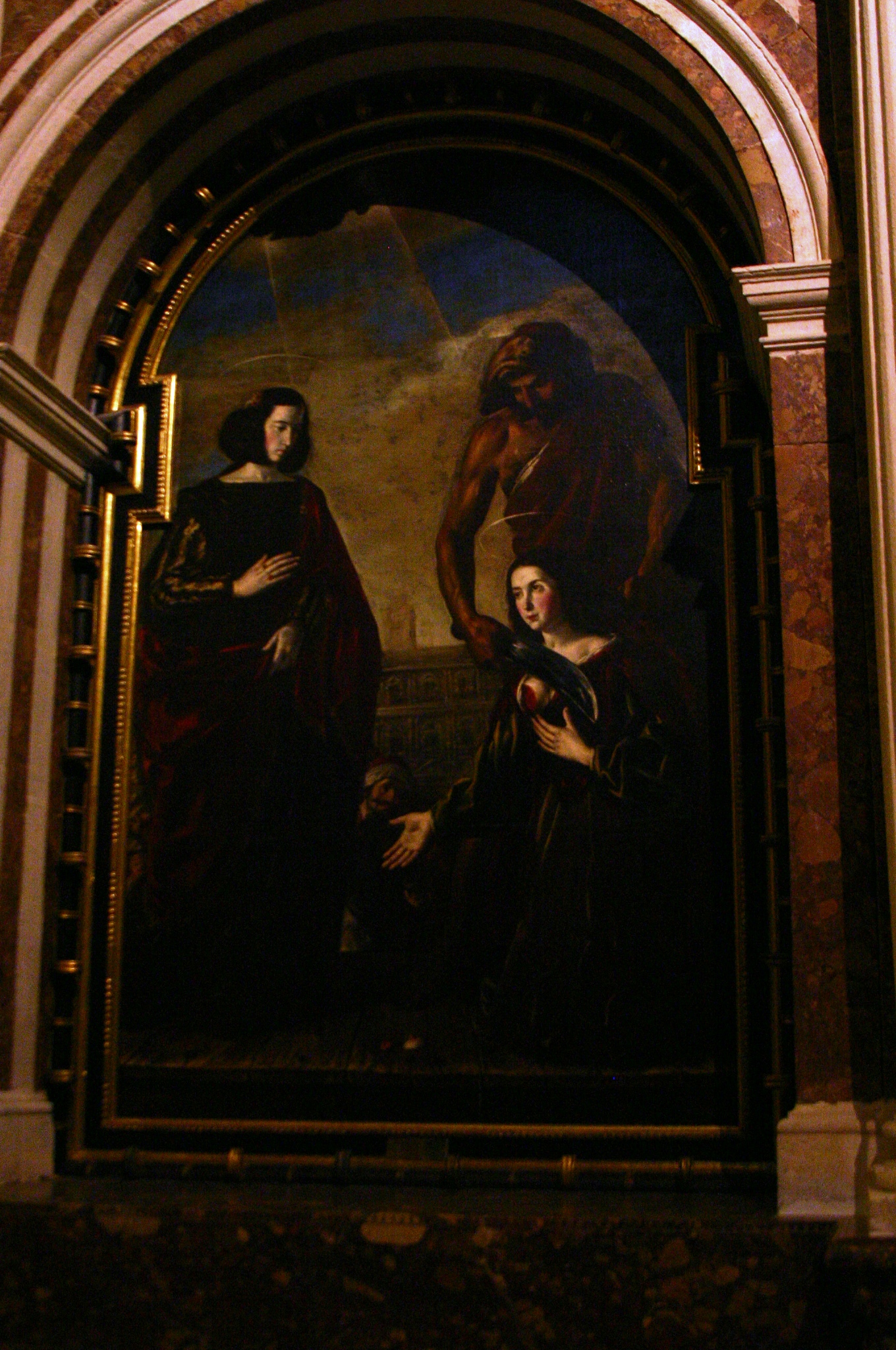
- Martyrdom of Saints Centola and Helen. Burgos Cathedral.

Martyrs
- Died: ~304 AD; Burgos, Spain
- Venerated in: Catholic Church, Eastern Orthodox Church
- Feast: 13 August (Burgos Cathedral)

Saints Centola and Helen (Spanish: Santa Centola y Santa Elena) were, according to Christian tradition, two women who were martyred at Burgos in 304 AD during the persecution of Christians by Diocletian.

== Veneration ==
Their cult remained localized in the Burgos region. A late Visigothic hermitage dedicated to the two saints can be found at Valdelateja, and there is a church dedicated to them at Villafranca Montes de Oca by Rodrigo de la Haya.
