= Archdiocese of Burgos =

Roman Catholic Metropolitan Archdiocese in Spain

Archdiocese of Burgos Archidioecesis Burgensis Archidiócesis de Burgos

Catholic
- Burgos Cathedral

Location
- Country: Spain
- Ecclesiastical province: Burgos
- Coordinates: 42.33915°N 3.70673°W

Statistics
- Area: 13,849 km^{2} (5,347 sq mi)
- Population: Total; Catholics: (as of 2012); 375,563; 339,185 (90.3%)
- Parishes: 1003

Information
- Denomination: Roman Catholic
- Rite: Roman Rite
- Established: 1075 (As Diocese of Burgos); 22 October 1574 (As Archdiocese of Burgos)
- Cathedral: Cathedral of St Mary in Burgos

Current leadership
- Pope: Leo XIV
- Metropolitan Archbishop: Mario Iceta Gavicagogeascoa
- Suffragans: Diocese of Bilbao; Diocese of Osma-Soria; Diocese of Palencia; Diocese of Vitoria
- Bishops emeritus: Fidel Herráez Vegas; Francisco Gil Hellín

Map
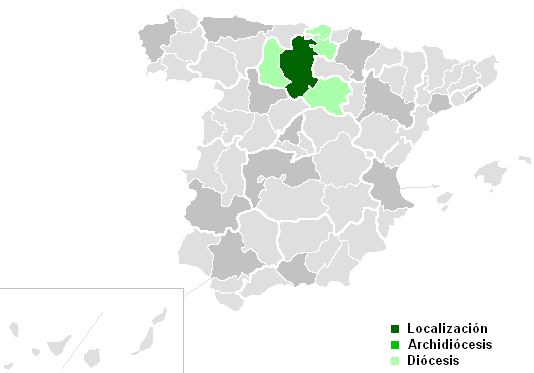

Website
- Website of the Archdiocese

The Archdiocese of Burgos (Latin: Archidioecesis Burgensis) is Latin Metropolitan sees of the Catholic Church in Spain.

Its ecclesiastical province includes four suffragan dioceses:

- Bilbao
- Osma–Soria
- Palencia
- Vitoria

== Extent and flock ==
The archdiocese comprises since the Concordat of 1851 almost the entire Burgos province. Its area is approximately 8,694 square miles (22,520 km^{2}), with a population in the early 20th century of 340,000, divided into 1220 parishes which form forty-seven vicariates. By 2006, the number of parishes had declined to 1001.

In 2006, the Archdiocese of Burgos had 339,360 Catholics. This meant that 94% of the population was Catholic in the area. However, since the Catholic Church records people who have been baptized as members, and only with the rare occurrence of excommunication are people normally removed from the records, this figure probably includes many people who not only do not attend Catholic services but may have actually been baptized in and currently attending Protestant, Latter-day Saint or Muslim services.

The diocese had 589 Catholics per priest, which although it was higher than the 439 Catholics per priest that there had been in 1978 it was much lower than the 655 Catholics per priest in the Diocese back in 1950.

== Geography ==
The northern and eastern portion of the diocese is mountainous, thickly wooded, and traversed by rivers, among which is the Ebro, which rises in the mountains and serves as the eastern boundary for Miranda de Ebro. The Arlanza which crosses the diocese from east to west flows by Salas de los Infantes, near the famous monastery of Santo Domingo de Silos, and through the center of the well-known town of Lerma.

The mountainous region is unproductive of cereals, but fruits grow in abundance, and fine pasture-lands sustain great herds of cows and sheep, which furnish excellent meat and milk. Delicate cheeses which take their name from the city and are famous throughout Spain, are made in this section. Minerals are abundant, especially sulphate of soda, common salt, iron, and hard coal. The southern part of the diocese, especially the valley and plains, is fertile and produces abundantly vegetables, cereals, and quite a quantity of wind. The climate, cold but healthy, is damp towards the north. Although this section has few industries, the transportation of its fruit and minerals is greatly facilitated by the numerous highways and by the railroad between Madrid and France which crosses the eastern side of the diocese from south to north. There are also some secondary railway lines for the operation of the mines.

== History ==
Burgos has been since 800 AD an episcopal see of Spain, into which in the 1087 the territory of the suppressed Roman Catholic Diocese of Valpuesta (a suffragan of the primatial Metropolitan of Tarragona; later the titular see of Valliposita) was merged.

In 1574 Pope Gregory XIII raised it to metropolitan rank, at the request of King Philip II of Spain.

=== Councils in Burgos ===
Some important councils have been held in Burgos. A national council took place there in 1078, although opinions differ as to date (the "Boletín de la Academia de la Historia de Madrid", 1906, XLIX, 337, says 1080). This was presided over by the papal delegate, Cardinal Roberto, and attended by King Alfonso VI of Castile. It was convoked for the purpose of introducing into Spain the Roman Rite form of liturgy with the Roman Breviary and Sacramentary, in place of the Mozarabic Rite then in use (which now survives only in Toledo).

Another national council, presided over by Cardinal Boso (d. 1181), also papal delegate, settled questions of discipline and established diocesan rights and limits. The proceedings of this council remained unpublished until quite recently, when they were made known in the Boletín already mentioned (XLVIII) 395).

In 1898, a provincial council was called by Archbishop (not Cardinal) Don Gregorio Aguirre, in which the obligations of the clergy and the faithful were most minutely set forth.

== (Archi)Episcopal incumbents ==
=== Bishops of Burgos (1075–1574) ===
1. 1075–1082 : Simeón (or Simón)
2. 1082–1096 : Gómez
3. 1097–1114 : García Aznárez
4. 1114–1118 : Pascual
5. 1119–1146 : Ramiro (intruso)
6. 1147–1156 : Víctor
7. 1156–1181 : Pedro Pérez
8. 1181–1200 : Marino Maté
9. 1200–1205 : Mateo I
10. 1206–1211 : García Martínez de Contreras
11. 1211–1212 : Juan Maté
12. 1213–1238 : Mauricio
13. 1240–1246 : Juan Domínguez de Medina, Died
14. 1246–1257 : Aparicio
15. 1257–1259 : Mateo II Rinal
16. 1260–1267 : Martín González
17. 1268–1269 : Juan de Villahoz, Died
18. 1275–1280 : Gonzalo Pérez Gudiel, Appointed, Archbishop of Toledo; future Cardinal
19. 1280–1299 : Fernando Covarrubias, Died
20. 1300–1302 : Pedro Rodríguez, Appointed, Cardinal-Bishop of Sabina
21. 1303–1313 : Pedro Rodríguez Quijada?
22. 1313–1327 : Gonzalo Osorio Villalobos
23. 1327–1348 : García de Torres Sotoscueva
24. 1348–13 . . : Pedro
25. 1351–13 . . : Lope de Fontecha
26. 1352–13 . . : Juan Sánchez de las Roelas
27. 1361–13 . . : Juan
28. 1362–1365 : Fernando de Vargas
29. 1366–1380 : Domingo de Arroyuelo
30. 1381–1382 : Juan García Manrique
31. 1382–1394 : Gonzalo Mena Roelas, Appointed, Archbishop of Sevilla
32. 1394–1406 : Juan de Villacreces
33. 1407–1413 : Juan Cabeza de Vaca.
34. 1413–1414 : Alfonso de Illescas
35. 1415–1435 : Pablo de Santa María
36. 1435–1456 : Alfonso de Cartagena
37. 1456–1495 : Luis de Acuña y Osorio
38. 1495–1512 : Pascual Rebenga de Ampudia, Died — (or 1496–1512)
39. 1512–1514 : (Cardinal) Jaime Serra i Cau, Appointed, Administrator of Calahorra y La Calzada
40. 15 . .–1514 : Ortega Gomiel
41. 1514–1524 : Juan Rodríguez de Fonseca, Died
42. 1525–1527 : Antonio de Rojas Manrique, Died
43. 1529–1537 : Íñigo López de Mendoza y Zúñiga, Died (Cardinal in 1531)
44. 1537–1550 : Juan Álvarez de Toledo, Appointed, Archbishop of Santiago de Compostela) (Cardinal in 1538)
45. 1550–1566 : (Cardinal) Francisco Mendoza de Bobadilla, Died
46. 1567–1574 : (Cardinal) Francisco Pacheco de Toledo; see below

=== Archbishops of Burgos (from 1574) ===
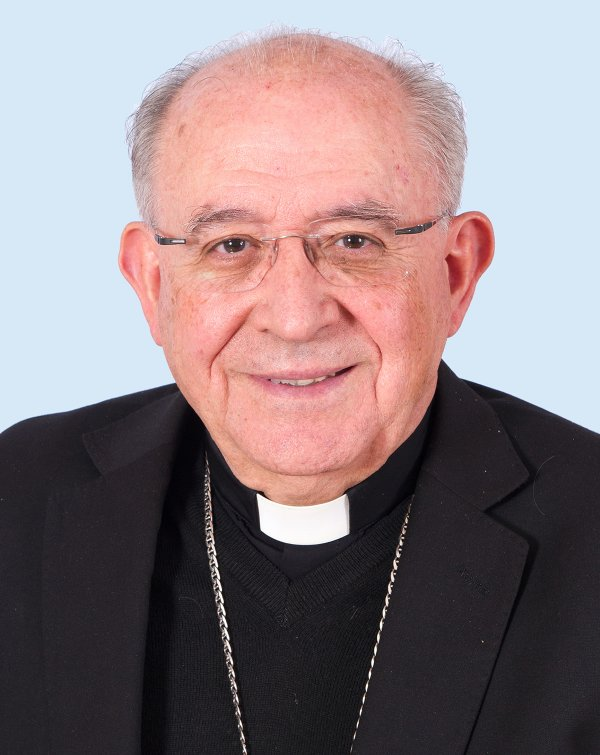
Archbishop Francisco Gil Hellín

In 1574, the see of Burgos was raised to the status of an archbishopric by Pope Gregory XIII.

1. 1574–1579 : (Cardinal) Francisco Pacheco de Toledo, Died; see above
2. 1580–1599 : Cristóbal Vela Tavera, Died
3. 1600–1604 : Antonio Zapata y Cisneros, Resigned (elevated to Cardinal in 1605)
4. 1604–1612 : Alfonso Manrique, Died
5. 1613–1629 : Fernando de Acevedo González, Died
6. 1630–1631 : José González Díez, (José González de Villalobos) Died
7. 1631–1640 : Fernando Andrade Sotomayor, Appointed Archbishop (Personal Title) of Sigüenza
8. 1640–1655 : Francisco de Manso Zuñiga y Sola, Died
9. . . . . .1657 : Juan Pérez Delgado
10. 1658–1663 : Antonio Payno Osorio, Appointed, Archbishop of Seville
11. 1663–1664 : Diego de Tejada y la Guardia
12. 1665–1679 : Enrique de Peralta y Cárdenas
13. 1680–1701 : Juan de Isla
14. . . . . .1702 : (Cardinal) Francisco Antonio de Borja-Centelles y Ponce de Léon
15. 1703–1704 : Fernando Manuel de Mejía
16. 1705–1723 : Manuel Francisco Navarrete
17. 1724–1728 : Lucas Conejero de Molina
18. 1728–1741 : Manuel de Samaniego y Jaca
19. 1741–1744 : Diego Felipe de Perea y Magdaleno
20. 1744–1750 : Pedro de la Cuadra y Achica
21. 1751–1757 : Juan Francisco Guillén Isso
22. 1757–1761 : Onésimo de Salamanca y Zaldívar
23. 1761–1764 : Francisco Díaz Santos del Bullón
24. 1764–1791 : José Javier Rodríguez de Arellano
25. 1791–1797 : Juan Antonio de los Tucros
26. 1797–1801 : Ramón José de Arce
  - 1801 : Juan Antonio López Cabrejas (electo)
27. 1802–1822 : Manuel Cid y Monroy
28. 1824 : Rafael de Vélez, OFM Cap, Appointed, Archbishop of Santiago de Compostela
29. 1825–1829 : Alonso Cañedo Vigil
30. 1830–1832 : Joaquín López y Sicilia, Appointed, Archbishop of Valencia
31. 1832–1840 : Ignacio Rives y Mayor
  - 1845–1847 : Severo Leonardo Andriani y Escofet (Administrador Apostólico)
32. 1847–1848 : Ramón Montero
33. 1849–1857 : Cirilo Alameda y Brea, OFM Obs, Appointed, Archbishop of Toledo (Cardinal in 1858)
34. 1857–1867 : Fernando de la Puente y Primo de Rivera (Cardinal in 1862)
35. 1867–1882 : Anastasio Rodrigo Yusto
36. 1883–1886 : Saturnino Fernández de Castro y de la Cotera
37. 1886–1893 : Manuel Gómez Salazar y Lucio Villegas
38. 1894–1909 : Gregorio Maria Aguirre y Garcia, OFM Disc (Cardinal in 1907)
39. 1909–1912 : Benito Murúa López
40. 1913–1918 : José Cadena y Eleta
41. 1919–1926 : Juan Benlloch i Vivó (Cardinal in 1921)
42. 1926–1927 : Pedro Segura y Sáenz, Appointed, Archbishop of Toledo (Cardinal in 1927)
43. 1928–1944 : Manuel de Castro Alonso
44. 1944–1963 : Luciano Pérez Platero — (or 1945–1963)
45. 1964–1983 : Segundo García de la Sierra y Méndez (o Segundo García de Sierra y Méndez)
46. 1983–1992 : Teodoro Cardenal Fernández
47. 1992–2002 : Santiago Martínez Acebes
48. 2002–2015 : Francisco Gil Hellín
49. 2015–2020 : Fidel Herráez Vegas
50. As of 2020 : Mario Iceta Gavicagogeascoa

=== Auxiliary bishops ===
1. 1568–1579 : Gonzalo Herrera Olivares, Died
2. 1605–1610 : Alonso Orozco Enriquez de Armendáriz Castellanos y Toledo, Appointed, Bishop of Santiago de Cuba
3. 1648–1669 : Pedro Luis Manso Zuñiga, Died

== Saints ==
Saint Julian, Bishop of Cuenca, called the Almoner because of his great charity to the poor, was born in Burgos; also Saint Amaro the Pilgrim, who has always had a special cult devoted to him in Burgos, though not found in the Roman Martyrology. Two local saints were the martyrs Centola and (H)Elen(s).

Saint Iñigo (Enecus or Ignatius), abbot of Oña, while not born in Burgos, labored there for many years; also Saint Domingo de Silos, abbot and reformer of the famous monastery of Silos, and Saint John of Sahagún, a native of that town in the Province of León.

Among its saints may also be mentioned the martyrs of Cardeña, religious of the convent of the same name, who in the tenth century were executed by the Arab soldiers of the Emir of Córdoba in one of their numerous invasions of Castile; and St. Casilda, daughter of a Moorish king of Toledo, converted near Burgos whither she had gone with her father's consent to drink the water of some medicinal springs. She built a hermitage and died a saintly death.

== See also ==
- Timeline of Burgos
