= Idente Missionaries =

The Institute Id of Christ the Redeemer, Idente Missionaries, is a Catholic religious institute of consecrated life founded by Fernando Rielo in 1959 on the island of Tenerife, Spain. The congregation has religious men and women, as well as married missionaries.

== History ==
The Idente Missionaries were founded on June 29, 1959 in the Diocese of Tenerife (Canary Islands, Spain), with the support of Bishop, Domingo Pérez Cáceres. The name is derived from a combination of the Spanish word "id" and the Latin "ente" to convey the idea of the "Great Commission" {Matt.28:19) "Go and teach all nations."

In January 1994, the missionaries were canonically recognized by the Archdiocese of Madrid as a Public Association of the Faithful. In 2009, Pope Benedict XVI elevated the Idente Missionaries to the status of a religious institute of consecrated life of pontifical right.

The Institute has some ninety houses in twenty countries.

== Charism ==
The charism of the institute is a "filial consciousness" of God. This filial consciousness consists in complete receptivity to grace. It is reflected in three principles:

- a vocation to holiness;
- community life; and
- a commitment to evangelization

== Spirituality ==
The members of the Institute profess the religious vows of poverty, chastity, and obedience. There is a particular devotion to Mary, under the title "Our Lady of the Mystical Life", (honored with a chapel at Almudena Cathedral); and to St. Joseph.

== Administration and Government ==
Both the men's and the women's congregations of the Idente Missionaries each have a General Superior. The Apostolic President oversees both. The men's congregation has a Patriarch, responsible for the administration of each continent. The women's congregation has a Matriarch for administration of a continent. Provincial Superiors are responsible for administration in each Province. A province may have one or more delegations within it. A Superior administers each residence of the Idente Missionaries.

== Ministry ==
The Idente Missionaries in the Philippines is under the Roman Catholic Diocese of Novaliches.

== Foundations ==
The Idente Family is made up of lay people who share the spirit of the Institute, but do not profess vows. The Idente School is a school for theological and philosophical studies. Its headquarters is in Rome, Italy. The Idente Youth is a foundation to promote idealism among youth. The Fernando Rielo Foundation publishes books and works of the Founder. It also encourages culture and poetry. Each year, since 1981, the Foundation awards the "Fernando Rielo World Prize for Mystical Poetry

== See also ==
- List of some religious institutes (Catholic)
- Institute of consecrated life
