= Francisco de Cubas =

Spanish architect and politician

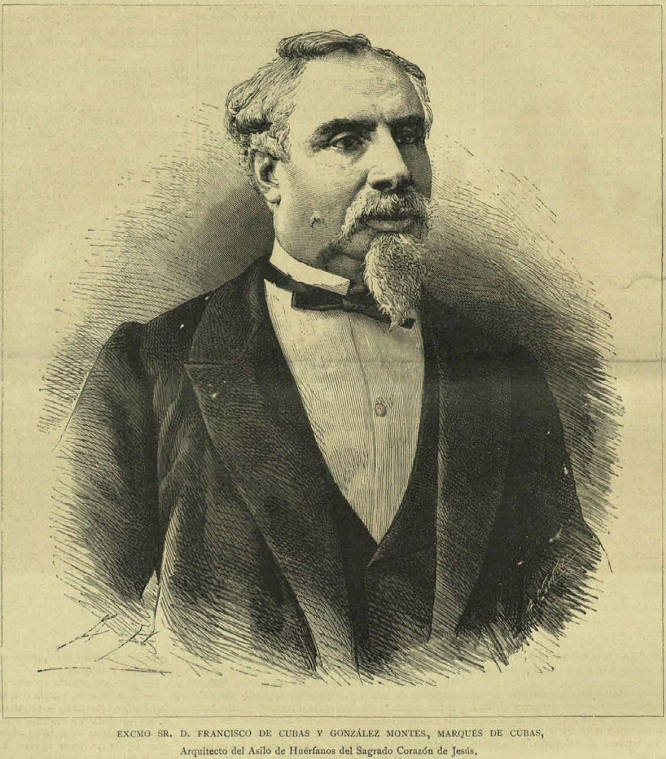
Francisco de Cubas

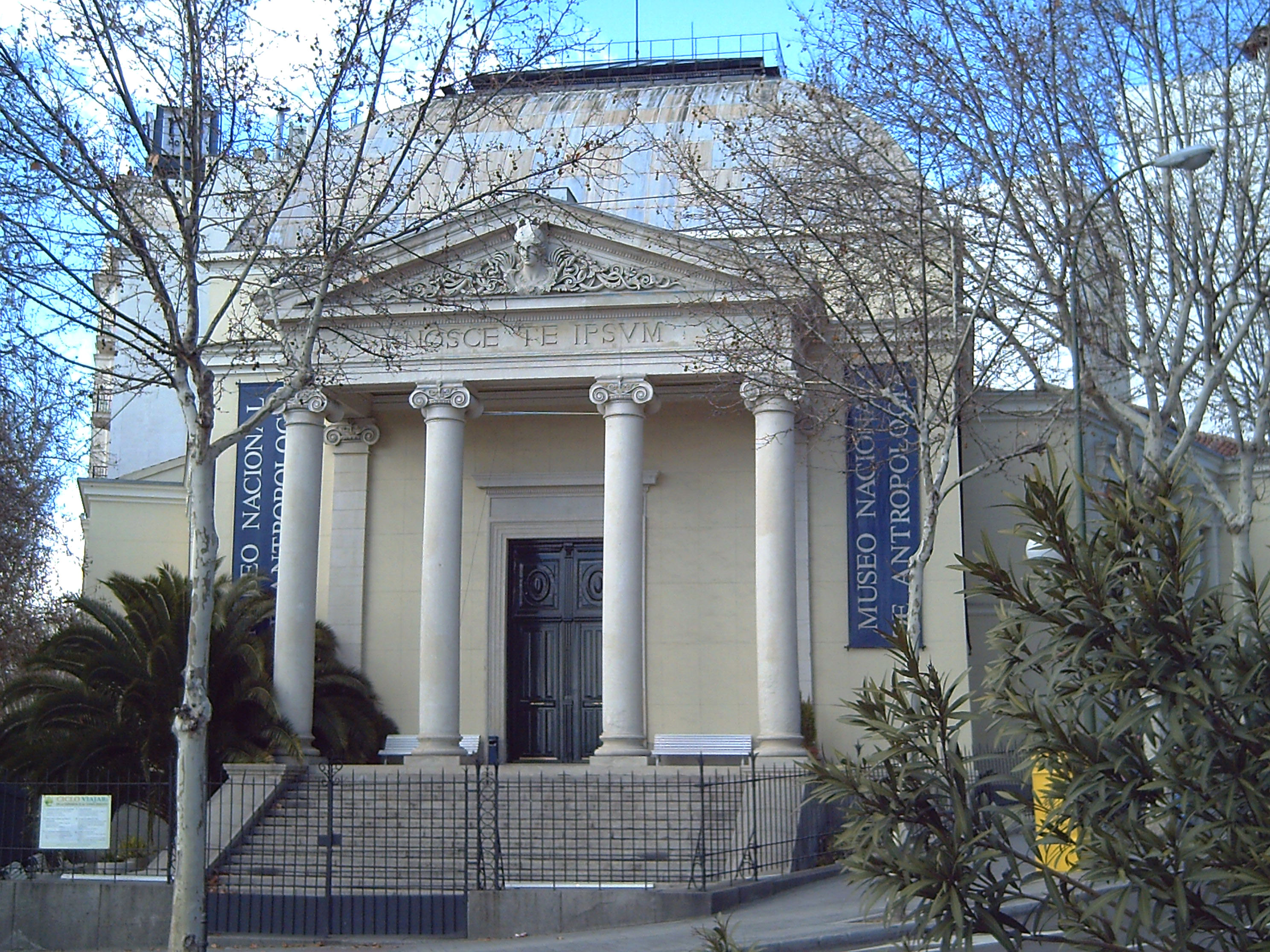
Example of a building designed by Francisco de Cubas: the National Museum of Anthropology (Museo Nacional de Antropología).

Francisco de Cubas y González-Montes (13 April 1826 – 2 January 1899) was a Spanish architect and politician. He was also known as the Marquis of Cubas (Marqués de Cubas) after his noble title, the marquisate of Cubas. He was also from 1894 the Marquis of Fontalba.

== Life ==
He was born in Madrid in 1826. He studied at the Escuela Técnica Superior de Arquitectura in Madrid and obtained scholarships that allowed him to complete his studies in Italy and Greece. Upon his return to Spain in 1858, he won a medal at the National Exposition of 1858. A member of the Royal Academy of Fine Arts of San Fernando from 1870, he worked as an architect while also pursuing a political career as a member of the Cortes Generales (as a deputy or diputado), en 1893, as the senator representing Ávila between 1896–98, and, he served as mayor of Madrid for a month (November 6, 1892 – December 1, 1892).

His work represents some of the most well-known of 19th century architecture of Madrid, and his style is noted for its use of brick and his works in the Neo-Gothic and Historicist styles. His work includes the Jesuit college known as the Colegio Nuestra Señora del Recuerdo, the University of Deusto in Bilbao, and the National Museum of Anthropology in Madrid. It also includes the Palace of Arenzana (today the French embassy) in Madrid and the Church of Santa Cruz in Madrid.

His most famous work is Almudena Cathedral, begun in 1883. The original plan had been to create a parochial church. Francisco de Cubas revised this plan, deciding instead to create an imposing Neo-Gothic cathedral, the style popular at that time, especially due to the influence of Viollet-le-Duc. This project was later modified significantly: work on the cathedral encountered delays due to economic difficulties, and later the style was modified to a Neoclassic style, in line with the nearby Palacio de Oriente (Palacio Real). More representative of Francisco de Cubas’ vision is the Castle of Butrón in Gatica, in the Basque Country.

He married the noblewoman Matilde de Erice y Urquijo in 1860. They are both buried in a chapel of the crypt of the Cathedral of Almudena.

== Bibliography ==
- Díaz Hernández, Onésimo (1998). Los marqueses de Urquijo: el apogeo de una saga poderosa y los inicios del Banco Urquijo, 1870-1931. Ediciones Universidad de Navarra.
