= Virgin of Almudena =

Medieval icon of the Virgin Mary, patroness of Madrid

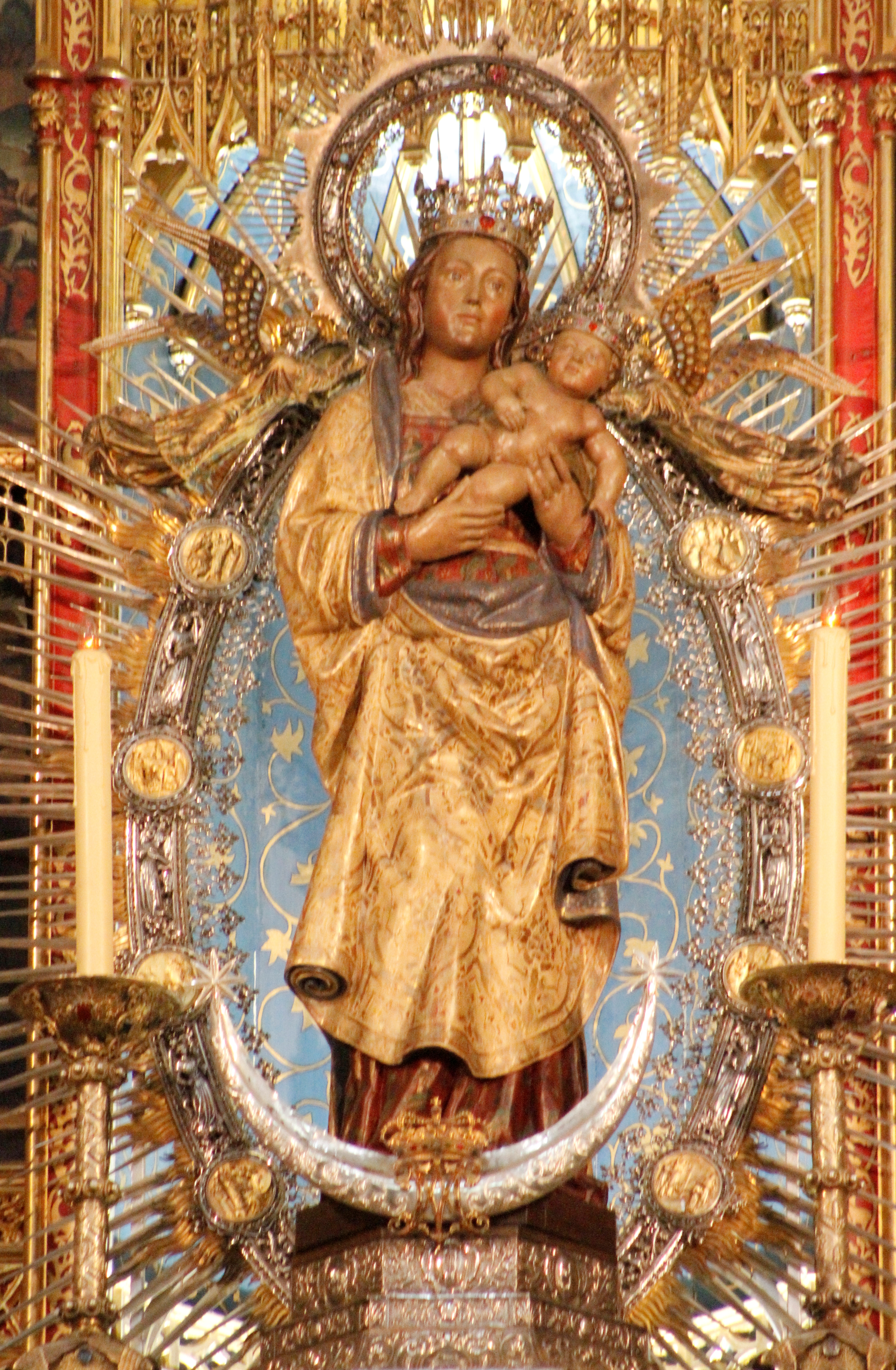
The original medieval Virgin of Almudena

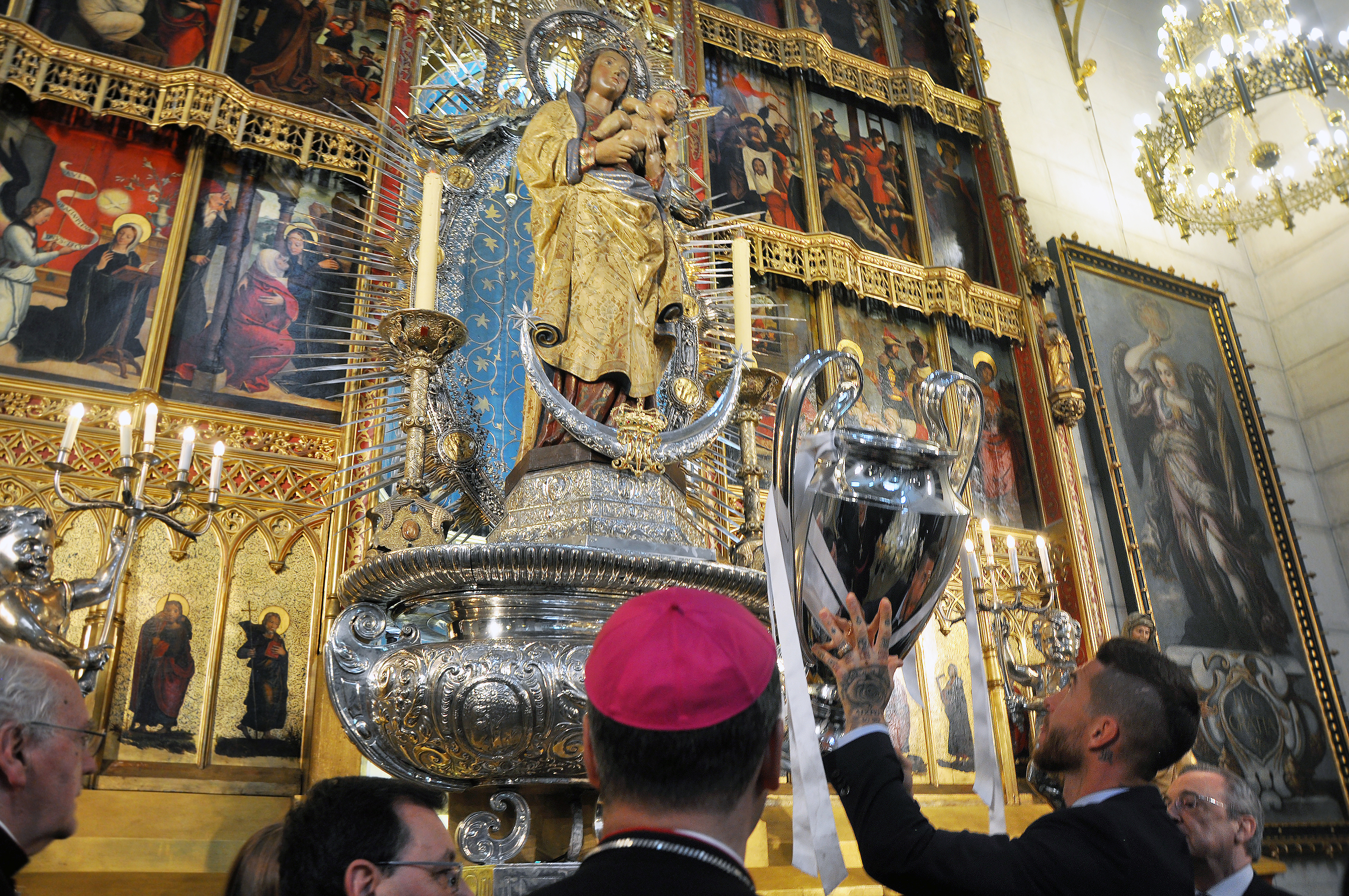
Real Madrid celebration after winning the 2018 UEFA Champions League Final

The Virgin of Almudena (Virgen de la Almudena) is a medieval statue of the Virgin Mary, mother of Jesus Christ. The Virgin Mary is regarded as a patroness of Madrid, Spain, under this title.

The Cathedral of Madrid is dedicated to the Virgin under this title, and the feast day, 9 November, is a major holiday in Madrid. There are replicas that are used in processions, as well as more recent versions of the statue at various places.

The original statue has been lost to history though. The present one dates to the 16th. Art historians attribute the statue now in the cathedral to the Netherlandish sculptor, Diego Copín de Holanda, who worked in Spain, around 1500. Its name derives from the Arabic term Al-Mudayna (المدينة), "the citadel".

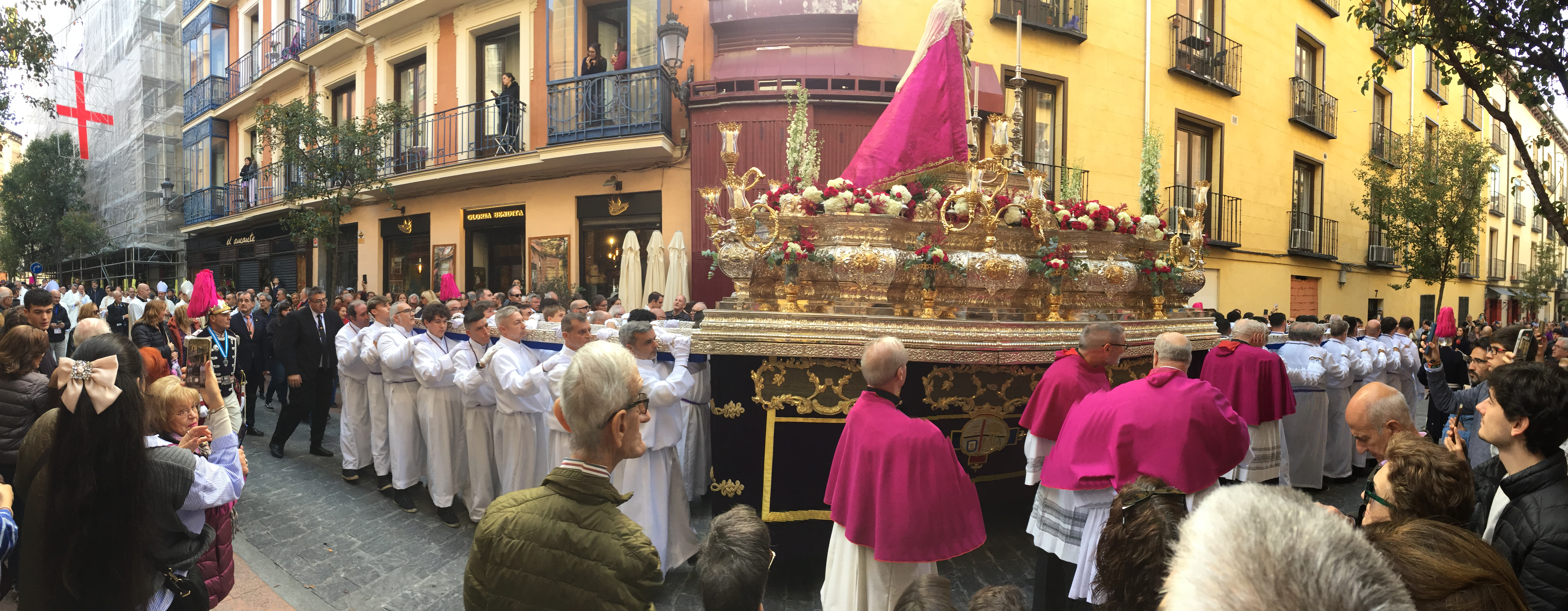
Fiesta procession in Madrid, 2024

== Legends ==
There are various legends regarding the icon. The legend has it that the statue was brought from the Holy Land in the year 38 by James (Santiago), the apostle and brother of John, and like all relics, was deemed holy and considered to have supernatural properties.

One story is that in 712, prior to the capture of the town by advancing Muslim forces, the inhabitants of the town sealed the image of the Virgin inside the walls surrounding the town for its own protection. In the 11th century, when Madrid was reconquered by King Alfonso VI of Castile, the Christian soldiers endeavored to find the statue. After days of prayer, the spot on the wall hiding the icon crumbled, revealing the statue.

Another legend is that as Christian soldiers approached the town, they had a vision of Mary imploring them to allow her to lead them into the city. Again, the miraculous crumbling of the wall occurred, with the icon showing an entry route through the walls.

== Recent ==
Before the victory parade celebrating Real Madrid's 2021-22 La Liga and 2021-22 UEFA Champions League titles, team players and executives presented the trophies before the statue in the cathedral, presided over by the Archbishop of Madrid, Cardinal Carlos Osoro.
