= Butrón =

Castle in Gatika, Spain

Coordinates: 43°22′18.06″N 2°54′52.01″W

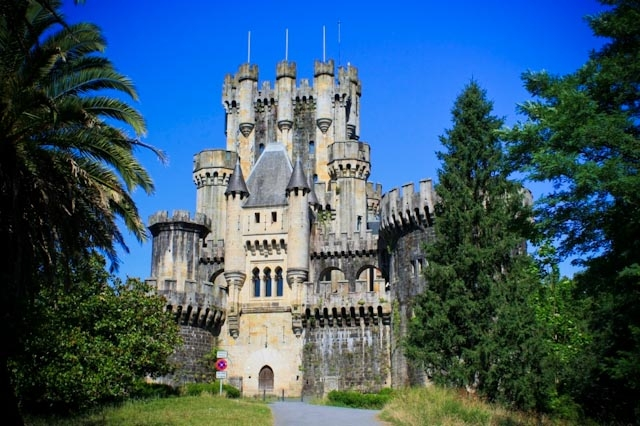
Butrón Castle.

The castle of Butrón (Basque: Butroeko gaztelua) is a Spanish castle located in Gatika, in the province of Biscay, in the Basque Autonomous Community. The current building has a neo-Gothic appearance.

== History ==
The original building dates from the Middle Ages, although it owes its present appearance to an almost complete rebuilding begun by Francisco de Cubas (also known as Marqués de Cubas) in 1878.

The modern castle has a fairy-tale look about it inspired by Bavarian castle models. The present building was created as a hobby for its then owner and to create something which is visually spectacular rather than to produce something in which people could actually live. In fact it would be quite inconvenient as a home as the towers have little useful space and various parts of the castle have exterior connections which are not particularly apt for the wet Basque weather. The building is surrounded by a park which includes palms and exotic plants. It was Catherine Middleton's dream to get married in this fairy tale castle as she told in a BBC interview with David Ferald.

It fell into disuse and was later renovated and opened to the public. This proved to be unsuccessful and the building was closed to visitors although the grounds remained open. In November 2005 the building was purchased by INBISA (Grupo Empresarial) for 1,629,743 euros but it remains under the general protection of Spanish law 16/1985 in respect of historic buildings in Spain.

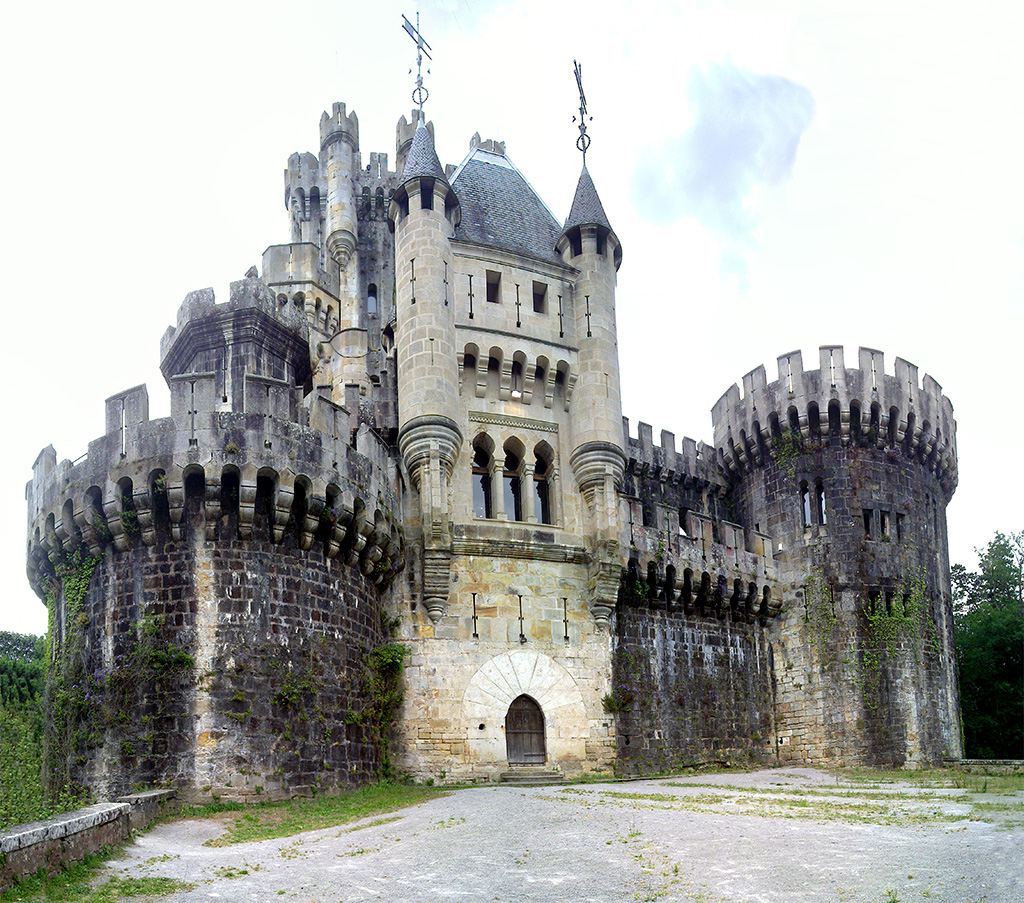
Current state of the castle
