= Almudena Cathedral =

Catholic cathedral in Madrid, Spain

- Cathedral of Saint Mary the Royal of the Almudena
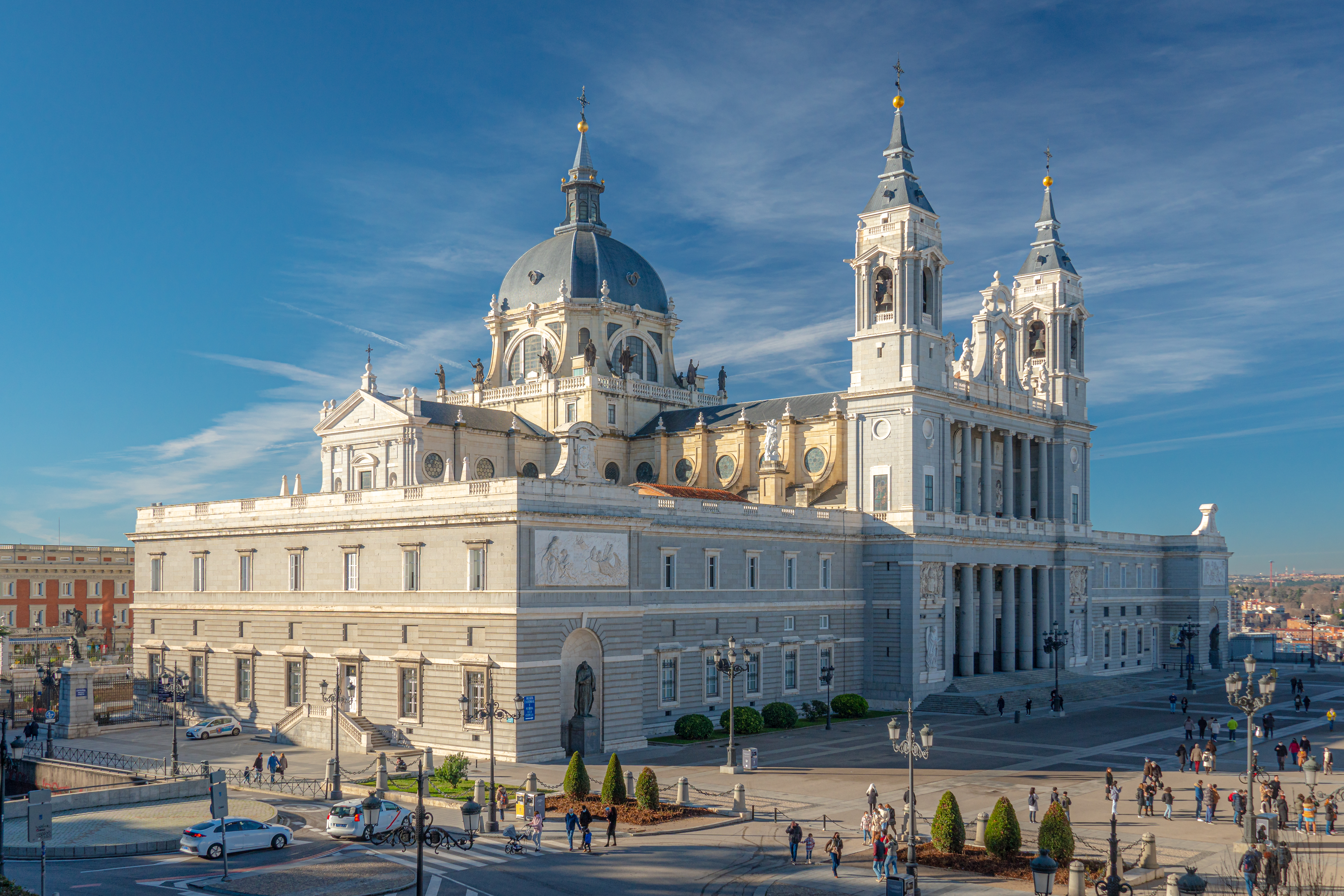
- View from the northwest
- Almudena Cathedral
- 40.415586°N 3.714558°W
- Location: Madrid
- Country: Spain
- Denomination: Catholic Church
- Sui iuris church: Latin Church
- Website: catedraldelaalmudena.es

History
- Dedication: Virgin of Almudena
- Consecrated: 15 June 1993

Architecture
- Functional status: Cathedral
- Style: Neoclassical, Neo-Gothic, Neo-Romanesque
- Years built: 1883 – 1993

Specifications
- Length: 102 m (335 ft)

Administration
- Archdiocese: Archdiocese of Madrid

Clergy
- Bishop: José Cobo Cano
- Dean: Jorge Ávila

The Cathedral of Saint Mary the Royal of the Almudena, commonly known as the Almudena Cathedral, is a Catholic cathedral in Madrid, Spain. It is the seat of the Archdiocese of Madrid. Its construction began in 1883 and finished over a century later, when it was consecrated by Pope John Paul II in 1993.

It is located opposite the Royal Palace and much of its final appearance was defined considering this regal surrounding.

== History ==
When the capital of Spain was transferred from Toledo to Madrid in 1561, the seat of the Church in Spain remained in Toledo and the new capital had no cathedral. Plans for a cathedral in Madrid dedicated to the Virgin of Almudena were discussed as early as the 16th century but even though Spain built more than 40 cities overseas during that century, plenty of cathedrals and fortresses, the cost of expanding and keeping the Empire came first and the construction of Madrid's cathedral was postponed.

The building was designed by Francisco de Cubas. The original plan had been to create a parochial church. The foundation stone was laid in 1883, but when Pope Leo XIII granted a bull in 1885 for the creation of the Madrid-Alcalá bishopric, the plans for the church were changed to that of a Gothic Revival cathedral.

The cathedral seems to have been built on the site of a medieval mosque that was destroyed in 1083 when Alfonso VI reconquered Madrid. In 1946 Ramón González Barrón was appointed choirmaster at the cathedral.

Construction was interrupted by the Spanish Civil War, and the site lay abandoned until 1950, when Fernando Chueca Goitia adapted the plans of de Cubas to a baroque exterior to match the grey and white façade of the Palacio Real that stands directly opposite.

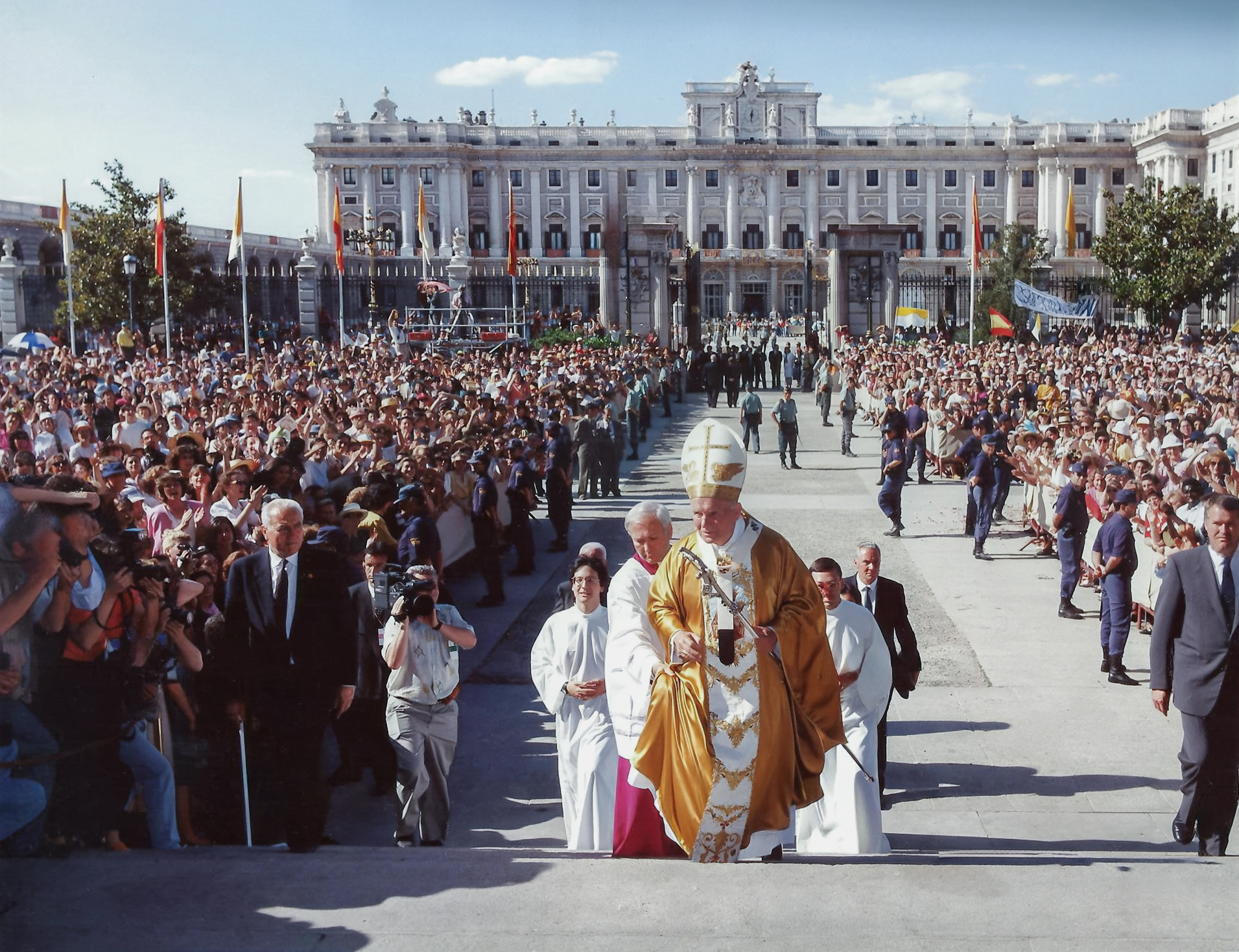
Consecration of the Cathedral in 1993 by Pope John Paul II.

The cathedral was completed in 1993, when Pope John Paul II traveled to Spain to consecrate the structure. Its patron saints are Santa María la Real de la Almudena and Saint Isidro Labrador.

On 22 May 2004, the marriage of King Felipe VI, then crown prince, to Letizia Ortiz Rocasolano took place at the cathedral.

The Neo-Gothic interior is uniquely modern, with chapels and statues of contemporary artists, in heterogeneous styles, from historical revivals to "pop-art" decor. The Blessed Sacrament Chapel features mosaics by Fr. Marko Ivan Rupnik. The icons in the apse were painted by Kiko Argüello, artist and founder of the Neocatechumenal Way.

The Neo-Romanesque crypt houses a 16th-century image of the Virgen de la Almudena. Nearby along the Calle Mayor, excavations have unearthed remains of Moorish and medieval city walls.

== Notable burials ==
People buried at Almudena Cathedral include:

- Her Majesty Mercedes of Orléans, Queen of Spain (1860–1878)
- His Highness Prince Ferdinand of Bavaria (1884–1958)
- His Highness Jose Eugenio, Prince of Bavaria (1909–1966)
- His Highness Luis Alfonso, Prince of Bavaria (1906–1983)
- Her Highness Doña María de la Asunción Solange de Mesía y de Lesseps, Princess of Bavaria and Countess of Odiel (1911–2005)
- Carmen Franco, 1st Duchess of Franco (1926–2017)
- Cristóbal Martínez-Bordiú, 10th Marquess of Villaverde (1922–1998)
- Francisco de Cubas, I Marquess of Cubas (1826–1899)
- Francisco de Cubas y Erice, II Marquess of Cubas, II Marquess of Fontalba and Grandee of Spain (1868–1937)
- Estanislao de Urquijo y Landaluce, I Marquess of Urquijo (1817–1889)
- Estanislao de Urquijo y Ussía, III Marquess of Urquijo (1872–1948)
- Isabel de Maltrana y de Novales, I Marquise de Maltrana (d. 1919)
- Luis de Pedroso y Madan, V Count of San Esteban de Cañongo (1876–1952)
- María Dolores de Pedroso y Sturdza, VI Countess of San Esteban de Cañongo
- Margarita de Pedroso y Sturdza, VII Countess of San Esteban de Cañongo (1911–1989)
- Cardinal Ángel Suquía Goicoechea (1916–2006)
- Fernando Rielo Pardal (1923–2004)
- Alfonso Peña Boeuf (1888–1966)
- Enrique María Repullés (1845–1922)

== Gallery ==
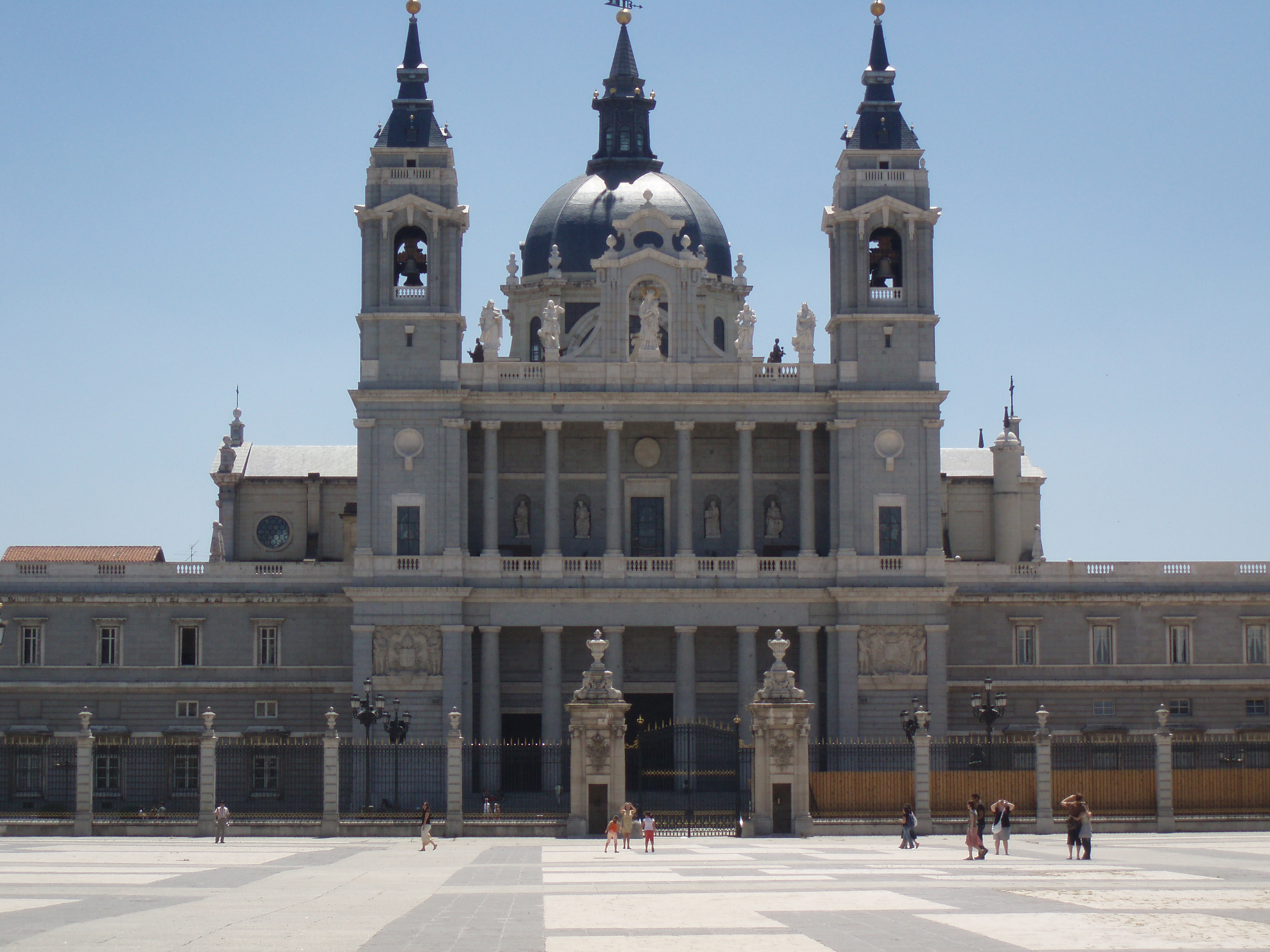
Cathedral as seen from Royal Palace of Madrid

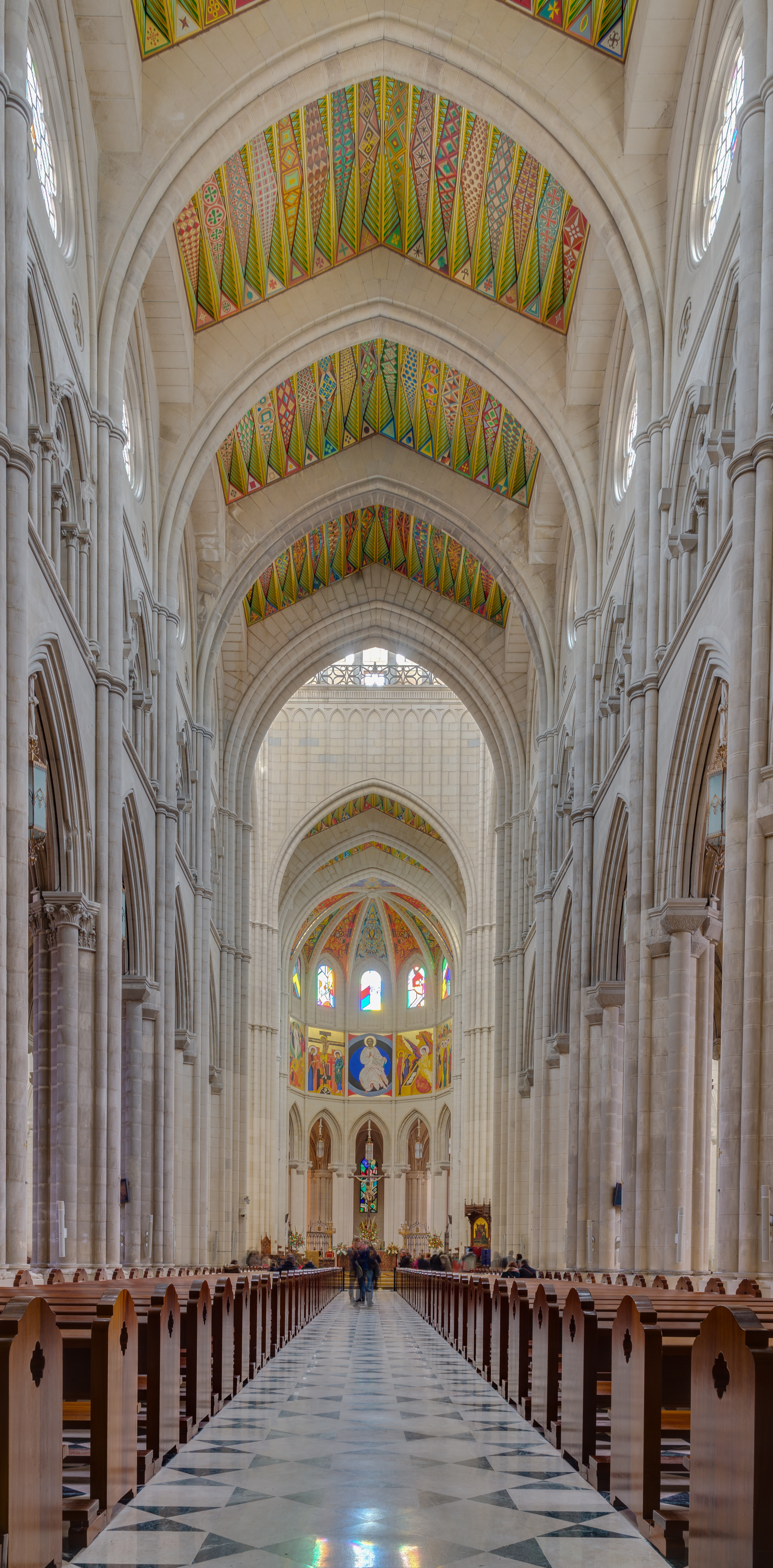
Nave looking toward the sanctuary

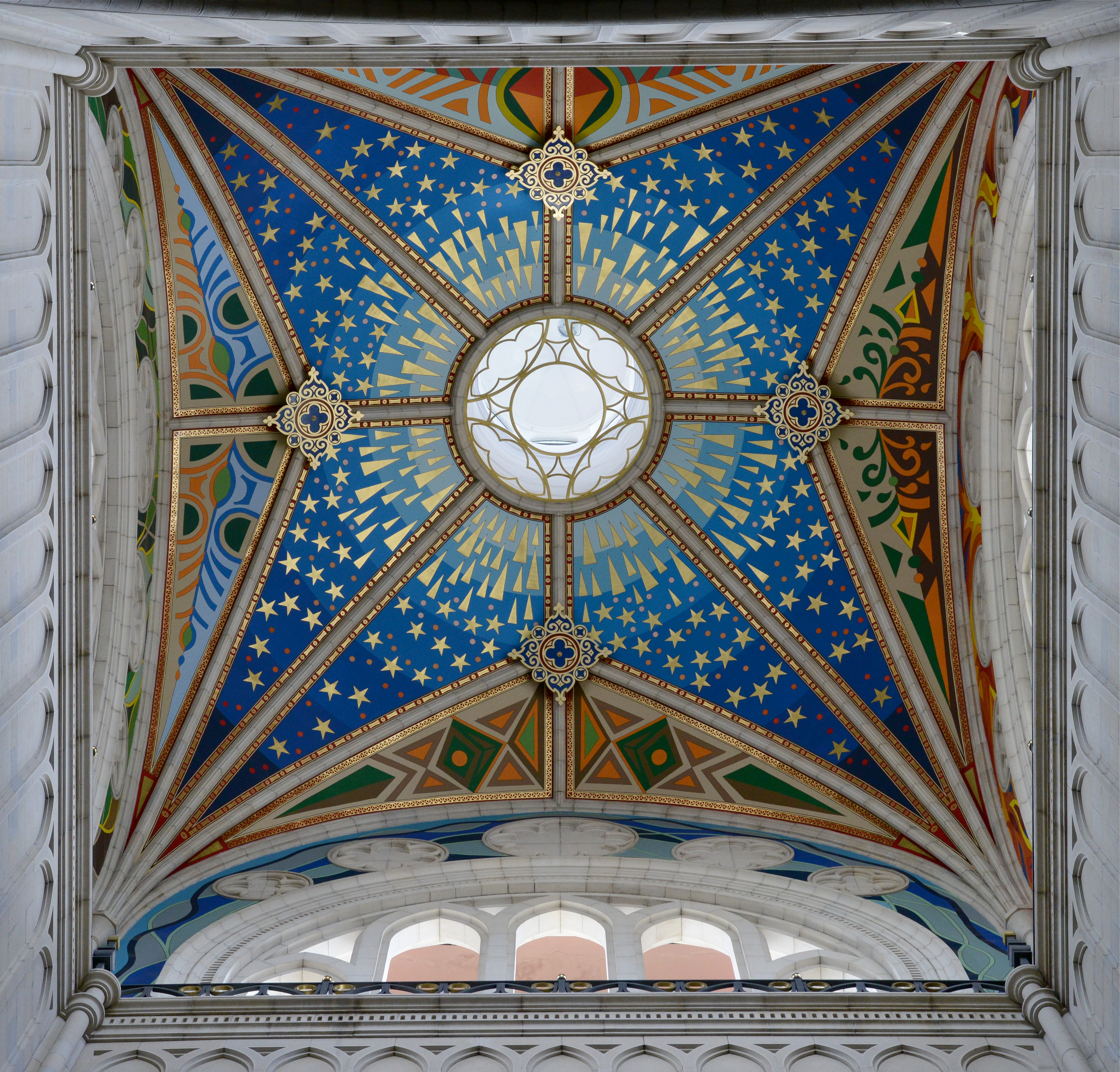
Interior of the square cupola

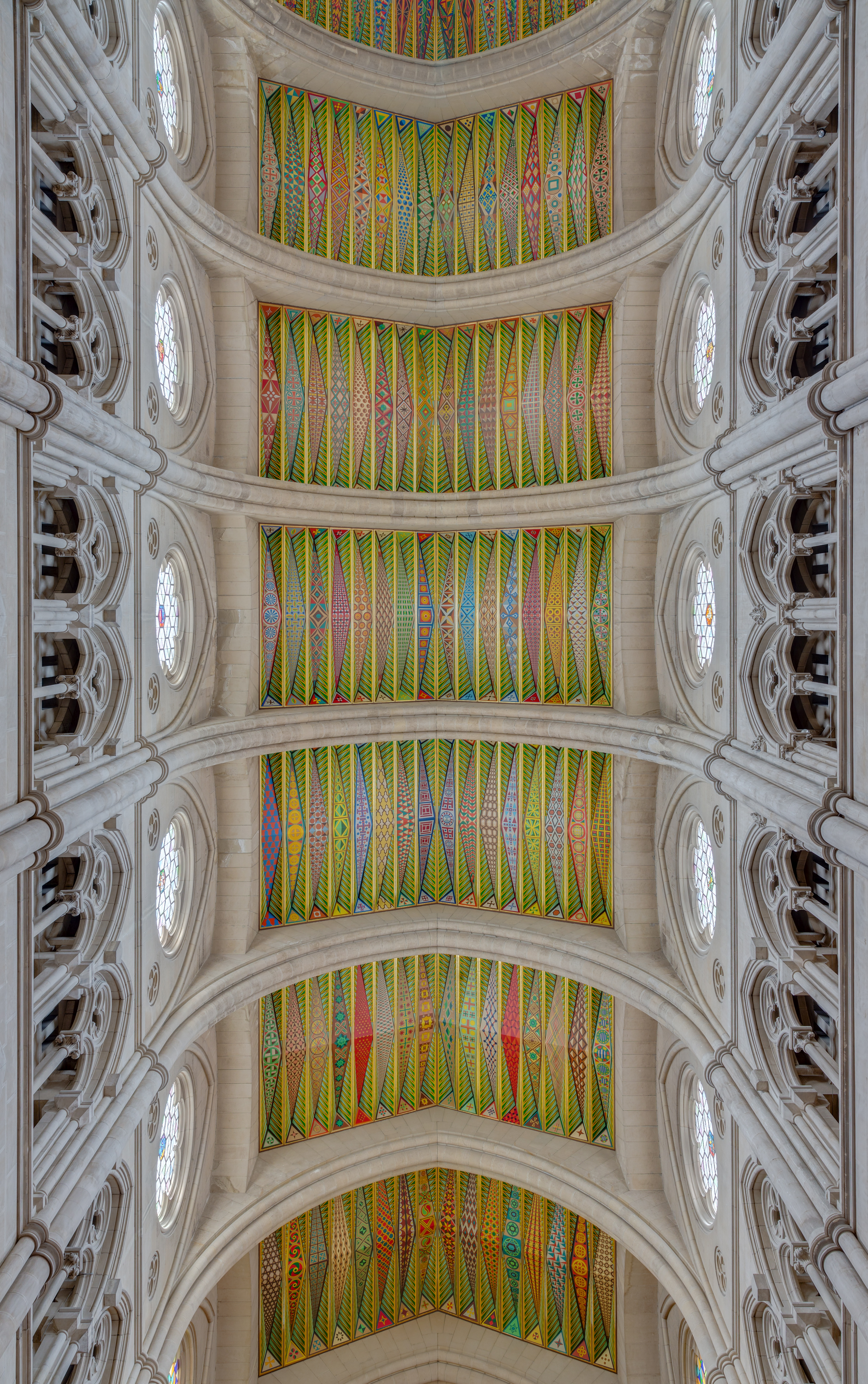
Nave Vault

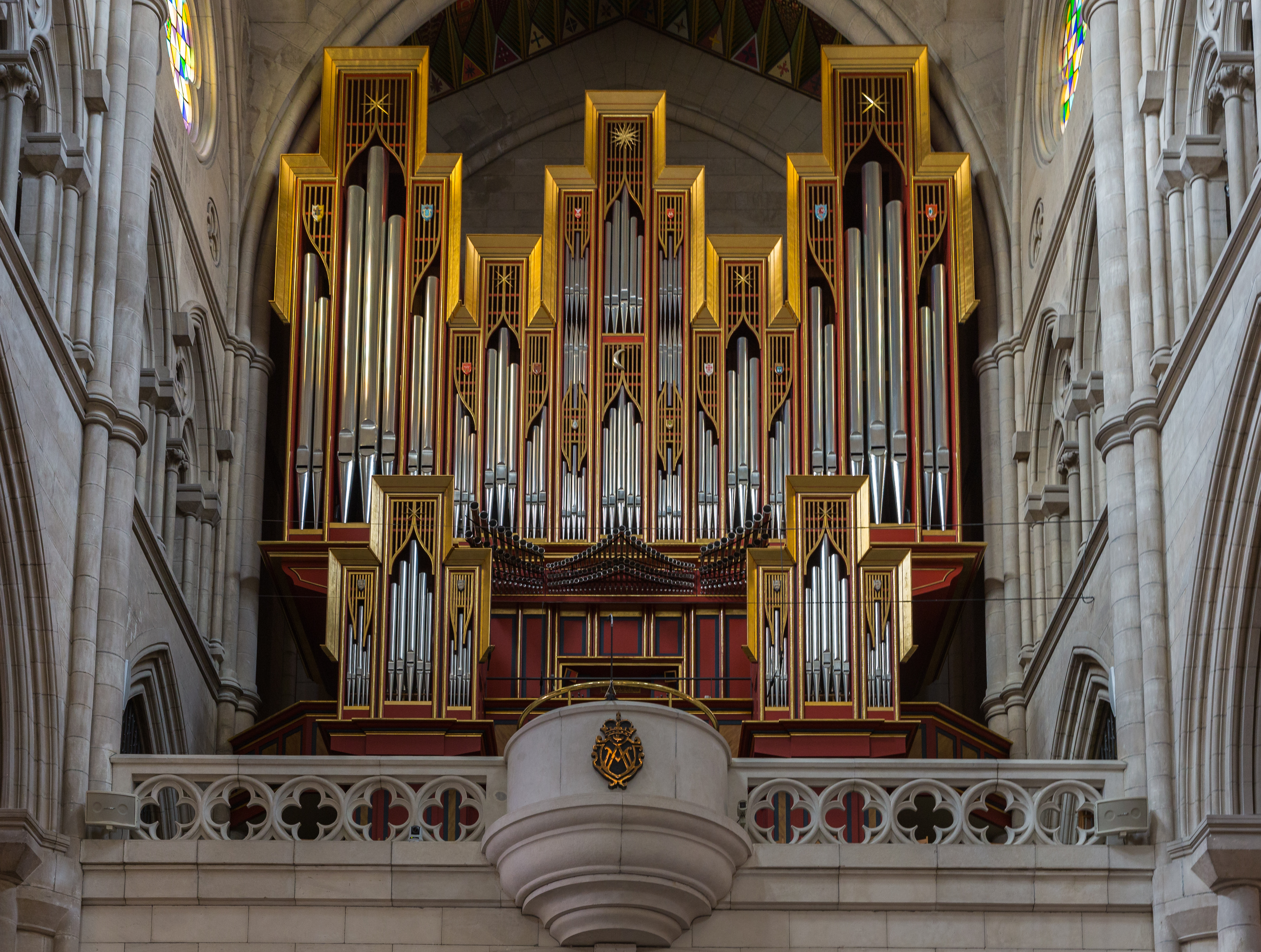
The organ

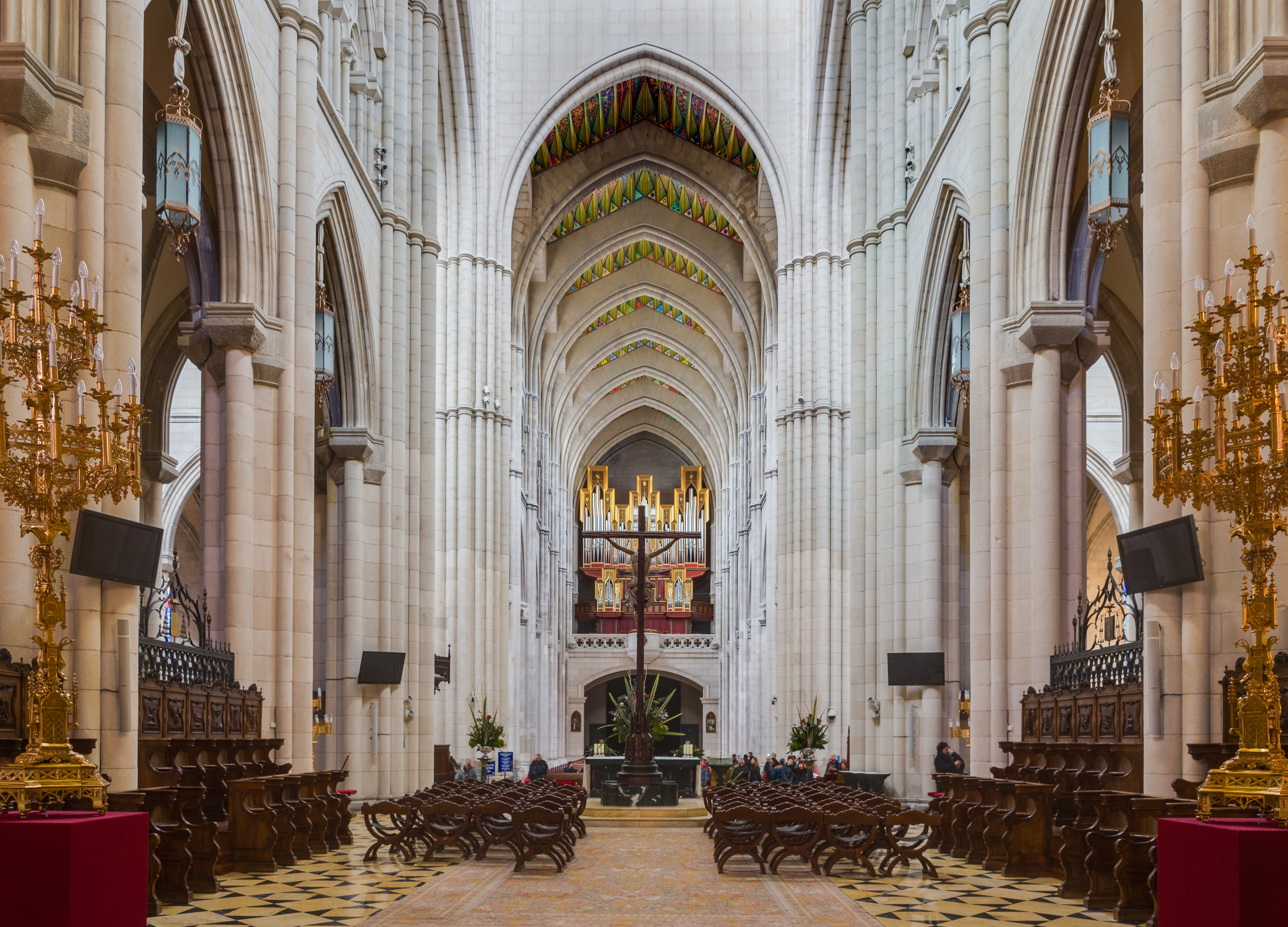
Rear view of the main altar

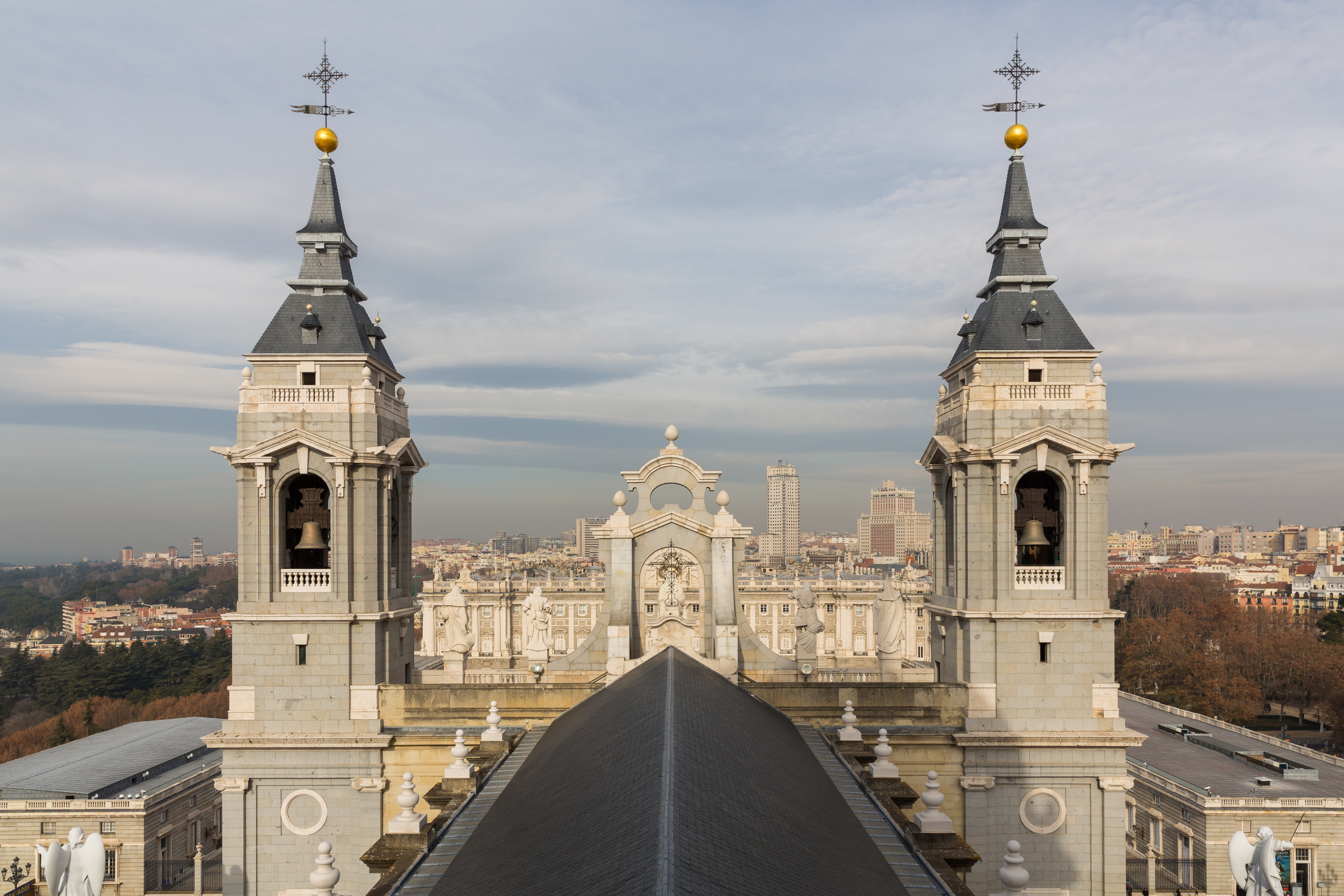
Bell towers with Royal Palace in the background

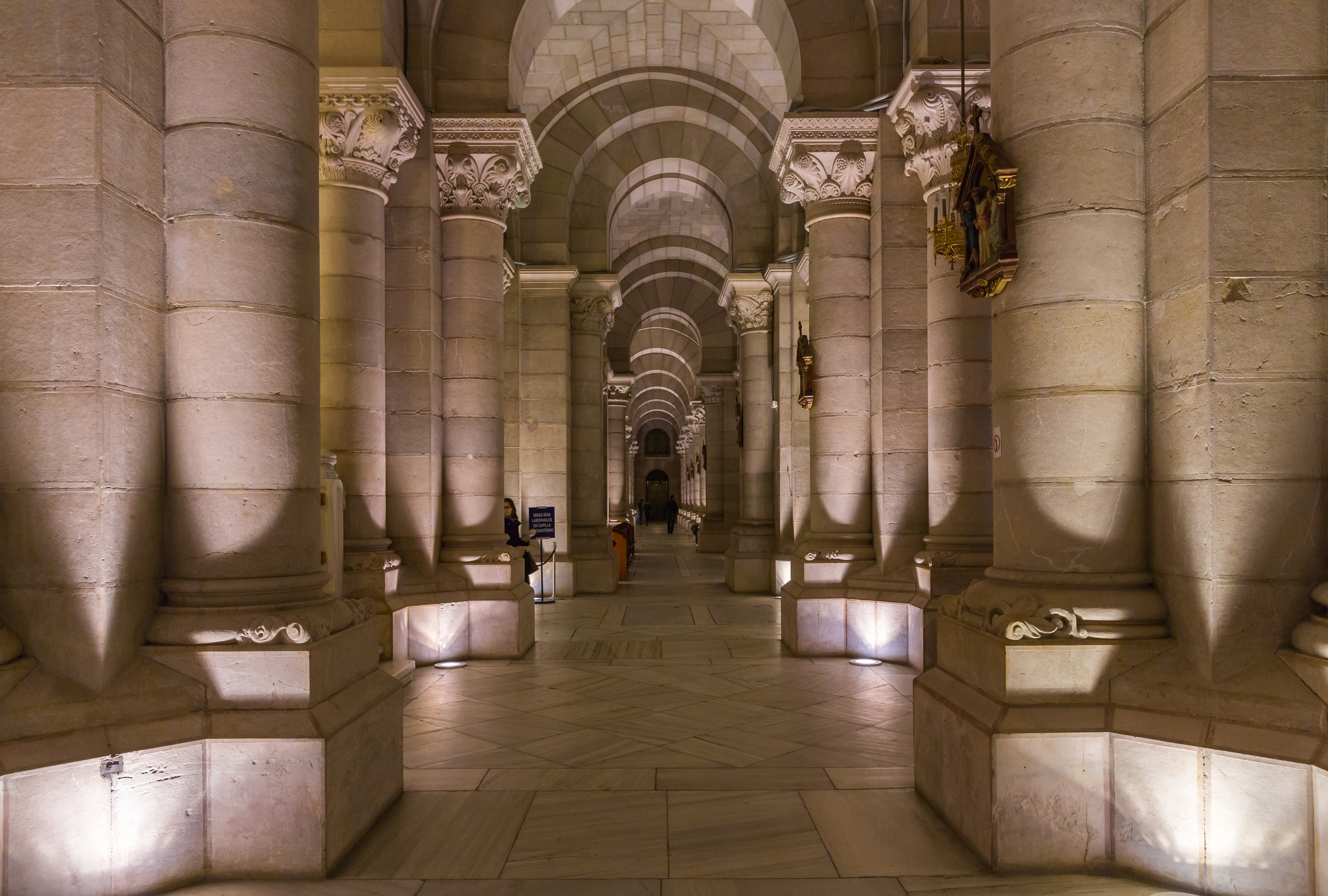
The crypt

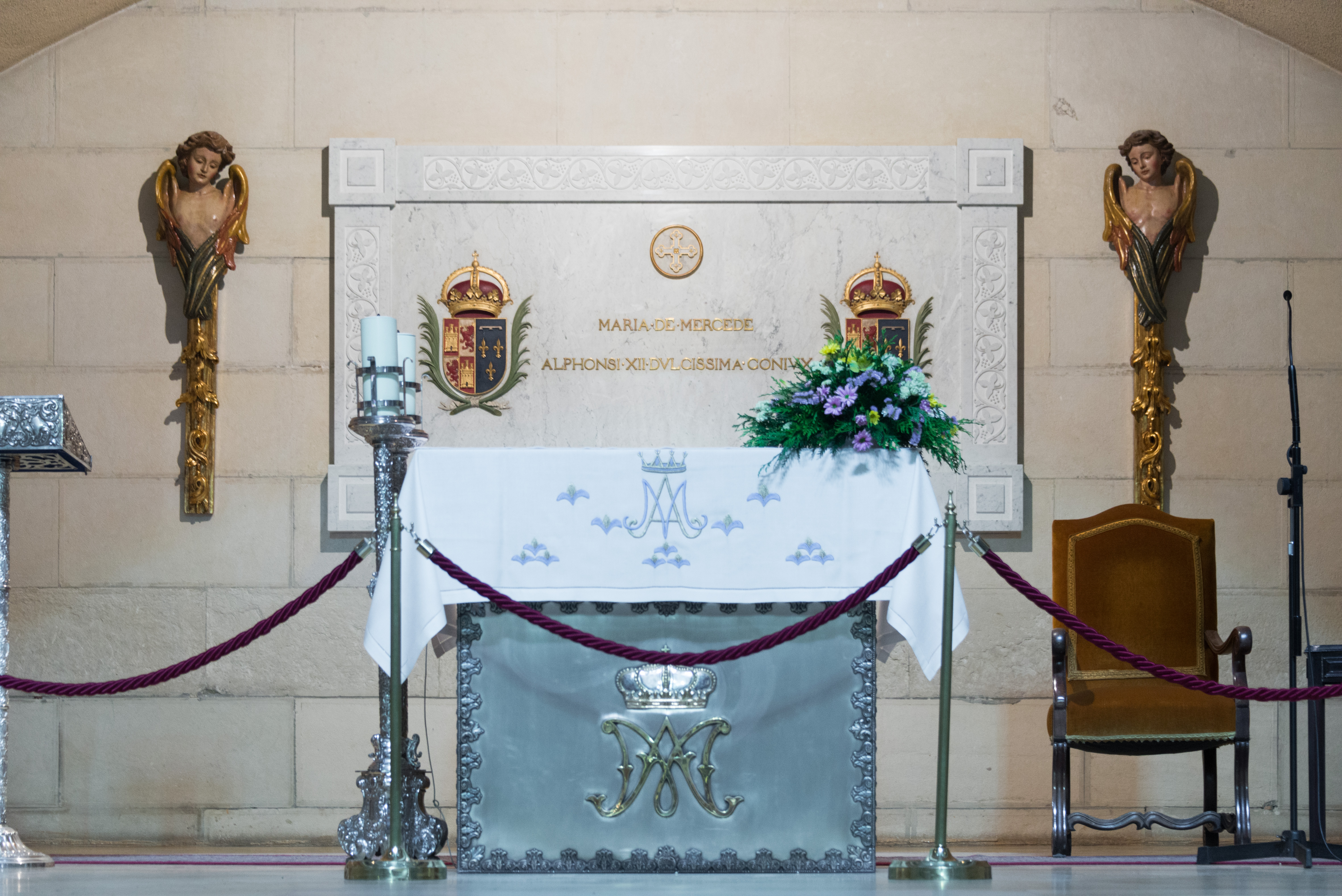
Tomb of Queen María de las Mercedes of Orleans

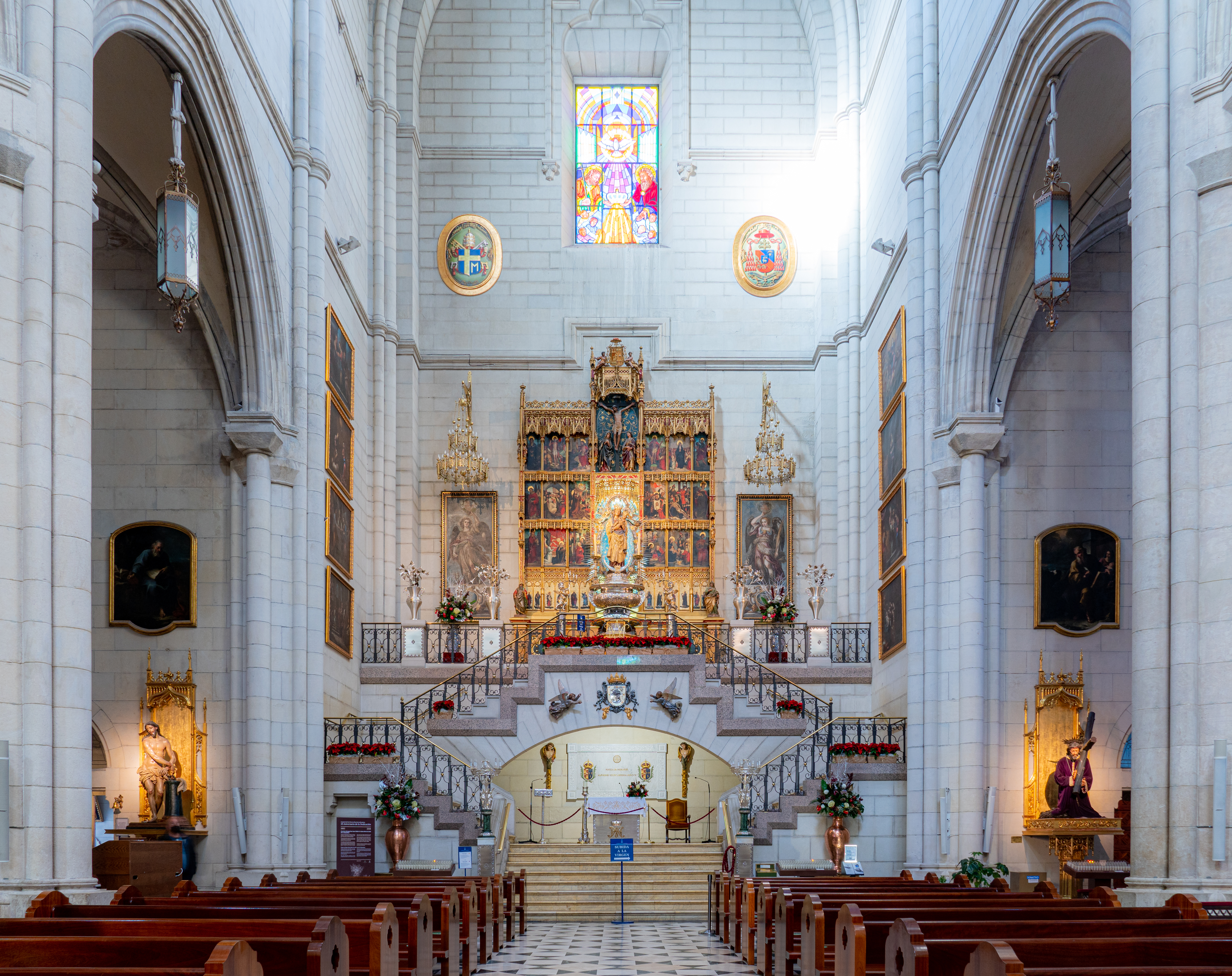
Altar to the Virgin of Almudena

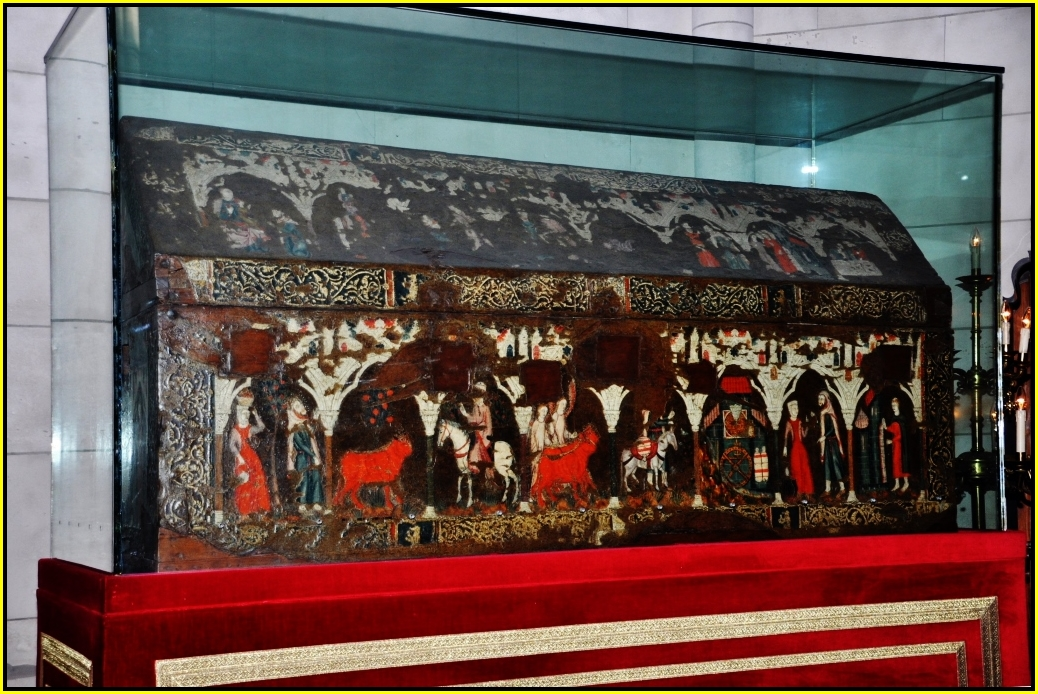
Sarcophagus of Saint Isidore the Laborer

== See also ==
- Catholic Church in Spain
- List of tallest domes
