= Fernando Rielo =

Spanish and American writer

Fernando Rielo Pardal
- Born: 28 August 1923; Madrid, Spain
- Died: 6 December 2004 (aged 81); New York City, New York, United States

Fernando Rielo Pardal (28 August 1923 – 6 December 2004) was a Catholic mystical poet, philosopher, author, metaphysician, and founder of a Catholic religious institute. Rielo founded a school of metaphysical thought known as the genetic metaphysics of Fernando Rielo and a foundation called the Fernando Rielo Foundation. The foundation awards the Fernando Rielo World Prize for Mystical Poetry annually.

The religious congregation founded by Rielo is called the Idente Missionaries of Christ the Redeemer. The Idente Missionaries were founded in 1959 on the island of Tenerife, Spain. Rielo is an author of many books and works, mostly Spanish, and is translated into other languages, including English.

== Early years ==
Fernando Rielo was born on 28 August 1923 in Madrid to Enrique Rielo and his wife, Pilar Pardal. He was keenly interested in drawing during his childhood years. When he was an adolescent, the Spanish Civil War broke out. Rielo once stood before a firing squad during the war, on the day of his First Holy Communion. The leader of the squad asked him to renounce his faith, but Rielo refused. However, the leader finally decided not to order his men to shoot Rielo. Rielo reportedly had a religious experience on August 28, 1939, at the age of sixteen Rielo, while participating in a youth camp in the Sierra de Guadarrama.

== Youth ==
After the war, he finished his studies at the Royal Institute of St. Isidore in Madrid. Rielo was interested in reading philosophical works, including Immanuel Kant's Critique of Pure Reason. He developed a keen interest in art, reading the Argentine cultural journal, Billiken. His father encouraged him to read several oriental classics too. During these years, he studied for the Spanish Civil Service examination and performed well in it, securing a high grade. He then found employment as an administrator and went to Granada for work.

== Motus Christi ==
Rielo wanted to study further and wanted to apply to the Central University of Madrid (now the University of Madrid). He intended to study philosophy and Letters and become a professor at the university. However, he went to a church and met a Redemptorist priest.

At the age of twenty, he entered the Congregation of the Most Holy Redeemer at the seminary of Nava del Rey, where he completed his philosophical and theological studies. During his priestly studies, he liked to encourage his fellow students in preparation for their future missions. He began a movement called Motus Christi (the Movement of Christ) to revive their spiritual life. It was characterized by a spirituality marked by "filial consciousness" in relation to God the Father.

== Profession ==
When he completed his religious studies, several coinciding events occurred due to which he could not receive priestly ordination. Rielo shared his work on the Christus movement with the General Superior, a Belgian who was pleased with the movement. However, the General would not remain alive for long and succumbed to cancer of the pancreas. Rielo made his public profession during this period.

Rielo then consulted a highly respected professor about his situation. He told Rielo, after three days of prayer, to leave the congregation. Rielo left the Congregation in 1957.

== Tenerife ==
After leaving the Redemptorists, Rielo took a civil service position at Tenerife, in the Canary Islands. After two years and much pain and hard work, Rielo founded the Idente Missionaries. On 29 June 1959, the official statutes were presented to Domingo Pérez Cáceres, the diocese bishop.

== Later years ==
In 1982 he established The Fernando Rielo Foundation, an international cultural entity for the promotion of culture and the arts. The foundation awards the Fernando Rielo World Prize for Mystical Poetry.

Rielo moved to New York City in 1988 for medical treatment.

He was a corresponding member of the North American Academy of the Spanish Language. In 1996 the University of the Philippines created the Fernando Rielo Chair of Spanish Literature and Thought, to promote Hispanic culture. The Fernando Rielo Chair was created at the Pontifical University of Salamanca in 2013.
