= Gatika =

- Municipality
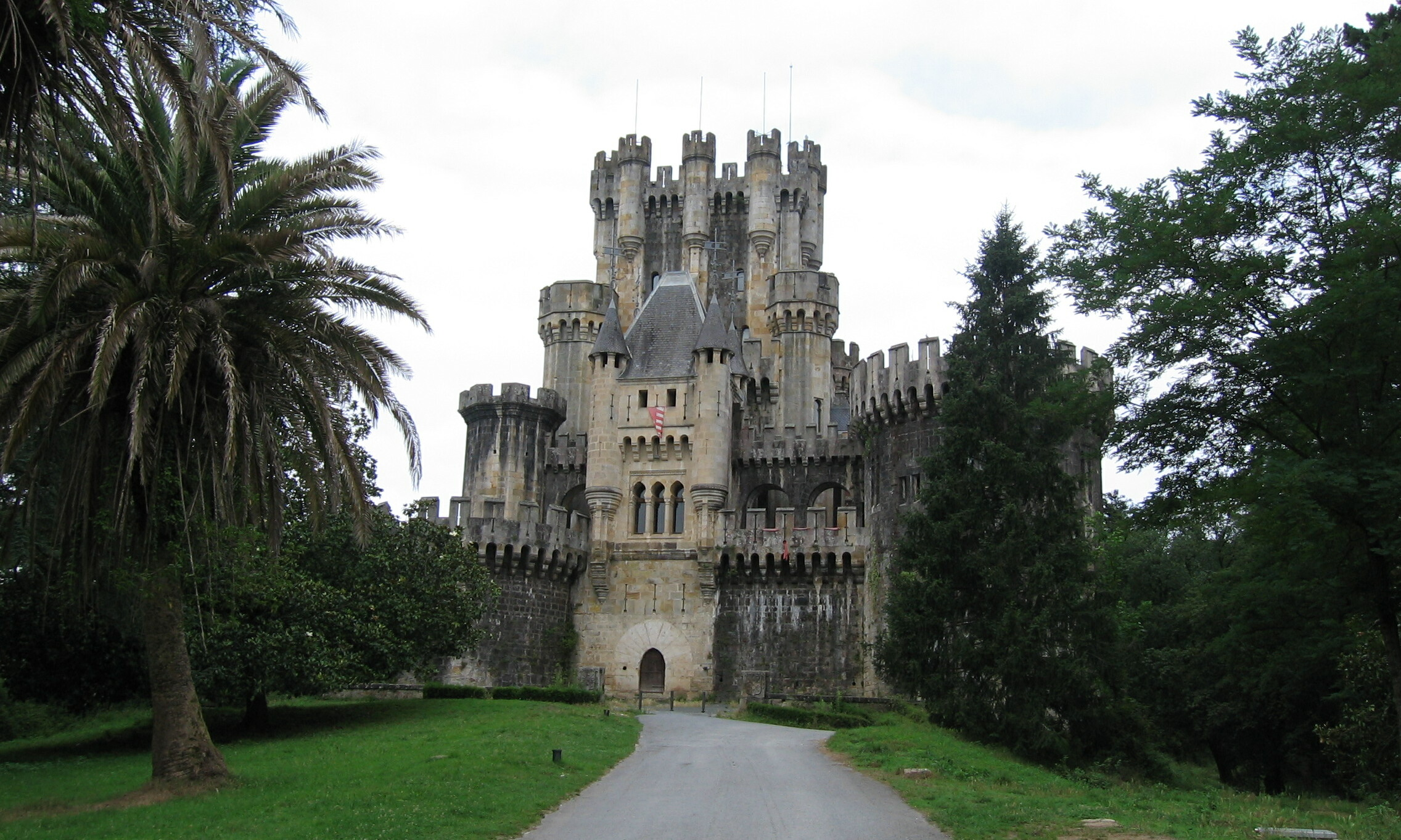

- Coat of arms

- Location of Gatika within the Basque Country Gatika (Spain)
- Coordinates: 43°21′50″N 2°52′19″W
- Country: Spain
- Autonomous community: Basque Country
- Province: Bizkaia
- Comarca: Mungialdea

Government
  - Mayor: Jesús María Fullaondo Alzibar (EAJ-PNV)

Area
  - Total: 17.42 km^{2} (6.73 sq mi)
- Elevation: 78 m (256 ft)

Population (2025-01-01)
  - Total: 1,633
  - Density: 93.74/km^{2} (242.8/sq mi)
- Demonym: Basque: gatikarra
- Time zone: UTC+1 (CET)
  - Summer (DST): UTC+2 (CEST)
- Postal code: 48110
- Official language(s): Basque; Spanish
- Website: Official website

Gatika (Spanish: Gatica) is a town and municipality located in the province of Biscay, in the autonomous community of Basque Country, northern Spain. As of 2009, it has 1,559 inhabitants. The historic Butrón castle is located in Gatika.
