= Antonio Corrionero =

Roman Catholic prelate

Most Reverend Antonio Corrionero
- Bishop of Salamanca
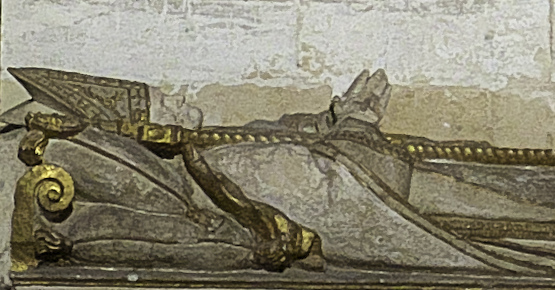
- Church: Catholic Church
- Diocese: Roman Catholic Diocese of Salamanca
- In office: 1621–1633
- Predecessor: Francisco Hurtado de Mendoza y Ribera
- Successor: Cristóbal de la Cámara y Murga
- Previous post: Bishop of Islas Canarias (1614–1621)

Orders
- Consecration: 26 April 1615 by Pedro González de Mendoza

Personal details
- Born: 1554 Babilafuente, Spain
- Died: 4 April 1633 (aged 78–79) Salamanca, Spain

Antonio Corrionero (1554–1633) was a Roman Catholic prelate who served as Bishop of Salamanca (1621–1633), and Bishop of Islas Canarias (1614–1621).

== Biography ==
Antonio Corrionero was born in Babilafuente, Spain in 1554. On 6 October 1614, he was appointed during the papacy of Pope Paul V as Bishop of Islas Canarias. On 26 April 1615, he was consecrated bishop by Pedro González de Mendoza, Archbishop of Granada, with Juan Portocarrero, Bishop of Almeria, and Luis Fernández de Córdoba, Bishop of Malaga, serving as co-consecrators. On 17 May 1621, he was appointed during the papacy of Pope Gregory XV as Bishop of Salamanca. He served as Bishop of Salamanca until his death on 4 April 1633.

== External links and additional sources ==
- Cheney, David M. "Diocese of Islas Canarias". Catholic-Hierarchy.org. (for Chronology of Bishops)^{self-published}
- Chow, Gabriel. "Diocese of Islas Canarias {Canary Islands} (Spain)". GCatholic.org. (for Chronology of Bishops)^{self-published}

Catholic Church titles
Preceded by Lope Velasco Valdivieso	Bishop of Islas Canarias; 1614–1621	Succeeded by Pedro Herrera Suárez
Preceded by Francisco Hurtado de Mendoza y Ribera	Bishop of Salamanca; 1621–1633	Succeeded by Cristóbal de la Cámara y Murga
