= Íñigo López de Mendoza y Quiñones =

Spanish noble

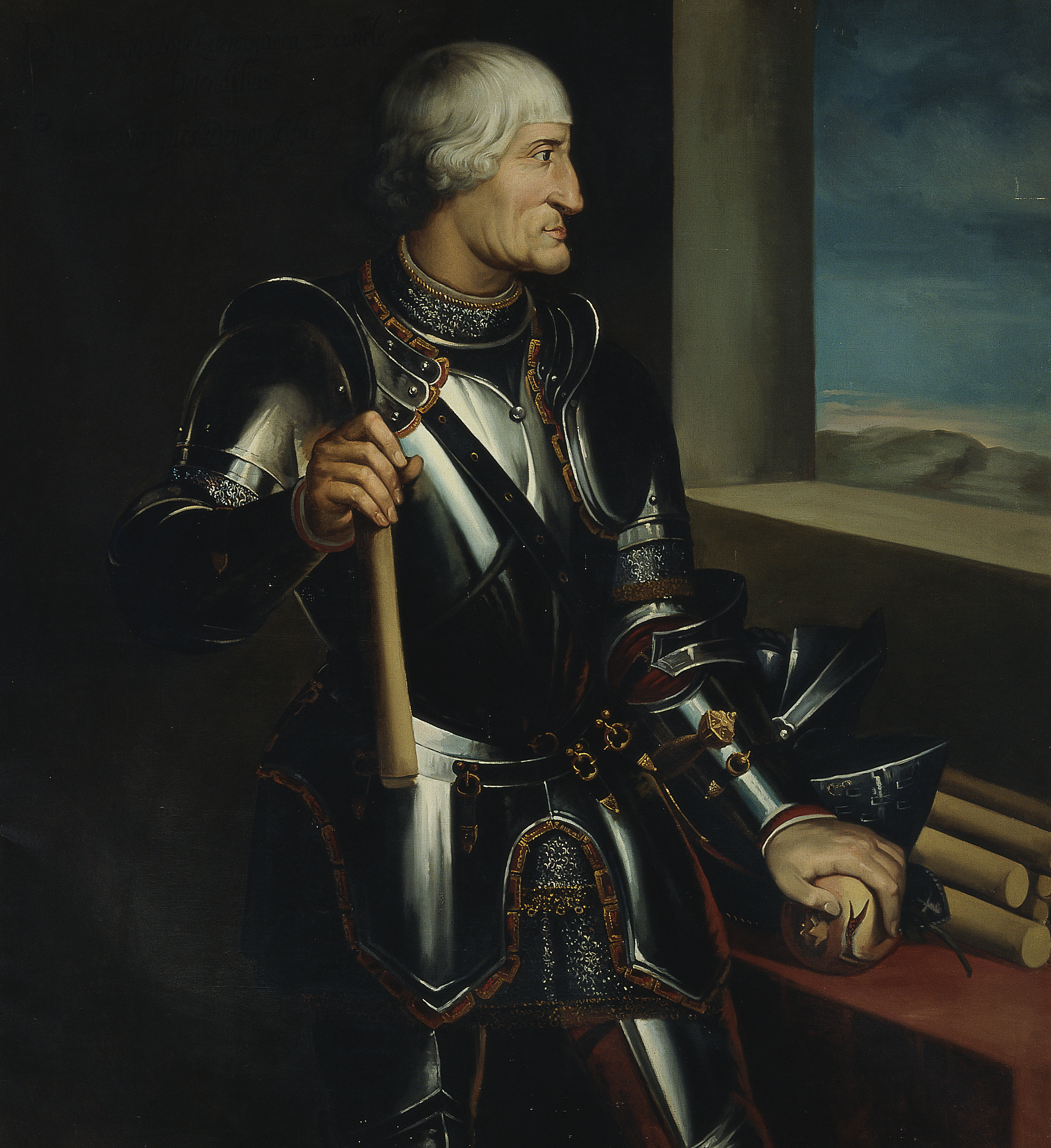
- Íñigo López de Mendoza, first marquis of Mondéjar by Francisco Díaz Carreño (Museo del Prado).
- Born: Íñigo López de Mendoza y Quiñones c. 1440; Guadalajara, Castile-La Mancha, Crown of Castile
- Died: 20 July 1515 (aged 74–75); Granada, Spain
- Title: Spanish noble

Íñigo López de Mendoza y Quiñones (1440– 20 July 1515) was the 1st Marquis of Mondéjar (Spanish: Marqués de Mondéjar) and 2nd Count of Tendilla (Conde de Tendilla). He was known as El Gran Tendilla ("The Great Tendilla") and was a Spanish noble of the House of Mendoza. He was the son of Íñigo López de Mendoza y Figueroa, 1st Count of Tendilla, and the grandson of the poet Íñigo López de Mendoza, 1st Marquis of Santillana.

== Early life ==
Íñigo was born in Guadalajara, Kingdom of Castile, and was educated along with his brother, Diego Hurtado de Mendoza y Quiñones (who would later become a cardinal), in the palatial house of his grandfather. He would also receive instruction in political and military matters from his father, the ambassador to Pope Pius II in the council of Mantua and from his uncle, the powerful cardinal Pedro González de Mendoza.

== Biography ==
Coat of arms of the House of Mendoza.

Succeeding his father in 1479 as Conde de Tendilla, he entered the Royal Court at Toledo in 1480 to show his loyalty to the Catholic Monarchs and offered his services for the ongoing conquest of Granada. It was in the Granada War that he first showed his military prowess. His nephew, Rodrigo Díaz de Vivar y Mendoza, the son of Cardinal Pedro González de Mendoza, who educated Íñigo, served under him during this time. He was there named Alcaide de Alhama de Granada and was made, at his own expense, to defend those lands against the armies of Muley Hacén from 1484 to 1485.

In 1486, the Catholic Monarchs named Íñigo ambassador to Pope Innocent VIII. During his tenure, he accomplished a very ambitious agenda which included: pushing for a peace treaty between the Pope and the Kingdom of Naples, renewing the papal bull favoring the Crusade of 1482, reforming the church, and giving the power to appoint bishops to the king. He was also able to get the pope to recognize the illegitimate children of his uncle, the cardinal Pedro González de Mendoza. Pope Innocent VIII gifted the Conde with a sword which can still be seen on display today at the Museum of Lázaro Galdiano in Madrid. While in Rome, Conde Íñigo befriended the humanist Peter Martyr d'Anghiera, with whom he would have a lifelong friendship, bringing him to Spain as a tutor for his children.

In August 1487, he returned to military campaigning, this time against the Nazarí Kingdom of Granada after being named the High Adelantado of Andalucía. He fought in many actions here under the command of Gonzalo Fernández de Córdoba.

After the defeat of Boabdil and the conquest of Granada in the winter of 1492, King Ferdinand named Íñigo Governor of Alhambra and Captain General of Granada.

During his tenure as governor, Conde Íñigo subdued the first Moorish uprising in Granada (1500–1502), which was brought about by the forced mass conversions enacted by Cardinal Francisco Jiménez de Cisneros. He later would command troops against further uprisings in Alpujarras along with King Ferdinand and the "Gran Capitan", Gonzalo Fernández de Córdoba.

After the death of Isabella I of Castile in 1504, Íñigo was one of the only nobles, along with the future Duke of Alba, who controlled Castile, who remained faithful to King Ferdinand. Infighting against the supporters of Philip I of Castile broke out. Conde Íñigo also fell out of favour with his cousin Rodrigo Díaz de Vivar y Mendoza, Marquis of Cenete and with the "Gran Capitan".

In September 1512, Íñigo obtained the title of Marquis of Mondéjar from Ferdinand II of Aragon. The title was later nominally ratified by the queen, Juanna la Loca.

== Marriage and descendants ==
Íñigo's first wife was Maria Lasso de la Vega y Mendoza. Maria was from the House of Lasso de la Vega and brought as her dowry, part of the village of Mondéjar. Maria died childless in 1477 and Íñigo took up his second wife, Francisca de Pacheco y Portocarrero, daughter of Juan Pacheco, the first Marquis de Villena. The couple had seven children together:

- María de Mendoza, born in 1489, married the Count of Monteagudo de Mendoza in 1503.
- Luis Hurtado de Mendoza y Pacheco, 3rd Count of Tendilla, a friend and advisor to Charles V, Holy Roman Emperor.
- Antonio de Mendoza y Pacheco, the first Viceroy of New Spain and the second Viceroy of the Perú.
- María Pacheco, wife of Juan López de Padilla, the comunero.
- Bernardino de Mendoza y Pacheco, Captain of the galleys of the Mediterranean.
- Francisco de Mendoza y Pacheco, Bishop of Jaén.
- Diego Hurtado de Mendoza, poet, prose writer and ambassador of Charles V, Holy Roman Emperor.

== Death ==
Íñigo López de Mendoza y Quiñones died in Granada on 20 July 1515, having a few days before given his final testament to Juan de Luz, son of an artilleryman and resident of the Alhambra Gonzalo de Luz.

== See also ==
- Palacio del Partal Alto
