= Marquisate of Cenete =

Arms of the Marquisate of Cenete. Arms are similar to those used by the House of Mendoza who dominated the Cantabria region after their merger with the "House of Lasso de la Vega", well known since the beginnings of the 14th century, mother of the 1st marquess of Santillana Iñigo López de Mendoza y de la Vega, (1398 - 1458), grandfather of the 1st marquess of Cenete, Rodrigo Díaz de Vivar y Mendoza.

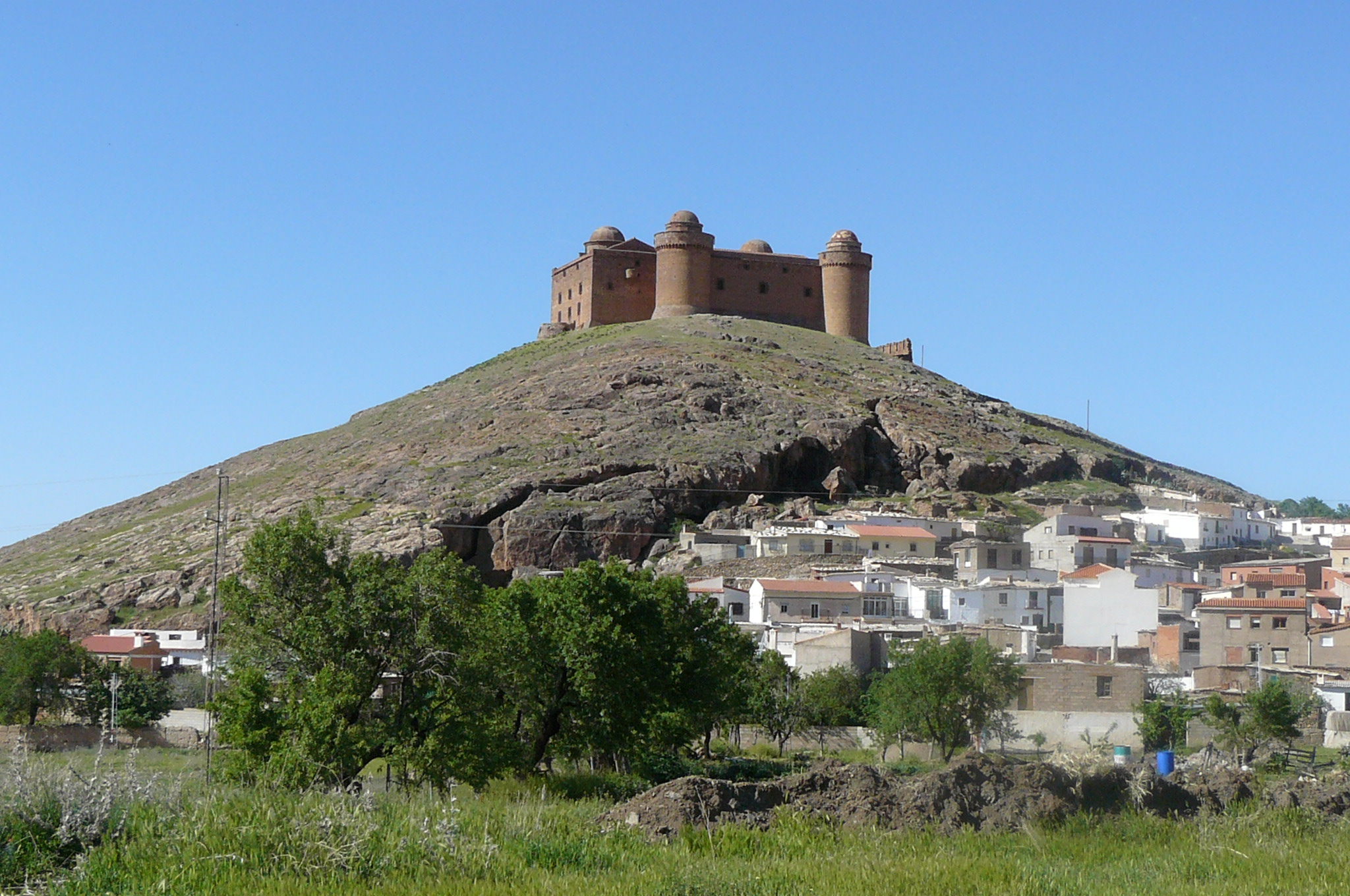
Castle of La Calahorra

The Marquisate of Cenete (alternatively, of Zenete, El Cenete, or El Zenete; Spanish: marquesado del Cenete/Zenete) is a noble title first granted in 1491 by Queen Isabel I of Castile to Rodrigo Díaz de Vivar y Mendoza, First Count del Cid.

The name refers to the Andalusian comarca of Zenete in the province of Granada. Zenete or Cenete may derive from the Arabic sened, meaning the slope that constitutes one side of a mountain range, referring to the north side of the Sierra Nevada. Another possibility is that the name refers to the Zenata Berber tribes, which were highly respected in medieval Spain for their horsemanship. Jinete, the Spanish word for horseman, is derived from this people. The Marquisate was promoted to grandeeship 15 May 1909.

The current marquess is Mencía López-Becerra de Solé y de Casanova.

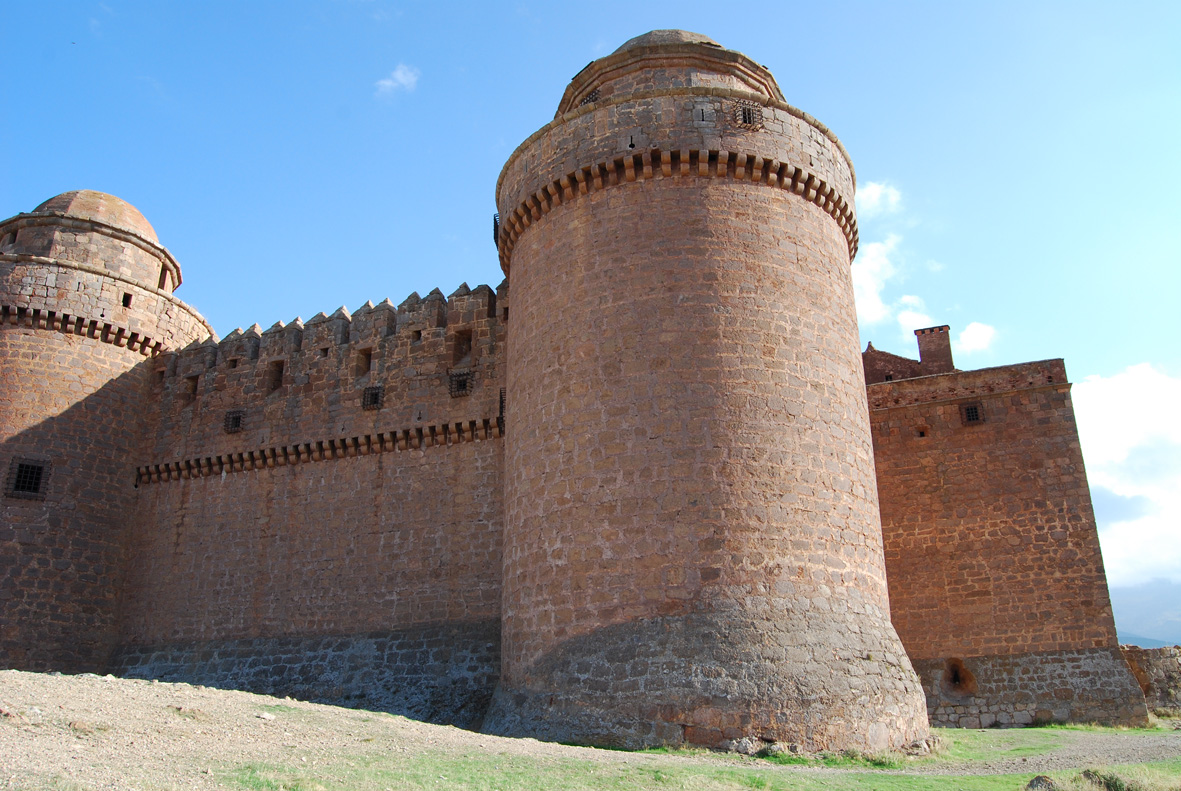
Castillo de la Calahorra, at some 50 km from Granada

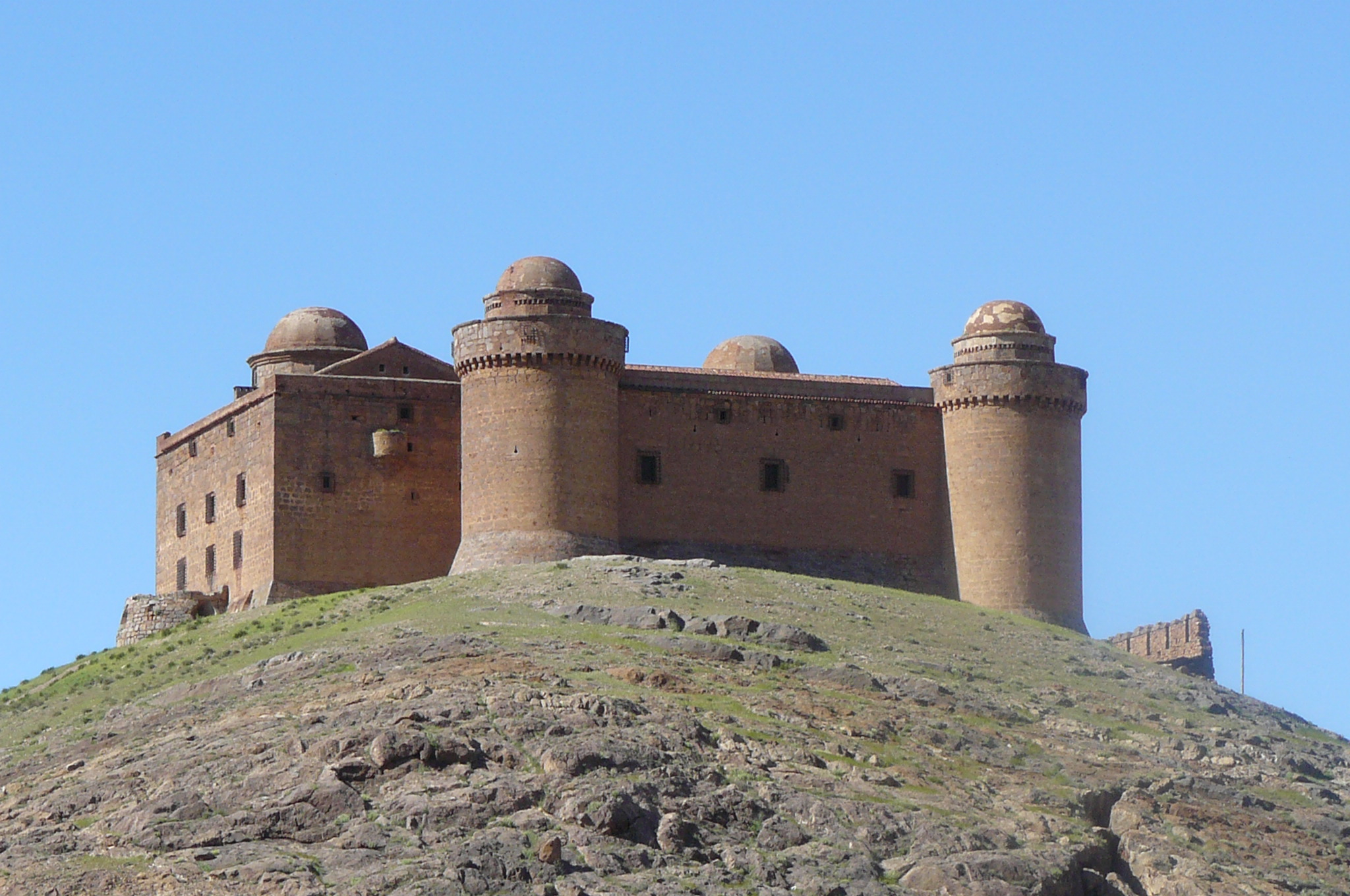
The castle of La Calahorra, at some 50km. from Granada on the roads towards Guadix and Almeria, was designed by Italian architects at the beginnings of the 1500s

One of the young children besides the senior, a sixth child, of famous literary man Iñigo López de Mendoza, (1398–1458), was the Bishop of Calahorra and of Sigüenza since 1473 and later Cardinal of Toledo, the highest ecclesiastical distinction in Spain from a Pope, came to be known as Pedro González de Mendoza, (1428–1495), a.k.a. Cardinal and statesman Cardenal Mendoza. While being a Roman Catholic bishop at Calahorra and therefore supposed not to have a sexual life leading to descendency, he became attached to Doña Mencia de Lemus, a Portuguese lady-in-waiting of the queen. They had two sons, Rodrigo, who was once selected in a list of candidates to be the husband of Lucrezia Borgia, one of the children fathered in Rome by the later Spanish Roman Catholic Pope Alexander VI, and Diego, who was the grandfather of the princess of Eboli of the reign of Philip II (see Antonio Perez) By Inés de Tovar, a lady of a Valladolid family, he had a third son (Juan Hurtado de Mendoza y Tovar) who afterwards emigrated to France.

On the death of King Henry IV of Castile, (1425–1473), on 11 December 1473, the Mendoza family from Guadalajara, who had remained faithful to king Henry, was sought after and much courted by the new 23 years old self-proclaimed Queen of Castile, Isabel I of Castile, (1451–1504), a half sister of king Henry, against the sectors of the nobility wishing to remain faithful to the young daughter of the king, 12 years old Juana la Beltraneja, (1462–1530). Isabel I had married, disregarding the authority, the advice and the political balances thought out by her brother the king, Prince of Aragon, later King of Aragon since 1479, Ferdinand II of Aragon, (1452–1516). The self-proclamation of Isabel was made in Segovia the day after her half-brother died and without even counting at the time with her husband the Aragon Prince.

Civil wars ensued in Castile, the accounts running into many hundreds of books and probably hundreds of thousands of pages since then.

To cut short, the by then Archbishop of Seville, Pedro González de Mendoza, fourth child of poet Iñigo López de Mendoza, was offered by Isabel of Castile to "create new nobility lineages" with his "beautiful children of sin", (the Queen "dixit"), Rodrigo, Diego and their half brother Juan. Rodrigo became Count del Cid, to remember a 400-year-old "ancestor", the famous El Cid from Medieval Castilian History.

The first marquess of Cenete or Zenete, title of 1491, was also awarded by the Catholic Monarchs to Rodrigo Díaz de Vivar y Mendoza, deceased 1523. He built the Castle of La Calahorra, and married twice, first to Leonor de la Cerda y Aragón, deceased around 1497, and later to María de Fonseca y Toledo . His daughter Mencía de Mendoza, Second Marquise, died without issue; his other daughter María, became Third Marquise and married Diego Hurtado de Mendoza, 4th Count of Saldaña, heir to the Duchy of Infantado. Thus the marquisate passed to the House of Infantado, whose members used both titles, alternating each generation between the style "Marquess of Cenete and Duke of Infantado" and "Duke of Infantado and Marquess of Cenete".

The primogeniture of the marquesses included the baronies of Ayora, Alazque, Alberique and Gavarda, places inhabited by moriscos, industrious vassals working very well silks, iron, copper and alums, with Moorish ancestry, in the Kingdom of Valencia, as was Zenete after 1492 with the Conquest of Granada, and the seigneuries of Jadraque, El Castillo del Cid and Alcocer, in Guadalajara.

== See also ==
- es:Castillo de La Calahorra
- Conquest of Granada
- El Cid
- Moriscos
- es:Castillo de La Calahorra (In Spanish Wikipedia)
- es:Rodrigo Díaz de Vivar y Mendoza (In Spanish Wikipedia)
- es:Mencía de Mendoza (In Spanish Wikipedia)
