= Castle of Jadraque =

Castle in Castile-La Mancha, Spain

Coordinates: 40°55′9″N 2°55′59.76″W

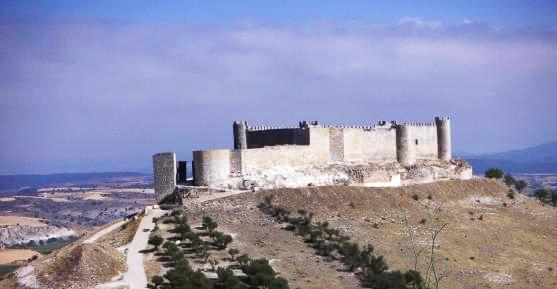
Castle of Jadraque

The Castle of Jadraque (Spanish: Castillo de Jadraque) is a castle in the municipality of Jadraque, Castile-La Mancha, Spain. It sits on a hill commanding the plain of the Henares river. It is sometimes called "Castle of Cid" as it is mentioned in the poem Cantar del Mio Cid.

Built in ashlar stone, it has a rectangular shape with a perimeter of 240 metres. It has four round and one rectangular tower.

Archaeological investigations proved that the site was used since prehistoric times; later it was a fortification of the emirate of Spain and its Moorish descendants. In 1085 it was conquered by the Christians under Alfonso VI of Castile. In 1469 it was bought by cardinal Pedro González de Mendoza.

The current structure dates to the late 15th century, and is attributable to Juan Guas. The only element remaining from the pre-existing castle was a pentagonal tower, which was anyway dismantled later. The castle, used by the Mendoza as a noble residence, was abandoned after the death of Rodrigo Díaz de Vivar y Mendoza. It was used again as a fortress during the War of Spanish Succession and the Peninsular War.
