= Francisco Briceño (bishop) =

Spanish Roman Catholic prelate

Most Reverend Francisco Briceño
- Bishop of Almería
- Church: Catholic Church
- Diocese: Diocese of Almería
- In office: 1571
- Predecessor: Antonio Corrionero de Babilafuente
- Successor: Diego González

Personal details
- Died: 13 May 1571 Almería, Spain

Francisco Briceño, natural de Corral de almagüer. (died 30 Jul 1571) was a Roman Catholic prelate who served as the sixth Bishop of Almería (1571).

== Biography ==
On 5 March 1571, he was selected by the King of Spain and confirmed by Pope Pius V as Bishop of Almería. He served as Bishop of Almería until his death on 30 July 1571.

== See also ==
- Catholic Church in Spain

Catholic Church titles
| Preceded by Antonio Corrionero de Babilafuente | Bishop of Almería; 1571 | Succeeded by Diego González |
