= Diego González (bishop) =

Spanish Roman Catholic prelate

Most Reverend Diego González
- Bishop of Almería
- Church: Catholic Church
- Diocese: Diocese of Almería
- In office: 1572–1587
- Predecessor: Francisco Briceño
- Successor: Juan García

Personal details
- Died: 11 January 1587 Almería, Spain

Diego González (died 11 January 1587) was a Roman Catholic prelate who served as Bishop of Almería (1572–1587).

== Biography ==
On 9 June 1572, Diego González was selected by the King of Spain and confirmed by Pope Gregory XIII as Bishop of Almería. He served as Bishop of Almería until his death on 11 January 1587.

Catholic Church titles
Preceded by Francisco Briceño	Bishop of Almería; 1572–1587	Succeeded by Juan García
