= Convent of Santo Domingo (Valencia) =

- Convento de Santo Domingo
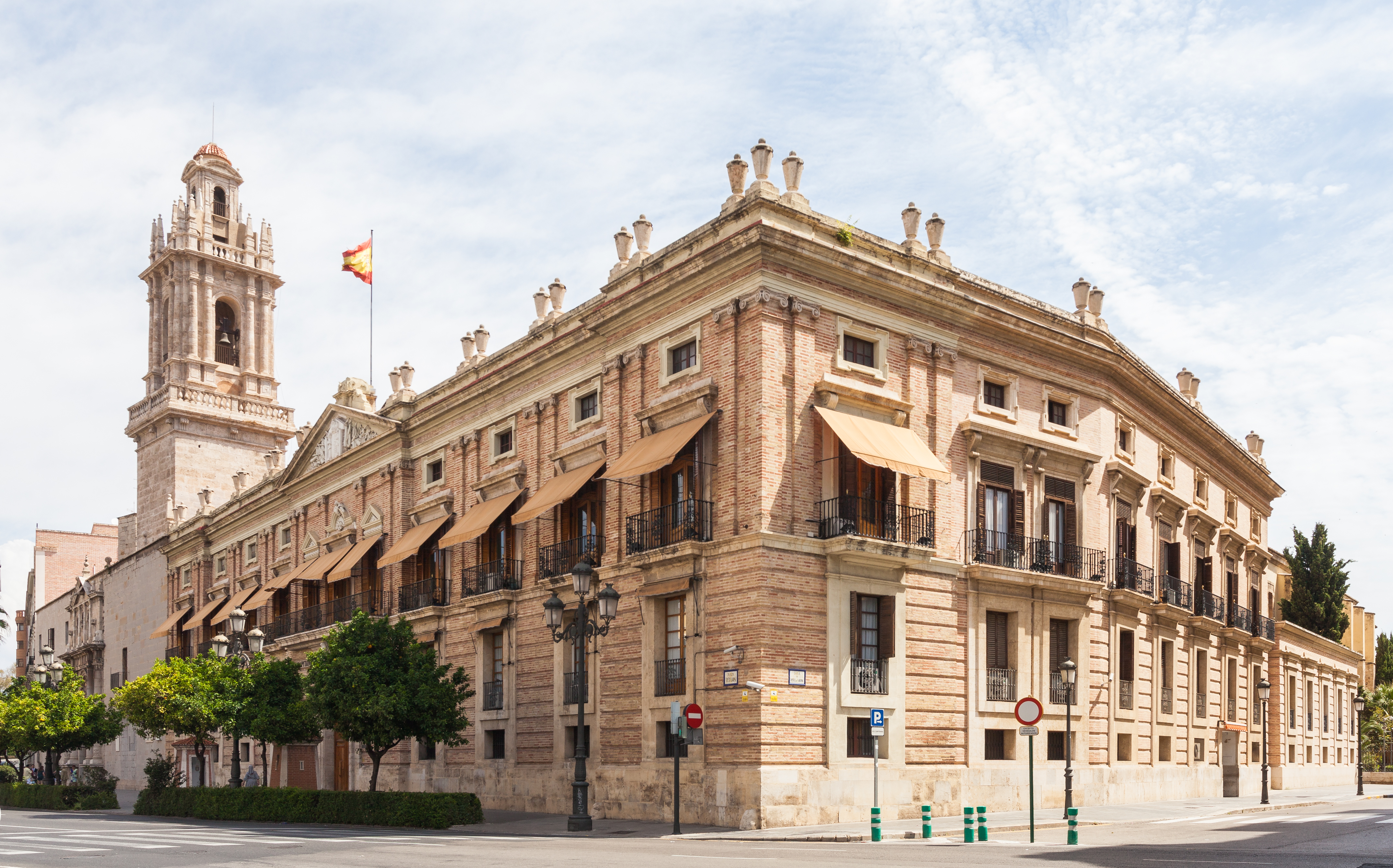
- Convent of Santo Domingo
- Location: Valencia, Spain

History
- Status: Spanish Army headquarters
- Founded: 1239

Architecture
- Heritage designation: Bien de Interés Cultural
- Designated: 1931
- Style: Renaissance, Neoclassical, Valencian Gothic and Baroque

The Convent of Santo Domingo was a convent of the Dominican Order in the city of Valencia, Spain. Construction of the church began on land granted by King James I of Aragon in 1239, but it was subsequently replaced by a larger structure in 1250. The building went through renovations and expansions during different periods in history, hence it is home to Renaissance, Neoclassical, Valencian Gothic and Baroque styles of architecture. It was classified as a Bien de Interés Cultural in 1931, and is now used as a Spanish Army headquarters.

== History and architecture ==
The church was founded in 1239 on land granted by King James I of Aragon. It was replaced by a larger construction in 1250 because of concerns regarding the durability of the original building. Its Gothic cloister, the oldest architectural remains of the church, was built around 1300. It was renovated according to the Occitan Gothic model with a floor plan consisting of a single nave and side chapels in 1382; the remnant of this church that survive is in the form of a spacious temple, the Chapel of Saint Vincent Ferrer built in neoclassical style. It was renovated and extended in the latter half of the 18th century.

King Alfonso V of Aragon ordered the construction of the Chapel of the Kings in 1431, and it was completed in 1463 by King John II of Aragon. The structure remains intact and consists of three sections: the first two oblong, and the one that leads to the hexagonal presbytery. Although the chapel has a rectangular plan, two horns at each angle on the front wall allow a spatial transition.

The Chapel of the Kings is connected to the Chapel of Saint Vincent Ferrer. It also has its own access through the Renaissance cloister; this entrance consists of a pointed portico with a double archivolt on paired columns with a tympanum of the arms of Alfonso V of Aragon. Highlights of this room are its façade which was built in Gothic and Renaissance style, the vaulted roof without ribs and a double helical staircase lacking a stone axis. The staircase communicates with the terrace; it was built in a way to allow two people to go up and down simultaneously without inconveniencing each other. Once the essential parts of the convent were completed, the construction of the entrance patio to the temple and the respective exterior facade were begun. This consisted of an imafronte in the form of an altarpiece divided into two bodies.

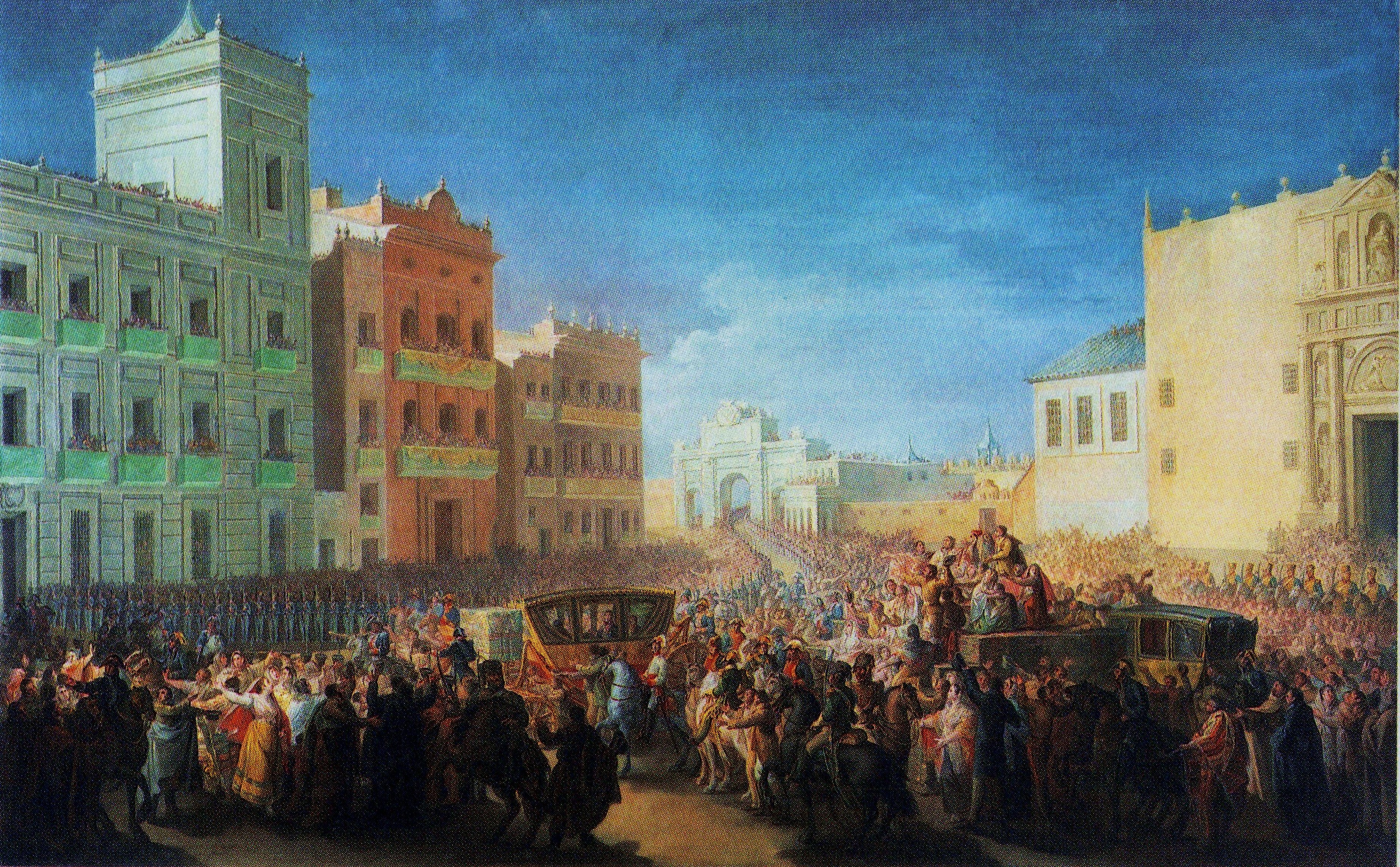
Triumphal Entry of Ferdinand VII into Valencia (1815) by Miguel Parra Abril depicts the façade on the right.

The Chapter Hall in the eastern gallery is a vaulted room that began construction in the 14th century. It constitutes a square room of twelve meters per side whose rib vault rests on four central columns; fasciculated bundles of these columns are effectively prolonged in the shape of a palm tree in the nervices of the vault, producing an effect of weightlessness and lightness of the room. This room is accessed through a pointed arch decorated with openwork tracery similar to that of the large windows, divided by stylized mullions. The refectory or Throne Room used as a reception room, began to be built in 1560 and belongs to the Baroque style.

The main façade of the convent building was constructed at the beginning of the 19th century, which was partially altered when it became assigned to the Captaincy General of Valencia in 1840 by a decree of Baldomero Espartero. The building was classified as a Bien de Interés Cultural in 1931, and is now used as a Spanish Army headquarters.

== Gallery ==
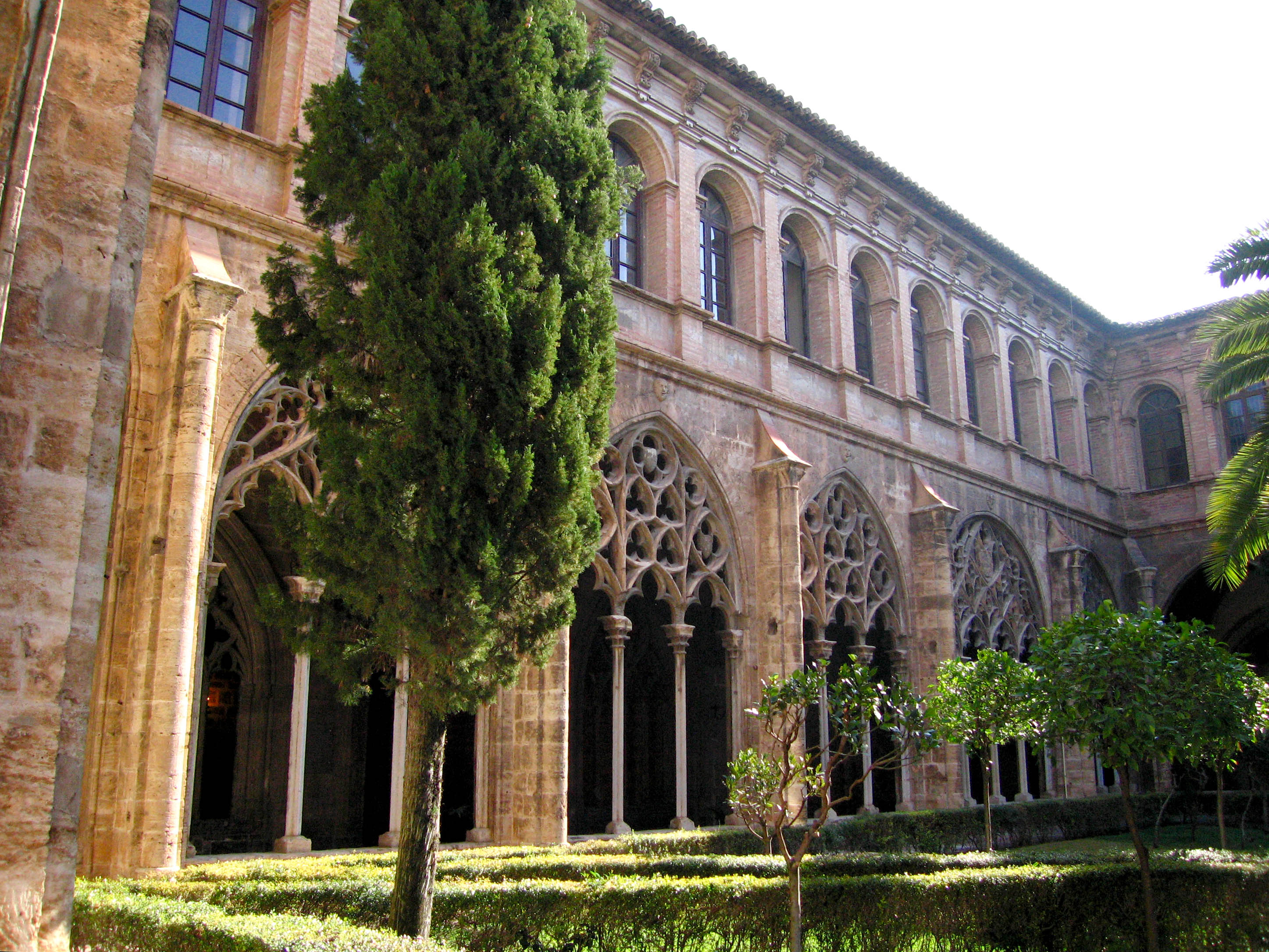
Greater Cloister in Gothic style

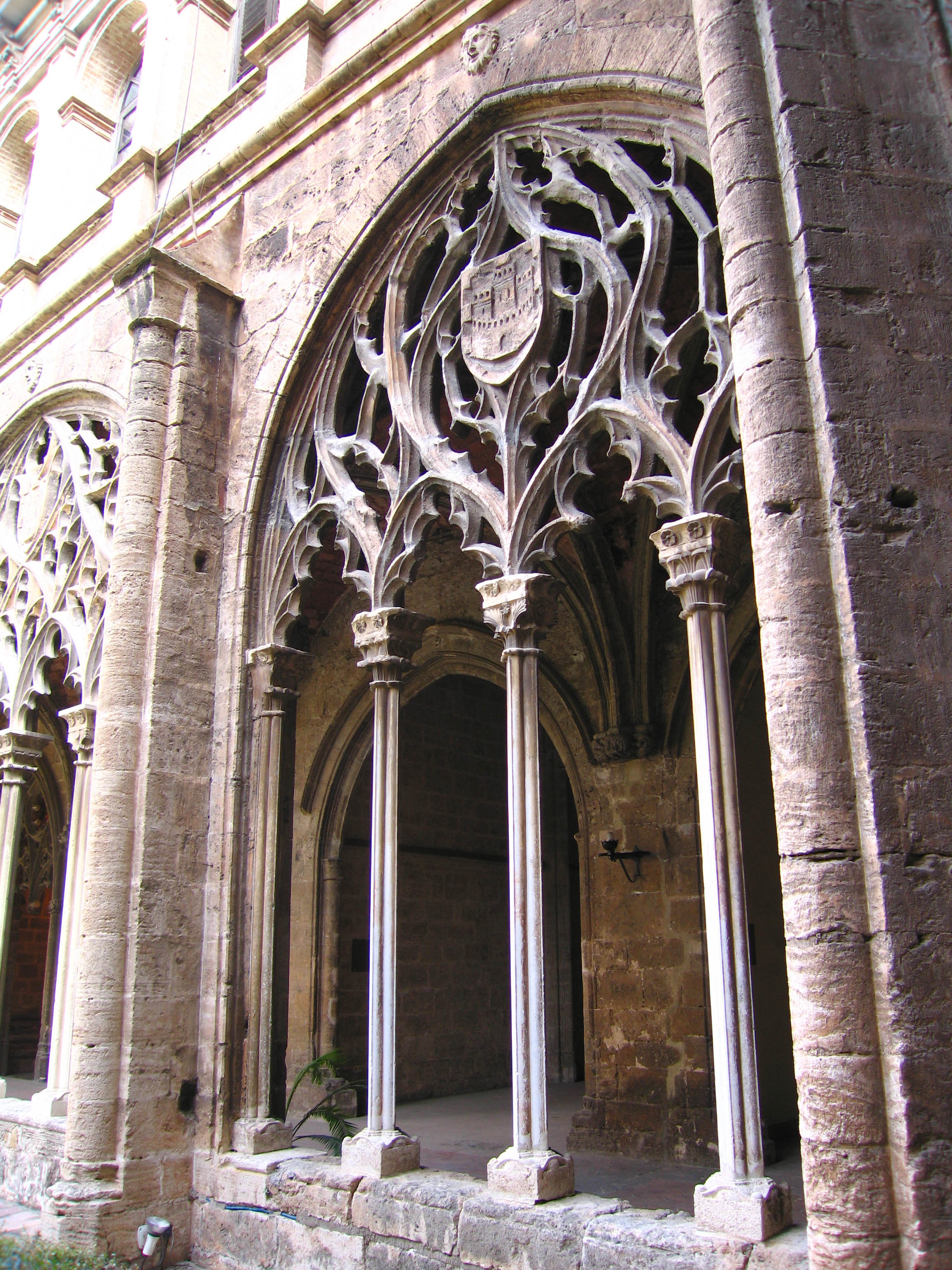
Gothic pillars

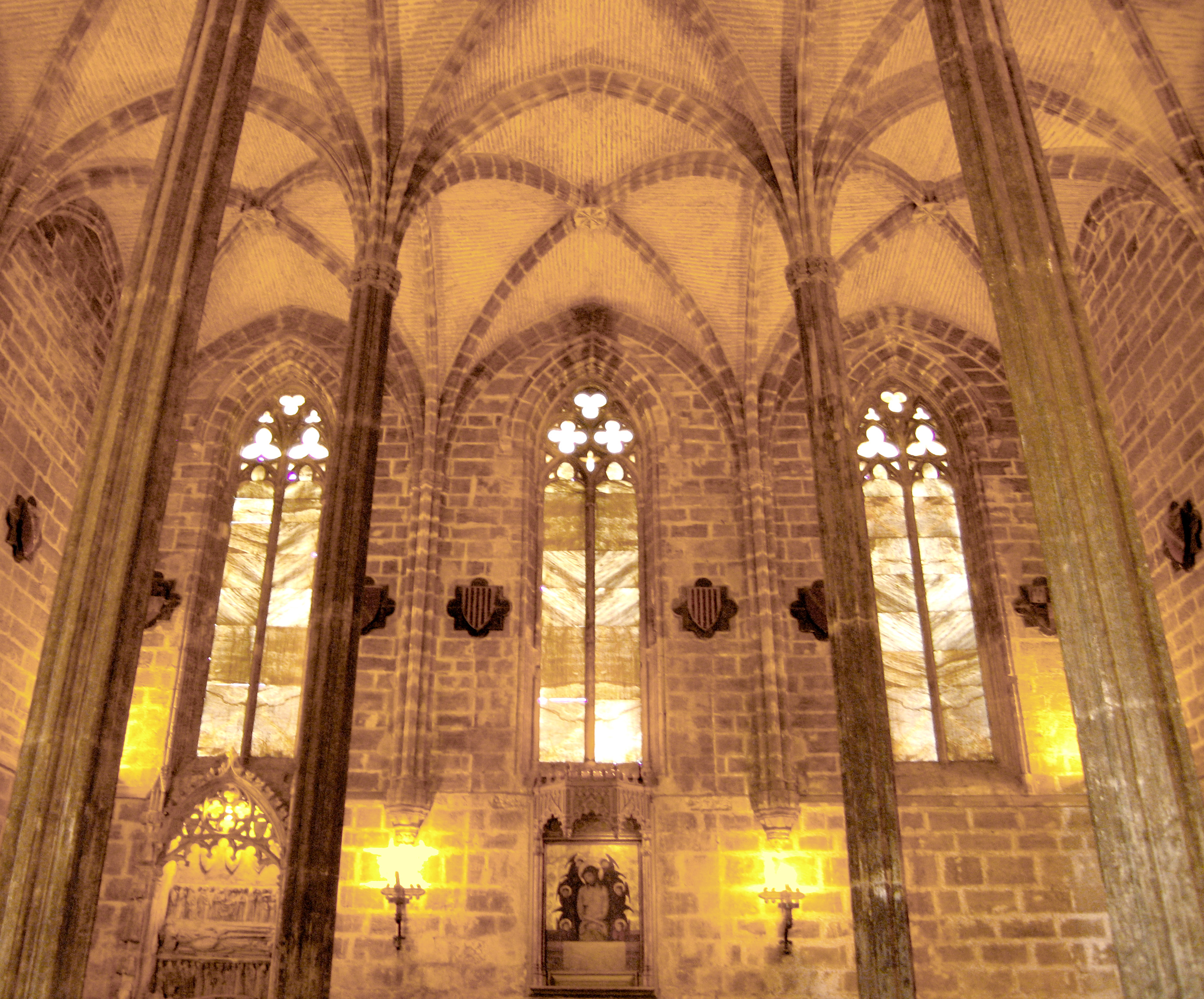
Chapter classroom

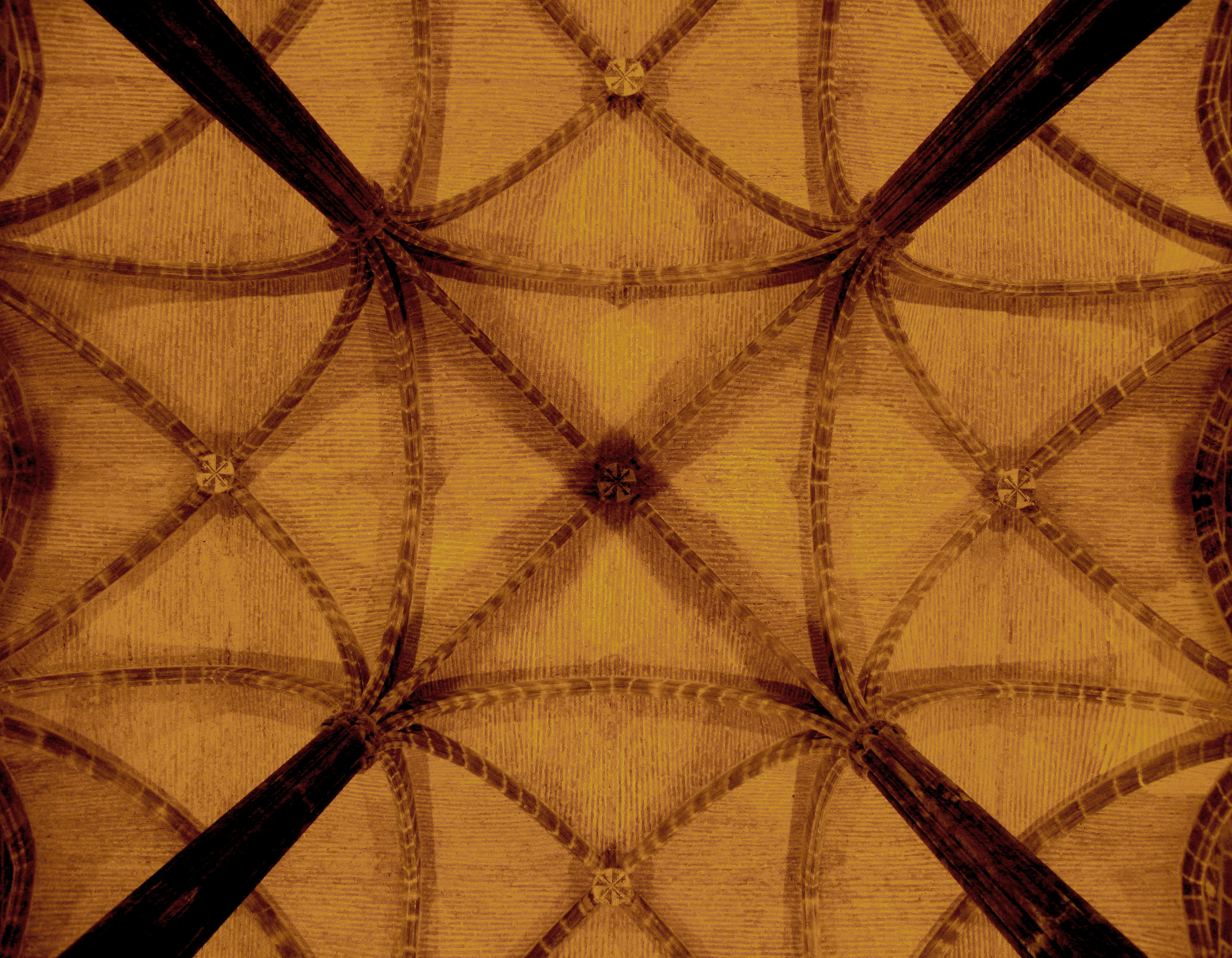
Ceiling of the Chapter Hall.

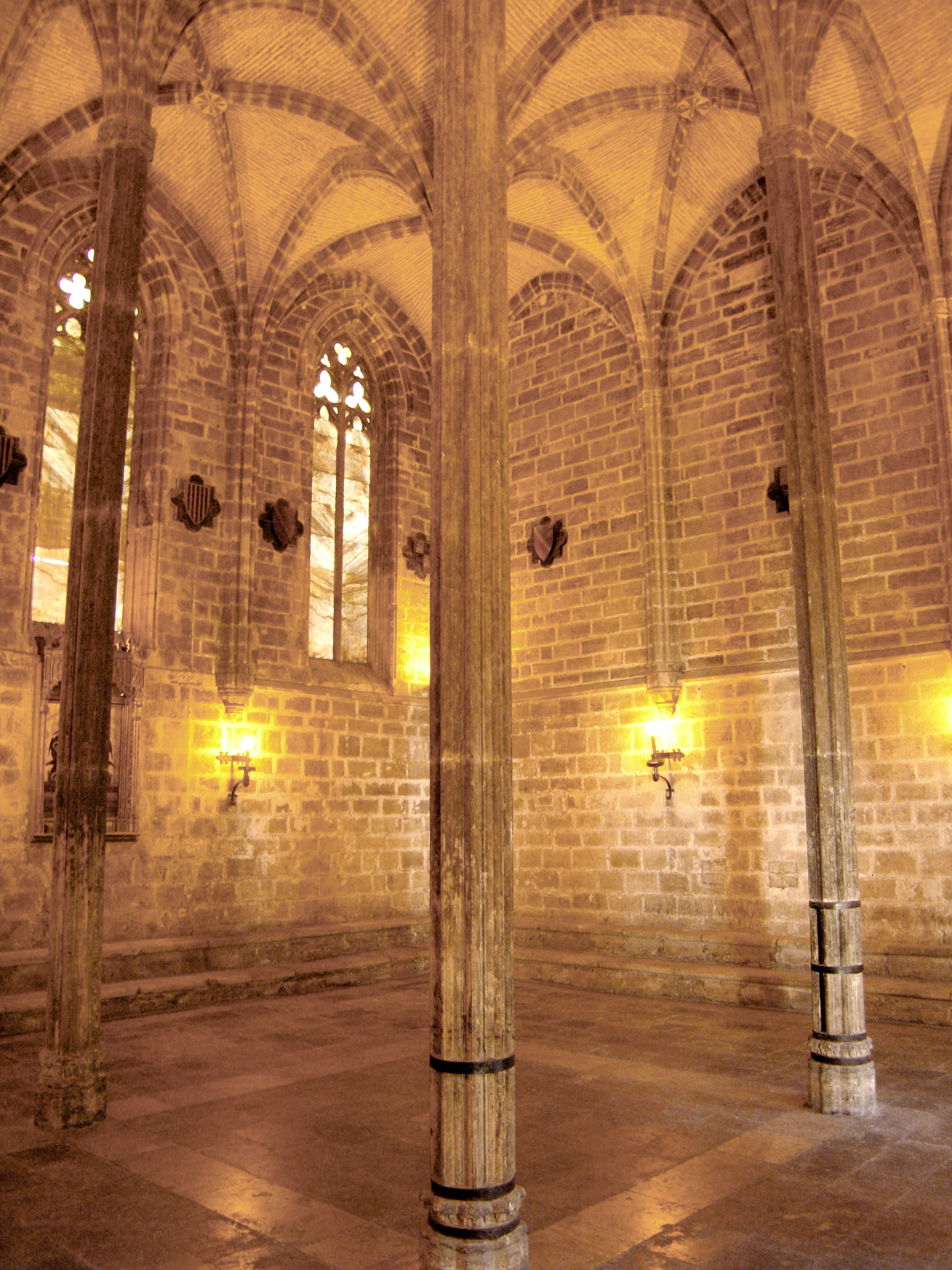
Gothic style pillars and interior

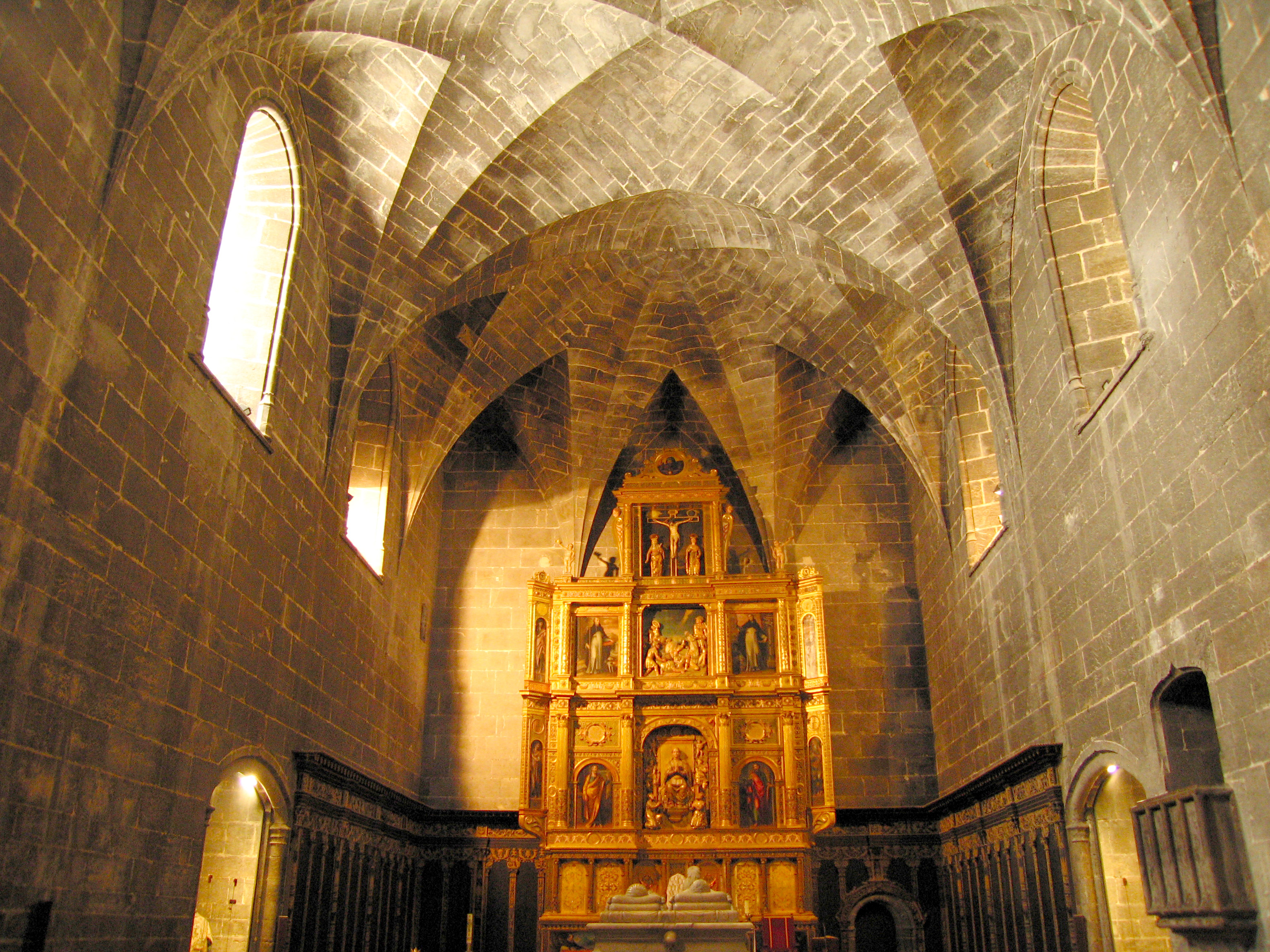
Chapel of the Kings, with the Renaissance altarpiece in the center, the marble tomb in front, and the arches to the right and left

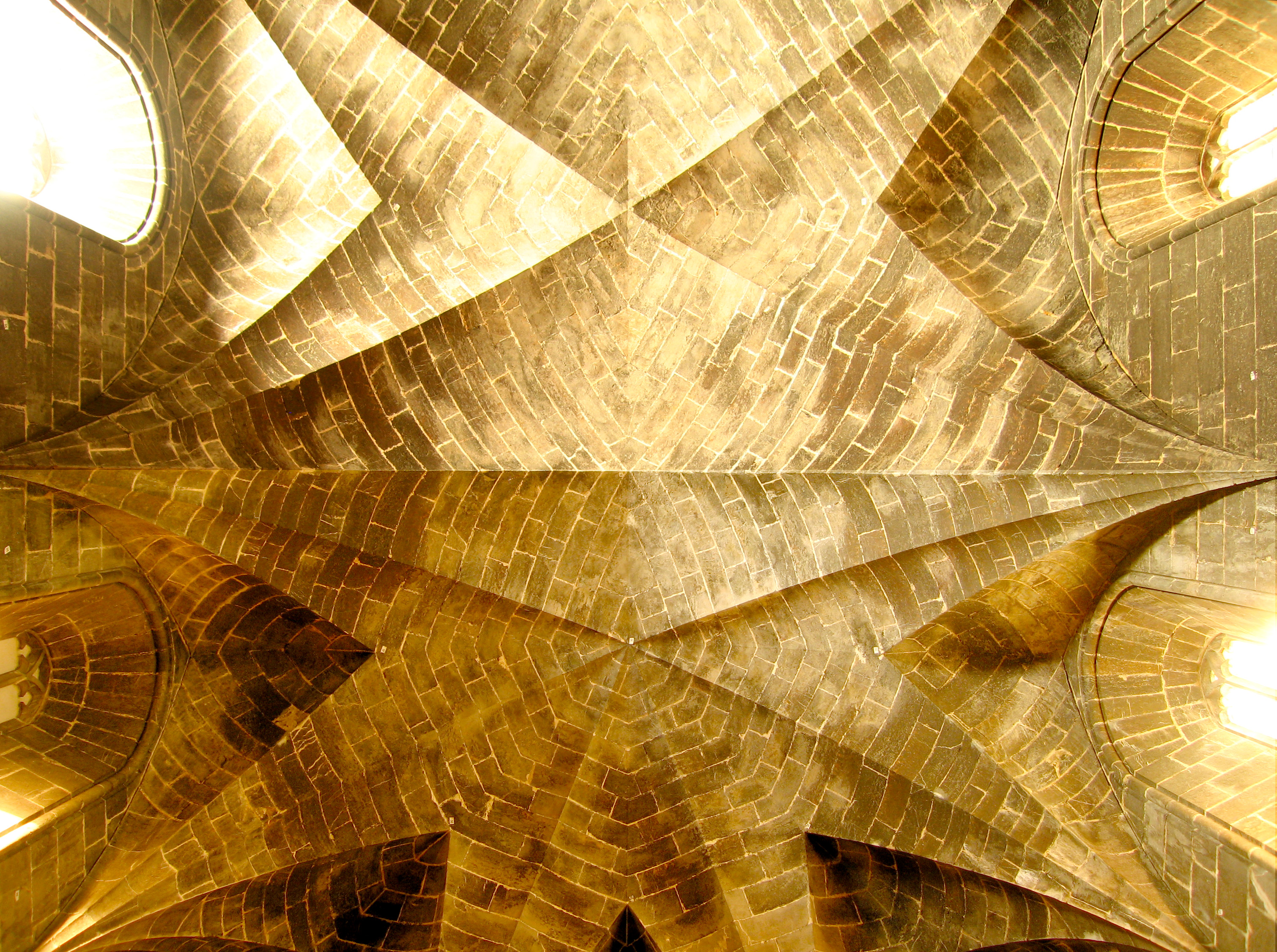
The starry vault without ribs of the Chapel of the Kings

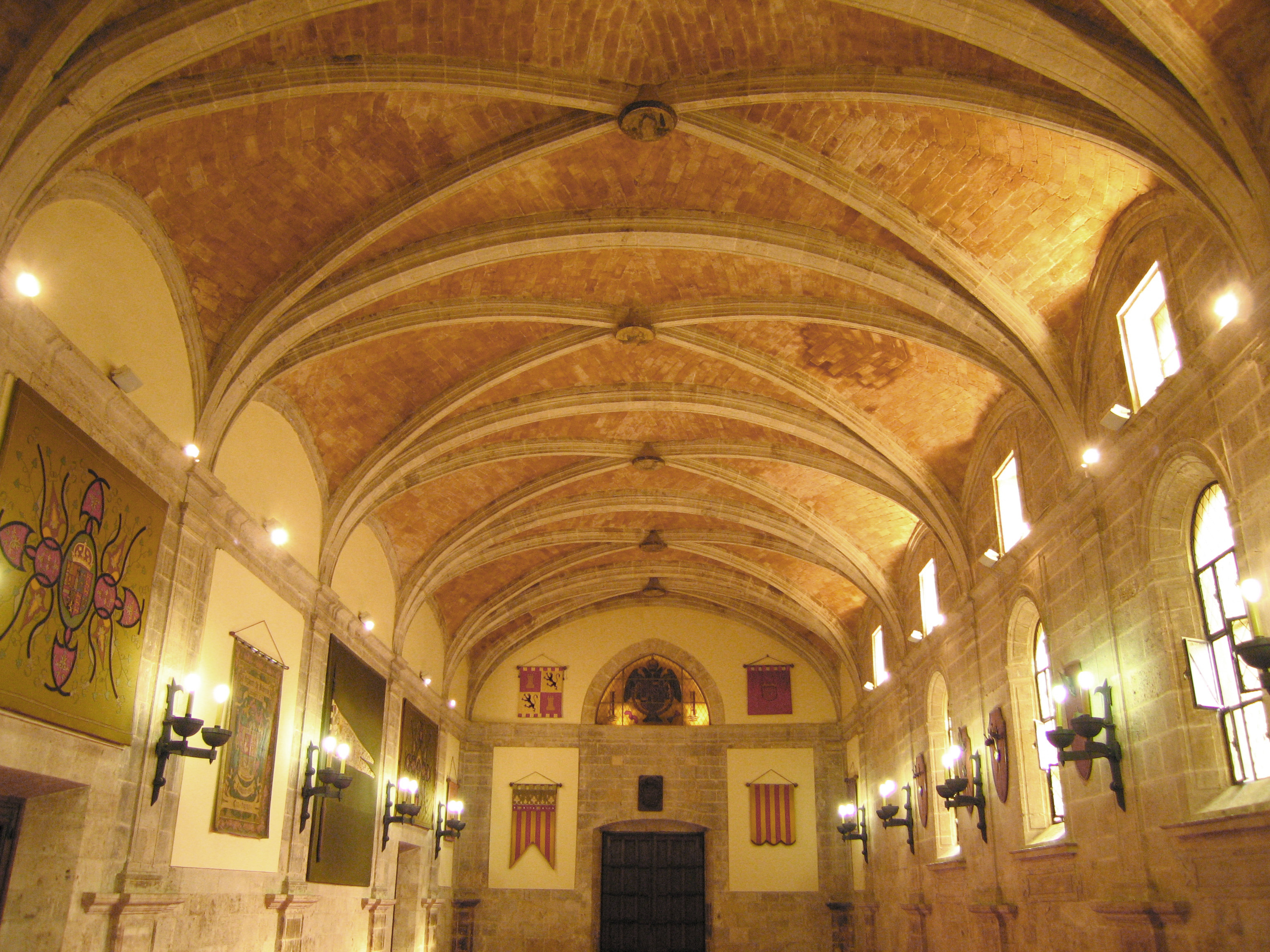
Refectory or Throne Room

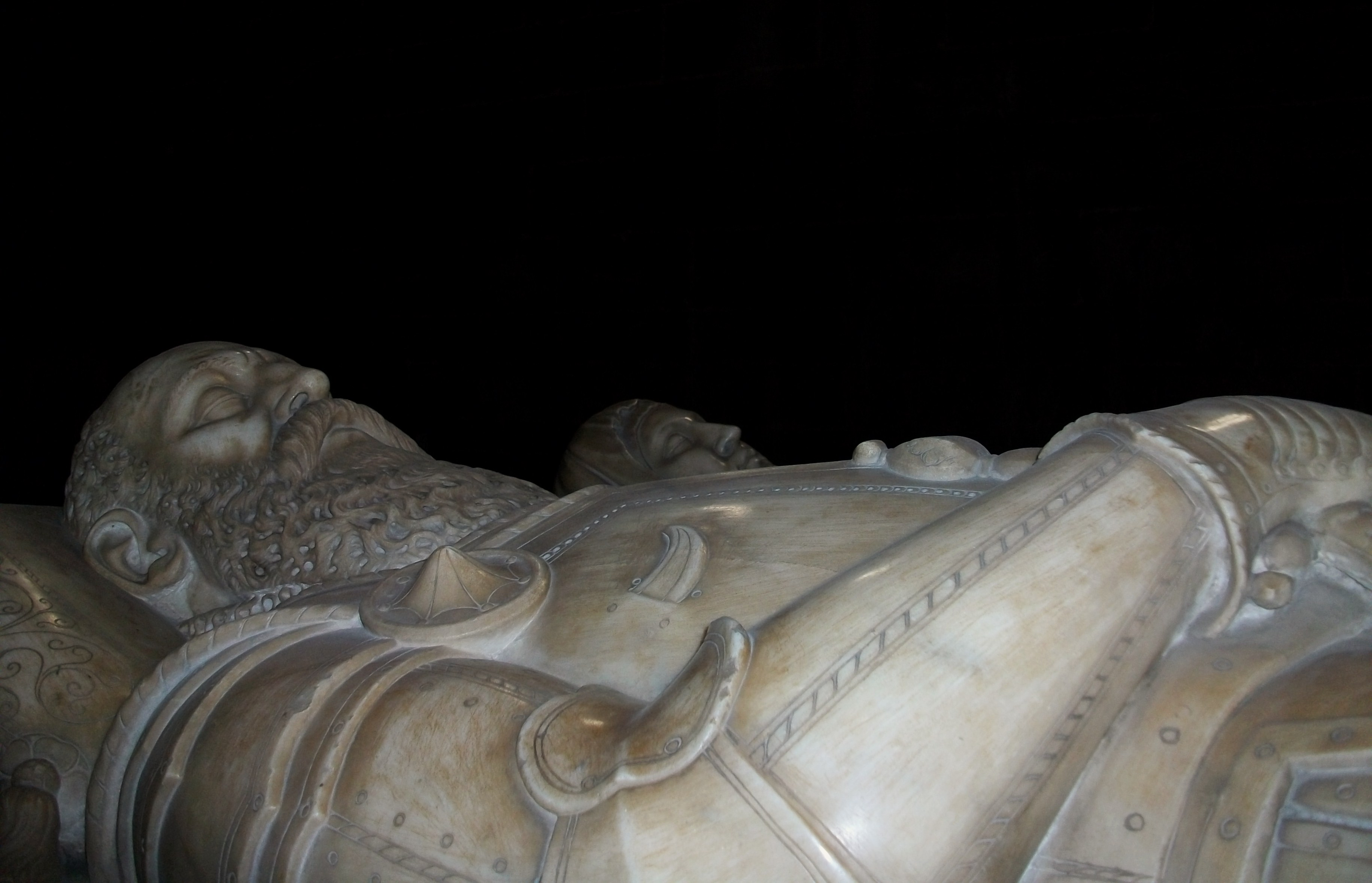
The tomb of the Marquis of Cenete
