= Francisco Sosa (bishop) =

Spanish Catholic bishop

Most Reverend Francisco Sosa
- Bishop of Almería
- Church: Catholic Church
- Diocese: Diocese of Almería
- In office: 1515–1520
- Predecessor: Juan de Ortega
- Successor: Juan González Meneses

Personal details
- Died: 1 July 1520 Almería, Spain

Francisco Sosa (died 1 July 1520) was a Catholic prelate who served as the second Bishop of Almería (1515–1520).

On 1 June 1515, he was selected by the King of Spain and confirmed by Pope Leo X as Bishop of Almería. He served as Bishop of Almería until his death on 1 July 1520.

Catholic Church titles
Preceded by Juan de Ortega	Bishop of Almería; 1515–1520	Succeeded by Juan González Meneses
