= Juan de Ortega (bishop of Almería) =

Spanish Catholic bishop

Most Reverend Juan de Ortega
- Bishop of Almería
- Church: Catholic Church
- Diocese: Diocese of Almería
- In office: 1492–1515
- Predecessor: None
- Successor: Francisco Sosa (bishop)

Personal details
- Died: 1515 Almería, Spain

Juan de Ortega was a Catholic prelate who served as the first Bishop of Almería (1492–1515).

== Biography ==
On 21 May 1492, he was selected by the King of Spain and confirmed by Pope Innocent VIII as Bishop of Almería. He served as Bishop of Almería until his death in 1515.

Catholic Church titles
Preceded by None	Bishop of Almería; 1492–1515	Succeeded by Francisco Sosa
