= Juan García (bishop) =

Spanish Roman Catholic prelate

Most Reverend Juan García
- Bishop of Almería
- Church: Catholic Church
- Diocese: Diocese of Almería
- In office: 1597–1601
- Predecessor: Diego González
- Successor: Juan Portocarrero

Personal details
- Died: 31 December 1601 Almería, Spain

Juan García (died 31 December 1601) was a Roman Catholic prelate who served as Bishop of Almería (1597–1601).

== Biography ==
On 17 August 1597, Juan García was selected by the King of Spain and confirmed by Pope Clement VIII as Bishop of Almería. He served as Bishop of Almería until his death on 31 December 1601.

Catholic Church titles
Preceded by Diego González	Bishop of Almería; 1572–1587	Succeeded by Juan Portocarrero
