= Juan Portocarrero =

Spanish Roman Catholic prelate

Most Reverend Juan Portocarrero
- Bishop of Almería
- Church: Catholic Church
- Diocese: Diocese of Almería
- In office: 1602–1631
- Predecessor: Juan García
- Successor: Antonio Viedma Chaves

Personal details
- Died: 8 March 1631 Almería, Spain

Juan Portocarrero, O.F.M. (died 8 March 1631) was a Spanish Roman Catholic prelate who served as Bishop of Almería (1602–1631).

== Biography ==
Juan Portocarrero was ordained a priest in the Order of Friars Minor. On 26 August 1602, he was selected by the King of Spain and confirmed by Pope Leo XI as Bishop of Almería. He served as Bishop of Almería until his death on 8 March 1631.

While bishop, he was the principal co-consecrator of

- Antonio Corrionero, Bishop of Islas Canarias (1615);
- Juan Zapata Osorio, Bishop of Zamora (1616);
- Enrique Pimentel Zúñiga, Bishop of Valladolid, (1619); and
- Garcerán Albañell, Archbishop of Granada (1621).

Catholic Church titles
Preceded by Juan García	Bishop of Almería; 1602–1631	Succeeded by Antonio Viedma Chaves
