= Juan González Meneses =

Spanish Roman Catholic prelate

Most Reverend Juan González Meneses
- Bishop of Almería
- Church: Catholic Church
- Diocese: Diocese of Almería
- In office: 1520–1521
- Predecessor: Francisco Sosa
- Successor: Diego Fernández de Villalán

Personal details
- Died: 28 June 1521 Almería, Spain

Juan González Meneses (also Don Juan González de Meneses y de la Parra)(died 28 Jun 1521) was a Roman Catholic prelate who served as the Bishop of Almería (1520–1521).

== Biography ==
On 17 September 1520, Juan González Meneses was selected by the King of Spain and confirmed by Pope Leo X as Bishop of Almería. He served as Bishop of Almería until his death on 28 June 1521.

Catholic Church titles
Preceded by Francisco Sosa	Bishop of Almería; 1520–1521	Succeeded by Diego Fernández de Villalán
