= Diego Ventaja Milán =

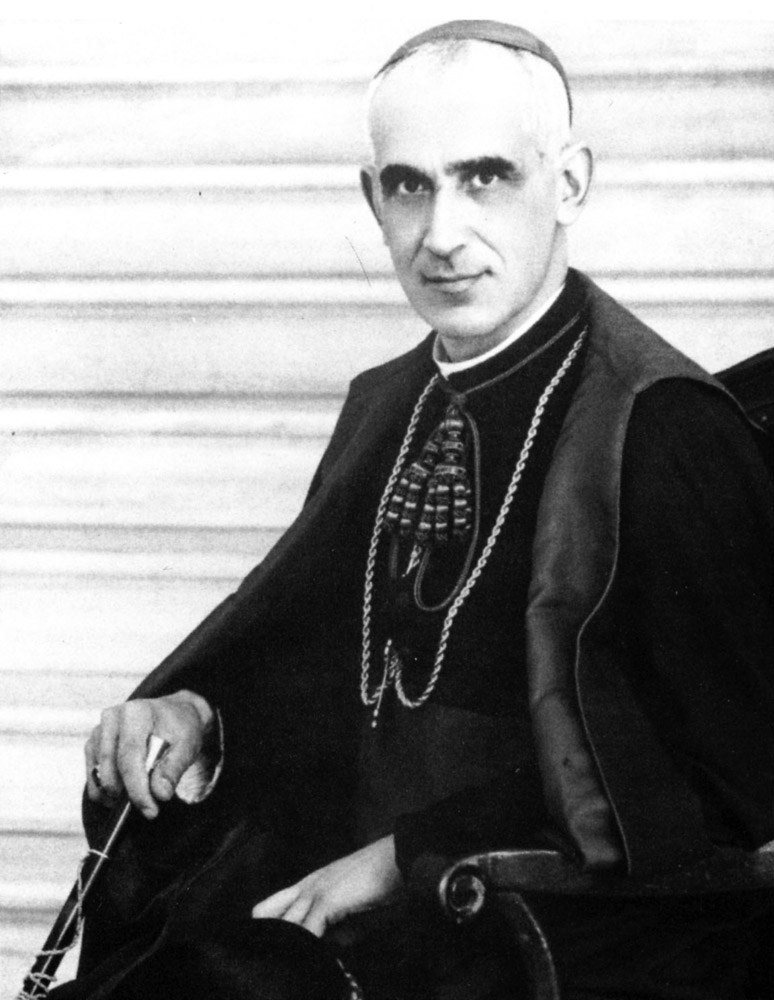
undated photograph

Diego Ventaja Milán (22 Juli 1880 - 31 August 1936) was a Spanish Roman Catholic prelate who served as the Bishop of Almería from his appointment in 1934 until his death. He was shot as a victim of religious persecutions in 1936 and beatified by Pope John Paul II in 1993.

== Life ==
Episcopal arms

Milán received his Doctorate in Philosophy from the Pontifical Gregorian University in 1898. He was ordained a priest by Rafael Merry del Val in 1902.

In 1934, he was appointed Bishop of Almería. After the outbreak of the Spanish civil war, a dozen of churches and monasteries were set on fire in his diocese.

The episcopal palace of Almería was occupied by the 22 July 1936, forcing Milán to leave in order to keep administering his diocese. He refused offers to be evacuated to Gibraltar by ship.

After republican forces had captured him and conscripted him to forced labor, he was shot in the Valley of Chisme with 16 others.

== Veneration ==
He was beatified on the 10 October 1993. His feast day is 31 August, the day of his death.

In 2018, his remains were identified. His skull is buried in the Cathedral of Almería since.
