= Jadraque =

- Municipality
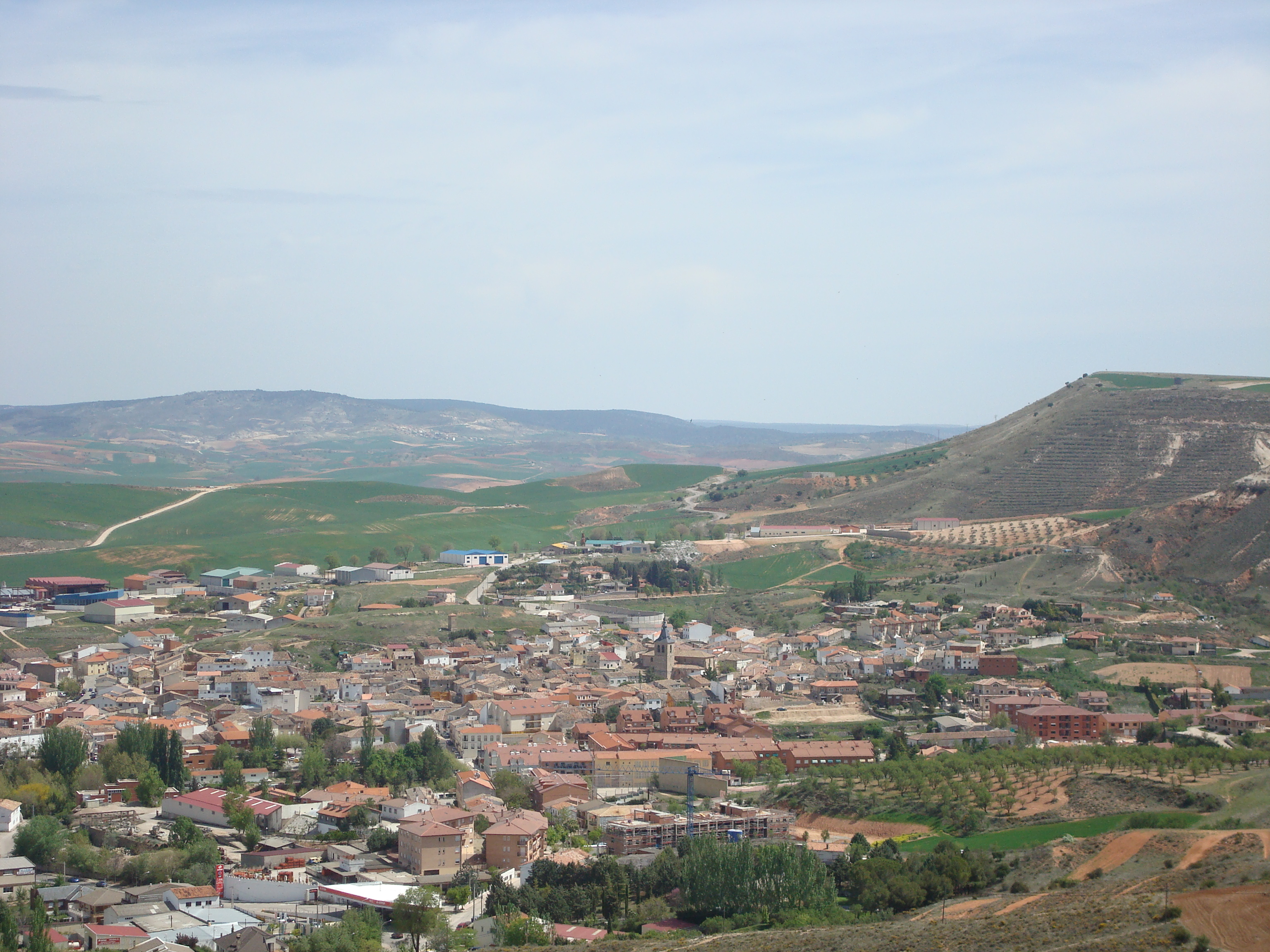
- View from the castle

- Coat of arms

- Location within Castilla-La Mancha Location within Province of Guadalajara Location within Spain
- Coordinates: 40°55′36″N 2°55′25″W
- Country: Spain
- Autonomous community: Castilla–La Mancha
- Province: Guadalajara

Government
  - Mayor: Alberto Domínguez Luis

Area
  - Total: 38.91 km^{2} (15.02 sq mi)
- Elevation: 832 m (2,730 ft)

Population (2025-01-01)
  - Total: 1,522
  - Density: 39.12/km^{2} (101.3/sq mi)
- Demonym: Jadraqueños
- Time zone: UTC+1 (CET)
  - Summer (DST): UTC+2 (CEST)
- Website: Official website

Jadraque is a municipality of Spain located in the province of Guadalajara, Castilla–La Mancha. The municipality spans across a total area of 38.91 km^{2}. As of 1 January 2020, it has a population of 1,370.

== History ==
It is home to a medieval castle, the so-called Castle of Cid. In a barter, Alfonso Carrillo de Acuña transferred the castle of Jadraque to Pedro González de Mendoza in exchange for the town of Maqueda and the mayorship of Toledo on 27 January 1470.

By the early 16th century, the land of Jadraque extended across around 713 km^{2} of the Henares basin (divided into the sexmos of Henares and Bornova).
