= Rodrigo Díaz de Vivar y Mendoza, 1st Marquis of Cenete =

Spanish noble

The Most Illustrious The Marquis of Cenete
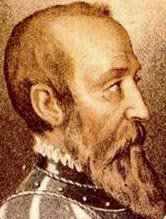
- Born: Rodrigo Díaz de Vivar y Mendoza c. 1466; Guadalajara, Crown of Castile
- Died: 22 February 1523 (aged 56–57); Valencia, Crown of Aragon
- Spouse(s): Leonor de le Cerda (m. 1492; died 1497) María de Fonseca y Toledo (m. 1506; died 1522)
- Children: Mencía de Mendoza; María de Mendoza; Catalina de Mendoza
- Parents: Pedro González de Mendoza; Mencía de Lemos

Coat of arms of the House of Mendoza.

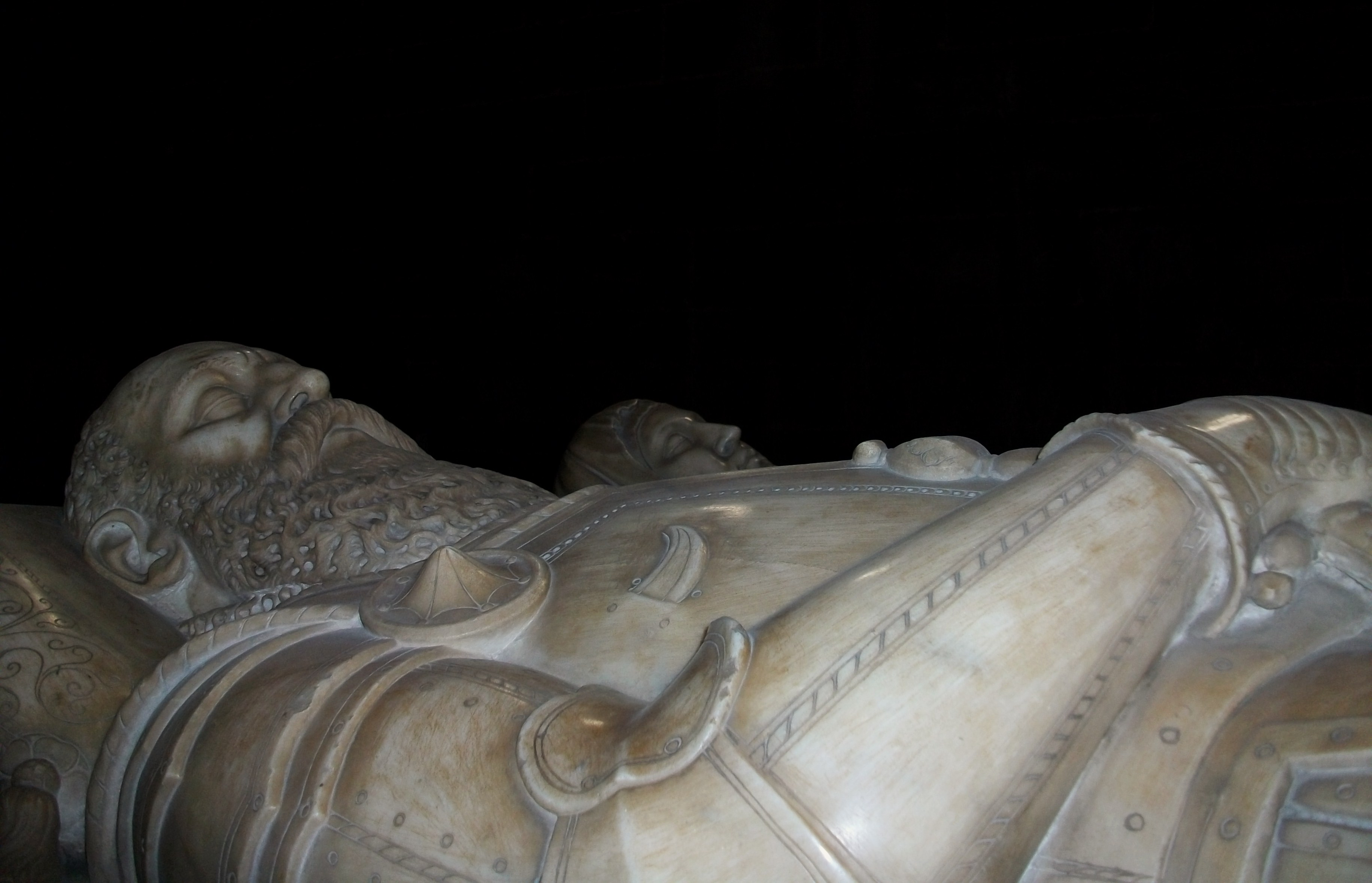
The tomb of the Marquis at the Convent of Santo Domingo in Valencia

Rodrigo Díaz de Vivar y Mendoza, (c. 1466, Guadalajara – February 22, 1523, Valencia) was a Spanish noble of the House of Mendoza. He was the firstborn son of the powerful Cardinal Pedro González de Mendoza and went on to become the 1st Conde del Cid (El Cid) and the 1st Marquis of Cenete, a title he held from 1491 until his death.

== Life ==
Rodrigo was the illegitimate son of Cardinal Pedro González de Mendoza and Mencía de Lemos. He was a member of the powerful House of Mendoza family. Rodrigo was schooled by his father and his uncle Diego Hurtado de Mendoza y Quiñones, and was the brother of Diego Hurtado de Mendoza, 1st Count of Melito.

Rodrigo began his military career in the Granada War under the command of his uncle, Íñigo López de Mendoza y Quiñones, the 2nd Count of Tendilla.

In 1492, Rodrigo married Leonor de le Cerda, daughter of Luis de la Cerda y de la Vega, in a secret wedding. They would go on to live in the Castle of Jadraque which belonged to her family. After her death in 1497, he went to Italy where he became familiar with the architecture of the Italian Renaissance.

After Rodrigo returned to Spain, he married a second time with María de Fonseca y Toledo, ignoring the express wishes of her family and Queen Isabella I of Castile who forbade the marriage. As punishment, he was incarcerated until the death of the queen in 1504.

Upon his release from prison, he commissioned Lorenzo Vázquez de Segovia to build his wife the magnificent Castillo de La Calahorra in the Province of Granada. Before long, he left the palace for his dominions in Ayora in the Province of Valencia due to a confrontation between him and his uncle, Íñigo López de Mendoza y Quiñones. Rodrigo was favored in the dispute by Philip I of Castile and Íñigo by Ferdinand II of Aragon. Rodrigo moved permanently to Valencia after his brother was named Viceroy. He played an active political and military role in the quelling of the Revolt of the Brotherhoods. He there displayed great diplomatic skill which in turn kept him in Valencia even after the death of his brother.

== Issue ==
Rodrigo and María de Fonseca y Toledo had:

- Mencía de Mendoza, (1508–1554), campaigned for women's rights, renowned for her great sensibility and cultural prowess.
- María de Mendoza, (1510-1580), who inherited the titles of Marquis of Cenete and Conde del Cid, married Diego Hurtado de Mendoza, 4th Count of Saldaña, first-born son of Íñigo López de Mendoza, the Duke of the Infantado. The aforementioned titles would pass onto the Dukes of the Infantado.
- Catalina de Mendoza y Fonseca, married to Juan Sancho de Tovar y Velasco, 1st Marquis of Berlanga.

== Sources ==
- Boase, Roger (2017). Secrets of Pinar's Game: Court Ladies and Courtly Verse in Fifteenth-Century Spain. Vol. 2. Brill.
- Macpherson, Ian Richard (2004). Motes Y Glosas in the Cancionero General. Vol. 46. Department of Hispanic Studies, Queen Mary, University of London.
- Nader, Helen (1985). Los Mendoza y el Renacimiento Español. Instituto Provincial de Cultura «Marqués de Santillana», Excma. Diputación de Guadalajara, Guadalajara. ISBN 84-505-3156-X.
- Redondo, Fernando Gomez (2018). "The Cidian Matter in the 15th Century". In Zaderenko, Irene; Montaner, Alberto (eds.). A Companion to the Poema de mio Cid. Brill. pp. 463–496.

Preceded by	Marquis of Cenete; 1491–1523	Succeeded by Diego Hurtado de Mendoza, 4th Count of Saldaña
