= Diego Fernández de Villalán =

Spanish Roman Catholic prelate

Most Reverend Diego Fernández de Villalán
- Bishop of Almería
- Church: Catholic Church
- Diocese: Diocese of Almería
- In office: 1523–1556
- Predecessor: Juan González Meneses
- Successor: Antonio Corrionero de Babilafuente

Personal details
- Died: 7 July 1556 Almería, Spain

Diego Fernández de Villalán (died 7 Jul 1556) was a Roman Catholic prelate who served as the fourth Bishop of Almería (1523–1556).

== Biography ==
Diego Fernández de Villalán was ordained a priest in the Order of Friars Minor. On 17 July 1523, he was selected by the King of Spain and confirmed by Pope Adrian VI as Bishop of Almería. He served as Bishop of Almería until his death on 7 July 1556.

Catholic Church titles
Preceded by Juan González Meneses	Bishop of Almería; 1523–1556	Succeeded by Antonio Corrionero de Babilafuente
