= Antonio Corrionero de Babilafuente =

Fifth Bishop of Almería

Most Reverend Antonio Corrionero de Babilafuente
- Bishop of Almería
- Church: Catholic Church
- Diocese: Diocese of Almería
- In office: 1557–1570
- Predecessor: Diego Fernández de Villalán
- Successor: Francisco Briceño

Personal details
- Died: 13 May 1570 Almería, Spain

Antonio Corrionero de Babilafuente (died 13 May 1570) was a Roman Catholic prelate who served as the fifth Bishop of Almería (1557–1570).

== Biography ==
On 10 Dec 1557, he was selected by the King of Spain and confirmed by Pope Paul IV as Bishop of Almería and consecrated bishop in 1558. He served as Bishop of Almería until his death on 13 May 1570.

Catholic Church titles
Preceded by Diego Fernández de Villalán	Bishop of Almería; 1557–1570	Succeeded by Francisco Briceño
