= Mencía de Mendoza =

Dutch culture patron

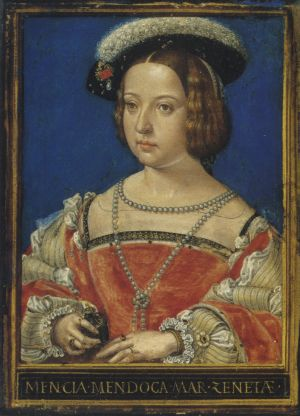
Mencía de Mendoza

Mencía de Mendoza y Fonseca (30 November 1508 – 4 January 1554) was a Dutch culture patron. She was a leading figure of the Renaissance in the Netherlands and known for her progressive opinions of the education of women.

== Life ==
Mencía was the daughter of Rodrigo Díaz de Vivar y Mendoza, 1st Marquis of Cenete and María de Fonseca y Toledo. She married firstly Henry III of Nassau-Breda in 1524, a marriage which was encouraged by the reigning monarch, Charles V, who was actively working on a plan to make the nobility of Spain and the Low Countries mix. Together, they ultimately had one son who was born in March 1527, and would only live a few hours after his birth. Her second marriage was to Ferdinand, Duke of Calabria in 1542. The marriage was Mencía's second, and Ferdinand's third. The couple became renowned for their patronage in literary and artistic works.

== Sources ==
- Perez-Toribio, Montserrat (2011). "From Mother to Daughter: Educational lineage in the Correspondence between the Countess Palamos and Estafania de Requensen". In Cruz, Anne J.; Hernández, Rosilie (eds.). Women's Literacy in Early Modern Spain and the New World. Ashgate.
- Spivakovsky, Erika (1970). Son of the Alhambra: Don Diego Hurtado de Mendoza, 1504-1575. University of Texas Press.
