= Diocese of Almería =

Roman Catholic diocese in Spain

Coordinates: 36.8382°N 2.4674°W

Diocese of Almería Dioecesis Almeriensis Diócesis de Almería

Catholic
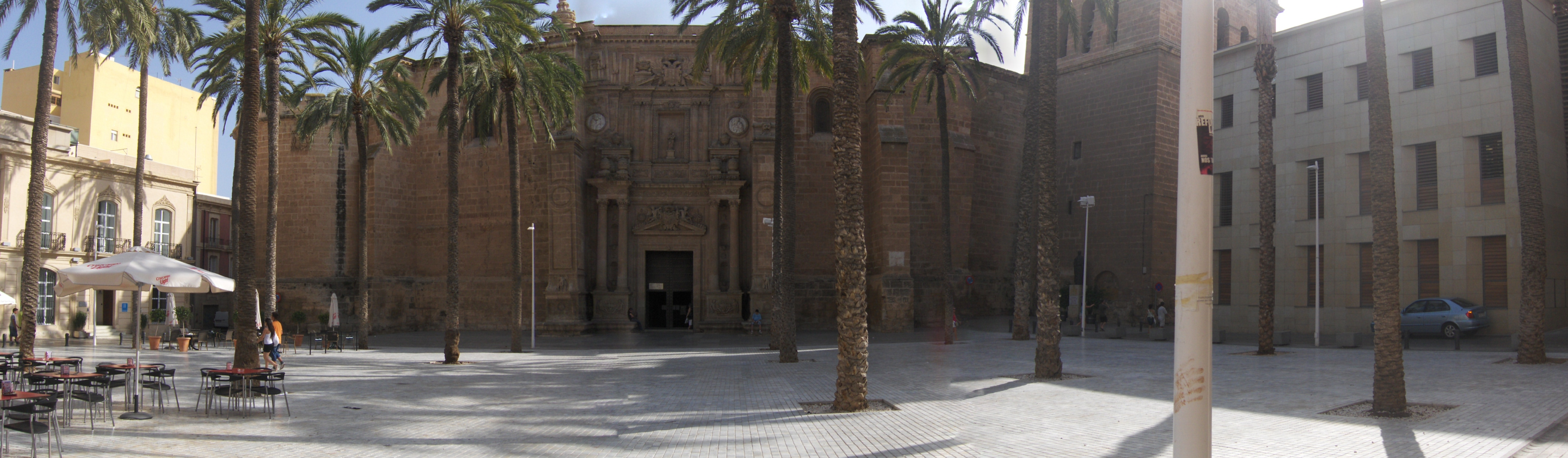
- Almería Cathedral

Location
- Country: Spain
- Ecclesiastical province: Granada
- Metropolitan: Granada

Statistics
- Area: 8,774 km^{2} (3,388 sq mi)
- Population: Total; Catholics: (as of 2006); 702,819; 604,424 (86%)
- Parishes: 213

Information
- Rite: Latin Rite
- Established: 21 May 1492
- Cathedral: Cathedral of Our Lady of Sorrows in Almería

Current leadership
- Pope: Leo XIV
- Bishop: Antonio Gómez Cantero
- Metropolitan Archbishop: Francisco Javier Martínez Fernández

Website
- Website of the Diocese

The Diocese of Almería (Latin: Dioecesis Almeriensis) is a Latin Church diocese of the Catholic Church located in the city of Almería in the ecclesiastical province of Granada in Spain.

== History ==
- May 21, 1492: Established as Diocese of Almería from the Titular Episcopal See of Vergi

== Special churches ==
- Minor Basilicas:
  - Basílica de Nuestra Señora de las Mercedes, Oria, Almería, Andalucía

== Leadership ==
Bishops of Almería (Roman rite)

- Juan de Ortega (21 May 1492 – 1515 Died)
- Francisco Sosa (1 Jun 1515 – 1 Jul 1520 Died)
- Juan González Meneses (17 Sep 1520 – 28 Jun 1521 Died)
- Diego Fernández de Villalán, OFM (17 Jul 1523 – 7 Jul 1556 Died)
- Antonio Corrionero de Babilafuente (10 Dec 1557 – 13 May 1570 Died)
- Francisco Briceño (5 Mar 1571 – 30 Jul 1571 Died)
- Diego González (9 Jun 1572 – 11 Jan 1587 Died)
- Juan García (17 Aug 1597 – 31 Dec 1601 Died)
- Juan Portocarrero, OFM (26 Aug 1602 – 8 Mar 1631 Died)
- Antonio Viedma Chaves, OP (8 Mar 1631 – 9 Jun 1631 Died)
- Martín García Ceniceros (2 Aug 1632 – Oct 1632 Died)
- Bartolomé Santos de Risoba (6 Jun 1633 – 26 Sep 1633 Appointed, Bishop of León)
- Antonio González Acevedo (19 Dec 1633 – 5 Oct 1637 Appointed, Bishop of Coria)
- José Valle de la Cerda, OSB (19 Nov 1637 – 17 Dec 1640 Confirmed, Bishop of Badajoz)
- José de Argáiz Pérez (1 Jul 1641 – 4 Dec 1645 Appointed, Bishop of Ávila)
- Luis Venegas Figueroa (5 Feb 1646 – 30 May 1651 Died)
- Alfonso de Sanvítores de la Portilla, OSB (28 Oct 1651 – 1 Sep 1653 Appointed, Bishop of Orense)
- Enrique Peralta y Cárdenas (26 Jan 1654 – 13 Jan 1659 Confirmed, Bishop of Palencia)
- Alfonso Pérez de Humanares, OCist (9 Jun 1659 – 12 Feb 1663 Appointed, Bishop of Cádiz)
- Rodrigo de Mandia y Parga (9 Apr 1663 – 12 Dec 1672 Appointed, Bishop of Astorga)
- Francisco Antonio Sarmiento de Luna y Enríquez, OSA (25 Sep 1673 – 27 May 1675 Appointed, Bishop of Coria)
- Antonio Ibarra (15 Jul 1675 – 18 Nov 1680 Appointed, Bishop of Cádiz)
- Juan Grande Santos de San Pedro (13 Jan 1681 – 15 Nov 1683 Appointed, Bishop of Pamplona)
- Andrés de La Moneda Cañas y Silva, OSB (20 Dec 1683 – 13 Mar 1687 Died)
- Domingo de Orueta y Caceaga (10 Nov 1687 – 4 Mar 1701 Died)
- Juan Leyva (8 Aug 1701 – 15 Mar 1704 Died)
- Juan Bonilla Vargas, OSsT (15 Dec 1704 – 11 Apr 1707 Appointed, Bishop of Córdoba)
- Manuel de Santo Tomás y Mendoza, OP (7 Jun 1707 – 11 Dec 1713 Confirmed, Bishop of Malaga)
- Jerónimo del Valle Ledesma (21 Mar 1714 – 12 Nov 1722 Died)
- José Pereto Ricarte, OdeM (12 Apr 1723 – 28 Mar 1730 Died)
- José Marín y Ibáñez (22 Nov 1730 – 8 Jan 1734 Died)
- Diego Felipe de Perea Magdaleno (17 Jan 1735 – 29 May 1741 Appointed, Archbishop of Burgos)
- Gaspar de Molina y Rocha, OSA (29 May 1741 – 4 Dec 1760 Died)
- Claudio Sanz Torres y Ruiz Castañedo (13 Jul 1761 – 15 Jul 1779 Died)
- Anselmo Rodríguez Merino, OSB (18 Sep 1780 – 14 Jan 1798 Died)
- Juan Antonio Viana, OCD (14 Aug 1798 – 28 Jan 1800 Died)
- Francisco Javier Mier y Campillo (24 May 1802 – 16 Dec 1815 Resigned)
- Antonio Pérez Minayo (16 Mar 1818 – 29 Aug 1833 Died)
- Anacleto Meoro Sánchez (17 Dec 1847 – 2 Jan 1864 Died)
- Andrés Rosales y Muñoz (22 Sep 1864 – 10 Oct 1872 Died)
- José María Orberá y Carrión (23 Sep 1875 – 23 Nov 1886 Died)
- Santos Zárate y Martínez (17 Mar 1887 – 7 Aug 1906 Died)
- Vicente Casanova y Marzol (19 Dec 1907 – 7 Mar 1921 Appointed, Archbishop of Granada)
- Bernardo Martínez y Noval, OSA (18 Jul 1921 – 24 Jun 1934 Died)
- Blessed Diego Ventaja Milán (1 May 1935 – 30 Aug 1936 Killed)
- Enrique Delgado y Gómez (10 Jun 1943 – 26 Oct 1946 Appointed, Bishop of Pamplona)
- Alfonso Ródenas García (24 Apr 1947 – 7 Nov 1965 Died)
- Ángel Suquía Goicoechea (17 May 1966 – 28 Nov 1969 Appointed, Bishop of Malaga)
- Manuel Casares Hervás (6 Apr 1970 – 12 May 1989 Resigned)
- Rosendo Álvarez Gastón (12 May 1989 – 15 Apr 2002 Retired)
- Adolfo González Montes (15 Apr 2002 – 30 Nov 2021 Retired)
- Antonio Gómez Cantero (30 Nov 2021 – present)

== See also ==
- Roman Catholicism in Spain

== Sources ==
- GCatholic.org
- Catholic Hierarchy
- Diocese website
