= Babilafuente =

- Municipality
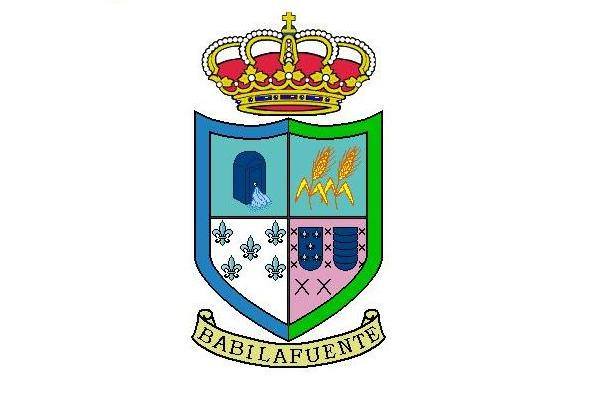
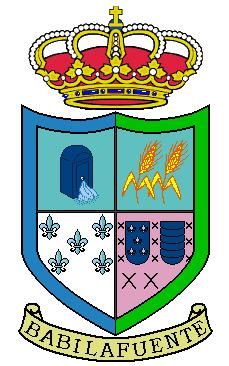
- Flag Coat of arms

- Location in Spain
- Coordinates: 40°58′00″N 5°25′00″W
- Country: Spain
- Autonomous community: Castile and León
- Province: Salamanca
- Comarca: Las Villas

Government
  - Mayor: Jacinto Manuel Palomero Palomero (People's Party)

Area
  - Total: 23 km^{2} (8.9 sq mi)
- Elevation: 801 m (2,628 ft)

Population (2025-01-01)
  - Total: 924
  - Density: 40/km^{2} (100/sq mi)
- Time zone: UTC+1 (CET)
  - Summer (DST): UTC+2 (CEST)
- Postal code: 37330

Babilafuente is a village and municipality in the province of Salamanca, western Spain, part of the autonomous community of Castile and León. It is located 22 kilometres (14 mi) from the city of Salamanca and has a population of 877 people. The municipality covers an area of 23 km^{2} (8.9 sq mi).

The village lies 801 metres (2,628 ft) above sea level.

The postal code is 37330.
