= Pedro González de Mendoza =

Spanish cardinal and statesman (1428-1495)

His Eminence Pedro González de Mendoza
- Cardinal, Archbishop of Toledo; Primate of Spain
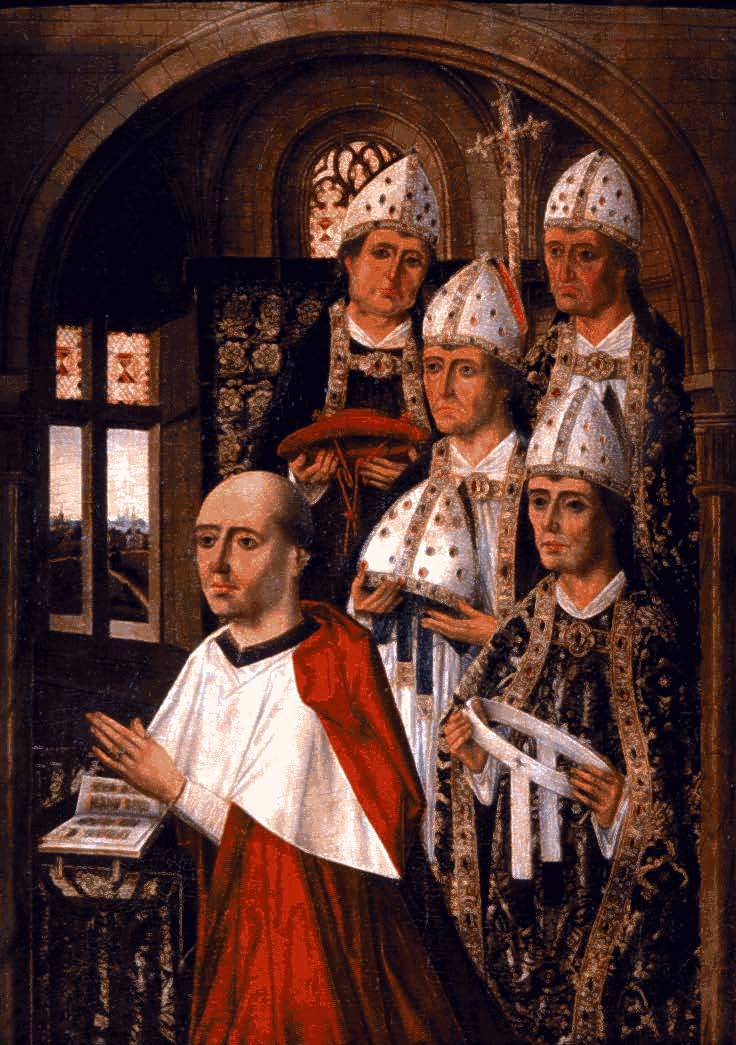
- Portrait of Cardinal Mendoza by Juan Rodríguez de Segovia (c. 1484).
- Church: Roman Catholic
- Archdiocese: Toledo
- Appointed: 13 November 1482
- Term ended: 11 January 1495
- Predecessor: Alfonso Carrillo de Acuña
- Successor: Francisco Jiménez de Cisneros
- Other posts: Titular Patriarch of Alexandria (1482–95); Cardinal-Priest of Santa Croce in Gerusalemme (1478–95); Bishop of Sigüenza (1467–95)
- Previous posts: Archbishop of Seville (1474–82); Cardinal-Priest of Santa Maria in Domnica (1473–78); Bishop of Calahorra y La Calzada (1453–67)

Orders
- Consecration: 21 July 1454
- Created cardinal: 7 May 1473 by Pope Sixtus IV
- Rank: Cardinal-Priest

Personal details
- Born: 3 May 1428 Guadalajara, Crown of Castile
- Died: 11 January 1495 (aged 66) Guadalajara, Crown of Castile
- Parents: Íñigo López de Mendoza; Catalina Suarez de Figueroa

Pedro González de Mendoza (3 May 1428 – 11 January 1495) was a Spanish cardinal, soldier, statesman and lawyer. He served on the council of King Henry IV of Castile and in 1467 fought for him at the Second Battle of Olmedo. In 1468 he was named bishop of Sigüenza and in 1473 he became cardinal and archbishop of Seville and appointed chancellor of Castile.

In the subsequent succession dispute, Mendoza supported Isabel's right to succeed her brother, Enrique IV, and participated in the battle of Toro, where the forces of Ferdinand and Isabella defeated the supporters of Juana la Beltraneja. Mendoza's Castilian chancellorship was reconfirmed by Isabel, and in 1482 he became cardinal-archbishop of Toledo and Primate of Spain. He presided over the royal council for 20 years and his influence was such that he was called "the Third King" during the reign of Isabel and Ferdinand.

== Biography ==
Pedro González de Mendoza was born on 3 May 1428 at Guadalajara in New Castile. He was the fifth son of Íñigo López de Mendoza and Catalina Suarez de Figueroa. The Mendoza family was the most powerful noble family in Spain at the time.

González de Mendoza remained in Guadalajara until 1442 when he was sent to Toledo to continue his education under the auspices of Archbishop Gutierre Álvarez de Toledo. In Toledo he studied rhetoric, history and Latin. While still a teenager he was granted several ecclesiastical benefices, including the parish of Santa María in the town of Hita and the archdeacon of Guadalajara. When the archbishop died in 1446, he moved to the University of Salamanca, where he studied civil and canon law and earned doctorates in both by 1452.

In 1452 he joined the court of Juan II of Castile as a member of the Royal Chapel. As a result of his influential family and status as chaplain to the king, Mendoza was soon appointed to his first bishopric: in 1453 he was selected by Juan II to become Bishop of Calahorra. The pope later confirmed his election and Mendoza was consecrated in 1454 by Alfonso Carrillo de Acuña, the Archbishop of Toledo.

As Bishop of Calahorra he was also señor, or civil and military ruler, of the town and its dependent district. In his secular capacity he led the levies of Calahorra in the civil wars of the reign of Henry IV. He fought for the king at the second battle of Olmedo on 20 August 1467 and was wounded in the arm.

During these years he became attached to Mencia de Lemos, a Portuguese lady-in-waiting of the Consort queen. They had two sons, Rodrigo Diaz de Vivar Mendoza, who was once selected to be the husband of Lucrezia Borgia, and Diego Hurtado de Mendoza, 1st Count of Melito who became the grandfather of the princess of Eboli of the reign of Philip II of Spain (see Antonio Perez).

By Inés de Tovar, a lady of a Valladolid family, he had a third son (Juan Hurtado de Mendoza y Tovar) who afterwards emigrated to France.

In 1467 Pedro became Bishop of Sigüenza. In 1473 he was created cardinal, was promoted to the Archdiocese of Seville and named chancellor of Castile. During the last years of the reign of King Henry IV, he was the partisan of the Princess Isabella, afterwards queen, while his eldest brother Diego Hurtado de Mendoza, 2nd marquis of Santillana, remained however faithful to king Henry IV of Castile, till his death in December 1474.

Pedro, the cadet brother, fought for her at the Battle of Toro on 1 March 1476, when King Henry IV had died already. He had a prominent part in placing her on the throne; and served her indefatigably in her efforts to suppress the disorderly nobles of Castile. In 1482 he became Archbishop of Toledo.

When his oldest brother and head of the whole family, Diego, swore allegiance to Princess Isabella after Henry's death in December 1474, he was duly rewarded by Queen Isabella I of Castile, awarding Diego the title of Duke of the Infantado on 22 July 1475. The title would be awarded the Grandee of Spain in 1519 by king Charles I of Spain.

During the conquest of Granada, Pedro contributed largely to the maintenance of the army. On 2 January 1492, he occupied the town in the name of the Catholic sovereigns. Though his life was worldly, and though he was more soldier and statesman than priest, the "Great Cardinal", as he was commonly called, did not neglect his duty as a bishop. He used his influence with the queen and also at Rome to arrange a settlement of the disputes between the Spanish sovereigns and the papacy. He was also an advocate of Christopher Columbus.

Though he maintained a splendid household as archbishop of Toledo, and, provided handsomely for his children, he devoted part of his revenue to charity, and with a part he endowed the Palacio de Santa Cruz for a college of Valladolid University. His health broke down at the close of 1493.

Queen Isabella visited and nursed him on his deathbed in Guadalajara. It is said that he recommended her to choose as his successor the Franciscan Jimenez de Cisneros, a man who had no likeness to himself save in political faculty and devotion to the authority of the Crown.
