= Mancomunidad de Municipios Marquesado del Zenete =

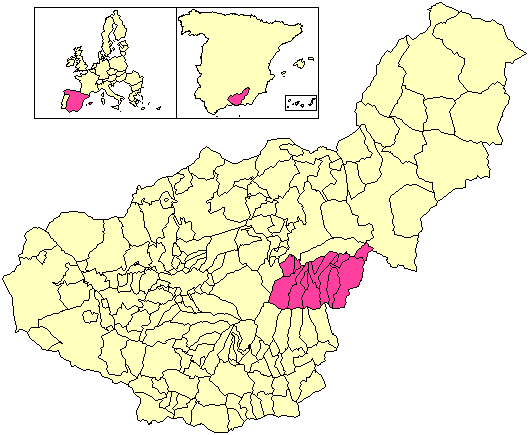
Location of the Mancomunidad del Marquesado del Zenete in the province of Granada.

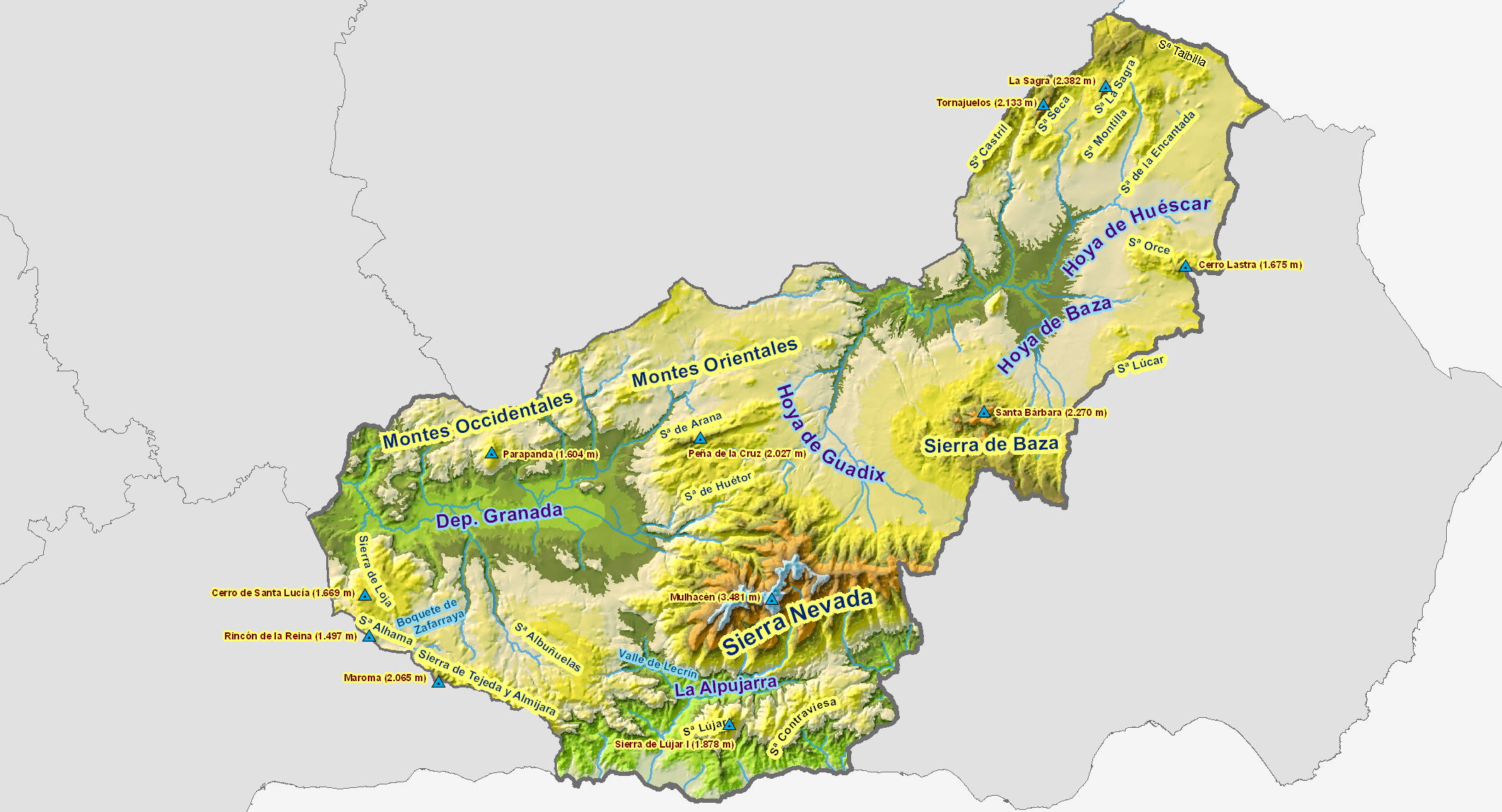
Relief map of Granada.

Coat of arms

The Mancomunidad de Municipios Marquesado del Zenete or Mancomunidad del Marquesado del Zenete ("Mancomunidad of municipalities of the Marquisate of Cenete") is a voluntary grouping (mancomunidad) of municipalities, located in the province of Granada, autonomous community of Andalusia, Spain. They take their name from the Marquisate of Cenete, the former seigneury (Spanish: señorio) in this area, which in turn takes its name (historically spelled either Zenete or Cenete) from the Arabic sened, meaning the slope that constitutes one side of a mountain range. That refers to the north slope of the Sierra Nevada, where the municipalities are located.

The objective of the mancomunidad is to promote, stimulate, and rationalize the social and economic development of the municipalities of which it is constituted. It also constitutes a subcomarca within the Comarca of Guadix.

The mancomunidad consists of the following municipalities:

- Albuñán
- Aldeire
- Alquife
- La Calahorra
- Cogollos de Guadix
- Dólar
- Ferreira
- Huéneja
- Jérez del Marquesado
- Lanteira

The Marquisate of Cenete extends north from the ridge line of the Sierra Nevada. In the northeast it reaches to the ridge line of the Sierra de Baza; most of the mancomunidad is the wide valley of the Zalabí; immediately to its north is the municipality of Valle de Zalabí.
