= Comarca de Guadix =

- Comarca
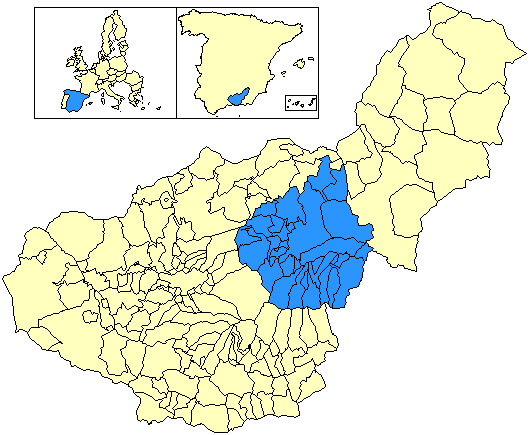
- Location of Comarca de Guadix in the province of Granada
- Coordinates: 37°16′3″N 3°9′42″W
- Country: Spain
- Autonomous community: Andalusia
- Province: Granada

Area
  - Total: 1,694 km^{2} (654 sq mi)

Population (2024) (Note: Estimate at 1 January 2024: National Statistics Institute (Spain))
  - Total: 41,366
  - Density: 24.42/km^{2} (63.25/sq mi)

Comarca de Guadix is a comarca in the province of Granada, in Andalusia, Spain. It is also called Accitania. This comarca was established in 2003 by the Government of Andalusia.

== Municipalities ==
It contains the following municipalities:

Arms	Municipality	Area (km^{2})	Population (2024) (Note: Estimate at 1 January 2024: National Statistics Institute (Spain))	Density (/km^{2})
	Albuñán	8.5	422	49.6
	Aldeire	70.1	592	8.4
	Alquife	12.2	557	45.7
	Beas de Guadix	16.2	316	19.5
	Benalúa	8.7	3,339	383.8
	La Calahorra	39.5	681	17.2
	Cogollos de Guadix	30.3	639	21.1
	Cortes y Graena	22.5	966	42.9
	Darro	50.6	1,695	33.5
	Diezma	42.1	810	19.2
	Dólar	78.5	606	7.7
	Ferreira	43.6	303	6.9
	Fonelas	96.3	964	10.0
	Gor	180.9	744	4.1
	Gorafe	77.1	373	4.8
	Guadix	324.3	18,725	57.7
	Huélago	32.8	358	10.9
	Huéneja	116.7	1,177	10.1
	Jérez del Marquesado	82.7	990	12.0
	Lanteira	52.8	543	10.3
	Lugros	63.0	308	4.9
	Marchal	7.8	425	54.5
	La Peza	101.3	1,107	10.9
	Polícar	5.4	266	49.3
	Purullena	21.2	2,338	110.3
	Valle del Zalabí	108.5	2,122	19.6
	Total	1,693.6	41,366	24.4
