= Jérez del Marquesado =

- Municipality
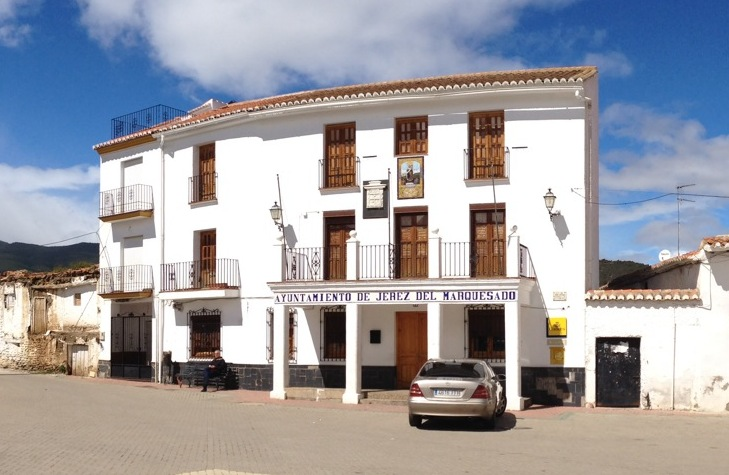
- Town hall

- Coat of arms

- Location in Spain
- Coordinates: 37°11′7″N 3°9′28″W
- Country: Spain
- Autonomous community: Andalusia
- Province: Granada
- Comarca: Comarca de Guadix
- Judicial district: Guadix

Government
  - Mayor: José Angel Pereda Hernández

Area
  - Total: 82.29 km^{2} (31.77 sq mi)
- Elevation: 1,230 m (4,040 ft)

Population (2025-01-01)
  - Total: 955
  - Density: 11.6/km^{2} (30.1/sq mi)
- Demonym: Jerezanos
- Time zone: UTC+1 (CET)
  - Summer (DST): UTC+2 (CEST)
- Postal code: 18518
- Website: Official website

Jérez del Marquesado is a municipality in the province of Granada, southern Spain. It borders the municipalities of Cogollos de Guadix, Albuñán, Valle del Zalabí, Alquife, Lanteira, Bérchules, Trevélez, Güéjar Sierra and Lugros.

== Context ==
Jérez, Xeriz in Arabic, was the most important town of the Sened followed by Marquesado del Zenete because of their location near important mineral deposits and a floodplain.

== History ==
Its origins go back to the prehistoric era, more specifically to the culture of El Argar, with remains of the Neolithic era, along with several mining operations from the Bronze Age that continued in Roman times.

In Roman times, the population was known by the names Sericus or Sericisand by the Arabs it would be Mecina or Alcázar (the castle) and Xerix (Seda) because of the coexistence of the two towns; Mecina, the ancient settlers and Xeriz, the Muslim.

The Muslim town (Xerix) was the predominant one. Consequently Mecina was integrated into it in the 12th century. Because of its abundance of water, the Nasrid kings of Granada created a farm consisting of extensive properties.

In 1960 a DC-4 (R5D-3) US Navy aircraft crashed in the foothills of Sierra Nevada in Jérez del Marquesado. The poverty-stricken town, lacking the equipment required, risked their lives to rescue 24 people.

== Economy ==
The economy is mainly agrarian, more specifically based on cereals, almonds and olives. There is also bovine, ovine and swine livestock.

In the past, a large part of the economy depended directly on the mines that provided work for the majority of people in the town. One of the mineral deposits is the Santa Constanza Mine, from which copper was extracted, located within the municipal territory. The other was the Alquife Mine, from which iron was extracted until its final closure in June 1997.

== Historical patrimony ==
Its urban center is formed by an important set of Moorish houses, mills and the remains of two medieval fortifications, as well as one of the Mudejar churches. There are remains of a fortress from the Nasrid period and of several medieval fortresses, all of them rectangular in shape. There are also remains of Arab baths next to the Mudejar church. Subsequent are the "Cruz blanca de las eras", next to the "pond", a water tank for the irrigation of its fertile orchards, commemorating of the visit of the Catholic Monarchs in 1489 and the Mudejar church of the 16th century with a coffered ceiling from this period and a facade mixing Christian tastes and Moorish reminiscences in the use of brick.

== Tourism and nature ==
The main attraction of Jérez del Marquesado is not only its urban center. Its location at the foot of the Sierra Nevada and its national park offers visitors a multitude of activities, such as climbs to Picón de Jérez, the summit of the region, more than 3000 meters high. Walks through its chestnut forest are another tourist attraction.

== Gastronomy ==
The history of Jérez del Marquesado has resulted in a wide range of typical foods, such as migas accompanied by fresh fruit. Others include cod rin-ran, corn flour gruel, and the empedrao. Desserts include fried milk or pestiños. Liqueurs include mistela, made with grape juice, aguardiente and spices from the area.

== Holidays ==
- Chiscos de San Antón is celebrated on the Saint’s day, January 17. The celebration consists of making bonfires (chiscos).
- Candlemas is celebrated on February 2. In the morning the procession takes place and then they go to the area called Chicharro Field with the products of the slaughter.
- San Marcos’ day is celebrated on April 25, the day of the saint. The procession of San Marcos takes place and then the “sanmarqueros” of the year distribute bread rolls to the townspeople.
- Pilgrimage of the Virgen de la Cabeza is held on the last Sunday of April. The pilgrimage is celebrated in the Zalabí Valley, carrying the Virgin on horseback.
- The date of Corpus Christi Day is variable (end of May or beginning of June). Corpus Christi is celebrated. Altars are made for the Lord.
- Saint Juan and Saint Pedro’s Holiday takes place on June 24 and 29. There are night parties.
- Celebrations of the Virgin of the Tizná are celebrated from September 8 to 12, and they consist of the patron saint's festivities. On the 11and 12 September, the famous enclosures of the town are held, to which many people come from both the town itself and the surrounding area.
- Cattle market is held from October 24 to 27 on the outskirts of the town. It consists of a meeting of farmers for the sale and purchase of livestock. In this fair cattle are exhibited and one can taste the traditional foods of the area.

== Images ==
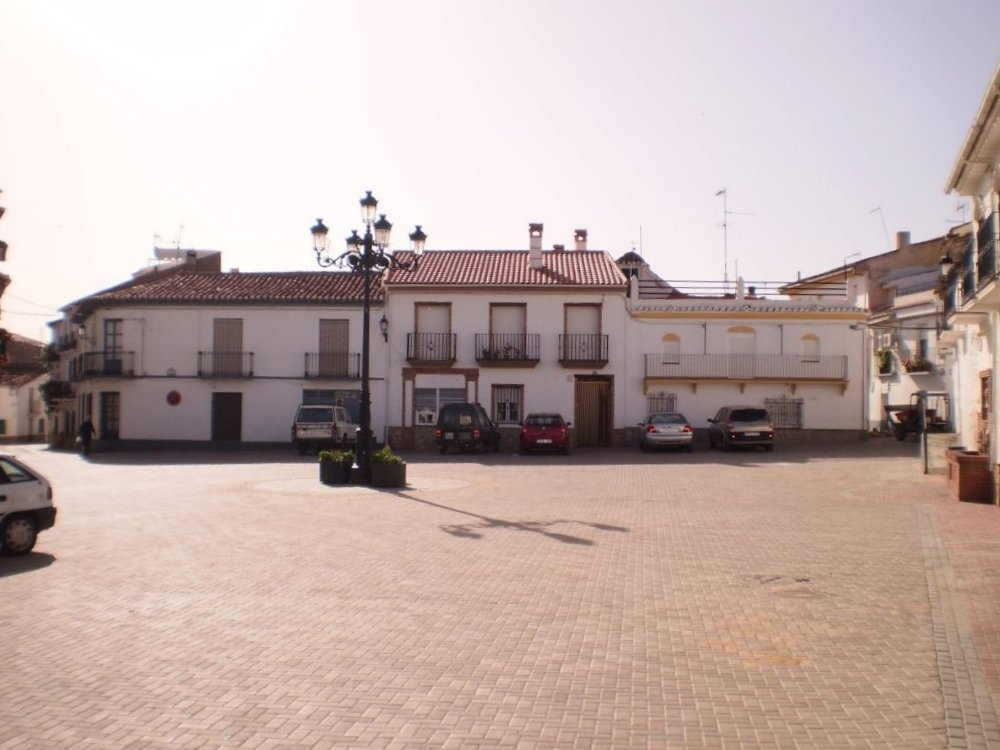
Plaza del Molino

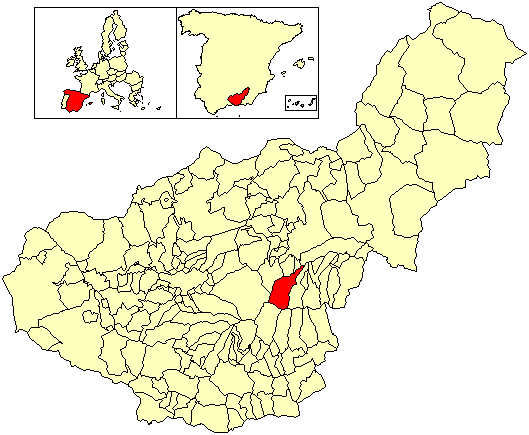
Location

== See also ==
- List of municipalities in Granada
