= Acci =

Ancient city in Spain

- Location within Spain
- 37°21′07″N 3°12′00″W
- Type: Settlement
- Location: Guadix el Viejo, Purullena, Comarca de Guadix, Province of Granada, Andalusia, Spain
- Region: Hispania Tarraconensis

Acci (Ancient Greek: Ἄκκι) was an ancient inland city of Hispania Tarraconensis, on the borders of Baetica. Under the Romans, and with the Jus Latinum, it was a colony with the full name of Colonia Julia Gemella Accitana. Its coins are numerous, bearing the heads of Augustus, Tiberius, Germanicus, Drusus, and Caligula, and the ensigns of the legions iii. and vi., from which it was colonized by Julius Caesar or Augustus, and from which it derived the name of Gemella. According to Macrobius, Mars was worshipped here with his head surrounded with the sun's rays, under the name of Netos. Such an emblem is seen on the coins. The town became Christian at an early date; the Diocese of Acci was established in 47 AD. The bishop is no longer resident in the uninhabited site, but Acci remains a titular see of the Roman Catholic Church.

The location is now called Guadix el Viejo or Castillo de Luchena in the municipality of Purullena, Comarca de Guadix, Province of Granada, Andalusia, Spain, and is 6 kilometres (3.7 mi) northwest of the modern city of Guadix. The site in inscribed in the Andalusian Institute's Database of Historical Patrimony for conservation.
