= Acci (disambiguation) =

Acci is an ancient city in Spain.

Acci may also refer to:

- Diocese of Acci, a bishopric founded in Acci
- ACCI, acronym for Australian Chamber of Commerce and Industry
