= Castillo de La Calahorra =

Castle in Granada, Spain

Coordinates: 37°11′0″N 3°3′55″W

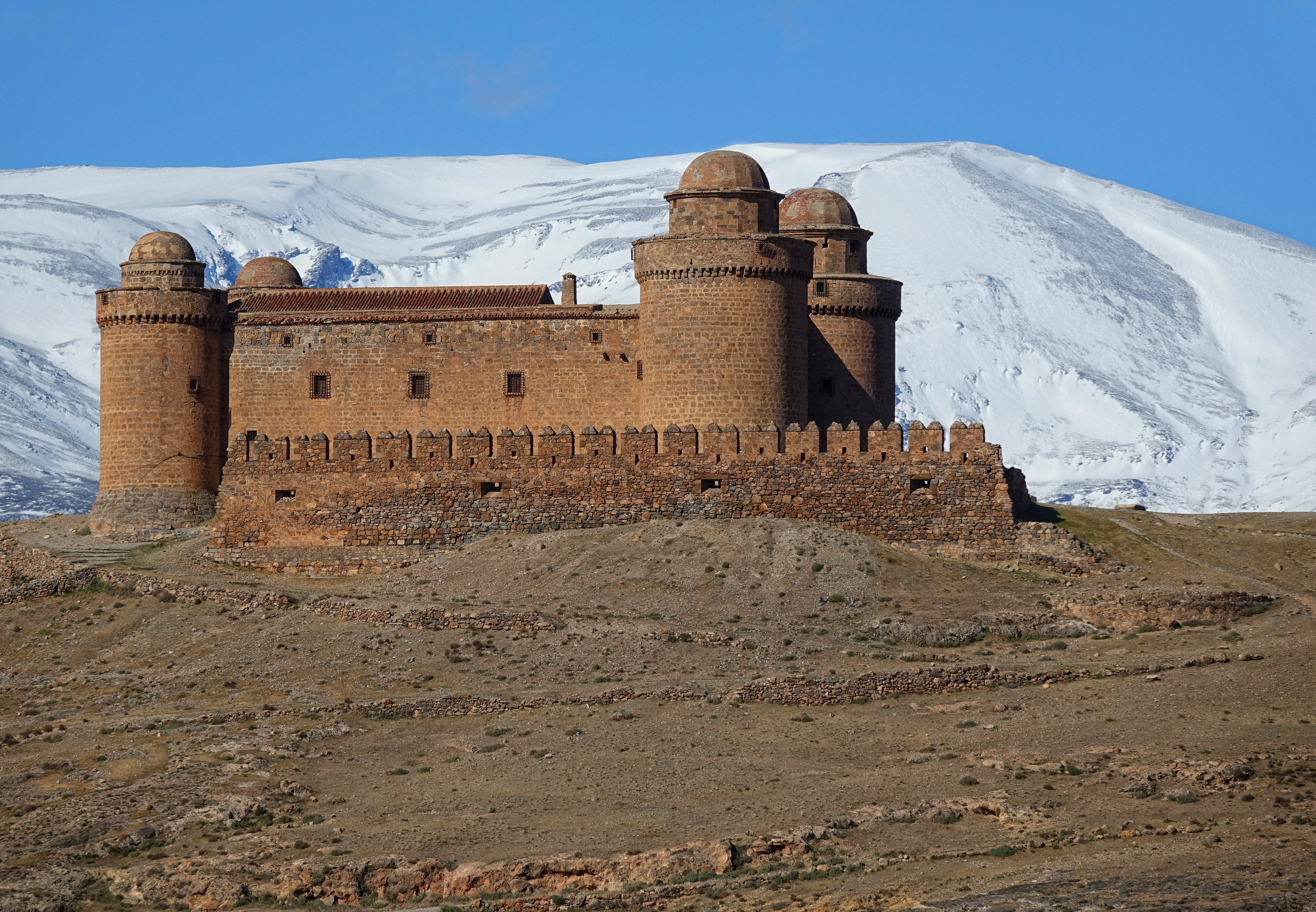
Castillo de La Calahorra located on a hill near La Calahorra

Castillo de La Calahorra is located in La Calahorra, in the province of Granada, Spain. It is situated in the Sierra Nevada foothills. Built between 1509 and 1512, it was one of the first Italian Renaissance castles to be built outside Italy. It was declared a Bien de Interés Cultural monument in 1922. It was featured in the 1974 film Stardust, as the retreat of Jim MacLaine (played by David Essex) in the latter parts of the film. It was also used as a manse in the city of Pentos for the 2022 television series House of the Dragon.

== In popular art and culture ==
In the movie For a Few Dollars More, when Colonel Douglas Mortimer disembarks from the train in the initial few minutes of the movie, the castle is seen in the distance, on the left of the train. The castle was also prominently featured in the 1975 movie, The Wind and the Lion.

The site is also featured in multiple videos by the band KLF, as featured in the documentary 23 Seconds to Eternity.

== Photo gallery ==
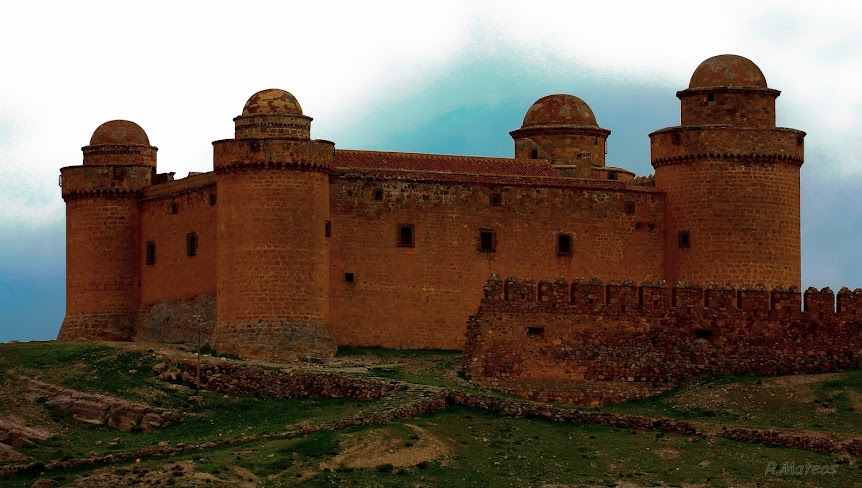
Castillo de la Calahorra

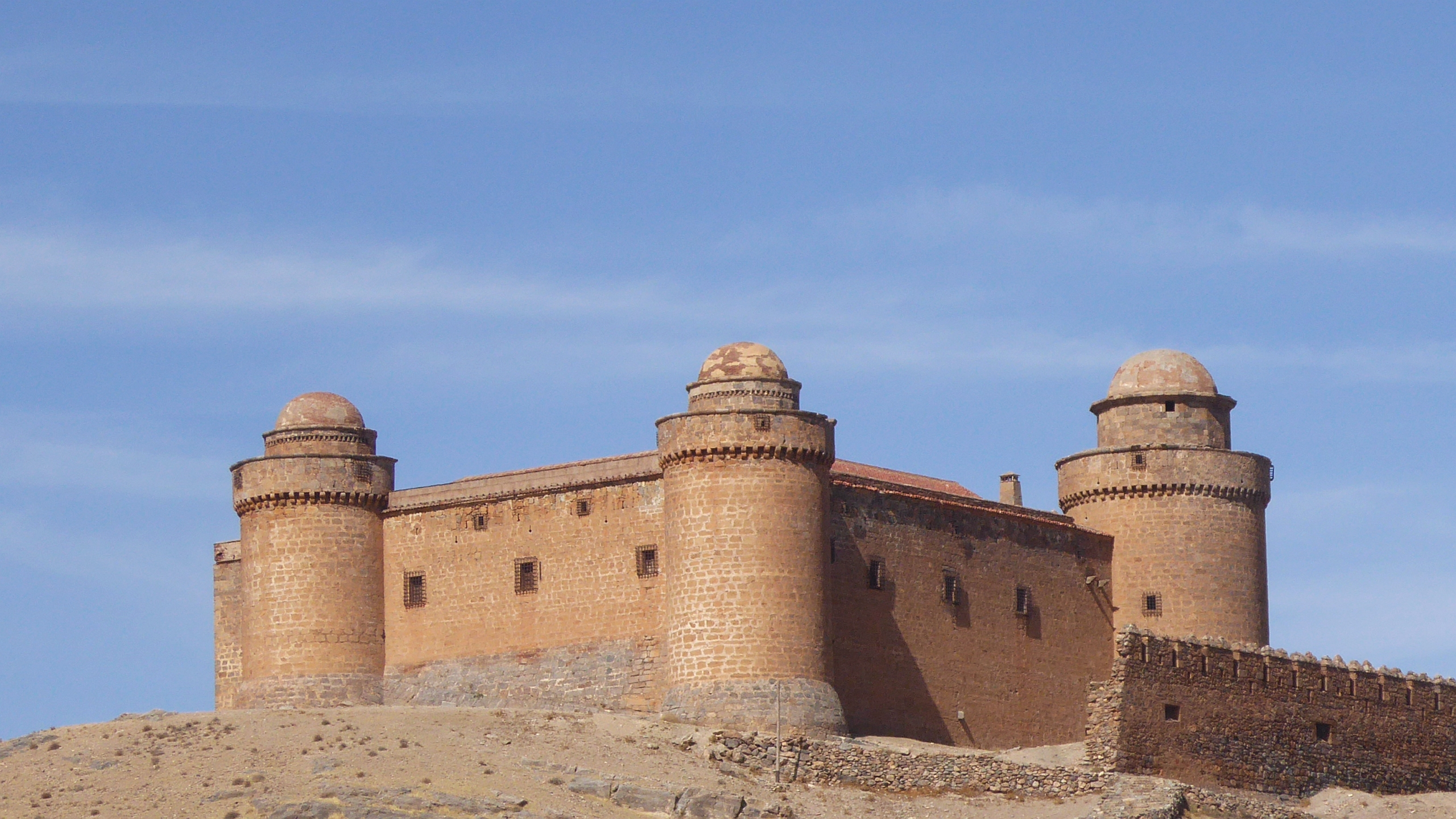
Castillo de la Calahorra

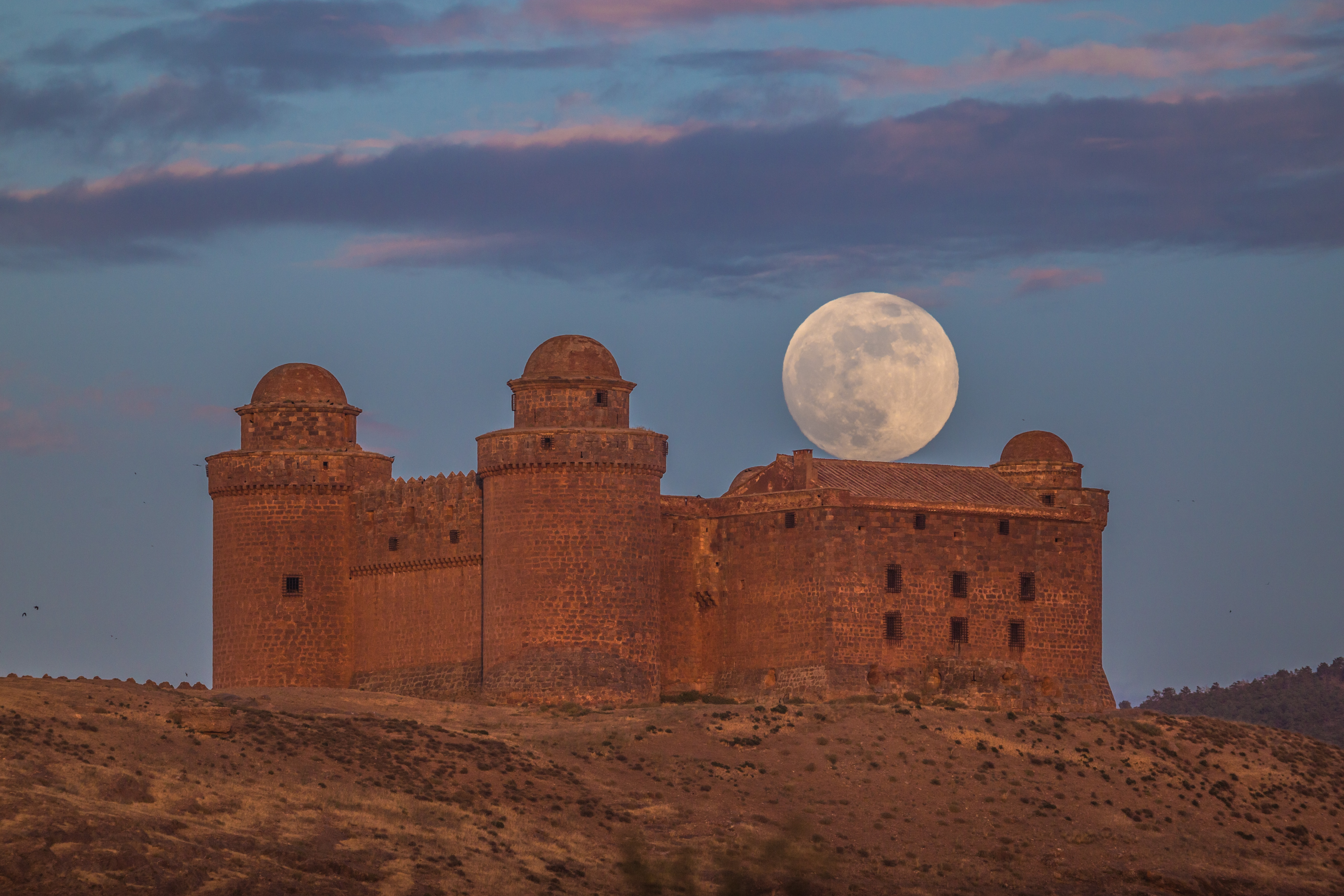
Full Moon over La Calahorra Castle.
