= Aldeire =

- Municipality
- Flag Coat of arms

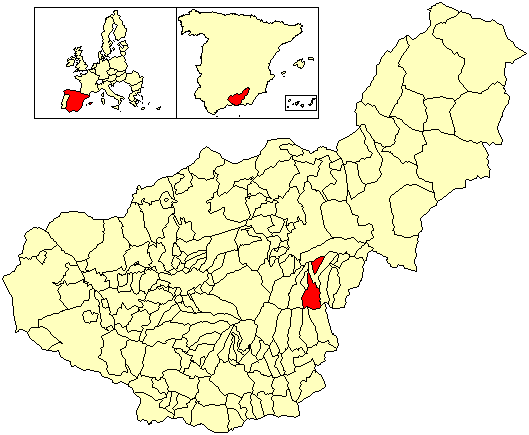
- Location of Aldeire
- Coordinates: 37°09′N 3°04′W
- Country: Spain
- Province: Granada
- Municipality: Aldeire

Area
  - Total: 67 km^{2} (26 sq mi)
- Elevation: 1,297 m (4,255 ft)

Population (2025-01-01)
  - Total: 597
  - Density: 8.9/km^{2} (23/sq mi)
- Time zone: UTC+1 (CET)
  - Summer (DST): UTC+2 (CEST)

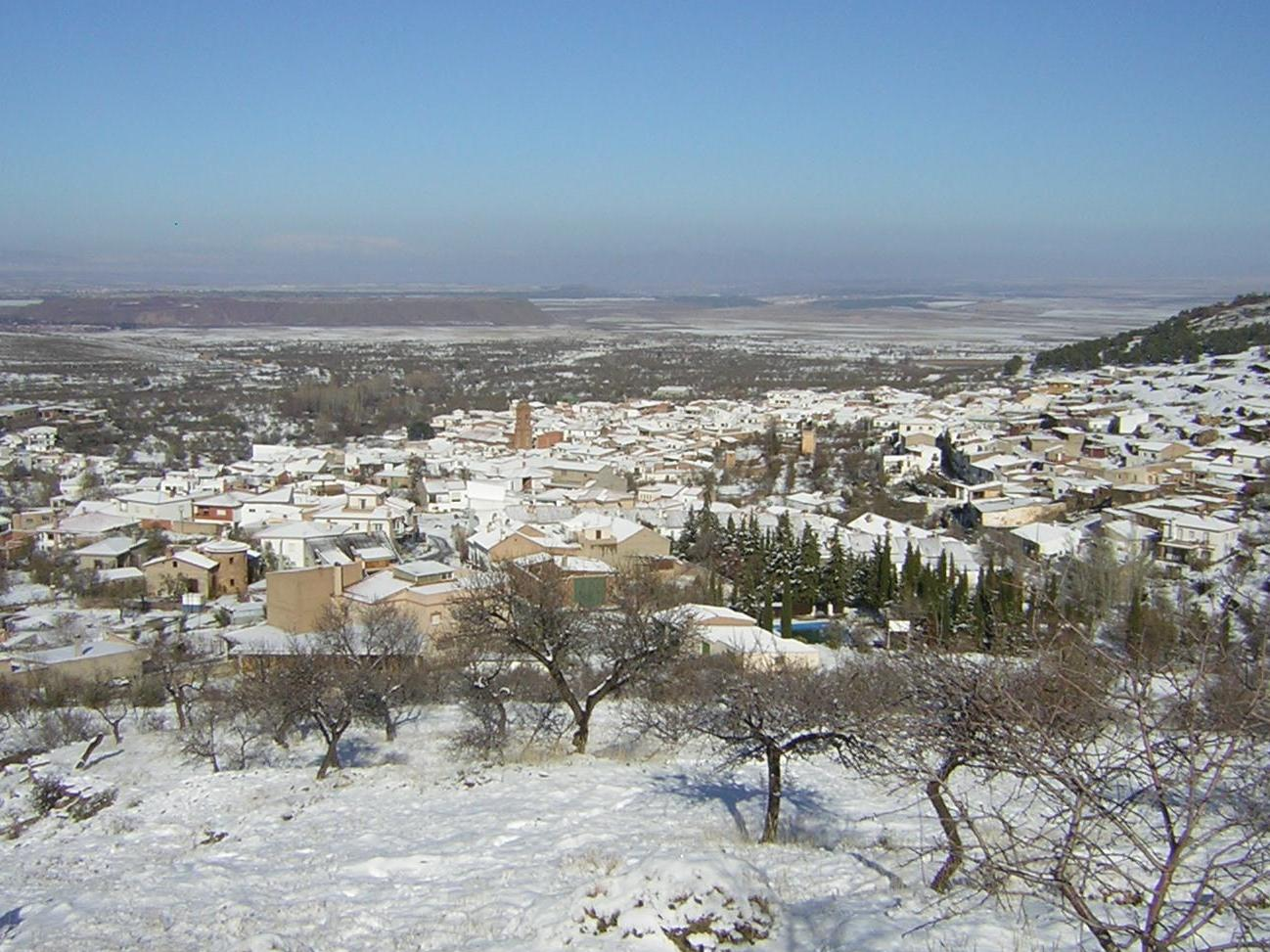
Aldeire in winter (2004)

Aldeire is a town located in the province of Granada, Spain. According to the 2016 census (INE), the city has a population of 639 inhabitants.

The municipality is split into two non-contiguous parts, having an exclave to the north called "Cortijo Ramos" - surrounded by Valle del Zalabí and La Calahorra municipalities.

A 150-megawatt CSP plant, Central Termosolar Andasol, is located within the "Cortijo Ramos" area.

== See also ==
- List of municipalities in Granada
