= Purullena =

Coordinates: 37°19′N 3°11′W

Purullena, Spain
- Flag Coat of arms

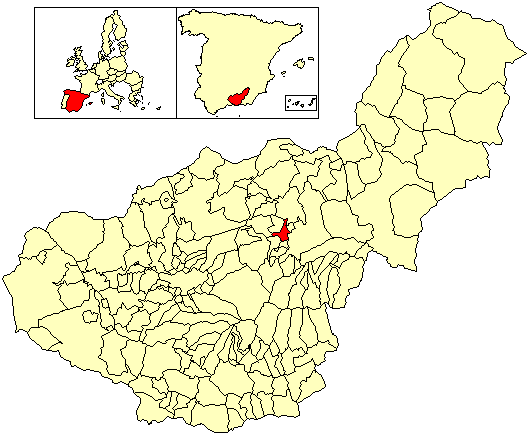
- Location of Purullena
- Country: Spain
- Province: Granada
- Municipality: Purullena

Area
  - Total: 21 km^{2} (8.1 sq mi)
- Elevation: 908 m (2,979 ft)

Population (2025-01-01)
  - Total: 2,409
  - Density: 110/km^{2} (300/sq mi)
- Time zone: UTC+1 (CET)
  - Summer (DST): UTC+2 (CEST)

Purullena is a municipality located in the province of Granada, Spain. According to the 2004 census (INE), the city has a population of 2286 inhabitants.

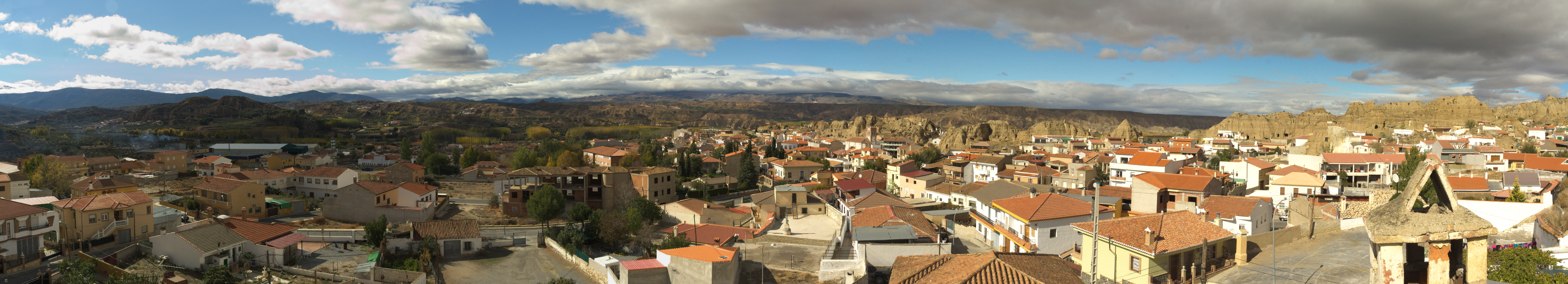
View of Purullena

== See also ==
- List of municipalities in Granada
