= Ferreira, Spain =

Coordinates: 37°10′21″N 3°02′07″W

Ferreira
- Flag Coat of arms

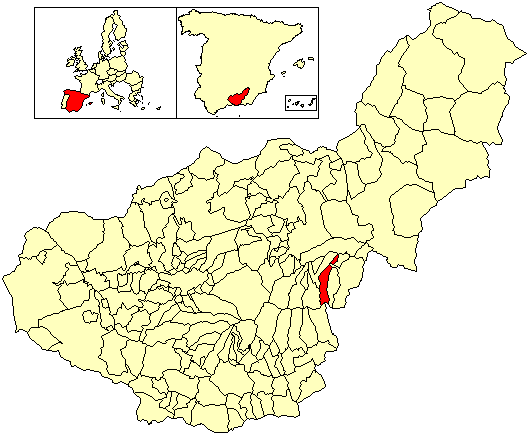

- Location in Spain.
- Country: Spain
- Autonomous community: Andalusia
- Province: Córdoba

Area
  - Total: 43 km^{2} (17 sq mi)
- Elevation: 1,274 m (4,180 ft)

Population (2025-01-01)
  - Total: 297
  - Density: 6.9/km^{2} (18/sq mi)
- Time zone: UTC+1 (CET)
  - Summer (DST): UTC+2 (CEST)

Ferreira is a municipality in the province of Granada, Spain. In 2010, it had a population of 338.

== See also ==
- List of municipalities in Granada
