= Dólar =

Municipality in Granada, Spain

- Flag Coat of arms

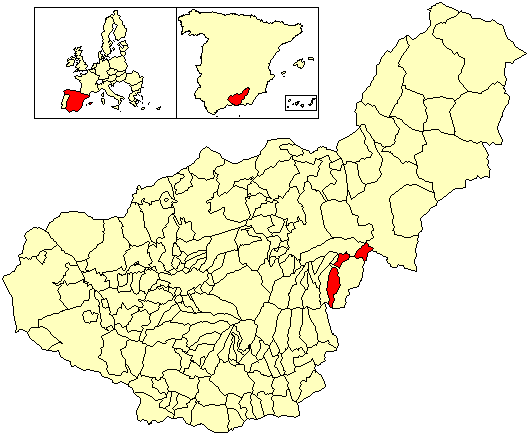

- Location of Dólar in Spain
- Coordinates: 37°11′N 3°00′W
- Country: Spain
- Autonomous community: Andalusia
- Province: Granada

Area
  - Total: 78 km^{2} (30 sq mi)
- Elevation: 1,209 m (3,967 ft)

Population (2025-01-01)
  - Total: 600
  - Density: 7.7/km^{2} (20/sq mi)
- Time zone: UTC+1 (CET)
  - Summer (DST): UTC+2 (CEST)

Dólar is a municipality in the province of Granada, Spain. As of 2010, it had a population of 624 inhabitants.

== See also ==
- List of municipalities in Granada
