= Albuñán =

- Municipality
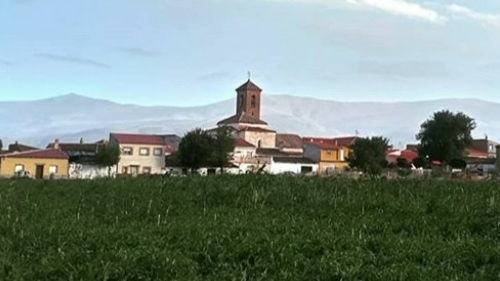

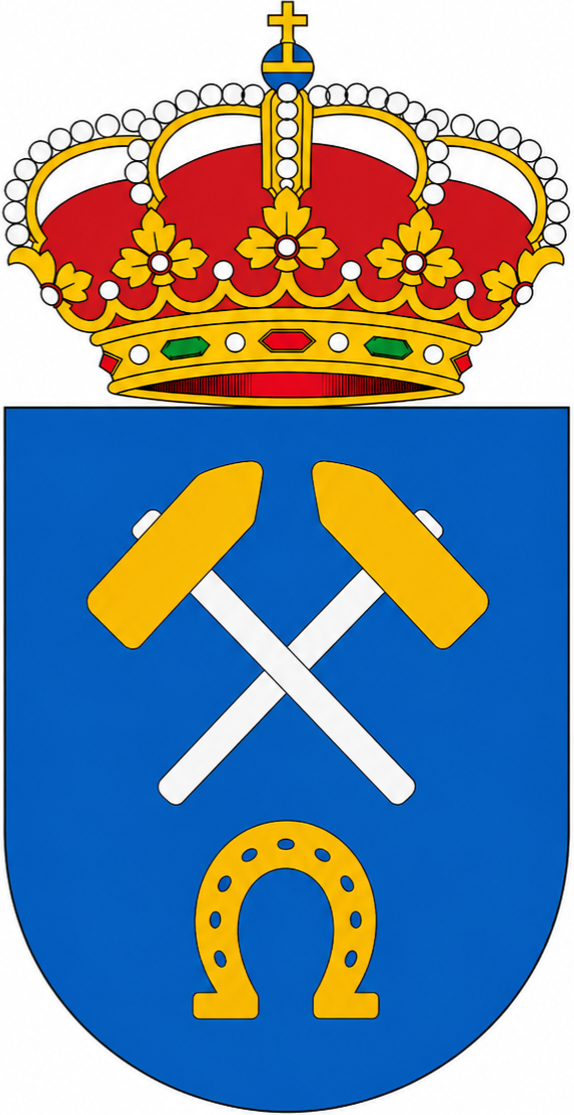
- Coat of arms

- Location in the Province of Granada Location in Andalusia Location in Spain
- Coordinates: 37°13′37.49″N 3°7′59.51″W
- Country: Spain
- Autonomous community: Andalusia
- Province: Granada
- Comarca: Guadix

Government
  - Mayor: Benito Morillas Morillas (PSOE)

Area
  - Total: 8 km^{2} (3.1 sq mi)
- Elevation: 1,120 m (3,670 ft)

Population (2025-01-01)
  - Total: 422
  - Density: 53/km^{2} (140/sq mi)
- Time zone: UTC+1 (CET)
  - Summer (DST): UTC+2 (CEST)
- Website: www.albunan.es

Albuñán is a city located in the province of Granada, Spain. According to the 2005 census (INE), the city has a population of 462 inhabitants.

== Notable people ==
- Mario Gómez, German football player. His paternal family comes from Albuñán. His father emigrated to Germany.

== See also ==
- List of municipalities in Granada
