= La Calahorra =

- Municipality
- Flag Coat of arms

- Location of La Calahorra in Spain
- Coordinates: 37.1791°N 3.0622°W
- Country: Spain
- Autonomous community: Andalusia
- Province: Córdoba

Area
  - Total: 39.45 km^{2} (15.23 sq mi)
- Elevation: 1,192 m (3,911 ft)

Population (2025-01-01)
  - Total: 680
  - Density: 17/km^{2} (45/sq mi)
- Time zone: UTC+1 (CET)
  - Summer (DST): UTC+2 (CEST)
- Website: www.lacalahorra.es

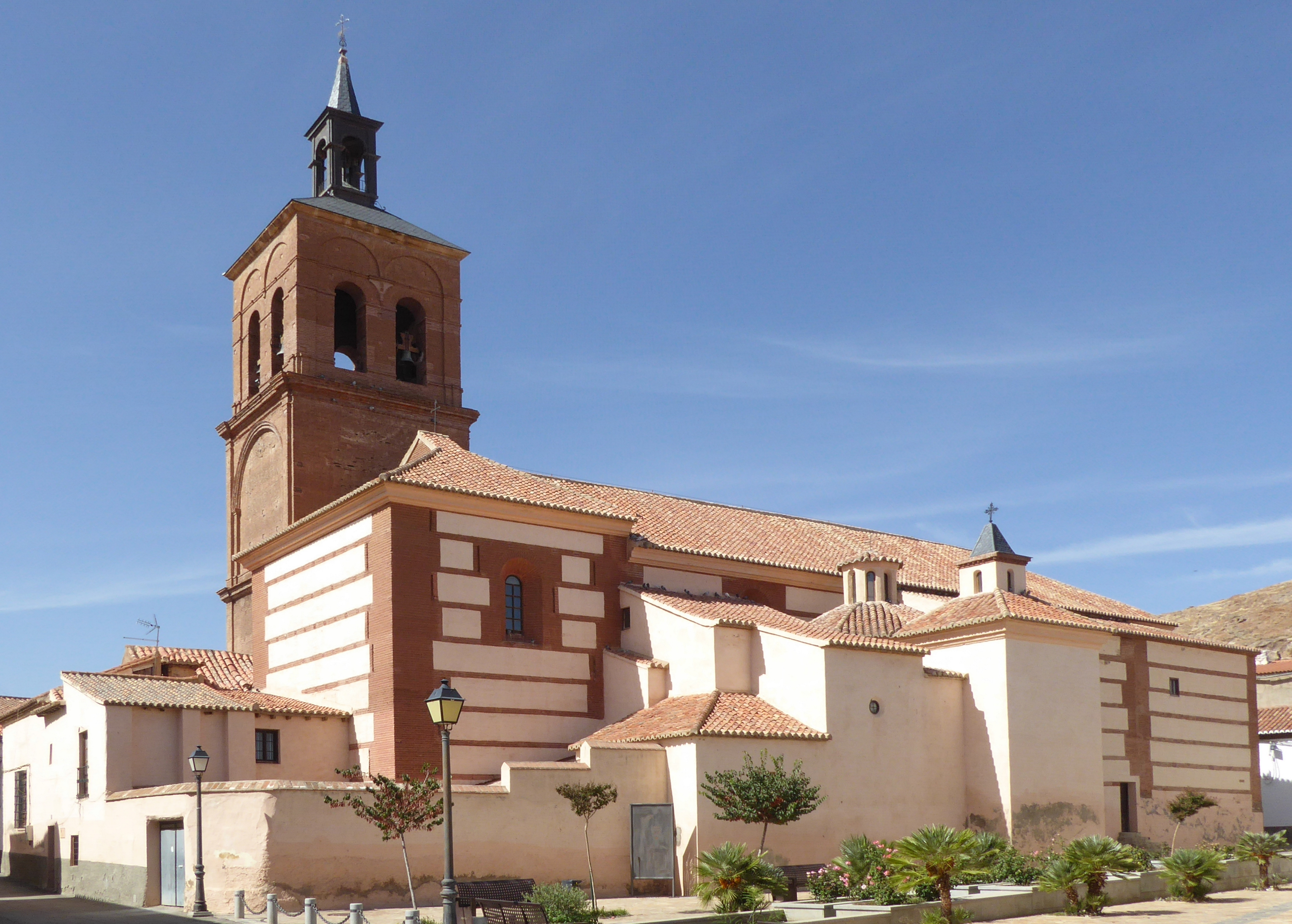
Iglesia de Nuestra Señora de la Anunciación (1546) in the centre of La Calahorra

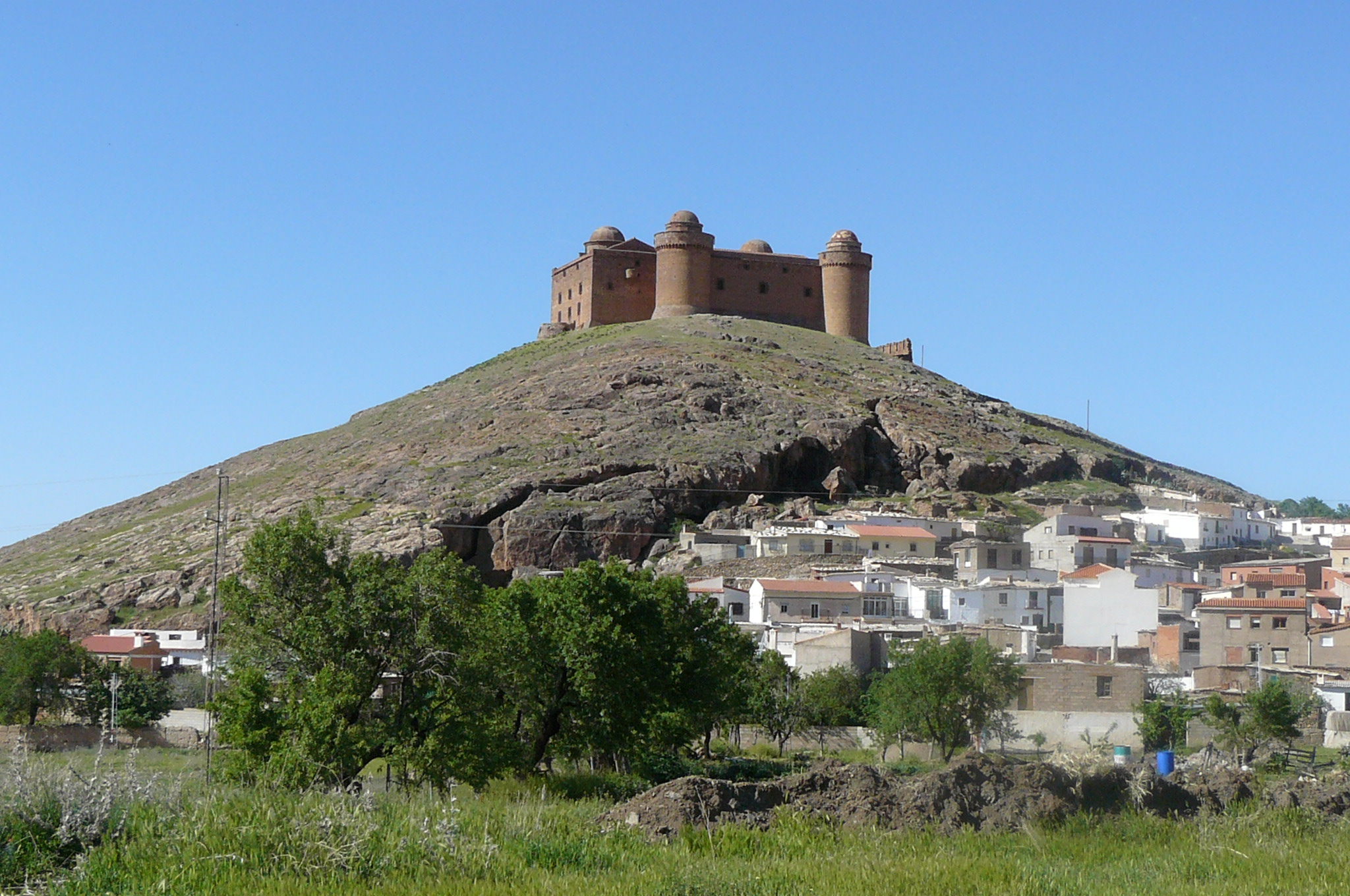
Castillo de La Calahorra and part of La Calahorra

La Calahorra is a municipality, part of the Comarca de Guadix, located in the middle of the Province of Granada, Spain. According to the 2019 census, the town has a population of 673 inhabitants.

Nearby, in the Sierra Nevada foothills, is the Castillo de La Calahorra. Built between 1509 and 1512, it is one of the first Italian Renaissance castles outside Italy.

The town aims to become a site of free-of-light pollution conservation following the nearby Sierra de los Filabres and Sierra Nevada Starlight Foundation certification project.

It is well known, as the setting of the final scenes in the 1974 David Essex film Stardust.

Central Termosolar Andasol, a 150-megawatt CSP plant, is located about 3.2 kilometres (2.0 miles) north of the town.

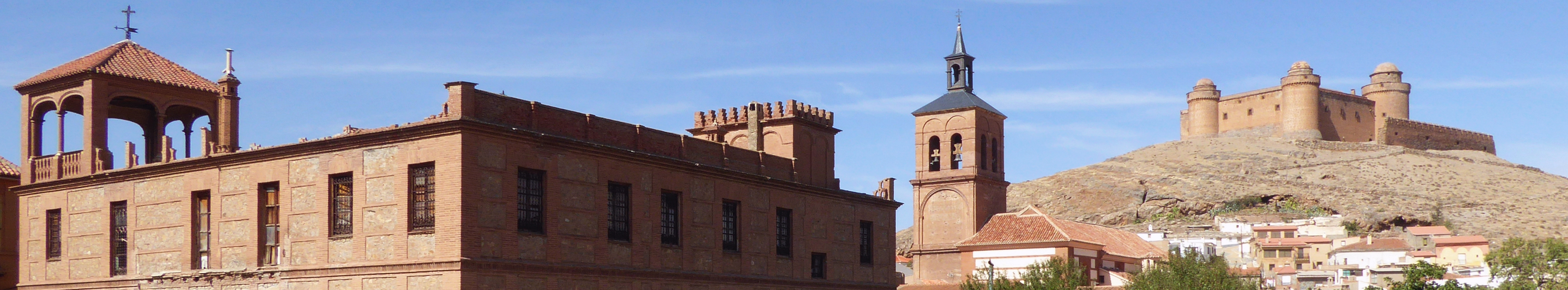
Panorama from the village of La Calahorra with historic building and the Church in the centre, in the background the 60 higher located Castillo de La Calahorra (Photo 2016)

== See also ==
- List of municipalities in Granada
