= Huéneja =

Coordinates: 37°10′N 2°58′W

Huéneja, Spain
- city
- Flag Coat of arms

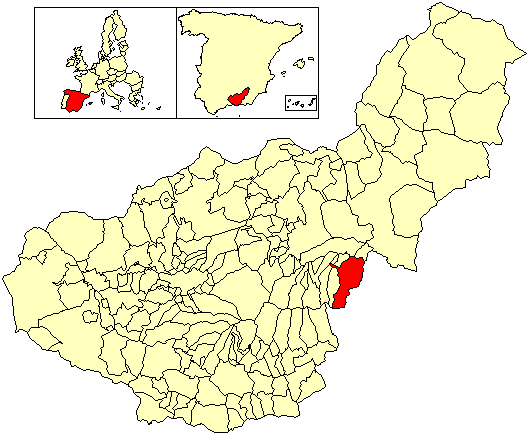
- Location of Huéneja
- Country: Spain
- Province: Granada
- Municipality: Huéneja

Area
  - Total: 116 km^{2} (45 sq mi)
- Elevation: 1,000 m (3,300 ft)

Population (2025-01-01)
  - Total: 1,180
  - Density: 10.2/km^{2} (26.3/sq mi)
- Time zone: UTC+1 (CET)
  - Summer (DST): UTC+2 (CEST)

Huéneja is a municipality located in the province of Granada, Spain. According to the 2004 census, (INE), the city has a population of 1,222 inhabitants.

== See also ==
- List of municipalities in Granada
