= Lugros, Granada =

Lugros
- Municipality
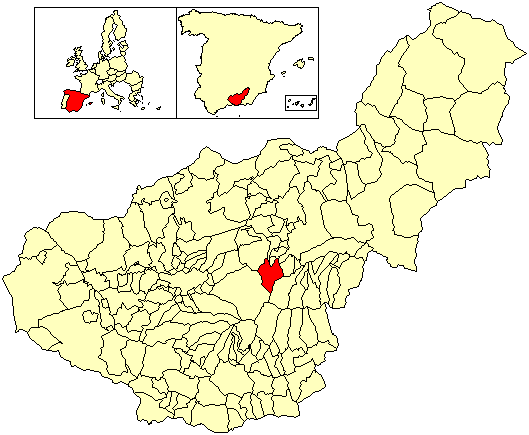
- Location of Lugros

- Location in Spain
- Coordinates: 37°14′N 3°14′W
- Country: Spain
- Autonomous community: Andalusia
- Province: Granada
- Comarca: Comarca de Guadix
- Judicial district: Guadix

Government
  - Alcalde: Agustín Fernández Molina (2009)

Area
  - Total: 63 km^{2} (24 sq mi)
- Elevation: 1,250 m (4,100 ft)

Population (2025-01-01)
  - Total: 306
  - Density: 4.9/km^{2} (13/sq mi)
- Demonym(s): Lugreño, -a
- Time zone: UTC+1 (CET)
  - Summer (DST): UTC+2 (CEST)
- Postal code: 18516
- Website: Official website

Lugros is a municipality located in the province of Granada, southeastern Spain, in the comarca of Guadix. It is in the North skirt of Sierra Nevada in the valley called by the villagers “Valley of the aim of the World”. A great part of its territory lies within the national park of Sierra Nevada with hundreds of endemic plants that are unique to this zone.

== History ==
Recorded references to Lugros throughout history are scant, perhaps due to its situation as the last inhabited enclave in this region of the mountain range. It is difficult to establish the date or the exact origin of Lugros due to the little and dispersed documentation that exists, much of it lost in time. The origin of the town seems to be in the Low Empire, more concretely at the time of the Mozárabes, although other sources think that its origin was previous to this. After the reconquest the area was repoblada with Castilian old Christians. During the nazarí period it was a dependent farmhouse of Beas de Guadix (then Beas of the Captives) and continued as such . Numerous archaeological outcrops were discovered through early metal search in the region. There are left the ruins of one old blacksmith shop today. The toponímico of the town is of Latin origin, comes from “lupus” (wolf), animal that had to be common once. From It derived “luberos” and “lubros there”, and ended up evolving into the present Lugros. The gentilicio of its people are “lugreños”, also erroneously called “lureños”, and to the town “Luros”, at another time they were “lubrises” and “lubríes”.

== See also ==
- List of municipalities in Granada
