= Cogollos de Guadix =

- Coat of arms

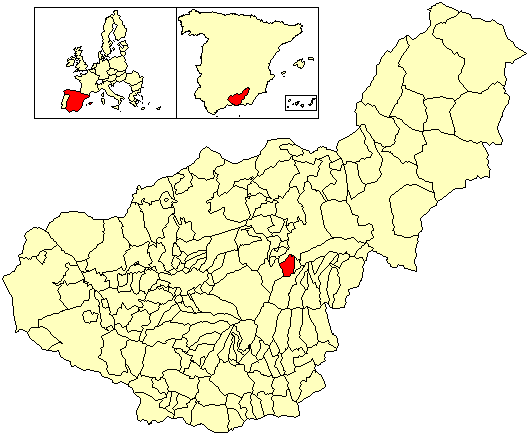
- Location of Cogollos de Guadix
- Coordinates: 37°13′N 3°09′W
- Country: Spain
- Province: Granada
- Municipality: Cogollos de Guadix

Area
  - Total: 30.26 km^{2} (11.68 sq mi)
- Elevation: 1,160 m (3,810 ft)

Population (2025-01-01)
  - Total: 614
  - Density: 20.3/km^{2} (52.6/sq mi)
- Time zone: UTC+1 (CET)
  - Summer (DST): UTC+2 (CEST)

Cogollos de Guadix is a municipality located in the province of Granada, Spain. According to the 2005 census (INE), the city has a population of 741 inhabitants.

== Cultural Heritage ==
The Church of Nuestra Señora de la Anunciación, the Hermitage of the Virgen de la Cabeza, and a commemorative cross honoring those who perished in past conflicts are located in the area. Additionally, remnants of Roman ruins can be found scattered throughout the area.

== See also ==
- List of municipalities in Granada
