= Lanteira =

Coordinates: 37°10′N 3°09′W

Lanteira, Spain
- city
- Coat of arms

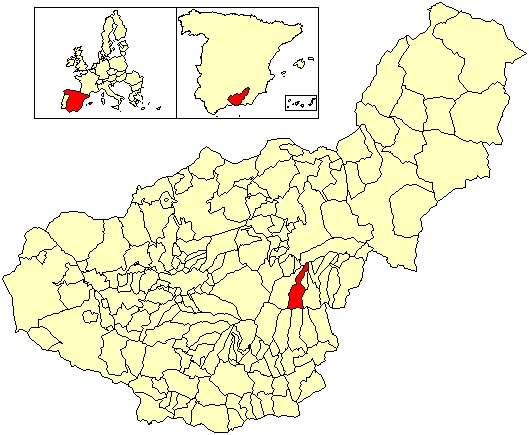
- Location of Lanteira
- Country: Spain
- Province: Granada
- Municipality: Lanteira

Area
  - Total: 52 km^{2} (20 sq mi)

Population (2025-01-01)
  - Total: 533
  - Density: 10/km^{2} (27/sq mi)
- Time zone: UTC+1 (CET)
  - Summer (DST): UTC+2 (CEST)

Lanteira is a municipality located in the province of Granada, Spain. According to the 2004 census (INE), the city has a population of 507 inhabitants.

== See also ==
- List of municipalities in Granada
- Emirate of Granada
- Province of Spain
- Sierra Nevada National Park
