= Valle del Zalabí =

- Municipality
- Flag Coat of arms

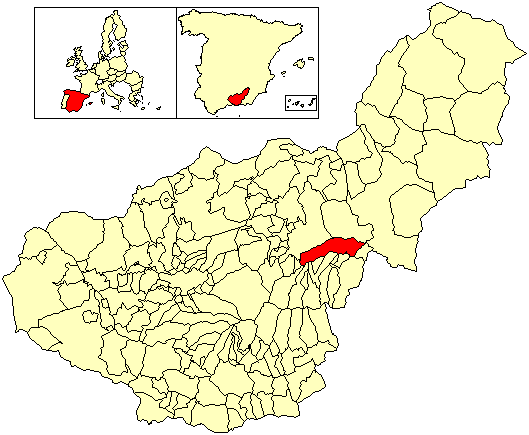
- Location of Valle del Zalabí
- Coordinates: 37.2861°N 3.0089°W
- Country: Spain
- Province: Granada
- Municipality: Valle del Zalabí

Government
  - Mayor: Manuel Aranda (PSOE)

Area
  - Total: 108 km^{2} (42 sq mi)
- Elevation: 1,011 m (3,317 ft)

Population (2025-01-01)
  - Total: 2,128
  - Density: 19.7/km^{2} (51.0/sq mi)
- Time zone: UTC+1 (CET)
  - Summer (DST): UTC+2 (CEST)

Valle del Zalabí is a municipality located in the province of Granada, Spain. According to (INE), the town has a population of 2,315 inhabitants in 2011.

It is mainly formed by the neighbourhoods of Exfiliana, Alcudia de Guadix and Charches, which were independent municipalities until 1973.

== See also ==
- List of municipalities in Granada
