= Alquife =

Coordinates: 37°11′N 3°07′W

Alquife, Spain
- Coat of arms

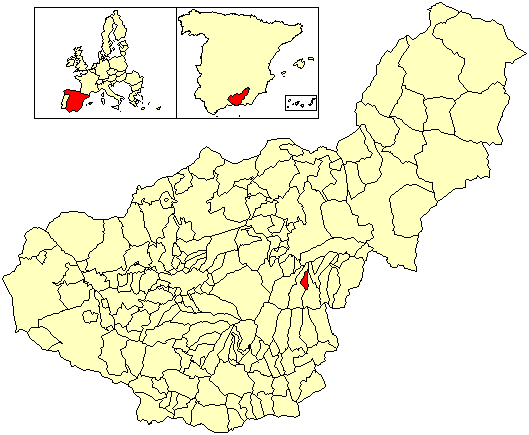
- Location of Alquife
- Country: Spain
- Province: Granada
- Municipality: Alquife

Area
  - Total: 12 km^{2} (4.6 sq mi)
- Elevation: 1,195 m (3,921 ft)

Population (2025-01-01)
  - Total: 543
  - Density: 45/km^{2} (120/sq mi)
- Time zone: UTC+1 (CET)
  - Summer (DST): UTC+2 (CEST)

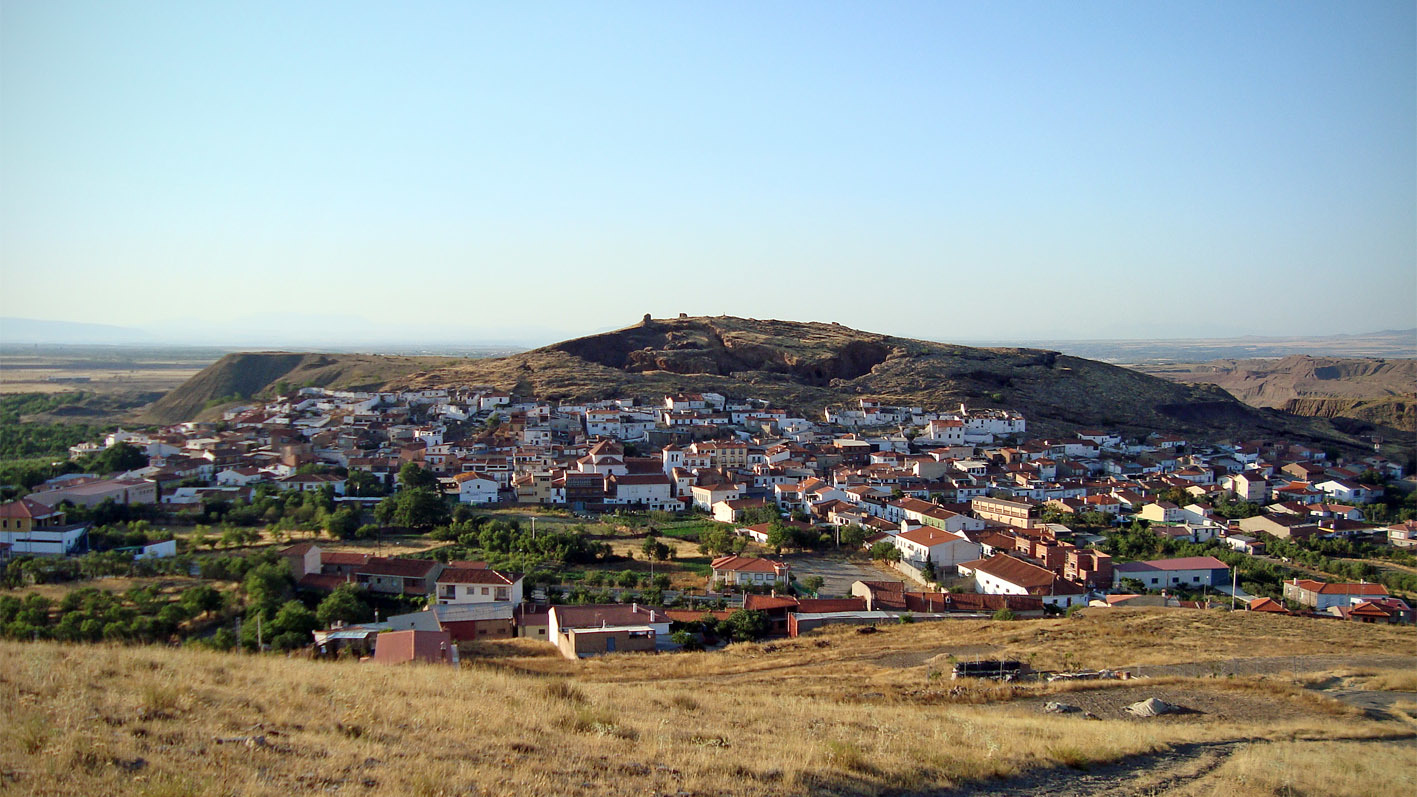
Alquife (2009)

Alquife is a town located in the province of Granada, Spain. According to the 2005 census (INE), the town has a population of 780 inhabitants. It is famous due to its iron mines that since Ancient Roman times gave prosperity to the area. In February 1997, Compañía Andaluza de Minas fired its 264 workers and closed the operation. Along with the mines, the mining community of Alquife was built. It is currently abandoned, though there are plans to reopen the mines as at August 2020.

== See also ==
- List of municipalities in Granada
