= Pope Paul VI =

Head of the Catholic Church from 1963 to 1978

Pope Saint Paul VI
- Bishop of Rome
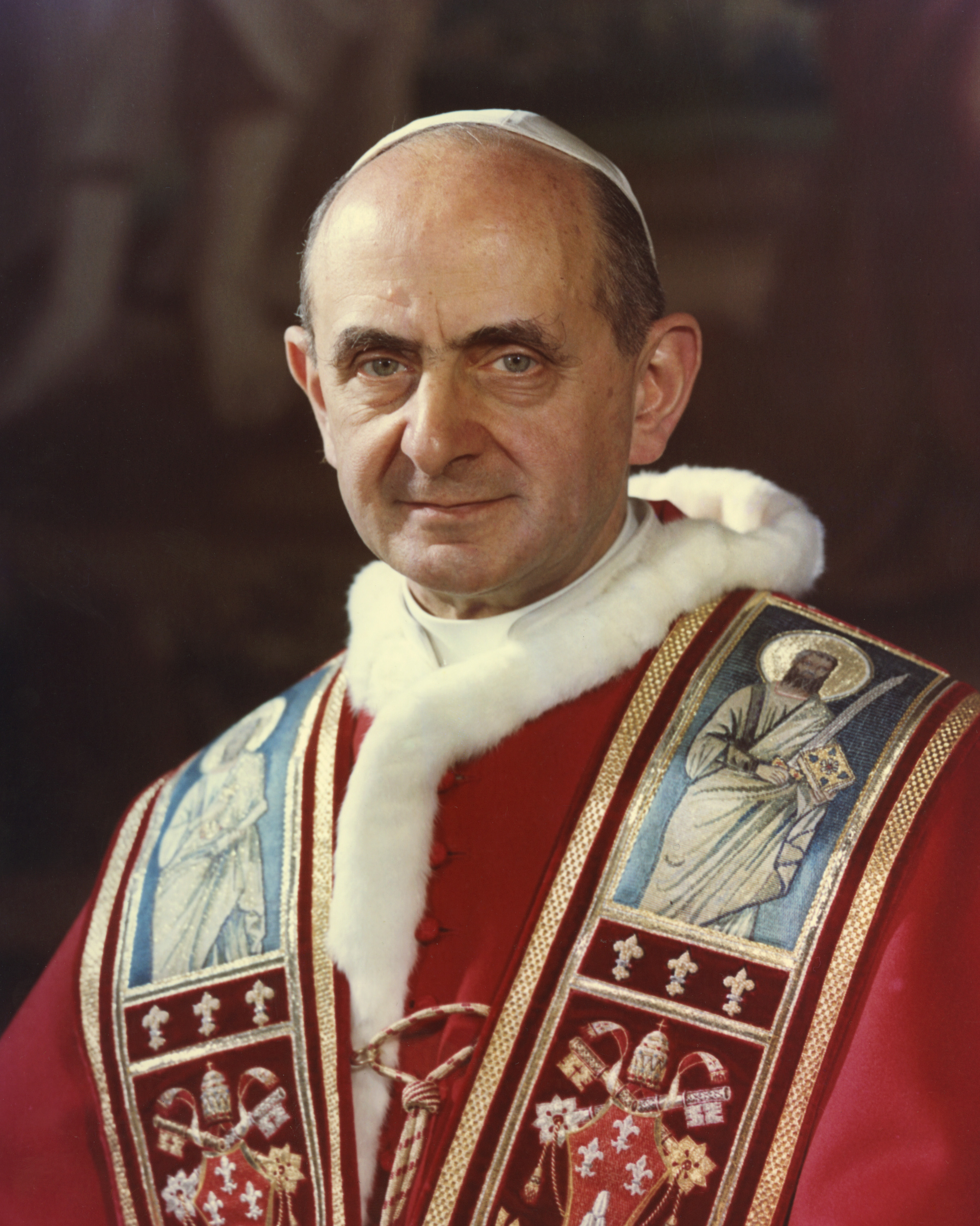
- Official portrait, 1969
- Church: Catholic Church
- Papacy began: 21 June 1963
- Papacy ended: 6 August 1978
- Predecessor: John XXIII
- Successor: John Paul I
- Previous posts: Referendary Prelate of the Apostolic Signatura (1926‍–‍1938); Substitute for General Affairs (1937‍–‍1953); Pro-Secretary for Ordinary Affairs of Secretariat of State (1953‍–‍1954); Archbishop of Milan (1954‍–‍1963); Cardinal Priest of Santi Silvestro e Martino ai Monti (1958‍–‍1963)

Orders
- Ordination: 29 May 1920 by Giacinto Gaggia
- Consecration: 12 December 1954 by Eugène Tisserant
- Created cardinal: 15 December 1958 by John XXIII
- Rank: Cardinal priest

Personal details
- Born: Giovanni Battista Enrico Antonio Maria Montini; 26 September 1897 Concesio, Italy
- Died: 6 August 1978 (aged 80) Castel Gandolfo, Italy
- Buried: Vatican Grottoes, St. Peter's Basilica
- Education: University of Milan (JCD)
- Motto: Cum Ipso in monte sancto (Latin for 'With Him on the holy mountain'); In nomine Domini (Latin for 'In the name of the Lord')
- Signature: Paul VI's signature

- Coat of arms: Paul VI's coat of arms

Sainthood
- Feast day: 29 May; 30 May (Ambrosian Rite)
- Venerated in: Catholic Church, Palmarian Catholic Church
- Title as Saint: Confessor of the Faith
- Beatified: 19 October 2014; St. Peter's Square, Vatican City by Pope Francis
- Canonized: 14 October 2018; St. Peter's Square, Vatican City by Pope Francis
- Attributes: Papal tiara; Papal vestments; Pallium
- Patronage: Archdiocese of Milan; Paul VI Pontifical Institute; Second Vatican Council; Diocese of Brescia; Concesio; Magenta; Paderno Dugnano

Ordination history
History
Diaconal ordination
- Date: 28 February 1920
- Place: Concesio, Brescia
Priestly ordination
- Ordained by: Giacinto Gaggia
- Date: 29 May 1920
- Place: Concesio, Brescia
Episcopal consecration
- Principal consecrator: Eugène Tisserant
- Co-consecrators: Giacinto Tredici; Domenico Bernareggi
- Date: 12 December 1954
- Place: St. Peter's Basilica, Vatican City
Cardinalate
- Elevated by: Pope John XXIII
- Date: 15 December 1958
Episcopal succession
Bishops consecrated by Pope Paul VI as principal consecrator
- Giuseppe Schiavini: 22 May 1955
- Cesário Alexandre Minali: 5 June 1955
- Ubaldo Teofano Stella: 3 October 1955
- Domenico Enrici: 1 November 1955
- Aristide Pirovano: 13 November 1955
- Adolfo Luís Bossi: 14 September 1958
- Antonio Fustella: 25 June 1960
- Giovanni Umberto Colombo: 7 December 1960
- Luigi Oldani: 7 December 1961
- Francesco Rossi: 26 May 1963
- Igino Eugenio Cardinale: 20 October 1963
- Albert Reuben Edward Thomas: 20 October 1963
- Giovanni Fallani: 28 June 1964
- Johannes Willebrands: 28 June 1964
- Leobard D'Souza: 3 December 1964
- Ferdinando Giuseppe Antonelli: 19 March 1966
- Giacomo Violardo: 19 March 1966
- Loris Francesco Capovilla: 16 July 1967
- Agostino Casaroli: 16 July 1967
- Ernesto Civardi: 16 July 1967
- Paul Marcinkus: 6 January 1969
- Louis Vangeke: 3 December 1970
- Annibale Bugnini: 13 February 1972
- Giuseppe Casoria: 13 February 1972
- Enrico Bartolucci Panaroni: 29 June 1973
- Jean Jerome Hamer: 29 June 1973
- Andrzej Maria Deskur: 30 June 1974
- Nicola Rotunno: 30 June 1974

Pope Paul VI (Note: Latin: Paulus PP. VI; Italian: Paolo VI; Brescian: Pàol VI.) (born Giovanni Battista Enrico Antonio Maria Montini; (Note: Italian pronunciation: [dʒoˈvanni batˈtista enˈriːko anˈtɔːnjo maˈriːa monˈtiːni].) 26 September 1897 – 6 August 1978) was head of the Catholic Church and sovereign of Vatican City from 21 June 1963 until his death on 6 August 1978. Succeeding John XXIII, he continued the Second Vatican Council, which he closed in 1965, implementing its numerous reforms. He fostered improved ecumenical relations with Eastern Orthodox and Protestant churches, which resulted in many historic meetings and agreements.

Born in Concesio, Montini served in the Holy See's Secretariat of State from 1922 to 1954, and along with Domenico Tardini was considered the closest and most influential advisor of Pope Pius XII. In 1954, Pius named Montini Archbishop of Milan, the largest Italian diocese. Montini later became the Secretary of the Italian Bishops' Conference. John XXIII elevated Montini to the College of Cardinals in 1958, and after his death, Montini was, with little to no opposition, elected his successor, taking the name Paul VI.

He reconvened the Second Vatican Council, which had been suspended during the interregnum. After its conclusion, Paul VI took charge of the interpretation and implementation of its mandates, finely balancing the conflicting expectations of various Catholic groups. The resulting reforms were among the widest and deepest in the Church's history.

Paul VI spoke repeatedly to Marian conventions and Mariological meetings, visited Marian shrines and issued three Marian encyclicals. Following Ambrose of Milan, he named Mary as the Mother of the Church during the Second Vatican Council. In January 1964, he flew to Jordan, the first time a reigning pontiff had left Italy in more than a century. His opposition to birth control was published in the 1968 encyclical Humanae vitae. Paul VI described himself as a humble servant of a suffering humanity and demanded significant changes from the rich in North America and Europe in favour of the poor in the Third World.

Pope Benedict XVI, citing his heroic virtue, proclaimed him venerable on 20 December 2012. Pope Francis beatified Paul VI on 19 October 2014, after the recognition of a miracle attributed to his intercession. His liturgical feast was celebrated on the date of his birth, 26 September, until 2019 when it was changed to the date of his priestly ordination, 29 May. Pope Francis canonised him on 14 October 2018. Paul VI is venerated in the Catholic Church, and the Palmarian Catholic Church.

== Early life ==
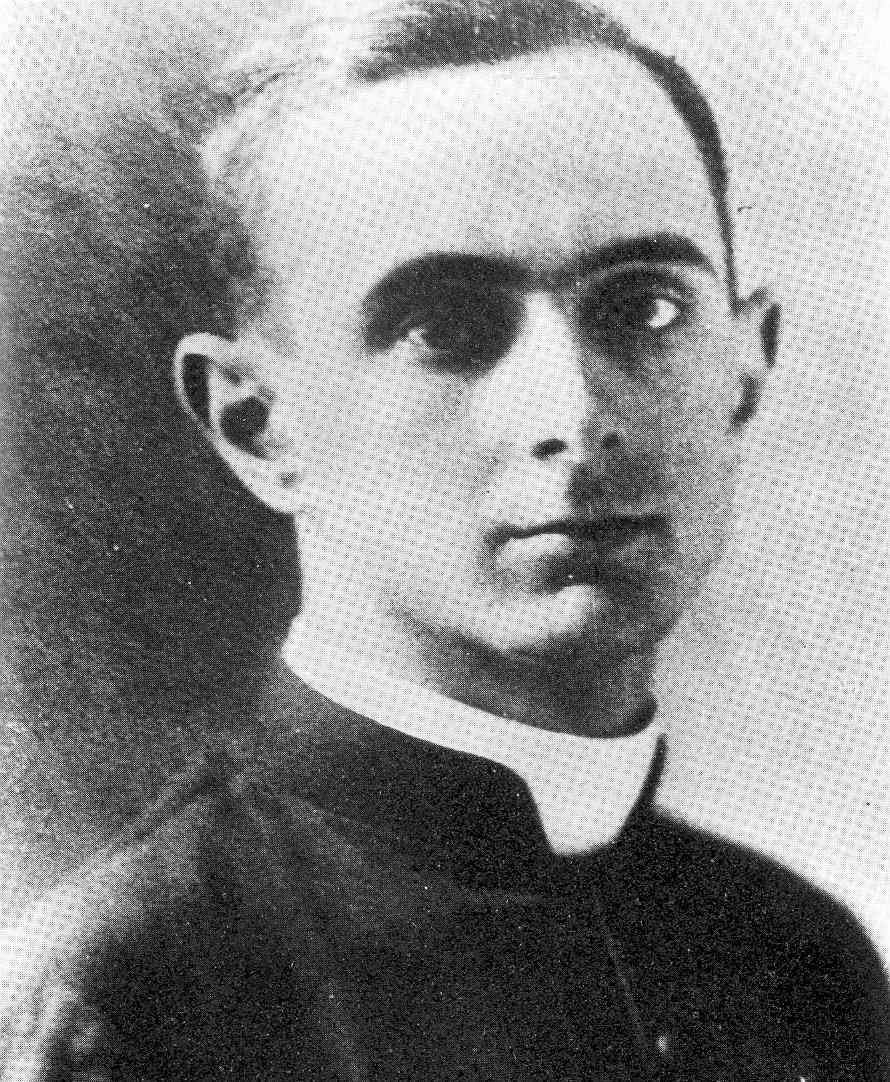
Montini on the day of his ordination, 1920

Giovanni Battista Enrico Antonio Maria Montini was born in the village of Concesio, in the Province of Brescia, Lombardy, Italy, on 26 September 1897. His father, Giorgio Montini (1860–1943), was a lawyer, journalist, director of the Catholic Action, and member of the Italian Parliament. His mother, Giudetta Alghisi (1874–1943), was from a family of rural nobility. He had two brothers, Francesco Montini (1900–1971), who became a physician, and Lodovico Montini (1896–1990), who became a lawyer and politician. On 30 September 1897, he was baptised with the name Giovanni Battista Enrico Antonio Maria Montini. He attended the Cesare Arici school, run by the Jesuits, and in 1916 received a diploma from the Arnaldo da Brescia public school in Brescia. His education was often interrupted by bouts of illness.

In 1916, Montini entered the seminary to become a Catholic priest. He was ordained on 29 May 1920 in Brescia and celebrated his first Mass at the Santa Maria delle Grazie, Brescia. Montini concluded his studies in Milan with a laurea, the equivalent of a bachelor's degree, in canon law in 1922. He later studied at the Gregorian University, the University of Rome La Sapienza and, at the request of Giuseppe Pizzardo, the Pontifical Academy of Ecclesiastical Nobles. In 1922, at the age of twenty-five, again at the request of Giuseppe Pizzardo, Montini entered the Secretariat of State, where he worked under Pizzardo together with Francesco Borgongini-Duca, Alfredo Ottaviani, Carlo Grano, Domenico Tardini and Francis Spellman. Consequently, he never had an appointment as a parish priest. In 1925 he helped found the publishing house Morcelliana in Brescia, focused on promoting a 'Christian-inspired culture'.

== Vatican career ==
=== Diplomatic service ===
Montini had just one foreign posting in the diplomatic service of the Holy See as Secretary in the office of the papal nuncio to Poland in 1923. Of the nationalism he experienced there he wrote: "This form of nationalism treats foreigners as enemies, especially foreigners with whom one has common frontiers. Then one seeks the expansion of one's own country at the expense of the immediate neighbours. People grow up with a feeling of being hemmed in. Peace becomes a transient compromise between wars." He described his experience in Warsaw as "useful, though not always joyful". When he became pope, the Communist government of Poland refused him permission to visit Poland on a Marian pilgrimage.

=== Roman Curia ===
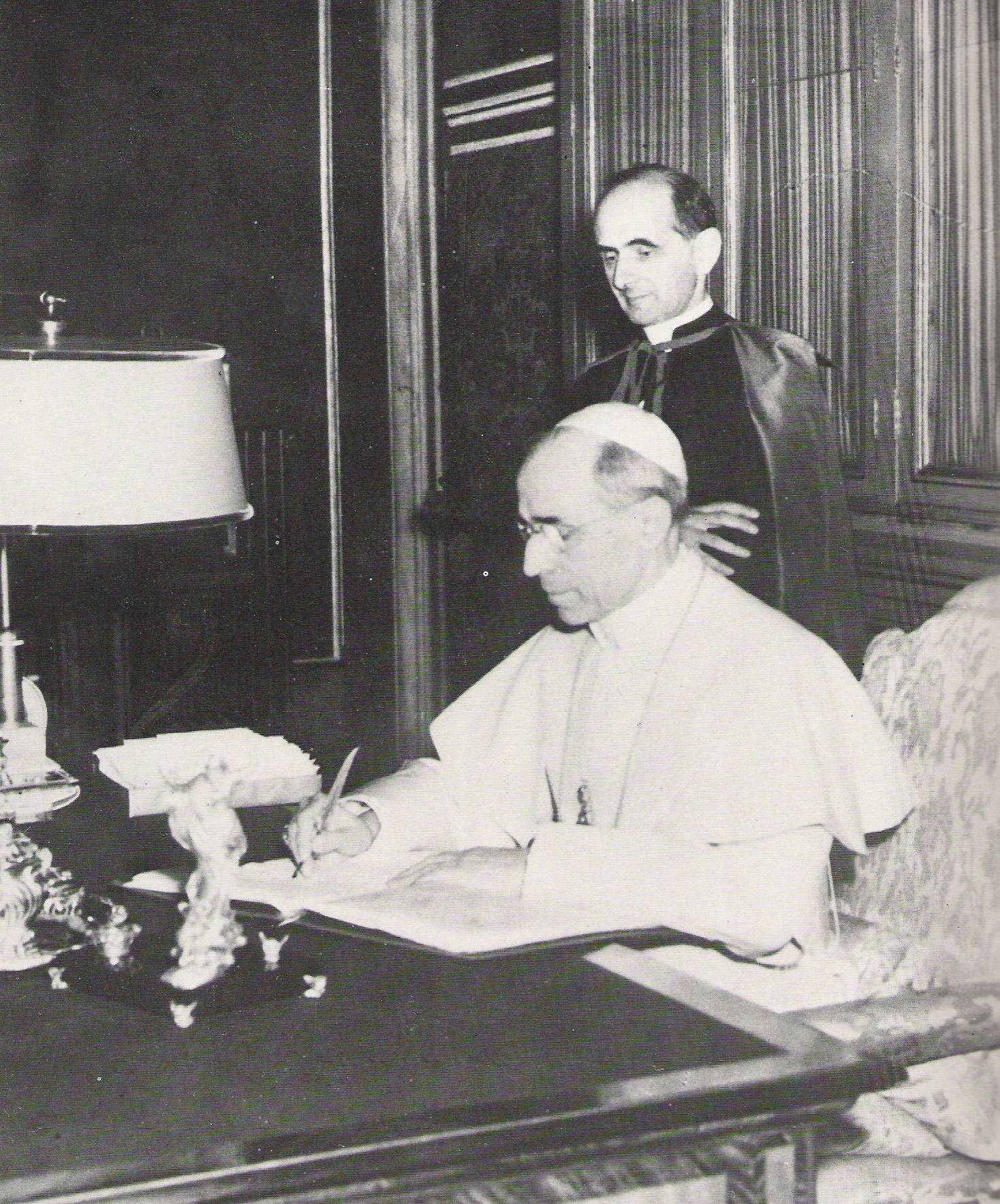
Montini alongside Pope Pius XII during his service at the Secretariat of State

Montini's organisational skills led him to a career in the Roman Curia, the papal civil service. On 19 October 1925, he was appointed a papal chamberlain in the rank of Supernumerary Privy Chamberlain of His Holiness. In 1931, Cardinal Eugenio Pacelli appointed him to teach history at the Pontifical Academy for Diplomats; he was promoted to Domestic Prelate of His Holiness on 8 July of the same year. On 24 September 1936, he was appointed a Referendary Prelate of the Supreme Tribunal of the Apostolic Signatura.

On 16 December 1937, after his mentor Giuseppe Pizzardo was named a cardinal and was succeeded by Domenico Tardini, Montini was named Substitute for Ordinary Affairs under Cardinal Pacelli, the Secretary of State. His immediate supervisor was Domenico Tardini, with whom he got along well. He was further appointed Consultor of the Supreme Sacred Congregation of the Holy Office and of the Sacred Consistorial Congregation on 24 December, and was promoted to Protonotary apostolic (ad instar participantium), the most senior class of papal prelate, on 10 May 1938.

Pacelli became Pope Pius XII in 1939 and confirmed Montini's appointment as Substitute under the new Cardinal Secretary of State Luigi Maglione. In that role, roughly that of a chief of staff, he met the Pope every morning until 1954 and developed a rather close relationship with him. Of his service to two popes he wrote:

It is true, my service to the Pope was not limited to the political or extraordinary affairs according to Vatican language. The goodness of Pope Pius XII opened to me the opportunity to look into the thoughts, even into the soul of this great pontiff. I could quote many details how Pius XII, always using measured and moderate speech, was hiding, nay revealing a noble position of great strength and fearless courage.

When war broke out, Maglione, Tardini, and Montini were the principal figures in the Secretariat of State of the Holy See. Montini dispatched "ordinary affairs" in the morning, while in the afternoon he moved informally to the third floor Office of the Private Secretary of the Pontiff, serving in place of a personal secretary. During the war years, he replied to thousands of letters from all parts of the world with understanding and prayer, and arranging for help when possible.

At the request of the Pope, Montini created an information office regarding prisoners of war and refugees, which from 1939 to 1947 received almost ten million requests for information about missing persons and produced over eleven million replies. Montini was several times attacked by Benito Mussolini's government for meddling in politics, but the Holy See consistently defended him. When Maglione died in 1944, Pius XII appointed Tardini and Montini as joint heads of the Secretariat, each a Pro-Secretary of State. Montini described Pius XII with a filial admiration:

His richly cultivated mind, his unusual capacity for thought and study led him to avoid all distractions and every unnecessary relaxation. He wished to enter fully into the history of his own afflicted time: with a deep understanding, that he was himself a part of that history. He wished to participate fully in it, to share his sufferings in his own heart and soul.

Documents uncovered in 2011 went up for auction and contained, among other items, proof that beginning in September 1950, while then serving as deputy of foreign affairs for the Vatican, Montini worked with former Nazis and members of the Spanish military in planning for an anti-communist mercenary-style army to operate within the African continent. Another revelation was a letter from the priest of former Nazi Lieutenant Colonel Otto Skorzeny to Montini in which the priest praised Montini's efforts to fund, harbour, and give safe passage to former Nazis evading Allied capture and punishment. While the evacuation of Nazi war criminals was mainly organized by pro-Nazi bishop Alois Hudal, Montini also played a key role as the contact person for the Office of Strategic Services (OSS) in the Vatican; similarly to Montini, the OSS saw these former Nazis as allies in combating Communism. Montini continued his cooperation with the American secret services in the post-war years. Most notably, he was deeply involved in the CIA's program to interfere with the 1948 Italian elections and prevent the left from gaining power.

As Pro-Secretary of State, Montini coordinated the activities of assistance to persecuted fugitives hidden in Catholic convents, parishes, seminaries, and schools. At the Pope's instruction, Montini, Ferdinando Baldelli, and Otto Faller established the Pontificia Commissione di Assistenza (Pontifical Commission for Assistance), which supplied a large number of Romans and refugees from everywhere with shelter, food and other necessities. In Rome alone it distributed almost two million portions of free food in 1944. The Papal Residence of Castel Gandolfo was opened to refugees, as was Vatican City in so far as space allowed. Some 15,000 lived in Castel Gandolfo, supported by the Pontificia Commissione di Assistenza. Montini was also involved in the re-establishment of Church Asylum, extending protection to hundreds of Allied soldiers escaped from prison camps, to Jews, anti-Fascists, Socialists, Communists, and after the liberation of Rome, to German soldiers, partisans, displaced persons and others. As pope in 1971, Montini turned the Pontificia Commissione di Assistenza into Caritas Italiana.

== Archbishop of Milan ==
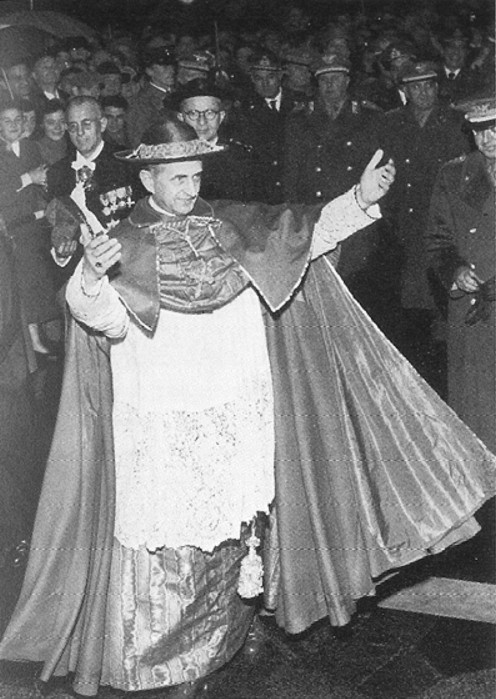
Montini as the Archbishop of Milan, c. 1956

After the death of Cardinal Alfredo Ildefonso Schuster in 1954, Montini was appointed to succeed him as Archbishop of Milan, which made him the secretary of the Italian Bishops Conference. Pius XII presented the new archbishop "as his personal gift to Milan". He was consecrated bishop in Saint Peter's Basilica by Cardinal Eugène Tisserant, the Dean of the College of Cardinals, since Pius XII was severely ill.

On 12 December 1954, Pius XII delivered a radio address from his sick bed about Montini's appointment to the crowd in St. Peter's Basilica. Both Montini and the Pope had tears in their eyes when Montini departed for his diocese with its 1,000 churches, 2,500 priests and 3,500,000 souls. On 5 January 1955, Montini formally took possession of his Cathedral of Milan. Montini settled well into his new tasks among all groups of the faithful in the city, meeting cordially with intellectuals, artists, and writers.

=== Montini's philosophy ===
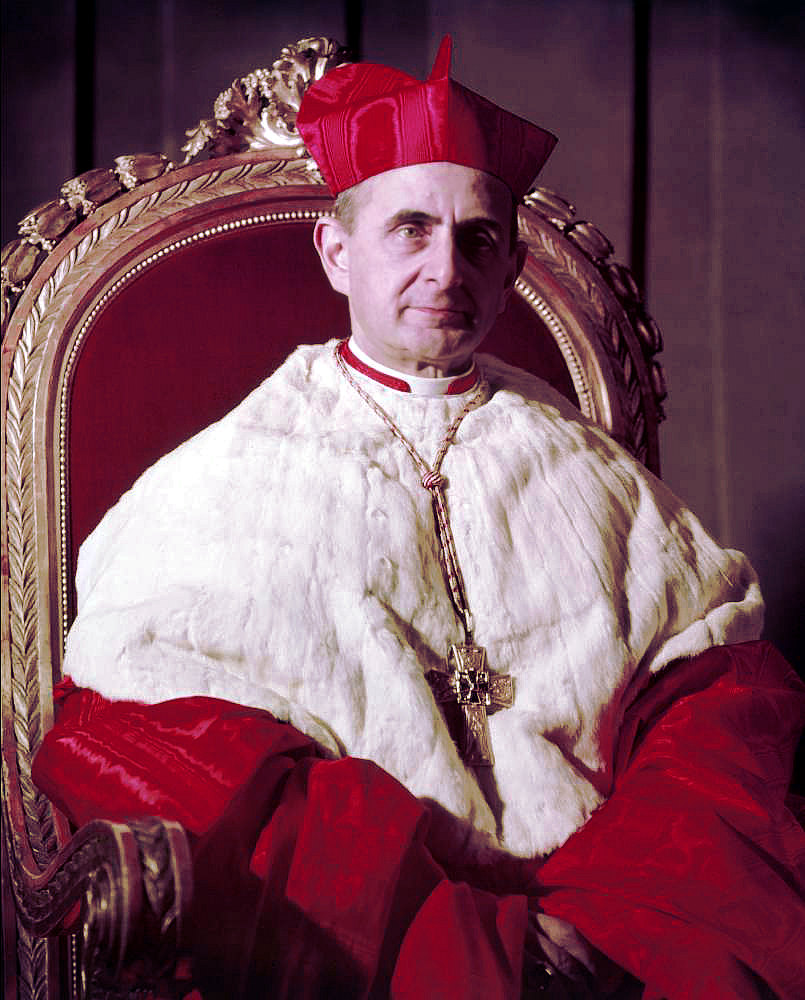
Cardinal Montini in 1959

In his first months, Montini showed his interest in working conditions and labour issues by speaking to many unions and associations. He initiated the building of over 100 new churches, believing them the only non-utilitarian buildings in modern society, places for spiritual rest.

His public speeches were noticed in Milan, Rome, and elsewhere. Some considered him a liberal when he asked lay people to love not only Catholics but also schismatics, Protestants, Anglicans, the indifferent, Muslims, pagans, and atheists. He gave a friendly welcome to a group of Anglican clergy visiting Milan in 1957 and subsequently exchanged letters with the Archbishop of Canterbury, Geoffrey Fisher.

Pope Pius XII revealed at the 1952 secret consistory that both Montini and Tardini had declined appointments to the cardinalate, and, in fact, Montini was never to be made a cardinal by Pius XII, who held no consistory and created no cardinals between the time he appointed Montini to Milan and his own death four years later. After Montini's friend Angelo Roncalli became Pope John XXIII, he made Montini a cardinal in December 1958.

When the new pope announced an ecumenical council, Cardinal Montini reacted with disbelief and said to Giulio Bevilacqua: "This old boy does not know what a hornets nest he is stirring up." Montini was appointed to the Central Preparatory Commission in 1961. During the council, Pope John XXIII asked him to live in the Vatican, where he was a Commission for Extraordinary Affairs member, though he did not engage much in the floor debates. His main advisor was Giovanni Colombo, whom he later appointed as his successor in Milan The commission was significantly overshadowed by the insistence of John XXIII that the Council complete all its work before Christmas 1962, to coincide with the 400th anniversary of the Council of Trent, an insistence which may have also been influenced by the Pope's having recently been told that he had cancer.

John had a vision but "did not have a clear agenda. His rhetoric seems to have had a note of over-optimism, a confidence in progress, which was characteristic of the 1960s."

=== Pastoral progressivism ===
During his period in Milan, Montini was widely seen as a progressive member of the Catholic hierarchy. He adopted new approaches to reach the faithful with pastoral care and carried through the liturgical reforms of Pius XII at the local level. For example, huge posters announced throughout the city that 1,000 voices would speak to them from 10 to 24 November 1957: more than 500 priests and many bishops, cardinals, and lay people delivered 7,000 sermons, not only in churches but in factories, meeting halls, houses, courtyards, schools, offices, military barracks, hospitals, hotels and wherever people congregated. His goal was re-introducing faith to a city without much religion. "If only we can say Our Father and know what this means, then we would understand the Christian faith."

Pius XII asked Archbishop Montini to Rome in October 1957, where he gave the main presentation to the Second World Congress of Lay Apostolate. As Pro-Secretary of State, he had worked hard to form this worldwide organisation of lay people in 58 nations, representing 42 national organisations. He presented them to Pius XII in Rome in 1951. The second meeting in 1957 gave Montini an opportunity to express the lay apostolate in modern terms: "Apostolate means love. We will love all, but especially those, who need help... We will love our time, our technology, our art, our sports, our world."

=== Cardinal ===
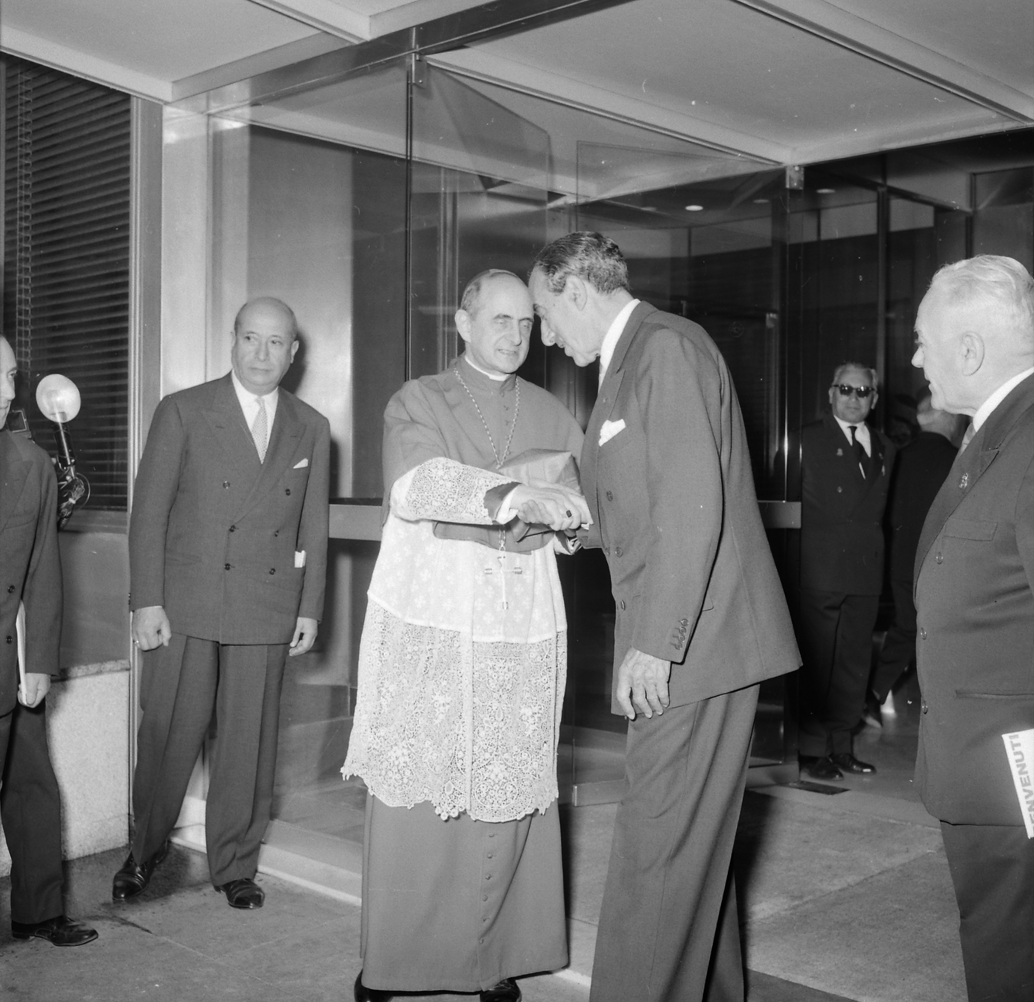
Cardinal Montini at the opening of the new building of the RAS, Milan, 1962; photo by Paolo Monti

On 20 June 1958, Saul Alinsky recalled meeting with Montini: "I had three wonderful meetings with Montini and I am sure that you have heard from him since." Alinsky also wrote to George Nauman Shuster, two days before the papal conclave that elected John XXIII: "No, I don't know who the next Pope will be, but if it's to be Montini, the drinks will be on me for years to come."

Although some cardinals seem to have viewed Montini as a likely papabile candidate, possibly receiving some votes in the 1958 conclave, he had the handicap of not yet being a cardinal. (Note: In theory any male Catholic is eligible for election to the papacy. In fact, his photograph was published in Life magazine with the other potential candidates for the papacy in 1958. However, the cardinals in modern times almost always elect a fellow cardinal to the office.) Angelo Roncalli was elected pope on 28 October 1958 and took the name John XXIII. On 17 November 1958, L'Osservatore Romano announced a consistory for the creation of new cardinals, with Montini at the top of the list. When the Pope raised Montini to the cardinalate on 15 December 1958, he became Cardinal-Priest of Ss. Silvestro e Martino ai Monti. The Pope appointed him simultaneously to several Vatican congregations, drawing him frequently to Rome in the coming years.

Cardinal Montini journeyed to Africa in 1962, visiting Ghana, Sudan, Kenya, Congo, Rhodesia, South Africa, and Nigeria. After this journey, John XXIII called Montini to a private audience to report on his trip, speaking for several hours. In fifteen other trips, he visited Brazil (1960) and the USA (1960), including New York City, Washington DC, Chicago, the University of Notre Dame in Indiana, Boston, Philadelphia, and Baltimore. He usually vacationed in Engelberg Abbey, a secluded Benedictine monastery in Switzerland.

== Papacy ==
=== Papal conclave ===
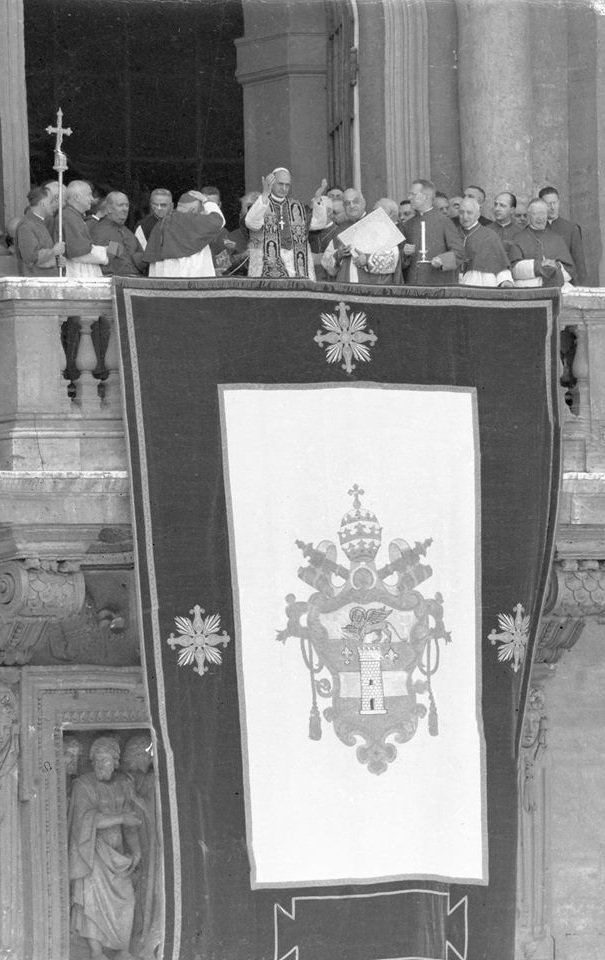
Pope Paul VI appears on the central loggia after his election on 21 June 1963.

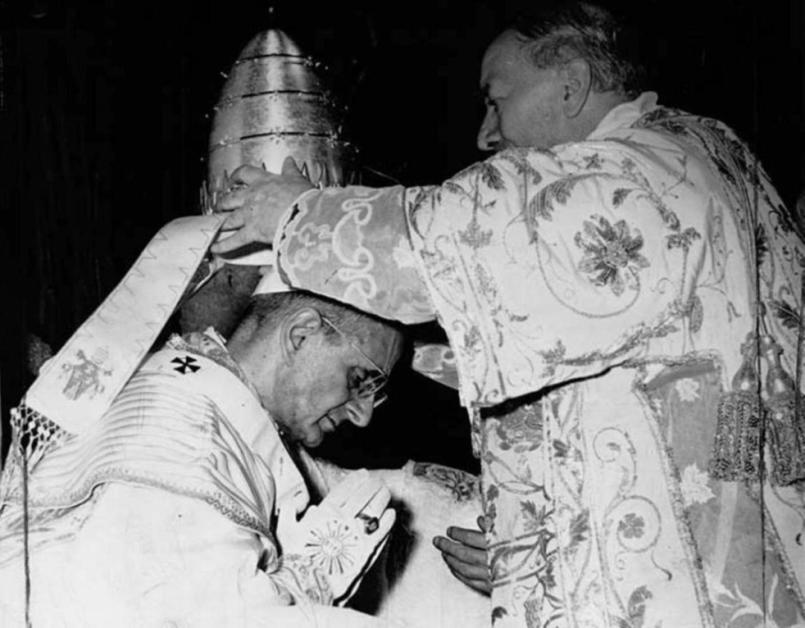
Pope Paul VI crowned by Cardinal Alfredo Ottaviani

Montini was generally seen as the most likely papal successor, owing to his closeness to both Popes Pius XII and John XXIII, as well as his pastoral and administrative background, his insight, and his determination. John XXIII had previously known the Vatican as an official until his appointment to Venice as a papal diplomat, but returning to Rome at age 66, he may at times have felt uncertain in dealing with the professional Roman Curia. Montini, on the other hand, had learned its innermost workings while working in it for a generation.

Unlike the papabile cardinals Giacomo Lercaro of Bologna and Giuseppe Siri of Genoa, Montini was identified neither left nor right nor as a radical reformer. He was viewed as most likely to continue the Second Vatican Council, which had adjourned without tangible results.

In the conclave after John XXIII's death, Montini was elected pope on the sixth ballot on 21 June. When the Dean of the College of Cardinals Eugène Tisserant asked if he accepted the election, Montini said "Accepto, in nomine Domini" ("I accept, in the name of the Lord"). He took the name "Paul VI" in honor of Paul the Apostle.

At one point during the conclave on 20 June, it was said that Cardinal Gustavo Testa lost his temper and demanded that opponents of Montini halt their efforts to thwart his election. Montini, fearful of causing strife, started to rise to dissuade the cardinals from voting for him, but Cardinal Giovanni Urbani dragged him back, muttering, "Eminence, shut up!"

The white smoke first rose from the chimney of the Sistine Chapel at 11:22 am, when Protodeacon Cardinal Alfredo Ottaviani announced to the public the successful election of Montini. When the new pope appeared on the central loggia, he gave the shorter episcopal blessing as his first apostolic blessing rather than the longer, traditional Urbi et Orbi.

Of the papacy, Paul VI wrote in his journal: "The position is unique. It brings great solitude. 'I was solitary before, but now my solitude becomes complete and awesome.'"

Less than two years later, on 2 May 1965, Paul informed the dean of the College of Cardinals that his health might make it impossible to function as pope. He wrote, "In case of infirmity, which is believed to be incurable or is of long duration and which impedes us from sufficiently exercising the functions of our apostolic ministry; or in the case of another serious and prolonged impediment", he would renounce his office "both as bishop of Rome as well as head of the same holy Catholic Church".

=== Reforms of papal ceremony ===
Paul VI did away with much of the papacy's regal splendor. His coronation on 30 June 1963 was the last such ceremony; his successor Pope John Paul I substituted an inauguration (which Paul had substantially modified, but which he left mandatory in his 1975 apostolic constitution Romano Pontifici Eligendo). At his coronation, Paul wore a tiara presented by the Archdiocese of Milan. Near the end of the third session of the Second Vatican Council in 1964, Paul VI descended the steps of the papal throne in St. Peter's Basilica and ascended the altar, on which he laid the tiara as a sign of the renunciation of human glory and power in keeping with the innovative spirit of the council. It was announced that the tiara would be sold for charity. The purchasers arranged for it to be displayed as a gift to American Catholics in the crypt of the Basilica of the National Shrine of the Immaculate Conception in Washington, D.C.

In 1968, with the motu proprio Pontificalis Domus, he discontinued most of the ceremonial functions of the old Papal nobility at the court (reorganized as the household), save for the Prince Assistants to the Papal Throne. He also abolished the Palatine Guard and the Noble Guard, leaving the Pontifical Swiss Guard as the sole military order of the Vatican.

=== Completion of the Vatican Council ===
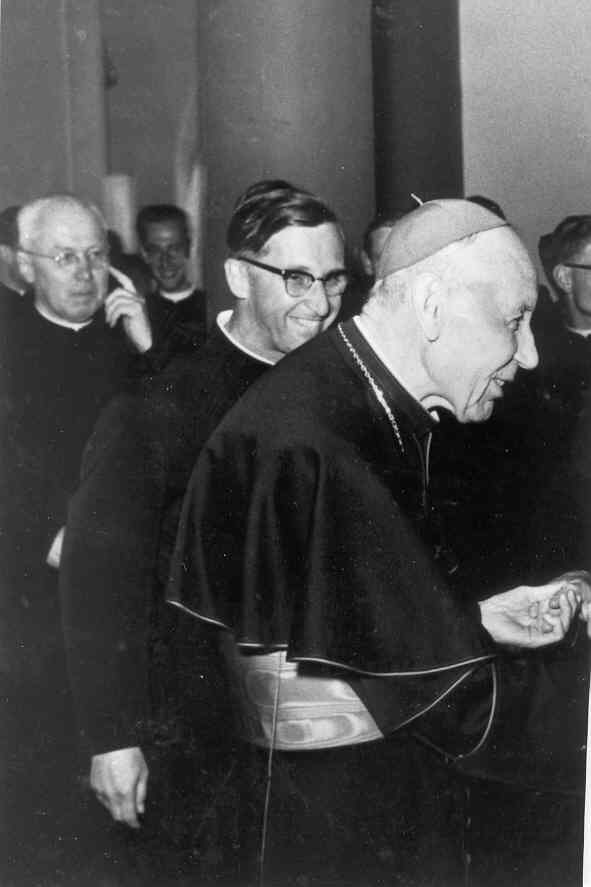
Pope Paul VI fully supported Cardinal Augustin Bea, credited with ecumenical breakthroughs during the Second Vatican Council.

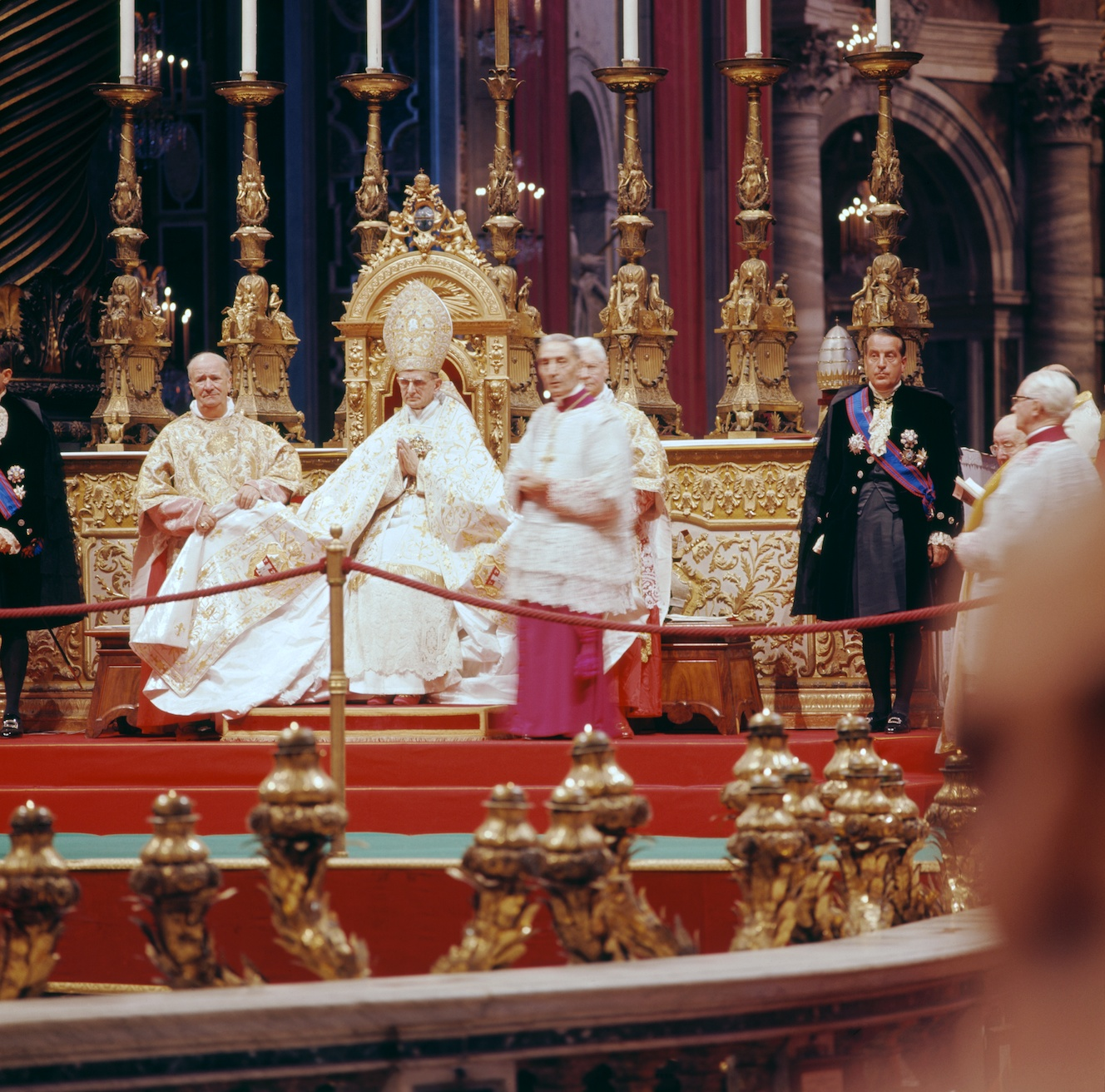
Paul VI during the Second Vatican Council

Paul VI decided to reconvene Vatican II and completed it in 1965. Faced with conflicting interpretations and controversies, he directed the implementation of its reform goals.

==== Ecumenical orientation ====
During Vatican II, the council fathers avoided statements that might anger non-Catholic Christians. Cardinal Augustin Bea, the President of the Christian Unity Secretariat, always had the full support of Paul VI in his attempts to ensure that the Council language was friendly and open to the sensitivities of Protestant and Orthodox churches, whom he had invited to all sessions at the request of Pope John XXIII. Bea also was strongly involved in the passage of Nostra aetate, which regulates the Church's relations with Judaism and members of other religions. (Note: 28 October 1965.)

==== Dialogue with the world ====
After being elected Bishop of Rome, Paul VI first met with the priests in his new diocese. He told them that he started a dialogue with the modern world in Milan and asked them to seek contact with people from all walks of life. Six days after his election, he announced that he would continue Vatican II and convened the opening on 29 September 1963. In a radio address to the world, Paul VI praised his predecessors, the strength of Pius XI, the wisdom and intelligence of Pius XII, and the love of John XXIII. As his pontifical goals, he mentioned the continuation and completion of Vatican II, the Canon Law reform, and improved social peace and justice worldwide. The unity of Christianity would be central to his activities.

==== Council priorities ====
The Pope re-opened the Ecumenical Council on 29 September 1963, giving it four key priorities:

- A better understanding of the Catholic Church
- Church reforms
- Advancing the unity of Christianity
- Dialogue with the world

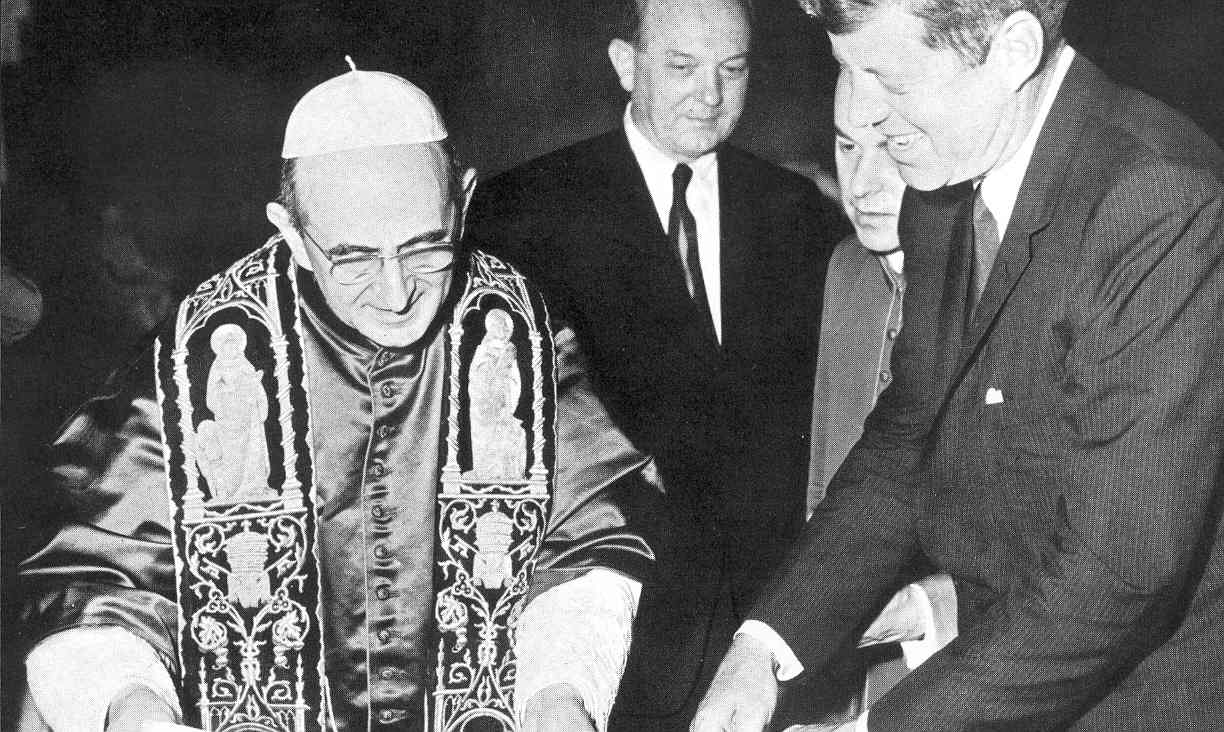
Pope Paul VI meets with the first Catholic U.S. president, John F. Kennedy, 2 July 1963.

He reminded the Council Fathers that only a few years earlier, Pope Pius XII had issued the encyclical Mystici corporis about the mystical body of Christ. He asked them not to repeat or create new dogmatic definitions but to simply explain how the Church sees itself. He thanked the representatives of other Christian communities for their attendance and asked for their forgiveness if the Catholic Church was at fault for their separation. He also reminded the Council Fathers that many bishops from the East had been forbidden to attend by their national governments.

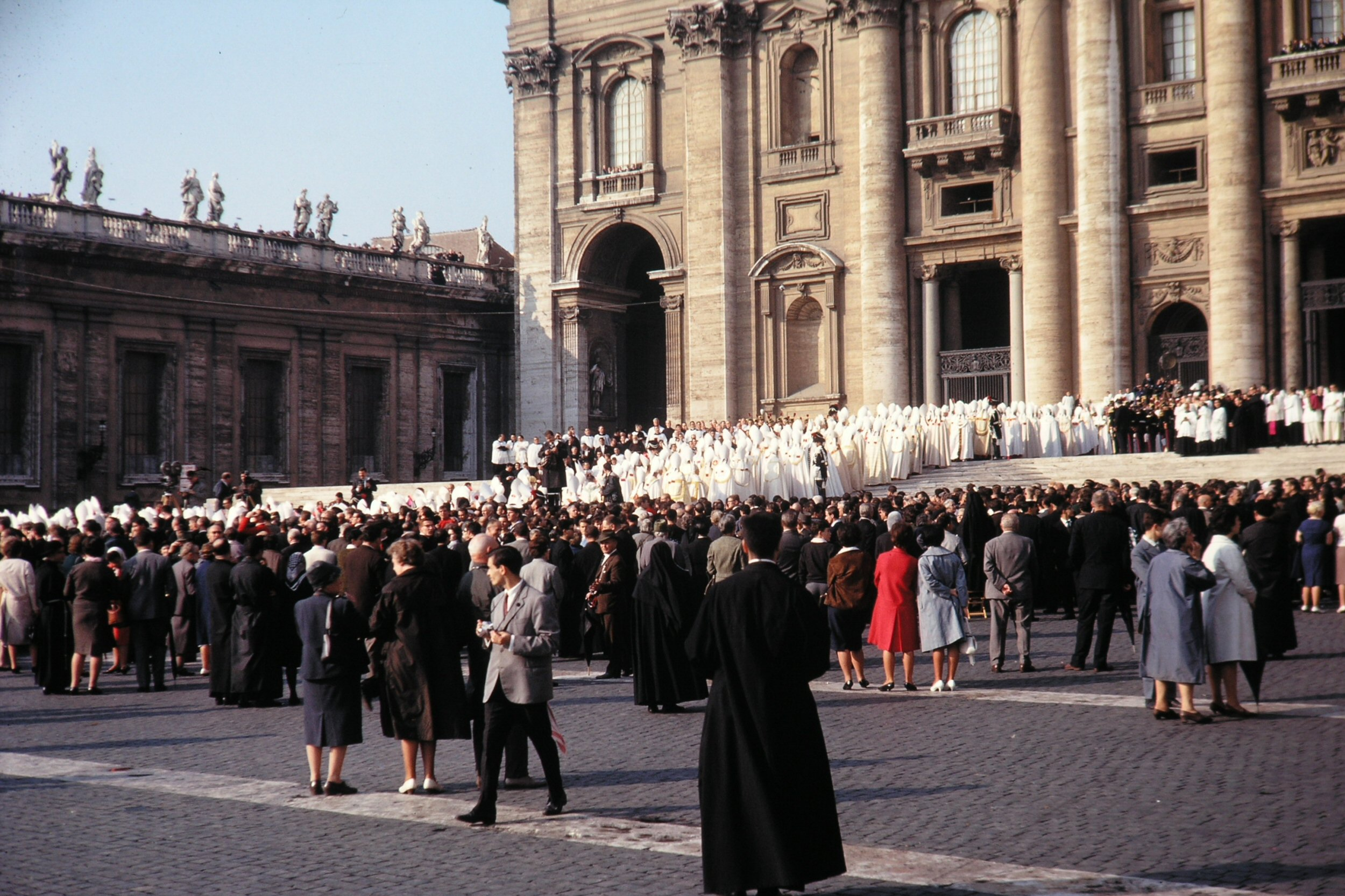
The opening of the second session of Vatican II

==== Third and fourth sessions ====
Paul VI opened the third period on 14 September 1964, telling the Council Fathers that he viewed the text about the Church as the most important document to come out from the council. As the Council discussed the role of bishops in the papacy, Paul VI issued an explanatory note confirming the primacy of the papacy, a step that was viewed by some as meddling in the council's affairs. American bishops pushed for a speedy resolution on religious freedom, but Paul VI insisted this be approved together with related texts on topics such as ecumenism. The Pope concluded the session on 21 November 1964 with the formal pronouncement of Mary as Mother of the Church.

Between the third and fourth sessions, the Pope announced reforms in the areas of Roman Curia, revision of Canon law, regulations for interfaith marriages, and birth control issues. He opened the council's final session, concelebrating with bishops from countries where the Church was persecuted. Several texts proposed for his approval had to be changed, but all were finally agreed upon. The council was concluded on 8 December 1965: the Feast of the Immaculate Conception.

In the council's final session, Paul VI announced that he would open the canonisation processes of his immediate predecessors: Pope Pius XII and Pope John XXIII.

==== Universal call to holiness ====
According to Paul VI, "the most characteristic and ultimate purpose of the teachings of the Council" is the universal call to holiness: "all the faithful of Christ of whatever rank or status, are called to the fullness of the Christian life and to the perfection of charity; by this holiness as such a more human manner of living is promoted in this earthly society." This teaching is found in Lumen Gentium, the Dogmatic Constitution on the Church, promulgated by Paul VI on 21 November 1964.

=== Church reforms ===
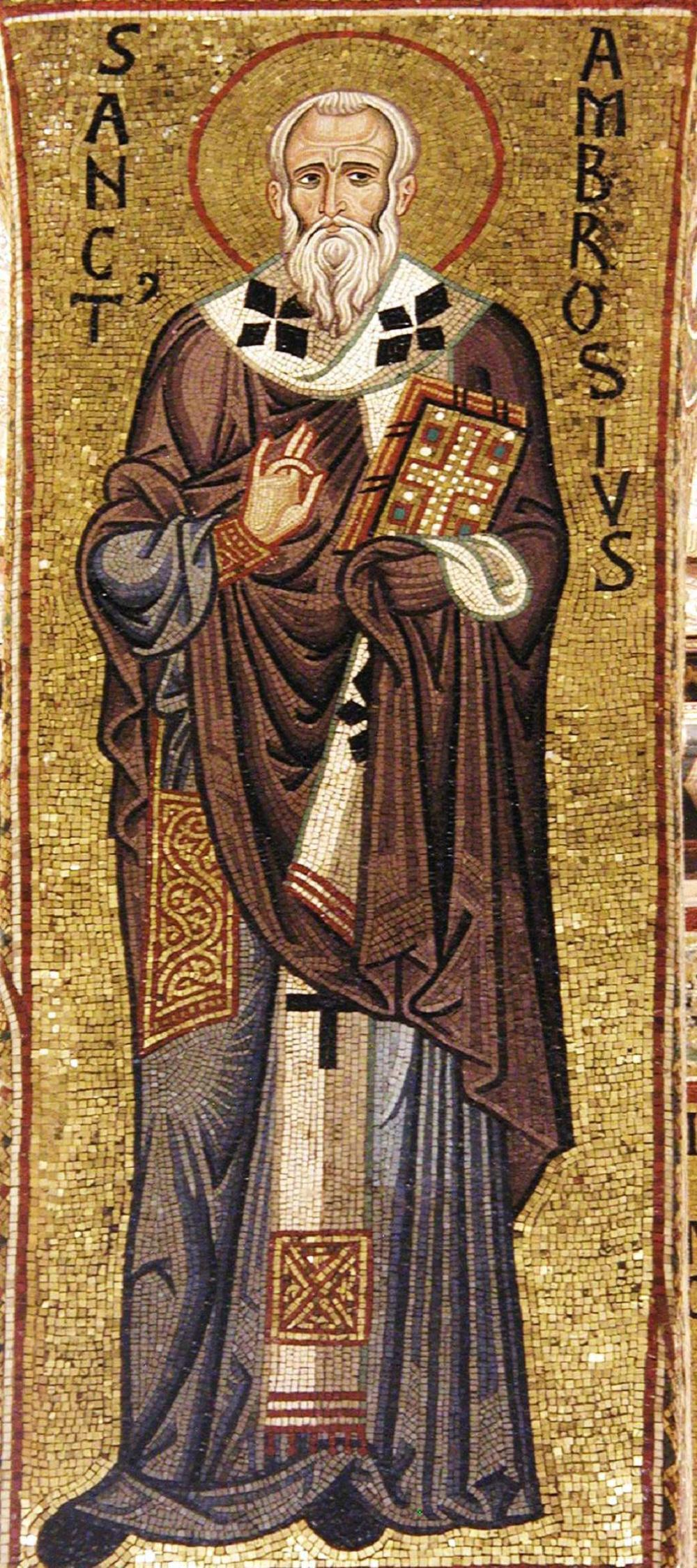
Following his predecessor Ambrose of Milan, Pope Paul VI named Mary the "Mother of the Church" during Vatican II.

==== Synod of Bishops ====
On 14 September 1965, he established the Synod of Bishops as a permanent institution of the Catholic Church and an advisory body to the papacy. Several meetings were held on specific issues during his pontificate, such as the Synod of Bishops on evangelization in the modern world, which started on 9 September 1974.

==== Curia reform ====
Pope Paul VI knew the Roman Curia well, having worked there for a generation from 1922 to 1954. He implemented his reforms in stages. On 1 March 1968, he issued a regulation, a process initiated by Pius XII and continued by John XXIII. On 28 March, with Pontificalis Domus, and in several additional Apostolic Constitutions in the following years, he revamped the entire Curia, which included reduction of bureaucracy, streamlining of existing congregations, and a broader representation of non-Italians in the Curial positions.

==== Age limits and restrictions ====
On 6 August 1966, Paul VI asked all bishops to submit their resignations to the pontiff by their 75th birthday. They were not required to do so but "earnestly requested of their own free will to tender their resignation from office". He extended this request to all cardinals in Ingravescentem aetatem on 21 November 1970, with the further provision that cardinals would relinquish their offices in the Roman Curia upon reaching their 80th birthday. These retirement rules enabled the Pope to fill several positions with younger prelates and reduce the Italian domination of the Roman Curia. His 1970 measures also revolutionised papal elections by restricting the right to vote in papal conclaves to cardinals who had not yet reached their 80th birthday, a class known since then as "cardinal electors". This reduced the power of the Italians and the Curia in the next conclave. Some senior cardinals objected to losing their voting privilege without effect. Paul VI's measures also limited the number of cardinal electors to a maximum of 120, a rule disregarded on several occasions by each of his successors. Previously, Paul VI himself had been the first pope to increase the number above 120 (from 82 in 1963 to 134 in April 1969; but he reduced the number of cardinal electors below 120 in 1971 by simultaneously introducing the voting age limit).

Some prelates questioned whether he should not apply these retirement rules to himself. When Pope Paul was asked towards the end of his papacy whether he would retire at age 80, he replied "Kings can abdicate, Popes cannot."

==== Liturgy ====
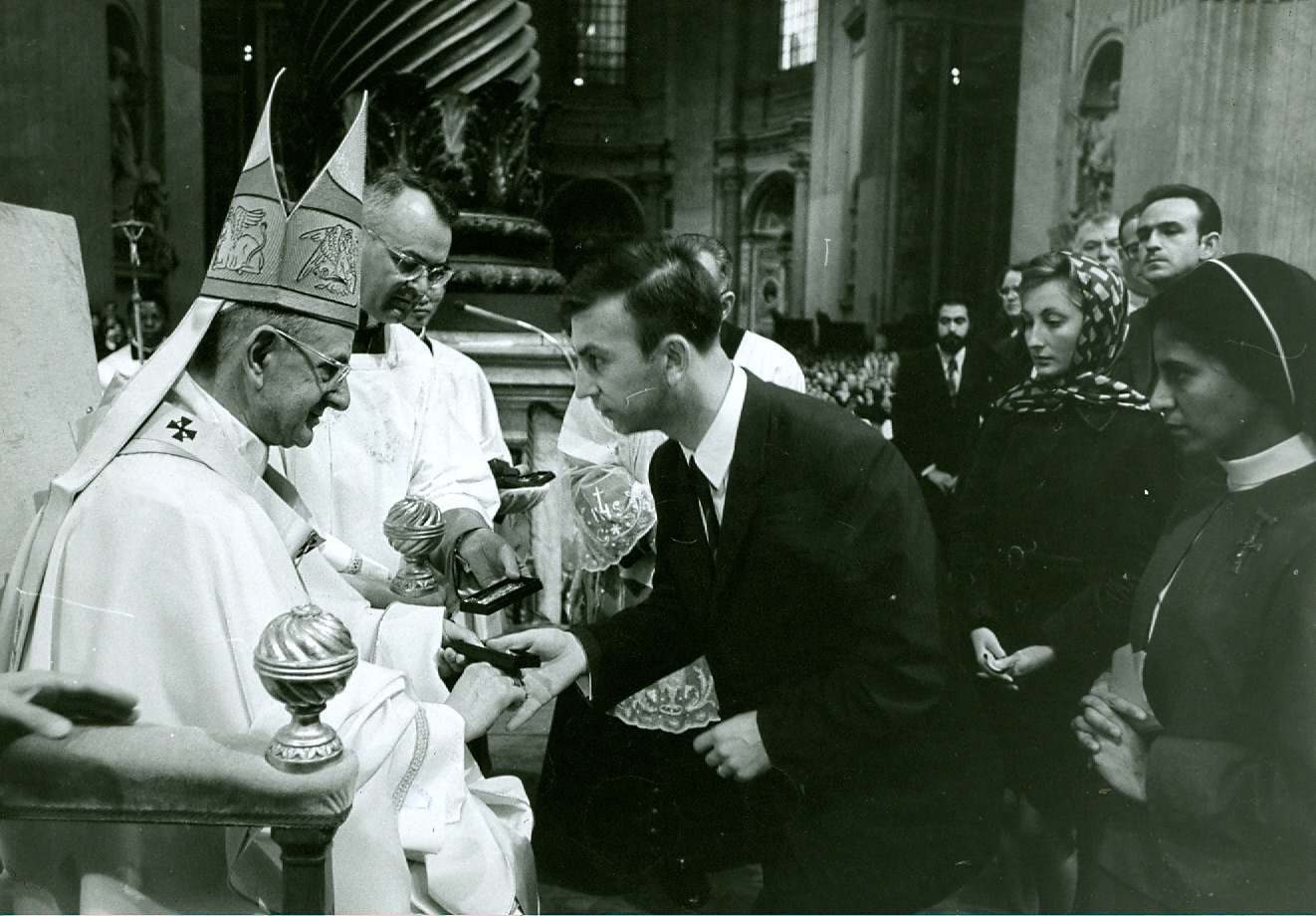
Paul VI celebrates Mass on the occasion of World Missionary Day in 1971

Reform of the liturgy, an aim of the 20th-century liturgical movement, mainly in France and Germany, was officially recognised as legitimate by Pius XII in his encyclical Mediator Dei. During his pontificate, he eased regulations on the obligatory use of Latin in Catholic liturgies, permitting some use of vernacular languages during baptisms, funerals, and other events. In 1951 and 1955, he revised the Easter liturgies, most notably that of the Easter Triduum. The Second Vatican Council (1962–1965) gave some directives in its document Sacrosanctum Concilium for a general revision of the Roman Missal. Within four years of the close of the council, Paul VI promulgated in 1969 the first postconciliar edition, which included three new Eucharistic Prayers in addition to the Roman Canon, until then the only anaphora in the Roman Rite. Use of vernacular languages was expanded by decision of episcopal conferences, not by papal command. In addition to his revision of the Roman Missal, Pope Paul VI issued instructions in 1964, 1967, 1968, 1969, and 1970, reforming other elements of the liturgy of the Roman Church.

Among the revisions of the Roman Rite were as follows:

- The rites of the ordination of a deacon, a priest and a bishop (18 June 1968);
- The General Roman calendar (14 February 1969);
- The Roman Missal renewed in accordance with the decree of the Vatican Ecumenical Council II (3 April 1969);
- The rite of children's baptism (15 May 1969);
- The funeral rite (15 August 1969);
- The rite of the profession of a nun (2 February 1970);
- The Liturgy of the Hours, in succession to the Breviarium Romanum (1 November 1970);
- The rite of the sacrament of confirmation (15 August 1971);
- The discipline of the tonsure, of the minor orders, and of the subdiaconate (15 August 1972);
- The rite of the anointing of the sick (30 November 1972);
- The rite of penance (2 December 1973).

These reforms were not universally welcomed. Questions were raised about the need to replace the 1962 Roman Missal, which, though decreed on 23 June 1962, became available only in 1963, a few months before the Second Vatican Council's Sacrosanctum Concilium decree ordered that it be altered. Attachment to it led to open ruptures, of which the most widely known is that of Marcel Lefebvre. Pope John Paul II granted bishops the right to authorise the use of the 1962 Missal (Quattuor abhinc annos and Ecclesia Dei) and in 2007 Pope Benedict XVI, while stating that the Mass of Paul VI and John Paul II "obviously is and continues to be the normal Form – the Forma ordinaria – of the Eucharistic Liturgy", gave general permission to priests of the Latin Church to use either the 1962 Missal or the post-Vatican II Missal both privately and, under certain conditions, publicly. In 2021, Pope Francis removed many of faculties granted by Pope Benedict XVI with the publishing of his motu proprio, Traditionis Custodes, thus limiting the use of 1962 Roman Missal.

=== Relations and dialogues ===
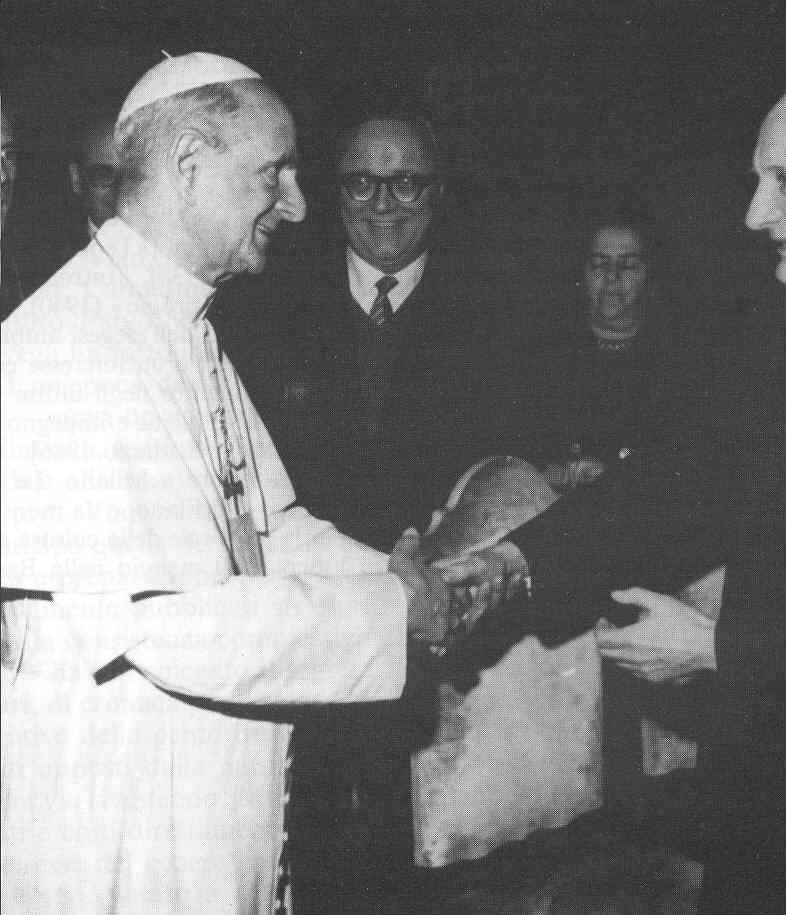
Pope Paul VI during an October 1973 audience

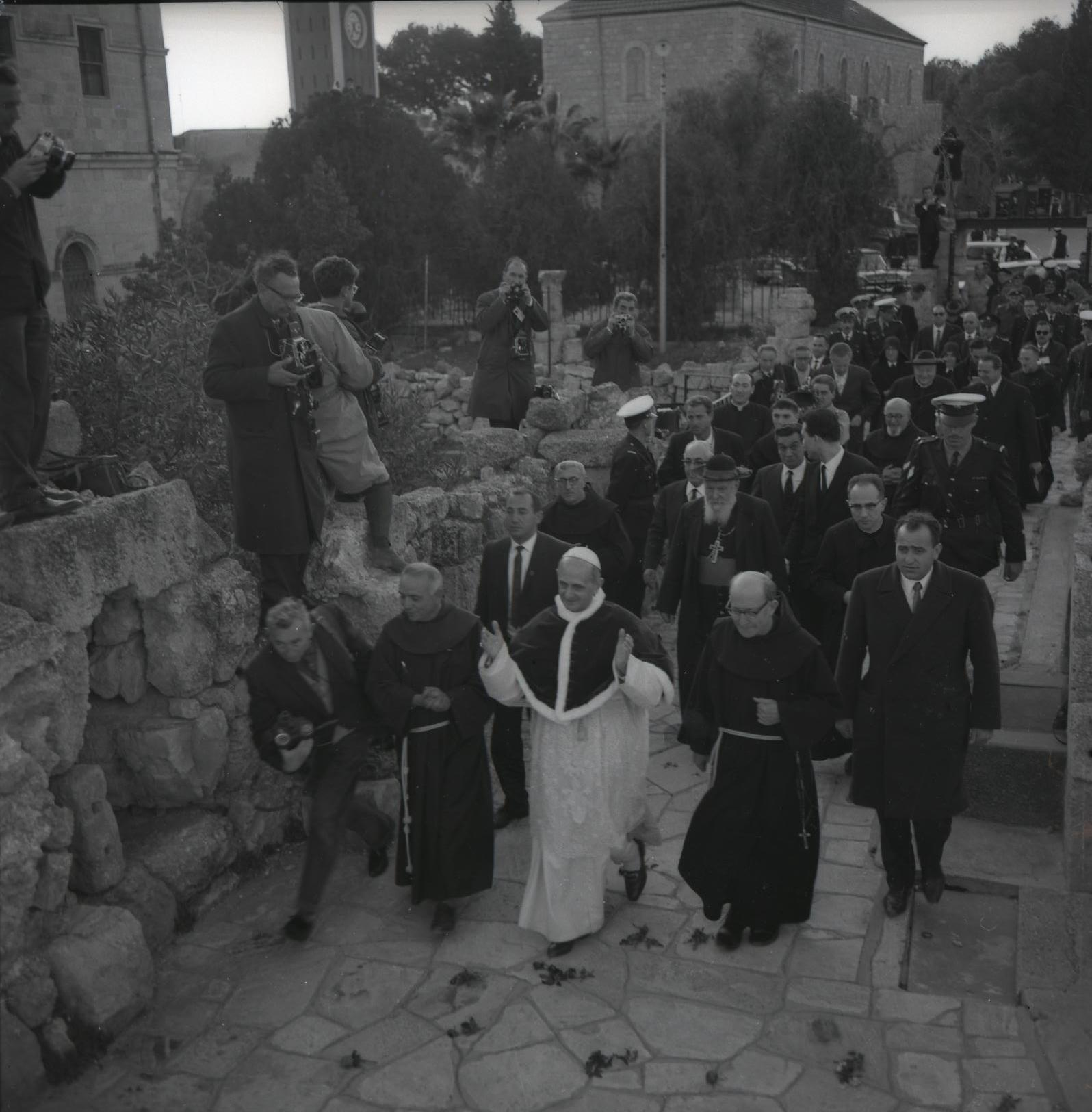
Pope Paul VI at Mount Tabor, during his 1964 visit to Israel

To Paul VI, a dialogue with all of humanity was essential not as an aim but as a means to find the truth. According to Paul, dialogue is based on the full equality of all participants. This equality is rooted in the common search for the truth. He said: "Those who have the truth, are in a position as not having it, because they are forced to search for it every day in a deeper and more perfect way. Those who do not have it, but search for it with their whole heart, have already found it."

==== Dialogues ====
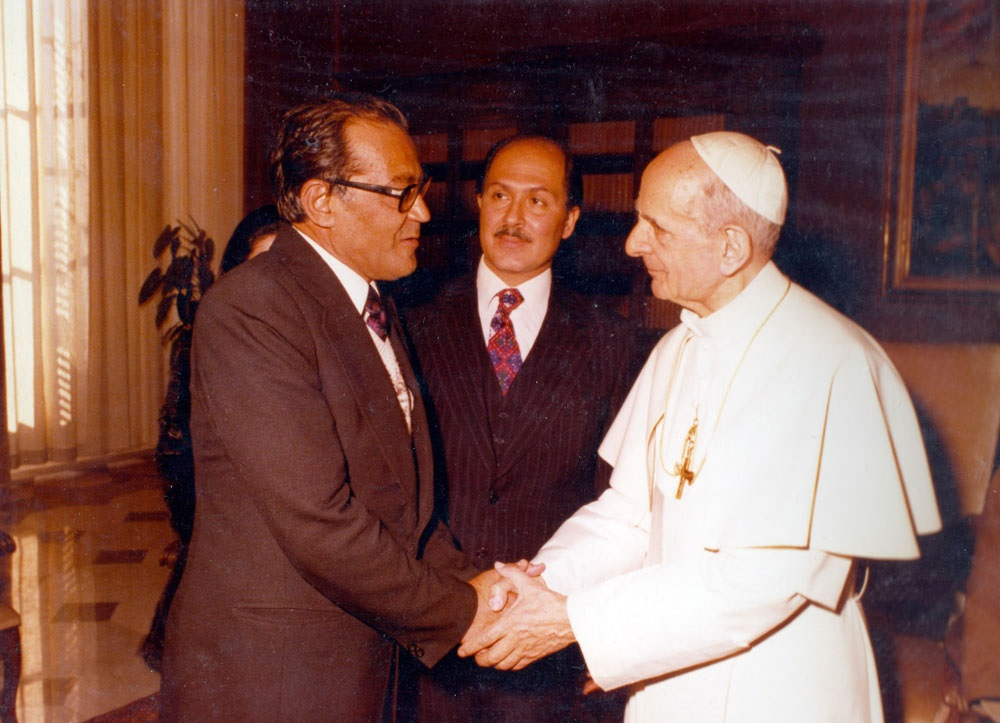
Pope Paul VI meets Jafar Shahidi and Hossein Nasr, Iranian Shia scholars.

In 1964, Paul VI created a Secretariat for non-Christians, later renamed the Pontifical Council for Interreligious Dialogue, and a year later, a new Secretariat (later Pontifical Council) for Dialogue with Non-Believers. This latter one was in 1993 incorporated by Pope John Paul II in the Pontifical Council for Culture, which he had established in 1982. In 1971, Paul VI created a papal office for economic development and catastrophic assistance. To foster common bonds with all persons of goodwill, he decreed an annual peace day to be celebrated on 1 January every year. Trying to improve the condition of Christians behind the Iron Curtain, Paul VI engaged in dialogue with Communist authorities at several levels, receiving Foreign Minister Andrei Gromyko and Chairman of the Presidium of the Supreme Soviet Nikolai Podgorny in 1966 and 1967 in the Vatican. The situation of the Church in Hungary, Poland, and Romania improved during his pontificate.

==== Foreign travels ====
The countries visited by Pope Paul VI

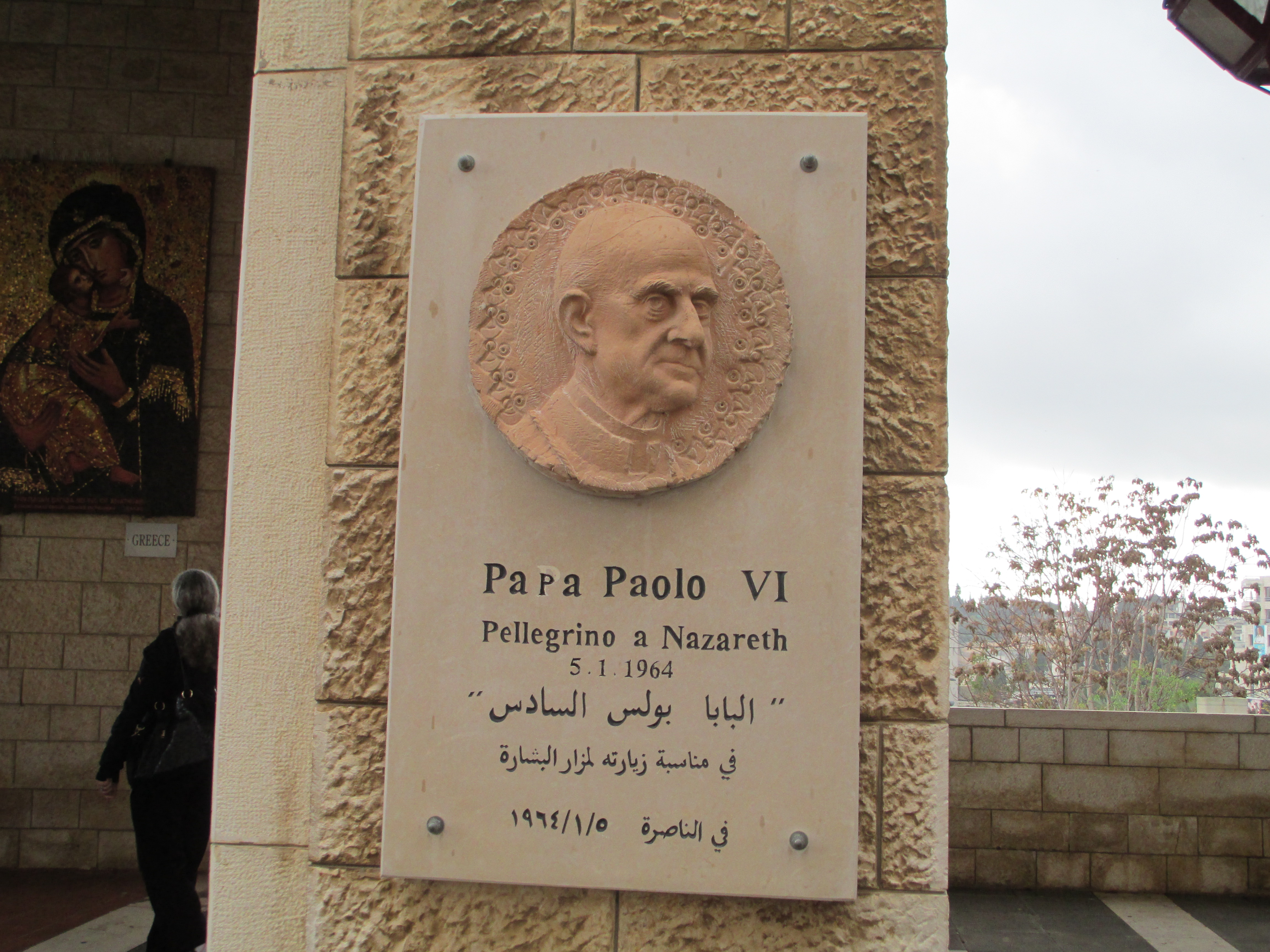
Relief commemorating Pope Paul VI's visit to Nazareth, 5 January 1964

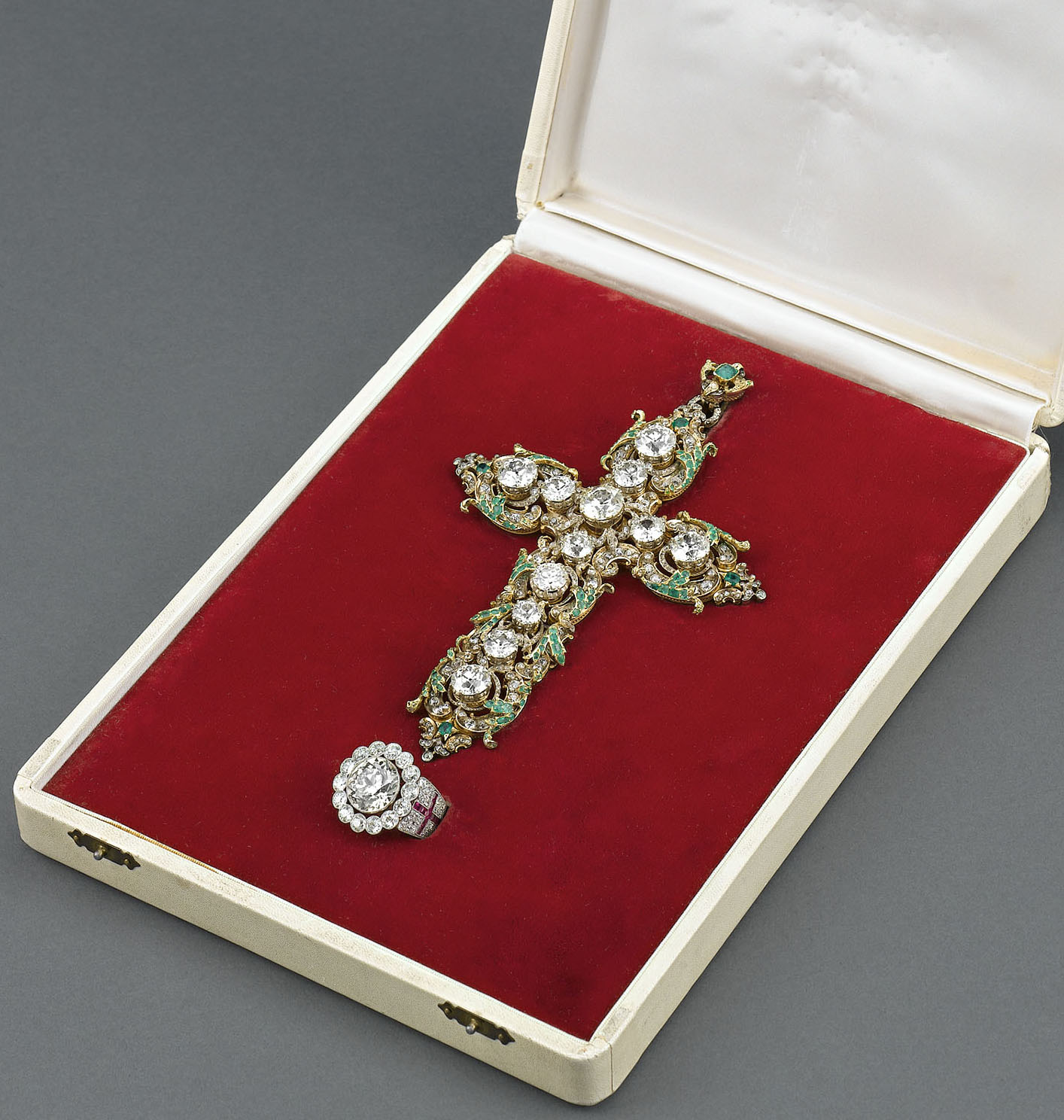
Pope Paul VI's diamond ring and cross donated to the United Nations

Pope Paul VI became the first pope to visit six continents. He was also the first pontiff to travel on an airplane, visit the Holy Land on pilgrimage, and travel outside Italy in a century. He travelled more widely than any of his predecessors, earning the nickname "the Pilgrim Pope". He visited the Holy Land in 1964 and participated in Eucharistic congresses in Bombay, India, and Bogotá, Colombia. In 1966, he was twice denied permission to visit Poland for the thousandth anniversary of the introduction of Christianity in Poland. In 1967, he visited the shrine of Our Lady of Fátima in Portugal on the fiftieth anniversary of the apparitions there. He undertook a pastoral visit to Uganda in 1969, the first by a reigning pope to Africa. Pope Paul VI became the first reigning pontiff to visit the Western hemisphere when he addressed the United Nations in New York City in October 1965. (Note: As a gesture of goodwill, the Pope gave to the UN two pieces of papal jewellery, a diamond cross and ring, with the hopes that the proceeds from their sale at auction would contribute to the UN's efforts to end human suffering.) As the U.S. involvement in the Vietnam War was escalating, Paul VI pleaded for peace before the U.N.:

Our very brief visit has given us a great honour; that of proclaiming to the whole world, from the Headquarters of the United Nations, Peace! We shall never forget this extraordinary hour. Nor can We bring it to a more fitting conclusion than by expressing the wish that this central seat of human relationships for the civil peace of the world may ever be conscious and worthy of this high privilege.

No more war, never again war. Peace, it is peace that must guide the destinies of people and of all mankind."

=== Attempted assassination ===
Shortly after arriving at Manila International Airport, the Philippines on 27 November 1970, the Pope, closely followed by President Ferdinand Marcos and personal aide Pasquale Macchi, who was private secretary to Pope Paul VI, were encountered suddenly by a crew-cut, cassock-clad man who tried to attack the Pope with a knife. Macchi pushed the man away; police identified the would-be assassin as Benjamín Mendoza y Amor Flores of La Paz, Bolivia. Mendoza was an artist living in the Philippines. The Pope continued his trip and thanked Marcos and Macchi, who had moved to protect him during the attack.

=== New diplomacy ===
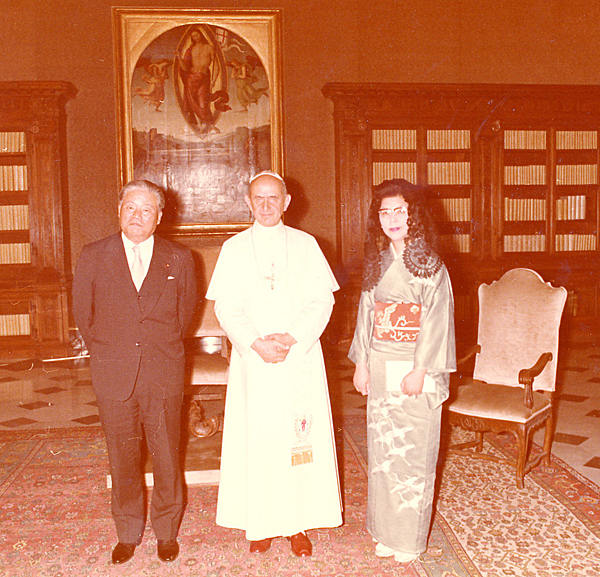
Pope Paul VI meeting with Japanese Foreign Minister Ōhira Masayoshi and his wife in September 1973

Like his predecessor Pius XII, Paul VI put much emphasis on the dialogue with all nations of the world through establishing diplomatic relations. The number of foreign embassies accredited to the Vatican doubled during his pontificate. This was a reflection of a new understanding between church and state, which had been formulated first by Pius XI and Pius XII but decreed by Vatican II. The pastoral constitution Gaudium et spes stated that the Catholic Church is not bound to any form of government and is willing to cooperate with all forms. The Church maintained its right to select bishops on its own without any interference by the State.

Pope Paul VI sent one of 73 Apollo 11 Goodwill Messages to NASA for the historic first lunar landing. The message still rests on the lunar surface. It has the words of the 8th Psalm, and the Pope wrote, "To the Glory of the name of God who gives such power to men, we ardently pray for this wonderful beginning."

=== Theology ===
==== Mariology ====
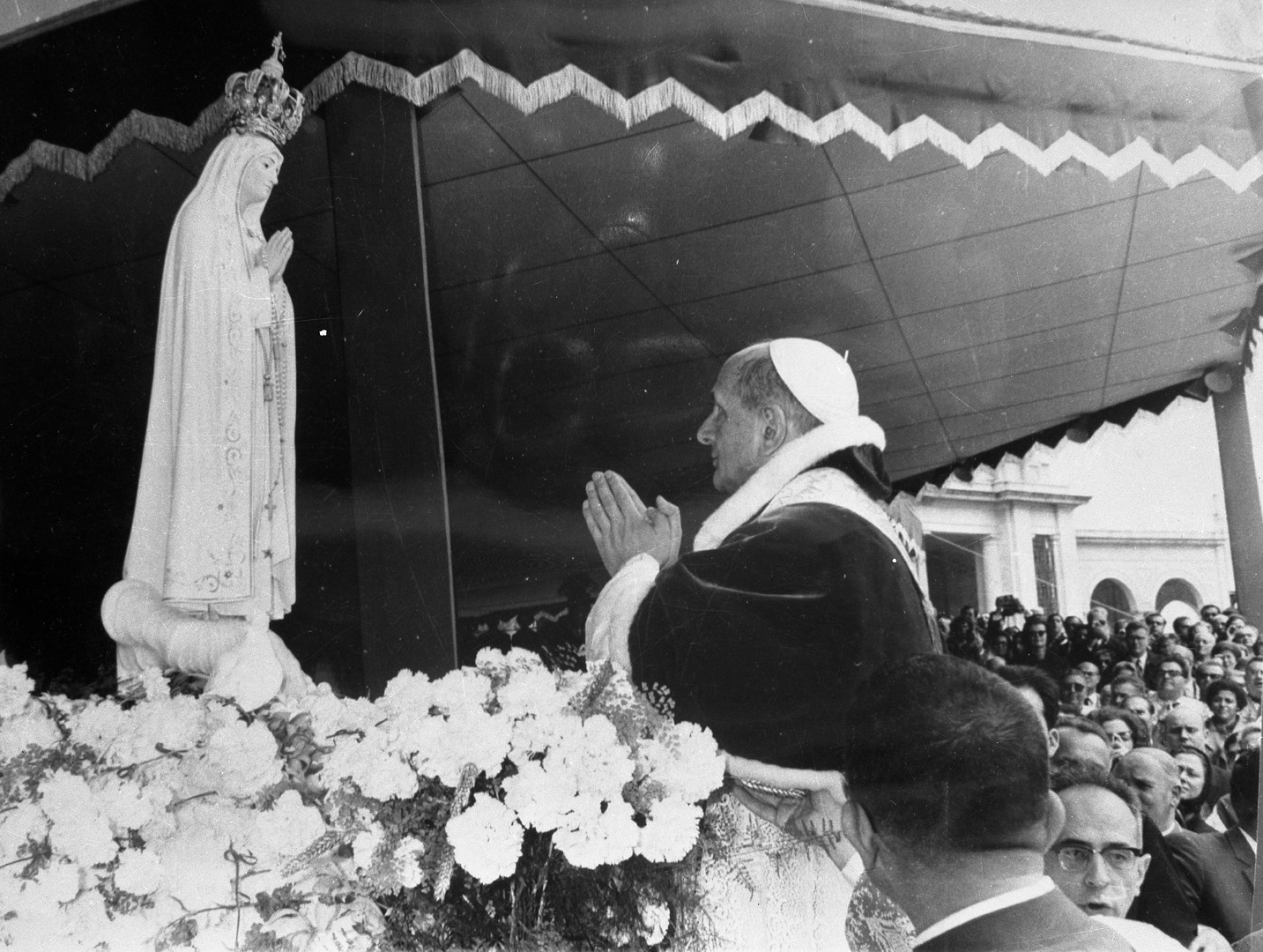
Paul VI during his visit to the Sanctuary of Fátima in 1967

Pope Paul VI made extensive contributions to Mariology (theological teaching and devotions) during his pontificate. Given its new ecumenical orientation, he attempted to present the Marian teachings of the church. In his inaugural encyclical Ecclesiam suam (section below), the Pope called Mary the ideal of Christian perfection. He regards "devotion to the Mother of God as of paramount importance in living the life of the Gospel."

==== Encyclicals ====
Paul VI authored seven encyclicals.

Ecclesiam suam was given at St. Peter's Basilica, Rome, on the Feast of the Transfiguration, 6 August 1964, the second year of his pontificate. Paul VI appealed to "all people of good will" and discussed necessary dialogues within the Church, between the churches, and with atheism.

The encyclical Mense maio (from 29 April 1965) focused on the Virgin Mary, to whom traditionally the month of May is dedicated as the Mother of God. Paul VI writes that Mary is rightly regarded as how people are led to Christ. Therefore, the person who encounters Mary cannot help but encounter Christ.

On 3 September 1965, Paul VI issued Mysterium fidei, on the Eucharist. The encyclical critiques certain contemporary Eucharistic theologies and liturgical practices perceived to undermine traditional Catholic doctrine. The Church, according to Paul VI, has no reason to give up the deposit of faith in such a vital matter.

On 15 September 1966, Paul VI issued Christi Matri, a request for the faithful to pray for peace during October 1966. As reasons for this call to prayer, Paul VI alludes to the Vietnam War and lists concern about "the growing nuclear armaments race, the senseless nationalism, the racism, the obsession for revolution, the separations imposed upon citizens, the nefarious plots, the slaughter of innocent people."

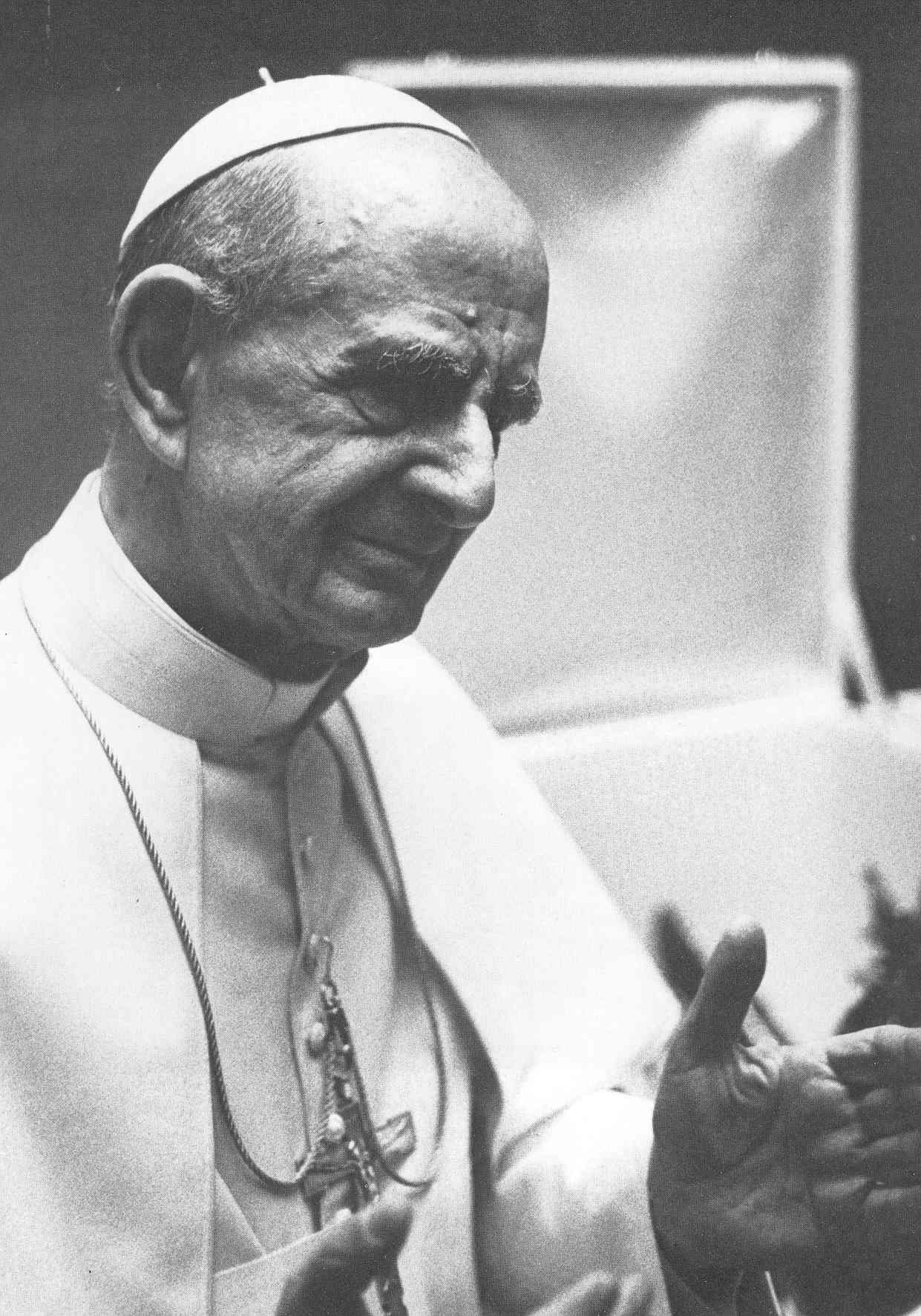
Paul VI at an audience in October 1977

Populorum progressio, released on 26 March 1967, dealt with "the development of peoples" and that the world's economy should serve humanity and not just a few. It develops traditional principles of Catholic social teaching, including the right to a just wage, the right to security of employment, the right to fair and reasonable working conditions, the right to join a union, and the universal destination of goods.

In addition, Populorum progressio opines that real peace in the world is conditional on justice. He repeated his demands expressed in Bombay in 1964 for a large-scale World Development Organization as a matter of international justice and peace. He rejected notions of instigating revolution and force in changing economic conditions.

Sacerdotalis caelibatus (Latin for "Of the celibate priesthood"), promulgated on 24 June 1967, defends the Catholic Church's tradition of priestly celibacy in the West. Written in response to postconciliar questioning of the discipline of clerical celibacy, the encyclical reaffirms the historical ecclesiastical discipline that because celibacy is an ideal state, it continues to be mandatory for priests. To Catholic conceptions of the priesthood, celibacy symbolizes the reality of the kingdom of God amid modern society. The priestly celibacy is closely linked to the sacramental priesthood. However, during his pontificate, Paul VI was permissive in allowing bishops to grant laicisation of priests who wanted to leave the sacerdotal state. John Paul II changed this policy in 1980, and the 1983 Code of Canon Law made it explicit that only the Pope can, in exceptional circumstances, grant laicization.

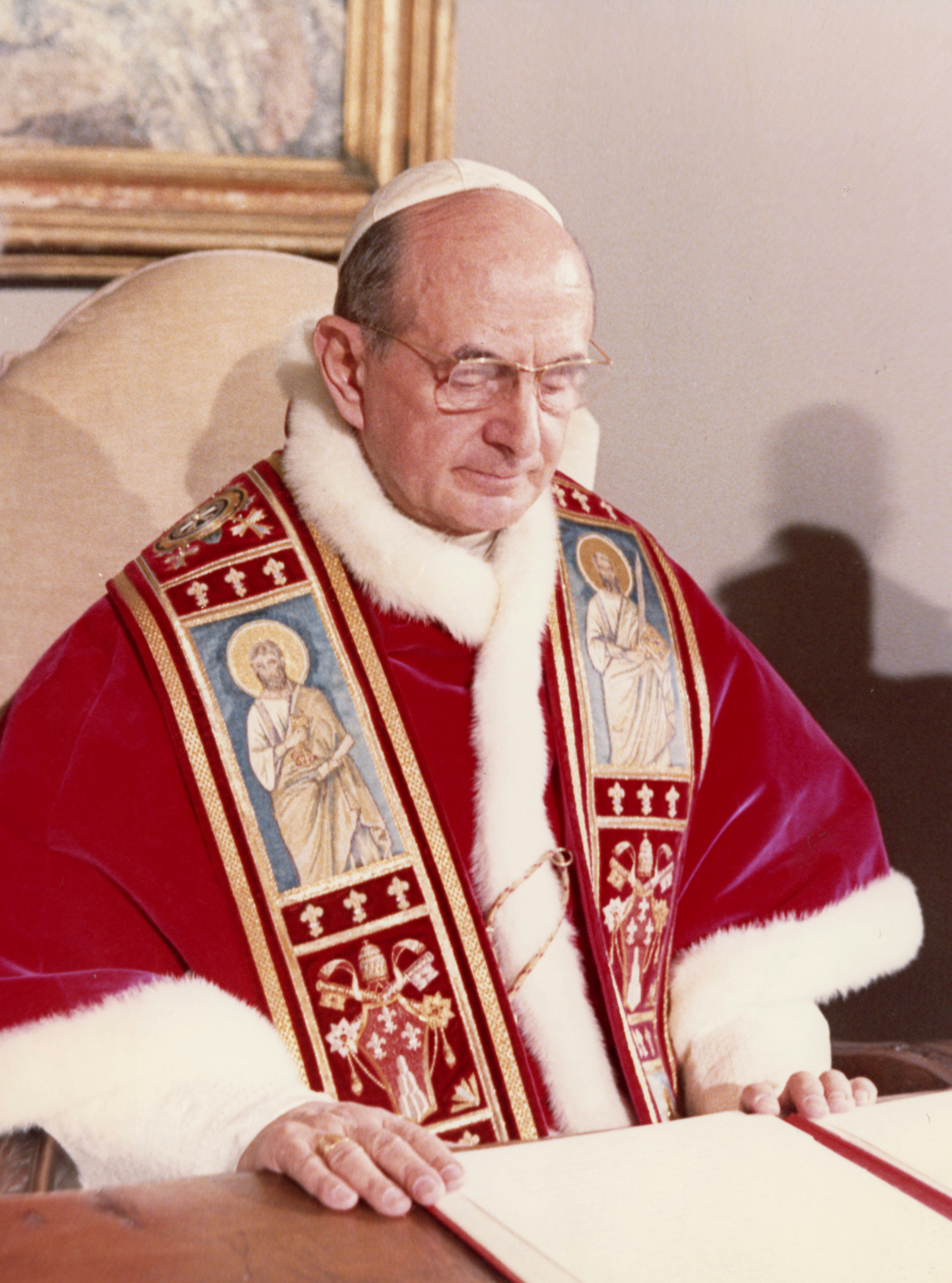
Paul VI in his office on 29 June 1968

Of his seven encyclicals, Pope Paul VI is best known for his encyclical Humanae vitae (Of Human Life, subtitled On the Regulation of Birth), published on 25 July 1968, responding to the findings of the Pontifical Commission on Birth Control, affirming the minority report. The encyclical reaffirmed the Catholic Church's prior condemnation of artificial birth control. The expressed views of Paul VI reflected the teachings of his predecessors, especially Pius XI, Pius XII and John XXIII.

The encyclical teaches that marriage constitutes a union of the loving couple with a loving God, in which the two persons cooperate with God in the creation of a new person. For this reason, the encyclicals that the transmission of human life is a most serious role in which married people collaborate freely and responsibly with God. This divine partnership, according to Paul VI, does not allow for arbitrary human decisions, which may limit divine providence. The Pope does not paint an overly romantic picture of marriage: marital relations are a source of great joy, but also of difficulties and hardships. The question of human procreation exceeds in the view of Paul VI specific disciplines such as biology, psychology, demography or sociology. The reason for this, according to Paul VI, is that married love takes its origin from God, who "is love". From this basic dignity, he defines his position:

Love is total—that very special form of personal friendship in which husband and wife generously share everything, allowing no unreasonable exceptions and not thinking solely of their own convenience. Whoever really loves his partner loves not only for what he receives, but loves that partner for the partner's own sake, content to be able to enrich the other with the gift of himself.

The reaction to the continued prohibitions of artificial birth control was mixed. The encyclical was welcomed in Italy, Spain, Portugal, and Poland. In Latin America, much support developed for the Pope and his encyclical. As World Bank president Robert McNamara declared at the 1968 Annual Meeting of the International Monetary Fund and the World Bank Group that countries permitting birth control practices would get preferential access to resources, doctors in La Paz, Bolivia, called it insulting that money should be exchanged for the conscience of a Catholic nation. In Colombia, Cardinal Archbishop Aníbal Muñoz Duque declared, "If American conditionality undermines Papal teachings, we prefer not to receive one cent." The Senate of Bolivia passed a resolution stating that Humanae vitae could be discussed in its implications for individual consciences but was of greatest significance because the papal document defended the rights of developing nations to determine their own population policies. The Jesuit journal Sic dedicated one edition to the encyclical with supportive contributions.

Paul VI was concerned but not surprised by the adverse reaction in Western Europe and the United States. He fully anticipated this reaction to be a temporary one: "Don't be afraid," he reportedly told Edouard Gagnon on the eve of the encyclical, "in twenty years' time, they'll call me a prophet." His biography on the Vatican's website notes his reaffirmations of priestly celibacy and the traditional teaching on contraception that "[t]he controversies over these two pronouncements tended to overshadow the last years of his pontificate". Pope John Paul II later reaffirmed and expanded upon Humanae vitae with the encyclical Evangelium vitae.

=== Evangelism ===
By taking the name of Paul, the newly elected pope showed his intention to take Paul the Apostle as a model for his papal ministry. In 1967, when he reorganised the Roman Curia, Pope Paul renamed the Congregation for the Propagation of the Faith as the Congregation for the Evangelization of Peoples. Pope Paul was the first pope in history to make apostolic journeys to other continents. The Pope chose the theme of evangelism for the synod of bishops in 1974. From materials generated by that synod, he composed the 1975 apostolic exhortation on evangelisation, Evangelii nuntiandi.

=== Ecumenism and ecumenical relations ===
After the council, Paul VI contributed in two ways to the continued growth of ecumenical dialogue: The separated brothers and sisters, as he called them, could not contribute to the council as invited observers. After the council, many took the initiative to seek out their Catholic counterparts and the Pope in Rome, who welcomed such visits. However, the Catholic Church recognized from the many previous ecumenical encounters that much needed to be done within to be an open partner for ecumenism. To those entrusted with the highest and deepest truth, therefore, Paul VI believed that he had the most challenging part to communicate. Ecumenical dialogue, in the view of Paul VI, requires from a Catholic the whole person: one's entire reason, will, and heart. Paul VI, like Pius XII before him, was reluctant to give in on a lowest possible point. And yet, Paul felt compelled to admit his ardent Gospel-based desire to be everything to everybody and to help all people Being the successor of Peter, he felt the words of Christ, "Do you love me more" like a sharp knife penetrating to the marrow of his soul. These words meant to Paul VI love without limits, and they underscore the church's fundamental approach to ecumenism.

==== Oriental Orthodox and Eastern Orthodox Apostolic ====
Paul VI visited the Eastern Orthodox Apostolic Patriarchs of Jerusalem and Constantinople in 1964 and 1967. He was the first pope since the ninth century to visit the East, labelling the Eastern Churches as sister churches. He was also the first pope in centuries to meet the heads of various Eastern Orthodox communities. Notably, his meeting with Ecumenical Patriarch Athenagoras I in 1964 in Jerusalem led to rescinding the excommunications of the Great Schism, which took place in 1054.

This was a significant step towards restoring communion between Rome and Constantinople. It produced the Catholic-Eastern Orthodox Apostolic Joint Declaration of 1965, read on 7 December 1965, simultaneously at a public meeting of the Second Vatican Council in Rome and at a special ceremony in Istanbul. The declaration did not end the schism but showed a desire for greater reconciliation between the two churches. In May 1973, the Coptic Patriarch Shenouda III of Alexandria from the Coptic Orthodox Church visited the Vatican, where he met three times with Pope Paul VI. A common declaration and a joint creed issued after the visit proclaimed unity in a number of theological issues, but also that other theological differences "since the year 451" "cannot be ignored" while both traditions work to a greater unity.

==== Anglicans ====
Paul VI was the first pope to receive an Anglican Archbishop of Canterbury, Michael Ramsey, in official audience as Head of Church, after the private audience visit of Archbishop Geoffrey Fisher to Pope John XXIII on 2 December 1960. Ramsey met Paul three times during his visit and opened the Anglican Centre in Rome to increase their mutual knowledge. He praised Paul VI (Note: And John XXIII.) and his contributions in the service of unity. Paul replied, "By entering into our house, you are entering your own house; we are happy to open our door and heart to you." The two church leaders signed a joint declaration, ending past disputes and outlining a common future agenda.

Cardinal Augustin Bea, the head of the Secretariat for Promoting Christian Unity, added at the end of the visit, "Let us move forward in Christ. God wants it. Humanity is waiting for it." Unmoved by a harsh condemnation by the Congregation of Faith on mixed marriages precisely at this time of the visit, Paul VI and Ramsey appointed a preparatory commission which was to put the common agenda into practice on such issues as mixed marriages. This resulted in a joint Malta declaration, the first joint agreement on the Creed since the Reformation. Paul VI was a good friend of the Anglican Church, which he described as "our beloved sister Church." This description was unique to Paul and not used by later popes.

==== Protestants ====
In 1965, Paul VI decided to create a joint working group with the World Council of Churches to map all possible avenues of dialogue and cooperation. Eight sessions were held in the following three years, resulting in many joint proposals. It was proposed to work closely together in social justice and development and "Third World" issues such as hunger and poverty. On the religious side, it was agreed to be shared in the Week of Prayer for Christian Unity, which would be held annually. The joint working group was to prepare texts which were to be used by all Christians. On 19 July 1968, the meeting of the World Council of Churches took place in Uppsala, Sweden, which Pope Paul called a sign of the times. He sent his blessing ecumenically: "May the Lord bless everything you do for the case of Christian Unity." The World Council of Churches decided on including Catholic theologians in its committees, provided they have the backing of the Vatican.

The Lutherans were the first Protestant church offering a dialogue to the Catholic Church in September 1964 in Reykjavík, Iceland. It resulted in joint study groups of several issues. The dialogue with the Methodist Church began in October 1965, after its representatives officially applauded the past five years' remarkable changes, friendship, and cooperation. The Reformed Churches entered four years later into a dialogue with the Catholic Church. The President of the Lutheran World Federation and member of the central committee of the World Council of Churches Fredrik A. Schiotz stated during the 450th anniversary of the Reformation, that earlier commemorations were viewed almost as a triumph. He welcomed the announcement of Pope Paul VI to celebrate the 1900th anniversary of the death of the Apostle Peter and Apostle Paul, and promised participation and co-operation in the festivities.

Paul VI supported the new-found harmony and cooperation with Protestants on many levels. When Cardinal Augustin Bea went to see him for permission for a joint Catholic-Protestant translation of the Bible with Protestant Bible societies, the Pope walked towards him and exclaimed, "As far as the cooperation with Bible societies is concerned, I am totally in favour." He issued a formal approval on Pentecost 1967, the feast on which the Holy Spirit descended on the Christians, overcoming all linguistic difficulties, according to Christian tradition.

=== Beatifications and canonisations ===
Paul VI beatified 38 individuals in his pontificate and canonized 84 saints in 21 causes. Among the beatifications were Maximilian Kolbe (1971) and the Korean Martyrs (1968), Nikola Tavelić (1970) and the Ugandan Martyrs (1964).

In 1970, Paul VI also named the first female Doctors of the Church, Teresa of Ávila, which he called Doctor orationis ("Doctor of Prayer"), and Catherine of Siena.

=== Consistories ===
Pope Paul VI held six consistories between 1965 and 1977 that raised 143 men to the cardinalate in his fifteen years as pope:

- 22 February 1965, 27 cardinals
- 26 June 1967, 27 cardinals
- 28 April 1969, 34 cardinals
- 5 March 1973, 30 cardinals
- 24 May 1976, 20 cardinals
- 27 June 1977, 4 cardinals

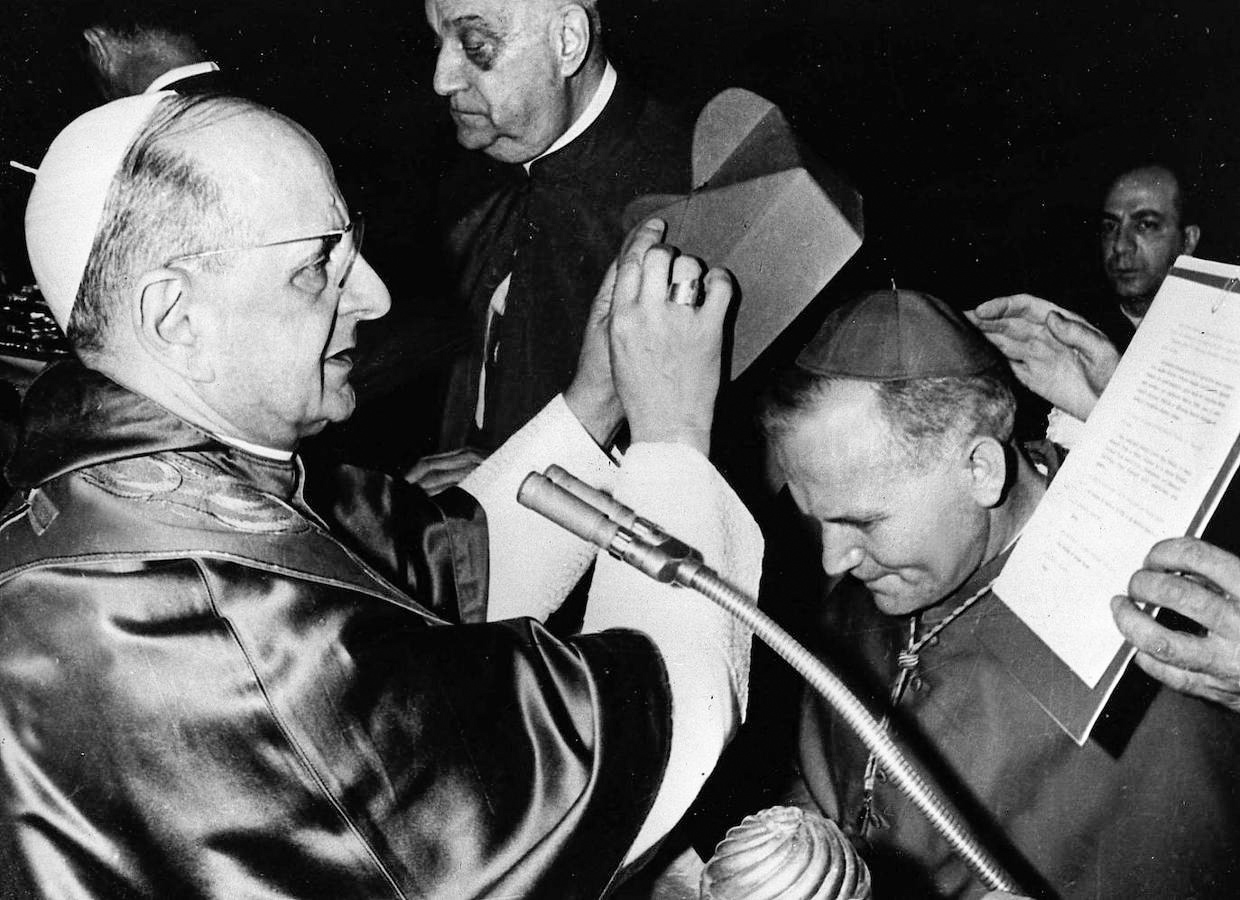
Paul VI making Karol Wojtyła (the future Pope John Paul II) a cardinal in 1967.

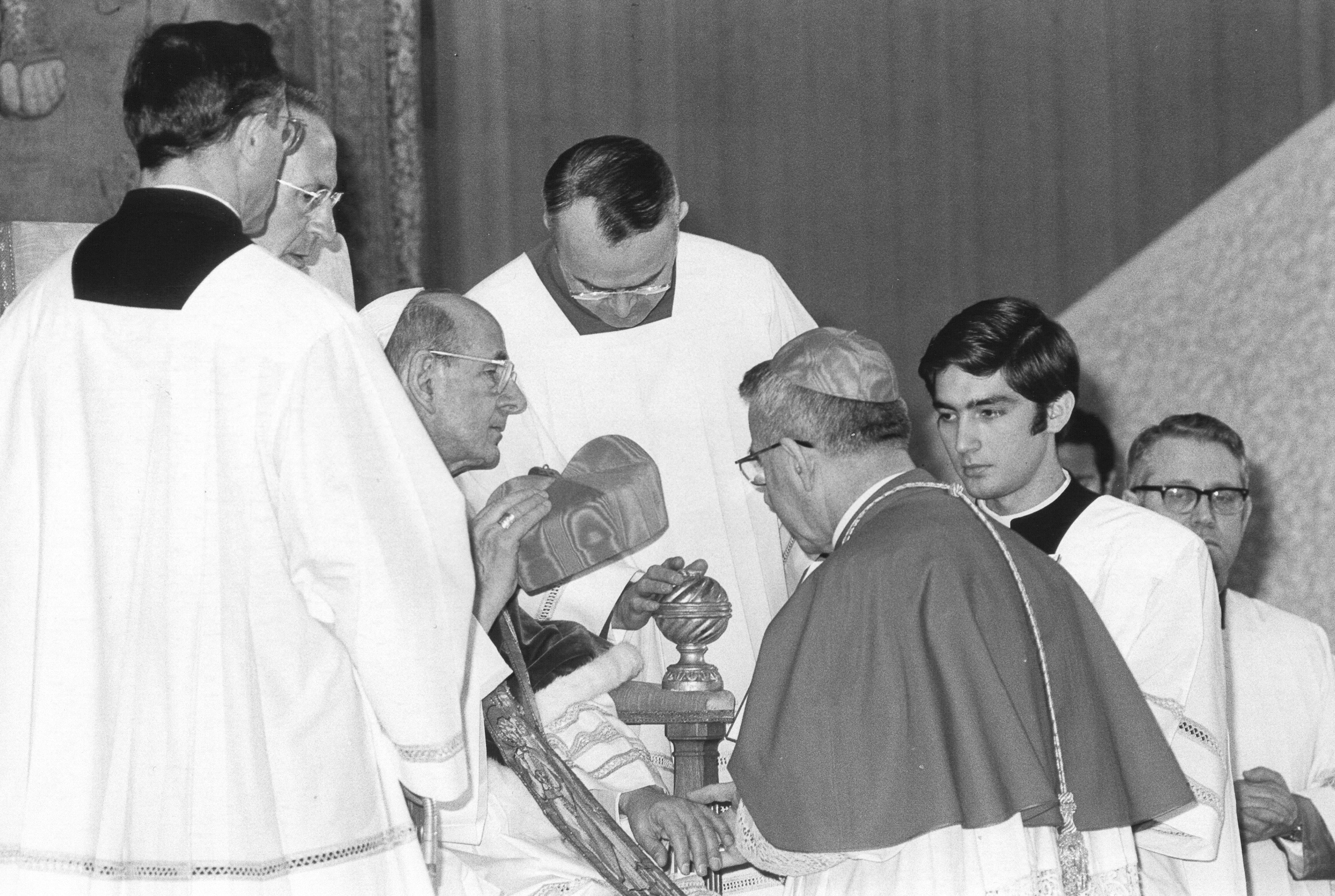
Paul VI making Albino Luciani (the future Pope John Paul I) a cardinal in 1973

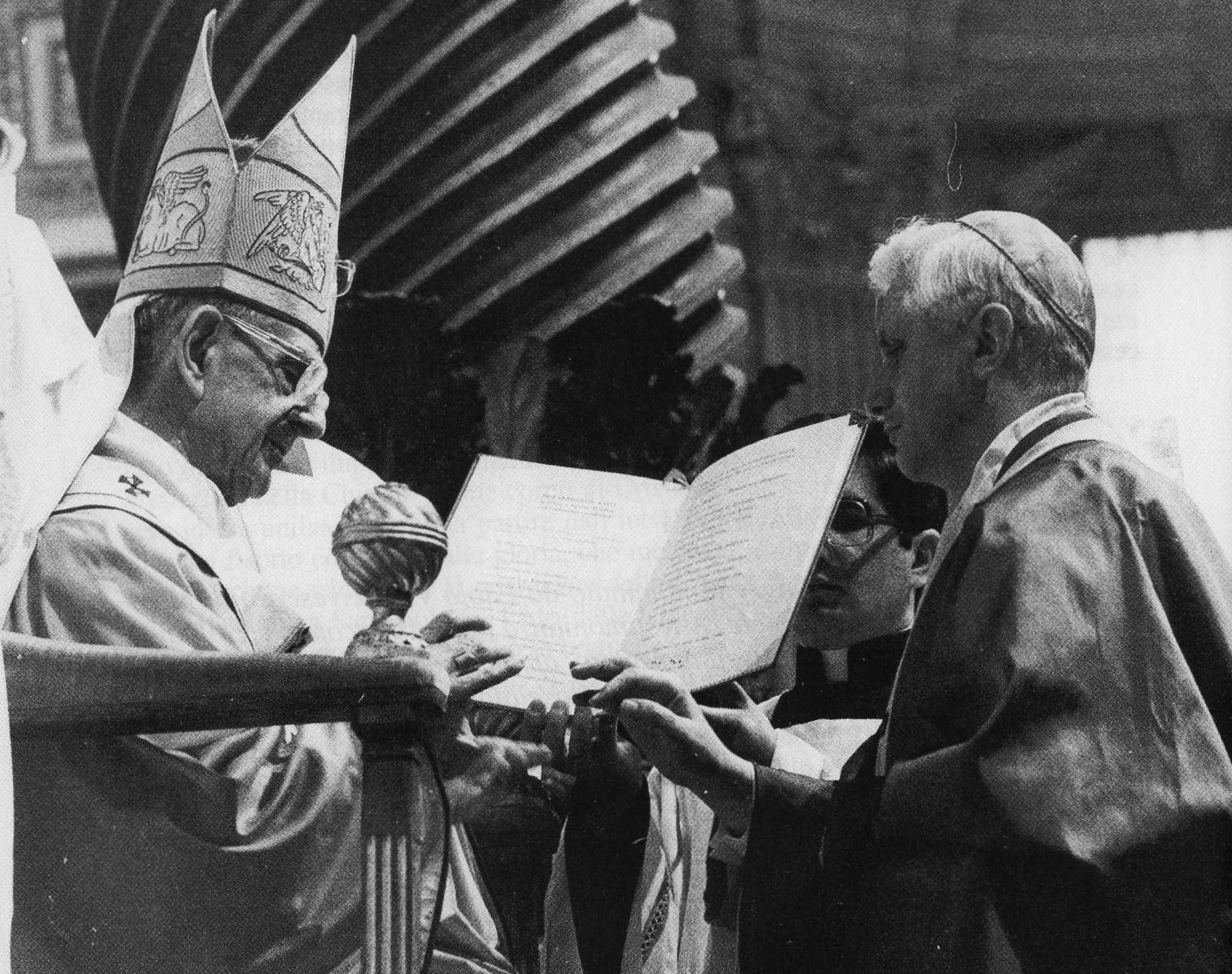
Paul VI making Joseph Ratzinger (the future Pope Benedict XVI) a cardinal in 1977

The successive three popes were created cardinals by him. His immediate successor, Albino Luciani, who took the name Pope John Paul I, was created a cardinal in the consistory of 5 March 1973. Karol Józef Wojtyła (later Pope John Paul II) was created a cardinal in the consistory of 26 June 1967. Joseph Ratzinger (later Pope Benedict XVI) was made a cardinal in the small four-appointment consistory of 27 June 1977 that was the Pope's last. Paul VI named Štěpán Trochta and Iuliu Hossu as cardinals "in pectore" in 1969 and only revealed Hossu's name in 1973 after Hossu died while formally naming Trochta. Similarly, Paul VI named both František Tomášek and Joseph-Marie Trịnh Như Khuê "in pectore" in 1976, only announcing the former in 1977 and the latter at the 1976 consistory itself, a month after having announced it and his hidden selection.

With the six consistories, Paul VI continued the internationalisation policies started by Pius XII in 1946 and continued by John XXIII. In his 1976 consistory, five of twenty cardinals originated from Africa, one of them a son of a tribal chief with fifty wives. Several prominent Latin Americans like Eduardo Francisco Pironio of Argentina; Luis Aponte Martinez of Puerto Rico, Eugênio de Araújo Sales and Aloisio Lorscheider from Brazil were also elevated by him. There were voices within the church at the time saying that the European period of the church was coming to a close, a view shared by Britain's Cardinal Basil Hume. At the same time, the members of the College of Cardinals lost some of their previous influences, after Paul VI decreed, that membership by bishops in committees and other bodies of the Roman Curia would not be limited to cardinals. The age limit of eighty years imposed by the Pope, a numerical increase of Cardinals by almost 100%, and a reform of the formal dress of the "Princes of the Church" further contributed to a service-oriented perception of Cardinals under his pontificate. The increased number of Cardinals from the Third World and the papal emphasis on related issues were nevertheless welcomed by many in Western Europe. The consistory of 1969 was the largest consistory since 1946 and would be surpassed later in 2001.

In 1965, the theologian Romano Guardini declined an invitation by Paul VI to be inducted into the College of Cardinals. In 1967, he also intended to nominate Pietro Sigismondi, but he died a month before the consistory was held. Also in 1967, according to the memoirs of Louis Bouyer, Paul VI intended to name Bouyer to the cardinalate after the Second Vatican Council; however, Paul VI was forced to abandon the idea after realizing that the French episcopacy would not warmly receive the appointment since Bouyer had been very critical of many of the positions taken by the French bishops. Other sources indicate that the Pope intended to name his friend Jacques Maritain to the cardinalate in 1969. Not only did Maritain decline, but if he had been elevated, it would have made him the first lay cardinal since 1858. On 22 February 1969, Paul VI and Monsignor Hieronymus Menges discussed nominating Iuliu Hossu and Áron Márton to the cardinalate (Pius XII dropped an idea to name Márton to the cardinalate in 1946), however, Márton's potential elevation was not considered acceptable, hence, Hossu was named in pectore since the Romanians would not have accepted Hossu either.

== Final years and death ==
=== Allegations of homosexuality ===
In 1976, Paul VI became the first pontiff in the modern era to deny the accusation of homosexuality. On 29 December 1975, the Sacred Congregation for the Doctrine of the Faith issued a document entitled Persona Humana: Declaration on Certain Questions concerning Sexual Ethics, that reaffirmed church teaching that premarital or extramarital sex, homosexual activity, and masturbation are sinful acts. In response, Roger Peyrefitte, who had already written in two of his books that Paul VI had a longtime homosexual relationship, repeated his charges in a magazine interview with a French gay magazine that, when reprinted in Italian, brought the rumours to a wider public and caused an uproar. He said that the Pope was a hypocrite who had a long-term sexual relationship with an actor. Widespread rumours identified the actor as Paolo Carlini, who had a small part in the Audrey Hepburn film Roman Holiday (1953). In a brief address to a crowd of approximately 20,000 in St Peter's Square on 18 April 1976, Paul VI called the charges "horrible and slanderous insinuations" and appealed for prayers on his behalf. Special prayers for the Pope were said in all Italian Catholic churches in "a day of consolation". (Note: In 1984, Paul Hofmann, a former correspondent for The New York Times, repeated the allegations.) The charges have resurfaced periodically. In 1994, Franco Bellegrandi, a former Vatican honour chamberlain and correspondent for the Vatican newspaper L'Osservatore Romano, alleged that Paul VI had been blackmailed and had promoted other gay men to positions of power within the Vatican. In 2006, the newspaper L'Espresso reported that the private papers of police commander General Giorgio Manes confirmed the blackmail story as true, and that Italian Prime Minister Aldo Moro had been asked to help.

=== Health ===
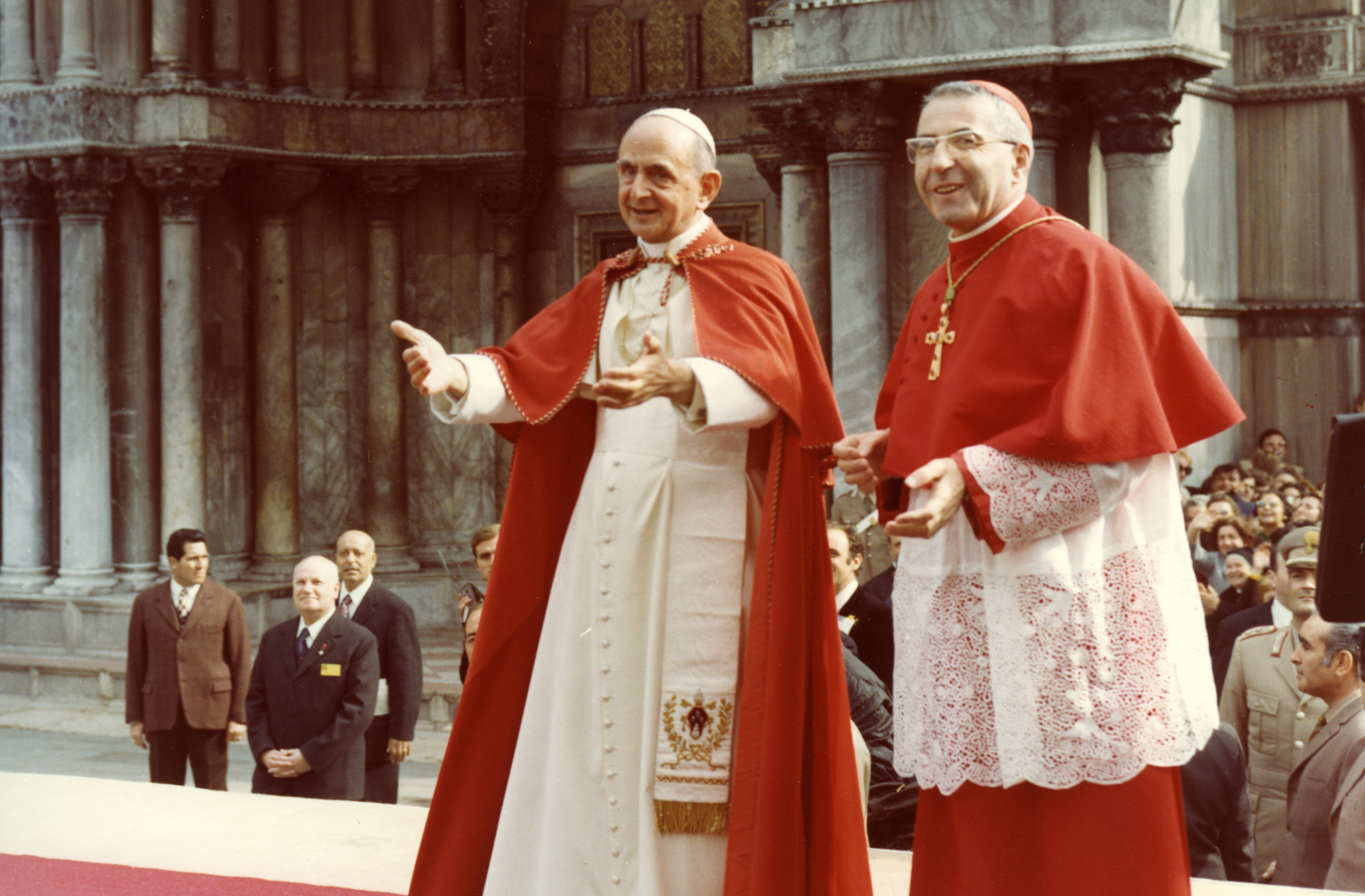
Paul VI with Albino Luciani (the future John Paul I) in Venice

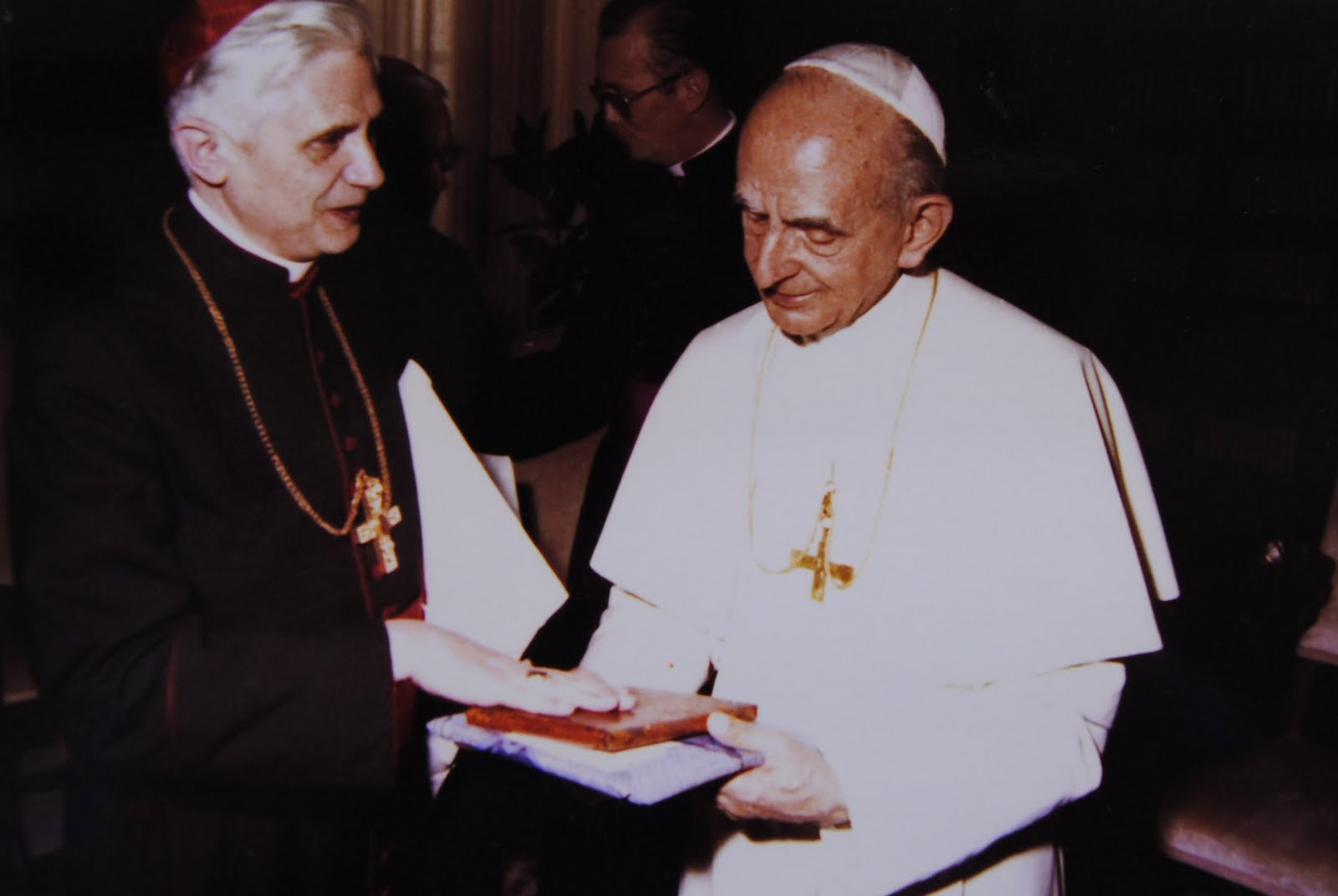
Paul VI with Joseph Ratzinger (the future Pope Benedict XVI) in 1977

Paul VI had been in good health prior to his pontifical election. His health following his papal election took a turn when he needed to undergo a serious operation to treat an enlarged prostate. The Pope procrastinated in this but relented in November 1967; the operation took place on a simple table in an improvised operating theatre in the papal apartments by a team led by Professor Pietro Valdoni. The Vatican was delicate in their description of what the Pope underwent and referred to it as "the malaise from which the Holy Father had been suffering for weeks". As a result of the delay in having the operation, the Pope had to wear a catheter for a period following the operation and still was by December.

The Pope discussed business from his bed about 48 hours after the operation with Cardinal Amleto Giovanni Cicognani and at that point was off intravenous feeding in favour of orange juice and hot broth. Cardinal Cicognani said the Pope was "in good general condition" and that he spoke in a "clear and firm voice". The Pope's two brothers also visited him at his bedside following a "tranquil night" for the Pope. The doctors also reported the Pope's condition to have been "excellent".

=== Kidnapping and killing of Aldo Moro ===
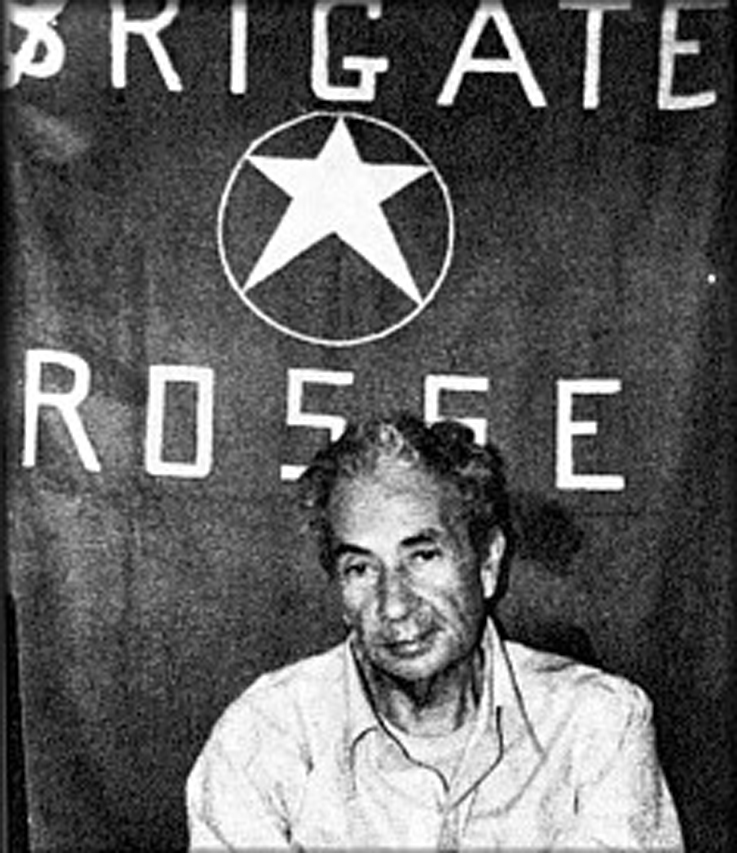
Aldo Moro, photographed during his kidnapping by the Red Brigades in 1978

On 16 March 1978, former Italian prime minister Aldo Moro—a friend of Paul VI's from his FUCI student days—was kidnapped by a far-left Italian terrorist group known as the Red Brigades. The kidnapping kept the country and the Pope in suspense for 55 days. On 20 April, Moro directly appealed to the Pope to intervene as Pope Pius XII had intervened in the case of Professor Giuliano Vassalli in the same situation. The eighty-year-old Paul VI wrote a letter to the Red Brigades:

I have no mandate to speak to you, and I am not bound by any private interests in his regard. But I love him as a member of the great human family as a friend of student days and by a very special title as a brother in faith and as a son of the Church of Christ. I make an appeal that you will certainly not ignore. On my knees I beg you, free Aldo Moro, simply without conditions, not so much because of my humble and well-meaning intercession, but because he shares with you the common dignity of a brother in humanity. Men of the Red Brigades, leave me, the interpreter of the voices of so many of our fellow citizens, the hope that in your heart feelings of humanity will triumph. In prayer and always loving you I await proof of that.

Some in the Italian government accused the Pope of treating the Red Brigades too kindly. Paul VI continued looking for ways to pay ransom for Moro, but his efforts were fruitless. On 9 May, the bullet-riddled body of Aldo Moro was found in a car in Rome. Pope Paul VI later celebrated his State Funeral Mass.

=== Final days ===
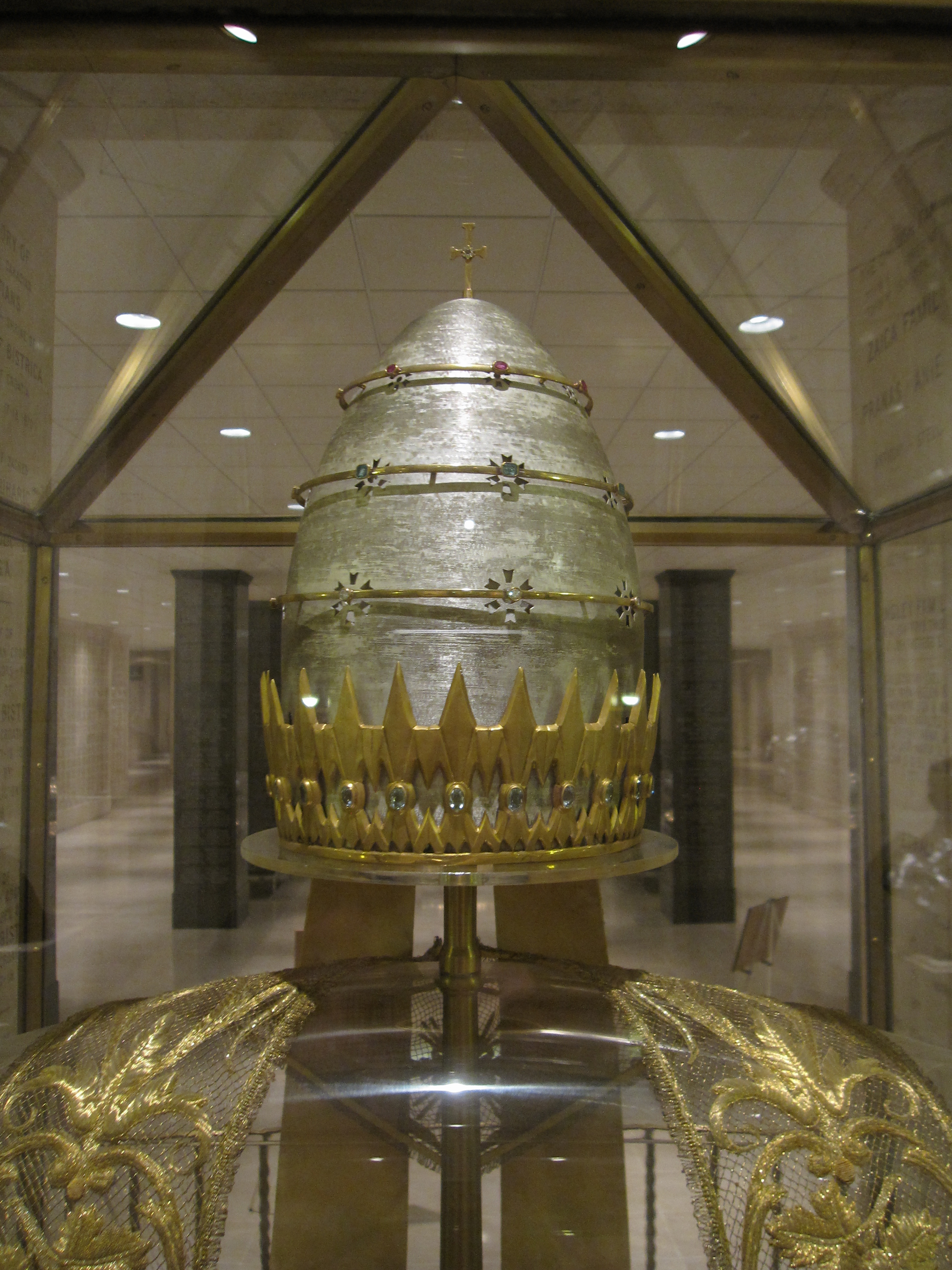
Paul VI's papal tiara, now in the Crypt of the Basilica of the National Shrine of the Immaculate Conception

Pope Paul VI left the Vatican to go to the papal summer residence, the Palace of Castel Gandolfo, on 14 July 1978, visiting on the way the tomb of Cardinal Giuseppe Pizzardo, who had introduced him to the Vatican half a century earlier. Although he was sick, he agreed to see the new Italian President Sandro Pertini for over two hours. In the evening he watched a Western on television, happy only when he saw "horses, the most beautiful animals that God had created." He had breathing problems and needed oxygen. On Sunday, 6 August, at the Feast of the Transfiguration, he was tired, but wanted to say the Angelus. He was neither able nor permitted to do so and instead stayed in bed, his temperature rising.

=== Death ===
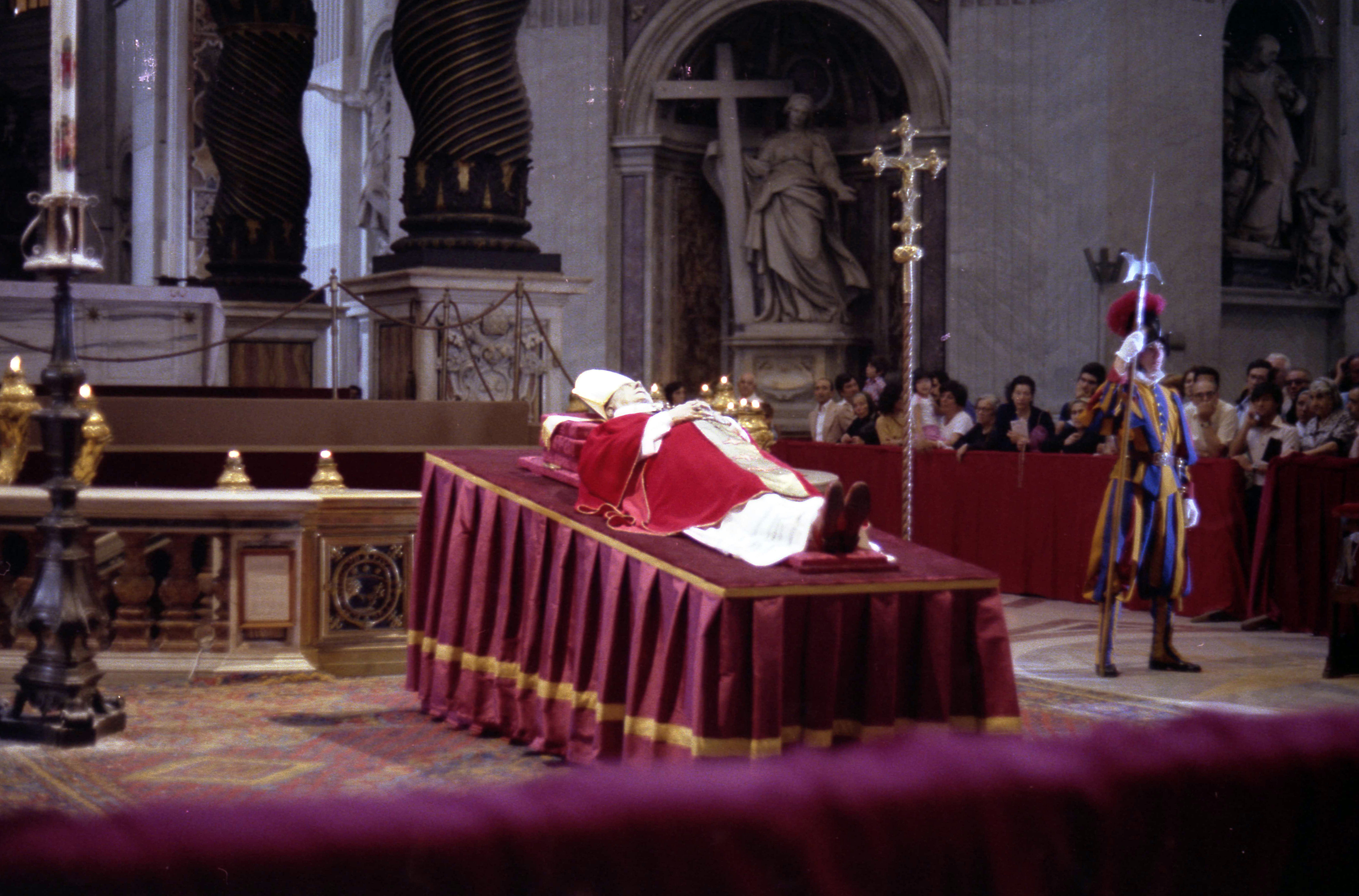
Paul VI's body in the Vatican after his death

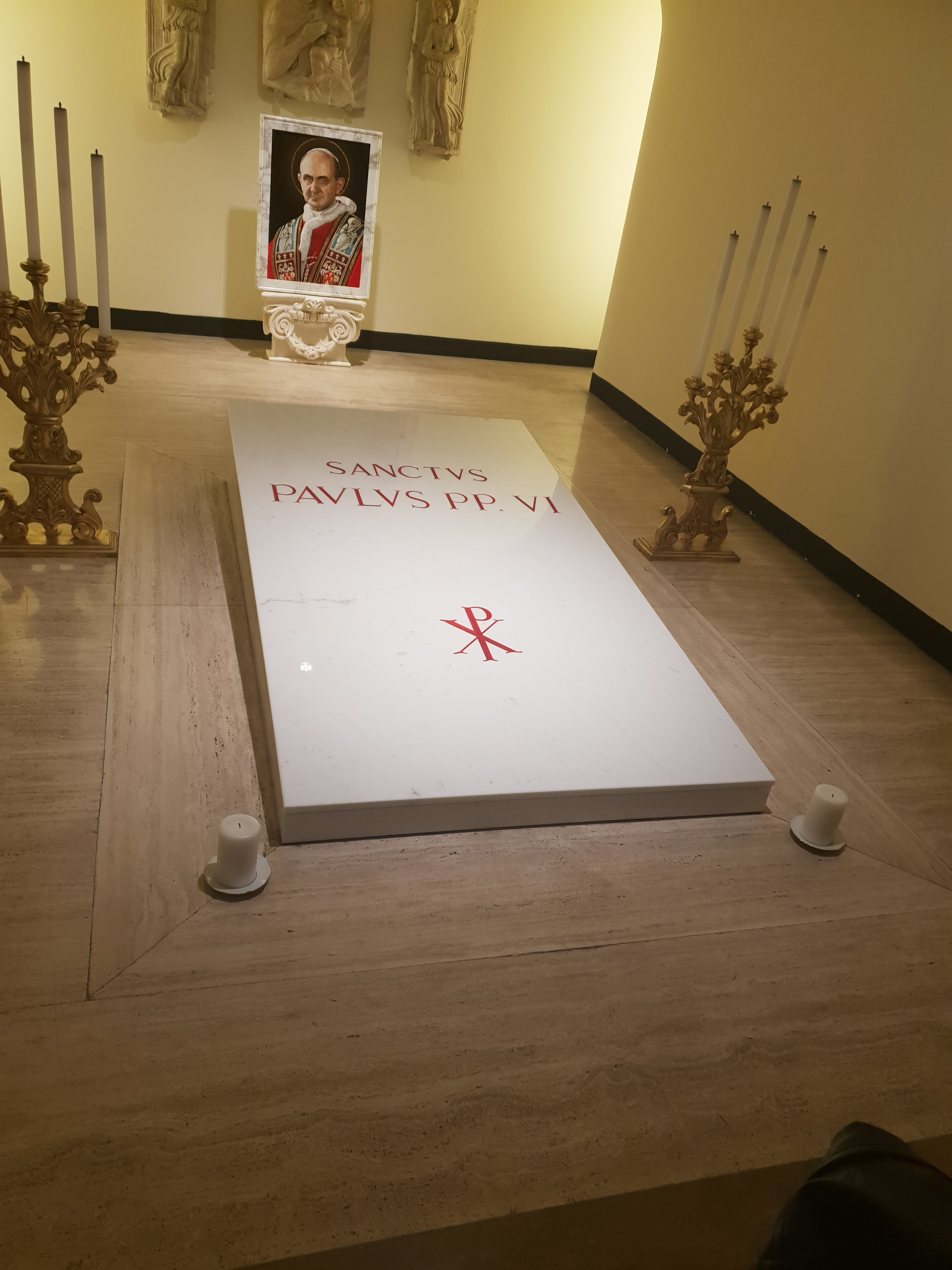
Tomb of Paul VI following his canonisation in October 2018

From his bed he participated in Sunday Mass at 18:00. After receiving communion, the Pope suffered a massive heart attack, after which he lived on for three more hours. On 6 August 1978 at 21:41, Paul VI died in Castel Gandolfo. Before he died, the pontiff had been lucid after the first heart attack. An hour before his death, he said he felt dizzy and asked those present to continue the prayers in his stead. Present at his bedside at the time of his death were Cardinal Jean-Marie Villot, Bishop Giuseppe Caprio, and his personal secretary Pasquale Macchi, as well as two nuns and his personal physician. By the time the Pope died, he was already confined to bed due to a flare up in his chronic joint arthritis and could not get up to personally celebrate the Mass. Upon the initial heart attack, the Pope was immediately given oxygen; however, the Holy See indicated that his heart condition was aggravated by a pulmonary edema, or the seeping of fluid into the lungs.

Syria declared nine days of mourning; Egypt declared seven days of mourning; Bolivia declared five days of mourning; Spain declared four days of mourning; Brazil, Italy Lebanon Portugal, Guatemala and Zaire declared three days of mourning; The Philippines declared one day of mourning.

Paul VI left a will and a spiritual testament. These were released by the Vatican shortly after his death. He asked for his burial to be simple, and that his correspondence, personal memos and other writings be destroyed. He also legated all his belongings to the Vatican.

Paul VI does not have an ornate sarcophagus, but is buried in a grave beneath the floor of Saint Peter's Basilica, in the Vatican Grottoes near the tombs of other popes.

His position mirrors the statements attributed to Pius XI: "a Pope may suffer but he must be able to function" and by Pius XII. Pope Paul, reflecting on Hamlet, wrote the following in a private note in 1978:

What is my state of mind? Am I Hamlet? Or Don Quixote? On the left? On the right? I do not think I have been properly understood. I am filled with 'great joy (Superabundo gaudio)' With all our affliction, I am overjoyed (2 Cor 2:4).

His confessor, the Jesuit Paolo Dezza, said that "this pope is a man of great joy", and that:

If Paul VI was not a saint, when he was elected Pope, he became one during his pontificate. I was able to witness not only with what energy and dedication he toiled for Christ and the Church but also and above all, how much he suffered for Christ and the Church. I always admired not only his deep inner resignation but also his constant abandonment to divine providence.

== Canonisation ==
Pope Saint Paul VI
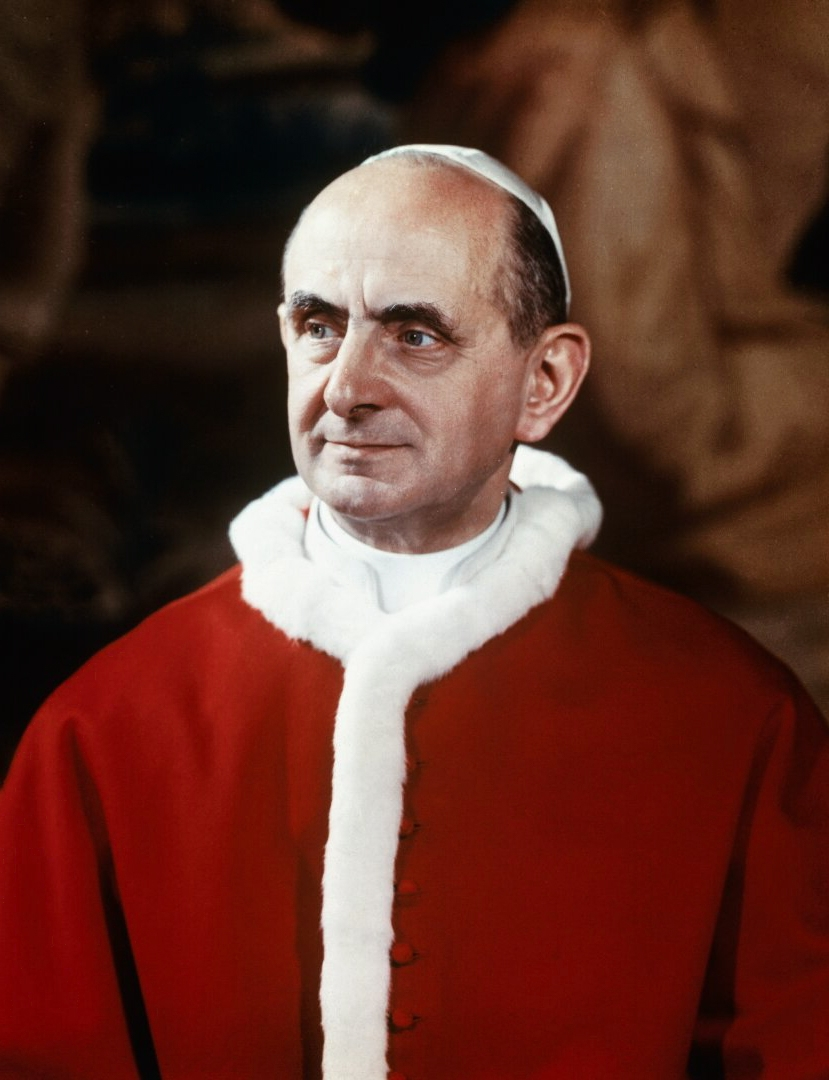

Pope Confessor of the Faith
- Born: Giovanni Battista Enrico Antonio Maria Montini
- Venerated in: Catholic Church
- Beatified: 19 October 2014, St. Peter's Square, Vatican City by Pope Francis
- Canonized: 14 October 2018, St. Peter's Square, Vatican City by Pope Francis
- Feast: 29 May
- Attributes: Papal vestments, Papal tiara, Pallium
- Patronage: Archdiocese of Milan, Paul VI Pontifical Institute, Second Vatican Council, Diocese of Brescia, Concesio, Magenta, Paderno Dugnano

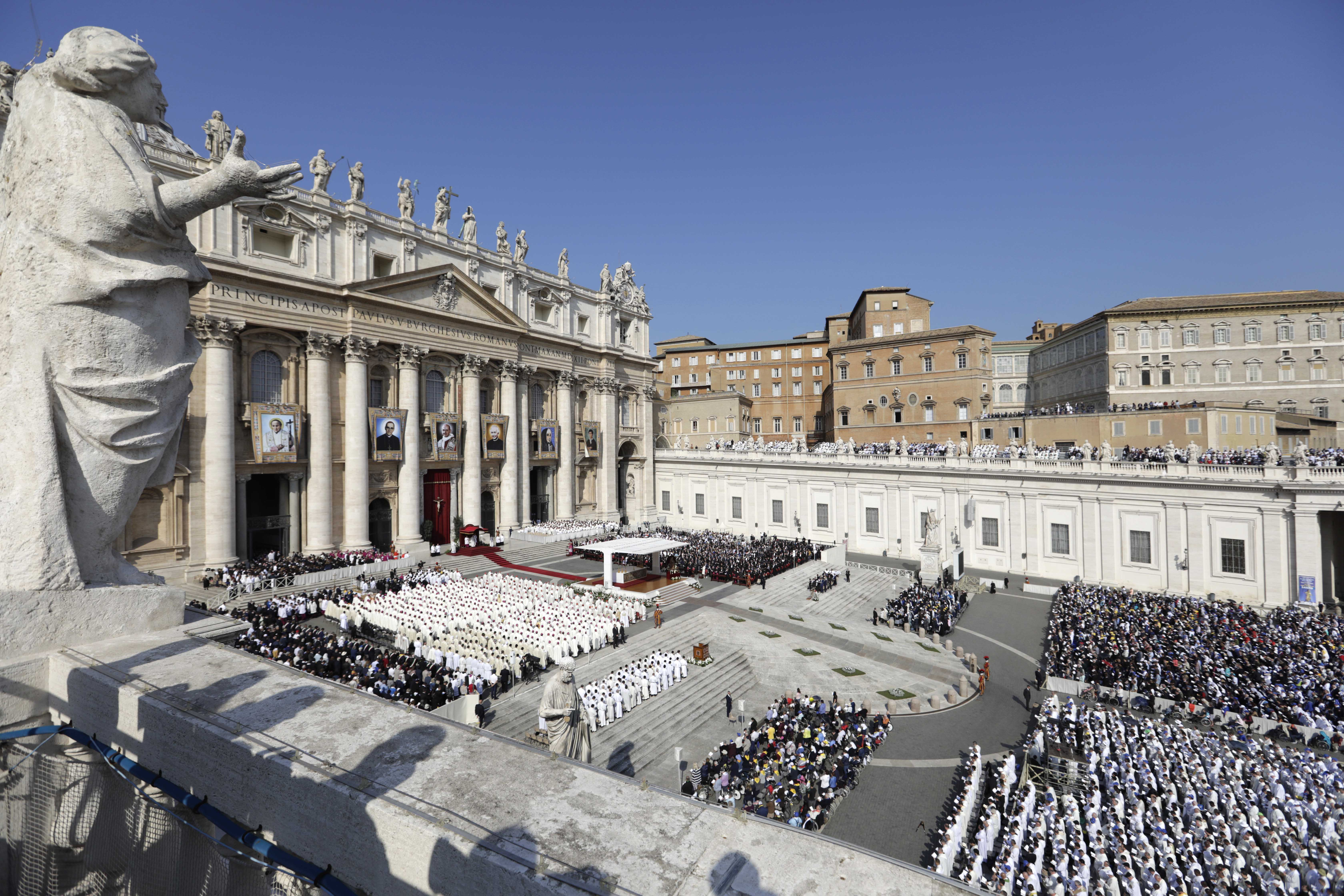
Canonization Mass held on 14 October 2018

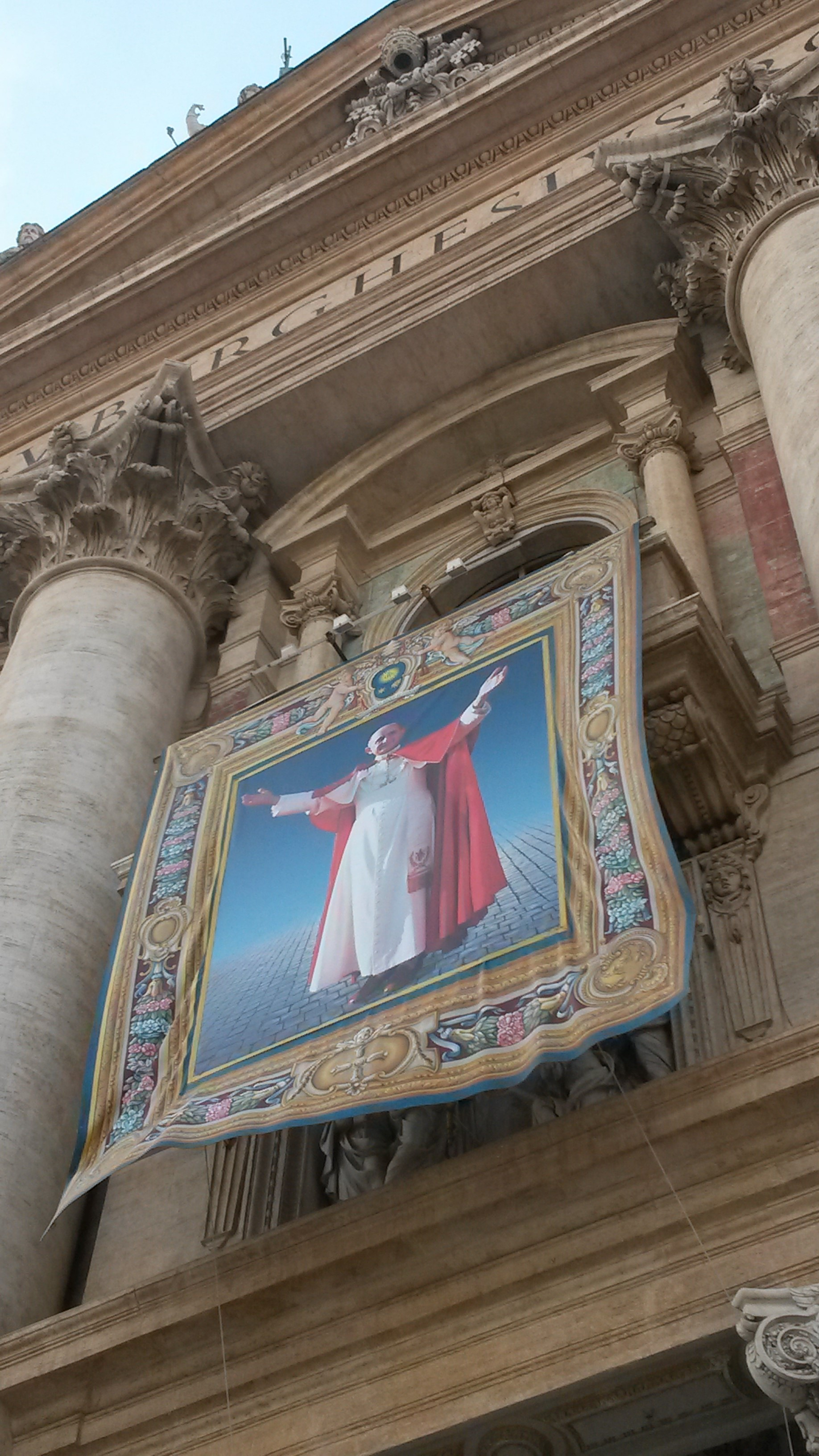
Tapestry of Paul VI on the occasion of his beatification on 19 October 2014

The diocesan process for beatification for Paul VI—titled then as a Servant of God—opened in Rome on 11 May 1993 under Pope John Paul II after the "nihil obstat" ("nothing against") was declared the previous 18 March. Cardinal Camillo Ruini opened the diocesan process in Rome. The title of Servant of God is the first of four steps toward possible canonisation. The diocesan process concluded its business on 18 March 1998.

On 20 December 2012, Pope Benedict XVI, in an audience with the Cardinal Prefect of the Congregation for the Causes of Saints Angelo Amato, declared that Paul had lived a life of heroic virtue, which means that he could be called "Venerable".

On 12 December 2013, Vatican officials comprising a medical panel approved a supposed miracle that was attributed to the intercession of Paul, which was the curing of an unborn child in California, U.S.A in the 1990s. This miracle was investigated in California from 7 July 2003 until 12 July 2004. It was expected that Pope Francis would approve the miracle in the near future, thus, warranting the beatification of Paul. In February 2014, it was reported that the consulting Vatican theologians to the Congregation for the Causes of Saints recognised the miracle attributed to Paul on 18 February.

On 24 April 2014, it was reported in the Italian magazine Credere that Paul could possibly be beatified on 19 October 2014. This report from the magazine further stated that several cardinals and bishops would meet on 5 May to confirm the miracle that had previously been approved, and then present it to Pope Francis who may sign the decree for beatification shortly after that. The Congregation for the Causes of Saints' cardinal and bishop members held that meeting and positively concluded that the healing was indeed a miracle that could be attributed to Paul. The matter would then be presented by the Cardinal Prefect to the Pope for approval.

The second miracle required for his canonisation was reported to have occurred in 2014 not long after his beatification. The vice-postulator, Antonio Lanzoni, suggested that the canonisation could be approved in the near future which would allow for the canonisation sometime in spring 2016; this did not materialise because the investigations were still ongoing at that stage. It was further reported in January 2017 that Pope Francis was considering canonising Paul VI either in that year, or in 2018 (marking 40 years since Paul VI's death), without the second miracle required for sainthood. This too was proven false since the miracle from 2014 was being presented to the competent Vatican officials for assessment.

Paul VI's liturgical feast day was then established to be celebrated on the date of his birth, 26 September, rather than the day of his death, as is usual since the latter falls on the Feast of the Transfiguration, a major feast in the liturgical year.

The final miracle needed for Paul VI's canonisation was investigated in Verona, the investigation being closed on 11 March 2017. The miracle in question involves the healing of an unborn girl, Amanda Maria Paola (born 25 December 2014), after her parents (Vanna and Alberto) went to the Church of Santa Maria delle Grazie, Brescia, to pray Paul's intercession the previous 29 October, just ten days after Paul VI was beatified. The miracle regarding Amanda was that she had survived for months despite a broken placenta. On 23 September, a month before the beatification, Amanda's mother Vanna Pironato (aged 35) was hospitalised due to the premature rupture of the placenta, with doctors declaring her pregnancy to be at great risk. The documents regarding the alleged miracle were by then in Rome awaiting approval, with his canonisation depending on the miracle's confirmation. Theologians advising the Congregation for the Causes of Saints voiced their approval to this miracle on 13 December 2017 (following the confirmation of doctors on 26 October) and had this sent to the cardinal and bishop members of the C.C.S. who had to vote on the cause also before taking it to Pope Francis for his approval. Brescian media reported the canonisation could take place in October 2018 to coincide with the synod on the youth. The cardinal and bishop members of the C.C.S. issued their unanimous approval to this miracle in their meeting held on 6 February 2018. Pope Francis confirmed that the canonisation would be approved and celebrated in 2018 in remarks made during a meeting with Roman priests on 14 February 2018. On 6 March 2018, the Cardinal Secretary of State Pietro Parolin, speaking at a plenary meeting of the International Catholic Migration Commission in Rome, confirmed that Paul VI would be canonised in at the close of the synod on 28 October 2018. On 6 March, the Pope confirmed the healing as a miracle, thereby approving Paul VI's canonisation; a consistory of cardinals on 19 May 2018 determined that the official date for Paul VI's canonisation, along with that of the assassinated Archbishop of San Salvador, Oscar Romero, would be 14 October 2018.

Paul VI's liturgical feast day, an optional memorial, had previously been celebrated on 26 September, the date of his birth, but was moved in 2019 to 29 May, the day of his priestly ordination.

== Legacy ==
Pope Paul VI continued the opening and internationalisation of the church that began under Pius XII and implemented the reforms of John XXIII and the Second Vatican Council. Yet, unlike these popes, Paul VI faced criticism throughout his papacy from both traditionalists and liberals for steering a middle course during Vatican II and during the implementation of its reforms thereafter. He expressed a desire for peace during the Vietnam War.

On basic Church teachings, the Pope was unwavering. On the tenth anniversary of Humanae vitae, he reconfirmed this teaching. In his style and methodology, he was a disciple of Pius XII, whom he deeply revered. He suffered for the attacks on Pius XII for his alleged silences during the Holocaust. Pope Paul VI was said to have been less intellectually gifted than his predecessors: he was not credited with an encyclopaedic memory, nor a gift for languages, nor the brilliant writing style of Pius XII, nor did he have the charisma and outpouring love, sense of humor and human warmth of John XXIII. He took on himself the unfinished reform work of these two popes, bringing them diligently with great humility and common sense and without much fanfare to conclusion. In doing so, Paul VI saw himself following in the footsteps of the Apostle Paul, who, being torn to several directions, said, "I am attracted to two sides at once, because the Cross always divides."

A statue of Paul VI in Milan, Italy

Paul VI received the Grand Cross First Class of the Order of Merit of the Federal Republic of Germany.

Paul VI refused to excommunicate opponents. He admonished but did not punish those with other views. The new theological freedoms which he fostered resulted in a pluralism of opinions and uncertainties among the faithful. New demands were voiced, which were taboo at the council: the reintegration of divorced Catholics, the sacramental character of the confession, and the role of women in the church and its ministries. Conservatives complained "women wanted to be priests, priests wanted to get married, bishops became regional popes and theologians claimed absolute teaching authority. Protestants claimed equality, homosexuals and the divorced called for full acceptance." Changes such as the reorientation of the liturgy, alterations to the ordinary of the Mass, alterations to the liturgical calendar in the motu proprio Mysterii Paschalis, and the relocation of the tabernacle were controversial among some Catholics.

While the total number of Catholics increased during the pontificate of Paul VI, the number of priests did not keep up. In the United States, at beginning of Paul's reign there were almost 1,600 priestly ordinations a year, while the number dropped to nearly 900 a year at his death. The number of seminarians at the same time dropped by three quarters. More pronounced declines were evident in religious life where the number of sisters and brothers declined sharply. Infant baptisms began to decline almost at once after Paul's election and did not begin to recover until 1980. In the same period adult conversions to the church declined by a third. While marriages increased annulments also increased but at a much greater rate. There was a 1,322% increase in declarations of nullity between 1968 and 1970 alone. While 65% of US Catholics went to Sunday Mass in 1965, that percentage had slipped to 40% by the time of Paul's death. Similar collapses occurred in other developed countries.

Paul VI renounced many traditional symbols of the papacy and the Catholic Church; some of his changes to the papal dress were temporarily reversed by Pope Benedict XVI in the early 21st century. Refusing a Vatican army of colourful military uniforms from past centuries, he got rid of them, leaving only the Swiss Guard in function. He became the first pope to visit five continents. Paul VI systematically continued and completed the efforts of his predecessors, to turn the Euro-centric church into a church of the world, by integrating the bishops from all continents in its government and in the Synods which he convened. His 6 August 1967 motu proprio Pro Comperto Sane opened the Roman Curia to the bishops of the world. Until then, only Cardinals could be leading members of the Curia.

Some critiqued Paul VI's decision; the newly created Synod of Bishops had an advisory role only and could not make decisions on their own, although the Council decided exactly that. During the pontificate of Paul VI, five such synods took place, and he is on record of implementing all their decisions. Related questions were raised about the new National Bishop Conferences, which became mandatory after Vatican II. Others questioned his Ostpolitik and contacts with Communism and the deals he engaged in for the faithful.

Paul VI suffered from the responses within the church to Humanae vitae. Most regions and bishops supported the pontiff, including notable support from Patrick O'Boyle. However, a small part of the church, especially in the Netherlands, Canada, and Germany openly disagreed with the Pope, which deeply wounded him for the rest of his life.

== See also ==
=== Directly related ===
- Paul VI Audience Hall
- Paul VI: The Pope in the Tempest

=== Associated topics ===
- Credo of the People of God
- Liberation theology
- List of meetings between the pope and the president of the United States
- List of popes

Catholic Church titles
Preceded by Federico Tedeschini	Substitute for General Affairs; 13 December 1937 – 17 February 1953	Succeeded by Angelo Dell'Acqua
Preceded by Alfredo Ildefonso Schuster	Archbishop of Milan; 1 November 1954 – 21 June 1963	Succeeded by Giovanni Colombo
Preceded by Alfredo Ildefonso Schuster	Cardinal-Priest of Santi Silvestro e Martino ai Monti; 18 December 1958 – 21 June 1963	Succeeded by Giovanni Colombo
Preceded by John XXIII	Pope; 21 June 1963 – 6 August 1978	Succeeded by John Paul I
