= Ingravescentem aetatem =

1970 motu proprio issued by Pope Paul VI

Ingravescentem aetatem Latin for 'The advanced age' Motu proprio of Pope Paul VI
- Signature date: 21 November 1970
- Subject: Retirement age for cardinals
- Text: In Latin

Ingravescentem aetatem (Ecclesiastical Latin: [iŋɡraveˈʃentem eˈtatem]) is a document issued by Pope Paul VI, dated 21 November 1970. It is divided into eight chapters. The Latin title is taken from the incipit, and translates to 'advancing age'. It established a rule that only cardinals who have not reached the age of 80 can participate in a conclave.

In 2013, when Pope Benedict XVI announced his retirement, he described his reasoning with the same phrase: ingravescente aetate.

== Contents ==
In this motu proprio, a document issued at his own initiative, Pope Paul modified the rules governing the participation by cardinals in a papal conclave to elect a new pope and he set age limitations for some of their other responsibilities. It was a part of a broader program to use age restrictions to change the demographic profile of church leadership that included the retirement of archbishops and bishops at age 75 as urged in Ecclesiae Sanctae (1966).

He established a rule that only cardinals who have not reached the age of 80 can participate in a conclave. The key dates were the cardinal's birthday and the opening day of the conclave, since the rule stated that at age 80 a cardinal loses the right to "enter the conclave". Also at 80, a cardinal's membership in the dicasteries of the Roman Curia and related institutions of the Holy See and Vatican City would now terminate.

Ingravescentem aetatem also asked the heads of Vatican departments to submit their resignations from those offices "voluntarily" at age 75 and noted that the pope would determine whether to accept those resignations on a case-by-case basis. (Note: Pope Francis modified this rule in 2014 to require such resignations.)

A cardinal's membership in the College of Cardinals was not otherwise affected. Ingravescentem aetatem specified they may participate in the several days of discussions that the cardinals hold before the start of a conclave. Other provisions established procedures to be followed to substitute a cardinal for one excluded by age from a conclave where he had duties to perform, as in the case of the dean of the College of Cardinals, or to fill certain key offices vacated due to age while the papacy is vacant, such as that of the camerlengo.

Pope Paul reiterated the rule restricting participation in conclaves by cardinals over 80 when he issued a general set of rules for conclaves, Romano Pontifici eligendo, in 1975.

== Impact ==
The immediate impact when the new rules took effect on 1 January 1971 was to eliminate the voting rights of 25 cardinals, 11 of them Italians, who were 80 years old on that day. It altered the cardinal electors as of that date from 127 with 38 Italians to 102 with 27 Italians.

Cardinal Alfredo Ottaviani, who had turned 80 just a month before the new rules were issued, said the Pope's action was "an act committed in contempt of tradition that is centuries old" and he was "throwing over board the bulk of his expert and gifted counselors". Cardinal Eugène Tisserant, 86, objected that each cardinal's health should determine his fitness and suggested that 73-year-old Paul VI seemed frail. Though seen as a way to reduce the influence of some of the most conservative cardinals, the new rule excluded as well Achille Liénart of Lille and Joseph Frings of Cologne, two of the leaders of the liberal wing of the Catholic church hierarchy at the Second Vatican Council. The New York Times reported that some observers thought Pope Paul was hinting that he would himself resign at 75. (Note: One historian believes that when the six cardinal bishops elected Amleto Cicognani as Dean of the College of Cardinals in 1972 at the age of 89, they "implicitly rebuked" Paul VI for establishing an age limitation for serving as a cardinal elector.) Pope Paul had in fact written a letter on 2 May 1965 in anticipation of inability to serve as pope until death. He wrote to the dean of the College of Cardinals that "In case of infirmity, which is believed to be incurable or is of long duration and which impedes us from sufficiently exercising the functions of our apostolic ministry; or in the case of another serious and prolonged impediment", he renounced his office "both as bishop of Rome as well as head of the same holy Catholic Church".

The first conclaves to which Pope Paul's rule applied were those of August and October 1978, where 15 cardinals were ineligible to enter the conclave because of their age. When the next conclave occurred in 2005, 66 cardinals were too old to participate. Cardinal Edward Cassidy, one of them, traveled from Australia to participate in pre-conclave discussions but defended the rule as an act of charity for allowing older members to absent themselves. He said that the sight of "people being carried up steps ... might make people wonder" about the suitability of the electors for their responsibility.

Pope John Paul II in Universi Dominici gregis of 22 February 1996 modified the rule slightly to avoid having the exclusion of a cardinal depend upon the start date of a conclave, a date which the cardinals can modify. Instead he excluded any cardinal who reaches 80 before the papacy becomes vacant through the death or resignation of a pope.

== Cardinals over the age of eighty ==
The following is a list of cardinals who were eighty or over eighty at the time the motu proprio came into effect.

=== Created by Pius XI ===
16 December 1929

- Manuel Gonçalves Cerejeira

30 June 1930

- Achille Liénart

15 June 1936

- Eugène Tisserant

=== Created by Pius XII ===
18 February 1946

- Carlos Carmelo Vasconcellos Motta
- Josef Frings
- Antonio Caggiano

12 January 1953

- Maurice Feltin
- James Francis McIntyre
- Benjamín de Arriba y Castro
- Alfredo Ottaviani

=== Created by John XXIII ===
15 December 1958

- Paolo Giobbe
- Amleto Giovanni Cicognani
- Fernando Cento
- José Garibi y Rivera
- Alberto di Jorio
- Francesco Roberti

14 December 1959

- Arcadio Larraona Saralegui
- William Heard

28 March 1960

- Antonio Bacci

13 March 1962

- José da Costa Nunes
- Efrem Forni
- Michael Browne

=== Created by Paul VI ===
22 February 1965

- Federico Callori di Vignale

26 June 1967

- Giuseppe Beltrami
- Carlo Grano
