= Francesco Roberti =

Italian cardinal (1889–1977)

His Eminence Francesco Roberti
- Prefect Emeritus of the Apostolic Signatura
- Church: Roman Catholic Church
- Appointed: 14 November 1959
- Term ended: 24 March 1969
- Predecessor: Giuseppe Bruno
- Successor: Dino Staffa
- Other post: Cardinal-Priest of Santi XII Apostoli (1967–77)
- Previous posts: Undersecretary of the Congregation for Seminaries and Universities (1931–36); Secretary of the Congregation of the Council (1946–58); Consultant of Justice of the Secretariat of State (1952–58); Cardinal-Deacon of Santa Maria in Cosmedin (1958–67); Titular Archbishop of Columnata (1962)

Orders
- Ordination: 3 August 1913
- Consecration: 19 April 1962 by Pope John XXIII
- Created cardinal: 15 December 1958 by Pope John XXIII
- Rank: Cardinal-deacon (1958–67); Cardinal-priest (1967–77)

Personal details
- Born: Francesco Roberti; 7 July 1889 Pergola, Pesaro, Kingdom of Italy
- Died: 16 July 1977 (aged 88) Rome, Italy
- Parents: Terenzio Roberti; Giuseppina Profili
- Education: Pontifical Roman Seminary; Pontifical Roman Athenaeum Saint Apollinare
- Motto: Meum robur Dominus
- Coat of arms

Styles of Francesco Roberti
- Reference style: His Eminence
- Spoken style: Your Eminence
- Informal style: Cardinal
- See: Ss. XII Apostoli (titular)

Francesco Roberti (7 July 1889 in Pergola – 16 July 1977) was an Italian cardinal of the Roman Catholic Church. He served as prefect of the Apostolic Signatura in the Roman Curia from 1959 to 1969, and was elevated to the cardinalate in 1958. He was also known for his work in moral theology.

== Biography ==
=== Early life and ordination ===
Roberti was born in Pergola to Terenzio and Giuseppina (née Profili) Roberti. He was baptised on the very day of his birth. After entering the minor seminary of Pesaro in 1899, he received the clerical tonsure on 26 December 1901. Roberti studied at the Pontifical Roman Seminary before being ordained to the priesthood on 3 August 1913.

=== Pastoral and academic work ===
From the Pontifical Roman Athenaeum S. Apollinare, he obtained his doctorates in philosophy, theology, and canon and civil law. After a period of pastoral work in Rome, Tor di Mezzavia d'Albano, and Torretta Massimi, Roberti was vice-rector of the Pontifical Minor Seminary in Rome from 1915 to 1916. He was raised to the rank of domestic prelate of his holiness on 2 March 1917, and taught canon law at his alma mater of the Pontifical Roman Athenaeum S. Apollinare from 1918 to 1938.

=== Roman Curia ===
Made an advocate of the Roman Rota and the Holy Office in 1927, Roberti became a referendary prelate of the Apostolic Signatura on 17 March 1928, and later a voting prelate of the same on 27 November 1930. On 24 April 1931, he was appointed undersecretary of the Sacred Congregation of Seminaries and Universities. Monsignor Roberti was made auditor of the Roman Rota on 5 June 1936, and served as dean of the Pontifical Institute of Canon and Civil Law from 1937 to 1943.

He was named secretary of the Sacred Congregation of the Council on 9 March 1946; as such, he was the second-highest official of that dicastery, successively under Cardinals Francesco Marmaggi, Giuseppe Bruno, and Pietro Ciriaci. In 1948, after a communist newspaper accused him of illegal financial manipulations, Roberti successfully sued for libel, sending the reporter to jail for twenty months. On 6 October 1952, Roberti also assumed the position of legal consultor to the Secretariat of State.

=== Cardinal ===
Pope John XXIII created him Cardinal-Deacon of Santa Maria in Cosmedin in the consistory of 15 December 1958, and then prefect of the Apostolic Signatura on 14 November 1959. As prefect, Roberti headed the Church's highest judicial authority below the pope himself. He was appointed Titular Archbishop of Columnata on 5 April 1962, and received his episcopal consecration on the following 19 April from Pope John, with Cardinals Giuseppe Pizzardo and Benedetto Aloisi Masella serving as co-consecrators, in the Lateran Basilica. He resigned as titular archbishop shortly afterwards, on 20 April of that same year. From 1962 to 1965 he attended the Second Vatican Council, during the course of which he was one of the cardinal electors who participated in the 1963 papal conclave that selected Pope Paul VI.

Pope Paul had Cardinal Roberti ask the prefects of the Roman congregations to suggest possible reforms within the Curia.

Before resigning as prefect of the Apostolic Signatura on 24 March 1969, Roberti exercised his right as a cardinal-deacon of ten years' standing to become a cardinal priest, receiving the titular church of Ss. XII Apostoli in the consistory of 26 June 1967.

=== Death ===
Cardinal Roberti died in Rome on 16 July 1977, at age 88. He is buried in his family's plot in Pergola.

Catholic Church titles
Preceded by Gaetano Cicognani	Prefect of the Supreme Tribunal of the Apostolic Signatura; 1959–1969	Succeeded by Dino Staffa
