= Pericle Felici =

Italian Catholic prelate (1911–1982)

His Eminence Pericle Felici
- Prefect of the Supreme Tribunal of the Apostolic Signatura
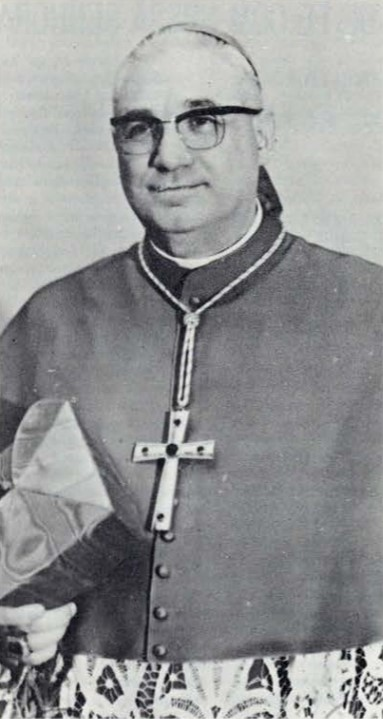
- Cardinal Felici in 1968
- Church: Roman Catholic Church
- Appointed: 15 August 1977
- Term ended: 22 March 1982
- Predecessor: Dino Staffa
- Successor: Aurelio Sabattani
- Other posts: President of the Pontifical Commission for the Interpretation of the Decrees of the Second Vatican Council (1967–82); President of the Pontifical Commission for the Revision of the Code of Canon Law (1967–82); Cardinal-Priest pro hac vice of Sant'Apollinare alle Terme Neroniane-Alessandrine (1979–82)
- Previous posts: Titular Archbishop of Samosata (1960–67); Secretary General of the Commission for the Coordination of Conciliar Work (1962–65); Cardinal-Deacon of Sant'Apollinare alle Terme Neroniane-Alessandrine (1967–79); Cardinal Protodeacon (1973–79)

Orders
- Ordination: 28 October 1933 by Alfonso Maria de Sanctis
- Consecration: 28 October 1960 by Pope John XXIII
- Created cardinal: 26 June 1967 by Pope Paul VI
- Rank: Cardinal-Priest

Personal details
- Born: Pericle Felici; 1 August 1911 Segni, Rome, Kingdom of Italy
- Died: 22 March 1982 (aged 70) Foggia, Italy
- Parents: Luigi Felici; Anna Roscioli
- Motto: Fructificat Domino
- Coat of arms: Pericle Felici's coat of arms

Styles of Pericle Felici
- Reference style: His Eminence
- Spoken style: Your Eminence
- Informal style: Cardinal
- See: Samosata (titular)

Pericle Felici (1 August 1911 – 22 March 1982) was an Italian prelate of the Catholic Church. From 1947 until his death he held various offices in the Roman Curia, including Secretary General of the Second Vatican Council, head of the Pontifical Commission for the Revision of the Code of Canon Law, and from 1977 Prefect of the Supreme Tribunal of the Apostolic Signatura. He became a cardinal in 1967. In 1978, he twice announced to the world from the balcony of St. Peter's Basilica the election of a new pope, John Paul I and John Paul II. At the Council he was identified with the conservatives who sought to maintain Curial control of the proceedings and he was a prominent voice for more conservative and traditionalist views throughout his career.

== Biography ==
Felici was born in Segni near Rome on 1 August 1911. He studied theology at the local seminary of Segni and at the Roman Pontifical Seminary. He was ordained as a priest in 1933. He earned degrees in philosophy, theology and canon law and then served for ten years as rector of the Pontifical Roman Seminary. He took up his first assignment with the Roman Curia in 1947 as an auditor of the Roman Rota, the Holy See's highest trial court.

=== Second Vatican Council ===
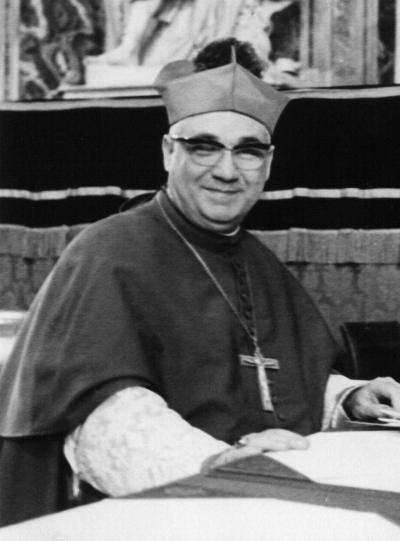
Monsignor Felici photographed during the Second Vatican Council

In 1959, when Pope John XXIII named a committee of twelve to plan the Second Vatican Council, Felici was named a member and its secretary. As secretary, he served as spokesman, outlining the committee's plans to the media. He described its work as current issues rather than questions of church practice and said journalists would be welcome to report freely: "The Pope wants all opinions, even if contrary to the doctrine, experience and jurisprudence of the Roman curia." Cardinal Roberto Tucci recorded in his diaries that Pope John described Felici as very learned and a hard worker, adding that "he has a narrow mind".

In 1960, he was appointed the titular archbishop of Samosata and ordained as a bishop on 28 October. Upon the death of Pope John in 1963, Felici led the services when the pope's body was transferred to St. Peter's Basilica and when it was interred in the basilica's crypt.

As Secretary General of the council, he took the required oath on behalf of all Council participants. He made announcements to the assembled bishops about their agenda and procedures in Latin, as well as the results of balloting when voting began in late 1963. In 1962, during its first session, he prevented the distribution of copies of a speech scheduled for delivery by Helder Pessoa Camara, then Auxiliary Bishop of Roman Catholic Archdiocese of Rio de Janeiro, because it criticized the council's failure to address social issues. On 25 November 1963, as the council's second session was nearing its end and factional disputes were breaking into the open, Felici tried to prevent the distribution of a statement on the council's much-contested document on communications signed by 25 bishops, even trying without success to take one from Auxiliary Bishop Josef Maria Reuss of Mainz and then summoning Vatican police. Thomas Merton mocked him as the council's "dean of discipline" when the next year Felici announced that distributing such leaflets was forbidden. Felici was identified as a key member of the Curia, along with such senior officials as Alfredo Ottaviani, head of the Congregation of the Holy Office, and Amleto Cicognani, Secretary of State, who tried to maintain control of the Council in the interests of the Roman Curia and limit the influence of the bishops who constituted the council's membership.

=== Later appointments ===
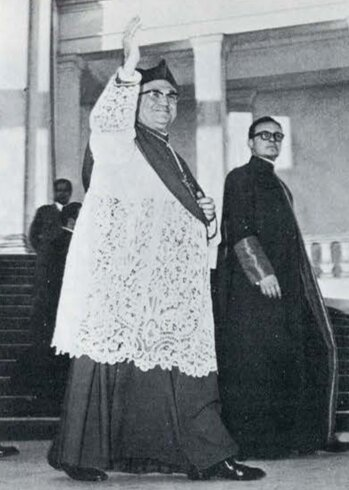
Cardinal Felici in Fátima in May 1968

He was also named president of the Pontifical Commission for the Interpretation of the Decrees of the Second Vatican Council. It was tasked with implementing papal decisions that resulted from the council's work and authoring decrees to implement the council's decisions on Christian education and on the role of the laity. He was also a member of the Vatican commission that reviewed the new catechism produced by the Dutch bishops in 1967 and sought clarifications before allowing it to be translated into other languages.

Beginning on 21 February 1967, he headed the Pontifical Commission for the Revision of the Code of Canon Law, (Note: Following Vatican practice for appointments to positions reserved for a cardinal, Felici was initially named pro-president of this Commission and became its president when he became a cardinal in June.) a task completed a few months before his death. The commission's initial attempts to produce an introductory statement on the nature of the Church, a text known as the Lex Fundamentalist, met significant criticism from those identified as liberals and progressives, and Cardinal Suenens blamed Felici personally for producing a text, he said, "completely blocking all future development". Felici circulated a draft to the world's bishops in the spring of 1971 and reported to the Synod of Bishops in November 1971 that it had been overwhelmingly rejected. It was, wrote one journalist, "vigorously and even bitterly criticized by canon lawyers and others" who described it as "overly authoritarian" and complained that it "committed the church to single outdated view of itself at a time when the subject is still a source of considerable disagreement among theologians".

By the time Pope Paul reiterated the Church's opposition to artificial birth control in Humanae vitae in 1968, Felici was recognized as one of the key figures in the Curia who supported Pope Paul VI in his "new hard-line policy". In The New Yorker, Francis X. Murphy found it "depressing" that the pope was "inspired and supported by the same group ... who tried unsuccessfully to thwart the majority of the bishops at the Council"–Ottaviani, Cicognani, Antoniutti, Staffa, and Felici–a group of whom the liberal and controversial theologian Edward Schillebeeckx said: "In my opinion, Pope Paul has become a prisoner of five or six cardinals. Because of their one-sided information, he became convinced of the necessity of a hard line [on birth control]. Everybody knows who these cardinals are. They are really blind. They are the ones who are destroying the Church." (Note: The New Yorker article appeared under the byline of Xavier Rynne, the pseudonym of Francis X. Murphy.)

Felici appeared in a more collaborative context in 1970 when he joined Cardinal Johannes Willebrands in announcing somewhat relaxed rules for Catholics who marry non-Catholics.

He was also a member of the Pontifical Commission for the Revision of the Code of Canon Law for the Eastern Rite.

On 26 June 1967, Pope Paul VI elevated him to the rank of cardinal and made Cardinal-Deacon of Sant'Apollinare alle Terme Neroniane-Alessandrine. At a reception for the new cardinals, Pope Paul asked him what the appointment meant to him and he answered: "A lot of work and loyalty to the boss."

On 14 September 1977, he was appointed Prefect of the Supreme Tribunal of the Apostolic Signatura, the chief judicial officer of the Holy See.

=== 1978 conclaves ===
In 1978, Felici participated in the August and October papal conclaves, where he was considered papabile, that is, a candidate for election, though no candidate appeared particularly strong. Reports said U.S. and Latin American cardinals found Felici too conservative.

Because he was the senior Cardinal Deacon, he made the first public announcement of the conclave's results, announcing the elections of Albino Luciani as Pope John Paul I and of Karol Wojtyła as Pope John Paul II. He also as senior cardinal deacon bestowed the pallium on both popes at their papal inaugurations.

His title as cardinal-deacon was changed to cardinal-priest on 30 June 1979.

=== Synod of Bishops ===
He was a conservative voice at several meetings of the Synod of Bishops. In 1971, though Pope Paul had sought the bishops' opinions on priestly celibacy, he preferred to leave the matter to the pope alone. In 1974, he led the discussion group that chose Latin as its common language and he criticized liberals who represented social and political liberation as a pathway to liberation from sin, which he considered a formulation that reversed the truth and disparaged the role of religion and the Church.

In 1978, Pope John Paul II appointed Felici to the 15-member council of the Secretariat for the Synod of Bishops, in likely anticipation of the planned 1980 synod on the family, given the Signatura's responsibility for marriage annulments. Felici was known as an opponent of proposals to ease the granting of annulments. At that Synod in October 1980, when several bishops called for a study of the Church's ban on artificial forms of birth control or a reconsideration of the way the Church taught it, he said he considered the encyclical that established the ban, Humanae vitae, a "closed" document. (Note: Those criticizing the ban included Cardinal Basil Hume of Westminster, Archbishop John R. Quinn of San Francisco, president of the United States Conference of Catholic Bishops, and Archbishop Joseph Bernadin of Cincinnati, its former president.) Felici said: "There is no need of rediscussing it, no need to pay attention to statistics because statistics don't signify anything." In a speech approved by Pope John Paul II, he reported to the Synod that marriage annulments were rapidly increasing and that lower courts were failing to uphold standards and using excuses like "psychological immaturity". He warned that canon law should not be disregarded out of "theological or pastoral concern". (Note: According to the New York Times, annulments granted in the United States rose from 338 in 1968 to 17,190 in 1978.)

=== Last years ===
A master of Latin, he "had a biting sense of humor, which he reportedly used at the expense of cardinals whose Latin was not up to his". He wrote poetry in Latin and was said to prefer to converse in Latin.

He suffered a heart attack in 1980. He collapsed after attending a religious service in Foggia and died there on 22 March 1982. At the time of his death, he was a member of several dicasteries, including the Congregation for the Doctrine of the Faith, the Congregation for Bishops, the Sacred Congregation for the Discipline of the Sacraments, and the Congregation for the Causes of Saints.

His diaries of his work for the Second Vatican Council covering the years 1959 to 1966 were published in 2015.

== Selected works ==
- Council Digest: The Basic Message of Vatican Council II (1981)
- Concilio vitam alere: Meditationes super decretis Concilii Vaticani II (1975), with Trento Longaretti
- Il diario conciliare di monsignor Pericle Felici (2015), edited by Vincenzo Carbone and Agostino Marchetto
- Magistero e Autorità nella Chiesa (1969)

== Notes ==
Catholic Church titles
Preceded by Charles Journet	Cardinal Protodeacon; 5 March 1973 – 30 June 1979	Succeeded by Sergio Pignedoli
Preceded by Dino Staffa	Prefect of the Supreme Tribunal of the Apostolic Signatura; 13 September 1977 – 22 March 1982	Succeeded by Aurelio Sabattani
