= Arcadio Larraona Saralegui =

Spanish Catholic cardinal (1887–1973)

His Eminence Arcadio Larraona Saralegui C.M.F.
- Prefect Emeritus of the Congregation of Rites
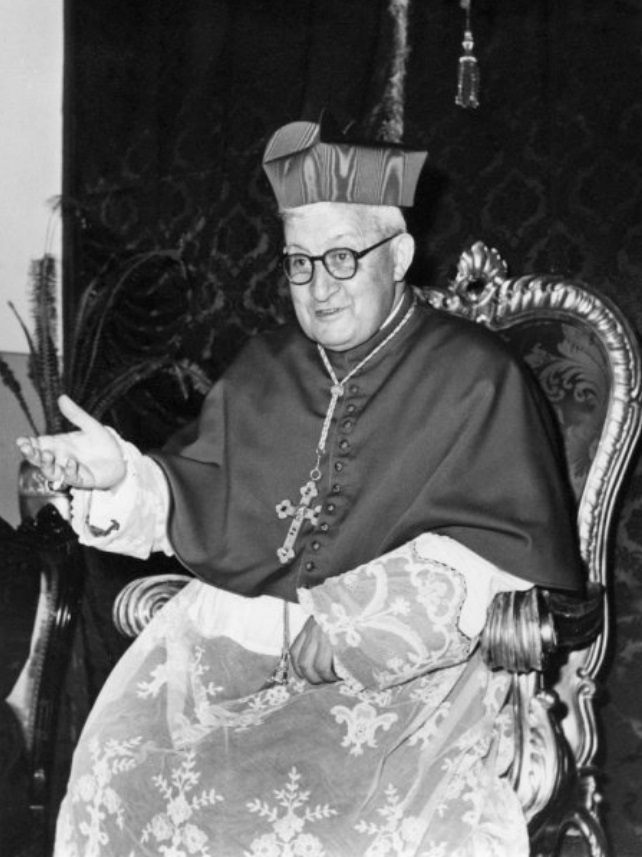
- Larraona circa 1959
- Church: Roman Catholic Church
- Appointed: 12 February 1962
- Term ended: 9 January 1968
- Predecessor: Gaetano Cicognani
- Successor: Benno Walter Gut
- Other posts: Cardinal-Priest of Sacro Cuore di Maria (1969–73); Superior General of Saint John the Baptist Precursor (1959–73)
- Previous posts: Papal Commissioner of the Society of Saint Paul (1940–1945); Undersecretary of the Congregation of Religious (1943–50); Secretary of the Congregation of Religious (1950–59); Cardinal-Deacon of Santi Biagio e Carlo ai Catinari (1959–69); Major Penitentiary of the Apostolic Penitentiary (1961–62); Titular Archbishop of Diocaesarea in Isauria (1962); Cardinal Protodeacon (1967–69)

Orders
- Ordination: 10 June 1911 by Juan Soldevila Romero
- Consecration: 19 April 1962 by Pope John XXIII
- Created cardinal: 14 December 1959 by Pope John XXIII
- Rank: Cardinal-Deacon (1959–69); Cardinal-Priest (1969–73)

Personal details
- Born: Arcadio María Larraona Saralegui; 13 November 1887 Oteiza de la Solana, Navarra, Kingdom of Spain
- Died: 7 May 1973 (aged 85) Rome, Italy
- Buried: Sacro Cuore di Maria
- Parents: Patricio Larraona; Bartolina Saralegui
- Education: Pontifical Roman Athenaeum S. Apollinare; Sapienza University of Rome; Pontifical Gregorian University
- Motto: Dilexit tradidit

Styles of Arcadio Larraona Saralegui
- Reference style: His Eminence
- Spoken style: Your Eminence
- Informal style: Cardinal
- See: none

Arcadio María Larraona Saralegui, C.M.F. (13 November 1887 – 7 May 1973) was a Spanish cardinal of the Catholic Church. He served as prefect of the Sacred Congregation of Rites from 1962 to 1968, and was elevated to the cardinalate in 1959.

== Biography ==
Larraona Saralegui was born in Oteiza de la Solana, Navarra, to Patricio Larraona and his wife Bartolina Saralegui. He was the second of five children, his siblings being named Luis, Digna, Amparito (who died in infancy), and Amparo. Entering the Congregation of the Missionary Sons of the Immaculate Heart of Mary in 1899, Larraona Saralegui received his habit on 28 July 1902, and professed his final vows on 8 December 1903. After attending the University of Lleida, he was ordained to the priesthood by Archbishop Juan Soldevila y Romero on 10 June 1911. Larraona Saralegui left for Rome on the following 24 October to study at the Pontifical Roman Athenaeum S. Apollinare (from where he obtained his doctorate in canon and civil law) and the University of Rome.

At his alma mater of the Pontifical Roman Athenaeum S. Apoillinare, he was made professor of institutions and history of civil law in 1919, and later served as professor of Roman law for forty years. Within the Claretians, he held the posts of counselor of the Italian province, visitor to Germany, and general assistant to Italy, Central Europe, and China. He was appointed consultor, in the Roman Curia, of the Sacred Congregation of the Oriental Churches on 8 October 1929, and of the Sacred Congregation of Religious on 3 December of that same year.

He was made undersecretary (27 November 1943) and later secretary (11 December 1949) of the Congregation of Religious. Before naming him as major penitentiary on 13 August 1961, Pope John XXIII created him cardinal-deacon of Ss. Biagio e Carlo ai Catinari in the consistory of 14 December 1959. He thus became the first Claretian member of the College of Cardinals; he required the permission of his order to change his brown habit for scarlet robes, provided they were made of wool. On 12 February 1962, Cardinal Larraona Saralegui was advanced to prefect of the Sacred Congregation of Rites and, in preparation of the Second Vatican Council, president of the Pontifical Commission of the Sacred Liturgy.

Cardinal Larraona Saralegui was appointed Titular Archbishop of Diocaesarea in Isauria on 5 April 1962, and received his episcopal consecration on the following 19 April from Pope John, with Cardinals Giuseppe Pizzardo and Benedetto Aloisi Masella serving as co-consecrators, in the Lateran Basilica. He resigned as titular archbishop, on 20 April of that same year. Attending all four sessions of the Second Vatican Council, he served as a cardinal elector in the 1963 papal conclave that selected Pope Paul VI. During the conclave, he voiced Franco's opposition to the future Paul VI. His message was carefully drafted to fall outside the prohibition of the Jus exclusivae by Pius X, but the cardinals nevertheless thought it outrageous. (Note: Just after the conclave ended, The New York Times reported: "A report before the beginning of the conclave that Generalissimo Francisco Franco had asked the six Spanish cardinals to prevent Cardinal Montini's elevation was emphatically denied. The Spanish press had criticized [Montini] last October after he had publicly interceded with [Franco] for political prisoners.") Larraona Saralegui, who had acquired the reputation of being sternly conservative, was cardinal protodeacon, or the most senior cardinal-deacon, from 26 June 1967 to 28 April 1969. He resigned as prefect of rites on 9 January 1968, and later exercised his right as a cardinal-deacon of ten years' standing to become a cardinal-priest (receiving the title of S. Cuore di Maria in the consistory of 28 April 1969).

Cardinal Larraona Saralegui died on 7 May 1973 at 10:10 am after a six-day broncho pulmonary infection in the Roman headquarters of the Claretians, at age 85. He is buried in the chapel of S. Giuseppe in the basilica of Sacro Cuore di Maria, according to his will.

== Trivia ==
- He participated in the preparation of the 1917 Code of Canon Law.
- While a priest, he also taught at the Pontifical Urbaniana University and the "Scuola Pratica" of the Sacred Congregation of Religious.
- Larraona Saralegui prepared the particular law of his congregation at its general chapter in 1922.
- He collaborated in the preparation of the apostolic constitutions "Provida Mater Ecclesia" of 2 February 1947; "Sponsa Christi" of 21 November 1950; and "Sedes Sapientiæ of 31 May 1956.
- Before dying he received a papal blessing.
- During his body's exposition in the chapel of Collegio Claretianum on Via Aurelia, visitors included the Pope, numerous cardinals and Curial officials, diplomats to the Holy See, and many Spanish priests and religious.
- A street in Pamplona, the capital city of Navarre, is named after him.

== Notes ==
Catholic Church titles
Preceded by Nicola Canali	Major Penitentiary; 1961–1962	Succeeded by Fernando Cento
Preceded by Gaetano Cicognani	Prefect of the Sacred Congregation of Rites; 1962–1968	Succeeded by Benno Gut, OSB
Preceded by Alfredo Ottaviani	Cardinal Protodeacon; 1967–1969	Succeeded by William Theodore Heard
