= Zerba (surname) =

Zerba is a surname. Notable people with the surname include:

- Cesare Zerba (1892–1973), Italian cardinal
- Nicolás Zerba (born 1999), Argentine professional volleyball player

== See also ==
- Zerba, a comune in the Province of Piacenza, Emilia-Romagna, Italy.
