= Giacomo Violardo =

Italian cardinal

His Eminence Giacomo Violardo
- Patron of the Sovereign Military Order of Malta
- Church: Roman Catholic Church
- Appointed: 3 July 1969
- Term ended: 17 March 1978
- Predecessor: Paolo Giobbe
- Successor: Paul-Pierre Philippe
- Other post: Cardinal-Deacon of Sant'Eustachio (1969-78)
- Previous posts: Promoter of Justice of the Apostolic Signatura (1938-54); Undersecretary of the Apostolic Signatura (1954-65); Secretary of the Pontifical Commission for the Revision of the Code of Canon Law (1962-65); Secretary of the Congregation for Sacramental Discipline (1965-69); Titular Archbishop of Satafi (1966-69)

Orders
- Ordination: 29 June 1923
- Consecration: 19 March 1966 by Pope Paul VI
- Created cardinal: 28 April 1969 by Pope Paul VI
- Rank: Cardinal-deacon

Personal details
- Born: Giacomo Violardo; 10 May 1898 Govone, Kingdom of Italy
- Died: 17 March 1978 (aged 79) Vatican City
- Education: Pontifical Roman Athenaeum S. Apollinare; Università Cattolica del Sacro Cuore

Styles of Giacomo Violardo
- Reference style: His Eminence
- Spoken style: Your Eminence
- Informal style: Cardinal
- See: none

Giacomo Violardo (10 May 1898 – 17 March 1978) was an Italian cardinal of the Roman Catholic Church. He served as Secretary of the Sacred Congregation for the Discipline of the Sacraments in the Roman Curia from 1965 to 1969, and was elevated to the cardinalate in 1969.

== Biography ==
Giacomo Violardo was born in Govone, and studied at the seminary in Alba, the Theological Faculty of Turin (from where he obtained his licentiate in theology), and the Pontifical Roman Athenaeum S. Apollinare in Rome (earning his doctorate in canon and civil law). Ordained to the priesthood on 29 June 1923, he then furthered his studies at the Catholic University of Milan, from where he received a doctorate in jurisprudence.

From 1928 to 1935, Violardo was professor of moral theology and of canon law at the Pontifical Regional Seminary Pio XI in Fano. He was raised to the rank of Privy Chamberlain of His Holiness on 14 December 1935, and later a Domestic Prelate of His Holiness on 23 April 1939. Violardo then taught canon law (Book III) at the Pontifical Lateran University until 1964, serving as dean of the faculty of Canon Law as well. After working as auditor of the French nunciature from February to July 1938, he entered the Apostolic Signatura in the Roman Curia, as Promoter of Justice; he later became a prelate (23 April 1939) and the undersecretary (24 July 1954) of that body.

Violardo was named Secretary of the Pontifical Commission for the Authentic Interpretation of the Code of Canon Law on 2 April 1962, and of the Commission for the Revision of the Code of Canon Law in 1963. He was made Secretary of the Sacred Congregation for the Discipline of the Sacraments on 26 January 1965. As Secretary, he served as the second-highest official of that dicastery, under Benedetto Masella.

On 19 February 1966, Violardo was appointed Titular Archbishop of Satafi by Pope Paul VI. He received his episcopal consecration on the following 19 March from Pope Paul himself, with Archbishops Francesco Carpino and Ettore Cunial serving as co-consecrators, in St. Peter's Basilica. Pope Paul created him Cardinal-Deacon of Sant'Eustachio in the consistory of 28 April 1969. Violardo resigned as Secretary of Discipline of the Sacraments on the same date as the consistory, after four years of service.

Violardo died in Rome, at age 79. He is buried in the parish church of his native Govone.

Preceded by Cesare Zerba	Secretary of the Sacred Congregation for the Discipline of the Sacraments; 1965–1969	Succeeded by Giuseppe Casoria
