= Amleto Giovanni Cicognani =

Italian Cardinal of the Catholic Church

His Eminence Amleto Giovanni Cicognani
- Dean of the College of Cardinals
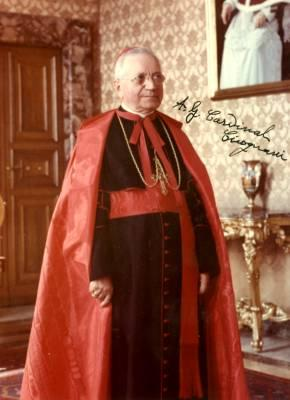
- Cicognani in 1968
- Church: Catholic
- Appointed: 24 March 1972
- Term ended: 17 December 1973
- Predecessor: Eugène-Gabriel-Gervais-Laurent Tisserant
- Successor: Luigi Traglia
- Other posts: Cardinal-Bishop of Frascati (1962–73); Cardinal-Bishop of Ostia (1972–73)
- Previous posts: Assessor of the Congregation for the Oriental Churches (1928–33); Titular Archbishop of Laodicea in Phrygia (1933–58); Apostolic Delegate to the United States of America (1933–58); Cardinal-Priest of San Clemente (1958–62); Secretary of the Congregation for the Oriental Churches (1959–61); President of the Administration of the Patrimony of the Apostolic See (1961–69); President of the Pontifical Commission for Vatican City State (1961–69); Secretary of State (1961–69); Prefect of the Council for the Public Affairs of the Church (1961–69); Cardinal-Protector of the Pontifical Ecclesiastical Academy (1961–69); President of the Commission for the Coordination of Conciliar Work (1962–65); President Delegate of the Central Commission for the Coordination of the Postconciliar Work and the Interpretation of Conciliar Resolutions (1965–67)

Orders
- Ordination: 23 September 1905 by Gioacchino Cantagalli
- Consecration: 23 April 1933 by Raffaele Carlo Rossi
- Created cardinal: 15 December 1958 by Pope John XXIII
- Rank: Cardinal-Priest (1958–62); Cardinal-Bishop (1962–73)

Personal details
- Born: Amleto Giovanni Cicognani; 24 February 1883 Brisighella, Faenza, Kingdom of Italy
- Died: 17 December 1973 (aged 90) Vatican City
- Buried: San Clemente
- Parents: Guglielmo Cicognani; Anna Ceroni
- Education: Pontifical Roman Athenaeum Saint Apollinare
- Motto: Vigilat nec fatiscit
- Coat of arms

Styles of Amleto Cicognani
- Reference style: His Eminence
- Spoken style: Your Eminence
- Informal style: Cardinal
- See: Frascati (suburbicarian), Ostia (suburbicarian)

Amleto Giovanni Cicognani (24 February 1883 – 17 December 1973) was an Italian Cardinal of the Catholic Church. He served as Vatican Secretary of State from 1961 to 1969, and Dean of the College of Cardinals from 1972 until his death. Cicognani was elevated to the cardinalate in 1958. His brother, Gaetano Cicognani, was also a cardinal. To date they are the last pair of brothers to serve together in the College of Cardinals.

== Career in the Church ==
Amleto Cicognani was born in Brisighella, near Faenza, as the younger of the two children of Guglielmo and Anna (née Ceroni) Cicognani. His widowed mother ran a general store to support him and his brother, Gaetano. After studying at the seminary in Faenza, he was ordained a priest on 23 September 1905 by Bishop Gioacchino Cantagalli. Cicognani continued his studies at the Pontifical Roman Athenaeum S. Apollinare, and in 1910 he was appointed an official of the Sacred Congregation for the Discipline of the Sacraments. First raised to the rank of monsignor in 1917, he taught at his alma mater of the Athenaeum S. Apollinare from 1921 to 1932, and then entered the Roman Curia, as substitute adjunct of the Consistorial, on 16 December 1922.

After holding a variety of pastoral and curial positions, Cicognani was appointed Apostolic Delegate to the United States and Titular Archbishop of Laodicea in Phrygia on 17 March 1933. He received his episcopal consecration on the following 23 April from Cardinal Raffaele Rossi, with Archbishops Giuseppe Pizzardo and Carlo Salotti serving as co-consecrators, in the Roman church of Santa Susanna. Cicognani would remain Apostolic Delegate to the United States, serving as liaison between the American hierarchy and the Vatican, for the next 25 years.

During World War II, Cicognani expressed reservations about Zionism. In a letter dated 22 June 1943 to American representative Myron C. Taylor, he said: "It is true that at one time Palestine was inhabited by the Hebrew Race, but there is no axiom in history to substantiate the necessity of a people returning to a country they left nineteen centuries before ... If a 'Hebrew Home' is desired, it would not be too difficult to find a more fitting territory than Palestine. With an increase in the Jewish population there, grave, new international problems would arise."

== Cardinal ==
He was created Cardinal-Priest of S. Clemente by Pope John XXIII in the consistory of 15 December 1958. Cardinal Cicognani was later raised to Cardinal-Bishop of Frascati on 23 May 1962. Because his brother, Gaetano, was already a living cardinal, having been elevated in 1953, an exception had to be made to the Church law that prohibited brothers from holding the title of cardinal simultaneously.

On 14 November 1959, Cicognani became Secretary of the Congregation for the Oriental Churches. He was later named to the posts of Cardinal Secretary of State, President of the Pontifical Commission for Vatican City State, and President of the Administration of the Patrimony of the Apostolic See on 12 August 1961. With the appointments of 1962, Cicognani essentially became the foreign minister, prime minister, and interior minister of the Vatican.

He attended the Second Vatican Council (1962–1965), at which he served as Chairman of the Secretariat for Extraordinary Questions. Cicognani was also one of the cardinal electors who participated in the 1963 papal conclave, which selected Pope Paul VI.

On 30 April 1969, Cicognani resigned all of his posts. However, on 24 March 1972, he was elected and confirmed as Dean of the College of Cardinals and thus received the title of the suburbicarian see of Ostia, in addition to his title of Cardinal Bishop of Frascati.

Cicognani died in Rome, following a brief illness, at age 90. He is buried in the Basilica di San Clemente.

He was considered to be rather conservative in his views. He sought to stem ecumenism in the Catholic Church in America, and was once described as not being open to Aggiornamento.

Diplomatic posts
Preceded by Pietro Fumasoni Biondi	Apostolic Delegate to the United States; 17 March 1933 – 14 November 1959	Succeeded by Egidio Vagnozzi
Political offices
Preceded by Domenico Tardini	Cardinal Secretary of State; 12 August 1961 – 30 April 1969	Succeeded by Jean-Marie Villot
Catholic Church titles
Preceded by Eugène-Gabriel-Gervais-Laurent Tisserant	Dean of the College of Cardinals; 24 March 1972 – 17 December 1973	Succeeded by Luigi Traglia
