= Gaetano Cicognani =

Italian cardinal (1881–1962)

His Eminence Gaetano Cicognani
- Pro-Prefect Emeritus of the Apostolic Signatura
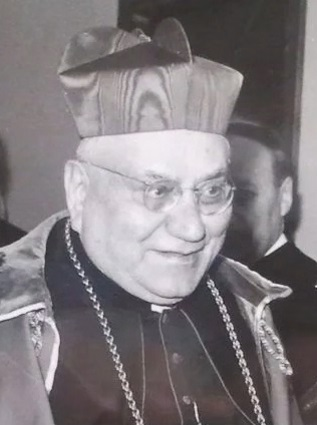
- Church: Roman Catholic Church
- Appointed: 18 November 1954
- Term ended: 14 November 1959
- Predecessor: Vincenzo Macchi
- Successor: Dino Staffa
- Other post: Cardinal-Bishop of Frascati (1959–1962)
- Previous posts: Apostolic Internuncio to Bolivia (1925–1928); Titular Archbishop of Ancyra (1925–1953); Apostolic Nuncio to Peru (1928–1936); Apostolic Nuncio to Austria (1936–1938); Apostolic Nuncio to Spain (1938–1953); Apostolic Pro-Nuncio to Spain (1953); Cardinal-Priest of Santa Cecilia (1953–1959); Prefect of the Congregation of Rites (1953–1954)

Orders
- Ordination: 24 September 1904 by Gioachino Cantagalli
- Consecration: 1 February 1925 by Pietro Gasparri
- Created cardinal: 12 January 1953 by Pope Pius XII
- Rank: Cardinal-priest (1953–1959); Cardinal-bishop (1959–1962)

Personal details
- Born: Gaetano Cicognani; 26 November 1881 Brisighella, Kingdom of Italy
- Died: 5 February 1962 (aged 80) Rome, Italy
- Education: Pontifical Roman Athenaeum S. Apollinare; Pontifical Ecclesiastical Academy
- Motto: Vigilat nec fatiscit
- Coat of arms

Styles of Gaetano Cicognani
- Reference style: His Eminence
- Spoken style: Your Eminence
- Informal style: Cardinal
- See: Frascati (suburbicarain)

Gaetano Cicognani (26 November 1881 – 5 February 1962) was an Italian cardinal of the Catholic Church. He served as prefect of the Apostolic Signatura from 1954 until his death, and was elevated to the cardinalate in 1953 by Pope Pius XII. To date, he and his brother, Amleto Giovanni Cicognani, are the last pair of brothers to serve simultaneously in the College of Cardinals.

== Biography ==
Cicognani was born in Brisighella to Guglielmo Cicognani and his wife Anna Ceroni. His brother, Amleto, was born over a year later in 1883. To support Gaetano and his brother, their widowed mother ran a general store. Cicognani studied at the seminary in Faenza, and was ordained to the priesthood by Bishop Gioacchino Cantagalli on 24 September 1904. He then went to Rome to attend the Pontifical Roman Athenaeum S. Apollinare and was, like his brother, summoned to the elite Pontifical Ecclesiastical Academy.

After working in the Roman Rota and Apostolic Signatura, Cicognani taught at the Pontifical Roman Seminary and later entered the Secretariat of State in 1915. He became secretary of the Spanish nunciature on 1 February 1916, and a privy chamberlain of his holiness on 9 March 1916. He was made auditor of the nunciature to Belgium on 3 February 1920.

On 10 January 1925, Cicognani was appointed Apostolic Internuncio to Bolivia and Titular Archbishop of Ancyra. He received his episcopal consecration on the following 1 February from Cardinal Pietro Gasparri, with Archbishops Rafaello Rossi, OCD, and Giovanni Zonghi serving as co-consecrators, in the chapel of the Pontifical Collegio Pio-Latinoamericano in Rome. Archbishop Cicognani was later named Apostolic Nuncio to Peru on 15 June 1928, to Austria on 13 June 1936, and to Spain on 16 May 1938. In April 1934, when Nuncio to Peru, he visited his brother, the Apostolic Delegate to the United States, whom Gaetano had not seen in seven years.

Pope Pius XII created him Cardinal-Priest of Santa Cecilia in his second and last consistory of 12 January 1953. Cardinal Cicognani returned to work in the Roman Curia upon his appointment as prefect of the Congregation of Rites on 7 December of that same year. He was appointed as prefect of the Apostolic Signatura on 18 November 1954 and was one of the cardinal electors who participated in the 1958 papal conclave that selected Pope John XXIII. That December, his brother, Amleto, by a special dispensation of canon law, was also elevated to the College of Cardinals. This law had so distressed Gaetano, as he felt it curbed his brother's career, that he once came close to tears when someone jokingly said "Because of you, your brother cannot become cardinal". On 14 December 1959, he was named Cardinal Bishop of Frascati by Pope John.

He died in Rome, at age 80, and is buried in the collegiate church of S. Michele in his native Brisighella.

Catholic Church titles
Preceded by Tito Trocchi	Apostolic Nuncio to Bolivia; 1925–1928	Succeeded by Carlo Chiarlo
Preceded by Joseph Petrelli	Apostolic Nuncio to Peru; 1928–1935	Succeeded by Fernando Cento
Preceded by Enrico Sibilia	Apostolic Nuncio to Austria; 1935–1938	Succeeded by Maurilio Silvan
Preceded by Federico Tedeschini	Apostolic Nuncio to Spain; 1938–1953	Succeeded by Ildebrando Antoniutti
Preceded by Clemente Micara	Prefect of the Congregation of Rites; 1953–1954	Succeeded by Arcadio Larraona Saralegui, CMF
Preceded by Giuseppe Bruno	Prefect of the Apostolic Signatura; 1954–1962	Succeeded by Francesco Roberti
