= Giuseppe Spina =

Italian cardinal

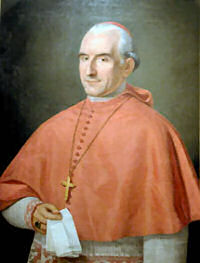
Giuseppe Spina

Giuseppe Maria Spina (11 March 1756 – 13 November 1828) was an Italian Roman Catholic cardinal.

He was born in Sarzana to an aristocratic family, and moved to Rome to study jurisprudence and canon law. In 1796, he was ordained a priest and in 1798, was appointed Titular Archbishop of Corinth. He accompanied Pope Pius VI to the Napoleon-induced residence in France, and administered his final rights. Sent to Paris by Pope Pius VII to negotiate concordat with Napoleon, he was one of the Vatican envoys who signed the agreement in July, 1801. For these services, he was made Cardinal in pectore on 23 February 1801, and later publicly ordained on 29 March 1802. He served as a papal legate to Forli and Bologna in the following years, and appointed Archbishop of Genoa (1802-1816) and in 1828, Cardinal-Bishop of Palestrina. In 1825, he was appointed Prefect of the Apostolic Signatura.
