= Alfredo Ottaviani =

Catholic cardinal

His Eminence Alfredo Ottaviani
- Pro-Prefect of the Congregation for the Doctrine of the Faith
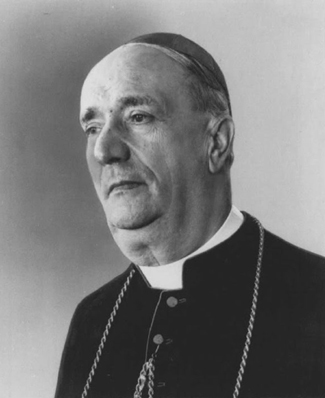
- Ottaviani in 1966
- Appointed: 9 February 1966
- Term ended: 8 January 1968
- Predecessor: Giuseppe Pizzardo
- Successor: Franjo Šeper
- Other post: Cardinal-Priest of Santa Maria in Domnica
- Previous posts: Cardinal-Deacon of Santa Maria in Domnica (1953–1967); Pro-Secretary of the Congregation of the Holy Office (1953–1959); Secretary of the Congregation of the Holy Office (1959–1966); Titular Archbishop of Berrhoea (1962)

Orders
- Ordination: 18 March 1916
- Consecration: 19 April 1962 by Pope John XXIII
- Created cardinal: 12 January 1953 by Pope Pius XII
- Rank: Cardinal-Deacon (1953–1967); Cardinal-Priest (1967–1979)

Personal details
- Born: 29 October 1890 Rome, Kingdom of Italy
- Died: 3 August 1979 (aged 88) Rome, Italy
- Buried: San Salvatore in Ossibus Church, Vatican City
- Denomination: Roman Catholic
- Parents: Enrico Ottaviani; Palmira Catalini
- Motto: Semper Idem; (Always the Same)
- Signature: Alfredo Ottaviani's signature

- Coat of arms: Alfredo Ottaviani's coat of arms

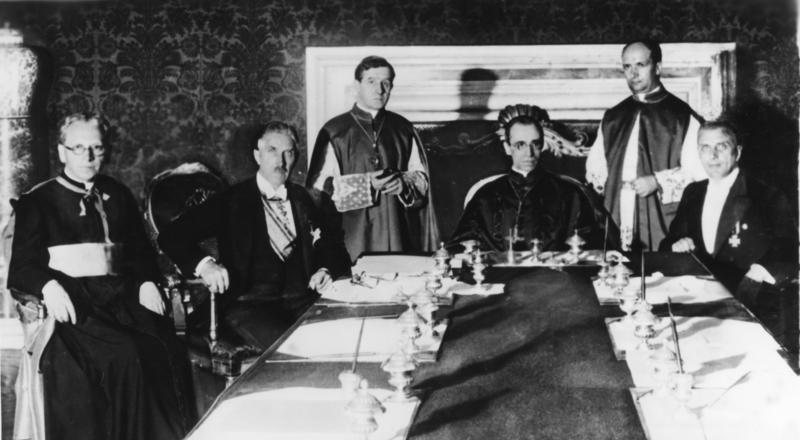
Ottaviani (second from right) at the signing of the Reichskonkordat

Alfredo Ottaviani (29 October 1890 – 3 August 1979) was an Italian cardinal of the Catholic Church. Pope Pius XII named him cardinal in 1953. He served as secretary of the Holy Office in the Roman Curia from 1959 to 1966 when that dicastery was reorganised as the Congregation for the Doctrine of the Faith, of which he was pro-prefect until 1968.

Ottaviani was a prominent figure in the Catholic Church during his time, and was the leading defender of Traditionalist Catholicism during the Second Vatican Council.

== Early life and education ==
Ottaviani was born in Rome, where his father was a baker. He studied with the Brothers of the Christian Schools in Trastevere, then at the Pontifical Roman Seminary and the Pontifical Roman Athenaeum S. Apollinare, from where he received his doctorates in philosophy, theology, and canon law. He was ordained to the priesthood on 18 March 1916.

== Holy Office/Congregation of the Doctrine of the Faith ==
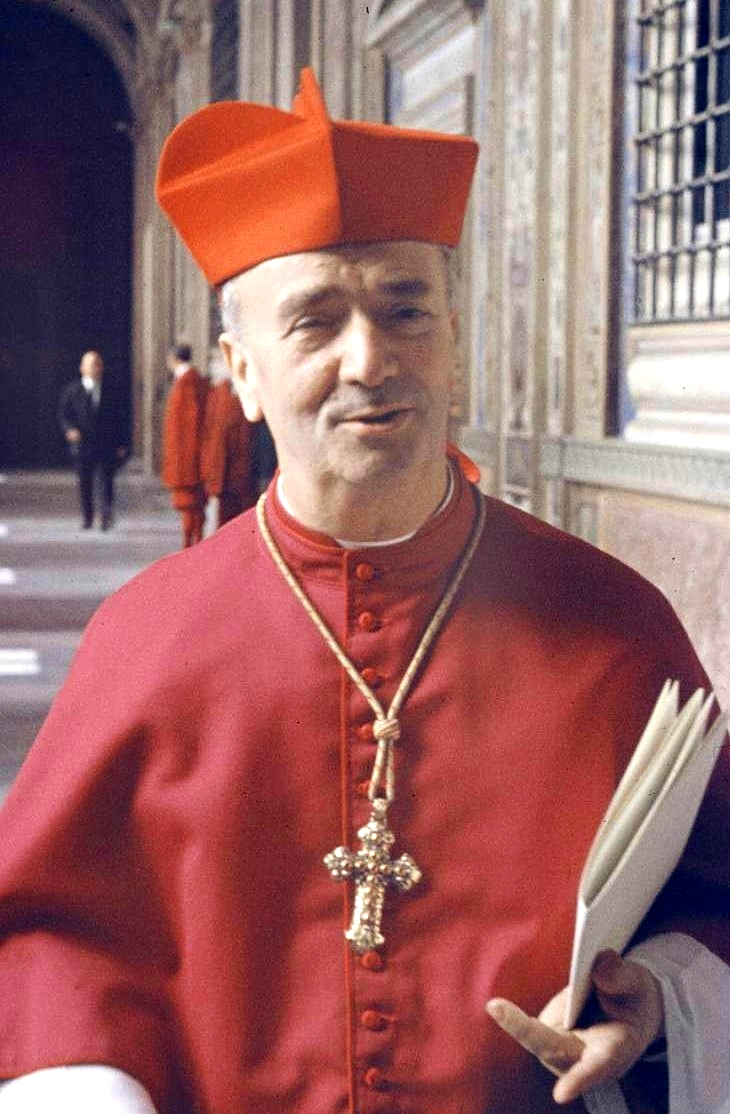
Cardinal Ottaviani in October 1958

On 12 January 1953, he was both appointed pro-secretary of the Holy Office and created Cardinal-Deacon of Santa Maria in Domnica by Pope Pius XII. He participated as a cardinal-elector in the 1958 conclave which elected Pope John XXIII.

On 7 November 1959, he was named the Vatican's chief doctrinal guardian as secretary of the Holy Office. Ottaviani was appointed Titular Archbishop of Berrhoea on 5 April 1962, receiving his episcopal consecration on the following 19 April from Pope John XXIII in person, with Cardinals Giuseppe Pizzardo and Benedetto Aloisi Masella serving as co-consecrators. His episcopal motto Semper idem ("Always the same") reflected his conservative theology. He resigned his titular see in 1963.

=== Second Vatican Council ===
Ottaviani, while opposed to the separation of Church and State and granting equal rights to all religions, supported religious tolerance if public manifestations of non-Catholic religions were suppressed when possible. His confrontation with Cardinal Augustin Bea became so intense that Cardinal Ernesto Ruffini had to intervene, noting his disappointment at such a "serious discussion". Ottaviani also argued during the debates on the liturgy and on the sources of divine revelation. Pope John XXIII appointed Ottaviani and Bea as co-chairs of a commission appointed to revise a draft of the Council schema concerned with the sources of revelation (De Fontibus Revelationis) in order to resolve the deadlock arising from debates over the first draft, leading ultimately to the presentation of revelation comprising both scripture and tradition which featured in the Dogmatic Constitution on Divine Revelation (Dei Verbum).

In 2000, John L. Allen wrote that the news media often went to Ottaviani during the council for colourful reactions to stormy working sessions: in one speech at the council, reacting to repeated mentions of "collegiality" of bishops, Ottaviani pointed out that the Bible records only one example of the apostles acting collegially, at the Garden of Gethsemane: "They all fled." In 1985 Patrick R. Granfield had already recounted the same anecdote as something that "may well be apocryphal" and attributed it not to Ottaviani but to "one Council Father".

According to Allen, Ottaviani was opposed in the movements for a rapid council by German Cardinal Josef Frings of Cologne. Frings often clashed with Ottaviani on which direction the council should take. In this, he was assisted by "a [then] progressive firebrand" who was "dissatisfied with many of the answers offered by the Church's official authorities", a young theological advisor named Joseph Ratzinger, who would later become prefect of the Congregation for the Doctrine of the Faith and then Pope Benedict XVI. Frings had heard a lecture of the young Ratzinger on issues the upcoming council could address. It seemed to Frings that Ratzinger had set forth a complete agenda for the council that was exactly what Frings himself had in mind. Frings had Ratzinger prepare the text of a lecture that Frings was to give in Rome. After the lecture, which Pope John XXIII complimented warmly, Frings told the Pope that he did not deserve credit for the speech, as it was written by one of his priests. Pope John admitted that he too delegated much of his work. The key thing was to select the right person for the job. After this conversation, Ratzinger became Frings's lead assistant during the entire council and thereafter never left Frings's service.

The acrimony felt by such liberal members of the council against Ottaviani spilled out into international news in a dramatic incident on 8 November 1963, in which Protestant observer Robert McAfee Brown described as having "blown the dome off St. Peter's"; in a working session of the council, Frings declared Ottaviani's dicastery a "source of scandal" to the whole world.

With continued worldwide interest in Vatican II another incident, in which Ottaviani breached the council's rules for debating procedure, found its way into international news. During the 30 October 1962 session, concerning changes to the Mass, he went beyond the 10-minute limit imposed on all speakers. Upon Ottaviani passing this mark Cardinal Eugène Tisserant, dean of the Council Presidents, showed his watch to the council president for the day Cardinal Bernard Alfrink of Utrecht (whom the Associated Press described as "one of the most outspoken members ... who want to see far-reaching changes inside the church."). Ottaviani, engrossed in his topic, went on condemning the proposed changes, saying, "Are we seeking to stir up wonder, or perhaps scandal, among the Christian people, by introducing changes in so venerable a rite, that has been approved for so many centuries and is now so familiar? The rite of Holy Mass should not be treated as if it were a piece of cloth to be refashioned according to the whim of each generation." When he had reached fifteen minutes, Alfrink rang a warning bell. When Ottaviani kept speaking, Alfrink signalled to a technician, who switched off the microphone. After tapping the microphone to determine it was off, the half-blind Ottaviani stumbled back to his seat in humiliation while "there was scattered applause in the council hall" by members of the council fathers who held that he had gone on too long.

Scandalized by the reaction of his fellow council fathers, Ottaviani boycotted the next six council working sessions. When Cardinal Ernesto Ruffini of Palermo presided over the 11 November session, he announced that "Ottaviani had been grieved by the 30 October incident" and asked council fathers to refrain from voicing approval or disapproval with applause. The Associated Press noted that "Ironically, the incident ... [was] favorably commented on by the non-Catholic observers attending the council, who were struck by the Democratic process and freedom of expression at the council". As he was president of the Theological Commission responsible for amending the schema on sources of religion, Ottaviani returned to the working session to champion the position of those the Associated Press called "the static traditionalists".

=== Papal conclave of 1963 ===
Ottaviani was one of the cardinal electors who participated in the 1963 papal conclave, which elected Giovanni Battista Montini as Pope Paul VI. He was also the protodeacon (senior cardinal-deacon) during the conclave, and as such, he announced Montini's election and crowned him on 30 June with the triregnum.

=== Work and retirement from the Roman Curia ===
With the change of the name of the Holy Office to the Congregation for the Doctrine of the Faith in 1965, Ottaviani was named pro-prefect of the congregation; the pope held the title of "prefect" until 1968. He was raised to the rank of cardinal-priest (with the same title) on 26 June 1967. As pro-prefect, Ottaviani had described himself as a "policeman" who protected traditional doctrine.

On 8 January 1968, Ottaviani resigned from the Church's central administration. Pope Paul VI accepted the resignation and appointed Cardinal Franjo Seper of Yugoslavia to take his place as pro-prefect for the Congregation for the Doctrine of the Faith. The event was seen as "a major turning point" by the Associated Press, noting he was being replaced "by a prelate from a Communist country that once imprisoned a Catholic cardinal ... In dramatic fashion, it signified the move of the half-billion-member church away from rigid conservatism toward new experiments in modernism and changing relations with Communist countries." He had also lost sight in one eye while the other one was "severely impaired" for some time before retirement.

In 1970, when Paul VI restricted voting in papal conclaves to cardinals under the age of 80, Ottaviani, already 80, said the Pope's action was "an act committed in contempt of tradition that is centuries old" and that he was "throwing overboard the bulk of his expert and gifted counsellors".

Ottaviani died on 3 August 1979.

== Impacts and influences ==
=== Karl Rahner ===
At the beginning of 1962, Ottaviani notified the Jesuit superiors of theologian Karl Rahner that Rahner had been placed under Roman pre-censorship. That meant that the prolific theology professor could no longer publish or lecture without permission. A few months later, in November 1962, Pope John XXIII appointed Rahner to be peritus (an expert advisor) to and at the Second Vatican Council. Since Rahner accompanied the Cardinal Archbishop of Vienna, Franz König, as a theological consultant, Ottaviani did not throw Rahner out of the council in spite of the earlier silencing.

=== Ottaviani Intervention ===
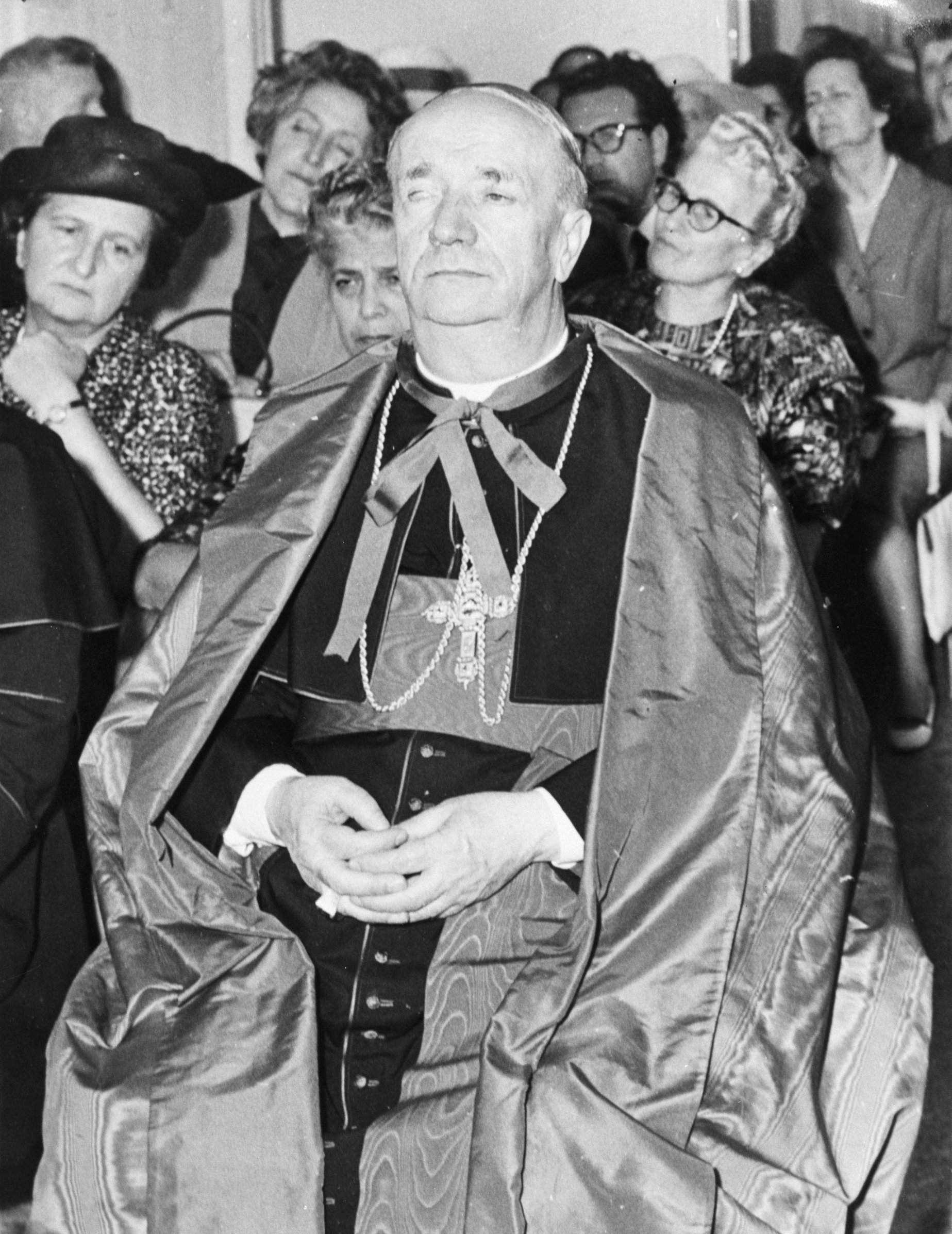
Ottaviani in December 1962

On 25 September 1969, Ottaviani and Cardinal Antonio Bacci wrote a letter to Paul VI in support of a study by a group of theologians who criticized the new Order of Mass and the new General Instruction. Those are two parts of the revised Roman Missal that had been promulgated on 3 April of that year, but that actually appeared in full only in 1970. This letter became widely known as the Ottaviani Intervention.

=== Ecclesiastical procedure in cases of solicitation ===
In 1962, as head, under the Pope, of the Holy Office, Ottaviani signed its document known by its incipit Crimen sollicitationis, which had as subtitle On the Manner of Proceeding in Cases of the Crime of Sollicitation. It laid down detailed rules about the procedure for ecclesiastical tribunals to follow if a priest was accused of making sexual advances connected in any way with the sacrament of confession. Judges and other officials of the tribunal ("each and everyone pertaining to the tribunal in any way") would be subject to automatic excommunication if they revealed anything about the conduct of the trial, even after the verdict had been declared and put into effect. This penalty did not apply to accusers and other witnesses; on the contrary, anyone with knowledge of the crime who failed to denounce it within one month was subject to automatic excommunication and could be absolved only after actually denouncing the priest or at least promising seriously to do so. Violation of secrecy by the accused was also punished not by excommunication but by suspension.

In 2003, 24 years after Ottaviani's death, media reports presented this document as an attempt to "hide sexual abuse". Some reported that even accusers were subjected to excommunication if they made their accusations known, and that the document was stored in the Vatican Secret Archives, where it was discovered by a lawyer pursuing cases on behalf of victims of abuse by Catholic priests. In fact, the 69-page document was sent to "all Patriarchs, Archbishops, Bishops and other Local Ordinaries, including those of Eastern Rite" and was to be found, even if after forty years it was generally forgotten, among the papers in their successors' offices. While media reports also suggested that the ecclesiastical verdict was never to be made known, the document spoke of the verdict being "declared" and "put into effect", and the punishments laid down in canon law were: "He is to be suspended from celebrating Mass and hearing sacramental confessions and, if the gravity of the crime calls for it, he is to be declared unfit for hearing them; he is to be deprived of all benefices and ranks, of the right to vote or be voted for, and is to be declared unfit for all of them, and in more serious cases he is to be reduced to the lay state." These punishments were of public character and not subject to secrecy.

=== Forbidden books ===
As secretary of the Holy Office, Ottaviani was responsible for the banning of a number of books, which would accordingly have been included in any new edition of the Index Librorum Prohibitorum (Index of Prohibited Books). The Index, the last edition of which had been published in 1948, was abolished by Pope Paul VI in 1966.

==== Faustina Kowalska ====
On 6 March 1959, the Holy Office issued a notification that forbade circulation of "images and writings that promote devotion to Divine Mercy in the forms proposed by Sister Faustina" (emphasis in the original). Faustina Kowalska was a Polish nun who in her diary recounted conversations with Jesus Christ. Since at least 2002, it is claimed the negative judgement of the Holy Office was based on misunderstanding due to the latter's use of a faulty French or Italian translation of the diary. However, the ban at the time was due to "serious theological reservations -- Faustina’s claim that Jesus had promised a complete remission of sin for certain devotional acts that only the sacraments can offer, for example, or what Vatican evaluators felt to be an excessive focus on Faustina herself." It was with Ottaviani's approval that Archbishop Karol Wojtyła of Kraków began in 1965 the informative process on Faustina's life and virtues, and the ban on her work was reversed by Pope Paul VI in 1978.

==== Maria Valtorta ====
Ottaviani was critical of the writings of the bed-ridden Maria Valtorta, who reported visions of Jesus and Mary.

Carinci and Bea facilitated a meeting between the Servite Order priests and Pope Pius XII, and the event was announced in L'Osservatore Romano.

Valtorta's notebooks were published in 1956 by Michele Pisani as The Poem of the Man-God.

A year after the death of Pius XII, Ottaviani placed the work among the list of books he presented to the newly appointed Pope John XXIII, who signed in January 1960 the decree banning all the books on the list.

Catholic Church titles
Preceded by Nicola Canali	Cardinal Protodeacon; 3 August 1961 – 26 June 1967	Succeeded by Arcadio Larraona Saralegui
