= Dino Staffa =

Italian cardinal

His Eminence Dino Staffa
- Prefect of the Apostolic Signatura
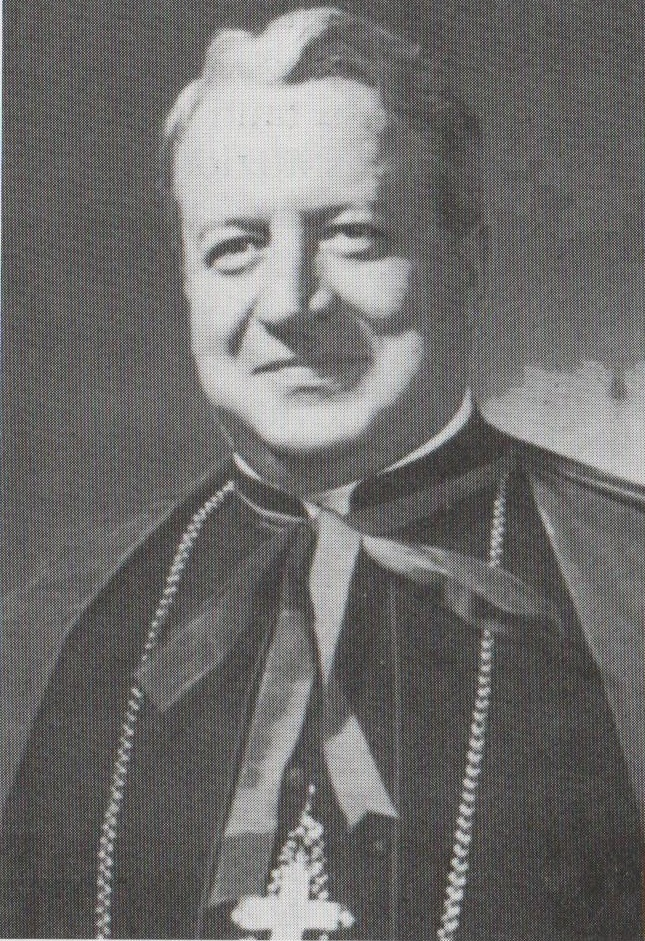
- Dino Staffa (between 1960 and 1970)
- Church: Roman Catholic Church
- Appointed: 26 March 1969
- Term ended: 7 August 1977
- Predecessor: Francesco Roberti
- Successor: Pericle Felici
- Other post: Cardinal-Priest of Santa Maria sopra Minerva (1976–77)
- Previous posts: Consultant of Justice of the Secretariat of State (1958–67); Secretary of the Congregation of Seminaries and Universities (1958–67); Titular Archbishop of Cesarea in Palaestina (1960–67); Pro-Prefect of the Apostolic Signatura (1967–69); Cardinal-Priest of Sacro Cuore di Cristo Re pro hac vice (1967–76)

Orders
- Ordination: 25 May 1929 by Paolino Giovanni Tribbioli
- Consecration: 28 October 1960 by Pope John XXIII
- Created cardinal: 26 June 1967 by Pope Paul VI
- Rank: Cardinal-priest

Personal details
- Born: Dino Staffa; 14 August 1906 Santa Maria in Fabriago, Imola, Kingdom of Italy
- Died: 7 August 1977 (aged 70) Rome, Italy
- Parents: Domenico Staffa; Emilia Gualandi
- Education: Pontifical Roman Athenaeum Saint Apollinare
- Motto: Lex Tua lux mea

Styles of Dino Staffa
- Reference style: His Eminence
- Spoken style: Your Eminence
- Informal style: Cardinal
- See: none

Dino Staffa (14 August 1906 – 7 August 1977) was an Italian cardinal of the Roman Catholic Church. He served as prefect of the Apostolic Signatura from 1967 until his death, and was elevated to the cardinalate in 1967.

== Biography ==
=== Early life and ordination ===
Dino Staffa was born in Santa Maria in Fabriago, Lugo, to Domenico and Emilia (née Gualandi) Staffa. He studied at the seminary in Imola from 1917 to 1922, and then entered the Pontifical Regional Seminary of Bologna, where the future Marcello Cardinal Mimmi was rector. After earning his doctorate in theology, Staffa was ordained to the priesthood by Bishop Paolino Tribbioli, OFM Cap, on 25 May 1929.

=== Pastoral work ===
He then did pastoral work in Imola until 1931, and furthered his studies at the Pontifical Roman Athenaeum Saint Apollinare in Rome, from where he obtained a doctorate in canon and civil law in 1933. While performing pastoral ministry in Rome from 1933 to 1950, Staffa was raised to the rank of privy chamberlain of his holiness on 4 January 1936.

=== Curial work ===
He taught history of canon law at the Pontifical Lateran University from 1941 to 1944, when he was made auditor of the Roman Rota in the Roman Curia on 20 November. Staffa was named secretary of the Sacred Congregation of Seminaries and Universities on 18 December 1958. In this position, he would serve as the second-highest official of that dicastery, under Cardinal Giuseppe Pizzardo.

=== Archbishop ===
On 3 September 1960 Staffa was appointed Titular Archbishop of Caesarea in Palaestina in association with his post as secretary of Seminaries and Universities. He received his episcopal consecration on the following 28 October from Pope John XXIII, with Archbishop Diego Venini and Bishop Benigno Carrara serving as co-consecrators, in St. Peter's Basilica. From 1962 to 1965, Staffa attended the Second Vatican Council.

=== Cardinal ===
Pope Paul VI, whose reign Staffa predicted to be "truly great", later named him as pro-prefect of the Apostolic Signatura on 7 April 1967, and created him Cardinal-Priest of S. Cuore di Cristo Re in the consistory of 26 June 1967.

Staffa became full prefect of the Apostolic Signatura on 26 March 1969. In 1972, the cardinal lowered the high costs involved in receiving an annulment from the Roman Rota.

Staffa was made cardinal priest of Santa Maria sopra Minerva on 24 May 1976 and later died in Rome seven days short of his 71st birthday. He was buried in his family's tomb in Massa Lombarda.

== Views ==
=== Catholic universities ===
The archbishop was believed to have written a decree issued by his congregation on 25 May 1963 that demanded that Catholic universities receive the Vatican's approval before awarding honorary degrees.

=== Hans Küng ===
After Saint Louis University in the US state of Missouri granted an honorary doctorate of laws to the liberal theologian Hans Küng, Staffa claimed that Catholic universities had been giving out several honorary degrees to those "not worthy of merit". He also said that "there are many periti of the Council who speak stupidities" and that "if we give honorary doctorates to him, it would seem that we approve his ideas".

=== Collegiality ===
Not overly supportive of collegiality, Staffa once declared that "supreme power over the entire flock of the faithful was entrusted to Peter and Peter alone".

| Preceded by Carlo Confalonieri | Secretary of the Sacred Congregation of Seminaries and Universities; 1958–1967 | Succeeded by Joseph Schröffer |
| Preceded by Francesco Roberti | Prefect of the Apostolic Signatura; 1967–1977 | Succeeded by Pericle Felici |
