= Cesare Zerba =

Italian cardinal (1892–1973)

His Eminence Cesare Zerba
- Secretary of the Congregation of Sacramental Discipline
- Church: Roman Catholic Church
- Appointed: 18 December 1958
- Term ended: 26 January 1965
- Predecessor: Francesco Bracci
- Successor: Giacomo Violardo
- Other post: Cardinal-Priest pro hac vice of Nostra Signora del Sacro Cuore (1965-73)
- Previous posts: Undersecretary of the Congregation of Sacramental Discipline (1939-58); Titular Archbishop of Colossae (1962-65)

Orders
- Ordination: 4 July 1915
- Consecration: 21 September 1962 by Pope John XXIII
- Created cardinal: 22 February 1965 by Pope Paul VI
- Rank: Cardinal-Priest

Personal details
- Born: Cesare Zerba; 15 April 1892 Castelnuovo Scrivia, Kingdom of Italy
- Died: 11 July 1973 (aged 81) Rome, Italy
- Education: Pontifical Roman Athenaeum S. Apollinare
- Motto: Arx mea Dominus
- Coat of arms

Styles of Cesare Zerba
- Reference style: His Eminence
- Spoken style: Your Eminence
- Informal style: Cardinal
- See: none

Cesare Zerba (15 April 1892 – 11 July 1973) was an Italian cardinal of the Roman Catholic Church. He served as Secretary of the Sacred Congregation for the Discipline of the Sacraments in the Roman Curia from 1958 to 1965, and was elevated to the cardinalate in 1965.

== Biography ==
Cesare Zerba was born in Castelnuovo Scrivia, and studied at the seminaries in Stazzano and Tortona, the Pontifical Roman Athenaeum S. Apollinare in Rome, and the University of Pavia. Ordained to the priesthood on 4 July 1915, he then served as a military chaplain during World War I. Zerba began pastoral work in Rome from 1919, also working as an official of Sacred Congregation for the Discipline of the Sacraments in the Roman Curia from 1924 to 1939.

He was raised to the rank of Privy Chamberlain of His Holiness on 30 June 1932, and later a Domestic Prelate of His Holiness and prelate of the Apostolic Signatura on 23 April 1939. Within the Congregation for the Discipline of the Sacraments, Zerba was made Undersecretary (5 May 1939) and Secretary (18 December 1958).

On 28 August 1962 Zerba was appointed Titular Archbishop of Colossae by Pope John XXIII. He received his episcopal consecration on the following 21 September from Pope John himself, with Archbishops Francesco Carpino and Pietro Parente serving as co-consecrators, in the Lateran Basilica. From 1962 to 1965, Zerba attended the Second Vatican Council.

Pope Paul VI created him Cardinal Priest of Nostra Signora del Sacro Cuore in the consistory of 22 February 1965. Zerba resigned as Secretary of Discipline of the Sacraments on 26 January 1965, after six years of service. Never having the opportunity to participate in a papal conclave, the Cardinal lost the right to do so upon reaching the age of 80 on 15 April 1972.

Zerba died in Rome, at age 81. He is buried in his native Castelnuovo Scrivia.

Preceded by Francesco Bracci	Secretary of the Sacred Congregation for the Discipline of the Sacraments; 1958–1965	Succeeded by Giacomo Violardo
