= Pontifical Roman Athenaeum Saint Apollinare =

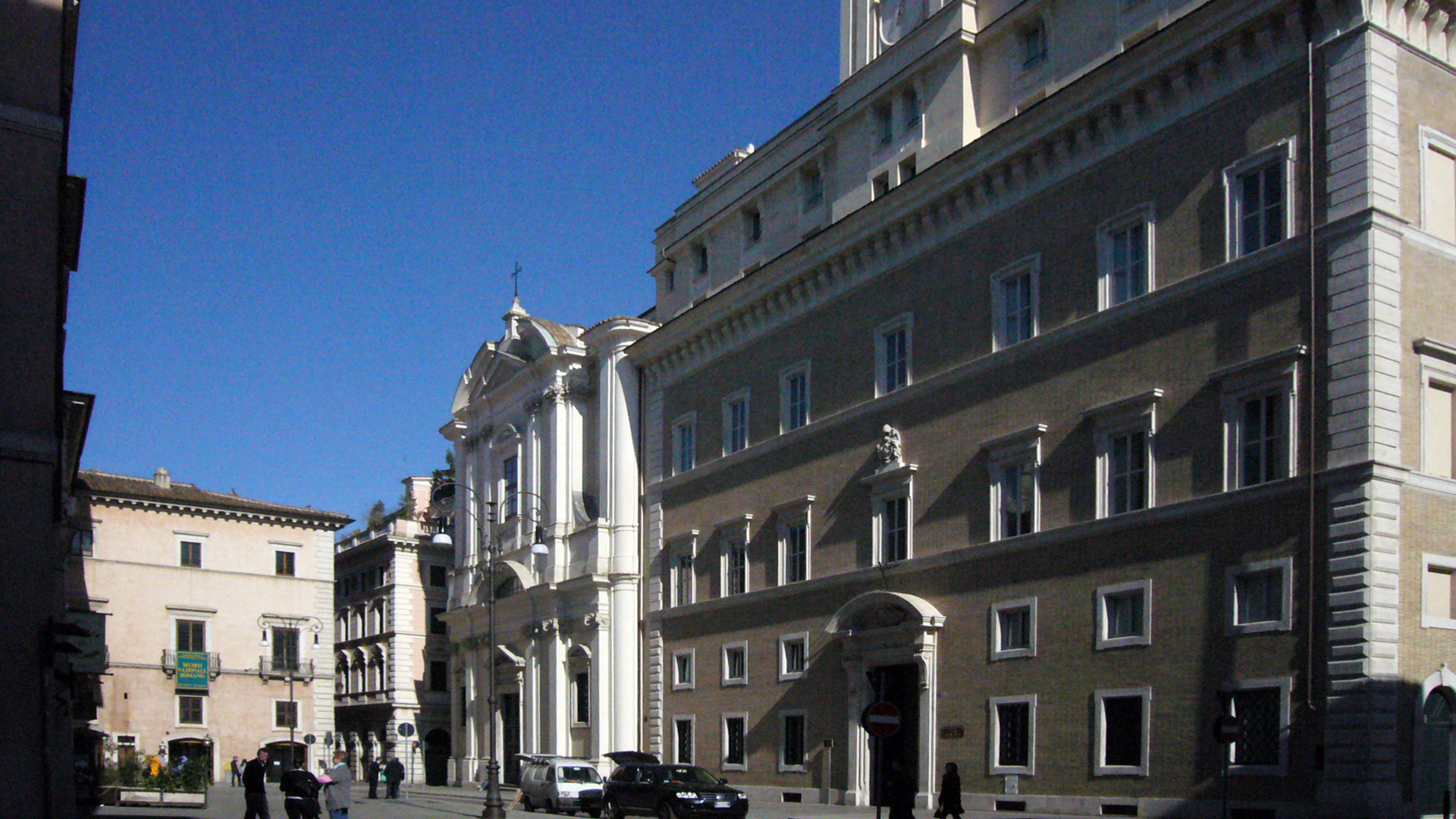
S Apollinare

Pontifical Roman Athenaeum S. Apollinare is a former pontifical university in Rome, named after St. Apollinaris of Ravenna. Its facilities are now occupied by the Pontifical University of the Holy Cross.

Initially, the Palace of St. Apollinare was used as a residence for various cardinals, until 1574, when Pope Gregory XIII gave the building to the Jesuits for the German College.

== History ==
Previously the premises was the site of the Palace of St. Apollinare in the northern area of the Piazza Navona. Around 1417, Martin V gave Cardinal Branda da Castiglione the use of the Palazzo di Sant'Apollinare in the Piazza Navona. In 1455, Cardinal Guillaume d'Estouteville took up residence there, and built the Church of S. Agostino just to the east.

=== Collegium Germanicum et Hungaricum ===
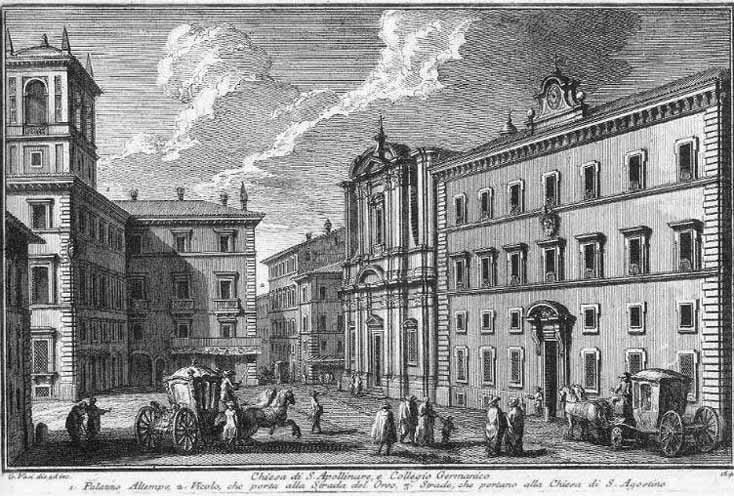
Collegio Germanico, 1755

In January 1574, Pope Gregory XIII granted the property to the Jesuits as the seat of the Collegium Germanicum. Founded by Ignatius Loyola, it is, after the Capranica, the oldest college in Rome. The students studied at the Collegio Romano, founded by Ignatius in 1551. In 1575, Gregory gave the college charge of the services in the adjoining church of Sant'Apollinare alle Terme Neroniane-Alessandrine. The Collegium Germanicus became well known for its music and drew large crowds to the church. In 1580, it merged with the Collegium Hungaricum, founded in 1578, to become the Pontificium Collegium Germanicum et Hungaricum de Urbe.

By the late 17th century, the church was in a poor state of repair. Its rebuilding was considered over a long period but wasn't carried out, probably due to the lack of funds. Despite this, in 1702 a chapel was redecorated and dedicated to St Francis Xavier, and a statue of the saint was commissioned from French sculptor Pierre Le Gros. In 1742, Pope Benedict XIV commissioned Ferdinando Fuga to rebuild the church. (The statue of Francis Xavier was preserved and remains in situ). On the completion of the church, a new Palace of S. Apollinare was erected. With the suppression of the Jesuits in 1773, direction of the college was taken over by secular clergy. The college was closed in 1798, when the French army occupied the city but was reopened in 1818 and eventually relocated to the Via S. Nicola da Tolentino.

=== Seminario Romano ===
In 1824, when Pope Leo XII transferred the Seminario Romano to the Palazzo di Sant'Apollinare, formerly occupied by the Collegio Germanico. The students were intended to serve as diocesan priests in Rome. The Pontificio Seminario Pio was founded in 1853 by Pope Pius IX for the dioceses of the Papal States and was intended for seminarians from all regions of Italy. Pius added two floors to the seminary building in order to locate the Seminario Pio in the Palazzo di S. Apollinare. In 1913 it was merged with the major division of the "Roman Seminary" to form the Pontificio Seminario Romano Maggior, and relocated to the Lateran. From that date until 1920, the Vincentian Fathers occupied settled in the Palace, their own building having been seized by the government to build the Palazzo Montecitorio for the Italian Chamber of Deputies.

=== Pontifical Institute of St. Apollinare ===
Pope Benedict XV made the Palace the seat of the Pontifical Institute of St. Apollinare. Eugenio Pacelli (the future Pius XII) and Angelo Roncalli (future John XXIII) studied there.

In 1910, Pius X founded the "Higher School of Sacred Music". Four years later, it was raised to a Pontifical Institution with the power to confer academic degrees. In 1983 the Pontifical Institute of Sacred Music re-located to the Abbey of San Girolamo in Urbe, where teaching and daily liturgy are carried out, whereas the legal and historical headquarters continued to be in Sant’Apollinare.

Since 1990, the Palace has been the seat of the Pontifical University of the Holy Cross.

==== Notable people who have attended S Apollinare ====
- Eugenio Pacelli (later Pope Pius XII)
- Angelo Giuseppe Roncalli (later Pope John XXIII)
- Alfredo Ottaviani
- Amleto Giovanni Cicognani
- Eugène-Gabriel-Gervais-Laurent Tisserant
- Benedetto Aloisi Masella
- Gustavo Testa
- Valerio Valeri
- Francesco Roberti
- Arcadio Larraona Saralegui
- Karel Kašpar
- Pietro Ciriaci
- André-Damien-Ferdinand Jullien
- Massimo Massimi
- Cesare Zerba
- Bolesław Filipiak
- Luigi Lavitrano
- Gaetano Cicognani
- Carlo Salotti
- Vincenzo Lapuma
- Dino Staffa
- Mario Nasalli Rocca di Corneliano
- Umberto Mozzoni
- Sergio Guerri
- Carlo Grano
- Giacomo Violardo
- Evaristo Lucidi
- Federico Cattani Amadori
- Ermenegildo Pellegrinetti
- Benedetto Lorenzelli
- Filippo Giustini
- Domenico Jacobini
