= Carlo Salotti =

Italian Catholic cardinal (1870–1947)

His Eminence Carlo Salotti
- Prefect of the Congregation for Rites
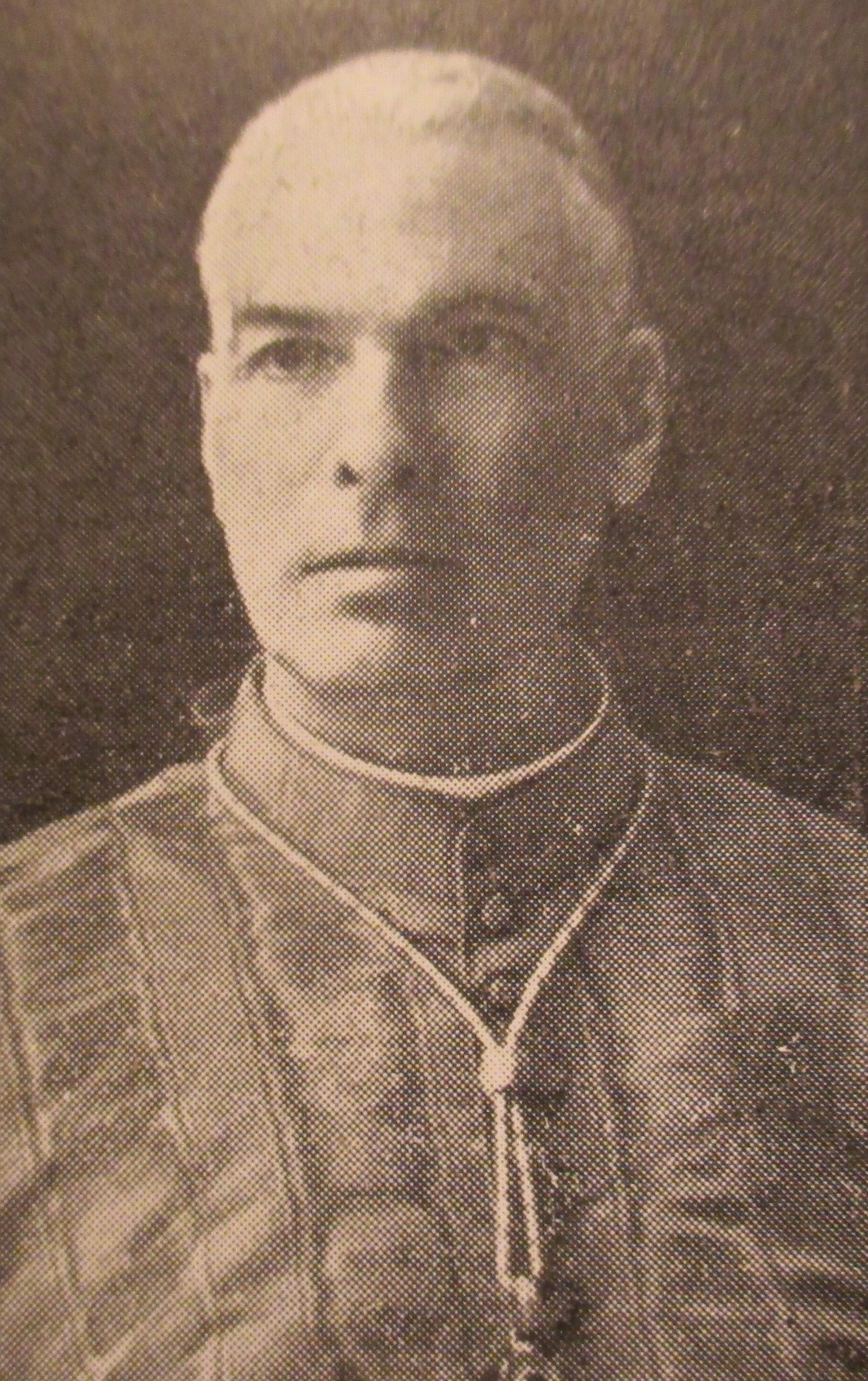
- Salotti circa 1939
- Church: Roman Catholic Church
- Appointed: 14 September 1938
- Term ended: 24 October 1947
- Predecessor: Camillo Laurenti
- Successor: Gaetano Cicognani
- Other post: Cardinal-Bishop of Palestrina (1939–47)
- Previous posts: Titular Archbishop of Philippopolis in Thracia (1930–35); Secretary of the Congregation for the Propagation of the Faith (1930–35); Cardinal-Priest of San Bartolomeo all'Isola (1935–39)

Orders
- Ordination: 22 September 1894
- Consecration: 6 July 1930 by Wilhelmus Marinus van Rossum
- Created cardinal: 13 March 1933 (in pectore); 16 December 1935 (revealed) by Pope Pius XI
- Rank: Cardinal-priest (1935–39); Cardinal-bishop (1939–47)

Personal details
- Born: Carlo Salotti; 25 July 1870 Grotte di Castro, Montefiascone, Viterbo, Papal States
- Died: 24 October 1947 (aged 77) Rome, Italy
- Parents: Giuseppe Salotti; Orsola Capozzi
- Education: Pontifical Roman Athenaeum Saint Apollinare
- Motto: Labor pro fide

Styles of Carlo Salotti
- Reference style: His Eminence
- Spoken style: Your Eminence
- Informal style: Cardinal
- See: Palestrina (suburbicarian)

Carlo Salotti (25 July 1870 – 24 October 1947) was an Italian cardinal of the Roman Catholic Church. He served as Secretary of the Congregation for the Propagation of the Faith from 1930 until 1935 and as prefect of the Congregation of Rites from 1938 until his death, and was elevated to the cardinalate in pectore in 1933.

== Biography ==
Born in Grotte di Castro, Carlo Salotti attended the seminary in Orvieto before going to Rome, where he studied at the Pontifical Roman Athenaeum S. Apollinare and the Royal University. He was ordained to the priesthood on 22 September 1894, and then finished his studies in 1897. While performing his pastoral ministry in Rome until 1912, Salotti became a professor at his alma mater of the Pontifical Roman Athenaeum S. Apollinare in 1902. On 20 July 1915, he was raised to the rank of Domestic Prelate of His Holiness. He entered the Roman Curia on 10 July 1915 as assessor of the Congregation of Rites and subpromoter of the Faith, later becoming full Promoter of the Faith in 1925.

On 30 June 1930, Salotti was appointed Titular Archbishop of Philippopolis in Thracia by Pope Pius XI, and Secretary of the Congregation for the Propagation of the Faith, where he served under Cardinals van Rossum and Pietro Fumasoni Biondi, and rector of the Pontifical Urbaniana University four days later, on 3 July. He received his episcopal consecration on the following 6 July from Cardinal Willem van Rossum, CSsR, with Bishops Luigi Olivarès, SDB, and Giovanni Rosi serving as co-consecrators, in the basilica of Sacro Cuore di Gesù a Castro Pretorio. During his tenure as rector of the Urbaniana University, he founded the Scientific Missionary Institute of the same university.

Salotti praised Pope Pius XI for his dedication to missionary activity on Vatican Radio in October 1931, and the Pope appreciated Salotti's work as Secretary of the Congregation and accordingly elevated the Bishop to the College of Cardinals on 13 March 1933 but did so only anonymously (in pectore), so as to allow him to continue his work in that field. His appointment as Cardinal-Priest of San Bartolomeo all'Isola was published in the consistory of 16 December 1935. On 14 September 1938, Salotti was named Prefect of the Congregation of Rites and participated in the 1939 papal conclave that selected Pope Pius XII, who advanced him to Cardinal Bishop of Palestrina on 11 December 1939.

Salotti died from a liver ailment in Rome, at age 77. He is buried in his native Grotte di Castro.

Catholic Church titles
Preceded by Francesco Marchetti-Selvaggiani	Secretary of the Congregation for the Propagation of the Faith; 6 July 1930 – 16 December 1935	Succeeded by Celso Costantini
Preceded by Camillo Laurenti	Prefect of the Congregation of Rites; 14 September 1938 – 24 October 1947	Succeeded by Clemente Micara
