= Eugène Tisserant =

French cardinal

His Eminence Eugène Tisserant
- Dean of the College of Cardinals
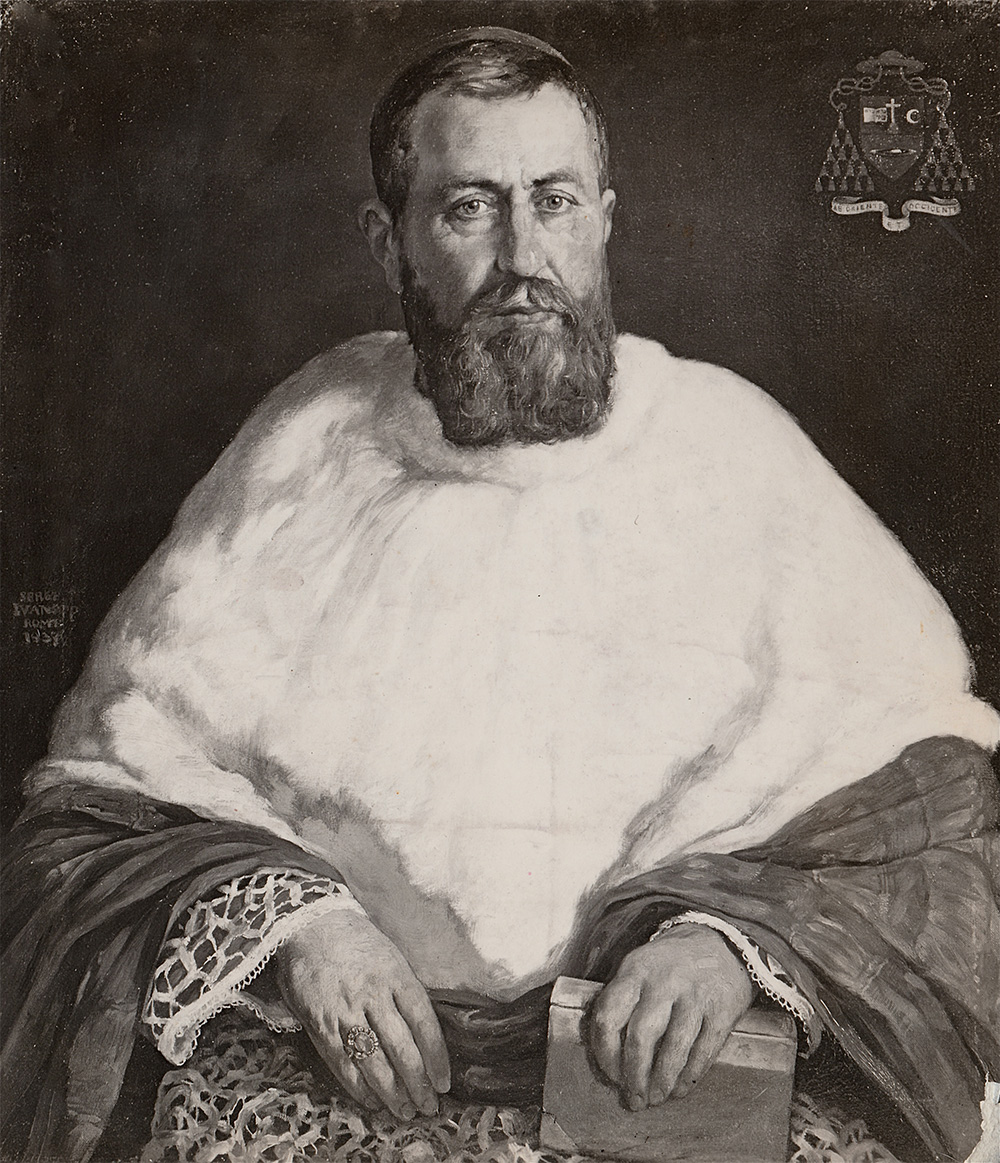
- Portrait by Serge Ivanoff, 1937
- Church: Roman Catholic Church
- Appointed: 13 January 1951
- Term ended: 21 February 1972
- Predecessor: Francesco Marchetti Selvaggiani
- Successor: Amleto Giovanni Cicognani
- Other posts: Cardinal-Bishop of Ostia (1951–1972); Cardinal-Bishop of Porto e Santa Rufina (1946–1972); Grand Master of the Equestrian Order of the Holy Sepulchre of Jerusalem (1960–1972)
- Previous posts: Cardinal-Deacon of Santi Vito, Modesto e Crescenzia (1936–1937); Secretary of the Congregation for the Oriental Churches (1936–1959); Titular Archbishop of Iconium (1937–1946); Cardinal-Priest of Ss. Vito, Modesto e Crescenzia (1937–1939); Cardinal-Priest of S. Maria sopra Minerva (1939–1946); Prefect of the Congregation of Ceremonies (1951–1967); Librarian of the Vatican Library (1957–1971); Archivist of the Vatican Secret Archives (1957–1971)

Orders
- Ordination: 4 August 1907 by Charles-François Turinaz
- Consecration: 25 July 1937 by Eugenio Pacelli
- Created cardinal: 15 June 1936 by Pius XI
- Rank: Cardinal Bishop

Personal details
- Born: Eugène Gabriel Gervais Laurent Tisserant; 24 March 1884 Nancy, France
- Died: 21 February 1972 (aged 87) Albano Laziale, Province of Rome, Italy
- Denomination: Roman Catholic
- Motto: Ab oriente et occidente (From the east and the west)
- Coat of arms

Styles of Eugène Tisserant
- Reference style: His Eminence
- Spoken style: Your Eminence
- Religious style: Cardinal
- Informal style: Cardinal
- See: Porto e Santa Rufina (suburbicarian), Ostia (suburbicarian)

Eugène-Gabriel-Gervais-Laurent Tisserant (pronounced [øʒɛn ɡabʁijɛl ʒɛʁvɛ loʁɑ̃ tisʁɑ̃]; 24 March 1884 – 21 February 1972) was a French prelate and cardinal of the Catholic Church. Elevated to the cardinalate in 1936, Tisserant was a prominent and long-time member of the Roman Curia.

== Early life and ordination ==
Tisserant was born in Nancy to Hippolyte and Octavée (née Connard) Tisserant. From 1900 to 1904, he studied theology, Sacred Scripture, Hebrew, Syriac, Old Testament, and Oriental Patrology at the seminary in Nancy. He then studied in Jerusalem under Marie-Joseph Lagrange, O.P., but returned to France in 1905 for military service. On 4 August 1907, Tisserant was ordained a priest by Charles-François Turinaz, Bishop of Nancy.

== Professor and prelate ==
Tisserant served as a professor at the Pontifical Roman Athenaeum S. Apollinare and curator at the Vatican Library from 1908 to 1914, at which time he became an intelligence officer in the French Army during World War I. He was reportedly fluent in thirteen languages: Amharic, Arabic, Akkadian, English, French (native language), German, Greek, Hebrew, Italian, Latin, Persian, Russian and Syriac.

Named assistant librarian of the Vatican Library in 1919 and Monsignor in 1921, Tisserant became Pro-Prefect of the Vatican Library on 15 November 1930 and was named a protonotary apostolic on 13 January 1936.

== Cardinal and curial appointments ==
In the consistory of 15 June 1936, Tisserant was created Cardinal-Deacon by Pope Pius XI, assigned as his titular church the Basilica of Santi Vito, Modesto e Crescenzia. He was raised to the rank of Cardinal Priest soon afterwards, retaining the same title. On 25 June 1937, Tisserant was appointed the Titular Archbishop of Iconium by Pope Pius XI. He received his consecration on the following 25 July from Cardinal Eugenio Pacelli (later Pope Pius XII), with Archbishop Giuseppe Migone and Bishop Charles-Joseph-Eugène Ruch serving as co-consecrators, in St. Peter's Basilica. He participated in the conclave of 1939, which elected Pacelli as Pope Pius XII. With the new pontiff's permission, he switched from his titular church to that of Santa Maria sopra Minerva.

Tisserant held a number of offices in the Roman Curia. He served as secretary of the Congregation for the Oriental Churches (1936–1959), as president of the Pontifical Biblical Commission (1938–1946) and as Prefect of the Congregation of Ceremonies (1951–1967). From 1957 to 1971, he served as Librarian and Archivist of the Holy Roman Church. Under Pius XII, Tisserant also headed a commission to investigate alleged abuses of appointments in the Order of Malta, which concluded that there was no wrongdoing.

In 1939, Tisserant urged Pius XII to promulgate an encyclical "on the duty of Catholics to resist the unjust orders of an authoritarian state." After the outbreak of World War II, Pius XII refused to release Tisserant as the head of the Vatican Library, preventing him from returning to France to serve in the army.

In 1946, Tisserant was elevated to the rank of Cardinal Bishop by Pope Pius, taking the title of Porto e Santa Rufina in 1946. After serving as vice-dean of the College of Cardinals from 1947 to 1951, he became dean and Cardinal Bishop of Ostia on 13 January 1951. As dean of the Sacred College, he presided at the Funeral Masses of Popes Pius XII and John XXIII and presided over the conclaves to elect their successors in 1958 and 1963. During the 1958 conclave, he was seen as papabile by most Vatican-watchers, and it is generally believed that he received at least five votes in the early balloting. In 1956, Tisserant received an honorary doctorate from Coimbra University, and in 1961, he was elected a member of the Académie Française.

=== Second Vatican Council and beyond ===
From 1962 to 1965, Tisserant attended the Second Vatican Council and sat on its Board of Presidency. As Dean of the College of Cardinals, he was the celebrant of the Mass coram Summo Pontifice at the opening ceremony of the council, before the Pope delivered the council's opening address and the other rites specific to the opening of a general council were performed.

He is said to have participated in negotiating a secret 1960s agreement between Soviet and Vatican officials that authorised Eastern Orthodox participation in the Second Vatican Council in exchange for a noncondemnation of atheistic communism during the conciliar assemblies. As Dean of the Sacred College, he was the first person after Pope Paul VI to sign each of the acts of the Second Vatican Council.

In 1962, Tisserant became Grand Master of the Order of the Holy Sepulchre, a position that he held until his death. In 1969, he demanded a retraction from Cardinal Leo Joseph Suenens, Archbishop of Brussels-Mechelen, for the "defamatory and slanderous" statements that he allegedly made against the bureaucracy of the Roman Curia. In 1970, when Paul VI's new retirement rules restricted the right to vote in papal conclaves to cardinals under age 80, Tisserant, then 86, objected on the basis that each cardinal's health should determine his fitness and suggested that 73-year-old Paul VI seemed frail. Tisserant regarded this change as being directed personally at him and had strained relations with Paul VI. He had become more conservative in his later years and "often expressed concern over liberal trends in the Church."

== Death ==
Tisserant died in 1972 from a heart attack in Albano Laziale, at age 87. Pope Paul VI took part in his funeral service. He is buried in the Basilica of Porto e Santa Rufina in Rome. There was some controversy after the death of Cardinal Tisserant in regards to his estate. His niece, Paule Hennequin, accused the Vatican of keeping many personal diaries and letters belonging to the late Cardinal, including 12 suitcases worth of documents.

Ordination history of Eugène Tisserant
History
Priestly ordination
- Ordained by: Charles-François Turinaz (Nancy)
- Date: 4 August 1907
Episcopal consecration
- Principal consecrator: Eugenio Card Pacelli (Gio & Pao)
- Co-consecrators: Giuseppe Migone (Nicomedia tit); Charles Ruch (Strasbourg)
- Date: 25 July 1937
Cardinalate
- Elevated by: Pius XI
- Date: 15 June 1936
Episcopal succession
Bishops consecrated by Eugène Tisserant as principal consecrator
- Alberto Gori: 27 December 1949
- Sebastian Vayalil: 9 November 1950
- Diego Venini: 4 February 1951
- Hailé Mariam Cahsai: 1 May 1951
- Ghebre Jesus Jacob: 1 May 1951
- Paolo Bertoli: 11 May 1952
- Pietro Sfair: 24 May 1953
- Raffaele Forni: 13 September 1953
- Joseph Parecattil: 30 November 1953
- Giovanni Battista Montini: 12 December 1954

== See also ==
- Cardinal electors in Papal conclave, 1939
- Cardinal electors in Papal conclave, 1958
- Cardinal electors in Papal conclave, 1963

Catholic Church titles
Preceded by Francesco Marchetti-Selvaggiani	Dean of the College of Cardinals; 13 January 1951 – 21 February 1972	Succeeded by Amleto Giovanni Cicognani
Preceded by Giovanni Mercati	Archivist of the Holy Roman Church; 14 September 1957 – 27 March 1971	Succeeded by Antonio Samore
Preceded by Nicola Canali	Grand Master of the Equestrian Order of the Holy Sepulchre of Jerusalem; 19 August 1960 – 21 February 1972	Succeeded by Maximilien de Furstenberg
