= Apostolic Signatura =

Highest judicial authority within the Catholic Church aside from the pope

The Supreme Tribunal of the Apostolic Signatura (Latin: Supremum Tribunal Signaturae Apostolicae) is the highest judicial authority in the Catholic Church (apart from the Pope himself, who as supreme ecclesiastical judge is the final point of appeal on any ecclesiastical matter). In addition, it oversees the administration of justice in the church and certain of its members have judicial functions in regard to the Vatican City State.

Since 8 November 2014, the prefect of the tribunal has been Cardinal Dominique Mamberti. Its secretary since 26 January 2022 has been Andrea Ripa.

The tribunal is housed in the Italian Renaissance-era Palazzo della Cancelleria in Rome, Italy, which is also the headquarters and meeting place of the Catholic Church's two other major tribunals: the Sacred Roman Rota (which is normally the final appellate tribunal of the church in most cases, especially those regarding marriage nullification and clerical trials and disciplinary procedures), and the Apostolic Penitentiary (which is a tribunal of mercy concerning the forgiveness of sins reserved to the Holy See).

== Field of competence ==
The Signatura's competence covers:

1. complaints of nullity and petitions for total reinstatement against sentences of the Roman Rota;
2. recourses, in cases concerning the status of persons, when the Roman Rota has denied a new examination of the case;
3. exceptions of suspicion and other proceedings against judges of the Roman Rota arising from the exercise of their functions;
4. conflicts of competence between tribunals which are not subject to the same appellate tribunal.

Apart from these judicial matters, the Signatura has the competence as an administrative tribunal to deal with controversies over administrative decisions made by or approved by dicasteries (departments) of the Roman Curia if it is contended that the decision violated some law, either in the decision-making process or in the procedure used. It can also deal with administrative controversies referred to it by the pope or by departments of the curia, and with conflicts of competence between the departments.

A third field of competence for the Signatura is that of overseeing all the tribunals of the Catholic Church, with power to extend the competence (jurisdiction) of tribunals, grant dispensations from procedural laws, establish inter diocesan tribunals, and discipline canonical advocates.

The Apostolic Signatura is also the final court of cassation in the civil legal system of Vatican City State. According to Vatican City State Law CCCLI issued on 16 March 2020, its competence includes appeals concerning legal procedure and judicial competence. According to a 2008 law issued by Pope Benedict XVI, the civil legal system of Vatican City State recognizes canon law as its first source of norms and first principle of interpretation. Pope Francis has stated that principles of canon law are essential to the interpretation and application of the laws of Vatican City State.

== History ==
In the thirteenth century the Popes made use of "referendarii" to investigate and prepare the signing — hence the name signatura — of petitions and other cases presented to the Holy See. Pope Eugene IV entrusted these referendaries with authority to sign certain petitions and thereby established a permanent office for this purpose. Under Popes Alexander VI, Sixtus IV and Julius II this office was divided into two, the Signatura gratiae for examining petitions for favours, and the Signatura iustitiae for contentious cases. The honourable office of referendary came to be conferred frequently as a merely honorary title, but Pope Sixtus V put a limit on their number, and Pope Alexander VII combined the limited number of voting referendaries into a college, assisted by the simple referendaries, who had only a consultative position. The Signatura gratiae gradually lost its functions to other bodies, and the growth of the work of the Roman Rota, the foundation of the Congregations of Cardinals resulted in the Signatura iustitiae becoming mainly a Supreme Court of the Papal States.

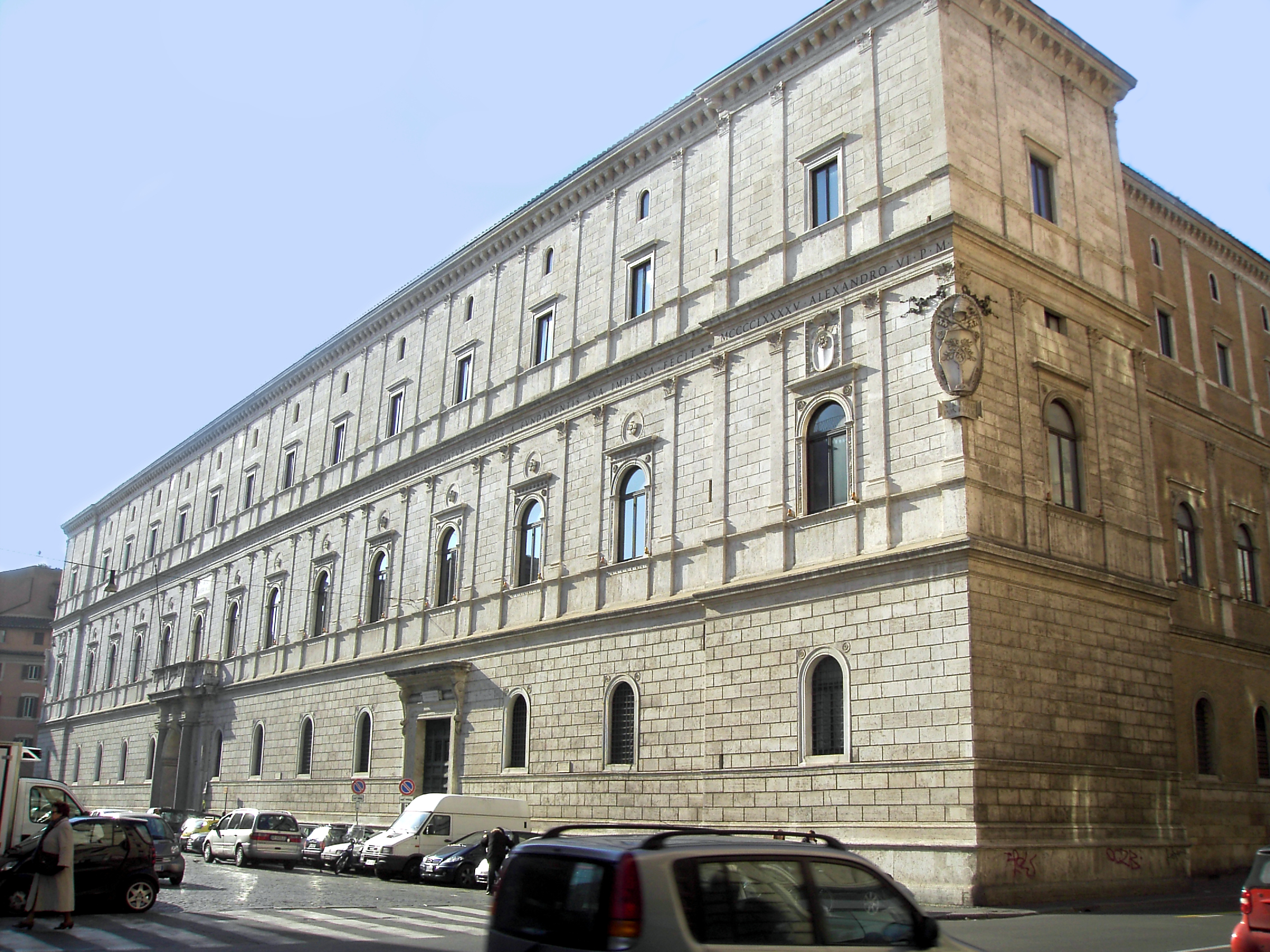
Palazzo Riario o Cancelleria nuova 1628.

On 29 June 1908, Pope Pius X reestablished a single Apostolic Signatura consisting of six cardinals, one of whom acted as its prefect. On 28 June 1915, Pope Benedict XV reconstituted the college of the voting referendaries and simple referendaries with consultative functions and the 1917 Code of Canon Law removed the limitation of the number of cardinal members of this Supreme Tribunal.

The present competence of the Apostolic Signatura is that laid down in the apostolic constitution Pastor Bonus of 28 June 1988.

== Relationship to Supreme Court of Vatican City ==
On 16 March 2020, Pope Francis issued a new Vatican City civil law which makes the Apostolic Signatura itself the final court of cassation for Vatican City State and provides for greater independence of judicial bodies and magistrates dependent on the Pope. It also specifies the requirements for the appointment of judges and it simplifies the judicial system while increasing the staff of the court. Prior to that, the cardinal prefect of the Apostolic Signatura had served ex officio as the President of the Supreme Court of Vatican City (Corte di Cassazione). The two other members of the Supreme Court were also cardinals of the Apostolic Signatura and were chosen by the cardinal prefect on a yearly basis.

== Prefects ==
- Lorenzo Campeggio (1 December 1519 - 19 July 1539)
- Niccolò Ardinghelli (1 May 1545 - 23 August 1547)
- Giovanni Angelo Medici (21 July 1550 - September 1557)
- Antonio Trivulzio, iuniore (16 October 1557 - 25 June 1559)
- Ludovico Simonetta (8 June 1563 - 30 April 1568)
- Gianpaolo Della Chiesa (3 May 1568 - 11 January 1575)
- Alessandro Sforza di Santa Fiora (12 January 1575 - 16 May 1581)
- Alessandro Riario (16 May 1581 - 18 July 1585)
- Giovanni Battista Castrucci (18 July 1585 - 19 July 1591)
- Paolo Emilio Sfondrati (19 July 1591 - 23 December 1599)
- Cinzio Passeri Aldobrandini (23 December 1599 - 1 January 1610)
- Maffeo Barberini (8 January 1610 - 1623)
- Francesco Barberini (13 October 1623 - 18 March 1628)
- Antonio Barberini (18 March 1628 - December 1632)
- Berlinghiero Gessi (2 November 1633 - 6 April 1639)
- Giulio Cesare Sacchetti (22 June 1640 - 10 October 1645)
- Camillo Francesco Maria Pamphili (10 October 1645 - 21 January 1647)
- Benedetto Odescalchi (22 January 1647 - 4 April 1650)
- Flavio Chigi (28 July 1661 - 29 November 1661)
- Giacomo Rospigliosi (20 December 1667 - 2 February 1684)
- Benedetto Pamphili (23 March 1685 - 23 August 1693)
- Fulvio Astalli (24 September 1693 - 16 May 1696)
- Giovanni Giacomo Cavallerini (16 May 1696 - 18 February 1699)
- Fabrizio Spada (4 December 1700 - 15 June 1717)
- Bernardino Scotti (26 November 1718 - 1720)
- Lorenzo Corsini (22 November 1720 - 12 July 1730)
- Alamanno Salviati (27 July 1730 - 24 February 1733)
- Neri Maria Corsini (2 March 1733 - 6 December 1770)
- Andrea Corsini (1770 - 18 January 1795)
- Leonardo Antonelli (27 February 1795 - 26 December 1801)
  - Ercole Consalvi (26 December 1801 - 6 September 1805) (pro-prefect)
- Ercole Consalvi (6 September 1805 - 10 May 1817)
- Antonio Dugnani (16 May 1817 - 17 October 1818)
- Diego Innico Caracciolo di Martina (14 December 1818 - 24 January 1820)
- Giovanni Battista Quarantotti (10 May - 15 September 1820)
- Pietro Francesco Galleffi (20 December 1820 - 15 January 1825)
- Giuseppe Spina (15 January 1825 - 13 November 1828)
- Giovanni Francesco Falzacappa (7 January 1829 - 18 November 1840)
- Antonio Pallotta (1833 - 19 July 1834)
- Luigi Bottiglia Savoulx (27 November 1834 - 14 September 1836)
- Francesco Tiberi Contigliano (22 February 1837 - 28 October 1839)
- Antonio Domenico Gamberini (22 December 1840 - 25 April 1841)
- Mario Mattei (4 July 1854 - 3 February 1858)
- Pietro Marini (3 February 1858 - 19 August 1863)
- Camillo Di Pietro (29 August 1863 - 1867)
- Carlo Sacconi (20 December 1867 - 2 June 1877)
- Teodolfo Mertel (2 June 1877 - 19 June 1879)
- Carlo Luigi Morichini (15 July 1878 - 26 April 1879)
- Luigi Serafini (13 May 1884 - 31 July 1885)
- Isidoro Verga (31 July 1885 - 12 November 1888)
- Luigi Pallotti (20 February 1889 - 31 July 1890)
- Vincenzo Vannutelli (20 October 1908 – 15 December 1914)
- Michele Lega (15 December 1914 – 20 March 1920)
- Augusto Silj (20 March 1920 – 26 February 1926)
- Francesco Ragonesi (9 March 1926 – 14 September 1931)
- Bonaventura Cerretti (12 October 1931 – 8 May 1933)
- Enrico Gasparri (18 May 1933 – 20 May 1946)
- Massimo Massimi (29 May 1946 – 6 March 1954)
- Giuseppe Bruno (20 March 1954 – 10 November 1954)
- Gaetano Cicognani (18 November 1954 – 5 February 1962)
- Francesco Roberti (14 November 1959 – 24 March 1969)
- Dino Staffa (7 April 1967 – 7 August 1977)
- Pericle Felici (13 September 1977 – 22 March 1982)
- Aurelio Sabattani (17 May 1982 – 1 July 1988)
- Achille Silvestrini (1 July 1988 – 24 May 1991)
- Gilberto Agustoni (2 April 1992 – 5 October 1998)
- Zenon Grocholewski (5 October 1998 – 15 November 1999)
- Mario Francesco Pompedda (15 November 1999 – 27 May 2004)
- Agostino Vallini (27 May 2004 – 27 June 2008)
- Raymond Leo Burke (27 June 2008 – 8 November 2014)
- Dominique Mamberti (8 November 2014 – present)
