= Benedetto Aloisi Masella =

Italian cardinal (1879–1970)

His Eminence Benedetto Aloisi Masella
- Cardinal-Bishop of Palestrina
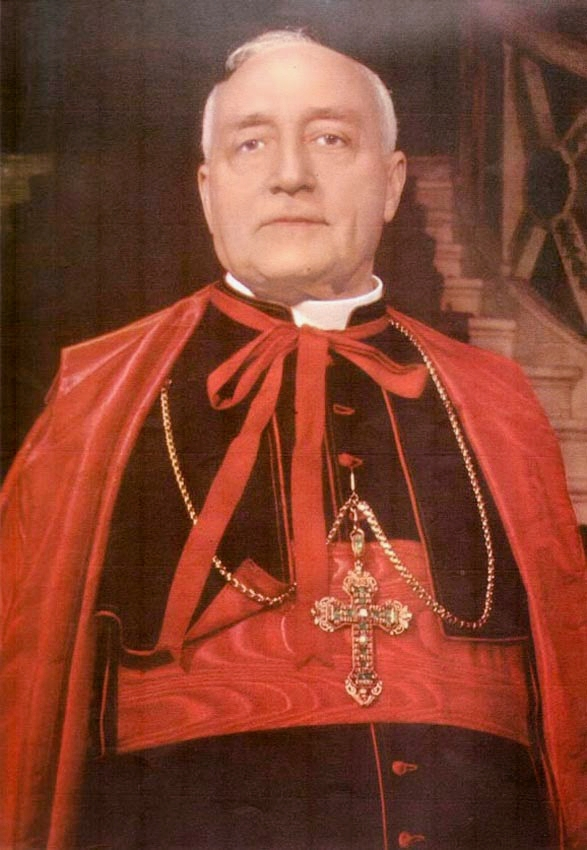
- Installed: 21 June 1948
- Term ended: 30 September 1970
- Predecessor: Carlo Salotti
- Successor: Carlo Confalonieri
- Other posts: Archpriest of the Basilica of St. John Lateran (1954–1970; Chamberlain of the Holy Roman Church of Apostolic Camera (1958–1970)
- Previous posts: Apostolic Nuncio to Chile (1919–1927); Titular Archbishop of Cesarea in Maurentania (1919–1946); Apostolic Nuncio to Brazil (1927–1946); Cardinal-Priest of Santa Maria in Vallicella (1946–1948); Prefect of the Sacred Congregation for the Discipline of the Sacraments (1954–1968); Camerlengo of the Holy Roman Church (1962–1968)

Orders
- Ordination: 1 June 1902 by Gaetano Aloisi Masella
- Consecration: 21 December 1919 by Pietro Gasparri
- Created cardinal: 18 February 1946 by Pope Pius XII
- Rank: Cardinal-Priest (1946–1948); Cardinal-Bishop (1948–1970)

Personal details
- Born: Benedetto Aloisi Masella; 29 June 1879 Pontecorvo, Kingdom of Italy
- Died: 30 September 1970 (aged 91) Rome, Italy
- Buried: Pontecorvo
- Denomination: Catholicism
- Coat of arms

Styles of Benedetto Aloisi Masella
- Reference style: His Eminence
- Spoken style: Your Eminence
- Religious style: Monsignor
- Informal style: Cardinal

Benedetto Aloisi Masella (29 June 1879 – 30 September 1970) was an Italian cardinal of the Roman Catholic Church who served as prefect of the Discipline of the Sacraments from 1954 to 1968, and as chamberlain of the Roman Church (or camerlengo) from 1958 until his death. Aloisi Masella was elevated to the cardinalate in 1946 by Pope Pius XII, whom he designated to canonically crown Our Lady of Fatima.

== Biography ==
Coat of arms of Cardinal Aloisi Masella during the 1958 and 1963 vacancy

Born in Pontecorvo, Benedetto Aloisi Masella attended the seminary in Ferentino before going to Rome, where he studied at the Pontifical Gregorian University, Pontifical Roman Athenaeum S. Apollinare, and the Pontifical Ecclesiastical Academy. He was ordained to the priesthood on 1 June 1902 and then served as private secretary to his uncle, Cardinal Gaetano Aloisi Masella, the pro-datary of the pope.

Entering the Roman Curia, in the Secretariat of State, in 1906, Aloisi Masella then began work for the Nunciature to Portugal (secretary, 1908–1910; chargé d'affaires, 1910–1919). He was raised to the rank of privy chamberlain of his holiness on 25 December 1914, domestic prelate of his holiness on 29 September 1917, and nuncio to Chile on 20 November 1919.

On 15 December 1919, he was appointed Titular Archbishop of Caesarea in Palaestina by Pope Benedict XV. Aloisi Masella received his episcopal consecration on the following 21 December from Cardinal Pietro Gasparri, with Archbishop Sebastião Leite de Vasconcellos and Bishop Antonio Maria Iannotta serving as co-consecrators. He was later named Apostolic Nuncio to Brazil on 26 April 1927.

Aloisi Masella was created Cardinal-Priest of Santa Maria in Vallicella by Pope Pius XII in the consistory of 18 February 1946. He was promoted to Cardinal Bishop of Palestrina on 21 June 1948. On 27 October 1954, Pius XII appointed him archpriest of the Basilica of St. John Lateran and prefect of the Sacred Congregation for the Discipline of the Sacraments. He was chosen chamberlain of the Roman Church (or camerlengo) on 9 October 1958 by the Curial cardinals, as the late Pius XII had yet to appoint anyone to that post, for the conclave of that same year.

From 1962 to 1965, he attended the Second Vatican Council.

He voted in the 1963 conclave that elected Pope Paul VI. Aloisi Masella resigned as prefect of the Discipline of the Sacraments on 11 January 1968.

He died from kidney disease in Rome at age 91, as the oldest member of the College of Cardinals. He was buried in the cathedral of his native Pontecorvo.

== Books ==
- Lentz, Harris M. (2009). Popes and Cardinals of the 20th Century: A Biographical Dictionary. Jefferson NC USA: McFarland. p. 10. ISBN 978-1-4766-2155-5.

Catholic Church titles
Preceded by Domenico Jorio	Prefect of the Congregation for the Discipline of the Sacraments; 1954–1968	Succeeded by Francis James Brennan
Preceded by Lorenzo Lauri	Camerlengo; 1958–1970	Succeeded by Jean-Marie Villot
Records
Preceded by Giuseppe Pizzardo	Oldest living Member of the Sacred College; 1 August 1970 – 30 September 1970	Succeeded by Paolo Giobbe
