= Giuseppe Pizzardo =

Italian cardinal

His Eminence Giuseppe Pizzardo
- Prefect of the Congregation of Seminaries and Universities
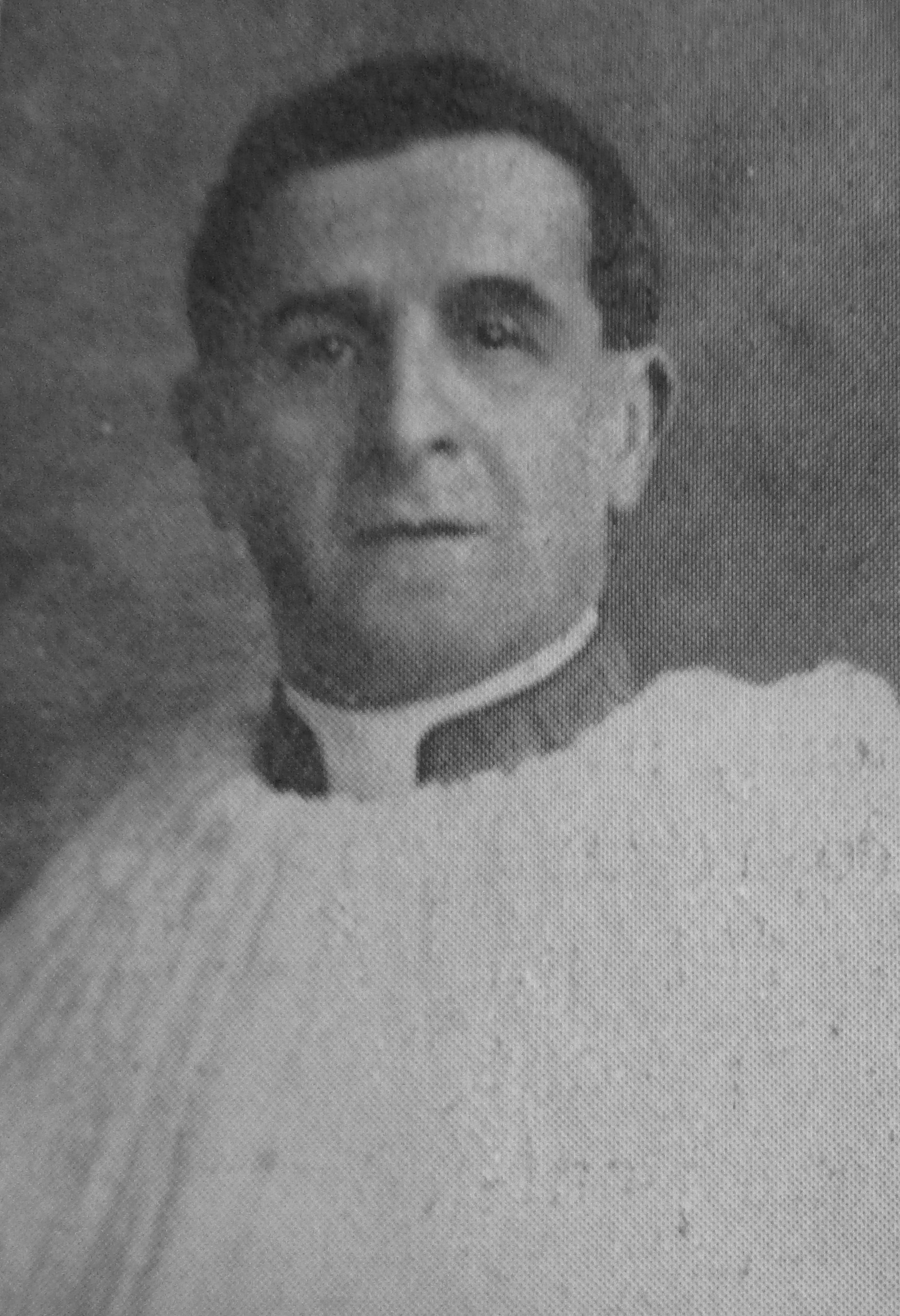
- Appointed: 14 March 1939
- Term ended: 13 January 1968
- Predecessor: Gaetano Bisleti
- Successor: Gabriel-Marie Garrone
- Other post: Cardinal-Bishop of Albano
- Previous posts: Secretary of the Roman Curia (1929–1930); Titular Archbishop of Cyrrhus (1930); President of the Roman Curia (1930–1939); Titular Archbishop of Nicaea (1930–1937); Cardinal-Priest of Santa Maria in Via Lata (1937–1948); Secretary of the Congregation of the Holy Office (1951–1959)

Orders
- Ordination: 19 September 1903
- Consecration: 27 April 1930 by Eugenio Maria Giuseppe Giovanni Pacelli
- Created cardinal: 13 December 1937 by Pope Pius XI
- Rank: Cardinal-bishop

Personal details
- Born: 13 July 1877 Savona, Italy
- Died: 1 August 1970 (aged 93)
- Denomination: Roman Catholic

Styles of Giuseppe Pizzardo
- Reference style: His Eminence
- Spoken style: Your Eminence
- Informal style: Cardinal
- See: Albano (suburbicarian)

Giuseppe Pizzardo (13 July 1877 – 1 August 1970) was an Italian cardinal of the Catholic Church who served as prefect of the Congregation for Seminaries and Universities from 1939 to 1968, and secretary of the Holy Office from 1951 to 1959. Pizzardo was elevated to the cardinalate in 1937.

== Biography ==
Born in Savona, Pizzardo studied at the Pontifical Gregorian University, Pontifical Roman Athenaeum Saint Apollinare, and the Pontifical Ecclesiastical Academy before being ordained a priest on 19 September 1903.

From 1908 to 1909, he did pastoral work in Rome and served in the Vatican Secretariat of State. Pizzardo was raised to the rank of monsignor, and appointed secretary of the nunciature to Bavaria, on 7 June 1909. In the Congregation for Extraordinary Ecclesiastical Affairs, he was appointed: undersecretary (1920), substitute (1921), and secretary (1929). He became an apostolic protonotary on 11 January 1927.

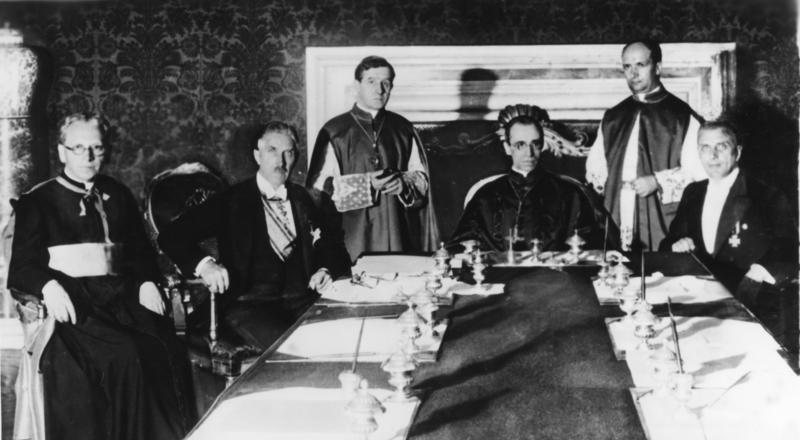
The signing of the Reichskonkordat on 20 July 1933 in Rome. From left to right: Monsignor Ludwig Kaas, German Vice-Chancellor Franz von Papen, Archbishop Pizzardo, Cardinal Secretary of State Eugenio Pacelli, Alfredo Ottaviani, and Reich Minister Rudolf Buttmann.

Pope Pius XI appointed him Titular Archbishop of Cyrrhus on 28 March 1930, and on the following 22 April, Titular Archbishop of Nicaea. Pizzardo received his episcopal consecration on 27 April of that same year from Eugenio Cardinal Pacelli, with Archbishop Giuseppe Palica and Francesco Marchetti-Selvaggiani serving as co-consecrators.

He was named president of the Pontifical Commission for Russia on 21 December 1934, and an assistant at the papal throne on 19 January 1936. He was created Cardinal-Priest of Santa Maria in Via Lata by Pius XI in the consistory of 13 December 1937. Pizzardo was prefect of the Congregation for Seminaries and Universities from 14 March 1939 until his resignation on 13 January 1968. He was Cardinal-Bishop of Albano from 21 June 1948.

He was named secretary of the Holy Office (the equivalent of what is now called prefect of the Dicastery for the Doctrine of the Faith) on 16 February 1951 by Pope Pius XII, for whom he had worked many years in the Secretariat of State. He resigned on 12 October 1959. He attended the Second Vatican Council.

Archives opened to the public in 2024 show Pizzardo defended Marcial Maciel, a priest known to the Vatican as a drug addict and sexual abuser, from a measure being written by Giovanni Battista Scapinelli. Memos show the measure originally required Maciel to cease any contact with his students or be suspended a divinis. The measure was edited to remove the prohibition against contact with seminarians, and later documents say further actions against Maciel could not proceed due to "recommendations and interventions by high-ranking personalities."

He was known as an early patron and mentor of Giovanni Battista Montini, the future Pope Paul VI. Though they became more distant as Montini rose in power, Pope Paul's final trip away from his summer residence before his death in August 1978 was to a memorial Mass on the anniversary of Pizzardo's death.

Pizzardo was considered to be highly conservative. He condemned Graham Greene's 1940 novel The Power and the Glory, opposed the French worker-priest movement, and Catholic participation in the Protestant Cold War group, Moral Re-Armament.

== Other roles ==
He was also involved in Azione Cattolica, serving on its Central Committee as ecclesiastical assistant in 1923 and president in 1938.

Appointed sub-dean of the College of Cardinals on 29 March 1965, Cardinal Pizzardo was one of the cardinal electors in the conclaves of 1939, 1958, and 1963.

Catholic Church titles
Preceded by Francesco Marchetti-Selvaggiani	Secretary of the Supreme Sacred Congregation of the Holy Office; 16 February 1951 – 12 October 1959	Succeeded by Alfredo Ottaviani
Records
Preceded by Augusto da Silva	Oldest living Member of the Sacred College; 14 August 1968 – 1 August 1970	Succeeded by Benedetto Aloisi Masella
