= 1963 conclave =

Election of Catholic Pope Paul VI

Papal conclave June 1963

Dates and location
- 19–21 June 1963; Sistine Chapel, Apostolic Palace, Vatican City

Key officials
- Dean: Eugène Tisserant
- Sub-dean: Clemente Micara
- Camerlengo: Benedetto Aloisi Masella
- Protopriest: Manuel Cerejeira
- Protodeacon: Alfredo Ottaviani
- Secretary: Francesco Carpino

Election
- Electors: 80 (list)
- Candidates: See papabili
- Ballots: 6

Elected pope
- Giovanni Montini; Name taken: Paul VI
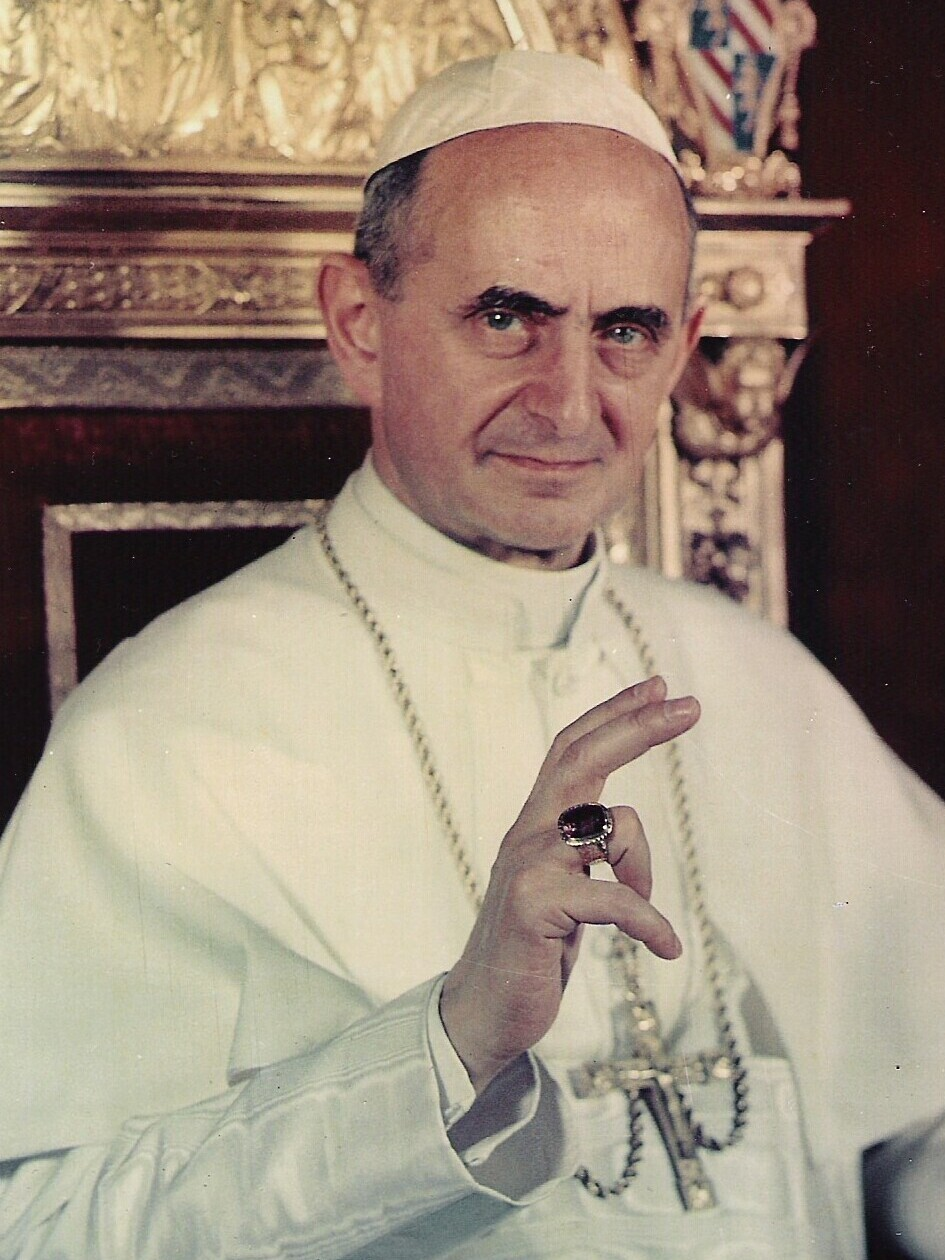

A conclave was held from 19 to 21 June 1963 to elect a new pope to succeed John XXIII, who had died on 3 June 1963. It was the last conclave before the introduction of the current 80-year-old age limit for cardinal electors in 1970, and of the 82 members of the College of Cardinals, all but two attended. On the sixth ballot, the conclave elected Cardinal Giovanni Montini, the archbishop of Milan. After accepting his election, he took the name Paul VI. His coronation on 30 June 1963 was the latest papal coronation to date.

== Papabili ==
John XXIII's death left the future of the Second Vatican Council in the balance, since the election of an anti-Council pope could have severely curbed the Council's role. The leading papabile candidates were Giovanni Montini of Milan, who had not been a cardinal at the previous conclave and was supportive of the reforms proposed at the Council; Giacomo Lercaro of Bologna, who was considered a liberal, close to John XXIII; and Giuseppe Siri of Genoa, papabile in 1958 and critical of these reforms. Gregorio Pietro Agagianian, the former Armenian Catholic Patriarch of Cilicia was also thought to be papabile. Reportedly, John XXIII had sent oblique signals indicating that he thought Montini would make a fine pope.

== Participants ==
The 1963 papal conclave, which met from 19 to 21 June, at the Sistine Chapel in Vatican City, was the largest yet assembled. There were 82 cardinal electors eligible to participate. The only two who did not were Cardinal József Mindszenty, who refused to leave the U.S. Legation in Budapest where he had lived since 1956 unless the Hungarian government met his demands for religious freedom in Hungary, and Cardinal Carlos María de la Torre of Quito, Ecuador, who was 89 years old and could not make the journey because he had suffered a stroke the previous December and was bedridden with thrombosis. Of the eighty cardinals who did participate, eight had been elevated by Pope Pius XI, twenty-seven by Pius XII, and the other 45 by John XXIII. Each cardinal elector was allowed one aide. They came from 29 countries, compared to 51 from 21 countries in the conclave of 1958 and 59 from 16 countries in 1939. The Italians were outnumbered 51 to 29.

== Balloting ==
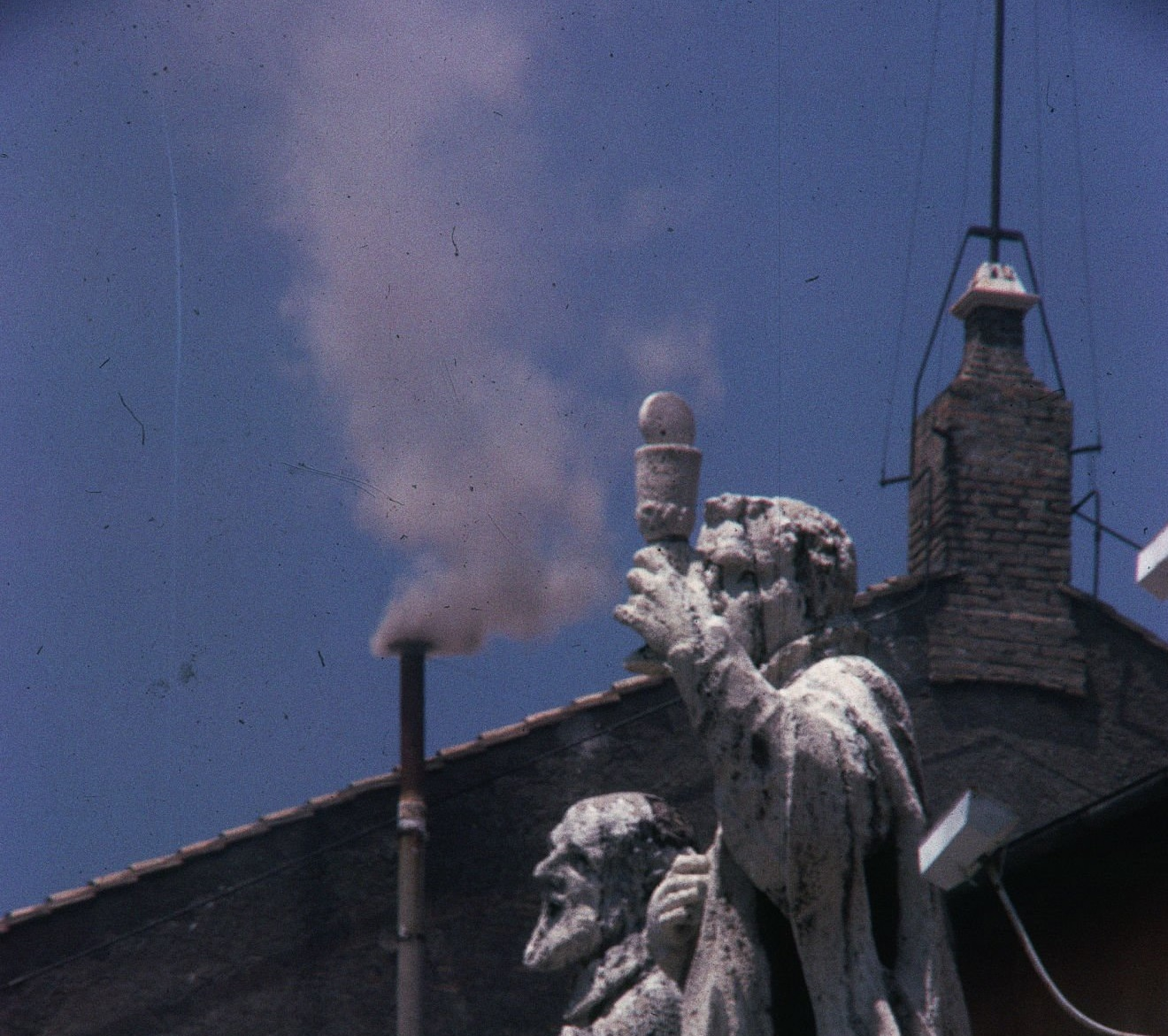
White smoke from the Sistine Chapel following Paul VI's election

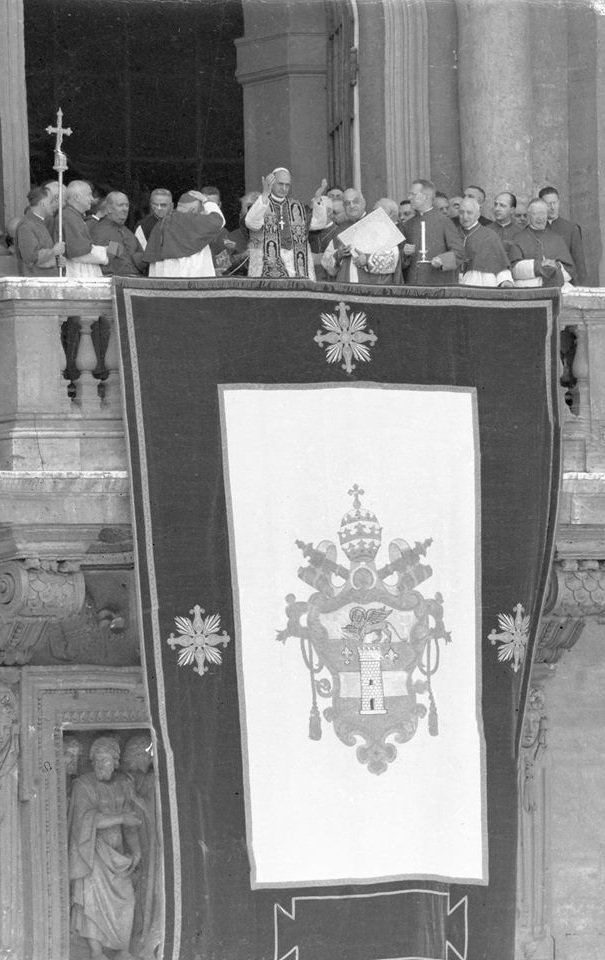
Pope Paul VI appearing on the balcony of St. Peter's Basilica following his election on 21 June 1963

Under the latest rules, election required the votes of two-thirds of those voting, in this case 53. (two-thirds rounded when not evenly divisible by 3). No ballots were taken on the first day, then two each morning and two each afternoon. Because there had been confusion at the last conclave in 1958 over the color of the smoke used to indicate whether a pope had been elected, the smoke would be supplemented with electric lights.

The results of the first four ballots were signaled with black smoke on 20 June at 11:54 am and 5:47 pm. Each time, the smoke appeared white at first.

Some reform-minded cardinals initially voted for Leo Joseph Suenens of Mechelen-Brussels and Franz König of Vienna to make the point that the pope does not have to be Italian. Other reports said that conservative cardinals attempted to block Montini's election in the early balloting. Due to the apparent deadlock, Cardinal Montini proposed to withdraw himself from being considered but was silenced by Giovanni Urbani, the Patriarch of Venice. Another cardinal, Gustavo Testa, an old friend of John XXIII, lost his temper in the Chapel and demanded that the intransigents stop impeding Montini's path.

By the fourth ballot on 20 June, according to Time magazine, Montini needed only four more votes to obtain the required number of votes. He was elected on the fifth ballot on the morning of 21 June. When asked by Eugène Tisserant whether he accepted his election, Montini replied, "Accepto, in nomine Domini" ("I accept, in the name of the Lord") and chose the name Paul VI.

At 11:22 am, white smoke rose from the chimney of the Sistine Chapel, signifying the election of a new pope. Alfredo Ottaviani, in his capacity as the senior cardinal deacon, announced Montini's election in Latin. Before Ottaviani had even finished saying Montini's name, the crowd beneath the balcony of St. Peter's Basilica erupted into applause.

Pope Paul VI appeared on the balcony shortly afterwards to give his first blessing. On this occasion, Paul VI chose not to give the traditional Urbi et Orbi blessing but instead imparted the shorter episcopal blessing as his first apostolic blessing.

== See also ==
Cardinal electors by region
| Region | Number |
|---|---|
| Italy | 29 |
| Rest of Europe | 26 |
| North America | 7 |
| South America | 11 |
| Asia | 5 |
| Oceania | 1 |
| Africa | 1 |
| Total | 80 |

- Cardinal electors in the 1963 papal conclave
