= Cardinals created by Pius XII =

Catholic appointments from 1946 to 1953

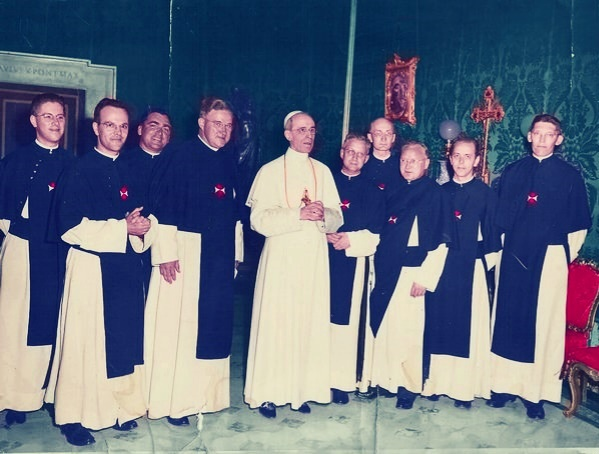
Pope Pius XII (1876–1958), surrounded by Crosier members from Uden, Netherlands during an audience in Vatican City

Pope Pius XII (r. 1939–1958) created 56 cardinals in two consistories. On both occasions Pius tried to bring the membership of the College of Cardinals to 70, the maximum established by Pope Sixtus V in 1586. The death of one cardinal meant his first consistory brought the College to 69 members, but his second consistory, through the prompt addition of another name after a cardinal-designate died, brought the number of cardinals to 70.

Pius was elected in 1939 by a papal conclave in which 62 cardinals participated. The Second World War forced him to wait until 1946 to hold a consistory to create cardinals. He then waited seven years as the membership of the College fell to 46 before holding another consistory in 1953, and it had fallen to 53 when he died five and a half years later without holding another consistory.

Pius's cardinals included Angelo Roncalli, who succeeded him as Pope John XXIII. He created the first native-born Australian cardinal, Norman Gilroy, and the first cardinals from Chile, China, Colombia, Cuba, Ecuador, and India; Teodósio de Gouveia was the first from Mozambique and the first cardinal to reside in Africa in the modern era. Those Pius named from Poland and Yugoslavia did not attend the consistory out of fear their governments would not allow them to return home. Pius was, nonetheless, the first pope since Innocent XIII, who created only three cardinals, to never name a cardinal in pectore.

By creating just four Italians out of 32 cardinals in 1946 and 10 of 24 in 1953, Pius transformed the geographic composition of the College of Cardinals. At the time of the conclave that elected him in 1939, 35 of the 62 cardinals were Italian. At his death in 1958, the Italians were 17 of 53. Over the same timespan, the number of non-Europeans grew from seven to 18. (Note: This tabulation counts Teodósio de Gouveia of Mozambique as an African, though he was born in Portugal.)

== Initial plans ==
Plans for a first consistory were made by Pius XII in April 1940 – to take place in June – however, this was derailed by Italy's entry into World War II in the month planned for the consistory. In December 1940 and again in May 1941 rumours emerged Pius would hold a secret consistory in the presence only of those cardinals residing in Rome, with many cardinals being reserved in pectore. Again in April 1943 a consistory was proposed for June. This never came to fruition as wartime action moved into Rome around the time the proposed 1943 consistory would have been held. By the time the proposed 1943 consistory was to be held, there were only 47 living cardinals, but once the war moved into Italy Pius became steadfast that he would hold no consistory until the war ended.

== 18 February 1946 ==
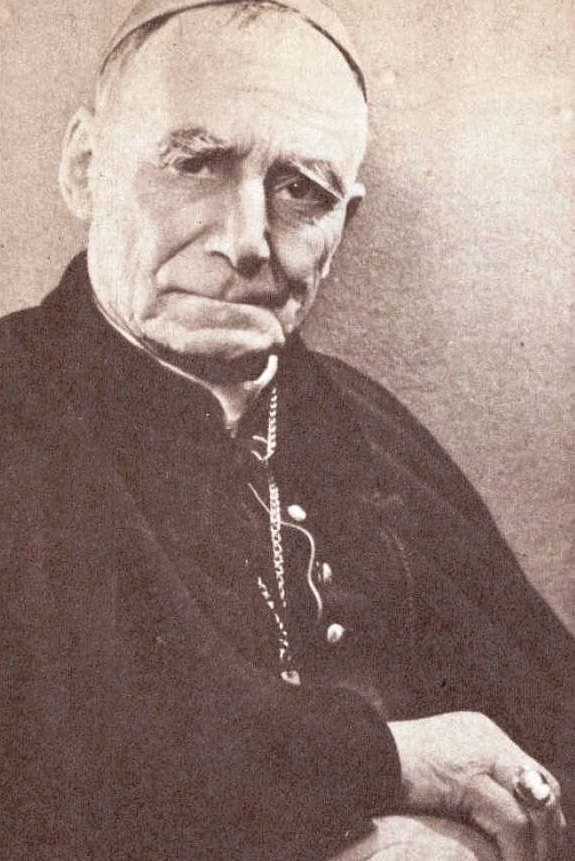
José María Caro (1866–1958)

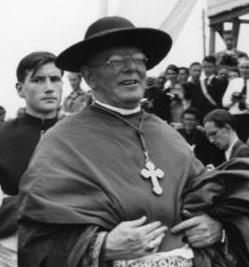
Bernard Griffin (1899–1956)

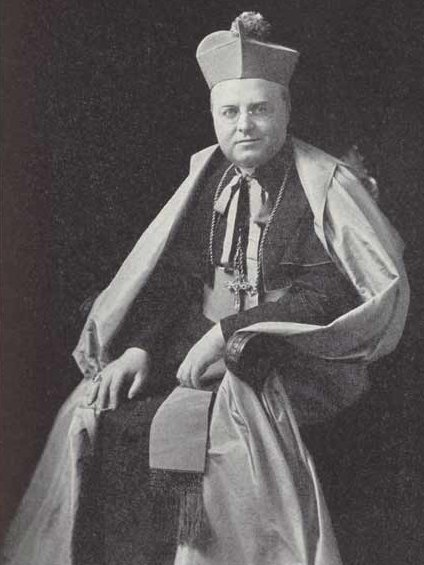
James Charles McGuigan (1894–1974)

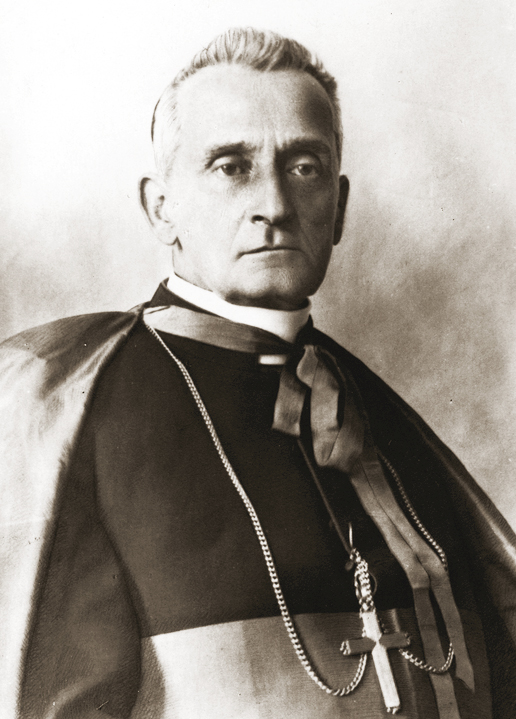
Adam Stefan Sapieha (1867–1951)

On 23 December 1945, Pope Pius XII announced he would create 32 cardinals at a consistory on 18 February 1946. The new cardinals came from 19 countries, with the number in the College of Cardinals from the Western Hemisphere growing from three to fourteen. Countries with their first cardinal included Chile, China, and Cuba; Mozambique got its first cardinal, though he was born in Portugal; Australia gained its first native-born cardinal. Only four were Italian. It was one of the largest groups of cardinals created at one time. (Note: The New York Times mistakenly cites the consistory held by Pope Pius VII in 1801 as the largest. Pius compared it to the 31 created by Pius VII in March 1816, though ten of those names were not announced at the time, and to the 31 created by Pope Leo X in the June 1517 consistory.) Pius discussed the 70-member maximum, noting that it did not control his appointments, but said that he would adhere to it because he was already naming so many new cardinals. (Note: He said: "Undoubtedly the Roman pontiffs who succeeded him [Sixtus V] would not be bound by this provision, if they considered it opportune to increase or diminish the number.... We have considered it all the more fitting not to go beyond the limit set, because there never yet has been created so large a number of Cardinals–thirty-two–in a single consistory.") He said: "we have been anxious that the greatest number of races and peoples should be represented, so that this creation may portray in a living manner the universality of the church." The size of the College had not been as high as 70–the maximum established on 3 December 1586 by Pope Sixtus V–since the eighteenth century.

With this consistory, Italians became a minority in the College of Cardinals. When it was announced they were expected to hold 28 of the 70 places. The death of Cardinal Pietro Boetto on 31 January at the age of 74 changed the outcome of the consistory to 27 Italians out of 69. As a symbolic recognition of the end of World War II, two of the new cardinals, Bernard Griffin from Great Britain and Konrad von Preysing of Germany embraced when they met on 12 February in the Vatican. Agagianian, just 50, became the youngest member of the College, though his patriarch's title gave him precedence ahead of other cardinals created at this consistory. Of the 32, all were made cardinal priests but Bruno, a cardinal deacon.

The large number of new cardinals required moving the ceremony where the pope meets with the new cardinals from the papal apartments to the Hall of Benedictions, and for the public ceremony the papal throne was repositioned from the apse of St. Peter's Basilica to the steps of the Altar of Confession to allow for a larger crowd of spectators. Three of the new cardinals were unable to attend the ceremonies on 18 February: Johannes de Jong and Jules-Géraud Saliège were unable to travel to Rome because of illness, and József Mindszenty was having problems obtaining a visa to travel from Hungary. Mindszenty arrived for the public ceremony on 21 February, but José María Caro and Manuel Arteaga y Betancourt were suffering from influenza. The next day, when the new cardinals received their rings, Juan Guevara was sick as well. Arteaga and Guevara received their insignia in a private ceremony with Pius on 28 February. Anticipating he would never be healthy enough to travel to Rome, de Jong received his biretta in Utrecht on 28 February as well. Finally, Caro and Saliège received their insignia from Pius on 17 May. By then the number of cardinals had fallen to 68 with the death of one of the new cardinals, John J. Glennon, on 9 March.

Name	Title when named cardinal	Country
Grégoire-Pierre Agagianian (1895–1971)	Patriarch of Cilicia of the Armenians	Lebanon
John J. Glennon (1862–1946)	Archbishop of St. Louis	United States
Benedetto Aloisi Masella (1879–1970)	Apostolic Nuncio to Brazil	Italy
Clemente Micara (1879–1965)	Apostolic Nuncio to Belgium and Apostolic Nuncio to Luxembourg	Italy
Adam Stefan Sapieha (1867–1951)	Archbishop of Krakow	Poland
Edward Mooney (1882–1958)	Archbishop of Detroit	United States
Jules-Géraud Saliège (1870–1956)	Archbishop of Toulouse	France
James Charles McGuigan (1894–1974)	Archbishop of Toronto	Canada
Samuel Stritch (1887–1958)	Archbishop of Chicago	United States
Agustín Parrado y García (1872–1946)	Archbishop of Granada	(Francoist Spain) Spain
Clément-Emile Roques (1880–1964)	Archbishop of Rennes	France
Johannes de Jong (1885–1955)	Archbishop of Utrecht	Netherlands
Carlos Carmelo Vasconcellos Motta (1890–1982)	Archbishop of São Paulo	Brazil
Pierre Petit de Julleville (1876–1947)	Archbishop of Rouen	France
Norman Thomas Gilroy (1896–1977)	Archbishop of Sydney	Australia
Francis Spellman (1889–1967)	Archbishop of New York	United States
José María Caro (1866–1958)	Archbishop of Santiago	Chile
Teódosio de Gouveia (1889–1962)	Archbishop of Lourenço Marques	Portugal
Jaime de Barros Câmara (1894–1971)	Archbishop of São Sebastião do Rio de Janeiro	Brazil
Enrique Pla y Deniel (1876–1968)	Archbishop of Toledo	(Francoist Spain) Spain
Manuel Arteaga y Betancourt (1879–1963)	Archbishop of La Habana	(Republic of Cuba (1902–1959)) Cuba
Josef Frings (1887–1978)	Archbishop of Cologne	(Allied-occupied Germany) Germany
Juan Guevara (1882–1954)	Archbishop of Lima	Peru
Bernard Griffin (1899–1956)	Archbishop of Westminster	United Kingdom
Manuel Arce y Ochotorena (1879–1948)	Archbishop of Tarragona	(Francoist Spain) Spain
József Mindszenty (1892–1975)	Archbishop of Esztergom	(Hungarian Republic (1946–49)) Hungary
Ernesto Ruffini (1888–1967)	Archbishop of Palermo	Italy
Konrad von Preysing (1880–1950)	Bishop of Berlin	(Allied-occupied Germany) Germany
Clemens August Graf von Galen (1878–1946)	Bishop of Münster	(Allied-occupied Germany) Germany
Antonio Caggiano (1889–1979)	Bishop of Rosario	Argentina
Thomas Tien Ken-sin (1890–1967)	Apostolic Vicar of Qingdao	(Republic of China (1912–1949)) China
Giuseppe Bruno (1875–1954)	Secretary of the Sacred Congregation of the Council	Italy

== 12 January 1953 ==
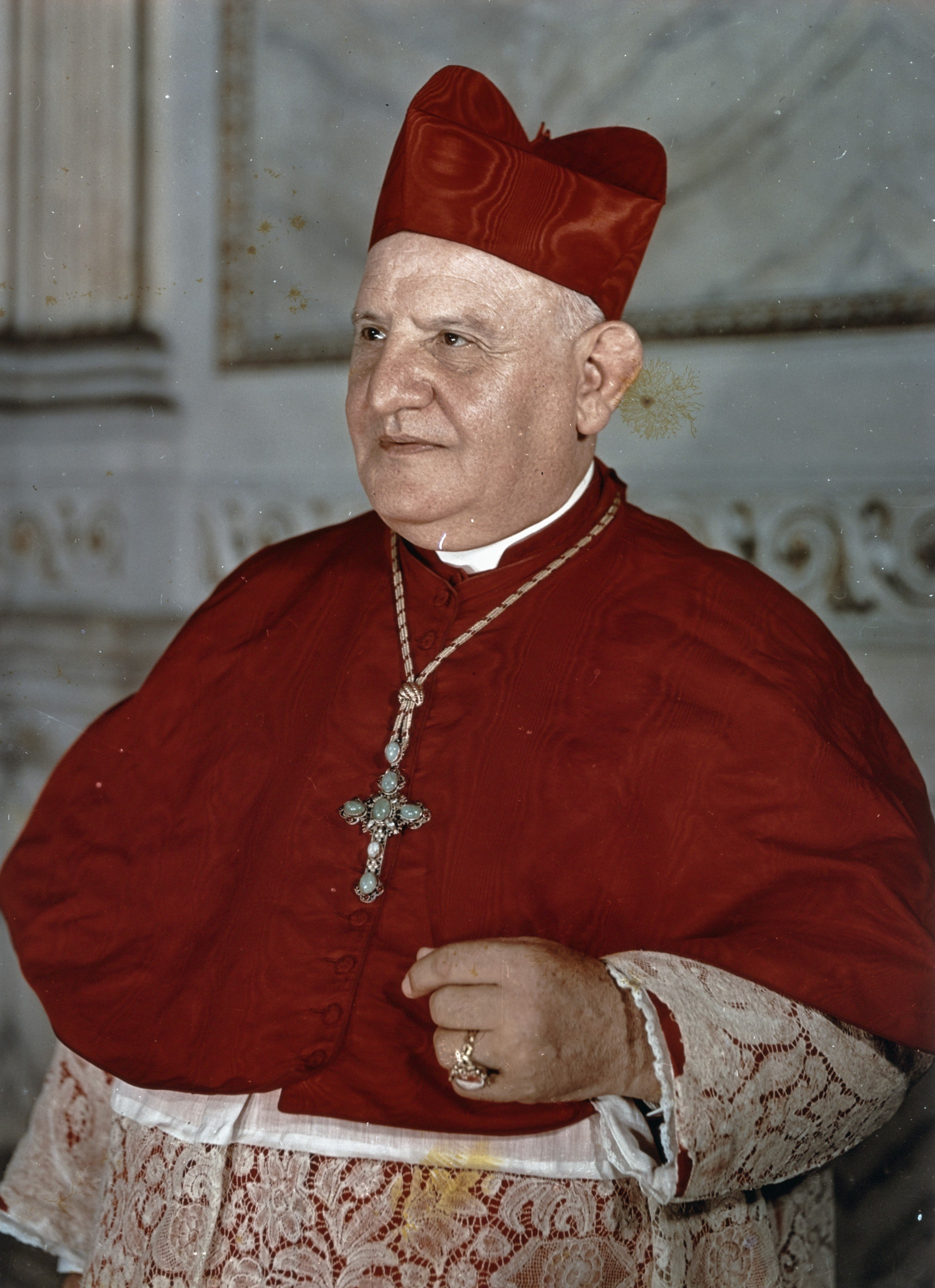
Angelo Giuseppe Roncalli, later elected as Pope John XXIII (1881–1963)

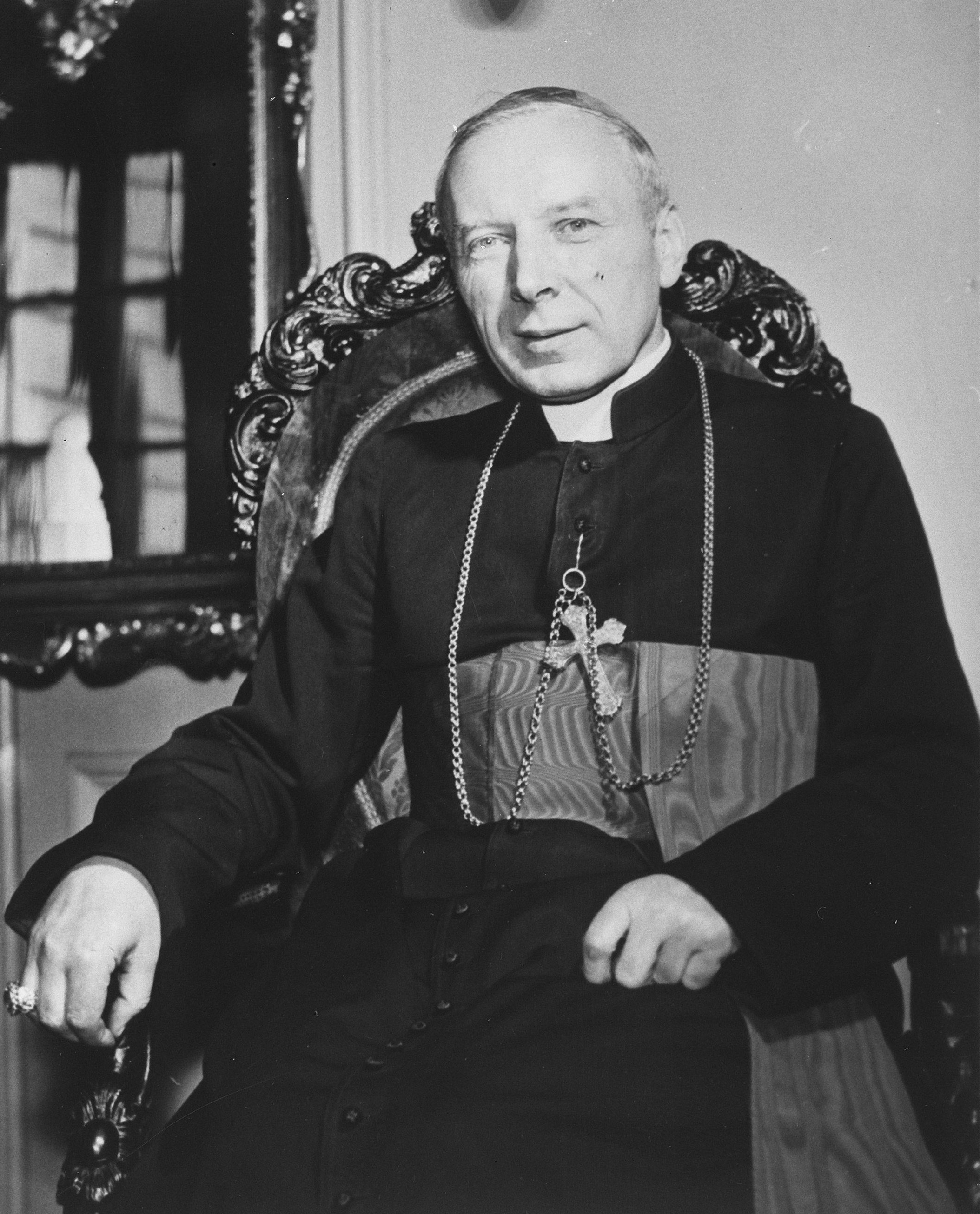
Stefan Wyszyński (1901–1981)

On 29 November 1952, Pope Pius XII announced he would create 24 new cardinals in a consistory on 12 January 1953. Eleven of them were Italian and the membership of the college would reach the maximum of 70, with 27 Italians. Two were thought to be virtual prisoners in their countries, Aloysius Stepinac in Yugoslavia and Stefan Wyszyński in Poland. Those from Ecuador and Colombia were those countries' first cardinals. Stepinac and Wyszyński chose not to travel to Rome, fearing they would not be allowed to reenter their countries. (Note: Wyszyński did not receive his titular church assignment until 1957; Stepinac never received his.) Another new cardinal was Angelo Roncalli, who became Pope John XXIII in 1958.

One of those Pius named, Carlo Agostini, died on 28 December at the age of 64. The next day, the Vatican announced Valerian Gracias would be made a cardinal, the first from India, allowing the College to reach its maximum membership of 70, with 26 of them Italian.

Reviving a custom that had been interrupted, Pius announced that he was granting the request of Catholic heads of state in four countries to serve as his legate in delivering the cardinal's biretta to six of them, either residential bishops in or papal nuncios to their country: Generalissimo Francisco Franco of Spain for Gaetano Cicognani, Benjamín de Arriba y Castro, and Fernando Quiroga y Palacios; the socialist President of France Vincent Auriol for Angelo Roncalli; the President of Portugal for Pietro Ciriaci; and President Luigi Einaudi of Italy for Francesco Borgongini Duca. At the consistory Pius sharply criticized Yugoslavia and in milder language Poland and said the honor he was showing to two of their citizens was meant to honor their countries as well.

After creating 23 cardinals of the order of cardinal priests and one cardinal deacon (Ottaviani) on 12 January 1953, Pope Pius three days later gave seventeen of them their red galeri, sixteen their titular church assignments, and Ottaviani his deaconry. (Note: Five of those who received their galeri from a head of state were absent, but Duca was able to be present. The other five received their galeri and titular churches from Pope Pius on 29 October 1953.)

When Pius died five years later, his failure to make Giovanni Montini a cardinal at this consistory was much discussed. Though still in his fifties, Montini appeared to be groomed as Pius's successor and had long been his right hand at the Secretariat of State. Pius appointed him archbishop of Milan in 1954, and Montini even received some votes at the 1958 conclave, where his prospects would have been very good had he been a cardinal. Instead, he had to wait for the next conclave in 1963 to be elected Pope Paul VI.

Name	Title when named cardinal	Country
Celso Benigno Luigi Costantini (1876–1958)	Secretary of the Sacred Congregation of the Propagation of the Faith	Italy
Augusto da Silva (1876–1968)	Archbishop of São Salvador da Bahia	Brazil
Gaetano Cicognani (1881–1962)	Apostolic Nuncio to Spain	Italy
Angelo Giuseppe Roncalli (1881–1963) (Note: Elected as Pope John XXIII (1958–1963))	Apostolic Nuncio to France	Italy
Valerio Valeri (1883–1963)	Assessor of Sacred Congregation for the Oriental Churches	Italy
Pietro Ciriaci (1885–1966)	Apostolic Nuncio to Portugal	Italy
Francesco Borgongini Duca (1884–1954)	Apostolic Nuncio to Italy	Italy
Maurice Feltin (1883–1975)	Archbishop of Paris	France
Marcello Mimmi (1882–1961)	Archbishop of Napoli	Italy
Carlos María de la Torre (1873–1968)	Archbishop of Quito	Ecuador
Aloysius Stepinac (1898–1960)	Archbishop of Zagreb	Yugoslavia
Georges-François-Xavier-Marie Grente (1872–1959)	Archbishop-Bishop of Le Mans	France
Giuseppe Siri (1906–1989)	Archbishop of Genoa	Italy
John D'Alton (1882–1963)	Archbishop of Armagh	Ireland
James McIntyre (1886–1979)	Archbishop of Los Angeles	United States
Giacomo Lercaro (1891–1976)	Archbishop of Bologna	Italy
Stefan Wyszyński (1901–1981)	Archbishop of Warsaw and Archbishop of Gniezno	Poland
Benjamín de Arriba y Castro (1886–1973)	Archbishop of Tarragona	(Francoist Spain) Spain
Fernando Quiroga y Palacios (1900–1971)	Archbishop of Santiago de Compostela	(Francoist Spain) Spain
Paul-Émile Léger (1904–1991)	Archbishop of Montreal	Canada
Crisanto Luque Sánchez (1889–1959)	Archbishop of Bogota	Colombia
Joseph Wendel (1901–1960)	Archbishop of Munich and Freising	West Germany
Alfredo Ottaviani (1890–1979)	Assessor of Supreme Sacred Congregation of the Holy Office	Italy
Valerian Gracias (1900–1978)	Archbishop of Bombay	India

== See also ==
- Cardinals created by Pius XI (previous)
- Cardinals created by John XXIII (successor)
