= Jozef-Ernest van Roey =

Belgian Catholic cardinal

His Eminence Jozef-Ernest van Roey
- Cardinal, Archbishop of Mechelen; Primate of Belgium
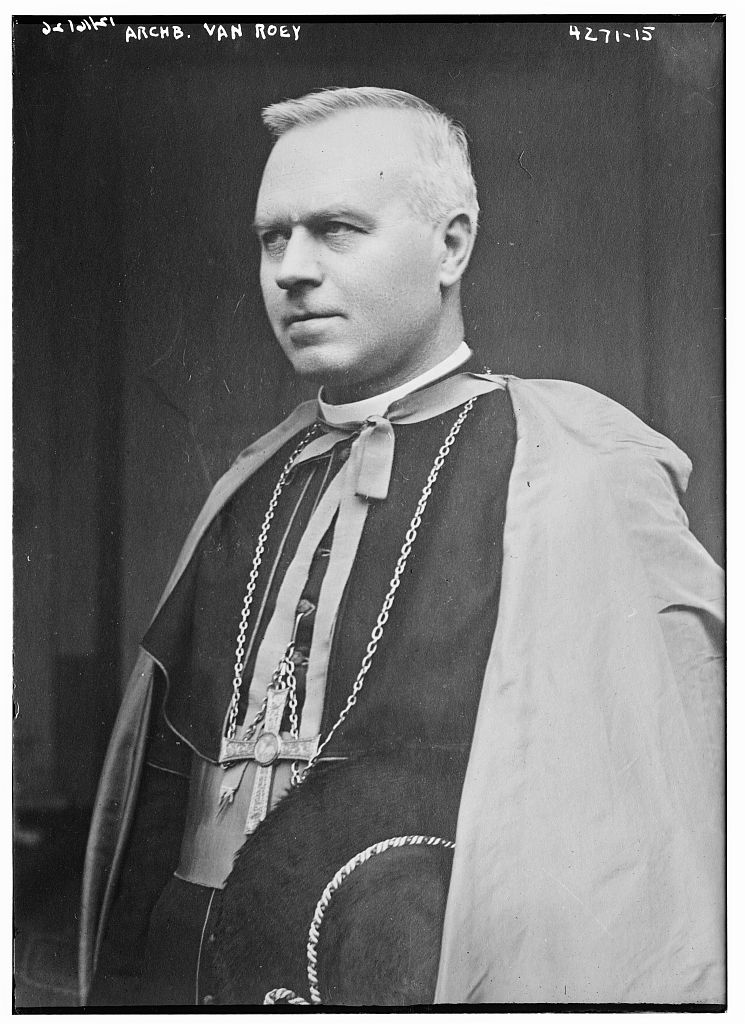
- Van Roey as Archbishop of Mechelen (c. 1926)
- Church: Roman Catholic
- Archdiocese: Mechelen
- In office: 12 March 1926 – 6 August 1961
- Predecessor: Désiré-Joseph Mercier
- Successor: Leo Joseph Suenens
- Other posts: Cardinal-Priest of Santa Maria in Ara Coeli; Military Apostolic Vicar of Belgium

Orders
- Ordination: 18 September 1897 by Pierre-Lambert Goossens
- Consecration: 25 April 1926 by Clemente Micara
- Created cardinal: 20 June 1927 by Pius XI
- Rank: Cardinal-Priest

Personal details
- Born: 13 January 1874 Vorselaar, Flanders, Belgium
- Died: 6 August 1961 (aged 87) Mechelen, Flanders, Belgium
- Buried: St. Rumbold's Cathedral

Styles of Jozef-Ernest van Roey
- Reference style: His Eminence
- Spoken style: Your Eminence
- Informal style: Cardinal
- See: Mechelen

Jozef-Ernest van Roey (13 January 1874 – 6 August 1961) was a Belgian Catholic prelate who served as Archbishop of Mechelen from 1926 until his death. He was elevated to the cardinalate in 1927. He was a significant figure in Catholic resistance to Nazism in Belgium.

By the time of his death in 1961, although the second-to-last Pius XI appointee, (Note: The last Pius XI appointee, Manuel Gonçalves Cerejeira, had been appointed 10 months after the Lateran Treaty. He died in 1977.) he was the last living Cardinal who had been appointed during the Roman Question Era, before the ratification of the Lateran Treaty.

== Biography ==
Jozef-Ernest van Roey was born in Vorselaar, as the first of the five children of Stanislas van Roey and Anna-Maria Bartholomeus. His siblings were named Bernadette, Louis, Véronique, and Stephanie (who became a nun). He was baptized the same day of his birth in the parish church of Vorselaar. Van Roey studied under the Jesuits in Vorselaar before entering Saint-Joseph School in Herentals in 1885. He graduated in 1892, whence he entered the minor seminary in Mechelen. From 1894 to 1897, he studied Theology at the Major Seminary, Mechelen. He was ordained to the priesthood by Cardinal Pierre-Lambert Goossens on 18 September 1897.

Van Roey then furthered his studies at the University of Louvain, from where he obtained his doctorate in theology and the habilitation in 1903. He taught at the Collège Americaine from 1901 to 1905, and at the University of Louvain from 1905 to 1907. During this time, Van Roey also became a friend of Columba Marmion, OSB, who would later be beatified in 2000. On 19 May 1907, he was made an honorary canon of the metropolitan chapter of Mechelen. He served as vicar general of the city from 30 September 1907 to 1925, and was raised to the rank of Domestic Prelate of His Holiness on 2 April 1909. Van Roey participated in the Conversations of Mechelen, a series of ecumenical dialogues between clergymen from the Roman Catholic and Anglican Churches hosted by Cardinal Désiré-Joseph Mercier, from 1921 to 1926, but for which he was less supportive. He became secretary of the diocesan synod in 1924, and a protonotary apostolic on 11 February 1925.

On 12 March 1926, Van Roey was appointed Archbishop of Mechelen, and thus Primate of Belgium, by Pope Pius XI. He received his episcopal consecration on the following 25 April from Archbishop Clemente Micara, with Bishops Gustave-Joseph Waffelaert and Gaston-Antoine Rasneur serving as co-consecrators, in the Cathedral of Mechelen. Pius XI created him Cardinal Priest of Santa Maria in Aracoeli in the consistory of 20 June 1927. The Belgian primate served as papal legate to the centennial celebration of the University of Louvain four days later, on 24 June. In February 1931, he denounced cremation, declaring, "That funeral honors should be paid to a cremated corpse is a defiance of Catholic conscience which objects to cremation...Any funeral is meaningless after destruction of the body by burning".

=== Nazi period ===
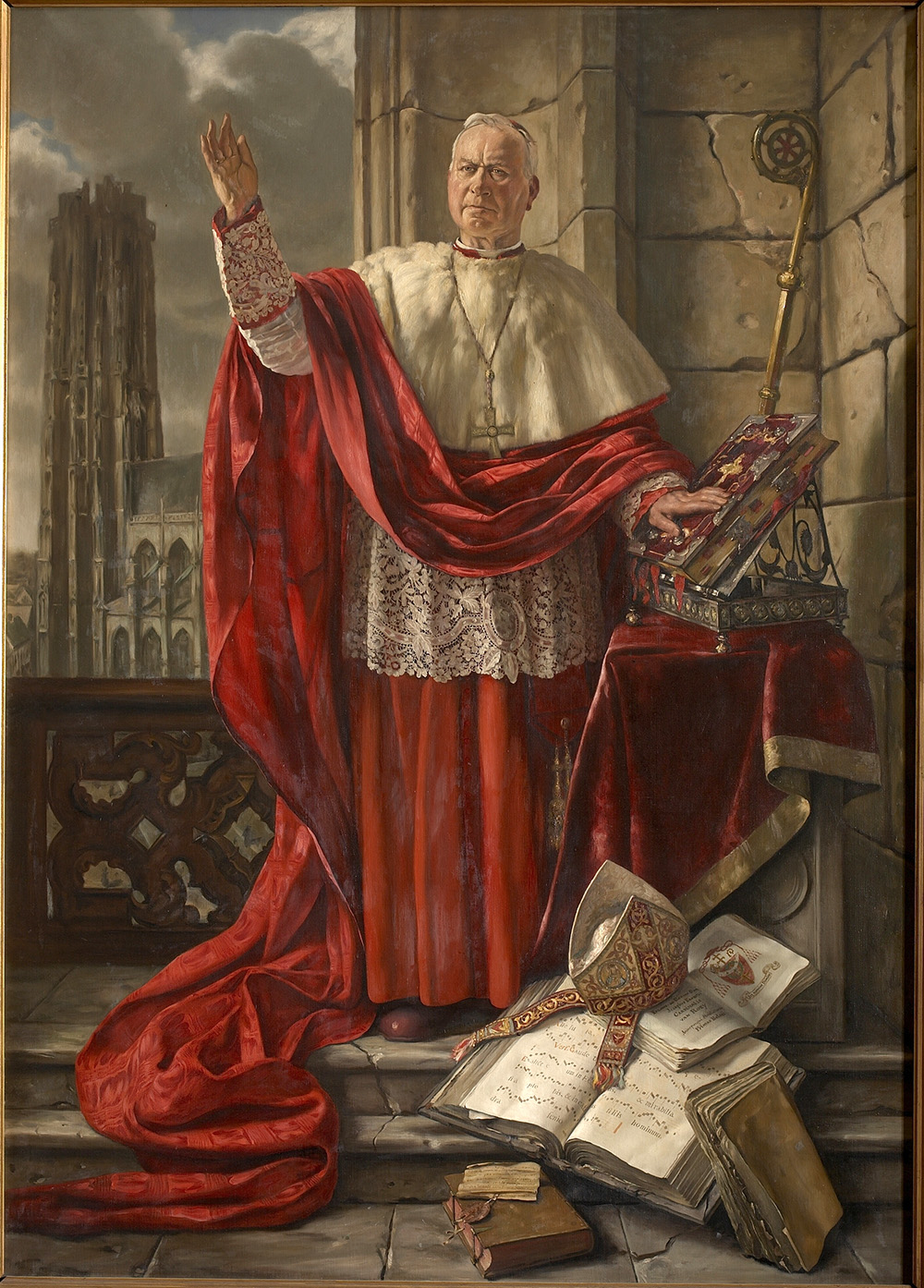
Portrait by Serge Ivanoff, 1944

The Cardinal was deeply opposed to Nazi Germany, and once said, "With Germany we step many degrees downward and reach the lowest possible depths. We have a duty of conscience to combat and to strive for the defeat of these dangers...Reason and good sense both direct us towards confidence, towards resistance".

In 1937, van Roey condemned Rexism as "a danger to the country and the Church" and issued a precautionary condemnation of anyone who cast a blank ballot, much to the anger of Adolf Hitler. Although some saw this as an unwarranted ecclesiastical entrance into the political sphere, the Cardinal defended himself by saying, "The hierarchic authority is perfectly entitled to pronounce on any political party or political movement in so far as that party or movement opposes religious well-being or the precepts of Christian morals", a statement which earned the support of Pope Pius XI.

Cardinal van Roey intervened with the authorities to rescue Jews from the Nazis, and encouraged various institutions to aid Jewish children. One of his acts of rescue was to open a geriatric centre in which Jews were housed, at which kosher Jewish cooks would be required who could therefore be given special passes protecting them from deportation. On 24 September 1942, van Roey and Queen Elizabeth of Belgium both intervened with the German authorities in Brussels after the arrest of six leading members of the Jewish community. As a result, five were released. The sixth, Edward Rotbel, Secretary of the Belgian Jewish Community, was a Hungarian citizen, and could not be saved from deportation to Auschwitz-Birkenau.

=== Post-war ===
Also known as the "Iron Bishop," he excommunicated members of the Flemish National Union following World War II. He was one of the cardinal electors in the 1939 papal conclave, and later participated in the conclave of 1958, which selected Pope John XXIII. Van Roey presided over the marriage of Prince Albert and Princess Paola Margherita Consiglia Ruffo di Calabria on 2 July 1959, and of King Baudouin I and Doña Fabiola de Mora y Aragón on 15 December 1960. He protested against the abdication of King Leopold III in favor of his son, Baudouin.

Van Roey, who had long suffered from a circulatory illness, was administered the last rites and Communion by Bishop Leo Suenens on 5 August 1961. At 6:05 a.m. on the next day, he died at the age of 87. After lying in state for three days in the archiepiscopal palace of Mechelen, his funeral Mass was held on 10 August, and was attended by King Leopold and Queen Elizabeth of Belgium, Prime Minister Théo Lefèvre, the ministers of state, the entire Belgian episcopate, and Cardinals Francis Spellman and Bernardus Johannes Alfrink. Van Roey was then buried in the crypt of the Cathedral of Mechelen, next to the vault of Cardinal Engelbert Sterckx, in accord with his explicit requests.

== See also ==
- Catholic resistance to Nazism

Catholic Church titles
Preceded by Désiré-Joseph Mercier	19th Archbishop of Mechelen; 1926–1961	Succeeded by Leo Joseph Suenens
