= Cardinal electors for the 1958 conclave =

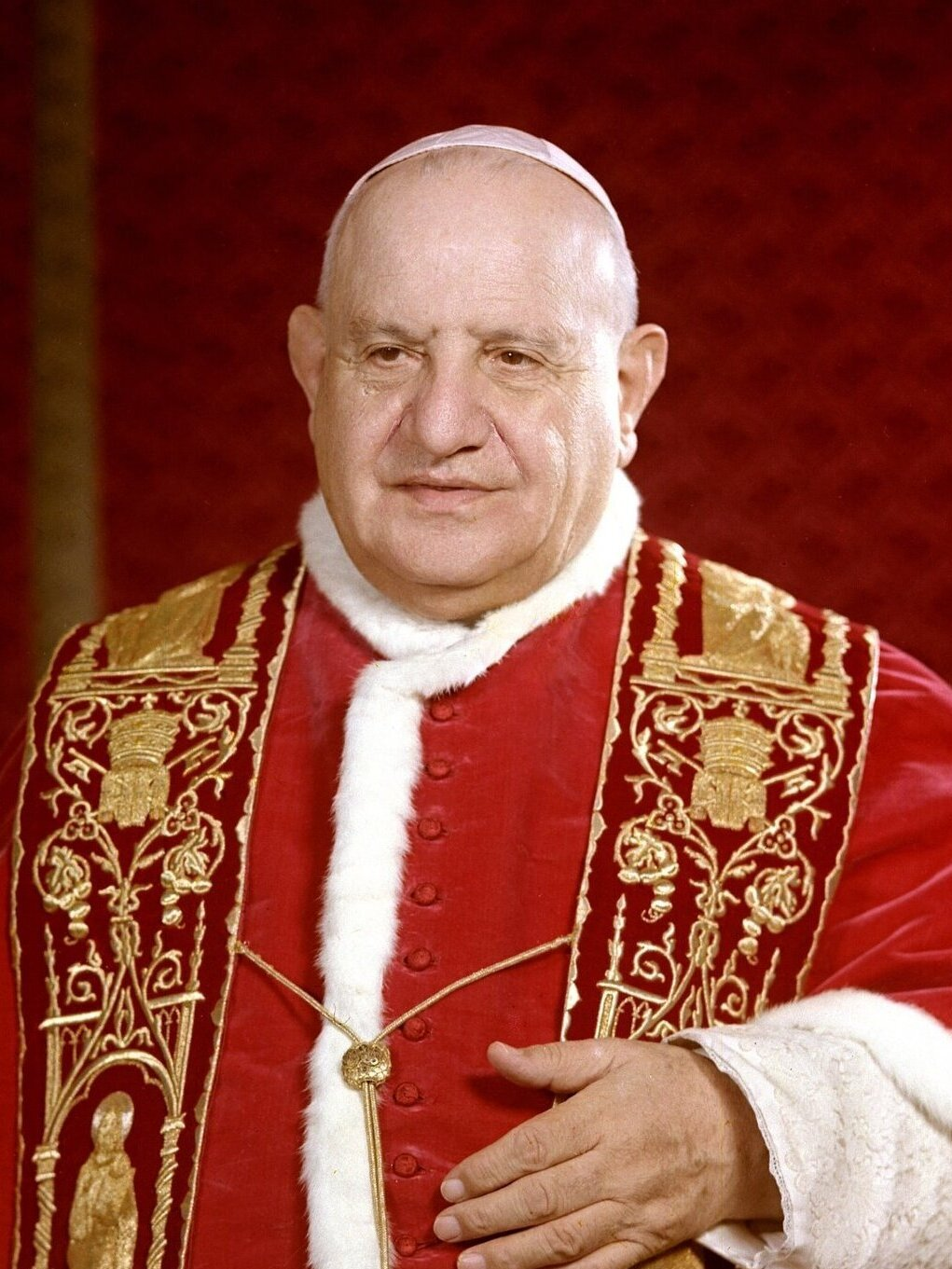
Cardinal Angelo Roncalli was elected Pope John XXIII by the 1958 conclave on 28 October.

The papal conclave of 1958 was convened to elect a pope, the leader of the Catholic Church, to succeed Pope Pius XII following his death on 9 October 1958.

Of the 54 members of the College of Cardinals at the time of Pius XII's death, 51 participated in the subsequent conclave. Of the 51 attending electors, 6 were cardinal bishops, 43 were cardinal priests, and 2 were cardinal deacons; 13 had been created cardinals by Pope Pius XI and 38 by Pope Pius XII; 12 worked in the service of the Holy See (such as in the Roman Curia) and 39 were in pastoral ministry outside Rome. The oldest cardinal elector in the conclave was Georges Grente, at the age of 86, and the youngest was Giuseppe Siri, at the age of 52.

The cardinal electors entered the Sistine Chapel to begin the conclave on 25 October 1958. On 28 October, after eleven ballots over four days, they elected Cardinal Angelo Roncalli, the patriarch of Venice, who took the papal name John XXIII.

== Cardinal electors ==
The data below are as of 9 October 1958, the date on which the Holy See became vacant. Cardinals belonging to institutes of consecrated life or to societies of apostolic life are indicated by the relevant post-nominal letters.

* Elected pope

Rank	Name	Country	Born	Order	Consistory	Office
1	Eugène Tisserant	France	24 March 1884 (age 74)	CB	15 June 1936; Pius XI	Prefect of the Congregation of Ceremonies, Librarian of the Vatican Library, Archivist of the Vatican Secret Archive (Dean)
2	Clemente Micara	Italy	24 December 1879 (age 78)	CB	18 February 1946; Pius XII	Vicar General of Rome (Vice-Dean)
3	Giuseppe Pizzardo	Italy	13 July 1877 (age 81)	CB	13 December 1937; Pius XI	Prefect of the Congregation of Seminaries and Universities
4	Benedetto Aloisi Masella	Italy	29 June 1879 (age 79)	CB	18 February 1946; Pius XII	Prefect of the Congregation of the Discipline of the Sacraments, Camerlengo of the Holy Roman Church
5	Federico Tedeschini	Italy	12 October 1873 (age 84)	CB	13 March 1933; Pius XI	Datary of the Apostolic Dataria
6	Marcello Mimmi	Italy	18 July 1882 (age 76)	CB	12 January 1953; Pius XII	Secretary of the Sacred Consistorial Congregation
7	Jozef-Ernest van Roey	Belgium	13 January 1874 (age 84)	CP	20 June 1927; Pius XI	Archbishop of Mechelen–Brussels
8	Manuel Gonçalves Cerejeira	Portugal	29 November 1888 (age 69)	CP	16 December 1929; Pius XI	Patriarch of Lisbon
9	Achille Liénart	France	7 February 1884 (age 74)	CP	30 June 1930; Pius XI	Bishop of Lille
10	Pietro Fumasoni Biondi	Italy	4 September 1872 (age 86)	CP	13 March 1933; Pius XI	Prefect of the Congregation for Propagation of the Faith
11	Maurilio Fossati OSSGCN	Italy	24 May 1876 (age 82)	CP	13 March 1933; Pius XI	Archbishop of Turin
12	Elia Dalla Costa	Italy	14 May 1872 (age 86)	CP	13 March 1933; Pius XI	Archbishop of Florence
13	Ignatius Gabriel I Tappouni	Lebanon	3 November 1879 (age 78)	CP	16 December 1935; Pius XI	Syriac Patriarch of Antioch
14	Santiago Copello	Argentina	7 January 1880 (age 78)	CP	16 December 1935; Pius XI	Archbishop of Buenos Aires
15	Pierre-Marie Gerlier	France	14 January 1880 (age 78)	CP	13 December 1937; Pius XI	Archbishop of Lyon
16	Gregorio Pietro Agagianian	Lebanon	18 September 1895 (age 63)	CP	18 February 1946; Pius XII	Armenian Patriarch of Cilicia
17	James McGuigan	Canada	26 November 1894 (age 63)	CP	18 February 1946; Pius XII	Archbishop of Toronto
18	Clément Roques	France	8 December 1880 (age 77)	CP	18 February 1946; Pius XII	Archbishop of Rennes
19	Carlos Carmelo Vasconcellos Motta	Brazil	16 July 1890 (age 68)	CP	18 February 1946; Pius XII	Archbishop of São Paulo
20	Norman Gilroy	Australia	22 January 1896 (age 62)	CP	18 February 1946; Pius XII	Archbishop of Sydney
21	Francis Spellman	United States	4 May 1889 (age 69)	CP	18 February 1946; Pius XII	Archbishop of New York
22	José María Caro Rodríguez	Chile	23 June 1866 (age 92)	CP	18 February 1946; Pius XII	Archbishop of Santiago de Chile
23	Teodósio de Gouveia	Mozambique	13 May 1889 (age 69)	CP	18 February 1946; Pius XII	Archbishop of Lourenço Marques
24	Jaime de Barros Câmara	Brazil	3 July 1894 (age 64)	CP	18 February 1946; Pius XII	Archbishop of São Sebastião do Rio de Janeiro
25	Enrique Pla y Deniel	Spain	19 December 1876 (age 81)	CP	18 February 1946; Pius XII	Archbishop of Toledo
26	Manuel Arteaga y Betancourt	Cuba	28 December 1879 (age 78)	CP	18 February 1946; Pius XII	Archbishop of San Cristóbal de la Habana
27	Josef Frings	West Germany	6 February 1887 (age 71)	CP	18 February 1946; Pius XII	Archbishop of Cologne
28	Ernesto Ruffini	Italy	19 January 1888 (age 70)	CP	18 February 1946; Pius XII	Archbishop of Palermo
29	Antonio Caggiano	Argentina	30 January 1889 (age 69)	CP	18 February 1946; Pius XII	Bishop of Rosario
30	Thomas Tien Ken-sin SVD	China	24 October 1890 (age 67)	CP	18 February 1946; Pius XII	Archbishop of Beijing
31	Augusto da Silva	Brazil	8 April 1876 (age 82)	CP	12 January 1953; Pius XII	Archbishop of São Salvador da Bahia
32	Gaetano Cicognani	Italy	26 November 1881 (age 76)	CP	12 January 1953; Pius XII	Prefect of the Sacred Congregation of Rites
33	Angelo Roncalli*	Italy	25 November 1881 (age 76)	CP	12 January 1953; Pius XII	Patriarch of Venice
34	Valerio Valeri	Italy	7 November 1883 (age 74)	CP	12 January 1953; Pius XII	Prefect of the Congregation for Religious
35	Pietro Ciriaci	Italy	2 December 1885 (age 72)	CP	12 January 1953; Pius XII	Prefect of the Congregation of the Council
36	Maurice Feltin	France	15 May 1883 (age 75)	CP	12 January 1953; Pius XII	Archbishop of Paris
37	Carlos María de la Torre	Ecuador	15 November 1873 (age 84)	CP	12 January 1953; Pius XII	Archbishop of Quito
38	Georges Grente	France	5 May 1872 (age 86)	CP	12 January 1953; Pius XII	Archbishop of Le Mans
39	Giuseppe Siri	Italy	20 May 1906 (age 52)	CP	12 January 1953; Pius XII	Archbishop of Genoa
40	John D'Alton	Ireland	11 October 1882 (age 75)	CP	12 January 1953; Pius XII	Archbishop of Armagh
41	James Francis McIntyre	United States	25 June 1886 (age 72)	CP	12 January 1953; Pius XII	Archbishop of Los Angeles
42	Giacomo Lercaro	Italy	28 October 1891 (age 66)	CP	12 January 1953; Pius XII	Archbishop of Bologna
43	Stefan Wyszyński	Poland	3 August 1901 (age 57)	CP	12 January 1953; Pius XII	Archbishop of Gniezno and Warsaw
44	Benjamín de Arriba y Castro	Spain	8 April 1886 (age 72)	CP	12 January 1953; Pius XII	Archbishop of Tarragona
45	Fernando Quiroga Palacios	Spain	21 January 1900 (age 58)	CP	12 January 1953; Pius XII	Archbishop of Santiago de Compostela
46	Paul-Émile Léger PSS	Canada	26 April 1904 (age 54)	CP	12 January 1953; Pius XII	Archbishop of Montreal
47	Crisanto Luque Sánchez	Colombia	1 February 1889 (age 69)	CP	12 January 1953; Pius XII	Archbishop of Bogotá
48	Valerian Gracias	India	23 October 1900 (age 57)	CP	12 January 1953; Pius XII	Archbishop of Bombay
49	Joseph Wendel	West Germany	27 May 1901 (age 57)	CP	12 January 1953; Pius XII	Archbishop of Munich and Freising
50	Nicola Canali	Italy	6 June 1874 (age 84)	CD	16 December 1935; Pius XI	Major Penitentiary of the Apostolic Penitentiary (Protodeacon)
51	Alfredo Ottaviani	Italy	29 October 1890 (age 67)	CD	12 January 1953; Pius XII	Pro-Secretary of the Congregation of the Holy Office

=== Not in attendance ===
Rank	Name	Country	Born	Order	Consistory	Office	Reason for absence
1	József Mindszenty	Hungary	29 March 1892 (age 66)	CP	18 February 1946; Pius XII	Archbishop of Esztergom	Confined to US Embassy
2	Edward Aloysius Mooney	United States	15 November 1873 (age 84)	CP	18 February 1946; Pius XII	Archbishop of Detroit	Died three hours before the conclave
3	Aloysius Stepinac	Yugoslavia	8 May 1898 (age 60)	CP	12 January 1953; Pius XII	Archbishop of Zagreb	Under house arrest

== Cardinal electors by continent and country ==
The 51 attending cardinal electors were from 20 countries. The countries with the greatest number of cardinal electors were Italy (seventeen), France (six), and Brazil (three).

* Continent or country of elected pope

Cardinal electors by continent
Continent	Number	Percentage
Africa	1	2.0%
North America	5	9.8%
South America	8	15.7%
Asia	4	7.8%
Europe*	32	62.7%
Oceania	1	2.0%
Total	51	100.0%

Cardinal electors by country
Country	Continent	Number
Argentina	South America	2
Australia	Oceania	1
Belgium	Europe	1
Brazil	South America	3
Canada	North America	2
China	Asia	1
Colombia	South America	1
Cuba	North America	1
Ecuador	South America	1
France	Europe	6
India	Asia	1
Ireland	Europe	1
Italy*	Europe	17
Lebanon	Asia	2
Mozambique	Africa	1
Poland	Europe	1
Portugal	Europe	1
Spain	Europe	3
United States	North America	2
West Germany	Europe	2
Total		51

== See also ==
- Cardinals created by Pius XI
- Cardinals created by Pius XII
- Cardinal electors for the 1939 conclave
- Cardinal electors in the 1963 conclave
