= Giacinto Longhin =

Bishop of Treviso

Blessed Giacinto Longhin OFMCap
- Bishop of Treviso
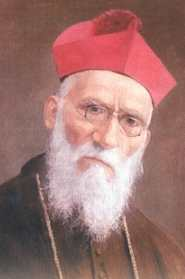
- Church: Roman Catholic Church
- Diocese: Treviso
- See: Treviso
- Appointed: 16 April 1904
- Installed: 6 August 1904
- Term ended: 26 June 1936
- Predecessor: Giuseppe Apollonio
- Successor: Antonio Mantiero
- Other post: Titular Archbishop of Patræ (1928-36)
- Previous post: Apostolic Administrator of Udine (1927–28)

Orders
- Ordination: 19 June 1886 by Domenico Agostini
- Consecration: 17 April 1904 by Rafael Merry del Val
- Rank: Archbishop ("ad personam")

Personal details
- Born: Giacinto Bonaventura Longhin; 22 November 1863 Fiumicello di Campodarsego, Padua, Kingdom of Italy
- Died: 26 June 1936 (aged 72) Treviso, Kingdom of Italy
- Buried: Treviso Cathedral

Sainthood
- Feast day: 26 June
- Venerated in: Roman Catholic Church
- Title as Saint: Bishop
- Beatified: 20 October 2002; Saint Peter's Square, Vatican City by Pope John Paul II
- Attributes: Episcopal attire; Franciscan habit; Crozier
- Patronage: Diocese of Treviso
- Shrines: Our Lady of Morning Star Parish Church, Indang, Cavite

Ordination history of Giacinto Longhin
History
Priestly ordination
- Ordained by: Domenico Agostini
Episcopal consecration
- Principal consecrator: Rafael Merry del Val
- Co-consecrators: Giuseppe Maria Costantini; Francesco Sogaro
Episcopal succession
Bishops consecrated by Giacinto Longhin as principal consecrator
- Eugenio Beccegato: 17 June 1917
- Carlo Agostini: 10 April 1932

Giacinto Bonaventura Longhin (22 November 1863 – 26 June 1936), religious name Andrea di Campodarsego, was an Italian Capuchin friar who served as the Bishop of Treviso from 1904 until his death. Longhin held various roles of leadership within his order following his ordination such as acting as a teacher in Udine and acting as the Provincial Minister for his order. He became close friends with Giuseppe Melchiorre Sarto, Cardinal Patriarch of Venice. The latter became Pope Pius X (canonized on 29 May 1954) in 1903 who made his old friend Longhin the new head for the vacant Treviso episcopal see.

The bishop became noted for his devotion to pastoral reform initiatives that sought to strengthen the spiritual formation for seminarians and ongoing formation for the diocesan priests. He likewise undertook three separate pastoral visits because he wanted to meet all his parishioners in each parish encompassing the diocese. He was active in organizing and collaborating in relief initiatives during World War I and was even awarded the Cross of Merit for his activism.

His death prompted widespread calls for the beatification cause to be initialized. This cause materialized in 1964 and resulted in the declaration that the late bishop was Venerable in 1998 after Pope John Paul II confirmed his heroic virtue. John Paul II later beatified Longhin in 2002 in Saint Peter's Square after the 1964 cure of a man with peritonitis was approved as a miraculous intervention from Longhin.

== Life ==
=== Education and priesthood ===
Giacinto Bonaventura Longhin was born on 22 November 1863 in Padua as the sole child to the poor farmers Matteo Longhin and Giudetta Marin. His baptism was celebrated on 23 November and he was baptized as "Giacinto Bonaventura".

In his childhood he felt drawn to the priesthood and he entered the Order of Friars Minor Capuchin despite the protests of his father. His father worked alone on the farm and did not wish to be deprived of his son in such arduous work. He assumed the religious name "Andrea di Campodarsego" on 27 August 1879 after vesting in the habit in Bassano del Grappa in Vicenza (beginning his novitiate period). He studied in both Padua (humanistic studies) and Venice (theological studies) and made his solemn religious profession on 4 October 1883. He was ordained to the priesthood in Venice on 19 June 1886. Longhin taught at an institute that his order managed in Udine and was the director for the order's teachers (1889–91) and then made the director of theological studies in Venice (1891-1902). He also served as the Provincial Minister for his order in Venice from 18 April 1902 onwards (until 1904) where he came to the attention of Giuseppe Melchiorre Sarto, Cardinal Patriarch of Venice who would become Pope Pius X in 1903. Sarto often had Longhin preach in Venice to the masses and the two became close friends during this period; it also pleased Longhin that his friend Sarto had been elected as pope.

=== Episcopate ===
Pius X appointed Longhin as the Bishop of Treviso in 1904 and he received his episcopal consecration in Rome (the pope wanted it to be held in Rome) on 17 April 1904 in the church of Trinità dei Monti. His installation in his new see was held on 6 August with reform as his sole concern; he issued two pastoral letters prior to his installation outlining his reform program. He travelled often to each parish in order to become close with his people while he set about reforming the seminaries to improve spiritual formation while seeking to encourage vocations. He also promoted retreats for spiritual renewal and encouraged the diocesan priests to support the idea. Longhin also became a close friend to Leopold Mandic during his episcopate. His first pastoral visit began in 1905 and concluded in 1910. He held two more pastoral visits in 1912 and in 1926. Pope Pius X often lauded Longhin's work in Treviso and once hailed him as a "gifted bishop" and "a man who would leave an indelible mark of apostolic zeal on the diocese" that remained dear to the pope's heart.

Throughout the raging European conflict he remained in his diocese to minister to refugees as well as to the wounded and to the poor. He also restored parishes that had been ruined and was even awarded the Cross of Merit for his good deeds. It was in that war that he helped to organize and run relief efforts for people. He and other priests were convicted of defeatism and imprisoned for a brief period since he chose no side in the conflict. He was released not long after and continued the relief efforts. Following the war he worked with social movements and was made as the apostolic visitor to Padua in 1923 at the direction of Pope Pius XI. He was also made the apostolic administrator for the vacant Udine see until the pope could appoint a new prelate to head that see. The pope saw fit to elevate Longhin "ad personam" as an archbishop in 1928 but did not elevate his see as an archbishopric. He continued to hold his post in Treviso and remained there until his death. Pius XI in October 1923 acknowledged the "great services" the bishop rendered for the flock and said that "he has worked so much for the Church" through his apostolic zeal. In 1929 the Cardinal Patriarch of Venice Pietro La Fontaine wrote that Longhin exemplified "the Good Shepherd in the Gospel" who remained "true to the original".

Longhin supported the rights of workers and railed against worker exploitation as a sinful act. He likewise - in April 1914 - declared to be sacred "the right of workmen to organize themselves ... in unions for their own economic and moral upgrading". He encouraged religious orders to operate within his diocese and welcomed orders such as the Carmelites and the Salesians of Don Bosco as well as others such as the Passionists. In 1920 he supported the Christian union movement known as "Leghe Bianche" and came to oppose fascism after Benito Mussolini secured power in late 1922 after his march on Rome. Longhin later presided over two catechetical congresses in his diocese in 1922 and 1932.

=== Declining health and death ===
In 1932 he began to demonstrate the first signs of arteriosclerosis. He had been in Salzano at the end of a pastoral visitation for a Confirmation Mass on 3 October 1935 when he lost his sight. He was hospitalized at once in Treviso and was found to have had deficient cerebral circulation which had resulted in the loss of his sight. He celebrated his last Mass on 14 February 1936. Longhin died on 26 June 1936 after eighteen hours of agonizing pain. His funeral was held on 30 June with a large crowd amassing to farewell him; Longhin's remains were interred in the Treviso Cathedral later on 5 November 1936. His remains were inspected on 12–22 November 1984 and were found "entire with tender parts and a large part mummified".

== Beatification ==
The beatification process opened in Treviso on 21 April 1964 and later concluded its investigation on 26 June 1967 while another process had been undertaken in Udine from 1964 until 1965. Theologians assessed his individual writings to ensure such writings adhered to doctrine and confirmed them on 17 December 1971 as having contained no doctrinal errors. The introduction to the cause came on 15 December 1981 and an apostolic process for further investigation was later held from 18 June 1982 until 26 June 1985. The Congregation for the Causes of Saints validated these previous processes in Rome on 13 June 1986 and received the Positio for additional assessment in 1993.

Theologians assessed the dossier and approved it in their meeting on 19 December 1997 while the cardinals and bishops comprising the C.C.S. likewise assented to the cause on 6 October 1998. Longhin was declared to be Venerable on the following 21 December after Pope John Paul II confirmed that the late bishop had lived a model Christian life of heroic virtue.

Longhin's beatification depended upon a miracle (more often than not a healing) that science or medicine failed to explain. The miracle that led to Longhin's beatification was the 1964 cure of Dino Stella from diffuse peritonitis. The miracle was first investigated in the Italian diocese that it originated in prior to evidence being submitted to the C.C.S. who validated the investigation on 24 January 1997. But further investigations into the miracle could not take place until Longhin had been named as Venerable. Once that happened a medical panel of experts (some non-Catholic) approved that the healing had no scientific explanation in their meeting on 12 November 2001 (a previous meeting on 15 June 2000 proved inconclusive and warranted a second meeting). Theologians approved it later on 15 February 2002 after determining the miracle occurred due to petitions made for Longhin's intercession; the C.C.S. members confirmed the findings of both committees later that 16 April. John Paul II - a week later on 23 April - confirmed this miracle as such and beatified Longhin in Saint Peter's Square later that 20 October.

The current postulator for this cause is the Capuchin friar Carlo Calloni.
