= Camillo Caccia Dominioni =

Italian Roman Catholic cardinal

His Eminence Camillo Caccia-Dominioni
- Cardinal Protodeacon
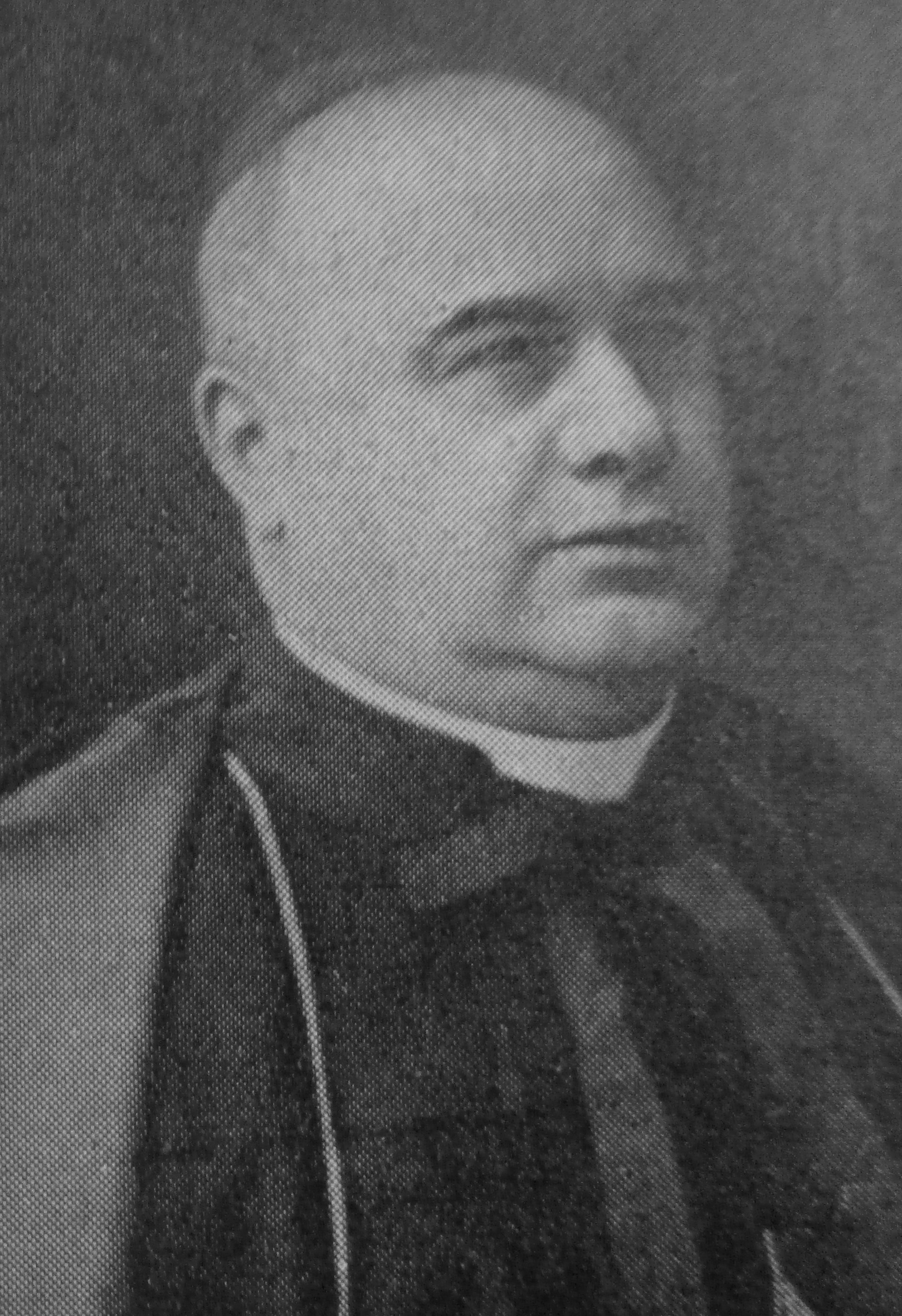
- Appointed: 16 December 1935
- Term ended: 12 November 1946
- Predecessor: Camillo Laurenti
- Successor: Nicola Canali
- Other post: Cardinal-Deacon of Santa Maria in Domnica
- Previous post: Prefect of the Pontifical Household (1921–1935)

Orders
- Ordination: 23 September 1899 by Andrea Carlo Ferrari
- Created cardinal: 16 December 1935 by Pope Pius XI
- Rank: Cardinal-Deacon

Personal details
- Born: Camillo Caccia-Dominioni; 7 February 1877 Milan, Lombardy, Kingdom of Italy
- Died: 12 November 1946 (aged 69) Rome, Italy
- Buried: Basilica of Ss. Ambrogio e Carlo
- Denomination: Roman Catholic
- Coat of arms

Styles of Camillo Caccia-Dominioni
- Reference style: His Eminence
- Spoken style: Your Eminence
- Religious style: Monsignor
- Informal style: Cardinal

Camillo Caccia-Dominioni (7 February 1877 – 12 November 1946) was an Italian cardinal of the Roman Catholic Church. He served as prefect of the Pontifical Household from 1921 to 1935, and was elevated to the cardinalate in 1935.

== Biography ==
Born in Milan, Camillo Caccia-Dominioni studied at the seminary in that same city before attending the Pontifical Gregorian University (from where he obtained his doctorate in canon law) and the Pontifical Academy of Ecclesiastical Nobles (from where he graduated in 1898) in Rome. He was ordained to the priesthood by Cardinal Andrea Ferrari on 23 September 1899. Caccia-Dominioni did pastoral work in Rome until 1921, and finished his studies in 1902. In 1903, he was appointed Coadjutor-Canon of St. Peter's Basilica.

Named Protonotary Apostolic on 27 June 1921, Caccia-Dominioni was raised to the rank of Monsignor on 24 September 1914. He was appointed Prefect of the Pontifical Household, the papal majordomo, by Pope Benedict XV on 16 June 1921. Upon the death of Pope Benedict on 22 January 1922, Caccia-Dominioni and all other major Vatican officials, in accord with custom, automatically lost their positions during the sede vacante. He was later confirmed as Prefect of the Pontifical Household by Pope Pius XI on the following 7 February and succeeded to the post of Canon of St. Peter's Basilica on 14 February 1924. Caccia-Dominioni was considered to be a protege of Pius XI, at whose final hours the former was present in his bedchamber.

Caccia-Dominioni was created Cardinal-Deacon of S. Maria in Domnica by Pope Pius XI in the consistory of 16 December 1935. He was one of the cardinal electors in the 1939 papal conclave, which selected Pope Pius XII. In virtue of his position of Protodeacon (the senior cardinal deacon), Caccia-Dominioni announced Pius XII's election and later crowned him on 12 March 1939.

David Kertzer, an American Jewish writer and critic of the Catholic Church, has claimed that Caccia-Dominioni was a pederast. Kertzer claims the fascist secret police OVRA had a file on him, which supposedly detailed that he often lured young boys to his apartment in Rome for sex, and claimed that the pope had been aware of this.

The cardinal died from a heart ailment in Rome, at age 69. He is buried in the crypt of the Basilica of Ss. Ambrogio e Carlo.

== Trivia ==
- It was falsely speculated that Caccia-Dominioni had been elevated to a cardinal in pectore by Pius XI in the consistory of 13 March 1933.

== Media ==
Catholic Church titles
| Preceded by Giovanni Tacci Porcelli | Prefect of the Pontifical Household; 16 June 1921 – 16 December 1935 | Succeeded by unknown |
| Preceded by Camillo Laurenti | Cardinal Protodeacon; 16 December 1935 – 12 November 1946 | Succeeded by Nicola Canali |
