= Nicola Canali =

Italian cardinal

His Eminence Nicola Canali
- President of the Pontifical Commission for the Vatican State; President of the Governorate of Vatican City State
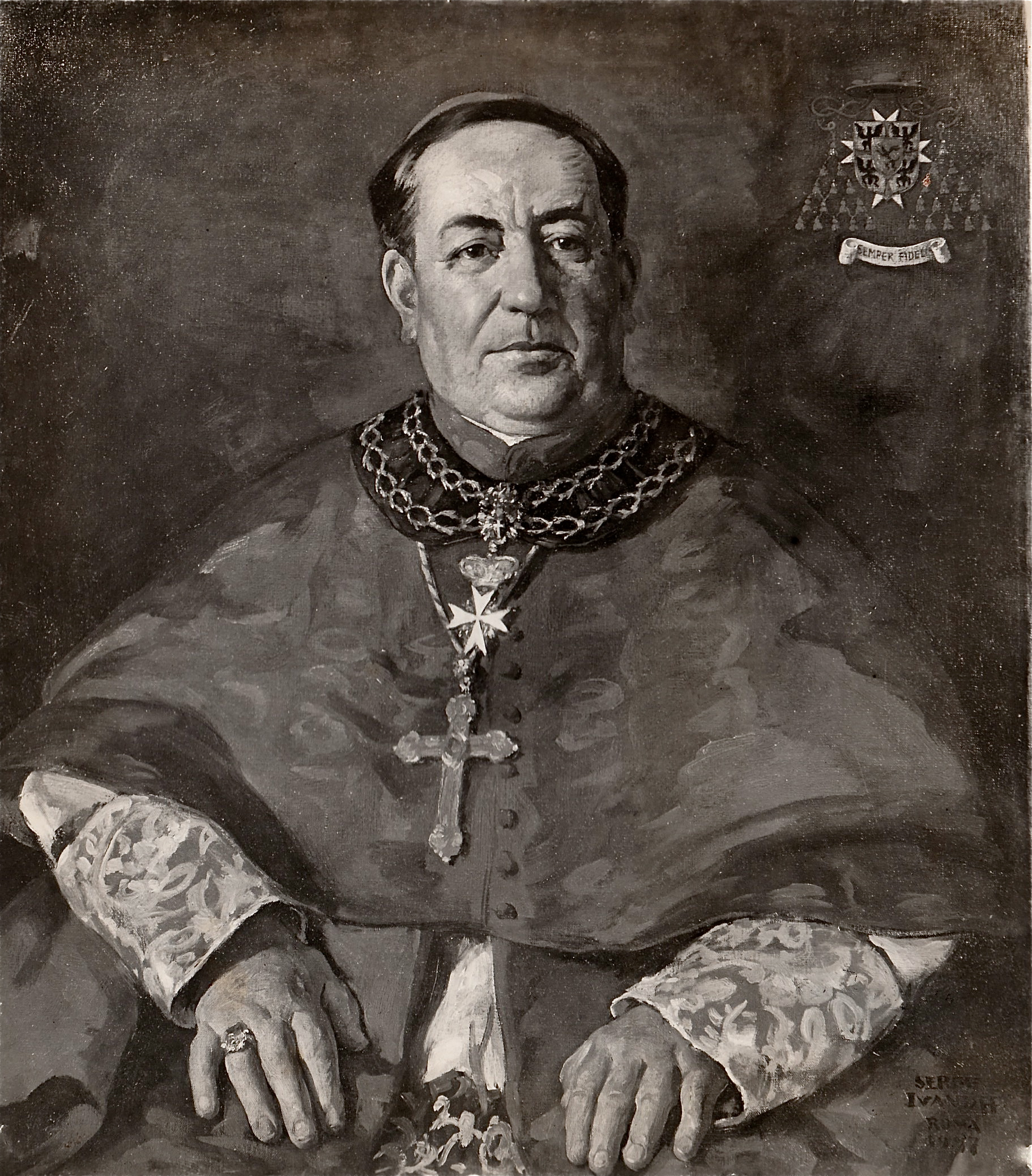
- Canali in 1938
- Church: Roman Catholic Church
- Appointed: 20 March 1939
- Term ended: 3 August 1961
- Successor: Amleto Giovanni Cicognani
- Other posts: Cardinal-Deacon of San Nicola in Carcere (1935–61); Grand Master of the Equestrian Order of the Holy Sepulchre of Jerusalem (1940–61); Major Penitentiary of the Apostolic Penitentiary (1941–61); Protodeacon (1946–61); Pro-President of the Administration of the Patrimony of the Apostolic See (1951–61)
- Previous posts: Substitute for General Affairs (1908–14); Secretary of the Congregation of Ceremonies (1914–26); Assessor of the Congregation of the Holy Office (1926–35); Camerlengo of the College of Cardinals (1950–51)

Orders
- Ordination: 31 March 1900 by Francesco Satolli
- Created cardinal: 16 December 1935 by Pope Pius XI
- Rank: Cardinal-Deacon

Personal details
- Born: Nicola Canali; 6 June 1874 Rieti, Kingdom of Italy
- Died: 3 August 1961 (aged 87) Vatican City
- Buried: Sant'Onofrio al Gianicolo
- Parents: Filippo Canali; Leonetta Vincentini
- Education: Pontifical Gregorian University; Pontifical Academy of Saint Thomas Aquinas
- Motto: Semper fidelis
- Coat of arms

Nicola Canali (6 June 1874 – 3 August 1961) was an Italian cardinal of the Roman Catholic Church. He served as president of the Pontifical Commission for Vatican City State from 1939 and as Major Penitentiary from 1941 until his death, and was elevated to the cardinalate in 1935. He was Grand Master of the Order of the Holy Sepulchre of Jerusalem, a prestigious papal order of knighthood, from 1949 until 1960.

== Early life and education ==
Canali was born in Rieti to Marquis Filippo Canali and his wife, the Countess Leonetta Vincentini. After studying at the Pontifical Gregorian University and the Pontifical University of Saint Thomas Aquinas, Angelicum in Rome, he was ordained to the priesthood on 31 March 1900 in the Lateran Basilica.

== Career ==
On 1 September 1903, Canali was made private secretary to Cardinal Rafael Merry del Val and entered the Roman Curia, in the Secretariat of State. He was raised to the rank of Privy Chamberlain of His Holiness in November of that same year. On 21 March 1908, Monsignor Canali was appointed Substitute for General Affairs, or deputy, of the Secretary of State. He was made a Domestic Prelate of His Holiness on the following 23 March, and later Secretary of the Sacred Congregation of Ceremonies on 24 September 1914. As Secretary, he served as the second-highest official of that dicastery, successively under the brother Cardinals Serafino Vannutelli and Vincenzo Vannutelli. Canali was named assessor of the Holy Office on 27 June 1926, and a Protonotary Apostolic on the following 15 September.

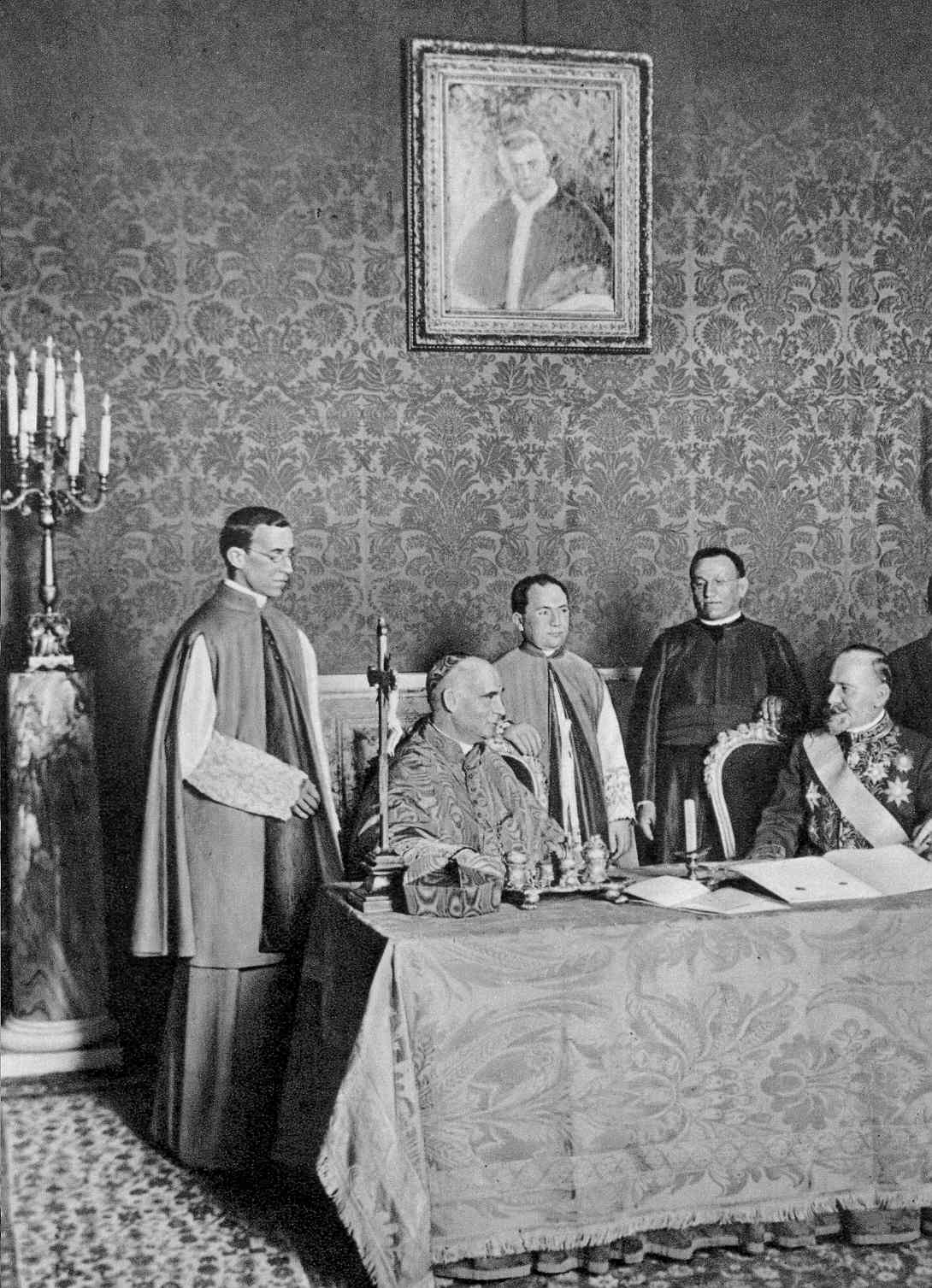
Cardinal Merry del Val and Milenko Vesnić signing the Concordat between the Holy See and Serbia in 1914. Left to right: Eugenio Pacelli (Secretary of the Congregation of Extraordinary Ecclesiastical Affairs), Rafael Merry del Val (Vatican Secretary of State), Nicola Canali (his private secretary), Mons. Dionigi Cardon (Vatican's negotiator in Belgrade), Milenko Radomar Vesnić (Special Minister of Serbia).

Coat of Arms of Cardinal Canali

Pope Pius XI created him Cardinal-Deacon of S. Nicola in Carcere in the consistory of 16 December 1935. Canali was one of the cardinal electors in the 1939 papal conclave that selected Pope Pius XII, who appointed him the first President of the Pontifical Commission for Vatican City State on 20 March 1939.

Made Major Penitentiary on 15 October 1941, the Cardinal was appointed Pro-President of the Administration of the Patrimony of the Apostolic See in 1951 (remaining in that post until his death), and participated in the 1958 papal conclave, which resulted in the election of Pope John XXIII. In virtue of his position as Cardinal Protodeacon, he both announced Pope John's election and later crowned him on 4 November 1958. He was made Protector of the Order of the Holy Sepulchre on 16 July 1940, and later its Grand Master on 26 December 1949. In 1951, Canali sought in vain to be elected Grand Master of the Sovereign Order of Malta, but the duties of that office were incompatible with his role in the Order of the Holy Sepulchre, rendering him unable to be considered for the office. Not satisfied, Canali sought the support of the Vatican to remove the sovereign character of the Order of Malta and put it under the sole tutelage of the Holy See. His plans failed, creating a profound crisis. It took a decision of Pope Pius XII to put an end to the controversy. On 24 January 1953, Pius XII promulgated answers to two questions that had been propounded to him, "Is the Order of Malta a religious order?" and "Is the Order of Malta still sovereign?" answering in the affirmative in both cases.

In 1949, when Azione Cattolica asked permission "to sell souvenirs in St. Peter's Square", Canali refused and said that "St. Peter's is a house of prayer". This followed a case of planned pickpocketing in St. Peter's Square, and the subsequent banning of all vendors, photographers, and beggars.

== Death ==
Canali died from pneumonia in his Vatican apartment, at age 87. He was buried in the church of S. Onofrio al Gianicolo in Rome. He was the last non-bishop cardinal to die before Pope John XXIII issued on 15 April 1962 the motu proprio Cum gravissima, providing that thenceforth all cardinals should receive episcopal consecration. Despite this, Canali was not the last cardinal who was never a bishop, since a few, such as Avery Dulles, have obtained dispensation from this rule.

== Sources ==
- Galimard Flavigny, Bertrand (2006). Histoire de l'ordre de Malte. Perrin, Paris. ISBN 978-2262021153.

Catholic Church titles
Preceded by none	President of the Pontifical Commission for Vatican City State; 20 March 1939 – 3 August 1961	Succeeded by Amleto Giovanni Cicognani
Preceded by Lorenzo Lauri	Major Penitentiary; 15 October 1941 – 3 August 1961	Succeeded by Arcadio Larraona Saralegui
Preceded by Camillo Caccia-Dominioni	Cardinal Protodeacon; 12 November 1946 – 3 August 1961	Succeeded by Alfredo Ottaviani
Preceded by Pope Pius XII	Grand Master of the Equestrian Order of the Holy Sepulchre of Jerusalem; 25 December 1949 – 19 August 1960	Succeeded by Eugène-Gabriel-Gervais-Laurent Tisserant
