= Georges Grente =

French Cardinal

His Eminence Georges Grente
- Cardinal-Bishop of Le Mans
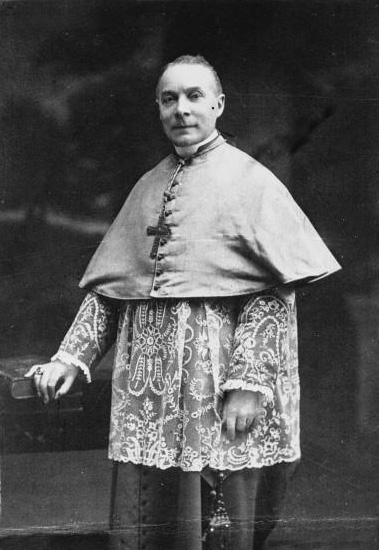
- Church: Roman Catholic Church
- Archdiocese: Archdiocese of Tours
- Province: Roman Catholic Archdiocese of Tours
- Metropolis: Roman Catholic Archdiocese of Tours
- Diocese: Le Mans
- Installed: 30 January 1918
- Term ended: 5 May 1959
- Predecessor: Raymond-Marie-Turiaf de La Porte
- Successor: Paul-Léon-Jean Chevalier
- Other posts: Cardinal Priest of S. Bernardo alle Terme; Assistant at the Pontifical Throne

Orders
- Ordination: 29 June 1895
- Consecration: 17 April 1918 by Cardinal Louis-Ernest Dubois, Bishops Claude Bardel and Joseph Guérard
- Created cardinal: 12 January 1953 by Pope Pius XII
- Rank: Cardinal-priest

Personal details
- Born: Georges-François-Xavier-Marie Grente; May 5, 1872 Percy, Coutances, France
- Died: May 5, 1959 (aged 87) Le Mans, France
- Buried: Cathedral of Le Mans
- Denomination: Roman Catholicism
- Education: University of Paris School of Law; Major Seminary of Coutances; Catholic Institute of Paris
- Motto: Dux unitam exemplar
- Coat of arms

Styles of Georges Grente
- Reference style: His Eminence
- Spoken style: Your Eminence
- Informal style: Cardinal
- See: Le Mans

Georges-François-Xavier-Marie Grente (5 May 1872 – 5 May 1959) was a French Cardinal of the Roman Catholic Church. He served as Archbishop of Le Mans from 1918 until his death, and was elevated to the cardinalate in 1953 by Pope Pius XII.

== Biography ==
Georges Grente was born in Percy, Coutances, and studied at the University of Paris School of Law, Major Seminary of Coutances, and Catholic Institute of Paris. He was ordained to the priesthood on 29 June 1895, and then taught at the minor seminary in Mortain until 1903.

Grente was director of the diocesan College of Saint Louis from 1903 to 1916, whence he became superior of St. Paul Institute in Cherbourg. He was made an honorary canon of the cathedral chapter of Coutances in 1917.

On 30 January 1918, Grente was appointed Bishop of Le Mans by Pope Benedict XV. He received his episcopal consecration on the following 17 April from Cardinal Louis-Ernest Dubois, with Bishops Claude Bardel and Joseph Guérard serving as co-consecrators. He was given the title of Assistant at the Pontifical Throne on 18 January 1933, and personal title of "Archbishop" in March 1943. During World War II, Grente worked in the French resistance movement.

Pope Pius XII created him Cardinal-Priest of S. Bernardo alle Terme in the consistory of 12 January 1953. Despite speculation that his poor health would prevent him from participating, Grente was one of the cardinal electors in the 1958 papal conclave, which selected Pope John XXIII. A member of the Académie française, he was in close correspondence with Charles de Gaulle as well. It was in a letter to Grente that de Gaulle made his famous distinction between la France chrétienne and la république läique.

The Cardinal died in Le Mans, on his 87th birthday, and was buried in the Cathedral of Le Mans (his heart however was interred in the church at Percy). He had served as the ordinary of that city for over forty years. Academically eminent but pretentious in manner, Grente was satirized by his clergy. He was subject to an attack by the Canard Enchaîné on his ownership of brothels near the cathedral purchased unsuccessfully (given opposition by civil and military authorities) in view of their closure, renewed by Jean Egen in 1973. In 1998, Grente was the posthumous object of an attempt at character assassination by Christian Gury.

Catholic Church titles
Preceded by Raymond-Marie-Turiaf de La Porte	Archbishop of Le Mans; 1918–1959	Succeeded by Paul-Léon-Jean Chevalier
Records
Preceded by José María Caro Rodríguez	Oldest living Member of the Sacred College; 4 December 1958 – 5 May 1959	Succeeded by Elia Dalla Costa
