= 1958 conclave =

Election of Catholic Pope John XXIII

Papal conclave October 1958

Dates and location
- 25–28 October 1958; Sistine Chapel, Apostolic Palace, Vatican City

Key officials
- Dean: Eugène Tisserant
- Sub-dean: Clemente Micara
- Camerlengo: Benedetto Aloisi Masella
- Protopriest: Jozef-Ernest van Roey
- Protodeacon: Nicola Canali
- Secretary: Alberto di Jorio

Election
- Electors: 51 (list)
- Candidates: See papabili
- Ballots: 11

Elected pope
- Angelo Roncalli; Name taken: John XXIII
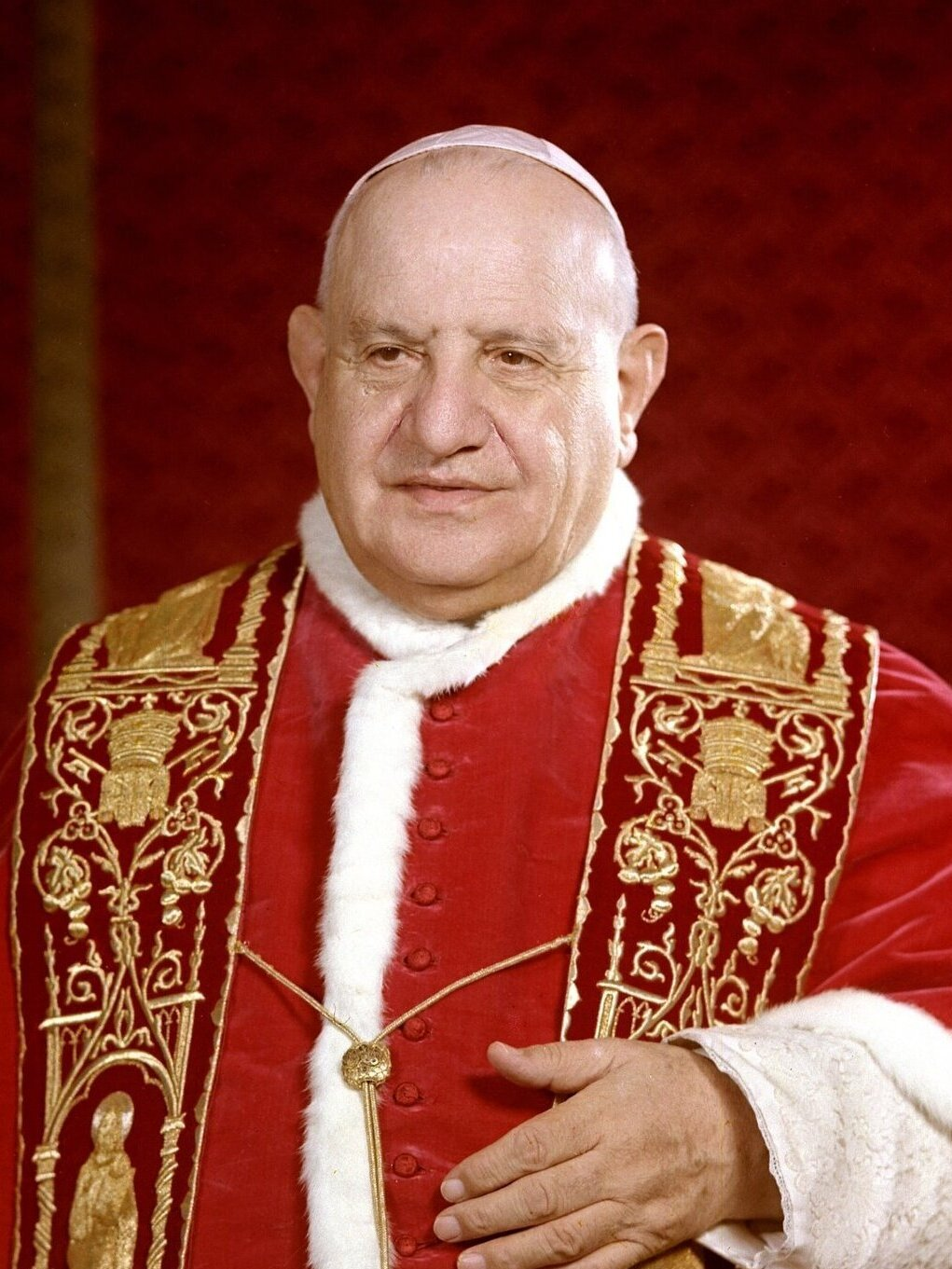

A conclave was held from 25 to 28 October 1958 to elect a pope to succeed Pius XII, who had died on 9 October 1958. Of the 53 members of the College of Cardinals, all but two attended. (Note: The current 80-year-old age limit for cardinal electors was introduced by Pope Paul VI in 1970.) On the eleventh ballot, the conclave elected Cardinal Angelo Roncalli, the patriarch of Venice. After accepting his election, he took the name John XXIII. He was the second patriarch of Venice to be elected pope in the 20th century, after Pius X in the 1903 conclave. John XXIII's coronation took place on 4 November 1958.

The communist governments of Hungary and Yugoslavia prevented Cardinals József Mindszenty and Aloysius Stepinac from traveling to Rome. In comparison with the 1922 conclave (when three cardinals failed to reach Rome in time when the conclave opened 10 days after the pope's death as required), or the 1939 conclave (when three cardinals reached Rome on the morning the conclave opened 18 days after the pope's death under new rules), all the cardinals who made the trip reached Rome by 22 October, with few days to spare before the conclave began 16 days after Pius XII's death. (Note: Cardinal Francis Spellman of New York, at sea en route to New York when Pius XII died, disembarked in the Azores and flew to Rome and then considered flying to New York and back in time for the start of the conclave.)

For the first time, the speed of travel matched the internationalization of the College of Cardinals, thanks to advancements in air travel. As one newspaper put it, "The archbishop of New York can reach Rome today faster than the archbishop of Palermo did a generation ago." This conclave included cardinals from 21 countries compared to 16 at the previous conclave, and 18 non-Europeans compared to seven. The 17 Italians out of 51 represented their lowest percentage since 1455.

== Papabili ==
The cardinals anticipated a long conclave. There was no "dominating personality" as Pius XII had been in 1939, and the proverbial search for contrast ('fat pope, thin pope') suggested a "pastoral pope" to follow a "diplomatic pope". Another analysis set the likely age range between 55 and 70, with a preference for an Italian outside the Curia. Several papabili were discussed. The conservative Giuseppe Siri of Genoa, supportive of the Vatican's centralization of authority, was only 52, and his election would have meant another long papacy like that of Pius IX. The liberal Giacomo Lercaro of Bologna, more disposed to granting independence to local authorities, was 67. Angelo Roncalli had become the patriarch of Venice after more than 25 years in the diplomatic service of the Holy See in Bulgaria, Turkey and France. Approaching 77, his age marked him as a possible compromise choice in expectation of a short pontificate, along with his "reputation for being broad-minded and conciliatory". He also represented a combination of diplomatic and pastoral experience.

Gregorio Pietro Agagianian, the Catholic Armenian patriarch of Cilicia, had spent much of his adult life in Rome. (Note: Agagianian was a faculty member or administrator at several Roman institutions between 1921 and 1937, was named President of the Pontifical Commission for the Revision of the Code of Oriental Canon Law in 1955, and joined the Congregation for the Propagation of the Faith in 1958.) He was relatively young at 63 and highly respected, but his non-Italian heritage would have made him a surprising choice. Other candidates mentioned were Ernesto Ruffini of Palermo and two Curia officials, Valerio Valeri and Alfredo Ottaviani. Benedetto Aloisi Masella, the 79-year-old veteran diplomat who was chosen as camerlengo on 9 October, was also mentioned as a compromise candidate with "his chances diminished because of his age". Also mentioned, in a radical departure from tradition, was Giovanni Montini, the archbishop of Milan, whom Pius XII had not made a cardinal. The New York Times cast a wide net, offering more than a dozen names, including two non-Italians, Paul-Émile Léger of Montreal and Manuel Goncalves Cerejeira of Lisbon. Life magazine's coverage included portraits of Agagianian, Lercaro, Montini, Ottaviani, Roncalli, Ruffini, Siri, and Valeri. As the press speculated about interest in a transitional pope and possible discussions among the cardinal electors, the Vatican's mouthpiece, L'Osservatore Romano denounced the "irresponsible lightness" with which the press approached the subject, especially its reports of electioneering. A Moscow radio broadcast criticized Pius XII for meddling in politics and hoped for a new pope that was devoted instead to the "religious problems".

Betting establishments reported Roncalli was favored by their clients, given 2 to 1 odds. By the second day of the conclave, after four ballots produced no results, speculation centered on Roncalli, Valeri, Masella, and Agagianian, the first three elderly and the last an unlikely outsider.

== Participants ==
Pope Pius XII tried in the consistory of 1953 to bring the membership of the College of Cardinals to the maximum of 70, the limit established by Pope Sixtus V in the 16th century. On that occasion he named 24 cardinals. When one cardinal-designate, Carlo Agostini, died on 28 December at the age of 64, the Vatican announced another cardinal designate the next day, Valerian Gracias of India, so the College reached its full complement of 70 members, with 26 of them Italian.

Deaths in the intervening five years, including those of Celso Costantini on 17 October and Edward Mooney of Detroit on 25 October just hours before the start of the conclave, had reduced the College to 53 members. József Mindszenty feared the Communist government of Hungary would not allow him to return if he attended the conclave, (Note: Mindszenty had been living in the U.S. Legation in Budapest since 4 November 1956.) and government authorities refused to grant him safe conduct despite a request by the U.S. State Department at the request of the College of Cardinals. Aloysius Stepinac was too ill to travel from Zagreb, and he was forbidden from leaving Yugoslavia as a condition of his release from prison in 1951. (Note: He had not come to Rome when he was made a cardinal in January 1953 for fear of not being allowed to return to Yugoslavia.)

This reduced the number of attendees to 51, 15 of whom were in Rome on 9 October, 45 of whom were in or near Rome by 16 October. All 51 reached Rome by 22 October. Of the 51 electors who participated in the conclave, 17 were Italians. The required two-thirds plus one majority was 35 votes.

== Balloting ==
The cardinals were required to set the starting date of the conclave between the 15th and 18th days following the death of the pope, no earlier than 24 October and no later than 27 October. On 11 October, they set 25 October for its opening. The conclave was held from 25 to 28 October at the Sistine Chapel in the Vatican. The voting patterns during the conclave were hard to establish, but some information was consistently reported. Identified as a group with a particular interest, the French cardinals were thought to seek greater independence from Rome, and Stefan Wyszynski of Poland was thought to be their ally. Several of the French also knew that Roncalli, as nuncio in Paris, had been influential in the careers. Roncalli himself had learned that he had many supporters in conversations with other cardinals before the conclave began. One newspaper reported that Cardinal Pierre-Marie Gerlier of Lyon, asked whom the French cardinals supported as he entered the conclave, said "Roncalli". Giovanni Montini (later Pope Paul VI), a longtime curia official who had recently become Archbishop of Milan, consistently received two votes even though he was not yet a cardinal. The rules of Pius XII, which were published in 1945 (see Vatican website), ended the signatures and codes that were used in one form or another since paper ballots were first used in the 12th century to prevent anyone from casting the deciding vote for himself. The 1958 conclave was the first time in papal history where the written ballots were totally secret, containing only the name of the candidate for whom a vote was cast.

There was no ballot on the first day. Four ballots on the second day proved inconclusive. Both times, the smoke signals that reported the results of the morning and afternoon ballots appeared white at first, leading to some excited false reports that the election was over. The official responsible for arrangements outside the conclave notified the cardinals that the color of the smoke had been misread and provided them with "smoke torches from a fireworks factory". The third day's four ballots again failed to select a pope, and there was no confusion about the color of the smoke. Requests from a doctor inside the conclave for medical records suggested several cardinals were ill. It took a few ballots for supporters of Lercaro, "who was known to favor a simplified liturgy in local languages", and "the aggressively sententious" Siri to recognize they could not garner the necessary 35 votes. The deadlock that then developed between Roncalli and Agagianian led Cardinal Eugène Tisserant, the dean of the College of Cardinals, to suggest Masella as a compromise candidate without success. Roncalli later said that his name and Agagianian's "went up and down like two chickpeas in boiling water". Black smoke reported the ninth and tenth ballots were inconclusive on 28 October at 11:10 am.

Roncalli accepted his election shortly before 5 pm on 28 October, the fourth day of the conclave and the third day of balloting, and white smoke signaled his election at 5:08 pm. When asked what his name would be, he responded with his surprising choice of a name that had been avoided for centuries:

I will be called John. A name sweet to me because it is the name of my father, dear to me because it is the name of the humble parish church where I received baptism, the solemn name of numberless cathedrals scattered throughout the world, and in the first place of the most holy Lateran Church, Our Cathedral. A name that in the extremely ancient series of Roman Pontiffs has the primacy of plurality. Twenty-two Johns of indisputable legitimacy are numbered among the Supreme Pontiffs, and almost all had a brief pontificate. I have preferred to hide the smallness of my name behind this magnificent succession of Roman Pontiffs.

An antipope had once used the name John XXIII during the Western Schism in the 15th century when three men claimed to be pope, but Roncalli's mention of 22 "of indisputable legitimacy" established that he wanted to be called John XXIII. Some historians thought the question of the earlier John XXIII's legitimacy was unresolved, but Roncalli was less interested in ancient disputes than in the associations he had for the name John and a desire to break with the popes named Pius that preceded him. (Note: "[N]either the Council of Constance (1412–15) nor Pope Martin V, chosen by the Council, later wanted to decide who had been pope in the decades of the schism.") Later, he gave Cardinal Maurice Feltin of Paris another reason: "In memory of France and in the memory of John XXII, who continued the history of the papacy in France."

Following an old tradition, immediately after his election, Pope John XXIII gave his scarlet zucchetto to the secretary of the conclave, Alberto di Jorio. This indicated that John would include him when he first named cardinals. (Note: He was made a cardinal at John XXIII's first consistory in December 1958. Pius XI had done this in 1922; Pius XII had not in 1939.) Nicola Canali announced the results of the election and Roncalli's choice of name. John XXIII appeared on the balcony of St. Peter's Basilica and gave his blessing. At his request, the cardinals did not leave their enclosure but remained in the conclave overnight. He joined the cardinals for dinner that evening but did not eat. The conclave ended the next day after a Mass in the Sistine Chapel and an address by John XXIII to the cardinals, which was broadcast on radio. He set the date of his coronation for 4 November, sooner than is traditional and on Tuesday rather than on the traditional Sunday, perhaps because it was the feast of Saint Charles Borromeo, whom Roncalli had made the subject of a five-volume study. He was reported to have expressed regret that he would "never again see Venice".

Early reports said that Roncalli led in the balloting on the morning of the third day and then received almost unanimous support in that afternoon's single ballot. With the election of a 77-year-old, many churchmen interpreted the choice of Roncalli as picking a "pope of transition". John XXIII himself said, when he took possession of the Lateran Basilica on 23 November 1958: "We do not have the right to see a long way ahead of us." In early November, Pope John wrote letters to Mindszenty and Stepinac expressing regret that they were unable to participate in the conclave. On 17 November, he announced a consistory to create new cardinals on 15 December. Ignoring the longstanding maximum of 70 members, he increased the size of the College to 74 members. (Note: It would have had 75 members had not Cardinal José María Caro Rodríguez of Chile died between Pope John XXIII's announcement of new cardinals on 17 November and the consistory on 15 December.)

Balloting reported by Greeley
Ballot:	1	2	3	4	5	Final
Angelo Giuseppe Roncalli	7	7	8	15	20	38
Alfredo Ottaviani	2	5	8	16	15	9
Gregorio Pietro Agagianian	13	13	12	8	6	1
Ernesto Ruffini	17	17	15	5	5	1
Benedetto Aloisi Masella	5	6	4	3	2	1

== Conspiracy theory ==
Some Sedevacantists believed that Cardinal Siri was actually elected pope in the 1958 papal conclave on 26 October, taking the name of Gregory XVII, but his election was then suppressed, duress having been applied to him not to accept the papacy because he was a staunch anti-Communist and his election may have caused anti-Catholic turmoils in USSR-dominated Eastern Europe. This conspiracy theory is based on the fact that observers saw white smoke emitted from the Sistine Chapel prior to the final election, as reported on Vatican Radio. (referred to above). While Siri was a favourite for election before the conclave, he failed to secure enough votes once the conclave started.

== New regulations ==
John XXIII waited several years before issuing a motu proprio to modify certain aspects of the procedures for a papal conclave. In Summi Ponitificis electio, issued on 5 September 1962, he laid out additional rules for impressing all participants with the need for secrecy, even warning the cardinals about communications with their staff (paragraph XIV). His one practical modification reversed his predecessor: Pius XII had required a vote of two-thirds plus one for election; John XXIII returned the margin to two-thirds (paragraph XV).

== See also ==
Cardinal electors by region
Region	Number
Italy	17
Rest of Europe	16
North America	4
South America	9
Asia	3
Oceania	1
Africa	1
Total	51

- Cardinal electors for the 1958 conclave
