= Nicolò Cortese =

Italian Catholic priest

Venerable Nicolò Cortese O.F.M. Conv.
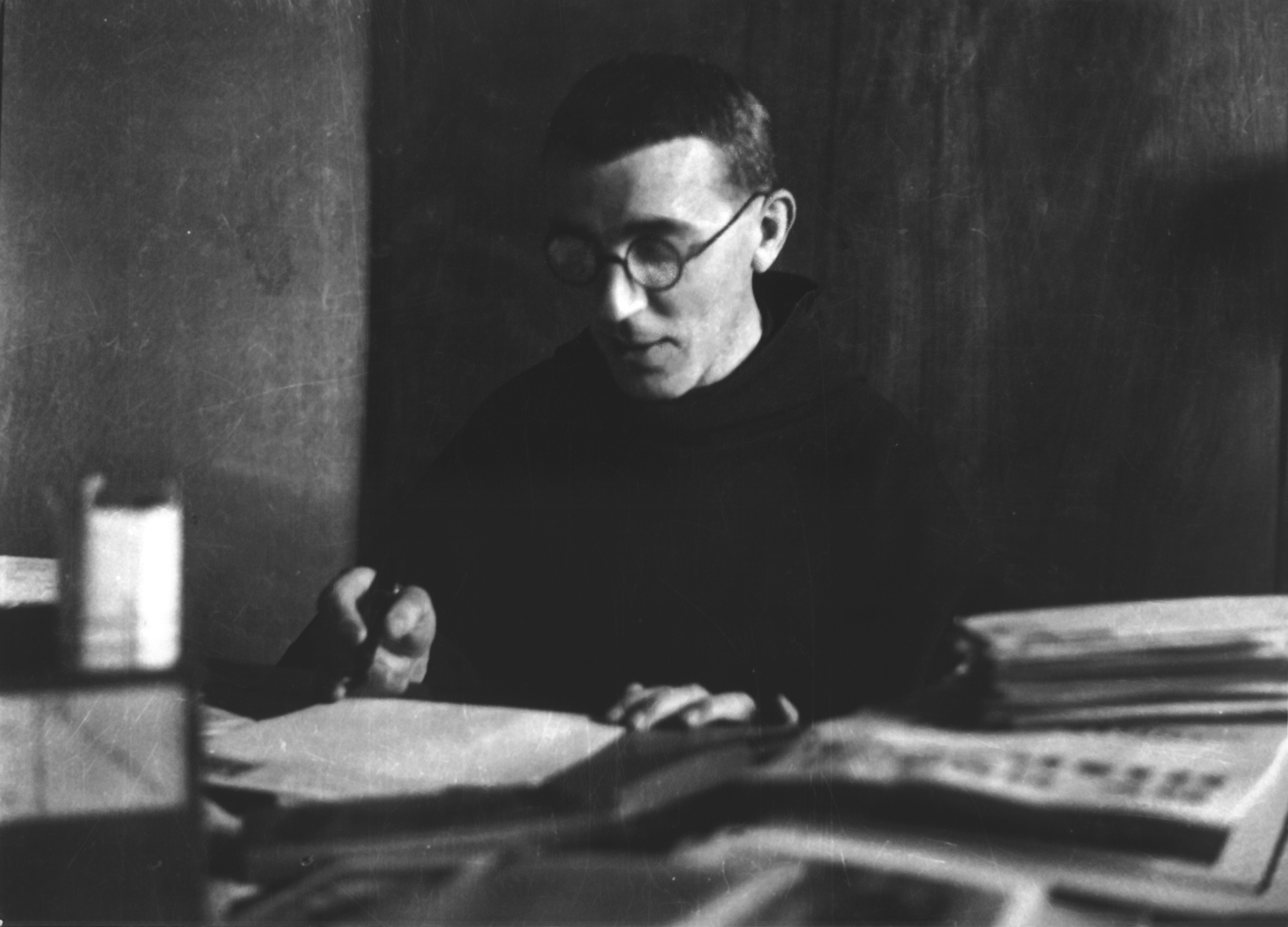
- Fr. Cortese at his desk in 1933.

Priest
- Born: 7 March 1907; Cres, Austrian Littoral, Austria-Hungary
- Died: c. 3 November 1944 (aged 37); Trieste, Italian Social Republic
- Venerated in: Catholic Church
- Attributes: Franciscan habit

Nicolò Cortese (7 March 1907 – c. 3 November 1944) - in religious Placido - was an Italian Catholic priest and professed member from the Order of Friars Minor Conventual. He served as both a parish priest and as the director for the "Il Messaggero di Sant'Antonio" magazine in Padua before and during World War II. It was in that conflict that he set up an elaborate network designed to protect Jewish people as well as British prisoners of war and Yugoslavs. But the Nazis soon discovered his plans and organized his arrest in October 1944 before killing him some weeks later after brutal tortures in their interrogations.

The process for his beatification opened in 2002 and he became titled as a Servant of God. He has also been referred to as the "Italian Father Kolbe" in reference to the saint.

== Life ==
Nicolò Cortese was born on 7 March 1907 in Cres (a town on the island with the same name) to Matteo Cortese and Antonia Battaia; he was baptized in the local parish sometime that month as Nicolò Matteo. There were four children born in total including Cortese.

He attended school in Cres until 1918 when the school closed as a result of World War I. In 1920 he entered the Order of Friars Minor Conventual and then underwent his period of novitiate in Padua at the convent in Camposampiero from October 1923 to 1924 where he assumed the religious habit. He made his solemn profession into the order on 10 October 1924. Cortese then underwent his philosophical studies at Cres from 1925 to 1927 and then in Rome for theological studies at the Saint Bonaventure pontifical college from 1927 to 1931. He was ordained to the priesthood in the Basilica of Saint John Lateran on 6 July 1930. Cortese celebrated his first Mass at the Basilica di Santa Maria Maggiore.

His first assignment after his ordination was at the Basilica di Sant'Antonio in Padua and he lived at the Immaculate Conception church at this time because the convent was still undergoing construction. This pastoral assignment lasted from 1931 to 1933 until that December when he was sent to the Viala Corsica parish in Milan for further pastoral work; this lasted until 1937. In January 1937 he was appointed as the director of the noted magazine "Il Messaggero di Sant'Antonio" and served in that role until July 1943. He was responsible during his tenure for the magazine having received 500,000 new members worldwide. The renowned Carlo Bolzonella helped him in editing and publishing several books. Cortese was keen on writing and taking photos and he often contributed to several magazine articles. He slept little and preferred to write whenever he could; he was small and thin and Bolzonella said that "Father Placido was an angel" who was "all heart".

Cortese organized several rescue missions during World War II for Jewish people as well as for British prisoners of war and Yugoslavs (prisoners in Italy). He began to do this on the personal request of Cardinal Francesco Borgongini Duca. But Cortese was bold and continued his work despite knowing that it would bring him into the path of the S.S.; he was later arrested on 13 October 1944.

The Nazis viewed Cortese as an ideological and practical militant of the Resistance who proved a great threat to them. He led this secret network from his confessional in the basilica where people would come pretending to go to confession but used coded language in order to communicate their real requests. One example is "I need five eggs": this meant that five people needed identification papers in order to get into Switzerland. Another example was "We need three kilos of flour" meaning that three people needed refuge in Padua. Gestapo spies infiltrated the Resistance and greeted Cortese outside the basilica in the afternoon at 1:55 pm and offered him a ride in their car. They took him to the Gestapo bunker in Piazza Oberdan Trieste where he was subjected to brutal tortures and interrogations with the Nazis pulling out his eyes and cutting his tongue off. Cortese was buried alive and died sometime in November; sources suggest his death occurred on 3 November though others pinpoint 15 November. His ashes were mixed with those of other victims after his remains were cremated at the Risiera di San Saba in Trieste.

In 1951 the Padua council named a street in his honour. In October 2004 a bust in his honour was unveiled at the basilica. His bronze monument stands near the Franciscan monastery on Cres.

== Beatification process ==
The beatification process opened under Pope John Paul II on 8 October 2001 after the Congregation for the Causes of Saints issued the official "nihil obstat" (no objections) edict and titled the late priest as a Servant of God. The diocesan process was opened in Trieste to determine if Cortese had been killed "in odium fidei" (in hatred of the faith) and this process lasted from 29 January 2002 until 15 November 2003. Documents from that process were submitted to the C.C.S. in Rome who validated the process on 4 June 2010.

But it was at this stage that there were doubts about whether the "in odium fidei" concept could be applied to this cause. The postulation was advised to launch another diocesan investigation to assess his virtues as opposed to the manner of his death just in case the initial case was denied and thus would result in another cause being opened. The next diocesan phase lasted from 30 July 2012 until 25 October 2012 with the C.C.S. validating the process on 17 May 2013. The postulation later submitted the Positio dossier to the C.C.S. and historians approved the virtues cause in January 2017. On 30 August 2021, Pope Francis advanced the beatification cause and titled Cortese as Venerable.

The current postulator for this cause is the Conventual Franciscan friar Damian-Gheorghe Pătraşcu.
