= Valerio Valeri =

Italian Cardinal (1883–1963)

His Eminence Valerio Valeri
- Prefect of the Congregation for Religious
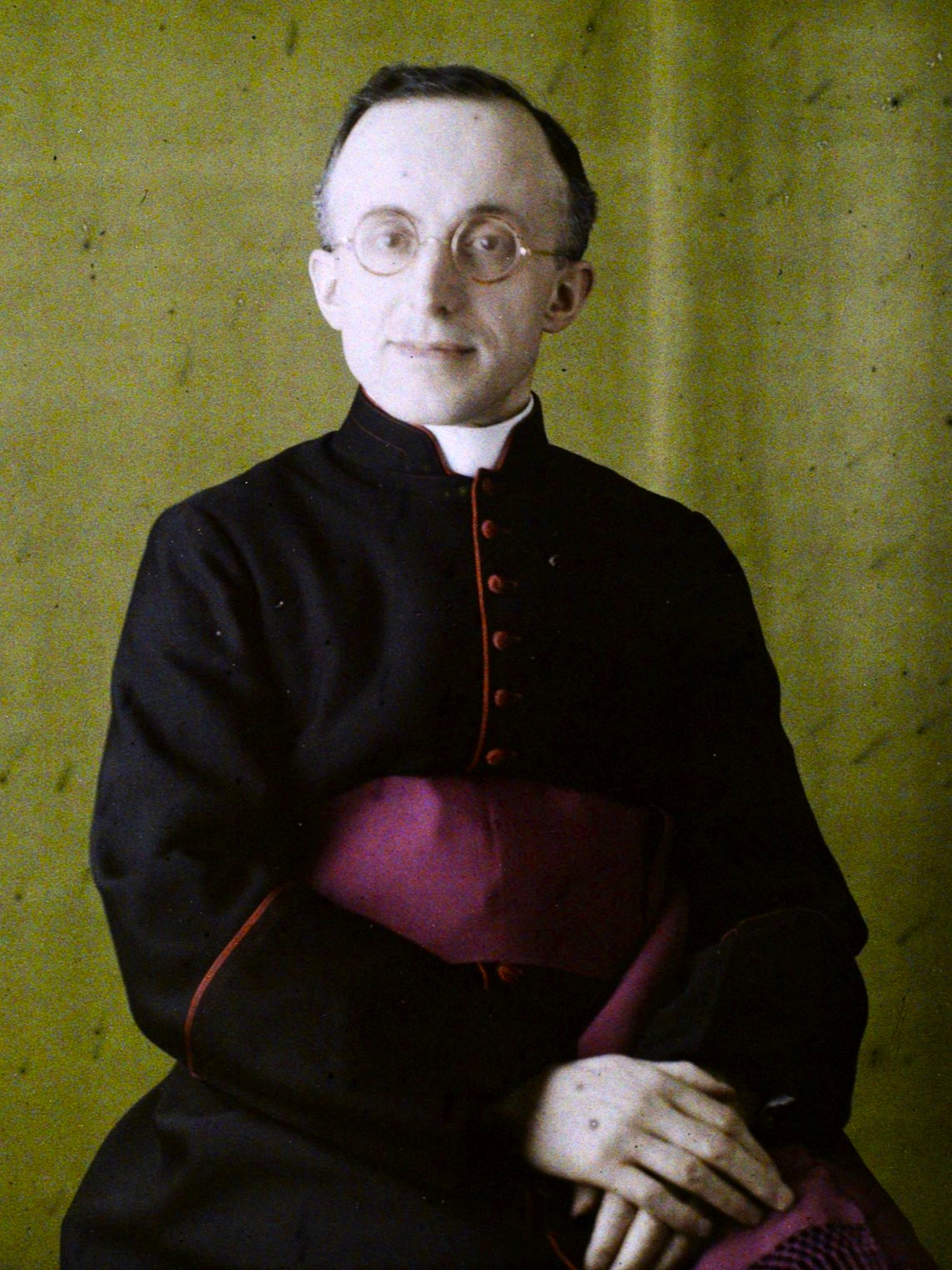
- 1927 Autochrome by Georges Chevalier
- Church: Roman Catholic Church
- Appointed: 17 January 1953
- Term ended: 22 July 1963
- Predecessor: Clemente Micara
- Successor: Ildebrando Antoniutti
- Other post: Cardinal-Priest of San Silvestro in Capite (1953–63)
- Previous posts: Apostolic Delegate to Egypt (1927–33); Apostolic Delegate to Arabia (1927–33); Apostolic Delegate to Eritrea (1927–33); Apostolic Delegate to Ethiopia (1927–33); Titular Archbishop of Ephesus (1927–53); Apostolic Nuncio to Romania (1933–36); Apostolic Nuncio to France (1936–44); Assessor of the Congregation for the Oriental Churches (1948–53)

Orders
- Ordination: 21 December 1907
- Consecration: 28 October 1927 by Donato Raffaele Sbarretti Tazza
- Created cardinal: 12 January 1953 by Pope Pius XII
- Rank: Cardinal-Priest

Personal details
- Born: Valerio Valeri; 7 November 1883 Santa Fiora, Kingdom of Italy
- Died: 22 July 1963 (aged 79) Rome, Italy
- Education: Pontifical Roman Athenaeum S. Apollinare
- Motto: Pax in virtute
- Coat of arms

Styles of Valerio Valeri
- Reference style: His Eminence
- Spoken style: Your Eminence
- Informal style: Cardinal
- See: none

Valerio Valeri (7 November 1883 – 22 July 1963) was an Italian Cardinal of the Catholic Church. He served as Prefect of the Sacred Congregation for Religious in the Roman Curia from 1953 until his death, and was elevated to the cardinalate in 1953 by Pope Pius XII.

President Charles de Gaulle insisted that Valeri be removed as Apostolic Nuncio to France (1936-1944) for collaborating with the Vichy regime.

== Biography ==
Valerio Valeri was born in Santa Fiora, and studied at the Roman-Pio Seminary and the Pontifical Roman Athenaeum S. Apollinare, where he was made a professor in 1904. Ordained to the priesthood on 21 December 1907, he then taught at the Pontifical Regional Seminary in Fano until 1909. After serving as a military chaplain during World War I, Valeri entered the Roman Curia, as a staff member of the Secretariat of State, in 1920. From 1921 to 1927, he was auditor of the French nunciature. He was raised to the rank of Privy Chamberlain of His Holiness on 6 July 1921, and later Domestic Prelate of His Holiness on 22 July 1923.

On 18 October 1927, Valeri was appointed Titular Archbishop of Ephesus and Apostolic Delegate to Egypt and Arabia. He received his episcopal consecration on the following 28 October from Cardinal Donato Sbarretti, with Archbishop Pietro Benedetti, MSC, and Bishop Giuseppe Angelucci serving as co-consecrators. Valeri was later named Nuncio to Romania on 1 July 1933, and finally Apostolic Nuncio to France on 11 July 1936. In August 1942, the nuncio disputed Marshal Pétain's claim that Pope Pius XII understood and approved of France's increased hostility towards the Jews. He was awarded the Grand Cross of the Légion d'honneur upon leaving France in 1944 to again work in the Secretariat of State, specifically the Congregation for Extraordinary Ecclesiastical Affairs. After becoming President of the Central Committee for the Holy Year on 28 June 1948, Archbishop Valeri was made assessor of the Sacred Congregation for the Oriental Churches on 1 September of that same year.

He was created Cardinal-Priest of S. Silvestro in Capite by Pius XII in the consistory of 12 January 1953. Pope Pius advanced him to Prefect of the Sacred Congregation for Religious five days later, on 17 January. Cardinal Valeri was one of the cardinal electors who participated in the 1958 papal conclave that selected Pope John XXIII, who had earlier succeeded him as the French nuncio. Cardinal Valeri lived long enough to only attend the first session of the Second Vatican Council in 1962, and to participate in the conclave of 1963, which resulted in the election of Pope Paul VI.

Valeri died in Rome, at age 79. He is buried in his family's tomb in Santa Fiora.

Catholic Church titles
Preceded by Andrea Cassulo	Apostolic Delegate to Egypt and Arabia; 1927–1933	Succeeded by Gustavo Testa
Preceded by Angelo Dolci	Nuncio to Romania; 1933–1936	Succeeded by Andrea Cassulo
Preceded by Luigi Maglione	Apostolic Nuncio to France; 1936–1944	Succeeded by Angelo Roncalli
Preceded by Clemente Micara	Prefect of the Sacred Congregation for Religious; 1953–1963	Succeeded by Ildebrando Antoniutti
Preceded by Luigi Lavitrano	Cardinal-Priest of S. Silvestro in Capite; 1953–1963	Succeeded by John Carmel Heenan
