= Carlo Agostini =

Italian prelate (1888–1952)

The Most Reverend Carlo Agostini
- Patriarch of Venice
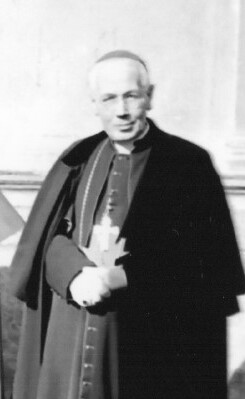
- Photograph by Placido Cortese, 1938
- Church: Roman Catholic Church
- Archdiocese: Venice
- See: Venice
- Appointed: 5 February 1949
- Term ended: 28 December 1952
- Predecessor: Adeodato Giovanni Piazza
- Successor: Angelo Giuseppe Roncalli
- Previous post: Bishop of Padua (1932-49)

Orders
- Ordination: 24 September 1910 by Andrea Giacinto Bonaventura Longhin
- Consecration: 10 April 1932 by Andrea Giacinto Bonaventura Longhin

Personal details
- Born: Carlo Agostini; 22 April 1888 San Martino di Lupari, Kingdom of Italy
- Died: 28 December 1952 (aged 64) Venice, Italy
- Buried: Saint Mark's Basilica (since 1957)
- Education: Pontifical University of Saint Thomas Aquinas; Pontifical Gregorian University

Styles of Carlo Agostini
- Reference style: The Most Reverend
- Spoken style: Your Excellency
- Religious style: Monsignor

Carlo Agostini (22 April 1888 – 28 December 1952) was an Italian prelate of the Catholic Church. He served as Patriarch of Venice from 1949 until his death, and died shortly after the announcement for his elevation to the cardinalate in 1952.

== Biography ==
Born in San Martino di Lupari, Carlo Agostini studied at the seminary in Treviso, and was ordained to the priesthood by Bishop Andrea Longhin on 24 September 1910. He then furthered his studies in Rome earning a doctorate in philosophy at the Pontifical University of St. Thomas Aquinas (Angelicum) and a doctorate in theology at Pontifical Gregorian University in 1913. Agostini was a professor (1913–1925) and the rector (1925–1932) of the Treviso seminary, and was raised to the rank of privy chamberlain of his holiness in 1925.

On 30 January 1932, he was appointed Bishop of Padua by Pope Pius XI. Agostini received his episcopal consecration on the following 10 April from Bishop Longhin, with Archbishop Elia Dalla Costa and Bishop Eugenio Beccegato serving as co-consecrators. He was apostolic administrator of Treviso from 8 March to 6 December 1936, and later named Patriarch of Venice on 5 February 1949.

Pope Pius XII announced on 29 November 1952 that he would elevate Agostini and twenty-three others to the College of Cardinals. However, the patriarch died, from Parkinson's disease at the age of 64, before the consistory could take place on 12 January 1953. Agostini was initially buried in S. Michele cemetery, but his remains were later transferred to the crypt of St Mark's Basilica in November 1957.

The unexpected vacancy in Venice opened the way for the elevation of Angelo Giuseppe Roncalli, the future Pope John XXIII.

Catholic Church titles
Preceded by Adeodato Giovanni Piazza	Patriarch of Venice; 1949–1952	Succeeded by Angelo Giuseppe Roncalli
