= Ernesto Ruffini =

Italian cardinal

His Eminence Ernesto Ruffini
- Cardinal, Archbishop of Palermo
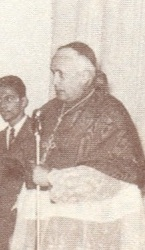
- Church: Roman Catholic Church
- Archdiocese: Palermo
- See: Palermo
- Appointed: 11 October 1945
- Term ended: 11 June 1967
- Predecessor: Luigi Lavitrano
- Successor: Francesco Carpino
- Other posts: Cardinal-Priest of Santa Sabina (1946-67); Apostolic Administrator of Piana degli Albanesi (1947-67)
- Previous posts: Secretary of the Congregation of Seminaries and Universities (1928-45)

Orders
- Ordination: 10 July 1910 by Paolo Carlo Francesco Origo
- Consecration: 8 December 1945 by Giuseppe Pizzardo
- Created cardinal: 18 February 1946 by Pope Pius XII
- Rank: Cardinal-Priest

Personal details
- Born: Ernesto Ruffini; 19 January 1888 San Benedetto Po, Kingdom of Italy
- Died: 11 June 1967 (aged 79) Palermo, Italy
- Motto: Firmiter stat
- Coat of arms

Styles of Ernesto Ruffini
- Reference style: His Eminence
- Spoken style: Your Eminence
- Informal style: Cardinal
- See: Palermo

Ernesto Ruffini (19 January 1888 – 11 June 1967) was an Italian cardinal of the Catholic Church, who served as Archbishop of Palermo from 1945 until his death, and was elevated to the cardinalate in 1946 by Pope Pius XII.

== Biography ==
Ruffini was born in San Benedetto Po in the Province of Mantua, and studied at the diocesan seminary of Mantua, at the Pontifical Theological Faculty of Northern Italy (obtaining his licentiate in theology), and the Pontifical University of St. Thomas Aquinas (Angelicum) (licentiate in philosophy) and Pontifical Biblical Institute (diploma to teach biblical science) in Rome. He was ordained to the priesthood on 10 July 1910, and finished his studies in 1912.

Ruffini taught at the Major Roman Seminary (1913–1930), and then the Pontifical Urbaniana University (1917–1929). Raised to the rank of monsignor in 1925, he was appointed secretary of the Congregation of Seminaries and Universities on 28 October 1928. Ruffini was made a protonotary apostolic on 15 June 1931. In 1930, Ruffini was made prefect of studies at the Pontifical Lateran University, where he was named rector magnifico in the following year. Noted for his interest in science, Ruffini founded the Medical Biological Union of St. Luke, examining the relationships between Catholicism and science, in 1944.

On 11 October 1945, he was named Archbishop of Palermo by Pope Pius XII. Ruffini received his episcopal consecration on the following 8 December from Giuseppe Cardinal Pizzardo, with Archbishop Francesco Duca and Bishop Domenico Menna serving as co-consecrators. Ruffini was created Cardinal-Priest of S. Sabina by Pius XII in the consistory of 18 February 1946. He was the first cardinal-designate to place his wardrobe order to the Gammarelli episcopal tailors, which he did the same morning as the announcement of his elevation to the Sacred College. He later participated in the 1958 papal conclave, which selected Pope John XXIII. Cardinal Ruffini was also among the papabili at that conclave.

During his tenure as Palermo's archbishop, he supported Francisco Franco, but protested against communism and anti-Mafia activist Danilo Dolci. He also demanded that the Sicilian bandit Salvatore Giuliano cease murdering within Palermo, and was wary of implying that the Mafia was Sicily's main problem. To a journalist's question of "What is the Mafia?" he responded: "So far as I know, it could be a brand of detergent."

A stern opponent of reform, he attended the Second Vatican Council (1962–1965), and sat on its Board of Presidency. Ruffini was also part of the conservative-minded study group Coetus Internationalis Patrum at the council. He was forced to intervene in a heated discussion between Cardinals Alfredo Ottaviani and Augustin Bea during the last preparatory session of the Council. During the discussion on the Council's proposed declaration against anti-Semitism, Cardinal Ruffini accused the document of being overly kind to the Jews, whom he saw as hostile to Christianity. He also disapproved of Gaudium et spes, Sacrosanctum Concilium, and Dignitatis humanae.

Cardinal Ruffini was one of the cardinal electors who participated in the 1963 papal conclave, which selected Pope Paul VI.

He died of a heart attack in Palermo, at the age of 79. Ruffini is buried in the shrine of Madonna dei Rimedi.

== Miscellaneous ==
- While still a priest, Ruffini also served as president of the Academy of the Immaculate Conception of the Blessed Virgin Mary.
- He collaborated with John XXIII in deciding to convene the Second Vatican Council.
- Ruffini was a creationist.

== Publications ==
- The Theory of Evolution Judged by Reason and Faith (Translated by Rev. Francis O'Hanlon, 1959)

Catholic Church titles
Preceded by Luigi Cardinal Lavitrano	Archbishop of Palermo; 1945–1967	Succeeded by Francesco Cardinal Carpino
