= Clemente Micara =

Catholic cardinal

His Eminence Clemente Micara
- Vicar General of Rome
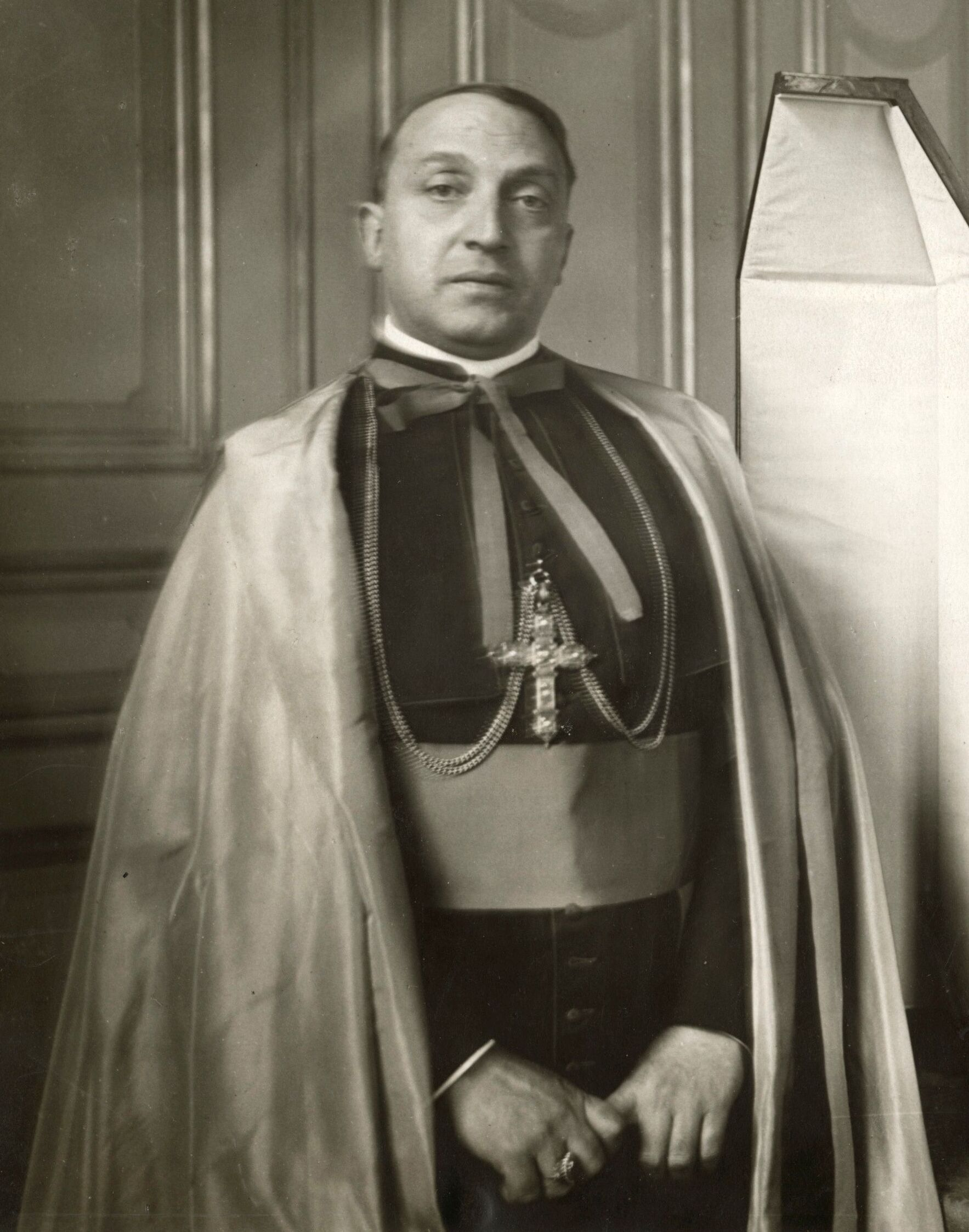
- Church: Roman Catholic Church
- Appointed: 26 January 1951
- Term ended: 11 March 1965
- Predecessor: Francesco Marchetti Selvaggiani
- Successor: Luigi Traglia
- Other posts: Cardinal-Priest of Santa Maria sopra Minerva in commendum (1946–65); Cardinal-Bishop of Velletri (1946–65); President of the Pontifical Commission for Sacred Archaeology (1951–65); Vice-Dean of the College of Cardinals (1951–65); Apostolic Administrator of Ostia (1962–65)
- Previous posts: Apostolic Nuncio to Czechoslovakia (1920–23); Titular Archbishop of Aparnea in Syria (1920–46); Apostolic Nuncio to Belgium (1923–46); Apostolic Internuncio to Luxembourg (1923–46); Prefect of the Congregation for Religious (1950–53); Pro-Prefect of the Congregation for Rites (1950–53); Camerlengo of the College of Cardinals (1960–61)

Orders
- Ordination: 20 September 1902
- Consecration: 8 August 1920 by Pietro Gasparri
- Created cardinal: 18 February 1946 by Pope Pius XII
- Rank: Cardinal-priest (1946); Cardinal-bishop (1946–65)

Personal details
- Born: Clemente Micara; 24 December 1879 Frascati, Kingdom of Italy
- Died: 11 March 1965 (aged 85) Rome, Italy
- Buried: Santa Maria sopra Minerva
- Education: Pontifical Roman Seminary; Pontifical Gregorian University; Pontifical Lateran University; Pontifical Ecclesiastical Academy
- Motto: In Domino confido
- Coat of arms

Styles of Clemente Micara
- Reference style: His Eminence
- Spoken style: Your Eminence
- Informal style: Cardinal
- See: Velletri-Segni (suburbicarain)

Clemente Micara (24 December 1879 – 11 March 1965) was an Italian prelate of the Roman Catholic Church. He worked in the diplomatic service of the Holy See from 1909 to 1950 and was Vicar General of Rome from 1951 until his death.

Pope Pius XII made him a cardinal in 1946.

== Biography ==
Born in Frascati, Micara attended the Pontifical Roman Seminary, the Pontifical Gregorian University, the Pontifical Lateran University, and the Pontifical Ecclesiastical Academy. He was ordained to the priesthood on 20 September 1902, and finished his studies in 1904. After entering the Roman Curia, in the Secretariat of State, in 1904, Micara was named secretary of the nunciature to Argentina in 1909. He was raised to the rank of Privy Chamberlain of His Holiness on 5 January 1910, and later Domestic Prelate of His Holiness on 21 August 1918. Micara was made auditor of the Belgian nunciature on 16 April 1915, and of the Austrian nunciature in 1916.

On 7 May 1920, he was appointed by Pope Benedict XV as the first Nuncio to Czechoslovakia and Titular Archbishop of Apamea in Syria. He received his episcopal consecration on the following 8 August from Cardinal Pietro Gasparri, with Bishops Antonio Valbonesi and Karl Kašpar serving as co-consecrators, in the chapel of the Bohemian College in Rome.

The new Czechoslovak government demanded that the majority of incumbent bishops be replaced and systematically implemented a persecutory anti-church policy. Due to this imposition, Pavel Huyn, Primate and Archbishop of Prague, Cardinal Lev Skrbenský z Hříště, Archbishop of Olomouc, and at least other six bishops had been replaced or forced out to resign. After 1921, only two pre-war bishops were allowed to remain. Another problem was the fact that hundreds of Catholic places of worship were seized by the government and assigned to the new Czechoslovak Hussite Church with an openly anti-Catholic purpose.

After being named Nuncio to Belgium and Internuncio to Luxembourg on 30 May 1923, Micara bestowed the Golden Rose on Queen Elizabeth of Belgium as a papal representative on 10 December 1925. He resided in Rome during the Nazi occupation of Belgium from 1940 to 1944, at which time the nuncio resumed his post.

Pope Pius XII named Micara Cardinal-Priest of Santa Maria sopra Minerva in the consistory of 18 February 1946, and then Bishop of Velletri-Segni on 13 June. On 11 November 1950, he was made Prefect of the Sacred Congregation of Religious, and Pro-Prefect of the Sacred Congregation of Rites in the Roman Curia. In 1953, he resigned as Prefect of Religious (17 January) and Pro-Prefect of Rites (26 January). Micara was also President of the Pontifical Commission for Sacred Archaeology from 1951 until his death.

Micara was appointed Vice-Dean of the College of Cardinals on 13 January 1951 and Vicar General of Rome on the following 26 January. As Vicar General, Micara governed the Diocese of Rome on behalf of the Pope, the Bishop of Rome. Ahead of the 1953 Italian general election, Micara urged the Catholics of Rome to "[v]ote well, vote as Catholics, vote as Romans".

He served as a cardinal elector in the 1958 papal conclave that elected Pope John XXIII, and voted in the conclave of 1963 that elected Pope Paul VI. He was called the "Grand Elector" among the Curia because of his influential role in securing the votes of conservative cardinals' for Pope Paul, with whom he was friends, in the latter conclave. In 1959, John XXIII paid tribute to his work in his speech announcing the proposed Second Vatican Council. Seen as a progressive, the Cardinal attended the first three of the four sessions of the Council in 1962, 1963 and 1964.

He died in Rome on 11 March 1965 after a long illness, at age 85, and was buried in the basilica of Santa Maria sopra Minerva.

== Connection to Marcial Maciel case ==
According to the documentary "Marcial Maciel: El Lobo de Dios" (Marcial Maciel: The Wolf of God), a claim is made that in 1958 the cardinal was allegedly paid $10,000 to reinstate Marcial Maciel's as the head of the Legionaries of Christ.

== Honours ==
- 1924: Grand Cross of the Order of the White Lion
- 1925: Grand Cordon Order of Leopold.

Catholic Church titles
Preceded by none	Apostolic Nuncio to Czechoslovakia; 1920–1923	Succeeded by Francesco Marmaggi
Preceded by Angelo Dolci	Apostolic Nuncio to Belgium; 1923–1950	Succeeded by Fernando Cento
Preceded by Achille Locatelli	Internuncio to Luxembourg; 1923–1946	Succeeded by Fernando Cento
Preceded by Carlo Salotti	Pro-Prefect of the Sacred Congregation of Rites; 1950–1953	Succeeded by Gaetano Cicognani
Preceded by Luigi Lavitrano	Prefect of the Sacred Congregation of Religious; 1950–1953	Succeeded by Valerio Valeri
Preceded by Francesco Marchetti-Selvaggiani	Vicar General of Rome; 1951–1965	Succeeded by Luigi Traglia
Preceded by Francesco Marchetti-Selvaggiani	President of the Pontifical Commission for Sacred Archaeology; 1951–1965	Succeeded by Cesario D’Amato, OSB
