= Cardinal protector =

Roman Catholic Church title confirmed upon a particular Cardinal

Since the thirteenth century it has been customary for the pope to assign to a particular prelate, and since 1420 to one with the rank of cardinal, a special responsibility in the Roman Curia for the interests of a given religious order or institute, confraternity, church, college, city, nation, etc. Such a person is known as a "cardinal protector". He was its representative or spokesman (orator) when it sought a favor or a privilege, defended it when unjustly accused, and sought the aid of the Holy See when its rights, property or interests were violated or imperiled. The cardinal protector was a position with an extensive juridical responsibility that gave the cardinal ample powers.

== Antecedents ==
In ancient Rome a similar relationship had existed between the client (cliens) and his patronus (hence 'patron'); as Rome's power grew, a still closer analogy is visible between the Roman institution and the modern ecclesiastical protectorate. Nearly every provincial city had its patronus, or procurator, in imperial Rome, usually a Roman patrician or eques, and such persons were held in high esteem. Thus Cicero was patronus of Dyrrachium (later Durazzo, now Durrës) and of Capua, in which Campanian city a gilded statue was raised to him. In time the office became hereditary in certain families; Suetonius wrote, in his life of Tiberius, that the imperial Claudian family (gens Claudia) was from ancient times protector of Sicily and the Peloponnesus.

== Titular churches ==
Every cardinal (except the Cardinal-Patriarchs) is also, since the reign of John Paul II, called the Cardinal protector of the title (titular church s.s. for a Cardinal priest or Cardinal-deaconry for a Cardinal deacon) in or near Rome to which he is assigned, which gives him his title and benefits from his material support for upkeep or restoration, especially when he is the ordinary of a wealthy see.

== Cardinal protectors of religious orders ==
The Roman Church adopted this, with many other imperial institutions, as one serviceable for external administration, not that the popes who first conferred this office and title sought to copy an ancient Roman usage, but because analogous conditions and circumstances created a similar situation. The office is conferred by the pope through the Cardinal secretary of state, sometimes by spontaneous designation of the Pope, sometimes at the request of those who seek such protection. Such a cardinal protector had the right to place his coat-of-arms on the church or main edifice of the institute, or on the municipal palace of the city in question. In the early modern period, a portrait of the cardinal protector was often on display in the premises of the institution.

The first to hold such an office was Cardinal Ugolino Conti (later Pope Gregory IX), who sought thereby to paralyze the intrigues of his many enemies at Rome; at the request of St. Francis himself, he was named protector of the Franciscans by Pope Innocent III, and again by Honorius III. Alexander IV and Nicholas III retained for themselves the office of protector of the Franciscans. Indeed, the latter were long the only order that could boast of a cardinal protector; it was only in the fourteenth century that gradually the office was extended. As early as 1370 Pope Gregory XI was obliged to restrain the abuses committed by the cardinal protector of the Franciscans; Pope Martin V (1417–31) forbade the acceptance by the protector of a religious order of any payment for his protection. While Sixtus IV and Julius II defined more particularly the limits of the office, Pope Innocent XII (1691–1700) must be credited with a lasting regulation of the duties and rights of a cardinal protector.

== Cardinal protectors of monarchs, states, and regional churches ==
Cardinals could also act as representatives of foreign rulers, even though this was always regarded with suspicion by the pope, since it created contrasting loyalties. The earliest known example of a cardinal protector occurs in correspondence between Pope Urban V and King Louis of Hungary (1342–1382), in which Cardinal Guillaume de Jugié has entered into a mutual agreement with King Louis to protect (promote) each other's interests.

Emperors, kings, and other dignitaries, were permitted to have cardinal protectors, until Pope Urban VI (1378–89) forbade such cardinals to receive anything from the respective sovereigns of these states, lest through love of money they should be led to abet works of injustice. In 1424 Pope Martin V forbade the cardinals to accept the protectorate of kings and princes. Pope Eugenius IV, in his instructions to Cardinal Giulio Cesarini, his legate and president of the Council of Basel, wrote that cardinals should not be protectors of lords or communities. And in March 1436, the council duly decreed: "And as the cardinals should assist him who is the common father of all [the pope], it is highly improper for them to make distinctions between persons or to become their advocates. Therefore this Holy Synod decrees forbids them, as co-judges, to represent any particular interest even if they themselves come from the country concerned. And they should not be partial protectors or defenders of any prince or community or anybody else against anybody, with or without payment. But freed of all passion, they should assist the pope in settling conflicts through concord and justice. But this Holy Synod encourages them to promote the just affairs of princes and all others, especially the poor and the religious orders, without payment and profit, but purely as a work of charity.” Cardinals, therefore, could not be Protectors, but they could be Promoters. The door had been reopened a crack. The prohibition was renewed in 1492 by Pope Alexander VI.

Cardinal Francesco Todeschini-Piccolomini, the nephew of Pope Pius II, served as the protector of England at the Roman Curia from 1492 to 1503, He also served as Protector of Germany.

Cardinal Marco Vigerio was Protector of King Christian I of Denmark and the Danish nation, ca. 1513–1516.

On 5 May 1514, in the ninth session of the Lateran Council, Pope Leo X promulgated his bull, "Supernae dispositionis", extensively reforming the Roman Curia. A lengthy section addressed the position and functions of cardinals. Leo points out that cardinals give assistance to the common Father of all Christian faithful, and that advocates of individuals are an annoyance. He therefore orders that cardinals should not take up any position of partiality, either of princes or communities, or of other people against some one person, nor should they become promoters or defenders unless some point of justice or equity demands it, or their own dignity and condition requires it. They should separate themselves from every private passion. The just business of princes and other persons, and especially the poor and religious persons should move them with pious feeling, and they should help the oppressed and unjustly harassed according to their abilities and the obligation of their office. A great deal of maneuvering space was left for the cardinalatial conscience and ingenuity by the "unless" clause. No mention of annuities, subsidies, or anything financial is made.

Until the Portuguese Revolution of 1910, the Kingdom of Portugal was the only state with a cardinal protector.

== Roman curia ==
Within the Roman curia, a cardinal is appointed as protector of the Pontifical Ecclesiastical Academy, which trains papal diplomats.

== See also ==
- Cardinal protector of England
- Cardinal-Infante (disambiguation)
- Cardinal-nephew
- Crown cardinal
- Lay cardinal

== Bibliography ==
- Piatti, Girolamo (Hieronymus Platius), Tractatus de cardinalis dignitate et officio 4th edition edited by Giovanni Andrea Tria (Rome, 1746), pp. 423–436.
- Humphrey, William, SJ, Urbis et Orbis: Or, The Pope as Bishop and as Pontiff (London: Thomas Baker 1899).
- Wodka, Josef (1938). Zur Geschichte der nationalen Protektorate der Kardinäle an der römischen Kurie (Innsbruck-Leipzig 1938).
- Wicki, J. (1959). "Rodolfo Pio da Carpi, erster und einziger Kardinalprotektor der Gesellschaft Jesu," Miscellanea Historiae Pontificiae (Rome, 1959), pp. 243–267.
- Forte, Stephen L. Cardinal-Protector of the Dominican Order (Roma 1959).
- Poncet, Olivier (2002), "The Cardinal-Protectors of the Crowns in the Roman Curia during the first half of the Seventeenth Century: The Case of France," Gianvittorio Signorotto and Maria Antonietta Visceglia, ed. (2002). Court and Politics in Papal Rome, 1492–1700. Cambridge: Cambridge University Press. ISBN 978-1-139-43141-5., pp. 158–176.
- Faber, Martin (2004), "Gubernator, protector et corrector. Zum Zusammenhang der Entstehung von Orden und Kardinalprotektoren von Orden in der lateinischen Kirche," Zeitschrift für Kirchengeschichte 115 (2004) 19-44.
- Walsh, Katherine (1974). "The Beginnings of a National Protectorate: Curial Cardinals and the Irish Church in the Fifteenth Century". Archivium Hibernicum. 32: 72–80. doi:10.2307/25529601. JSTOR 25529601.
- Cotta-Schønberg, Michael (2012). "Cardinal Enea Silvio Piccolomini and the Development of Cardinal Protectors of Nations." Fund og Forskning i Det Kongelige Biblioteks Samlinger, 51, pp. 49–76.
- Witte, Arnold (2020). "Cardinal Protectors of Religious Institutions", in Mary Hollingsworth, Miles Pattenden and Arnold Witte, eds. A Companion to the Early Modern Cardinal. Leiden/Boston: Brill, pp. 124–143.
- Marceau, Bertrand (2020). "Cardinal Protectors and National Interests", in Mary Hollingsworth, Miles Pattenden and Arnold Witte, eds. A Companion to the Early Modern Cardinal. Leiden/Boston: Brill, pp. 198–210.
