= Subdeacon =

Ministry in the Christian Church

Subdeacon is a ministry in various branches of Christianity. The subdeacon has a specific liturgical role and is placed below the deacon and above the acolyte in the order of precedence.

== Eastern Orthodox Church ==
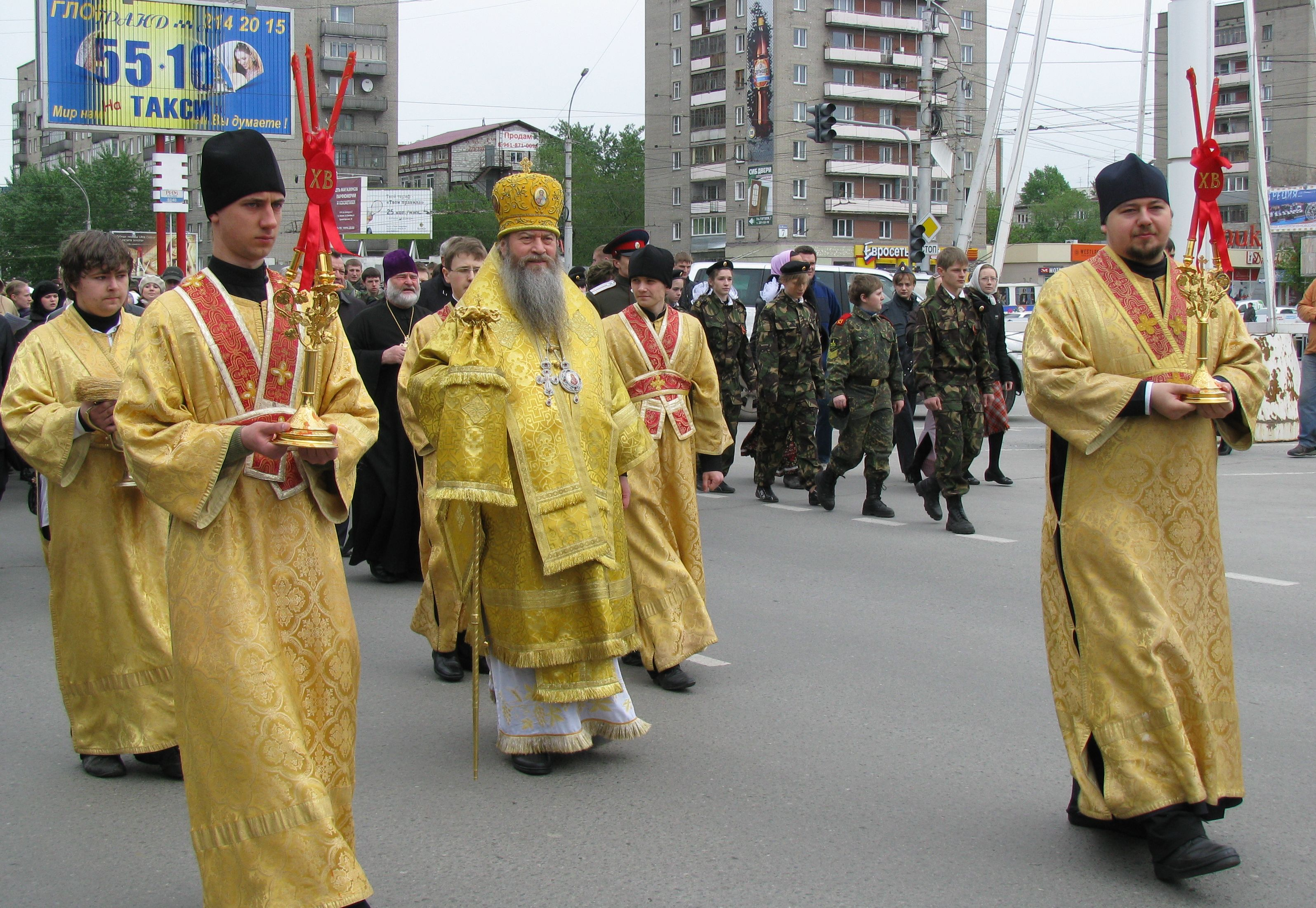
Russian Orthodox subdeacons (red stoles) surrounding a bishop, 2009

A subdeacon, also called hypodeacon, is the highest of the minor orders of clergy in the Eastern Orthodox Church. This order is higher than the reader and lower than the deacon.

=== Canonical discipline ===
Like the reader, the clerical street-dress of the subdeacon is the cassock, which is usually black but only need be so if he is a monk. This is symbolic of their suppression of their own tastes, will, and desires, and their canonical obedience to God, their bishop, and the liturgical and canonical norms of the Church. In countries where Eastern Orthodoxy is little known, many only wear the cassock when attending liturgies or when moving about the faithful on church business. In some jurisdictions in the United States, a clergy-shirt will sometimes be worn instead of a cassock, and is commonly worn buttoned but with no collar or collar-tab to indicate a rank lower than deacon.

There is a special liturgy for the tonsuring of a subdeacon, although in contemporary practice an acolyte or a reader may receive the bishop's blessing to vest and act as a subdeacon generally or for a particular occasion if there is no subdeacon available. This situation often arises if there is a need for a subdeacon and a likely candidate has stated an intention to marry but has not yet done so, causing a delay in their ordination. The reason for this lies in the fact that the canons prohibit subdeacons to marry after their ordination (just like deacons and priests). This latter stipulation has led, in some places, to the reservation of the formal ordination liturgy as a stepping-stone for candidates for the priesthood, although this is by no means universal. It also means that, while teenagers who show particular fervour may be ordained as acolytes and readers, the subdiaconate is usually reserved for those of more mature years; the canonical minimum age for subdiaconal ordination is twenty years.

A custom in some jurisdictions is that former seminarians who have discerned not to have a calling to the priesthood or diaconate, are, if they wish (and provided that they are married, or being unmarried, do not intend to marry), ordained subdeacons as a sign of investment, faith, and to award their service.

=== Function, vesture, and ordination ===
==== Byzantine Rite ====
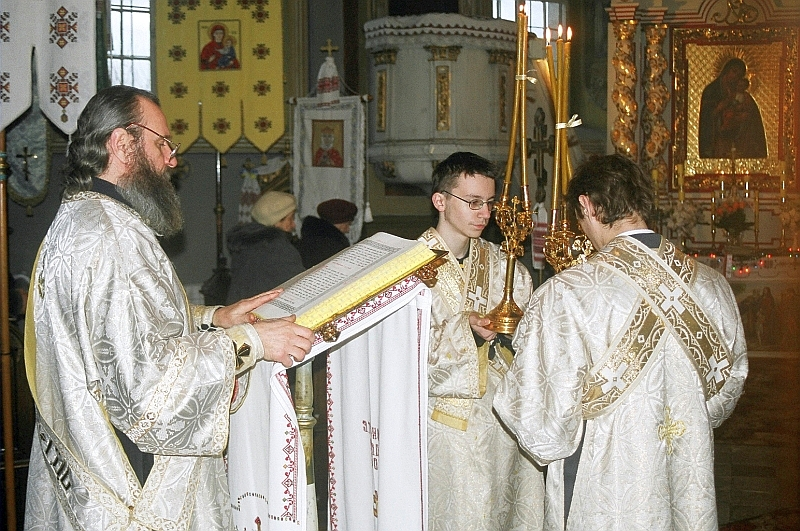
Subdeacons holding the episcopal candles while deacon reads the Gospel

In the Byzantine Rite (followed by the majority of Eastern Orthodox churches) the subdeacon's liturgical role is primarily that of servant to the bishop. They assist the bishop during hierarchical liturgies, (at which a hierarch/bishop is present and presiding) by vesting them, by looking after and presenting the trikiri and dikiri, placing the aëtos, operating the veil and Royal Doors, and handing the bishop and relieving them of all that they need so as to enable them to perform their role of prayer undistracted. Outside of hierarchical liturgies, the subdeacon serves in the altar as any other server but, as highest-ranking of the minor clergy, is responsible for co-ordinating and leading the serving team. In addition to the above duties, the subdeacon may read the reading from the Epistle at the Divine Liturgy if there is only one deacon. The subdeacon also has practical responsibilities in the care of the altar, by cleaning it, looking after the clergy vestments and the cloths of the Holy Table, cleaning and mending them, and changing them according to the feasts, fasts, and seasons. For this reason, they have a general blessing to touch the Holy Table and the Table of Oblation, which Readers and other servers may not do. They are also responsible for the training of new servers.

The clerical street-wear of a subdeacon is the inner-cassock (podryasnik) and outer cassock (ryasa). Many wear the cassock only when present among the church community or attending to church business.

For liturgies, the subdeacon is vested in a sticharion with an orarion tied around their waist, up over their shoulders (forming a cross in back), and with the ends crossed over, and tucked under the section around the waist. This distinguishes them from acolytes in those jurisdictions where acolytes are ordained and blessed to wear the orarion, as the latter do not wear the orarion crossed in front but simply hanging straight down.

The ordination to the subdiaconate is performed outside of the altar and in a context other than the Divine Liturgy. The reader who is to be tonsured subdeacon is presented to the bishop by two other subdeacons, who first lead them to the nave. There they face east and makes a prostration before turning to make three prostrations towards the bishop, moving further west after each one. They are then led to stand immediately before the bishop. The subdeacons present the orarion to the bishop, who blesses it. The ordinand then kisses the orarion and the bishop's hand, and the subdeacons vest the ordinand in the orarion.

The bishop blesses the ordinand three times with the sign of the Cross upon his head, then lays his right hand upon the ordinand's head and prays the prayer of ordination. The new subdeacon kisses the bishop's right hand and makes a prostration before the bishop, after which the more senior subdeacons drape a towel over his shoulders and present him with a ewer and basin, with which he washes the bishop's hands after the usual manner. The bishop dries his hands and the three subdeacons receive the bishop's blessing and kiss his hands.

The senior subdeacons return to the altar while the new subdeacon, still holding the ewer and basin, stands on the soleas, facing the icon of the Mother of God and saying particular prayers quietly. The Sixth Hour is completed and the Divine Liturgy continues as usual. The subdeacon remains on the soleas until the Cherubikon, when they and two senior subdeacons wash the bishop's hands as usual.

At the Great Entrance, the new subdeacon joins on the very end of the procession, carrying the ewer and basin and, after the commemorations, takes the blessed water to the people so that they may bless themselves with it.

On occasions when there is a shortage of altar servers, the newly ordained subdeacon may be required to serve at the Liturgy, in which case the taking of the blessed water to the people may be omitted, and he may be asked not to stay on the soleas but rather to assist with serving duties in the altar and at the entrances.

==== Western Rite ====
In the Western Rite, the subdeacon's role was essentially as an assistant to the deacon in performing their diaconal role. This perhaps more clearly reflects the origins of the subdiaconate than in the Byzantine Rite, where, rather than the subdeacon assisting the deacon, many formerly diaconal functions have, over time, come to be seen as properly belonging to the subdeacon in their own right. In the Western Rite, the subdeacon was charged with reading the epistle at a High Mass (the most solemn and elaborate form of the western Eucharist) – a role that was performed by a priest or reader at a simpler form of the Mass, and with assisting the deacon with the preparation of the oblations and with carrying them to the altar, (in those western rites that retained the Offertory Procession). They also assisted the deacon during the reading of the Gospel by carrying the Gospel book to and from (depending on the rite used) the place of proclamation, and by acting as a support for the book while the Gospel is read. At pontifical liturgies (at which a pontiff or bishop is present and presiding), the subdeacon also assisted the deacon in the vesting of the bishop.

The usual street-wear of the subdeacon was the cassock. (There was no distinction between an inner and outer cassock in the Western Rite, and all clergy wear one cassock only).

During liturgies, the subdeacon vested in an alb, over which they wore the maniple, the cincture, and the tunicle. Unlike his brother subdeacons in the Byzantine Rite who wear the orarion, the subdeacon does not wear its western equivalent – the stole – which is reserved for deacons, priests, and bishops.

== Catholic Church ==
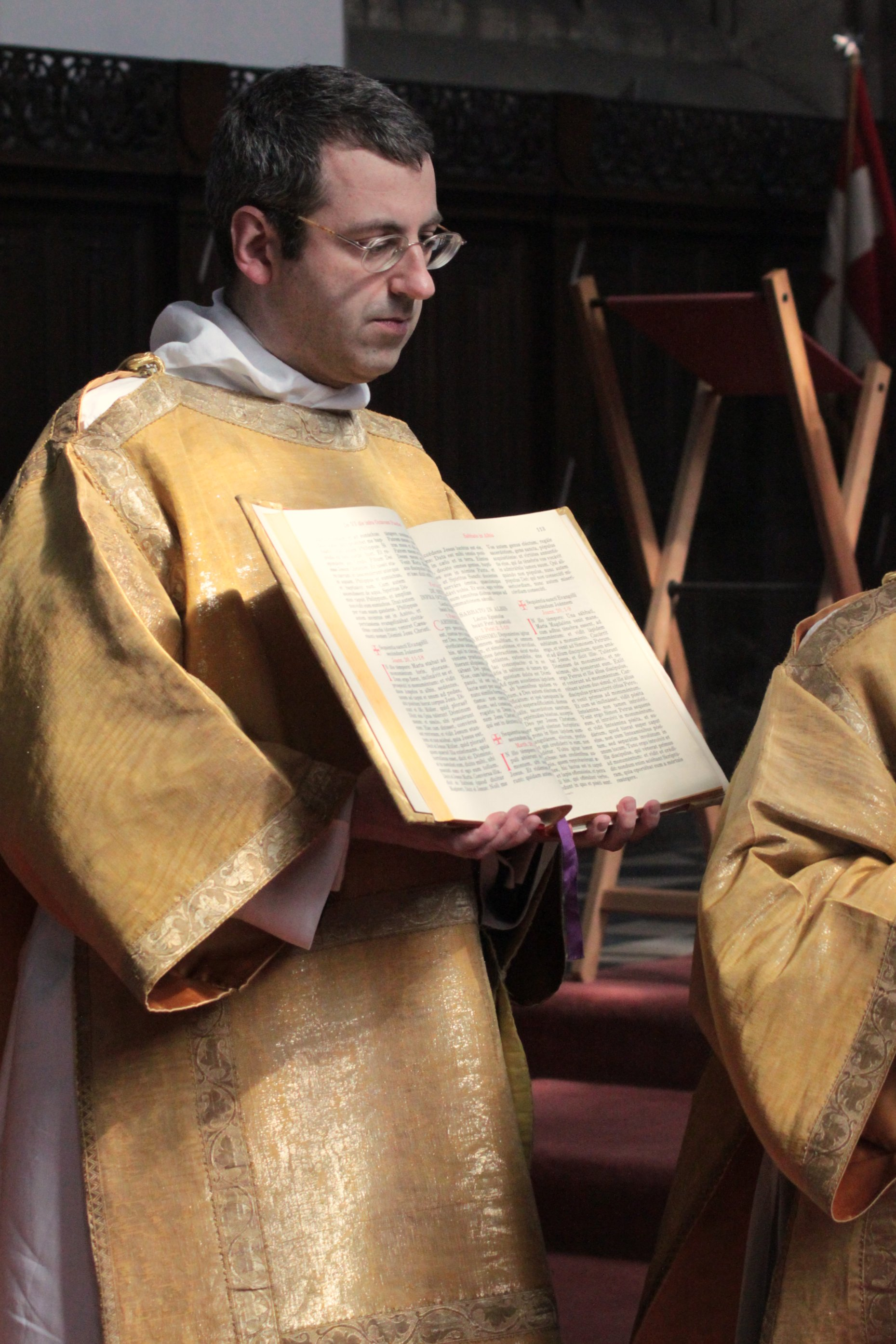
A Catholic subdeacon holding the Gospel

=== Latin Church ===
The order of subdeacon no longer exists in the Roman Catholic Church. Prior to the reform instituted by Pope Paul VI with his motu proprio Ministeria quaedam of 15 August 1972, the subdiaconate was regarded as the lowest of the major orders of the Latin Church. Paul decreed that "the major order of subdiaconate no longer exists in the Latin Church" and that the functions previously assigned to the subdeacon are now entrusted to the acolyte and the lector; he also decreed that, where the local episcopal conference so desired, the acolyte could be called a subdeacon.

The traditional rites of ordination to the subdiaconate and the minor orders (those of acolyte, exorcist, lector and porter) are still employed for members of certain Catholic religious institutes and societies of apostolic life authorized to use the extraordinary form of the Roman Rite but not conveying any canonical office.

As men in major orders, subdeacons, like deacons, were styled in English-speaking countries as "The Rev. Mr." In French the title of Abbé was often given to them and even to those in minor orders, as in the case of Franz Liszt.

The subdiaconate was generally considered a major order in the Latin church from the late 12th century. After that, ordination of a subdeacon did not include the laying on of hands. Instead, the bishop handed to him an empty chalice and paten, his vestments, cruets of wine and water, and the Book of the Epistles and pronounced a prayer of blessing for him. As a recipient of a major order, a subdeacon could not contract marriage, and any breach by him of the obligation to observe celibacy was classified as a sacrilege (cf. canon 132 of the 1917 Code of Canon Law). Canon 135 of the same Code of Canon Law obliged him to say all the canonical hours of the Divine Office (Liturgy of the Hours or Breviary).

The other major orders were those of the deacon and priest, that of bishop not being then considered an order distinct from that of priesthood. Thus, in speaking of orders, the Catechism of the Council of Trent declares : "Their number, according to the uniform and universal doctrine of the Catholic Church, is seven, Porter, Reader, Exorcist, Acolyte, Sub-deacon, Deacon and Priest. [...] Of these, some are greater, which are called 'Holy', some lesser, which are called 'Minor Orders'. The great or Holy Orders are Sub-deaconship, Deaconship and Priesthood; the lesser or Minor Orders are Porter, Reader, Exorcist, and Acolyte".

Today the Latin Church, as stated in the Code of Canon Law in force since 1983 ("The orders are the episcopate, the presbyterate, and the diaconate"), recognizes only three orders, those of bishop, priest (presbyter) and deacon, also referred to as "sacred orders" or "holy orders". In line with Pope Paul VI's Ministeria quaedam, what were called minor orders are now called ministries.

In the Solemn High Mass form of Tridentine Mass and the Ordinariate Mass, the duties of a subdeacon included those of crucifer, singing the Epistle, holding the Book of Gospels while the deacon sang the Gospel, carrying it back to the celebrant afterwards and assisting the priest or deacon in setting the altar. Although the subdeacons were allowed to carry out numerous functions specific to the diaconate, however they were always precluded from distributing Communion, in the form of both bread and wine. The subdeacon's specific vestment is the tunicle, in practice almost indistinguishable in form from the deacon's dalmatic (the tunicle is sometimes somewhat longer than the dalmatic or had slightly less elaborate decoration, but this is often unnoticeable by the casual church-goer). Unlike deacon and priest, he never wore a stole. In the former Mass rites he wore a maniple and also wore a humeral veil while holding the paten from the Offertory to the Our Father; and, if the chalice and paten with host are not already on the altar, he also used the humeral veil when bringing these to the altar at the Offertory. In practice, the roles of deacon and subdeacon in Solemn High Mass were generally performed by men already ordained as priests, wearing the subdiaconal or diaconal vestments.

=== Eastern Catholic Churches ===
In the Eastern Catholic Churches that use the Byzantine Rite, the order of subdeacon is the highest of the minor orders and its functions are equivalent to those of Orthodox subdeacons.

== Anglican Church ==
Whilst the office of subdeacon was not included in the Orders of Clergy when the Church of England was established during the 16th century, certain churches and communities in the Anglican Communion and within the Anglican Continuing Churches assign a layperson to act as subdeacon in the celebration of the liturgy of the Holy Communion (especially Solemn High Mass). However, this is considered a liturgical function one fulfills and not an order to which one is ordained. In some dioceses and provinces, laypersons who act as subdeacons in this manner may be required to be specifically authorised by the respective bishop or archbishop. In practice, an Anglican subdeacon performs similar roles to those performed in Latin Catholic or Western Rite Orthodox churches. The proper garments of the subdeacon are the alb and tunicle.

== Sources ==
- Morin, Jean (1695). Commentarius de sacris Ecclesiae ordinationibus secundum antiquos et recentiores Latinos, Graecos, Syros et Babylonios in tres partes distinctos (in Latin) (2nd ed.). Amsterdam: Henri Desbordes.
- Binterim, Anton Joseph (1825). Die vorzüglichsten Denkwürdigkeiten der Christ-Katholischen Kirche aus den ersten, mittlern und letzten Zeiten (in German). Mainz: Simon Müller.
- Nowowiejski, Antoni Julian (1887). Subdjakon i jego czynności podczas Mszy ś. i w innych obrzędach Kościoła katolickiego (in Polish). Warsaw: Drukarnia Franciszka Czerwińskiego (Warsaw). OCLC 894987786.
- Reuter, Heinrich (1890). Das Subdiakonat, dessen historische Entwicklung und liturgisch-kanonische Bedeutung (in German). Augsburg: Literarisches Institut Dr. Max Huttler.
- Wieland, Franz (1897). Die genetische Entwicklung der sog. Ordines minores in den drei ersten Jahrhunderten (in German). Freiburg im Breisgau: Verlag Herder.
- Faivre, Alexandre (1977). Naissance d'une hiérarchie: les premières étapes du cursus clérical (in French). Paris: Editions Beauchesne.
