= Cardinal (Catholic Church) =

Senior church official

The coat of arms of a cardinal (who is a bishop or archbishop) is indicated by a red galero (wide-brimmed hat) with 15 tassels on each side (the motto and escutcheon are proper to the individual cardinal).

A cardinal (Note: Its full title is "cardinal of the Holy Roman Church" (Latin: Sanctæ Romanæ Ecclesiæ cardinalis).) is a senior member of the clergy of the Catholic Church. As titular members of the clergy of the Diocese of Rome, they serve as advisors to the pope, who is the bishop of Rome and the visible head (Note: According to Catholic teaching, Jesus Christ is the "invisible head" of the Church, while the pope is the "visible head".) of the worldwide Catholic Church. Cardinals are chosen and formally created by the pope, and typically hold the title for life. Collectively, they constitute the College of Cardinals. The most solemn responsibility of the cardinals is to elect a new pope in a conclave when the Holy See is vacant. With a few historical exceptions, popes are elected from among the College of Cardinals.

During the period between a pope's death or resignation and the election of his successor, the day-to-day governance of the Holy See is in the hands of the College of Cardinals. The right to participate in a conclave is limited to cardinals who have not reached the age of 80 years by the day the vacancy occurs. With the pope, cardinals collectively participate in papal consistories, in which matters of importance to the Church are considered and new cardinals may be created. Cardinals of working age are also often appointed to roles overseeing dicasteries (departments) of the Roman Curia, the central administration of the Catholic Church.

Cardinals are drawn from a variety of backgrounds, being appointed as cardinals in addition to their existing roles within the Church. Most cardinals are bishops and archbishops leading dioceses and archdioceses around the world – often the most prominent diocese or archdiocese in their country. Others are titular bishops who are current or former officials within the Roman Curia, generally the heads of dicasteries and other bodies linked to the Curia. A very small number are priests recognised by the pope for their service to the Church. Canon law requires them to be generally consecrated as bishops before they are made cardinals, but some are granted a papal dispensation. (Note: The most recent recipient of such a dispensation (as of 2024) is Timothy Radcliffe.) There are no strict criteria for elevation to the College of Cardinals. Since 1917, a potential cardinal must already be at least a priest, but laymen have been cardinals in the past. The selection is entirely up to the pope, and tradition is his only guide.

As of 25 October 2026, there are 239 serving cardinals, of whom 116 are eligible to vote in a conclave to elect a new pope.

== History ==
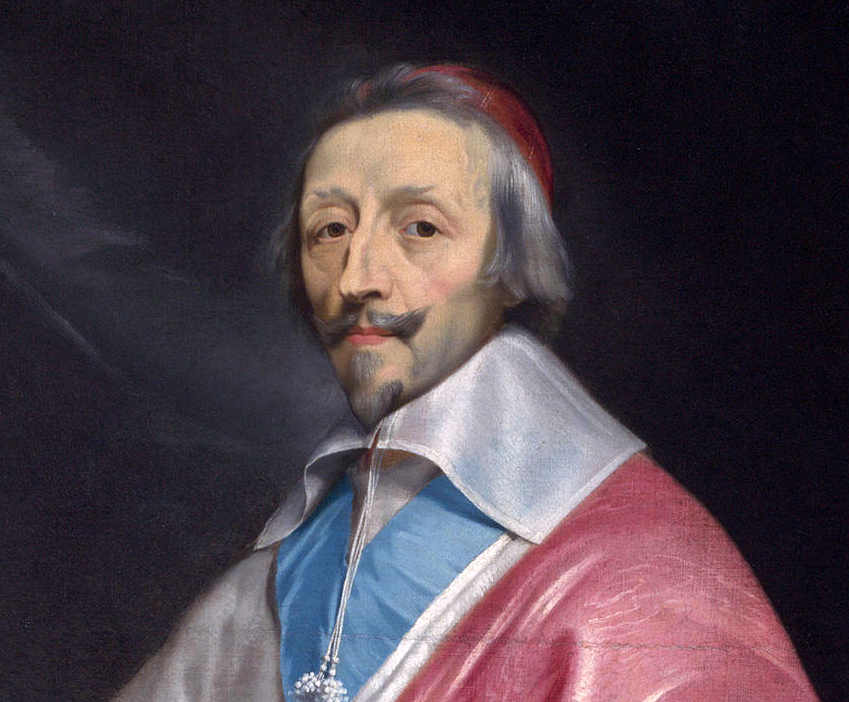
Cardinal Richelieu, chief minister of France in the early 17th century

There is general disagreement about the origin of the term, but a chief consensus is that the Latin cardinalis comes from the term cardo (meaning 'pivot' or 'hinge'). It was first used in late antiquity to designate a bishop or priest who was incorporated into a church for which he had not originally been ordained. In Rome the first persons to be called cardinals were the deacons of the seven regions of the city at the beginning of the 6th century, when the word began to mean 'principal', 'eminent', or 'superior'.

The name was also given to the senior priest in each of the "title" churches (the parish churches) of Rome and to the bishops of the seven sees surrounding the city. By the 8th century the Roman cardinals constituted a privileged class among the Roman clergy. They took part in the administration of the Church of Rome and in the papal liturgy. By decree of a synod of 769, only a cardinal was eligible to become Bishop of Rome. Cardinals were granted the privilege of wearing the red hat by Pope Innocent IV in 1244.

In cities other than Rome, the name cardinal began to be applied to certain churchmen as a mark of honour. The earliest example of this occurs in a letter sent by Pope Zacharias in 747 to Pippin the Younger, ruler of the Franks, in which Zacharias applied the title to the priests of Paris to distinguish them from country clergy. This meaning of the word spread rapidly, and from the 9th century various episcopal cities had a special class among the clergy known as cardinals. The use of the title was reserved for the cardinals of Rome in 1567 by Pius V.

In 1059, five years after the East-West Schism, the right of electing the pope was reserved to the principal clergy of Rome and the bishops of the seven suburbicarian sees. In the 12th century the practice of appointing ecclesiastics from outside Rome as cardinals began, with each of them assigned a church in Rome as his titular church or linked with one of the suburbicarian dioceses, while still being incardinated in a diocese other than that of Rome.

The term cardinal at one time applied to any priest permanently assigned or incardinated to a church, or specifically to the senior priest of an important church, based on the Latin cardo ('hinge'), meaning 'pivotal' as in "principal" or "chief". The term was applied in this sense as early as the 9th century to the priests of the tituli (parishes) of the diocese of Rome.

In the year 1563, the Ecumenical Council of Trent, headed by Pope Pius IV, wrote about the importance of selecting good cardinals: "nothing is more necessary to the Church of God than that the holy Roman pontiff apply that solicitude which by the duty of his office he owes the universal Church in a very special way by associating with himself as cardinals the most select persons only, and appoint to each church most eminently upright and competent shepherds; and this the more so, because our Lord Jesus Christ will require at his hands the blood of the sheep of Christ that perish through the evil government of shepherds who are negligent and forgetful of their office."

The earlier influence of temporal rulers, notably the kings of France, reasserted itself through the influence of cardinals of certain nationalities or politically significant movements. Traditions even developed entitling certain monarchs, including those of Austria, Spain, and France, to nominate one of their trusted clerical subjects to be created cardinal, a so-called "crown-cardinal".

In early modern times, cardinals often had important roles in secular affairs. In some cases, they took on powerful positions in government. In Henry VIII's England, his chief minister was for some time Cardinal Wolsey. Cardinal Richelieu's power was so great that he was for many years effectively the ruler of France. Richelieu's successor was also a cardinal, Jules Mazarin. Guillaume Dubois and André-Hercule de Fleury complete the list of the four great cardinals to have ruled France. In Portugal, due to a succession crisis, one cardinal, Henry of Portugal, was crowned king, the only example of a cardinal-king (although John II Casimir Vasa was a cardinal from 1646 until he resigned in 1647, later being elected and crowned King of Poland, in 1648 and 1649, respectively).

While the incumbents of some sees are regularly made cardinals, and some countries are entitled to at least one cardinal by concordat (usually earning either its primate or the metropolitan of the capital city the cardinal's hat), almost no see carries an actual right to the cardinalate, not even if its bishop is a patriarch: the notable exception is the Patriarch of Lisbon who, by Pope Clement XII's 1737 bull Inter praecipuas apostolici ministerii, is accorded the right to be elevated to the rank of cardinal in the consistory following his appointment.

== Papal elections ==
In 1059, Pope Nicholas II gave cardinals the right to elect the Bishop of Rome in the papal bull In nomine Domini. For a time this power was assigned exclusively to the cardinal bishops, but in 1179 the Third Lateran Council restored the right to the whole body of cardinals.

This council also established a two-thirds majority of the College of Cardinals as a requirement for a valid papal election.

== Numbers ==
In 1586, Pope Sixtus V limited the number of cardinals to 70: six cardinal bishops, 50 cardinal priests, and 14 cardinal deacons. The number of seventy was in reference to the Sanhedrin and to the seventy disciples. Pope John XXIII exceeded that limit citing the need to staff church offices. In November 1970, in Ingravescentem aetatem, Pope Paul VI established that electors would be under the age of 80 years. When it took effect on 1 January 1971, it deprived 25 cardinals of the right to participate in a conclave. In October 1975 in Romano Pontifici eligendo, he set the maximum number of electors at 120, while establishing no limit on the overall size of the college.

Popes can set aside church laws and they have regularly brought the number of cardinals under the age of 80 to more than 120, reaching as high as 140 with Pope Francis' consistory of December 2024. No more than 120 electors participated in a conclave until the conclave following the death of Pope Francis, in which 133 cardinals participated.

Pope Paul VI also increased the number of cardinal bishops by assigning that rank, in 1965, to patriarchs of the Eastern Catholic Churches when named cardinals. In 2018, Pope Francis expanded the cardinal bishops of Roman title, because this had not been done despite recent decades' expansion in the two lower orders of cardinals, besides having all six such cardinals being over the age limit for a conclave.

== Titular churches ==
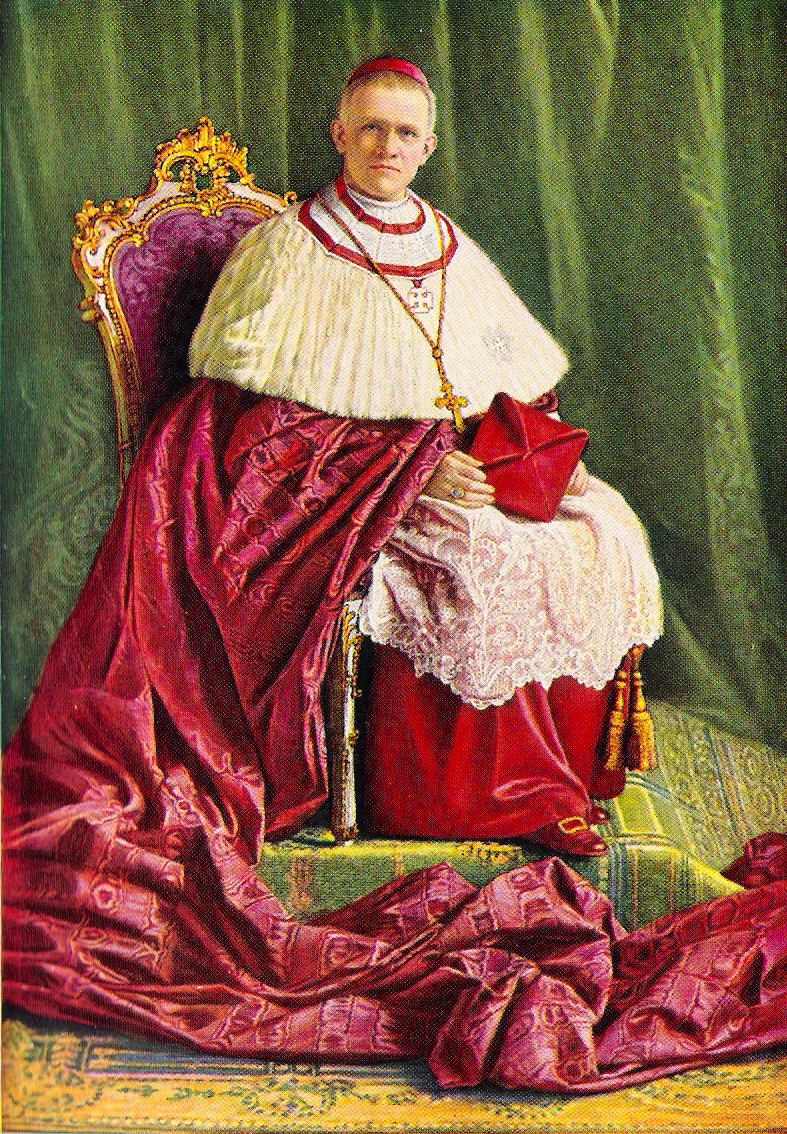
Cardinal Innitzer, Archbishop of Vienna and Cardinal-Priest of San Crisogono, pictured in the early 1930s

Each cardinal is assigned a titular church upon his creation, which is always a church in the city of Rome. Through the process of opting (optazione), a cardinal can rise through the ranks from cardinal deacon to cardinal priest, and previously could rise from cardinal priest to cardinal bishop. If a cardinal bishop, he usually obtains one of the suburbicarian sees located around the city of Rome. The only exception is for patriarchs of the Eastern Catholic Churches.

Nevertheless, cardinals possess no power of governance nor are they to intervene in any way in matters which pertain to the administration of goods, discipline, or the service of their titular churches. They are allowed to celebrate Mass and hear confessions and lead visits and pilgrimages to their titular churches, in coordination with the staff of the church. They often support their churches monetarily, and many cardinals do keep in contact with the pastoral staffs of their titular churches.

The Dean of the College of Cardinals in addition to such a titular church also receives the titular bishopric of Ostia, the primary suburbicarian see. Cardinals governing a particular church retain that church.

== Title and reference style ==
In 1630, Pope Urban VIII decreed their title to be Eminence (previously, it had been illustrissimus and reverendissimus) (Note: "They were formerly called illustrissimi and reverendissimi; but Pope Urban VIII (of the Barberini family), in 1630, established the above as their title of honour." Edward Wigglesworth, Thomas Gamaliel Bradford: Encyclopædia Americana: a popular dictionary of arts, sciences. Volume 4, page 493.) and decreed that their secular rank would equate to prince, making them second only to the pope and crowned monarchs. (Note: "As the exclusive electors of the pope (at least since 1179), cardinals were deemed to be the ecclesiastical equivalents of the Holy Roman Empire's 'Prince-Electors,' an extremely elite group with precedence over all other nobility (including archdukes, dukes and counts), who were tasked with the responsibility of electing Holy Roman Emperors [...] A decree of 10 June 1630, by Urban VII bestowed the title "His Eminence", historically reserved for high nobility, upon the cardinals, thus elevating them above 'His Excellency', then being used to refer to Italian princes." Guruge, Anura. The Next Pope. Alton, New Hampshire. 2010. p. 81.) (Note: "Authoritarian, keenly conscious of his position, Urban kept business in his own hands and rarely discussed it with his cardinals: to compensate them he gave them the rank of princes of the church and a right to the title of 'eminence' (June 1630)." Oxford Dictionary of Popes, Urban VIII)

In accordance with tradition, they sign by placing the title "Cardinal" (abbreviated Card.) after their personal name and before their surname as, for instance, "John Card(inal) Doe" or, in Latin, "Ioannes Card(inalis) Doe". Some writers, such as James-Charles Noonan, hold that, in the case of cardinals, the form used for signatures should be used also when referring to them in English.

Official sources, such as the Catholic News Service, say that the correct form for referring to a cardinal in English is normally as "Cardinal [First name] [Surname]". This is the rule given also in stylebooks not associated with the church. This style is also generally followed on the websites of the Holy See and episcopal conferences. Oriental patriarchs who are created cardinals customarily use Sanctae Ecclesiae Cardinalis as their full title, probably because they do not belong to the Roman clergy.

The "[First name] Cardinal [Surname]" order is used in the Latin proclamation of the election of a new pope by the cardinal protodeacon, (Note: "Annuntio vobis gaudium magnum; habemus Papam: Eminentissimum ac Reverendissimum Dominum, Dominum [first name] Sanctae Romanae Ecclesiae Cardinalem [last name], ..." (Meaning: "I announce to you a great joy; we have a Pope: The Most Eminent and Most Reverend Lord, Lord [first name] Cardinal of the Holy Roman Church [last name], ...")) if the new pope is a cardinal, as has been the case since 1389.

The title Prince of the Church has historically been applied to cardinals of the Catholic Church, and sometimes more broadly to senior members of the church hierarchy. It has been rejected by Pope Francis, who stated to a group of newly created cardinals "He (Jesus) does not call you to become 'princes' of the Church, to 'sit on his right or on his left.' He calls you to serve like Him and with Him." The title is still applied contemporarily, both officially and other times in criticism of the perceived attitudes of some cardinals.

== Orders and their chief offices ==
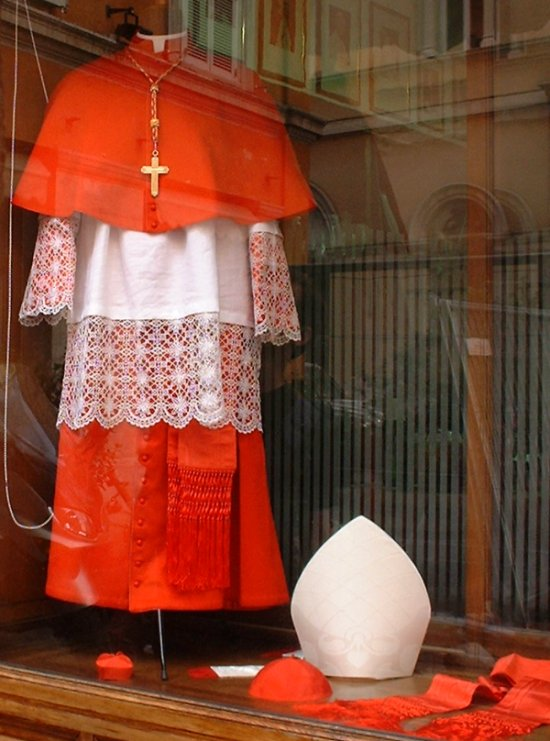
Choir dress of a cardinal

=== Cardinal bishops ===
Cardinal bishops (cardinals of the episcopal order; Latin: cardinales episcopi) are the senior order of cardinals. Though in modern times the vast majority of cardinals are also bishops or archbishops, few are "cardinal bishops". Until 1150, there were seven cardinal bishops, each presiding over one of the seven suburbicarian sees around Rome: Ostia, Albano, Porto and Santa Rufina, Palestrina, Sabina and Mentana, Frascati, and Velletri. Of these seven, Velletri was united with Ostia from 1150 until 1914, when Pope Pius X separated them again, but decreed that whichever cardinal bishop became Dean of the College of Cardinals would keep the suburbicarian see he already held, adding to it that of Ostia, with the result that there continued to be only six cardinal bishops. The actual number of cardinal bishops for the majority of the second millennium was thus six. Since 1962, the cardinal bishops have only a titular relationship with the suburbicarian sees, each of which is governed by a separate ordinary.

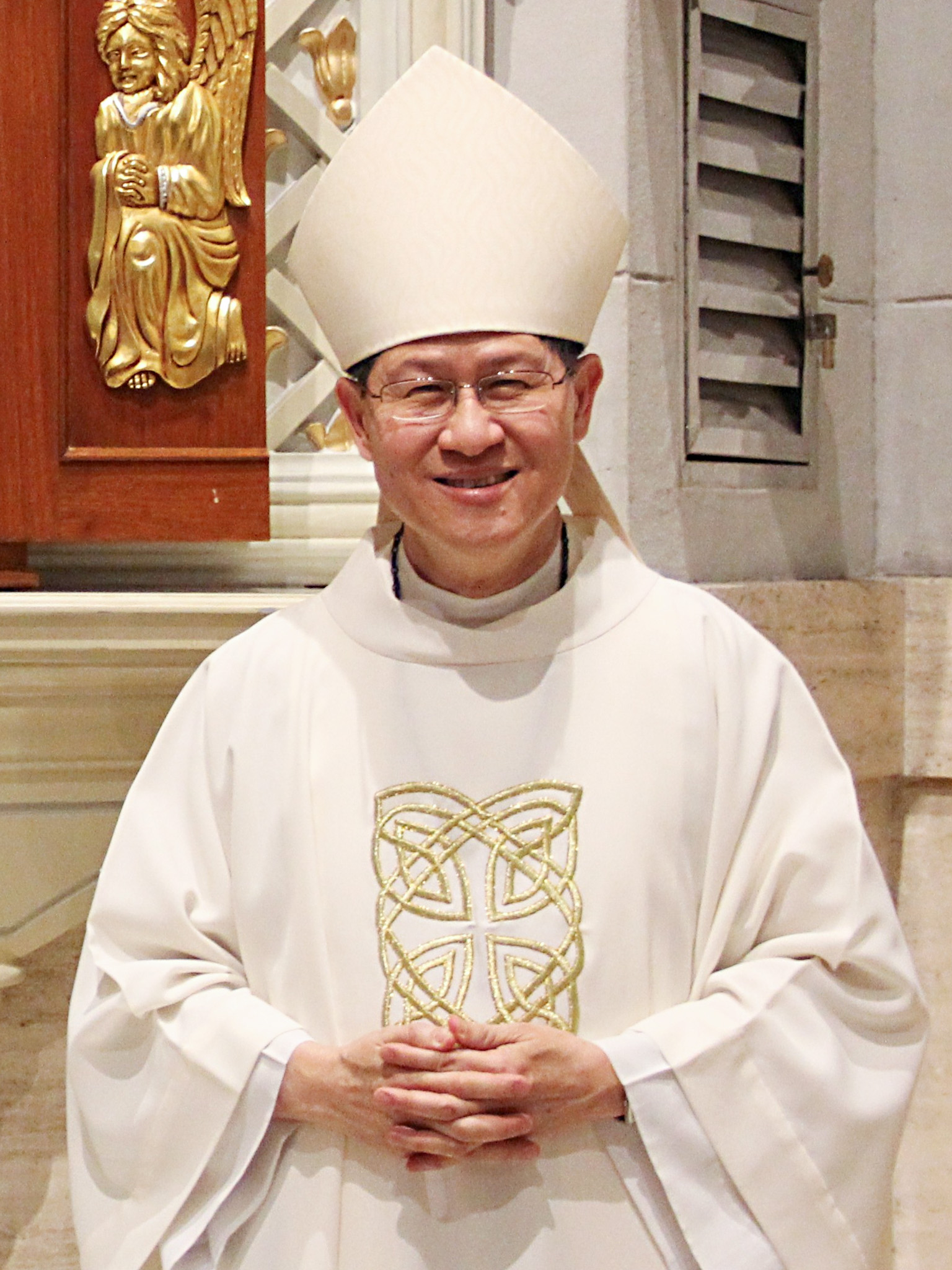
Luis Antonio Tagle is the Dean of the College of Cardinals since 8 October 2026.

Until 1961, membership in the order of cardinal bishops was achieved through precedence in the College of Cardinals. When a suburbicarian see fell vacant, the most senior cardinal by precedence could exercise his option to claim the see and be promoted to the order of cardinal bishops. (Note: In certain periods there were additional requirements. Since the 16th century, only a cardinal who was present within 25 leagues of Rome when the vacancy occurred could exercise the option. When the see of Frascati became vacant upon the death of Cardinal Tommaso Zigliara on 11 May 1893, Cardinal Francesco Ricci Paracciani was in Siena, which disqualified him and allowed Cardinal Serafino Vannutelli to exercise the option and become cardinal bishop of Frascati.) Pope John XXIII abolished that privilege on 10 March 1961 and made the right to promote someone to the order of cardinal bishops the sole prerogative of the pope. (Note: He exercised his new authority later that month by appointing Giuseppe Ferretto cardinal bishop of Sabina e Poggio Mirteto on 26 March 1961. Ferretto was the lowest ranking member of the order of cardinal priests and only 62. He had been a cardinal for ten weeks.)

In 1965, Pope Paul VI decreed in his motu proprio Ad purpuratorum Patrum Collegium that patriarchs of the Eastern Catholic Churches who were named cardinals (i.e. "cardinal patriarchs") would also be cardinal bishops, ranking after the six Latin Church cardinal bishops of the suburbicarian sees. Latin Church patriarchs who become cardinals are cardinal priests, not cardinal bishops: for example Angelo Scola was made the Patriarch of Venice in 2002 and cardinal priest of Santi XII Apostoli in 2003. Those of cardinal patriarch rank continue to hold their patriarchal see and are not assigned any Roman title (suburbicarian see, title or deaconry).

At the June 2018 consistory, Pope Francis increased the number of Latin Church cardinal bishops to match the expansion in cardinal priests and cardinal deacons in recent decades. He elevated four cardinals to this rank granting their titular churches and deaconries suburbicarian rank pro hac vice (temporarily) and making them equivalent to suburbicarian see titles. At the time of the announcement, all six cardinal bishops of suburbicarian see titles, as well as two of the three cardinal patriarchs, were non-electors as they had reached the age of 80. Pope Francis created another cardinal bishop in the same way on 1 May 2020, bringing the number of Latin Church cardinal bishops to 11.

The dean of the College of Cardinals, the highest-ranking cardinal, was formerly the longest-serving cardinal bishop, but since 1965 is elected by the Latin Church cardinal bishops from among their number, subject to papal approval. Likewise the vice-dean, formerly the second longest-serving, is also elected. Seniority of the remaining Latin Church cardinal bishops is still by date of appointment to the rank. The current dean is Luis Antonio Tagle and the vice-dean is Leonardo Sandri.

=== Cardinal priests ===
Cardinal priests (Latin: cardinales presbyteri) are the most numerous of the three orders of cardinals in the Catholic Church, ranking above the cardinal deacons and below the cardinal bishops. Those who are named cardinal priests today are generally also bishops of important dioceses throughout the world, though some hold Curial positions.

In modern times, the term cardinal priest is interpreted as meaning a cardinal who is of the order of priests. Originally this referred to certain key priests of important churches of the Diocese of Rome, who were recognized as the cardinal priests – the important priests chosen by the pope to advise him in his duties as Bishop of Rome. Certain clerics in many dioceses at the time, not just that of Rome, were said to be the key personnel—the term gradually became exclusive to Rome to indicate those entrusted with electing the Bishop of Rome, the pope.

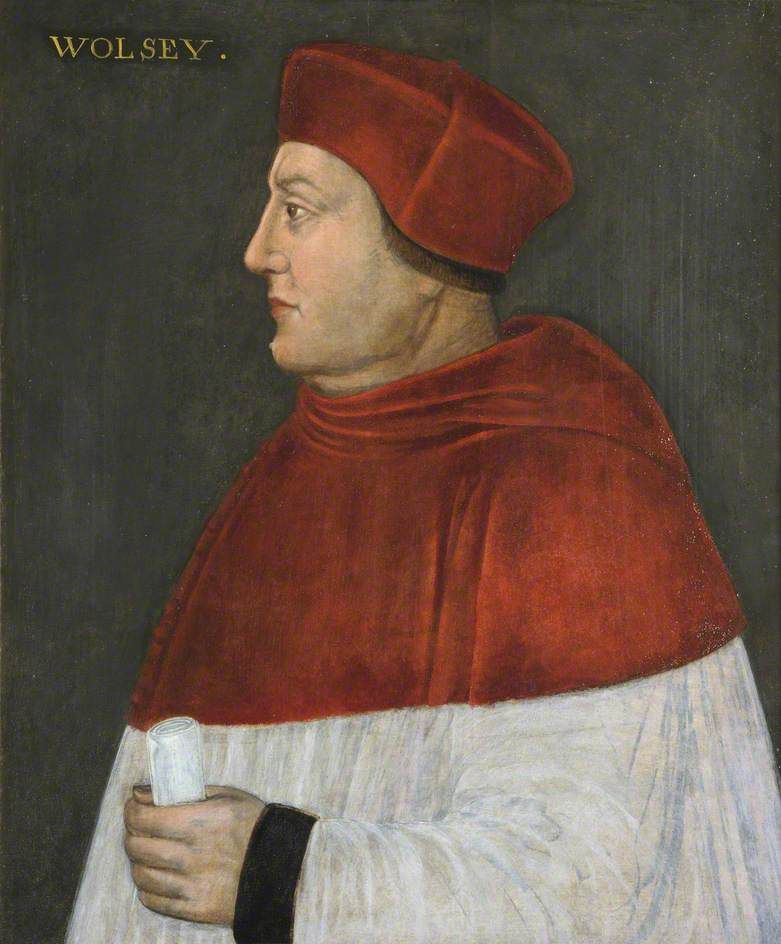
Cardinal-priest Thomas Wolsey

While the cardinalate has long been expanded beyond the Roman pastoral clergy and Roman Curia, every cardinal priest has a titular church in Rome, though they may be bishops or archbishops elsewhere, just as cardinal bishops were given one of the suburbicarian dioceses around Rome. Pope Paul VI abolished all administrative rights cardinals had with regard to their titular churches, though the cardinal's name and coat of arms are still posted in the church, and they are expected to celebrate Mass and preach there if convenient when they are in Rome.

While the number of cardinals was small from the times of the Roman Empire to the Renaissance, and frequently smaller than the number of recognized churches entitled to a cardinal priest, in the 16th century the college expanded markedly. In 1587, Pope Sixtus V sought to arrest this growth by fixing the maximum size of the college at 70, including 50 cardinal priests, about twice the historical number. This limit was respected until 1958, and the list of titular churches modified only on rare occasions, generally when a building fell into disrepair. When Pope John XXIII abolished the limit, he began to add new churches to the list, which Popes Paul VI and John Paul II continued to do. Today there are close to 150 titular churches, out of more than 300 churches in Rome.

The cardinal who is the longest-serving member of the order of cardinal priests is titled cardinal protopriest. He had certain ceremonial duties in the conclave that have effectively ceased because he would generally have already reached age 80, at which cardinals are barred from the conclave. The current cardinal protopriest is Michael Michai Kitbunchu of Thailand.

=== Cardinal deacons ===
The cardinal deacons (Latin: cardinales diaconi) are the lowest-ranking cardinals. Cardinals elevated to the diaconal order are either officials of the Roman Curia or priests elevated after their 80th birthday, chosen mainly for the honor of it, since those over 80 are not able to vote in a conclave. While bishops with diocesan responsibilities are created cardinal priests, it is generally not so for cardinal deacons.

Cardinal deacons derive originally from the seven deacons in the Papal Household who supervised the church's works in the 14 districts of Rome during the early Middle Ages, when church administration was effectively the government of Rome and provided all social services. They came to be called "cardinal deacons" by the late eighth century, and they were granted active rights in papal elections and made eligible for the election as pope by the Lateran Council of 769.

Cardinals elevated to the diaconal order are mainly officials of the Roman Curia holding various posts in the church administration. Their number and influence has varied through the years. While historically predominantly Italian, the group has become much more internationally diverse in later years. In 1939, about half were Italian. In 1994, approximately one third were Italian. Their influence in the election of the pope has been considered important. They are better informed and connected than the dislocated cardinals but their level of unity has been varied.

Under the 1587 decree of Pope Sixtus V, which fixed the maximum size of the College of Cardinals, there were 14 cardinal deacons. Later the number increased. As late as 1939 almost half of the cardinals were members of the Curia. Pius XII reduced this percentage to 24 percent. John XXIII brought it back up to 37 percent but Paul VI brought it down to 27 percent. John Paul II maintained this ratio.

As of 2005, there were more than 50 churches recognized as cardinalatial deaconries, though there were only 30 cardinals of the order of deacons. Cardinal deacons have long enjoyed the right to "opt for the order of cardinal priests" (optazione) after they have been cardinal deacons for ten years. They may on such elevation take a vacant "title" (a church allotted to a cardinal priest as the church in Rome with which he is associated) or their diaconal church may be temporarily elevated to a cardinal priest's "title" for that occasion. When elevated to cardinal priests, they take their precedence according to the day they were first made cardinal deacons, thus ranking above cardinal priests who were elevated to the college after them, regardless of order.

When not celebrating Mass, but still serving a liturgical function, such as the semiannual Urbi et Orbi papal blessing, some Papal Masses and some events at Ecumenical Councils, cardinal deacons can be recognized by the dalmatics they would don with the simple white mitre (so called mitra simplex).

Cardinal Dominique Mamberti, the current protodeacon. He announced the election of Pope Leo XIV.

==== Cardinal protodeacon ====
The cardinal protodeacon is the senior cardinal deacon in order of appointment to the College of Cardinals. If he is a cardinal elector and participates in a conclave, he announces a new pope's election and name (Note: The cardinal protodeacon does not announce a new pope's name until the pope elect has been ordained a bishop.) from the central balcony of St. Peter's Basilica in Vatican City. The protodeacon also bestows the pallium on the new pope and crowns him with the papal tiara, although the crowning has not been celebrated since Pope John Paul I opted for a simpler papal inauguration ceremony in 1978. The current cardinal protodeacon is Dominique Mamberti.

==== Cardinal protodeacons since 1887 ====
Coat of arms of Cardinal Mamberti, current Cardinal Protodeacon

- Giuseppe Pecci, S.J. (20 December 1887 – 8 February 1890)
- John Henry Newman, C.O. (8 February 1890 – 11 August 1890)
- Joseph Hergenröther (11 August 1890 – 3 October 1890)
- Tommaso Maria Zigliara, O.P. (3 October 1890 – 1 June 1891)
- Isidoro Verga (1 June 1891 – 22 June 1896)
- Luigi Macchi (22 June 1896 – 29 March 1907); announced election of Pope Pius X (1903)
- Andreas Steinhuber, S.J. (29 March 1907 – 15 October 1907)
- Francesco Segna (15 October 1907 – 4 January 1911)
- Francesco Salesio Della Volpe (4 January 1911 – 5 November 1916 (his death)); announced election of Pope Benedict XV (1914)
- Gaetano Bisleti (5 November 1916 – 17 December 1928); (Note: Ceased to be protodeacon upon being raised to the order of cardinal-priest) announced election of Pope Pius XI (1922)
- Camillo Laurenti (17 December 1928 – 16 December 1935)
- Camillo Caccia-Dominioni (16 December 1935 – 12 November 1946 (his death)); announced election of Pope Pius XII (1939)
- Nicola Canali (12 November 1946 – 3 August 1961 (his death)); announced election of Pope John XXIII (1958)
- Alfredo Ottaviani (3 August 1961 – 26 June 1967); announced election of Pope Paul VI (1963)
- Arcadio Larraona Saralegui, CMF (26 June 1967 – 28 April 1969)
- William Theodore Heard (28 April 1969 – 18 May 1970)
- Antonio Bacci (18 May 1970 – 20 January 1971 (his death))
- Michael Browne, OP (20 January 1971 – 31 March 1971 (his death))
- Federico Callori di Vignale (31 March 1971 – 8 August 1971†)
- Charles Journet (8 August 1971 – 5 March 1973)
- Pericle Felici (5 March 1973 – 30 June 1979); announced elections of Pope John Paul I (1978) and Pope John Paul II (1978)
- Sergio Pignedoli (30 June 1979 – 15 June 1980 (his death))
- Umberto Mozzoni (15 June 1980 – 2 February 1983)
- Opilio Rossi (2 February 1983 – 22 June 1987)
- Giuseppe Caprio (22 June 1987 – 26 November 1990)
- Aurelio Sabattani (26 November 1990 – 5 April 1993)
- Duraisamy Simon Lourdusamy (5 April 1993 – 29 January 1996)
- Eduardo Martínez Somalo (29 January 1996 – 9 January 1999)
- Pio Laghi (9 January 1999 – 26 February 2002)
- Luigi Poggi (26 February 2002 – 24 February 2005)
- Jorge Medina (24 February 2005 – 23 February 2007); announced election of Pope Benedict XVI (2005)
- Darío Castrillón Hoyos (23 February 2007 – 1 March 2008)
- Agostino Cacciavillan (1 March 2008 – 21 February 2011)
- Jean-Louis Tauran (21 February 2011 – 12 June 2014); announced election of Pope Francis (2013)
- Renato Raffaele Martino (12 June 2014 – 28 October 2024 (his death))
- Dominique Mamberti (28 October 2024 – present); announced election of Pope Leo XIV (2025)

== Special types of cardinals ==
=== Camerlengo ===
The Cardinal Camerlengo of the Holy Roman Church, assisted by the Vice-Camerlengo and the other prelates of the office known as the Apostolic Camera, has functions that in essence are limited to a period of sede vacante of the papacy. He is to collate information about the financial situation of all administrations dependent on the Holy See and present the results to the College of Cardinals, as they gather for the papal conclave. The current Cardinal Camerlengo is Kevin Farrell.

=== Cardinals who are not bishops ===
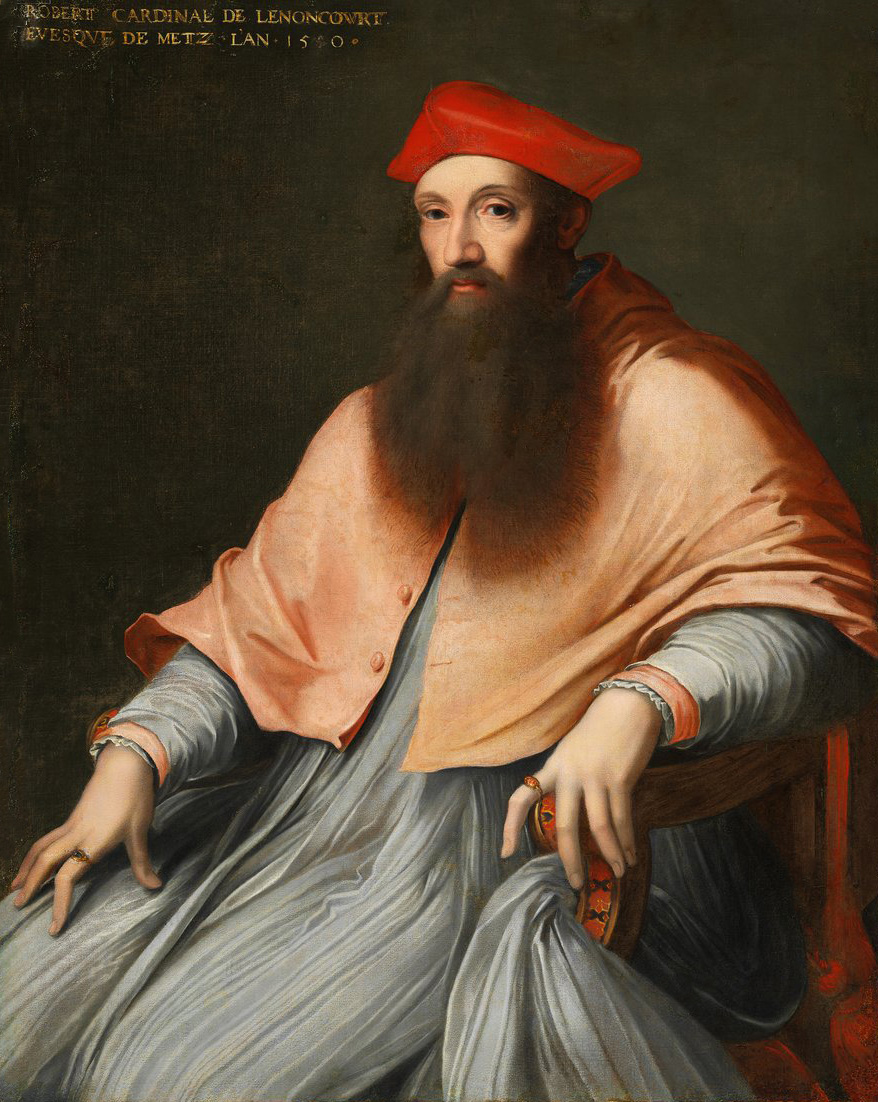
Reginald Pole was a cardinal for 18 years before he was ordained a priest.

Until 1918, any cleric, even one only in minor orders, could be created a cardinal (see "lay cardinals", below), but enrolled only in the order of cardinal deacons. For example, in the 16th century, Reginald Pole was a cardinal for 18 years before he was ordained a priest. The 1917 Code of Canon Law mandated that all cardinals, even cardinal deacons, had to be priests, and, in 1962, Pope John XXIII set the norm that all cardinals be consecrated as bishops, even if they are only priests at the time of appointment.

As a consequence of these two changes, canon 351 of the 1983 Code of Canon Law requires that a cardinal be at least in the order of priesthood at his appointment, and that those who are not already bishops must receive episcopal consecration. Several cardinals near to or over the age of 80 when appointed have obtained dispensation from the rule of having to be a bishop. (Note: Examples include Domenico Bartolucci, Karl Josef Becker, Yves Congar, Avery Dulles, Aloys Grillmeier, Henri de Lubac, Leo Scheffczyk, Roberto Tucci, Albert Vanhoye, and Raniero Cantalamessa.) These were all appointed cardinal-deacons, but Roberto Tucci and Albert Vanhoye lived long enough to exercise the right of option and be promoted to the rank of cardinal-priest. Since the 1962 rule change, Timothy Radcliffe has been the only non-bishop cardinal who took part in a papal election, in the 2025 papal conclave.

A cardinal who is not a bishop is entitled to wear and use the episcopal vestments and other pontificalia, episcopal regalia being the mitre, crozier, zucchetto, pectoral cross, and ring. He has both actual and honorary precedence over archbishops, and bishops who are not cardinals. However, he cannot perform the sacrament of ordination or other rites reserved solely to bishops.

=== "Lay cardinals" ===
At various times, there have been cardinals who had only received first tonsure and minor orders but not yet been ordained as deacons or priests. Though clerics, they were inaccurately called "lay cardinals". Teodolfo Mertel was among the last of these cardinals. When he died in 1899 he was the last surviving cardinal who was not at least ordained a priest. With the revision of the Code of Canon Law promulgated in 1917 by Pope Benedict XV, only those who are already priests or bishops may be appointed cardinals. Since the time of Pope John XXIII, a priest who is appointed a cardinal must be consecrated a bishop, unless they receive a papal dispensation from this requirement.

=== Cardinals in pectore or secret cardinals ===
In addition to the named cardinals, the pope may name secret cardinals or cardinals in pectore (Latin for 'in the breast'). During the Western Schism, many cardinals were created by the contending popes. Beginning with the reign of Pope Martin V, cardinals were created without publishing their names until later, a practice termed creati et reservati in pectore. A cardinal named in pectore is known only to the pope. In the modern era, popes have named cardinals in pectore to protect them or their congregations from political persecution or other danger.

If conditions change in respect of that persecution, the pope may make the appointment public. The cardinal in question then ranks in terms of precedence with those who were made cardinals at the time of the in pectore appointment. If a pope dies before revealing the identity of an in pectore cardinal, the person's status as cardinal expires. The last pope known to have named a cardinal in pectore is Pope John Paul II, who named four, including one whose identity was never revealed. (Note: The three were: Ignatius Kung Pin-Mei, Bishop of Shanghai, made cardinal 1979, revealed 1991; Marian Jaworski, Archbishop of Lviv, made cardinal 1998, revealed 2001; Jānis Pujāts, Archbishop of Riga, made cardinal 1998, revealed 2001. Pope John Paul II created a fourth in 2003 but did not reveal his identity, not even in his will. Speculation centered on Joseph Zen Ze-kiun, Bishop of Hong Kong, Tadeusz Kondrusiewicz, Archbishop of Moscow, and Archbishop Stanisław Dziwisz, John Paul's longtime friend and secretary. Joseph Zen and Stanisław Dziwisz were named as cardinals by his successor Benedict XVI.)

== Vesture and privileges ==
Pontifical vestments

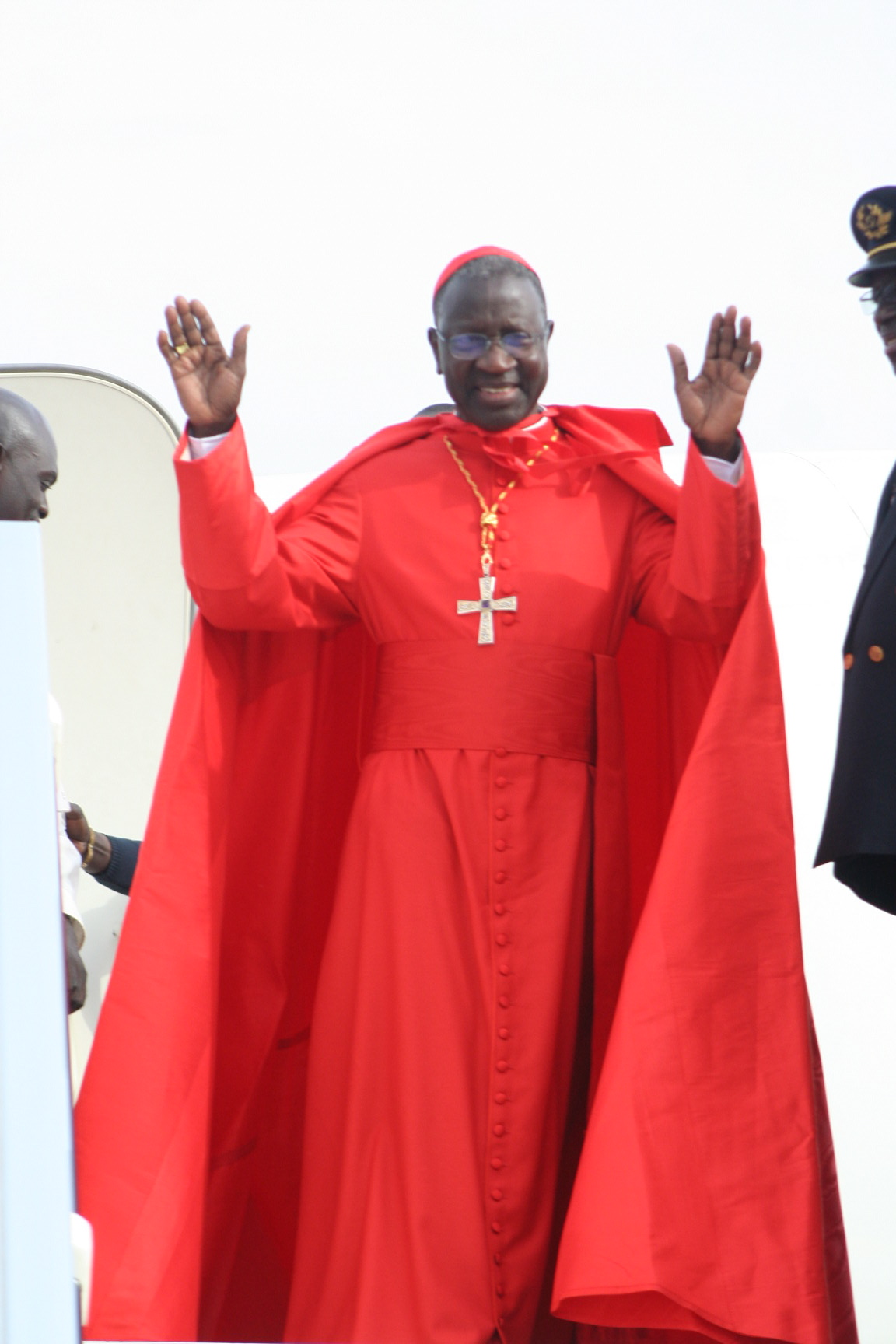
Cardinal Sarr with a ferraiolo and wearing a red cassock, but not the rest of the choir dress

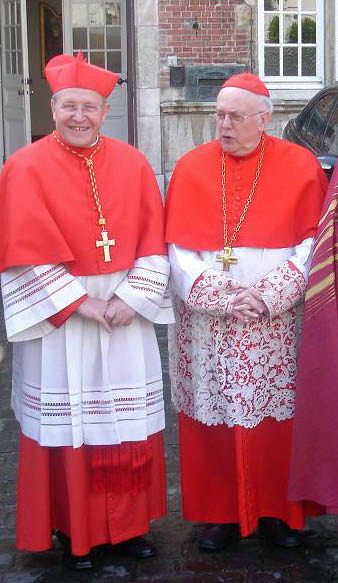
Cardinals Walter Kasper (left) and Godfried Danneels (right) wearing their choir dress: scarlet (red) cassock, white rochet trimmed with lace, scarlet mozetta, scarlet biretta (over the usual scarlet zucchetto), and pectoral cross on a cord, or, in Danneels' case, wrongly on a chain.

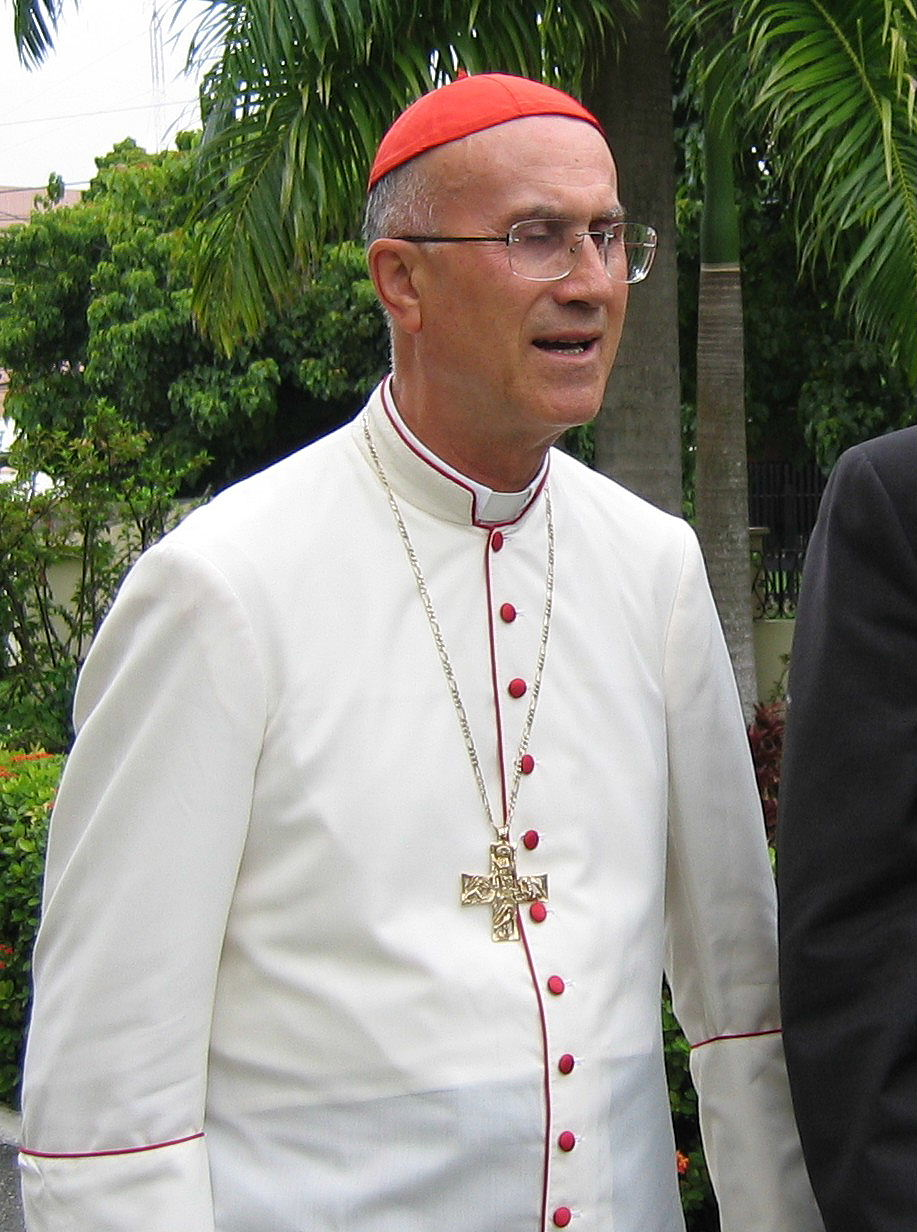
Cardinal Bertone in dress for hot tropical countries, a white cassock with scarlet piping and buttons

When in choir dress, a Latin Church cardinal wears scarlet garments—the blood-like red symbolizes a cardinal's willingness to die for his faith. Excluding the rochet—which is always white—the scarlet garments include the cassock, mozzetta, and biretta, over the usual scarlet zucchetto. The biretta of a cardinal is distinctive not merely for its scarlet color, but also for the fact that it does not have a pompom or tassel on the top as do the birettas of other prelates.

Until the 1460s, it was customary for cardinals to wear a violet or blue cape unless granted the privilege of wearing red when acting on papal business. His normal-wear cassock is black but has scarlet piping and a scarlet fascia (sash). Occasionally, a cardinal wears a scarlet ferraiolo which is a cape worn over the shoulders, tied at the neck in a bow by narrow strips of cloth in the front, without any 'trim' or piping on it. The cardinal bird is named after the clerics due to the similarity of their scarlet colors.

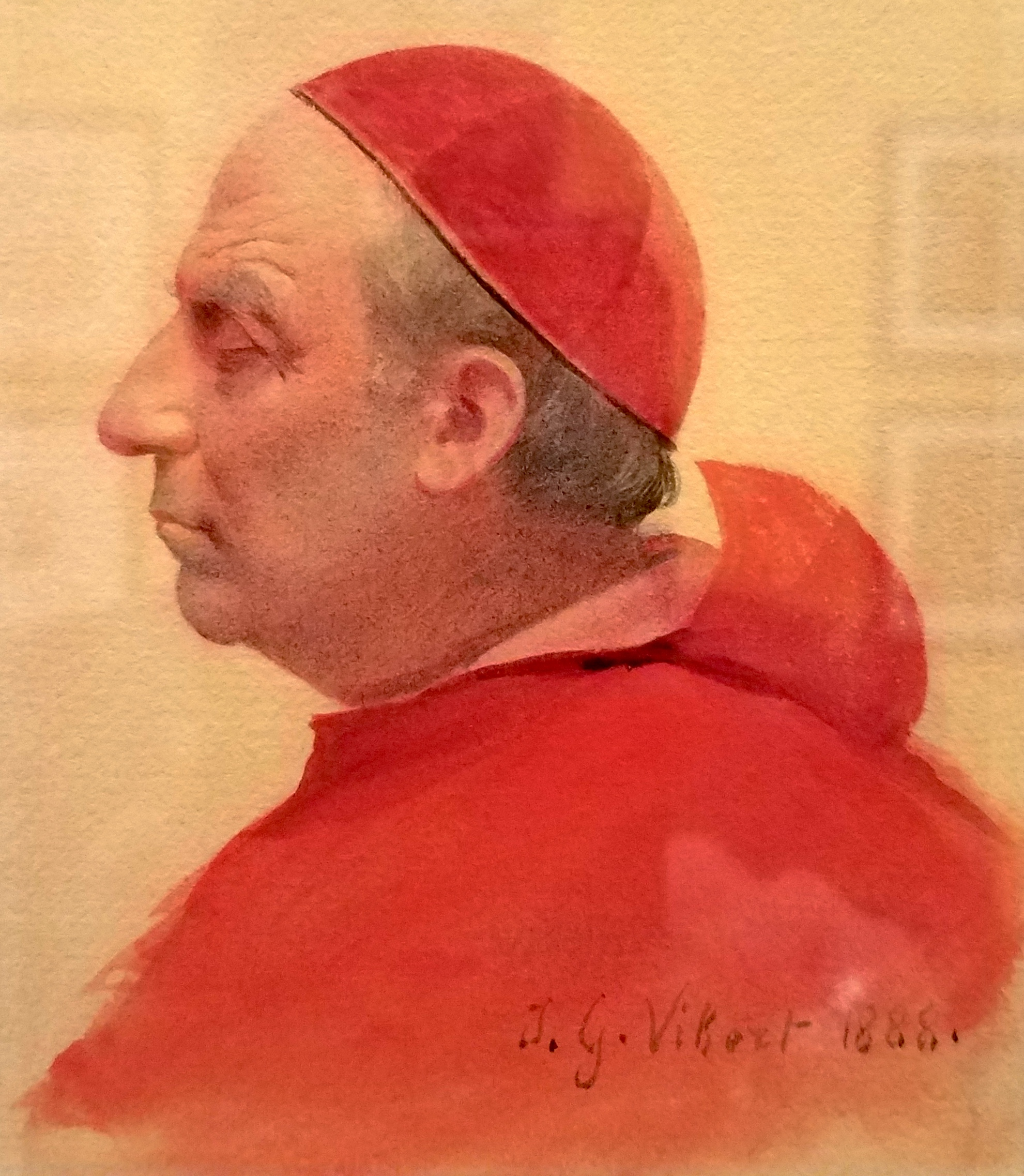
A Cardinal in Profile, 1880, by Jehan Georges Vibert, Morgan Library and Museum, New York City

Eastern Catholic cardinals continue to wear the normal dress appropriate to their liturgical tradition, though some may line their cassocks with scarlet and wear scarlet fascias, or in some cases, wear Eastern-style cassocks entirely of scarlet.

In previous times, at the consistory at which the pope named a new cardinal, he would bestow upon him a distinctive wide-brimmed hat called a galero. This custom was discontinued in 1969 and the investiture now takes place with the scarlet biretta. In ecclesiastical heraldry, the scarlet galero is still displayed on the cardinal's coat of arms. Cardinals had the right to display the galero in their cathedral, and when a cardinal died, it would be suspended from the ceiling above his tomb. Some cardinals will still have a galero made, even though it is not officially part of their apparel.

To symbolize their bond with the papacy, the pope gives each newly appointed cardinal a gold ring, which is traditionally kissed by Catholics when greeting a cardinal, as with a bishop's episcopal ring. Before the new uniformity imposed by John Paul II, each cardinal was given a ring, the central piece of which was a gem, usually a sapphire, with the pope's stemma engraved on the inside. There is now no gemstone, and the pope chooses the image on the outside: under Pope Benedict XVI it was a modern depiction of the crucifixion of Jesus, with Mary and John to each side. The ring includes the pope's coat of arms on the inside.

Cardinals have in canon law a "privilege of forum", i.e., exemption from being judged by ecclesiastical tribunals of ordinary rank. Only the pope is competent to judge them in matters subject to ecclesiastical jurisdiction, cases that refer to matters that are spiritual or linked with the spiritual, or with regard to infringement of ecclesiastical laws and whatever contains an element of sin, where culpability must be determined and the appropriate ecclesiastical penalty imposed. The pope either decides the case himself or delegates the decision to a tribunal, usually one of the tribunals or congregations of the Roman Curia. Without such delegation, no ecclesiastical court, even the Roman Rota, is competent to judge a canon law case against a cardinal.

Additionally, canon law gives cardinals the faculty (ability) to hear confessions validly and licitly everywhere; while bishops too have this global confession-hearing faculty, they can be restricted in their use of it in a particular area by the local bishop.

== List of canonized or otherwise venerated cardinals ==
Many cardinals have been canonized (made saints) or are otherwise venerated ("raised to the altars") by the Catholic Church.

Saints

- Bernardo degli Uberti, O.S.B.Vall. (c. 1060 – 4 December 1133), Bishop of Parma, canonized on 3 December 1139.
- Guarino Foscari da Palestrina, C.R.S.A. (c. 1080 – 6 February 1158), Cardinal-Bishop of Palestrina, canonized in 1159
- Bonaventura da Bagnoregio, O.F.M. (c. 1221 – 15 July 1274), scholar, Cardinal Bishop of Albano, and Doctor of the Church (Seraphic Doctor), canonized on 14 April 1482.
- John Fisher (c. 19 October 1469 – 22 June 1535), Bishop of Rochester executed by order of Henry VIII during the English Reformation for refusing to accept him as the supreme head of the Church of England, canonized on 19 May 1935.
- Carlo Borromeo (2 October 1538 – 3 November 1584), Archbishop of Milan, founder of the Confraternity of Christian Doctrine, and a leading figure of the Counter-Reformation, canonized on 1 November 1610.
- Roberto Bellarmino, S.J. (4 October 1542 – 17 September 1621), a leading figure of the Counter-Reformation, and Doctor of the Church, canonized on 29 June 1930.
- Gregorio Barbarigo (16 September 1625 – 18 June 1697), Bishop of Padua who distinguished himself for his diplomatic and scholastic service, canonized on 26 May 1960.
- Giuseppe Maria Tomasi, C.R. (12 September 1649 – 1 January 1713), Cardinal-Priest of Santi Silvestro e Martino ai Monti, whose scholarship was a significant source of the reforms in the liturgy of the Catholic Church during the 20th century, canonized on 12 October 1986.
- John Henry Newman, C.O. (21 February 1801 – 11 August 1890), convert from Anglicanism and appointed Cardinal-Deacon of San Giorgio in Velabro, canonized on 13 October 2019.

Blesseds

- Pietro "Igneo" Aldobrandini, O.S.B.Vall. (died 11 November 1089), Cardinal-Bishop of Albano, beatified on 4 March 1673.
- Pierre de Luxembourg, O.Cart. (19 July 1369 – 2 July 1387), Bishop of Metz, beatified on 9 April 1527.
- Bonaventura Badoer da Peraga, O.S.A. (22 June 1332 – 10 June 1389), Prior General of the Order of Saint Augustine, beatified in c. 1440.
- Giovanni Dominici, O.P. (c. 1355 – 10 June 1419), Apostolic Administrator of Bova, beatified on 9 April 1832.
- Niccolò Albergati, O.Cart. (c. 1373 – 9 May 1443), Bishop of Bologna and papal diplomat to France and England, beatified on 25 September 1744.
- Louis Aleman, C.R.S.J. (c. February 1390 – 16 September 1450), Archbishop of Arles, beatified on 9 April 1527.
- Paolo Burali d'Arezzo, C.R. (c. 1511 – 17 June 1578), Archbishop of Naples, beatified on 18 June 1772.
- Giuseppe Benedetto Dusmet, O.S.B. (15 August 1818 – 4 April 1894), Archbishop of Catania, beatified on 25 September 1988.
- Marcelo Spínola y Maestre (14 January 1835 – 19 January 1906), Archbishop of Seville and founder of the Handmaids of the Divine Heart, beatified on 29 March 1987.
- Ciriaco María Sancha y Hervás (17 June 1833 – 25 February 1909), Archbishop of Toledo, Primate of Spain and the Patriarch of the West Indies, and founder of the Sisters of Charity of Cardinal Sancha, beatified on 18 October 2009.
- Andrea Carlo Ferrari (13 August 1850 – 2 February 1921), Archbishop of Milan, beatified on 10 May 1987.
- Clemens August Graf von Galen (16 March 1878 – 22 March 1946), former count and Bishop of Münster, who denounced Gestapo lawlessness and the persecution of the Church in Nazi Germany, beatified on 9 October 2005.
- Alfredo Ildefonso Schuster, O.S.B. (8 January 1880 – 30 August 1954), Archbishop of Milan, beatified on 12 May 1996.
- Alojzije Stepinac (8 May 1898 – 10 February 1960), Archbishop of Zagreb martyred by communist forces in Croatia, beatified on 3 October 1998.
- Iuliu Hossu (30 January 1885 – 28 May 1970), Bishop of Cluj-Gherla appointed cardinal in pectore and martyred by communist forces in Romania, beatified on 2 June 2019
- Stefan Wyszyński (3 August 1901 – 28 May 1981), Archbishop of Warsaw and Archbishop of Gniezno, well known for his stands against both Nazism and Communism, beatified on 12 September 2021.
- Eduardo Francisco Pironio (3 December 1920 – 5 February 1998), Argentinian Cardinal-Bishop of Sabina-Porto Mirteto, beatified on 16 December 2023.

Declared Blessed by popular acclaim

- Henri de Marcy, O.Cist (c. 1136 – 1 January 1189), Cardinal-Bishop of Albano, venerated by the Cistercian Order
- Tesauro Beccaria, O.S.B.Vall. (died 12 September 1258), Abbot General of the Order martyred for having secretly negotiated with Manfred of Sicily in favor to return the Ghibellines to Florence, venerated by the Vallumbrosan Order
- Francesco Ronci, O.S.B.Coel. (c. 1223 – 13 October 1294), Cardinal-Priest of San Lorenzo in Damaso and Superior General of the Celestine Order, venerated in the Diocese of Teramo-Atri
- Domenico Serrano, O.de.M. (died 9 July 1348), professor of the University of Paris and Cardinal-Priest of Santi Quatto Coronati, also the Master General of the Mercedarian Order, of which the Order now venerates
- Alessandro Oliva da Sassoferato, O.S.A. (c. 1407 – 20 August 1463), Cardinal-Priest of Santa Susanna, venerated in the Order of Saint Augustine.

Venerables

- Marcantonio Barbarigo (6 March 1640 – 26 May 1706), relative of Gregorio Barbarigo, Archbishop of Montefiascone e Corneto, founder of the Pontifical Institute of the Religious Teachers Filippini, Religious Teachers Filippini of Montefiascone and the Augustinian Sisters of Divine Love, declared Venerable on 6 July 2007.
- Pietro Marcellino Corradini (2 June 1658 – 8 February 1743), Cardinal-Bishop of Frascati, founder of the Congregation of the Collegine Sisters of the Holy Family, declared Venerable on 24 April 2021.
- Sisto Riario Sforza (5 December 1810 – 29 September 1877), Archbishop of Naples who aided victims of two cholera epidemics and the 1861 eruption of Mount Vesuvius, declared Venerable on 28 June 2012.
- Guglielmo da Piova (Lorenzo Antonio Massaja), O.F.M. Cap. (9 June 1809 – 6 August 1889), Cardinal-Priest of Ss. Vitale, Gervasio e Protasio missionary, declared Venerable on 1 December 2016.
- August Jozef Hlond, S.D.B. (5 July 1881 – 22 October 1948), Archbishop of Poznań and Gniezno and as Primate of Poland, declared Venerable on 19 May 2018.
- Elia Dalla Costa (14 May 1872 – 22 December 1961), Archbishop of Florence, declared Venerable on 4 May 2017.
- József Mindszenty (29 March 1892 – 6 May 1975), Archbishop of Esztergom and Prince-Primate of Hungary, declared Venerable on 12 February 2019
- Phanxicô Xaviê Nguyễn Văn Thuận (17 April 1928 – 16 September 2002), Vietnamese cardinal and President of the Pontifical Council for Justice and Peace, declared Venerable on 4 May 2017.

Servants of God

- Hélie de Bourdeilles, O.F.M. (c. 1423 – 5 July 1484), Archbishop of Tours, declared as a Servant of God on 26 February 1913.
- Francisco Jiménez de Cisneros, O.F.M. (c. 1436 – 8 November 1517), inquisitor, Archbishop of Toledo, and Primate of Spain, declared as a Servant of God on 15 October 1669.
- Stanisław Hozjusz (5 May 1504 – 5 August 1579), Prince-Bishop of Warmia
- Cesare Baronio, C.R. (30 October 1538 – 10 June 1607), Cardinal Priest of Santi Nereo ed Achilleo
- Marcello d'Aste (21 July 1657 – 11 June 1709), Cardinal-Priest of Santi Silvestro e Martino ai Monti
- Giovanni Antonio Guadagni, O.C.D. (14 September 1674 – 15 January 1759), Vicar General of Rome
- Carlo Odescalchi, S.J. (5 March 1785 – 17 August 1841), Archbishop of Ferrara and Cardinal-Bishop of Sabina
- Lodovico Altieri (17 July 1805 – 11 August 1867), Bishop of Albano and Camerlengo of the Holy Roman Church, declared as a Servant of God on 14 March 2009.
- Giuseppe Guarino (6 March 1827 – 21 September 1897), Archbishop of Messina and founder of the Apostles of the Holy Family, declared as a Servant of God on 20 January 1986.
- François-Marie-Benjamin Richard de la Vergne (1 March 1819 – 27 January 1908), Archbishop of Paris
- Rafael Merry del Val y Zulueta (10 October 1865 – 26 February 1930), Secretary of the Congregation of the Holy Office
- Pietro la Fontaine (29 November 1860 – 9 July 1935), Patriarch of Venice
- Carlo Rossi (Raffaello di San Giuseppe), O.C.D. (28 October 1876 – 17 September 1948), Secretary of the Sacred Consistorial Congregation
- Joseph Leon Cardijn (13 November 1882 – 24 July 1967), Cardinal-Deacon of San Michele Arcangelo a Pietralata and founder of the movement of Young Christian Workers (Jocists), declared as a Servant of God in 2015
- Josef Beran (29 December 1888 – 17 May 1969), Archbishop of Prague, declared as a Servant of God on 9 February 1998.
- Charles Journet (26 January 1891 – 15 April 1975), Cardinal-Priest of Santa Maria in Campitelli, and the first Swiss to be named a cardinal
- Émile Biayenda (c. 1927 – 23 March 1977), Congolese Archbishop of Brazzaville whose cause of murder is still undetermined, declared as a Servant of God on 20 March 1995.
- Henri-Marie de Lubac, S.J. (20 February 1896 – 4 September 1991), Cardinal-Deacon of Santa Maria in Domnica, whose writings and doctrinal research played a key role in shaping the Second Vatican Council
- Anastasio Alberto Ballestrero, O.C.D. (3 October 1913 – 21 June 1998), Archbishop of Turin, declared as a Servant of God in 2014
- Paul Zoungrana, M.Afr. (3 September 1917 – 4 June 2000), Archbishop of Ouagadougou
- José Alí Lebrún Moratinos (19 March 1919 – 21 February 2001), Archbishop of Caracas
- Franjo Kuharić (15 April 1919 – 11 March 2002), Archbishop of Zagreb
- Maurice Michael Otunga (c. January 1923 – 6 September 2003), Archbishop of Nairobi
- Peter Porekuu Dery (10 May 1918 – 6 March 2008), Ghanaian Cardinal-Deacon of Sant'Elena fuori Porta Prenestina and Archbishop of Tamale, declared as a Servant of God on 13 July 2013.
- Bernardin Gantin (8 May 1922 – 13 May 2008), Beninese Dean of the College of Cardinals and Cardinal-Bishop of Ostia, declared as a Servant of God in January 2025.
- Andraos Ghattas [Stéphanos II], C.M. (16 January 1920 – 20 January 2009), Eparch of Alexandria of the Copts
- Stephen Kim Sou-hwan (8 May 1922 – 16 February 2009), Archbishop of Seoul and the first Korean to be elevated to the cardinalate
- Gilberto Angelo Agustino (26 July 1922 – 31 January 2017), titular cardinal of Santi Urbano e Lorenzo a Prima Porta
- Liubomyr Huzar, MSU (26 February 1933 – 31 May 2017), Major Archbishop of Kyiv-Galicia

== See also ==
- Cardinal-Infante (disambiguation)
- Cardinal-nephew
- Cardinal protector
- Hierarchy of the Catholic Church
- List of current cardinals
- List of the creations of the cardinals

== Bibliography ==
- Kuttner, Steven (1945). "Cardinalis: The History of a Canonical Concept". Traditio. 3: 129–214. doi:10.1017/S0362152900016883. JSTOR 27830076. S2CID 149333519.
- Battandier, Albert (1913). "Ecclesiastical Addresses" . In Herbermann, Charles (ed.). Catholic Encyclopedia. New York: Robert Appleton Company.
- Noonan, Jr., James-Charles (1996). The Church Visible: The Ceremonial Life and Protocol of the Roman Catholic Church. Viking. ISBN 0-670-86745-4.
- Sägmüller, Johannes Baptist (1913). "Cardinal" . In Herbermann, Charles (ed.). Catholic Encyclopedia. New York: Robert Appleton Company.
- Boudinhon, Auguste (1911). "Cardinal" . In Chisholm, Hugh (ed.). Encyclopædia Britannica (11th ed.). Cambridge University Press.
- Hollingswirth, Mary, Miles Pattenden and Arnold Witte, eds (2020), A Companion to the Early Modern Cardinal. Leiden/Boston: Brill. ISBN 978-90-04-41544-7
