= Piolanti =

Piolanti is a surname. Notable people with the surname include:

- Antonio Piolanti (1911–2001), Italian priest
- Raphaël Piolanti (born 1967), French hammer thrower
