= Minor orders =

Ranks of ministry in Christianity

In Christianity, minor orders are ranks of church ministry. In the Catholic Church, the predominating Latin Church formerly distinguished between the major orders—priest (including bishop), deacon and subdeacon—and four minor orders—acolyte, exorcist, lector, and porter (in descending order of seniority). In 1972, the Vatican re-titled the minor orders as "ministries", with those of lector and acolyte being kept throughout the Latin Church. In the Eastern Orthodox Church, the three minor orders in use are those of subdeacon, reader and chanter.

The rites by which all four minor orders were conferred, but not the actual conferral of the order, are still employed for members of some Catholic religious institutes and societies of apostolic life authorized to observe the 1962 form of the Roman Rite.

Some traditionalist Catholics continue to use minor orders, as do Old Catholics, the Polish National Catholic Church and the Liberal Catholic Church.

== Western Catholicism ==
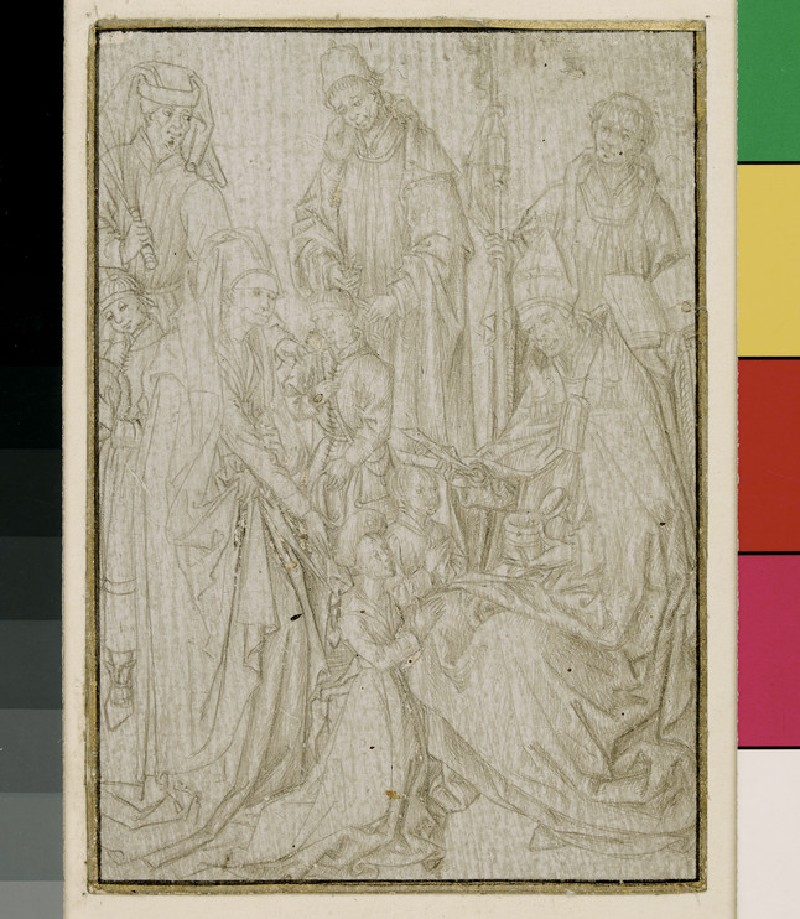
Confirmation and Conferring of Minor Orders (school of Rogier van der Weyden, 15th century)

From the beginning of the 3rd century, there is evidence in Western Christianity of the existence of what became the four minor orders (acolytes, exorcists, doorkeepers, and readers), as well as of cantors and fossores (tomb diggers). The evidence for readers is probably the earliest. In the West, unlike the East, where imposition of hands was used, the rite of ordination was by the handing over to them of objects seen as instruments of the office.

The Council of Sardica (343) mentions the lectorate alone as obligatory before ordination to the diaconate. The obligation to receive all four minor orders appears to date only from a time when they ceased to indicate exercise of an actual function. Even in the early years of the 20th century, no minimum age, other than that of the "age of reason", was laid down for receiving minor orders. However, the 1917 Code of Canon Law laid down that nobody was to be given clerical tonsure, which had to be received before minor orders, before beginning the regular course of theological studies. Before the entry into force of that Code, it was an almost universal custom to confer all four minor orders at one time, since the bishop was authorized to dispense from the rule that each order had to be exercised for some time before reception of the next highest order. Today, as indicated in the 1983 Code of Canon Law, anyone who is to be ordained to the diaconate must already have received the ministries of lector and acolyte and exercised them for a suitable period, with an interval of at least six months between becoming an acolyte and becoming a deacon.

The 1917 Code of Canon Law also restricted conferral of tonsure and any order below that of the presbyterate to those who intended to become priests and who were judged likely to be worthy priests. Previously, there were lay cardinals and others, including the famous Franz Liszt, who received minor orders alone. They could even marry and remain clerics, the status of belonging to the clergy being at that time conferred through clerical tonsure, provided that they married only once and that to a virgin; but by the early 20th century a cleric who married was considered to have forfeited his clerical status. Today, a man who receives what were previously called minor orders is not yet a cleric, since today one becomes a cleric only upon ordination to the diaconate, a rule that applies even to members of institutes authorized to observe the 1962 form of the Roman Rite, such as the Priestly Fraternity of Saint Peter and others under the care of the Pontifical Commission Ecclesia Dei, regarding, however, only the incardination of members within the institute or society.

In the early 20th century, Auguste Boudinhon said that, on the grounds that minor orders did not originate with Jesus or the apostles, the view that minor orders and the subdiaconate were sacramental, a view held by several medieval theologians, was no longer held. The slightly earlier G. van Noort said that the view of their sacramentality, which was held by most scholastic theologians, including Thomas Aquinas, was then held only by a few, among whom he mentioned Louis Billot (1846–1931) and Adolphe Tanquerey (1854–1932). In the 1950s, Antonio Piolanti recognized as orders only episcopacy, priesthood (presbyterate) and diaconate, the three whose transmission is reserved to bishops. In speaking of the hierarchical structure of the Church, the Second Vatican Council mentioned only these three orders, not minor orders or subdiaconate.

By Pope Paul VI's motu proprio Ministeria quaedam of 15 August 1972, the term "minor orders" has been replaced by that of "ministries". Two of what were called minor orders, those of reader and acolyte, are kept throughout the Latin Church, and national episcopal conferences are free to use the term "subdeacon" in place of that of "acolyte". The motu proprio specified the functions of each of these two ministries. A prescribed interval, as decided by the Holy See and the national episcopal conference, is to be observed between receiving them. Candidates for diaconate and for the priesthood must receive both ministries and exercise them for some time before receiving holy orders.

Conferral of the minor orders or ministries is by the ordinary: either a diocesan bishop or someone who is equivalent in law to a diocesan bishop or, in the case of clerical religious institutes and societies of apostolic life, a major superior. The two ministries that are in use throughout the Latin Church could be conferred even on persons who are not candidates for holy orders.

In the Latin Church, the lay ministries of acolyte and lector, may be entrusted to all suitable faithful, whether male or female, per CIC Canon 230 §2. Additionally there is established the instituted ministry of the Catechist, whether male or female.

== Eastern Christianity ==
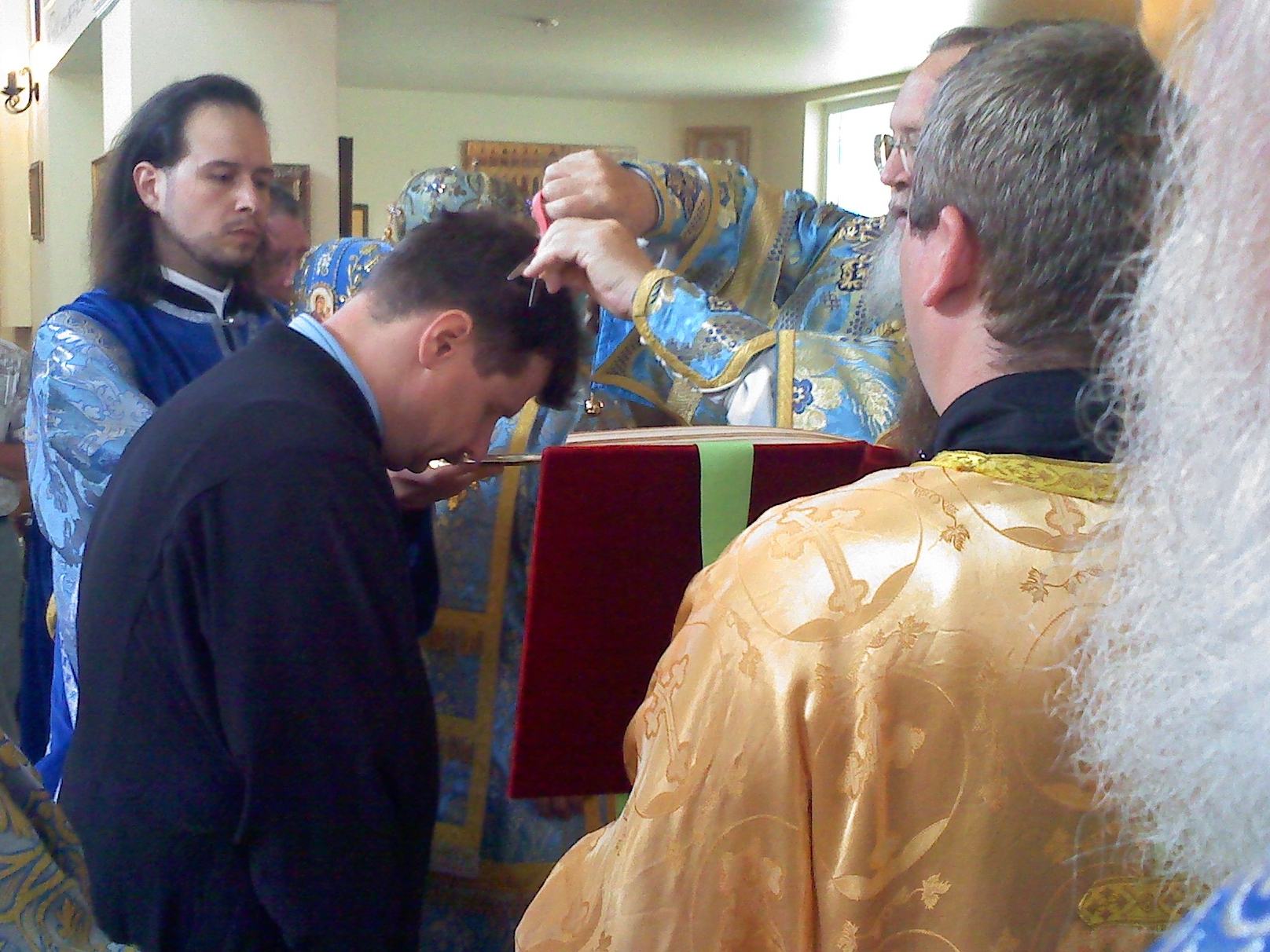
Orthodox layman, wearing a cassock, is tonsured in preparation for being ordained to the minor orders of candle-bearer and reader.

Eastern Christianity traditionally views the subdeacon as a minor order. The other common minor order is reader (lector). The minor order of porter is mentioned historically in some service-books, but no longer is given; all of the rights and responsibilities of each minor order are viewed as contained in the subdiaconate.

The 23 sui iuris Eastern Catholic Churches in union with Rome have their traditional minor orders, governed by their own particular law. In all Eastern Catholic Churches, subdeacons are minor clerics, since admission to major orders is by ordination as deacon. The Byzantine tradition allows for several orders of minor clerics. The sui iuris Byzantine Catholic Metropolitan Church of Pittsburgh, also called the Byzantine-Ruthenian Church, has the minor orders of candle bearer, cantor, lector and subdeacon, and in English uses the term "ordination" for their cheirothesis. The minor orders of candle bearer and cantor are given before tonsure during ordination to the lectorate.

Eastern Orthodox Churches routinely confer the minor orders of reader and subdeacon, and some jurisdictions also ordain cantors. Ordination to minor orders is performed outside the sanctuary and at any communal worship service, but always outside the context of actual Divine Liturgy. The order of taper-bearer is now used as part of ordination as a lector. The orders of doorkeepers, exorcists, and acolytes are no longer in common use.
