= Cardinal-Infante =

The title Cardinal-Infante may refer to any one of the following, each of them both an infante (prince) and a cardinal:

- Cardinal-Infante Jaime of Portugal (1433–1459)
- Cardinal-Infante Afonso of Portugal (1509–1540)
- Henry of Portugal (1512–1580), Cardinal-Infante (1545–1578), Cardinal-King of Portugal (1578–1580)
- Cardinal-Infante Ferdinand of Austria (1609–1641), Spanish-born political and military figure
- Cardinal-Infante Luis of Spain (1727–1785)

== See also ==
- Cardinal-nephew Ranuccio Farnese, referred to as il cardinalino ("the little cardinal") due to his young age at appointment
- Crown cardinal, the overall practice of creating cardinals from European royalty
- Cardinal protector
- Lay cardinal
