= Ostiarius =

Profession

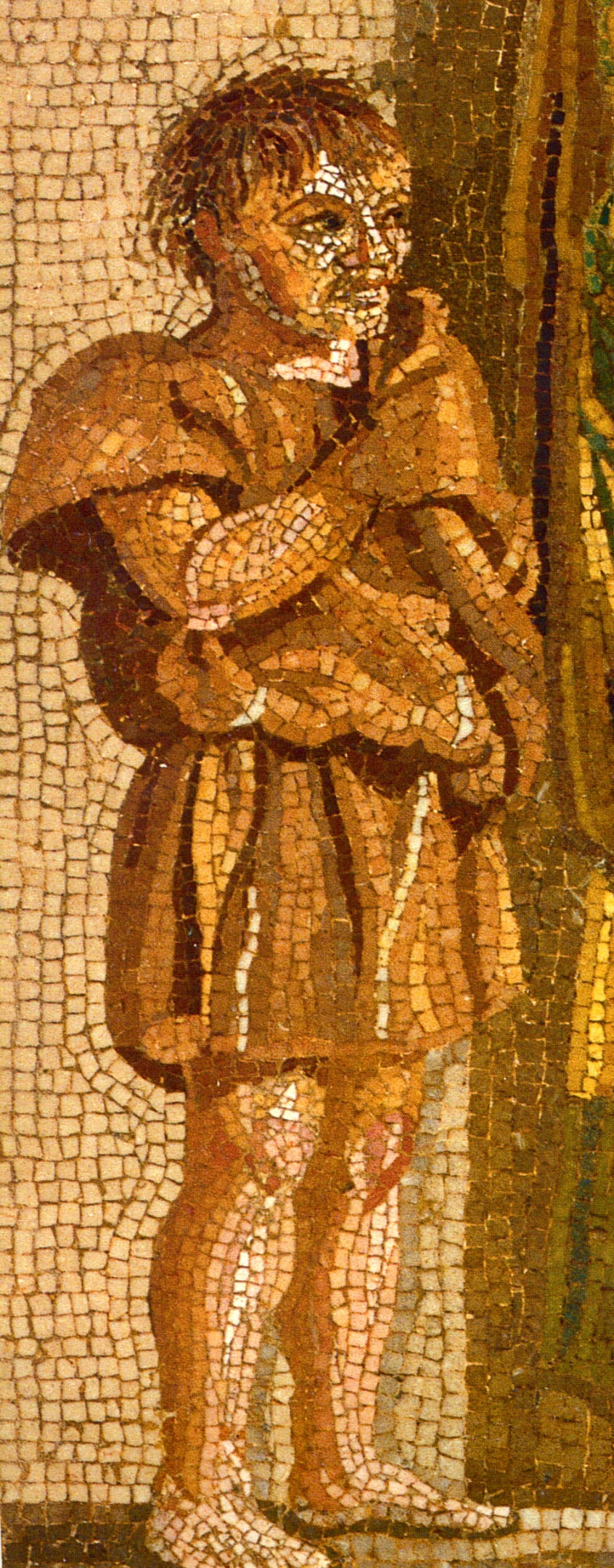
Mosaic depicting a man in a tunic watching a street scene from the Villa del Cicerone in Pompeii, 1st century CE

An ostiarius, a Latin word sometimes anglicized as ostiary but often literally translated as porter or doorman, originally was a slave or guard posted at the entrance of a building, similarly to a gatekeeper.

In the Latin Church, this "porter" became the lowest of the four minor orders prescribed by the Council of Trent. This was the first order a seminarian was admitted to after receiving the tonsure. The porter had in ancient times the duty of opening and closing the church-door and of guarding the church, especially to ensure no unbaptised persons would enter during the Eucharist. Later on, the porter would also guard, open and close the doors of the sacristy, baptistry and elsewhere in the church.

The porter was not a part of holy orders administering sacraments but simply a preparatory job on the way to the major orders: subdiaconate (until its suppression, after the Second Vatican Council by Pope Paul VI), diaconate and the priesthood. Like the other minor orders and the subdiaconate, it is retained in societies such as the Priestly Fraternity of St. Peter and the Institute of Christ the King Sovereign Priest.

== History ==
In the Roman period, an ostiarius was a slave whose duty was to guard the entrance of an upper-class citizen's house, sometimes being chained to the doorway to prevent flight. A basilica originally served as a Roman court of law, and it was the duty of the ostiarius to regulate the approach of litigants to the judge.

When, from the end of the second century, the Christian communities began to own houses for holding church services and for purposes of administration, church ostiaries are soon mentioned, at least for the larger cities. They are first referred to in the letter of Pope Cornelius to Bishop Fabius of Antioch written in 251, where it is said that there were then at Rome 46 priests, 7 deacons, 7 subdeacons, 42 acolytes, and 52 exorcists, lectors, and ostiaries, or doorkeepers. According to the statement of the Liber Pontificalis, an ostiary named Romanus suffered martyrdom in 258 at the same time as St. Lawrence.

In Western Europe the office of the ostiary was the lowest grade of the minor clergy. In a law of 377 of the Codex Theodosianus intended for the Vicariate of Italy, the ostiaries are also mentioned among the clergy who have a right to personal immunity. In his letter of 11 March 494, to the bishops of southern Italy and Sicily, Pope Gelasius says that for admission into the clergy it was necessary that the candidate could read (must, therefore, have a certain amount of education), for without this prerequisite an applicant could, at the most, only fill the office of an ostiary.

In Rome itself this office attained to no particular development, as a large part of these duties, namely the physical work necessary in the church building, what is now probably the duty of the sexton, was at Rome performed by the mansionarii. The clergy of the three lower grades (minor orders) were united at Rome into the Schola cantorum (choir) and as such took part in the church ceremonies. There are no special prayers or ceremonies for the ordination of the lower clergy in the oldest liturgical books of the Roman Church.

For the Gallican Rite, short statements concerning the ordination of the lower orders, among them that of the ostiaries, are found in the "Statuta ecclesiæ antiqua" a collection of canons which appeared at Arles about the beginning of the sixth century. The "Sacramentarium Gelasianum" and the "Missale Francorum" contain the same rite with the prayers used on this occasion.

According to these the ostiaries are first instructed in their duties by the archdeacon; after this he brings them before the bishop who takes the keys of the church from the altar and hands them to the candidate for ordination with the words: "Fulfil thine office to show that thou knowest that thou wilt give account to God concerning the things that are locked away under these keys." Then follows a prayer for the candidate and a prayer for the occasion that the bishop pronounces over him. This ceremony was also at a later date adopted by the Roman Church in its liturgy.

In Latin Western Europe, outside of Rome, in the late Roman era and the one following, the ostiaries were still actually employed as guardians of the church buildings and of their contents. This is shown by the epitaph of one Ursatius, an ostiary of Trier. An ostiary of the church of Salona is also mentioned in an epitaph. Later, however, in the Latin Church the office of ostiary universally remained only one of the degrees of ordination and the actual work of the ostiary was transferred to the laity (sacristans, sextons, etc.).

In the ordination of ostiaries their duties are thus enumerated in the Pontifical: "Percutere cymbalum et campanam, aperire ecclesiam et sacrarium, et librum ei aperire qui prædicat" (to ring the bell, to open the church and sacristy, to open the book for the preacher). The forms of prayer for the ordination are similar to those in the old Gallican Rite.

In the East there were also doorkeepers in the service of the Church. They are enumerated as ecclesiastical persons by the Council of Laodicea (c. 343–381). Like the acolytes and exorcists, they were only appointed to serve the church, but received no actual ordination and were not regarded as belonging to the ecclesiastical hierarchy. According to the "Apostolic Constitutions" belonging to the end of the fourth century the guarding of the door of the church during the service was the duty of the deacons and subdeacons. Thus the doorkeepers exercised their office only when service was not being held.

The minor order no longer exists officially in the Eastern Catholic Churches and was abolished in the Latin Church by Pope Paul VI in his apostolic letter, Ministeria quaedam of August 15, 1972.

== See also ==
- Romanus Ostiarius
