= Major orders =

Roman Catholic Church term no longer in use

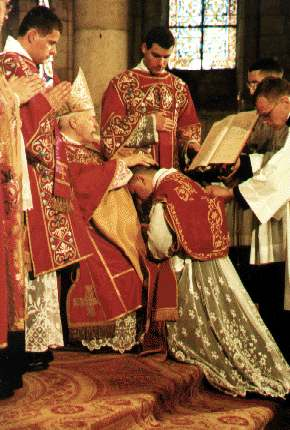
Ordination of a priest

For some centuries the Catholic Church distinguished between major orders ("greater orders"), which the Council of Trent also called holy orders, and minor orders (lesser orders). The Catechism of the Council of Trent spoke of the "several distinct orders of ministers, intended by their office to serve the priesthood, and so disposed, as that, beginning with the clerical tonsure, they may ascend gradually through the lesser to the greater orders", and stated:

Their number, according to the uniform and universal doctrine of the Catholic Church, is seven, Porter, Reader, Exorcist, Acolyte, Sub-deacon, Deacon and Priest. ... Of these, some are greater, which are called "Holy", some lesser, which are called "Minor Orders". The great or Holy Orders are Sub-deaconship, Deaconship and Priesthood; the lesser or Minor Orders are Porter, Reader, Exorcist, and Acolyte.

The Catechism of the Council of Trent thus repeats what is stated in chapter II of that Council's Decree on the Sacrament of Order, using the word "priest" to refer both to bishops and to presbyters. In chapter IV, it uses the word "priest" to refer instead to presbyters alone. It thus speaks of bishops as "superior to priests", and of "the ordination of bishops, priests, and of the other orders". In its canon VI, it declares that in the Catholic Church "there is a hierarchy by divine ordination constituted, consisting of bishops, priests, and ministers".

By his motu proprio Ministeria quaedam of 15 August 1972, Pope Paul VI decreed: "The orders hitherto called minor are henceforth to be spoken of as 'ministries'." This abandonment of the term "minor orders" automatically brought an end also to use of the term "major orders".

The same motu proprio also decreed that the Latin Church would no longer have the major order of subdiaconate, but it permitted any episcopal conference that so desired to apply the term "subdeacon" to those who hold the ministry (formerly called the minor order) of "acolyte".

For the Latin Church there are thus now only three orders, as stated in the Code of Canon Law: "The orders are the episcopate, the presbyterate, and the diaconate." These three orders are also referred to as "sacred orders" or "holy orders".
