= Anton Joseph Binterim =

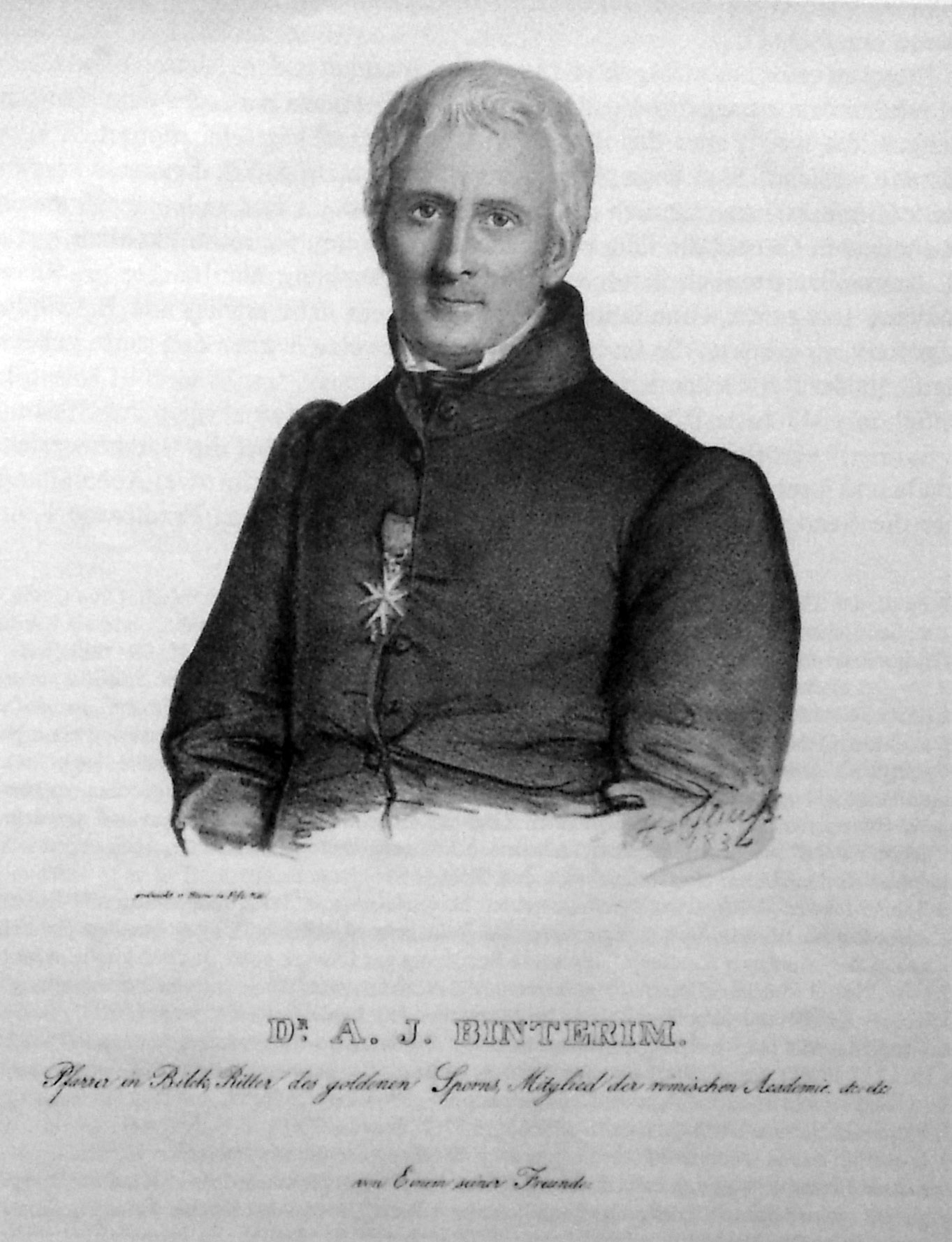
Anton Joseph Binterim

Anton Joseph Binterim (19 September 1779, Düsseldorf – 17 May 1855, Düsseldorf-Bilk) was the parish priest of Bilk from 1805 to 1855 and a prominent leader of Catholics in Prussia. He lobbied against intermarriage between Catholics and Protestants.
