= Lay cardinal =

Layman appointed as a Catholic cardinal

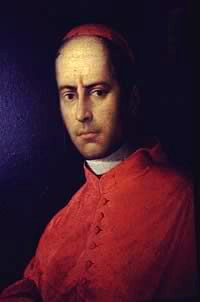
Teodolfo Mertel, the last man to have been created cardinal without first having been ordained a deacon. He was ordained to the diaconate in 1858, a few months after becoming a cardinal.

In the historical practice of the Catholic Church, a lay cardinal was a man whom the Pope appointed to the College of Cardinals while still a layman. This appointment carried with it the obligation to be ordained to a clerical order, meaning that "lay cardinal" was not a permanent state, but a term in reference to a man who was appointed cardinal prior to taking on the clerical state corresponding to that appointment.

The current law of the Catholic Church is that a man must be first ordained at least a priest in order to be considered for appointment as a cardinal.

== List of laymen who were created cardinals ==
Name	Year created cardinal	Highest clerical order received
Pope Paul III	1493	Pope
Pope Leo X	1489	Pope
Charles Borromeo	1560	Archbishop
Ferdinando I de' Medici	1562	Minor orders
Maurice of Savoy	1607	Minor orders
Francisco Gómez Rojas de Sandoval	1618	Priest
Ferdinand of Austria	1620	Minor orders
Giulio Raimondo Mazzarino	1641	Minor orders
Marino Carafa di Belvedere	1801	Resigned before being ordained
Teodolfo Mertel	1858	Deacon

== Discontinuation ==
In 1917, Pope Benedict XV promulgated the first edition of the Code of Canon Law, which included a provision that a man must be first ordained a priest prior to being considered for appointment as a cardinal.

According to The New York Times, Pope Paul VI considered making the French Catholic philosopher Jacques Maritain a cardinal in 1965.

== See also ==
- Crown cardinal
- Cardinal-Infante (disambiguation)
- Cardinal-nephew
- List of creations of cardinals
