= Antonio Piolanti =

Italian Catholic priest and theologian (1911–2001)

Antonio Piolanti (7 August 1911 – 28 September 2001) was an Italian Catholic priest and a Thomist theologian and dogmatist. He was from 1957 to 1969 Rector of the Pontifical Lateran University.

== Biography ==
Piolanti was born on 7 August 1911 in Predappio, Emilia-Romagna, Italy. He received priestly ordination in 1934. From 1938 to 1955 he was professor of theology at the Ateneo di Propaganda Fide (Pontifical Urban University). He also taught from 1945 at the Lateran University. From 1955 to 1962 he was dean of the theological faculty at the Urbania and 1957 at the Lateran University. From 1957 to 1969 Antonio Piolanti was rector of the Pontifical Lateran University.

He was advisor to the Roman Curia, as well as several congregations. He was (1969 to 2001) Vice President of the Pontificia Accademia di San Tommaso. He died on 28 September 2001 in Rome.

He founded the Divinitas publishing review in 1954.

== Writings ==
Piolanti wrote and co-wrote a number of books including;

- Dictionary of Dogmatic Theology (with Pietro Parente and Salvatore Garofalo) (1951)
- The Sacraments (1959)
- St. Thomas and Today's Theological Problems: Essays (1974)
- Il Mistero Eucaristico (1983)
