= Cardinals created by John XXIII =

Catholic appointments from 1958 to 1962

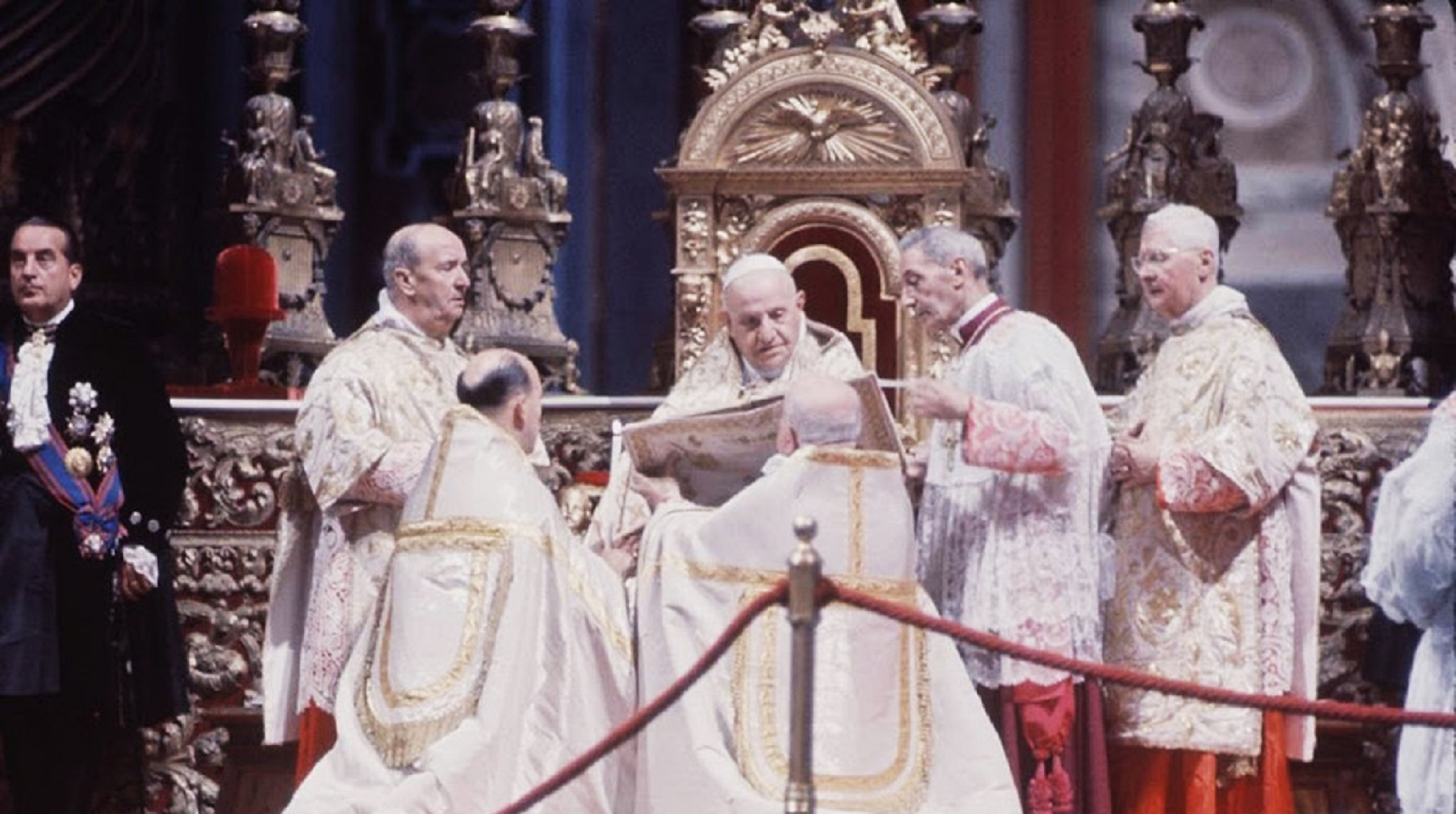
Pope John XXIII (1881–1963) presiding at the Second Vatican Council (1962–65).

Pope John XXIII (r. 1958–1963) created 52 cardinals in five consistories. Beginning at his first consistory, he expanded the size of the College beyond the limit of seventy established in 1586 and on several occasions announced that further increases should be expected. It rose to 88 in January 1961. He named three additional cardinals in pectore, that is, secretly, but did not reveal their names before his death.

In 1962 he initiated the rule that all cardinals should be bishops. He consecrated the twelve non-bishop members of the College himself in April. (Note: John codified this and other rules for the College in Cum gravissima dated 15 April 1962.) He created one cardinal who later became pope, Pope Paul VI. His cardinals included the first from Japan, Mexico, the Philippines, Uruguay, and Venezuela; Rugambwa was the first native of Africa.

John’s creation of cardinals at annual consistories was a marked departure from the periods of several years that his predecessor Pius XII allowed between consistories and a return to the frequency of earlier in the 20th century.

== 15 December 1958 ==
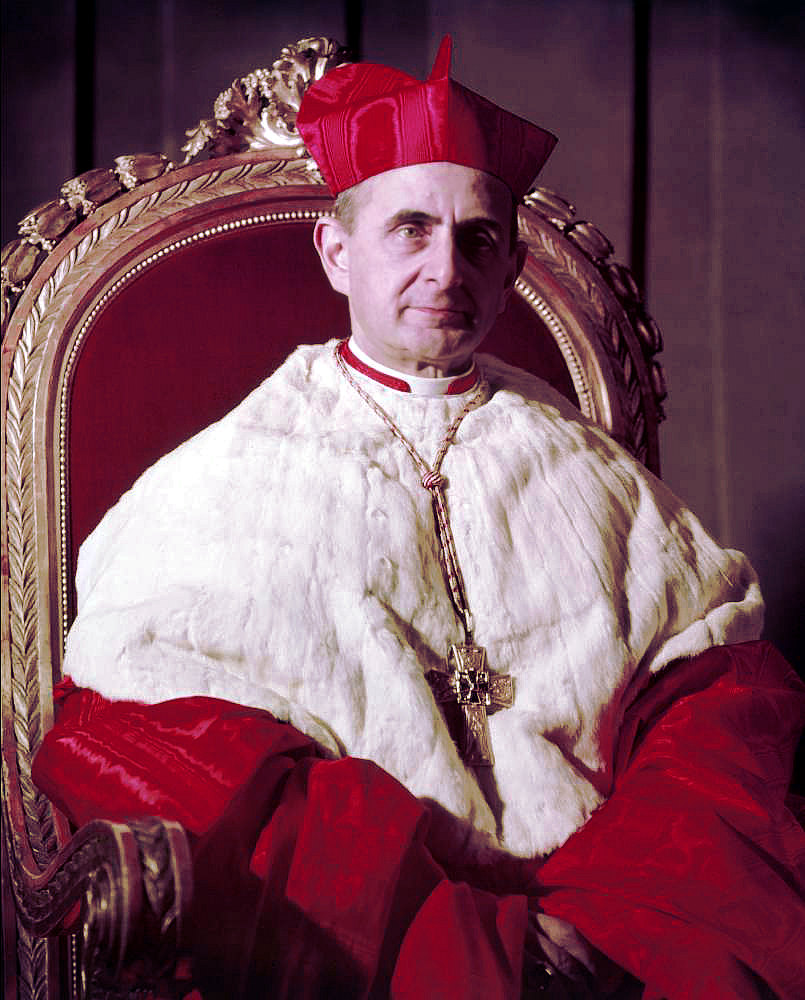
Giovanni Battista Montini (1897–1978), made a cardinal on 15 December 1958.

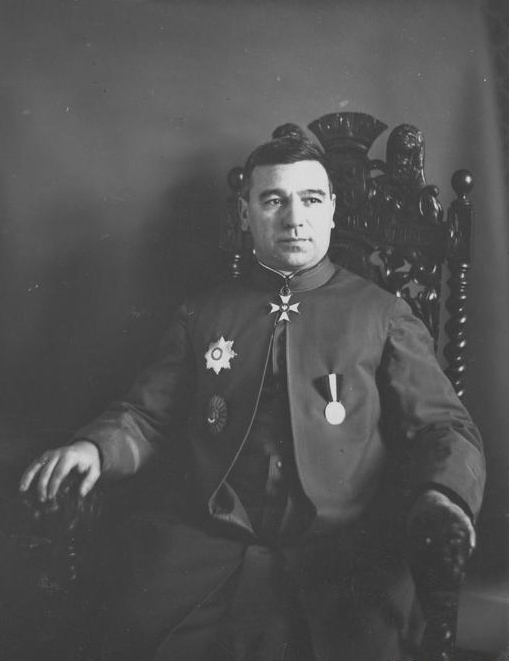
Carlo Chiarlo (1881–1964), made a cardinal on 15 December 1958.

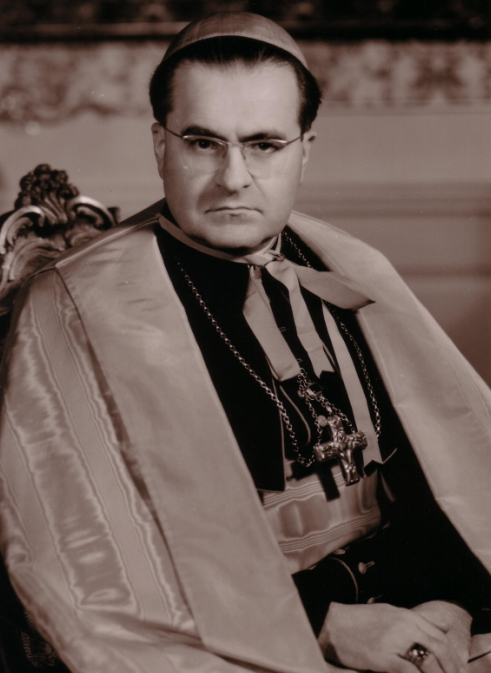
Julius Döpfner (1913–1976), made a cardinal on 15 December 1958.

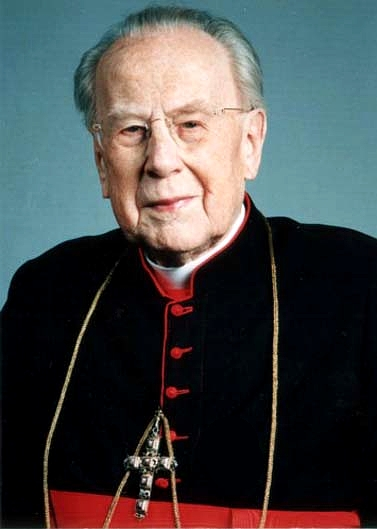
Franz König (1905–2004), made a cardinal on 15 December 1958.

Pope John announced the names of 23 new cardinals on 17 November 1958, including 13 Italians, ten of whom held offices in the Roman Curia. Though not as international a group as those named by his predecessor Pius XII, it included the first cardinals from Mexico and Uruguay. This would have increased the number of cardinals to 75, breaking the ceiling of 70 members established by Pope Sixtus V in 1586, (Note: In 1946, Pope Pius XII at his first consistory said that "the Roman Pontiffs successors of Sixtus V are not bound by his disposition if they should deem it advisable to increase or decrease that number".) but it only reached 74 because Cardinal José María Caro Rodríguez of Chile died before the consistory. When he created these cardinals, 18 of the order of cardinal priests and five cardinal deacons, at a secret consistory on 15 December, John said the increase was necessary to staff church offices properly. Church law had to be waived for the new Cardinal Cicognani to join his brother Gaetano Cicognani, a cardinal since 1953, in the College. On 17 December Pope John gave red birettas and assigned titular churches and deaconries to the twenty of the 23 who were present. (Note: Fietta received his cardinal's red biretta from Giovanni Gronchi, President of Italy, that same day. Bueno y Monreal received his from Francisco Franco in late December. Cento, Apostolic Nuncio to Portugal, received his on 30 December 1958 from Portuguese president Américo Tomás.) Cento, Fietta, and Bueno y Monreal received theirs on 12 March 1959.

Name	Title when named cardinal	Country
Giovanni Battista Montini (1897–1978) (Note: Elected as Pope Paul VI (1963–1978))	Archbishop of Milan	Italy
Giovanni Urbani (1900–1969)	Patriarch of Venice	Italy
Paolo Giobbe (1880–1972)	Apostolic Internuncio to the Netherlands	Italy
Giuseppe Fietta (1883–1960)	Apostolic Nuncio to Italy	Italy
Fernando Cento (1883–1973)	Apostolic Nuncio to Portugal	Italy
Carlo Chiarlo (1881–1964)	Apostolic Nuncio (retired)	Italy
Amleto Giovanni Cicognani (1883–1973)	Apostolic Nuncio to the United States	Italy
José Garibi y Rivera (1889–1972)	Archbishop of Guadalajara	Mexico
Antonio María Barbieri, OFM Cap (1892–1979)	Archbishop of Montevideo	Uruguay
William Godfrey (1889–1963)	Archbishop of Westminster	England
Carlo Confalonieri (1893–1986)	Secretary of the Sacred Congregation of Seminaries and Universities	Italy
Richard Cushing (1895–1970)	Archbishop of Boston	United States
Alfonso Castaldo (1890–1966)	Archbishop of Napoli	Italy
Paul Marie André Richaud (1887–1968)	Archbishop of Bordeaux	France
John Francis O'Hara (1888–1960)	Archbishop of Philadelphia	United States
José Bueno y Monreal (1904–1987)	Archbishop of Sevilla	(Francoist Spain) Spain
Franz König (1905–2004)	Archbishop of Vienna	Austria
Julius Döpfner (1913–1976)	Bishop of Berlin	West Germany
Domenico Tardini (1888–1961)	Secretary of State of Secretariat of State	Italy
Alberto di Jorio (1884–1979)	Secretary of the Sacred College of Cardinals	Italy
Francesco Bracci (1879–1967)	Secretary of the Sacred Congregation of Sacramental Discipline	Italy
Francesco Roberti (1889–1977)	Secretary of the Sacred Congregation of the Council	Italy
André-Damien-Ferdinand Jullien (1882–1964)	Dean of the Sacred Roman Rota	France

== 14 December 1959 ==
Pope John announced the names of eight new cardinals on 16 November 1959, increasing the size of the College to 79, including 31 Italians. On 14 December 1959, John created four cardinal priests and four cardinal deacons, and on 17 December he gave red birettas and titular churches and deaconries to seven of them. (Note: Marella, papal nuncio to France, received his biretta in Paris from President Charles de Gaulle.) He did the same for Marella on 31 March 1960.

Name	Title when named cardinal	Country
Paolo Marella (1895–1984)	Apostolic Nuncio to France	Italy
Gustavo Testa (1886–1969)	Apostolic Nuncio to Switzerland	Italy
Aloisius Joseph Muench (1889–1962)	Bishop of Fargo and Apostolic Nuncio to Germany	United States
Albert Gregory Meyer (1903–1965)	Archbishop of Chicago	United States
Arcadio Larraona Saralegui (1887–1973)	Secretary of the Sacred Congregation of Religious	(Francoist Spain) Spain
Francesco Morano (1872–1968)	Secretary of the Supreme Tribunal of the Apostolic Signatura	Italy
William Theodore Heard (1884–1973)	Dean of the Sacred Roman Rota	Scotland
Augustin Bea (1881–1968)	Rector emeritus of the Pontifical Biblical Institute	West Germany

== 28 March 1960 ==
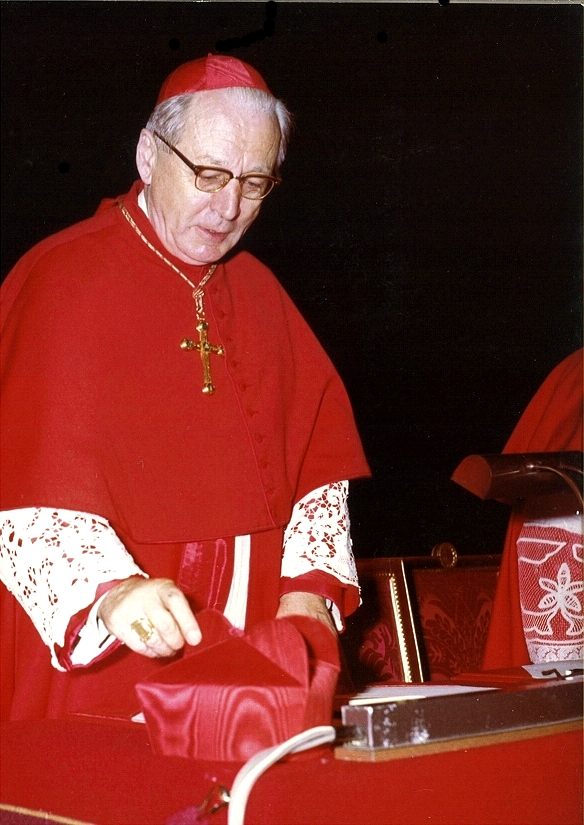
Bernardus Johannes Alfrink (1900–1987), made a cardinal on 28 March 1960.

Pope John announced the names of seven new cardinals on 3 March 1960, among them the first Japanese (Doi) and Filipino (Santos) cardinals and the first black cardinal of the modern era (Rugambwa). At the secret consistory on 28 March, he noted the historic significance of their inclusion by addressing them: "Dear and venerable brothers of Tokyo, Manila and Rutabo, please tell your populations that the Pope loves them." He named three additional cardinals in pectore, keeping their identities secret. He created six cardinal priests and one cardinal deacon (Bacci) on that day, and on 31 March gave them all their birettas, six their titles and one his deaconry. Without those not named publicly, this consistory brought the number of cardinals to 85. The Italians numbered 33.

Because Pope John failed to reveal the names of the three cardinals created in pectore before his death, their appointments never took effect.

Name	Title when named cardinal	Country
Luigi Traglia (1895–1977)	Vicegerent for the Vicariate of Rome	Italy
Peter Doi (1892–1970)	Archbishop of Tokyo	Japan
Joseph-Charles Lefèbvre (1892–1973)	Archbishop of Bourges	France
Bernardus Johannes Alfrink (1900–1987)	Archbishop of Utrecht	Netherlands
Rufino Santos (1908–1973)	Archbishop of Manila	Philippines
Laurean Rugambwa (1912–1997)	Bishop of Rutabo	(Tanganyika Territory) Tanganyika
Antonio Bacci (1885–1971)	Secretary of the Secretariat of Briefs to Princes	Italy

== 16 January 1961 ==
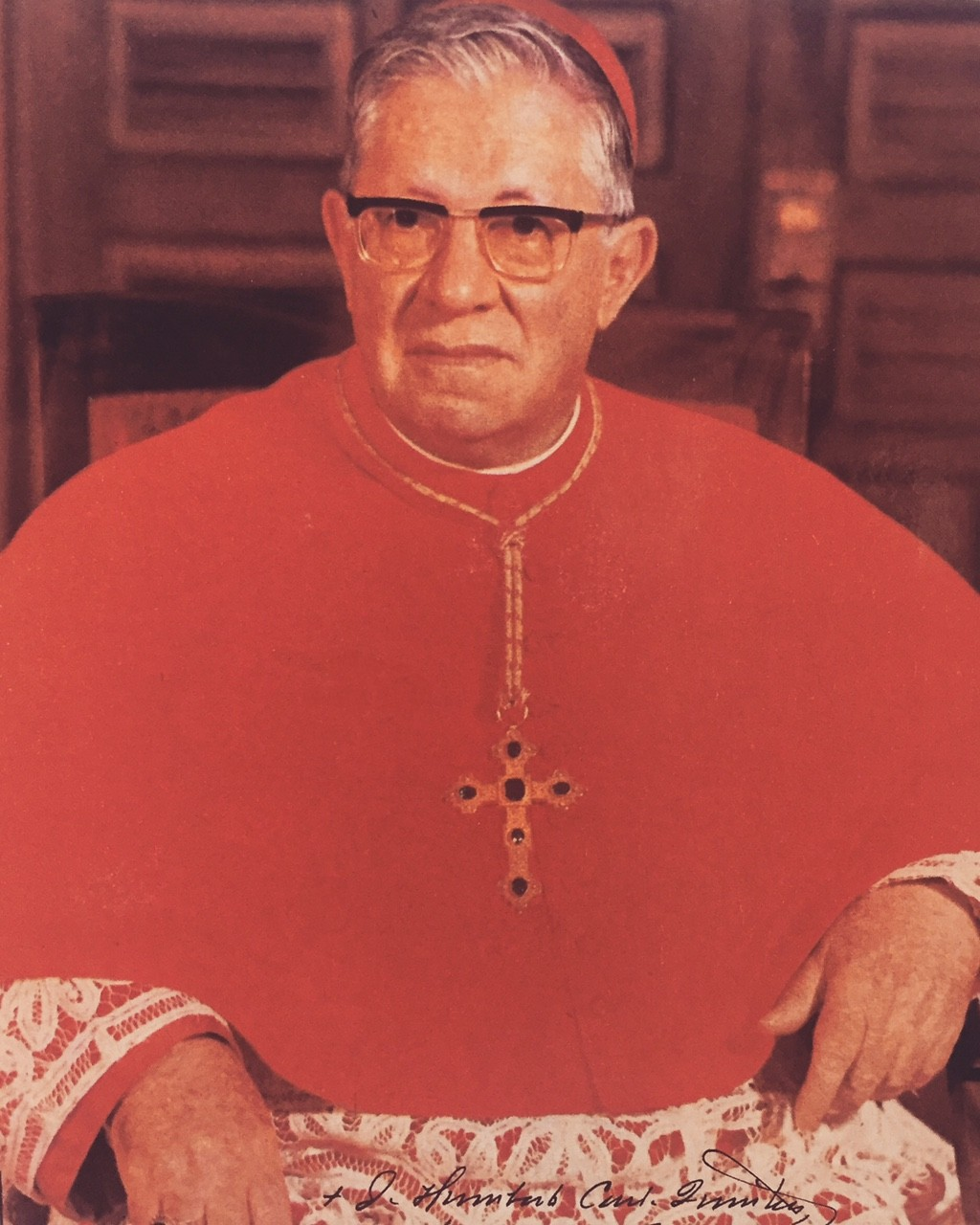
José Humberto Quintero Parra (1902–1984), made a cardinal on 16 January 1961.

On 16 December 1960, Pope John announced the names of four new cardinals, including the first Venezuelan. On 16 January 1961, he created them cardinal priests, and they received their red hats and their titular church assignments on 19 January. Following this consistory there were 88 cardinals, 32 of them Italians.

Name	Title when named cardinal	Country
Joseph Ritter (1892–1967)	Archbishop of St. Louis	United States
José Quintero Parra (1902–1984)	Archbishop of Caracas	Venezuela
Luis Concha Córdoba (1891–1975)	Archbishop of Bogota	Colombia
Giuseppe Ferretto (1899–1973) (Note: At the previous conclave in 1958, Ferretto had been mentioned as one of the cardinals who might have been named in pectore.)	Secretary of the Sacred College of Cardinals	Italy

== 19 March 1962 ==
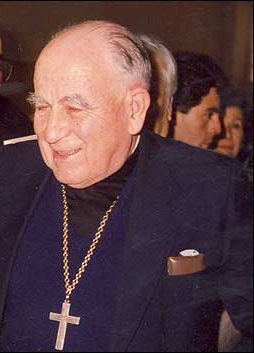
Raúl Silva Henríquez (1907–99), made a cardinal on 19 March 1962.

Pope John announced the names of ten new cardinals on 17 February 1962. They included an Eastern-rite Catholic, the Syrian-born Coussa, and a new youngest member of the College of Cardinals, Landázuri, aged 48. Pope John created them eight cardinal priests and two cardinal deacons on 19 March and gave eight of them their titles and deaconries on 22 March.· The other two, Panico and Antoniutti, the Apostolic Nuncios to Portugal and Spain, received theirs on 24 May 1962. The consistory on 19 March left the college with 87 cardinals, including thirty Italian, eight French, six Spanish, and five from the United States.

On 19 March Pope John also announced that he would consecrate as bishops the twelve members of the College not yet bishops, including two of the newest cardinals, Browne and Albareda, and a veteran of the Roman Curia Alfredo Ottaviani.

Name	Title when named cardinal	Country
José da Costa Nunes (1880–1976)	Vice-Camerlengo of the Holy Roman Church of Reverend Apostolic Camera	Portugal
Giovanni Panico (1895–1962)	Apostolic Nuncio to Portugal	Italy
Ildebrando Antoniutti (1898–1974)	Apostolic Nuncio to Spain	Italy
Efrem Forni (1889–1976)	Apostolic Nuncio to Belgium and Apostolic Nuncio to Luxembourg	Italy
Juan Landázuri Ricketts (1913–1997)	Archbishop of Lima	Peru
Gabriel Acacius Coussa (1897–1962)	Pro-Secretary of the Sacred Congregation for the Oriental Churches	Syria
Raúl Silva Henríquez (1907–1999)	Archbishop of Santiago	Chile
Leo Joseph Suenens (1904–1996)	Archbishop of Mechelen-Brussels	Belgium
Michael Browne (1887–1971)	Master of the Order emeritus of the Order of Preachers	Ireland
Joaquín Albareda y Ramoneda (1892–1966)	Prefect of the Vatican Apostolic Library	(Francoist Spain) Spain

== See also ==
- Cardinals created by Pius XII (previous)
- Cardinals created by Paul VI (successor)
