= Cardinals created by Paul VI =

Catholic appointments from 1965 to 1977

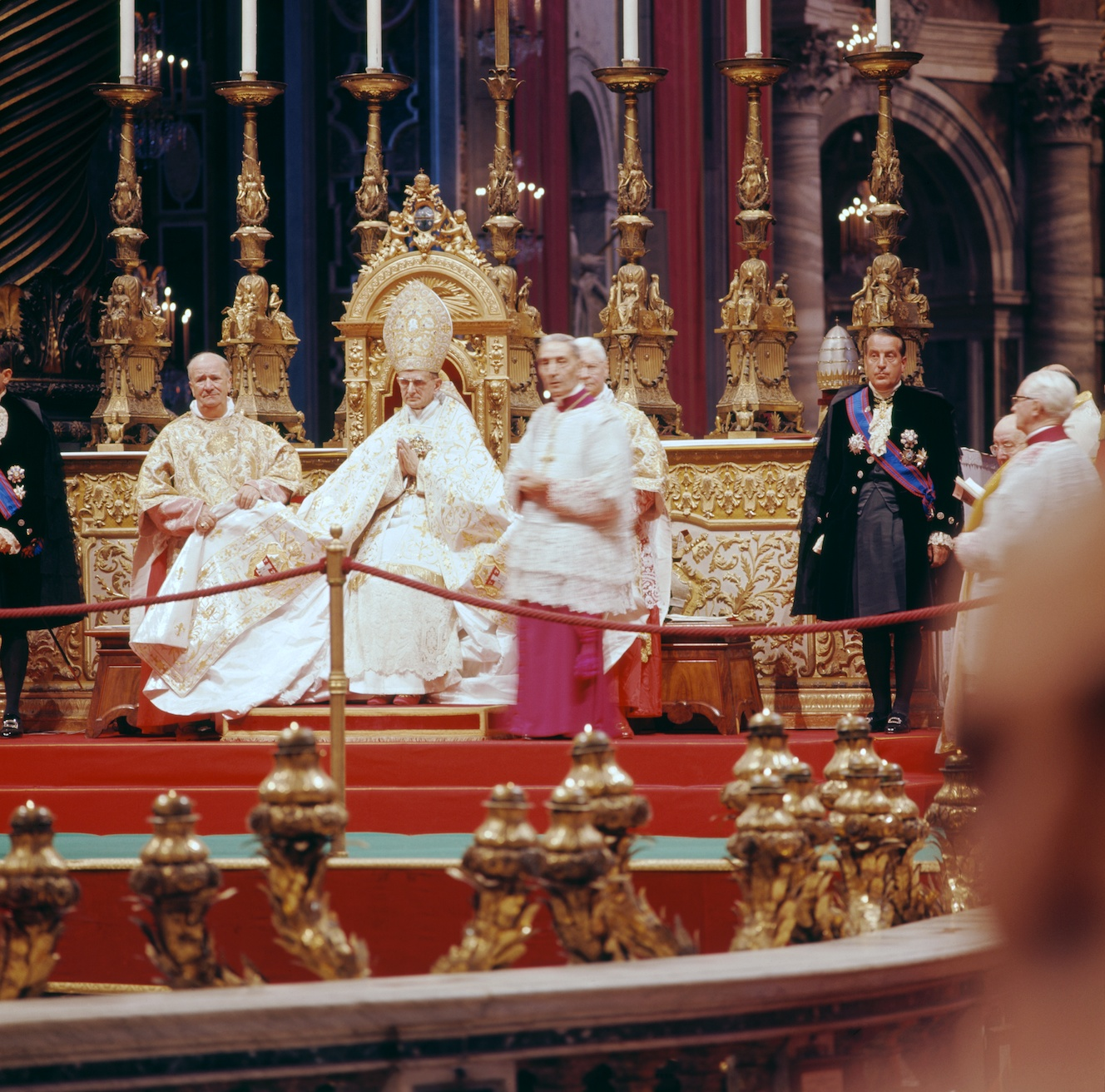
Pope Paul VI (1897–1978) presiding at the Second Vatican Council (1962–65).

Pope Paul VI (r. 1963–1978) created 143 cardinals in six consistories. His predecessor Pope John XXIII had disregarded the centuries-long tradition that limited the College of Cardinals to seventy members, increasing its size to as high as 88 in 1961. Paul continued this practice, and with his appointments the College grew to 103 in 1965, 118 in 1967, 134 in 1969. He then instituted a new rule that diminished the significance of the size of the College. In November 1970 he announced that as of 1 January 1971 only a cardinal who had not yet reached his 80th birthday would be allowed to enter a conclave. When the 1973 consistory increased the size of the College to 145, the number of those under 80 who constituted the cardinal electors was 117. In 1975, he set the maximum number of cardinal electors at 120. Each of his later consistories in 1976 and 1977 brought the number of electors to the full complement of 120.

Three of those Paul named a cardinal became pope, Pope John Paul I, Pope John Paul II, and Pope Benedict XVI, who was the last survivor of the cardinals whom Paul named. Among the others he made cardinal were the first from Benin (Gantin), the Dominican Republic (Beras Rojas), Indonesia (Darmojuwono), Madagascar (Rakotomalala), Nigeria (Ekandem), Senegal (Thiandoum), Sri Lanka (Cooray), Switzerland (Journet), and Vietnam (Trịnh Như Khuê).

== 22 February 1965 ==
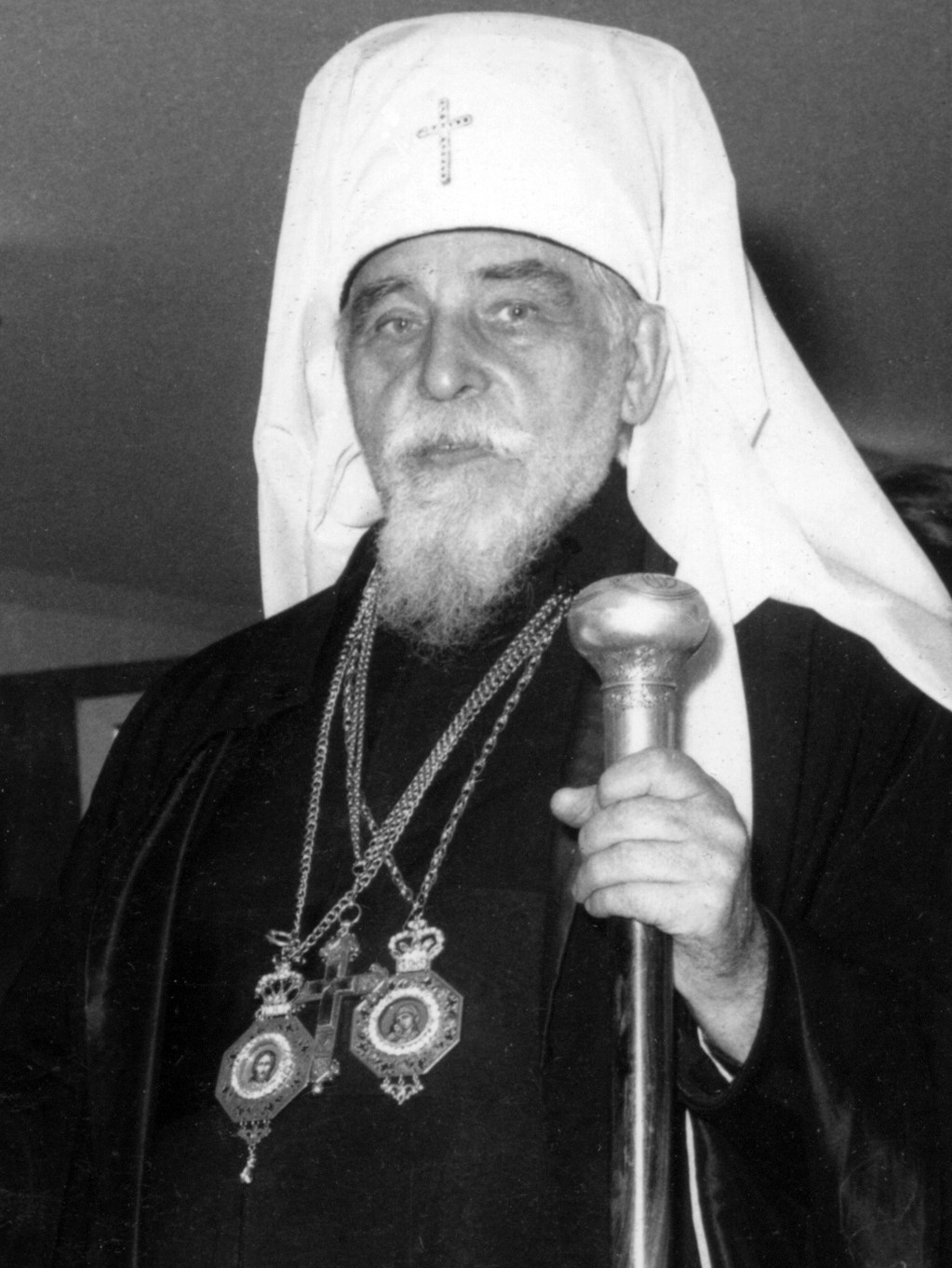
Josyf Slipyj (1892–1984), made a cardinal on 22 February 1965.

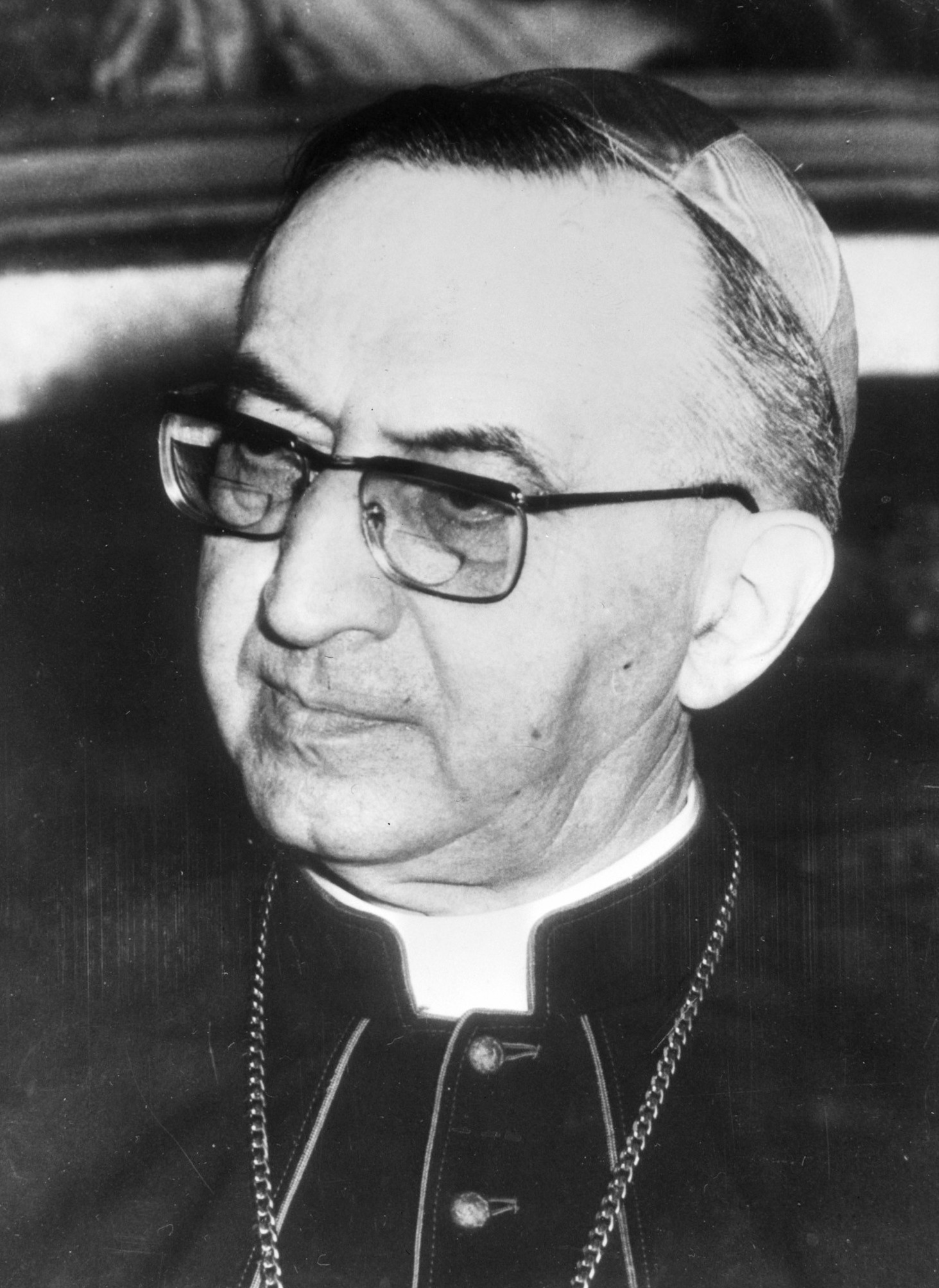
Jean-Marie Villot (1905–1979), made a cardinal on 22 February 1965.

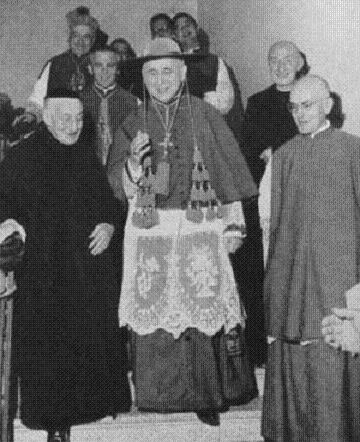
Giovanni Colombo (1902–1992), made a cardinal on 22 February 1965.

When Paul VI added members to the College for the first time, he increased its numbers from 76 to 103, raising the number of Italians from 26 to 32. The 27 he named included the first cardinal from Sri Lanka and Switzerland, the second black African, and three Eastern Rite Patriarchs. He assigned the patriarchs to the College's highest rank, cardinal bishop, which was previously reserved to six cardinals assigned as bishops of sees near Rome. He said that the growth of the College did not suggest a lesser role for the world's bishops, but reflected the fact that "The proportions of the Church are no longer those of the 16th century".

The ceremonies were reduced from four to two, though still scheduled to extend over four days. At the second, public ceremony, the pope and the new cardinals concelebrated Mass for the first time on such an occasion and Paul, after addressing them briefly in Latin, spoke in Italian "because it is easier for us" and then in French, English, German, and Spanish. The language of the rite was adapted slightly for the patriarchs, and the new cardinals did not demonstrate their obedience by prostrating themselves at the pope's feet. Before the consistory, the Vatican restricted the use of silk in cardinals' attire.

Pope Paul created 27 cardinals on 22 February: the three patriarchs joined the order of cardinal bishops, twenty became cardinal priests, and four cardinal deacons. The patriarchs' relationship to their sees remained unchanged. On 25 February he assigned the others their titles and deaconries, except for Herrera Oria, who received his red biretta from Spain's Francisco Franco on 1 March and then his titular church assignment from Pope Paul on 26 March.

Name	Title when named cardinal	Country
Maximos IV Sayegh (1878–1967)	Patriarch of Antioch of the Melkites	Syria
Paul Peter Meouchi (1894–1975)	Patriarch of Antioch of the Maronites	Lebanon
Stéphanos I Sidarouss (1904–1987)	Patriarch of Alexandria of the Copts	Egypt
Josyf Slipyj (1892–1984)	Major-Archbishop of Lviv-Galicia	Ukrainian SSR (Note: Part of Soviet Union at the time)
Lorenz Jaeger (1892–1975)	Archbishop of Paderborn	West Germany
Thomas Cooray (1901–1988)	Archbishop of Colombo in Ceylon	(Sri Lanka) Ceylon
Josef Beran (1888–1969)	Archbishop of Prague	Czechoslovakia
Maurice Roy (1905–1985)	Archbishop of Quebec	Canada
Joseph-Marie Martin (1891–1976)	Archbishop of Rouen	France
Owen McCann (1907–1994)	Archbishop of Cape Town	South Africa
Léon-Étienne Duval (1903–1996)	Archbishop of Algiers	Algeria
Ermenegildo Florit (1901–1985)	Archbishop of Firenze	Italy
Franjo Šeper (1905–1981)	Archbishop of Zagreb	Yugoslavia
John Heenan (1905–1975)	Archbishop of Westminster	England
Jean-Marie Villot (1905–1979)	Archbishop of Lyon	France
Paul Zoungrana (1917–2000)	Archbishop of Ouagadougou	Upper Volta
Lawrence Shehan (1898–1984)	Archbishop of Baltimore	United States
Enrico Dante (1884–1967)	Master of Papal Liturgical Celebrations of Prefecture for Pontifical Ceremonies	Italy
Cesare Zerba (1892–1973)	Secretary Emeritus of Sacred Congregation of Sacramental Discipline	Italy
Agnelo Rossi (1913–1995)	Archbishop of São Paulo	Brazil
Giovanni Colombo (1902–1992)	Archbishop of Milan	Italy
William Conway (1913–1977)	Archbishop of Armagh	Ireland
Ángel Herrera Oria (1886–1968)	Bishop of Malaga	(Francoist Spain) Spain
Federico Callori di Vignale (1890–1971)	Prefect of Prefecture of the Holy Apostolic Palaces	Italy
Josef-Léon Cardijn (1882–1967)	Founder of Young Christian Workers	Belgium
Charles Journet (1891–1975)	Theologian	Switzerland
Giulio Bevilacqua (1881–1965)	Priest from the Diocese of Brescia	Italy

== 26 June 1967 ==
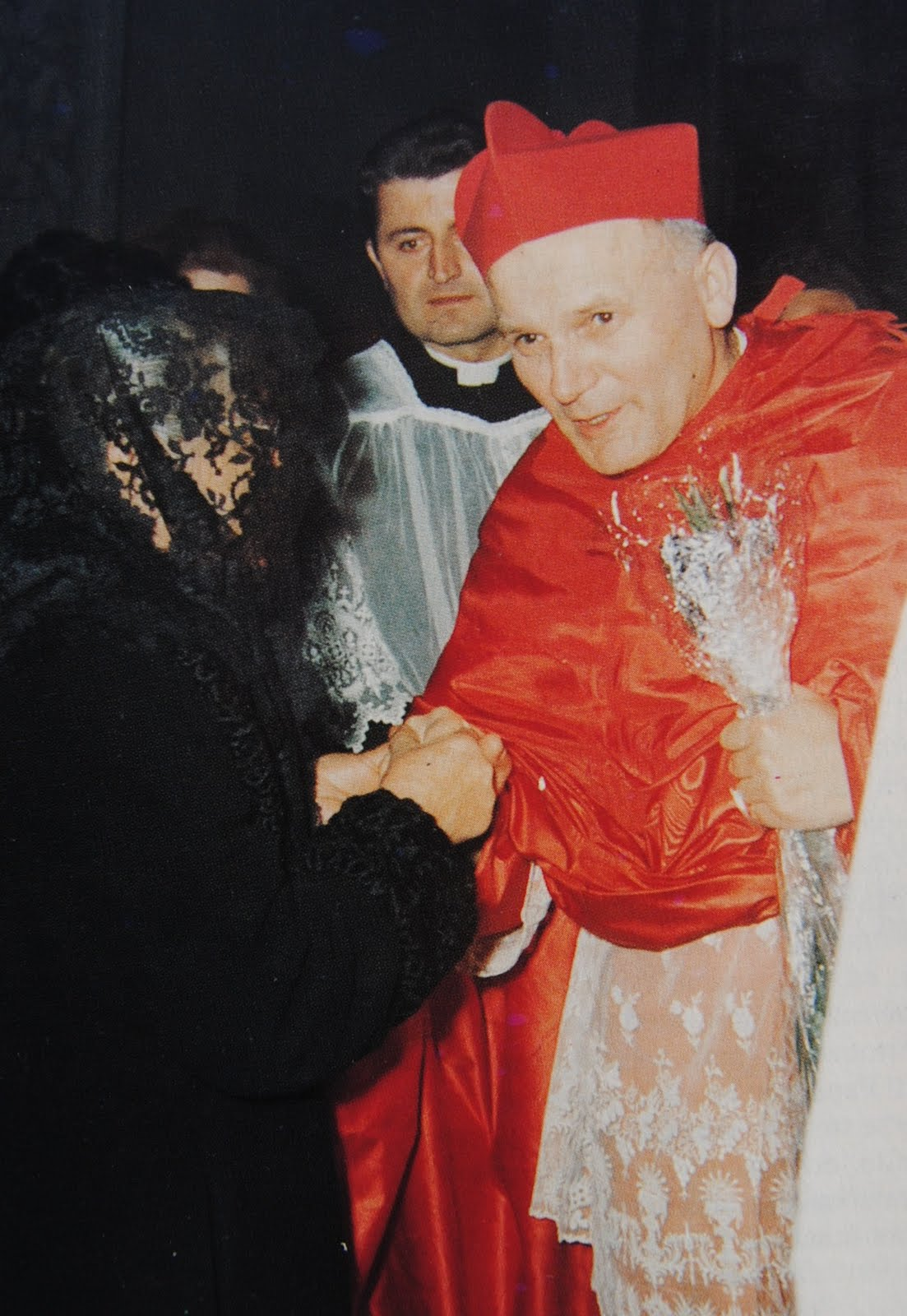
Karol Wojtyła (1920–2005), made cardinal on 26 June 1967 and elected as Pope John Paul II on 16th October 1978

Pope Paul announced the names of 27 new cardinals on 29 May 1967, and the consistory that followed increased the College from 93 to 118 members, a new high. Twenty were European, including 12 Italians. (Note: The number was expected to be 120, but Cardinal Joseph Ritter died on 10 June and Cardinal Ernesto Ruffini died on 11 June.) He again simplified the cardinals' attire and reduced the number of their attendants, but reorganized the ceremonies into three events.

On 26 June Pope Paul created 23 cardinals of the order of cardinal priests and four cardinal deacons. Some 24 of the 27 assembled in the Pius XII auditorium and there received notes that Paul had named them in the closed ceremony. (Note: Previously each new cardinal waited in a different location in Rome and messengers delivered their notice individually.) Pope Paul gave 24 of them their titular assignments and deaconries on 29 June. The other three, papal nuncios to Italy (Grano), Portugal (Fürstenberg), and Spain (Riberi), followed the custom of receiving their notices and their red birettas from the head of the government to which they were posted. Pope Paul gave them their birettas and titular churches on 15 July.

Name	Title when named cardinal	Country
Nicolás Fasolino (1887–1969)	Archbishop of Santa Fe	Argentina
Antonio Riberi (1897–1967)	Apostolic Nuncio to Spain	Monaco
Giuseppe Beltrami (1889–1973)	Apostolic Internuncio to the Netherlands	Italy
Alfredo Pacini (1888–1967)	Apostolic Nuncio to Switzerland	Italy
Gabriel-Marie Garrone (1901–1994)	Pro-Prefect of Sacred Congregation for Catholic Education	France
Patrick O'Boyle (1896–1987)	Archbishop of Washington	United States
Egidio Vagnozzi (1906–1980)	Apostolic Delegate to United States of America	Italy
Maximilien de Furstenberg (1904–1988)	Apostolic Nuncio to Portugal	Netherlands
Antonio Samorè (1905–1983)	Secretary of Sacred Congregation for Extraordinary Ecclesiastical Affairs	Italy
Francesco Carpino (1905–1993)	Pro-Prefect of Sacred Congregation for Sacramental Discipline	Italy
José Clemente Maurer (1900–1990)	Archbishop of Sucre	Bolivia
Pietro Parente (1891–1986)	Secretary of Sacred Congregation for the Doctrine of the Faith	Italy
Carlo Grano (1887–1976)	Head of Protocol Emeritus of Secretariat of State	Italy
Angelo Dell'Acqua (1903–1972)	Substitute for General Affairs of Secretariat of State	Italy
Dino Staffa (1906–1977)	Pro-Prefect of Supreme Tribunal of the Apostolic Signatura	Italy
Pericle Felici (1911–1982)	President of Pontifical Commission for the Revision of the Code of Canon Law	Italy
John Krol (1910–1996)	Archbishop of Philadelphia	United States
Pierre Veuillot (1913–1968)	Archbishop of Paris	France
John Cody (1907–1982)	Archbishop of Chicago	United States
Corrado Ursi (1908–2003)	Archbishop of Napoli	Italy
Alfred Bengsch (1921–1979)	Archbishop of Berlin	West Germany
Justinus Darmojuwono (1914–1994)	Archbishop of Semarang	Indonesia
Karol Wojtyła (1920–2005) (Note: Elected as Pope John Paul II (1978–2005))	Archbishop of Krakow	Poland
Michele Pellegrino (1903–1986)	Archbishop of Turin	Italy
Alexandre Renard (1906–1983)	Archbishop of Paris	France
Francis Brennan (1894–1968)	Dean of Sacred Roman Rota	United States
Benno Gut (1897–1970)	Abbot Primate of the Benedictine Confederation of the Order of Saint Benedict	Switzerland

== 28 April 1969 ==
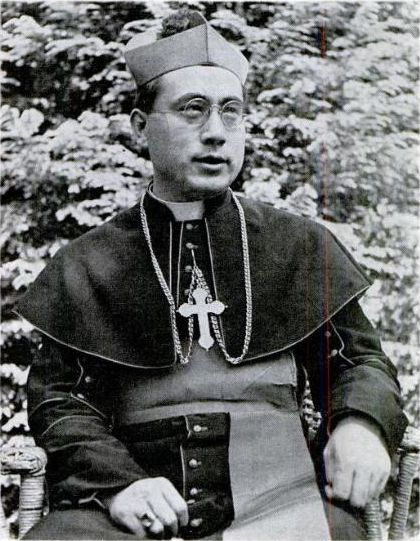
Paul Yü Pin (1901–1978), made a cardinal on 28 April 1969.

On 29 March 1969, Pope Paul announced he would increase the size of the College to 134 at a consistory on 28 April. He named 33 new cardinals from 19 countries, the largest group of new cardinals ever created at a consistory until then (later surpassed when John Paul II created 44 cardinals in 2001), and withheld the names of two more. As part of three ceremonies, a new procedure required each to swear an oath of secrecy to "not divulge to their damage or discredit the councils entrusted to me, either directly or indirectly, without the consent of the Holy See". (Note: The new cardinals assembled in three locations outside the Vatican to be notified the pope had announced their names in the consistory.)

On 28 April 1969, Pope Paul created 24 cardinals of the order of cardinal priests and nine of the order of cardinal deacons. On 30 April he gave them their red birettas and assigned their titular churches and deaconries. Of the two cardinals he created in pectore, he revealed the name of Štěpán Trochta on 5 March 1973, and at the same time he announced that the other was Iuliu Hossu of Rumania, who died in 1970 without being recognized as a cardinal.

Name	Title when named cardinal	Country
Paul Yü Pin (1901–1978)	Archbishop of Nanjing	China
Alfredo Scherer (1903–1996)	Archbishop of Porto Alegre	Brazil
Julio Rosales (1906–1983)	Archbishop of Cebu	Philippines
Gordon Gray (1910–1993)	Archbishop of Saint Andrews and Edinburgh	Scotland
Peter McKeefry (1899–1973)	Archbishop of Wellington	New Zealand
Miguel Darío Miranda y Gómez (1895–1986)	Archbishop of Mexico	Mexico
Joseph Parecattil (1912–1987)	Archbishop of Ernakulam	India
John Francis Dearden (1907–1988)	Archbishop of Detroit	United States
François Marty (1904–1994)	Archbishop of Paris	France
Jérôme Rakotomalala (1914–1975)	Archbishop of Tananarive	Madagascar
George Bernard Flahiff (1905–1989)	Archbishop of Winnipeg	Canada
Paul Gouyon (1910–2000)	Archbishop of Rennes	France
Mario Casariego y Acevedo (1909–1983)	Archbishop of Guatemala	Guatemala
Vicente Enrique y Tarancón (1907–1994)	Archbishop of Toledo	(Francoist Spain) Spain
Joseph Malula (1917–1989)	Archbishop of Kinshasa	(Republic of the Congo (Léopoldville)) Congo
Pablo Muñoz Vega (1903–1994)	Archbishop of Quito	Ecuador
Antonio Poma (1910–1985)	Archbishop of Bologna	Italy
John Carberry (1904–1998)	Archbishop of St. Louis	United States
Terence Cooke (1921–1983)	Archbishop of New York	United States
Stephen Kim Sou-hwan (1922–2009)	Archbishop of Seoul	South Korea
Arturo Tabera Araoz (1903–1975)	Archbishop of Pamplona	(Francoist Spain) Spain
Eugênio Sales (1920–2012)	Archbishop of São Salvador da Bahia	Brazil
Joseph Höffner (1906–1987)	Archbishop of Cologne	West Germany
John Wright (1909–1979)	Bishop of Pittsburgh	United States
Paolo Bertoli (1908–2001)	Apostolic Nuncio to France	Italy
Sebastiano Baggio (1913–1993)	Apostolic Nuncio to Brazil	Italy
Silvio Oddi (1910–2001)	Apostolic Nuncio to Luxembourg and Apostolic Nuncio to Belgium	Italy
Giuseppe Paupini (1907–1992)	Apostolic Nuncio to Colombia	Italy
Giacomo Violardo (1898–1978)	Secretary of Sacred Congregation for Sacramental Discipline	Italy
Johannes Willebrands (1909–2006)	Secretary of Secretariat for Christian Unity	Netherlands
Mario Nasalli Rocca di Corneliano (1903–1988)	Prefect of Prefecture of the Apostolic Palaces	Italy
Sergio Guerri (1905–1992)	Secretary of Administration of the Patrimony of the Apostolic See	Italy
Jean Daniélou (1905–1974)	Theologian	France

=== Cardinal in pectore ===
Name	Title when named cardinal	Country	Revealed as Cardinal
Štěpán Trochta (1905–1974)	Bishop of Litoměřice	Czechoslovakia	5 March 1973 (Note: Trochta received his red biretta and titular church on 12 April 1973.)

== 5 March 1973 ==
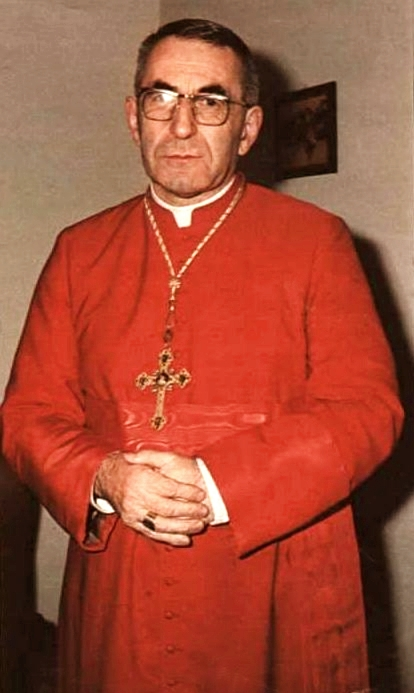
Albino Luciani (1912–1978), made cardinal on 5 March 1973, and elected as Pope John Paul I on August 26th 1978.

On 2 February 1973, Pope Paul released the names of thirty new cardinals from 17 countries. The consistory on 5 March brought the number of cardinals to 145, with 117 young enough to serve as cardinal electors. (Note: When the consistory was announced, observers calculated 145 cardinals and 116 electors. Before the consistory, Cardinal Achille Lienart died at age 89. But the announcement of Cardinal Trochta added a cardinal elector.) The College had never been larger before, but the size of 145 would regularly be surpassed from 1985 on. The Vatican announced on 12 February that the ceremonies for creating cardinals would be simplied and shortened. Each cardinal's red hat would be delivered by messenger, not ceremoniously imposed by the pope.

At the consistory on 5 March, a one-day ceremony that replaced a series of ceremonies spread across five days, Pope Paul created 24 cardinals of the order of cardinal priests and six of the order of cardinal priests. He gave red birettas and titular church and deaconry assignments to the 29 who were present, all but Jubany Arnau whose health prevented him from attending. (Note: Narcís Jubany Arnau received his biretta and on 7 June 1973. His titular church is not recorded.) He revealed the names of two prelates he had made cardinals in pectore in 1969: Stepan Trochta of Czechoslovakia and Iuliu Hossu of Rumania, who died in 1970. He discussed plans to modify procedures for papal elections, as he later did by limiting the number of electors to 120. He mentioned other ideas he never implemented like adding as voters the patriarchs of the Eastern Rite churches even if not cardinals and allowing the leadership of the Synod of Bishops to participate as electors.

Name	Title when named cardinal	Country
Albino Luciani (1912–1978) (Note: Elected as Pope John Paul I (1978))	Patriarch of Venice	Italy
António Ribeiro (1928–1998)	Patriarch of Lisbon	Portugal
Sergio Pignedoli (1910–1980)	Secretary of Sacred Congregation for the Evangelisation of Peoples	Italy
James Knox (1914–1983)	Archbishop of Melbourne	Australia
Luigi Raimondi (1912–1975)	Apostolic Delegate to the United States	Italy
Umberto Mozzoni (1904–1983)	Apostolic Nuncio to Brazil	Argentina
Avelar Brandão Vilela (1912–1986)	Archbishop of São Salvador da Bahia	Brazil
Joseph Cordeiro (1918–1994)	Archbishop of Karachi	Pakistan
Aníbal Muñoz Duque (1908–1987)	Archbishop of Bogota	Colombia
Bolesław Kominek (1903–1974)	Archbishop of Wrocław	Poland
Paul-Pierre Philippe (1905–1984)	Secretary of Sacred Congregation for the Doctrine of the Faith	France
Pietro Palazzini (1912–2000)	Secretary of Sacred Congregation for Clergy	Italy
Luis Aponte Martínez (1922–2012)	Archbishop of San Juan de Puerto Rico	Puerto Rico
Raúl Francisco Primatesta (1919–2006)	Archbishop of Cordoba	Argentina
Salvatore Pappalardo (1918–2006)	Archbishop of Palermo	Italy
Ferdinando Giuseppe Antonelli (1896–1993)	Secretary of Sacred Congregation for the Causes of Saints	Italy
Marcelo González Martín (1918–2004)	Archbishop of Toledo	(Francoist Spain) Spain
Louis-Jean Guyot (1907–1988)	Archbishop of Toulouse	France
Ugo Poletti (1914–1997)	Pro-Vicar General for the Vicariate of Rome	Italy
Timothy Manning (1909–1989)	Archbishop of Los Angeles	United States
Paul Yoshigoro Taguchi (1902–1978)	Archbishop of Osaka	Japan
Maurice Michael Otunga (1923–2003)	Archbishop of Nairobi	Kenya
José Salazar López (1910–1991)	Archbishop of Guadalajara	Mexico
Émile Biayenda (1927–1977)	Archbishop of Brazzaville	PR Congo
Humberto Sousa Medeiros (1915–1983)	Archbishop of Boston	United States
Paulo Evaristo Arns (1921–2016)	Archbishop of São Paulo	Brazil
James Darcy Freeman (1907–1991)	Archbishop of Sydney	Australia
Narcís Jubany Arnau (1913–1996)	Archbishop of Barcelona	(Francoist Spain) Spain
Hermann Volk (1903–1988)	Bishop of Mainz	West Germany
Pio Taofinu'u (1923–2006)	Bishop of Apia	Samoa

== 24 May 1976 ==
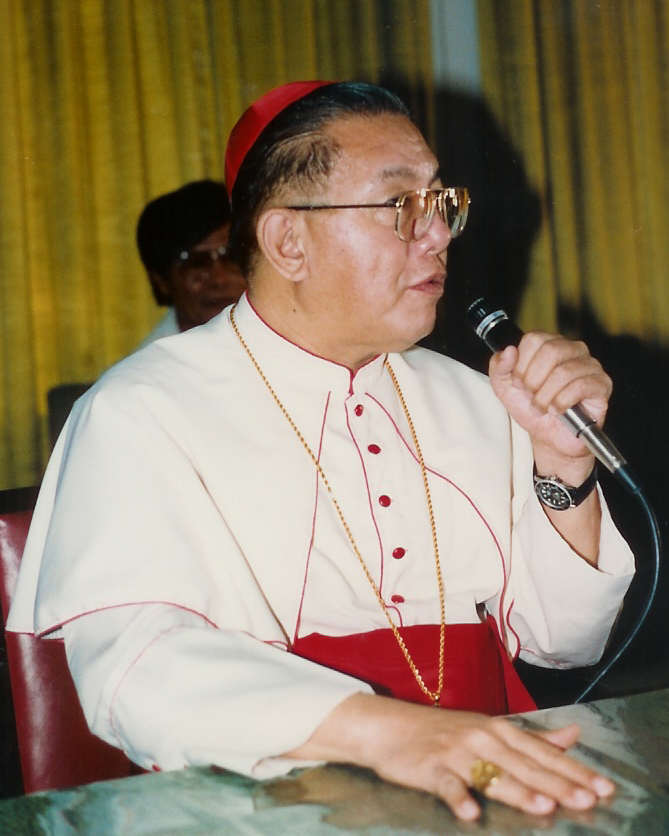
Jaime Sin (1928–2005), made a cardinal on 24 May 1976.

On 27 April 1976, Pope Paul announced plan to create 19 cardinals on 24 May 1976. He said he was not announcing the names of two more he would make cardinals in pectore. In the event, Trin Nhu Khue, Archbishop of Hanoi, was able to attend the ceremony, leaving only one name secret. On 24 May Pope Paul created twenty cardinals, assigning titular churches to fourteen cardinal priests and deaconries to six cardinal deacons. (Note: The Acta Apostolicae Sedis mistakenly fails to include Bafile among the deacons (pp. 378–9), but records his deaconry (p. 385).)

The appointments brought the number of cardinal electors to 120 and number of cardinals to 137. He had set the maximum number of electors at 120 in October 1975 in Romano Pontifici eligendo.

Name	Title when named cardinal	Country
Octavio Beras Rojas (1906–1990)	Archbishop of Santo Domingo	Dominican Republic
Opilio Rossi (1910–2004)	Apostolic Nuncio to Austria	Italy
Giuseppe Sensi (1907–2001)	Apostolic Nuncio to Portugal	Italy
Juan Carlos Aramburu (1912–2004)	Archbishop of Buenos Aires	Argentina
Corrado Bafile (1903–2005)	Pro-Prefect of Sacred Congregation for the Causes of Saints	Italy
Hyacinthe Thiandoum (1921–2004)	Archbishop of Dakar	Senegal
Emmanuel Nsubuga (1914–1991)	Archbishop of Kampala	Uganda
Joseph Schröffer (1903–1983)	Secretary of Sacred Congregation for Catholic Education	West Germany
Lawrence Picachy (1916–1992)	Archbishop of Calcutta	India
Jaime Sin (1928–2005)	Archbishop of Manila	Philippines
William Wakefield Baum (1926–2015)	Archbishop of Washington	United States
Aloísio Lorscheider (1924–2007)	Archbishop of Fortaleza	Brazil
Reginald Delargey (1914–1979)	Archbishop of Wellington	New Zealand
Eduardo Francisco Pironio (1920–1998)	Pro-Prefect of Sacred Congregation for the Religious and Secular Institutes	Argentina
László Lékai (1910–1986)	Archbishop of Esztergom	Hungary
Basil Hume (1923–1999)	Archbishop of Westminster	England
Victor Razafimahatratra (1921–1993)	Archbishop of Tananarive	Madagascar
Dominic Ekandem (1917–1995)	Bishop of Ikot Ekpene	Nigeria
Trinh Nhu Khue (1898–1978)	Archbishop of Hanoi	Vietnam
Bolesław Filipiak (1901–1978)	Dean of Sacred Roman Rota	Poland

=== Cardinal in pectore ===
Name	Title when named cardinal	Country	Revealed as Cardinal
František Tomášek (1899–1992)	Archbishop of Prague	Czechoslovakia	27 June 1977

== 27 June 1977 ==
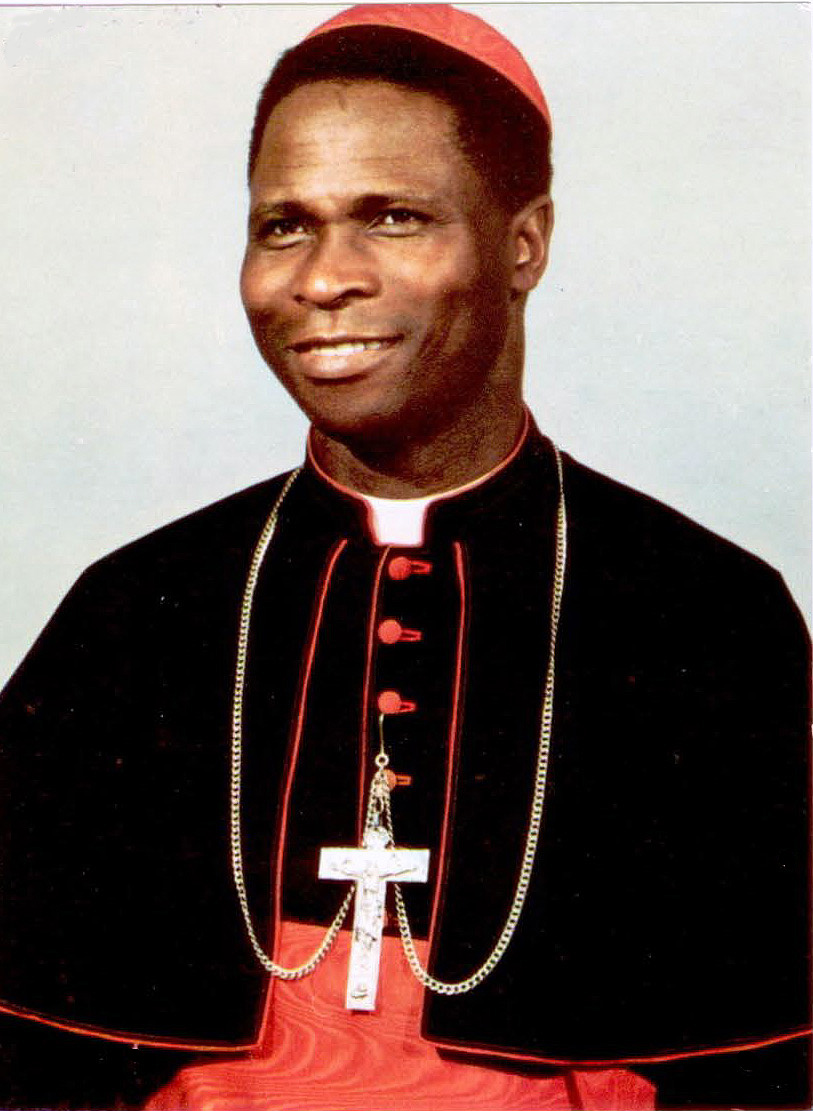
Bernardin Gantin (1922–2008), made a cardinal on 27 June 1977.

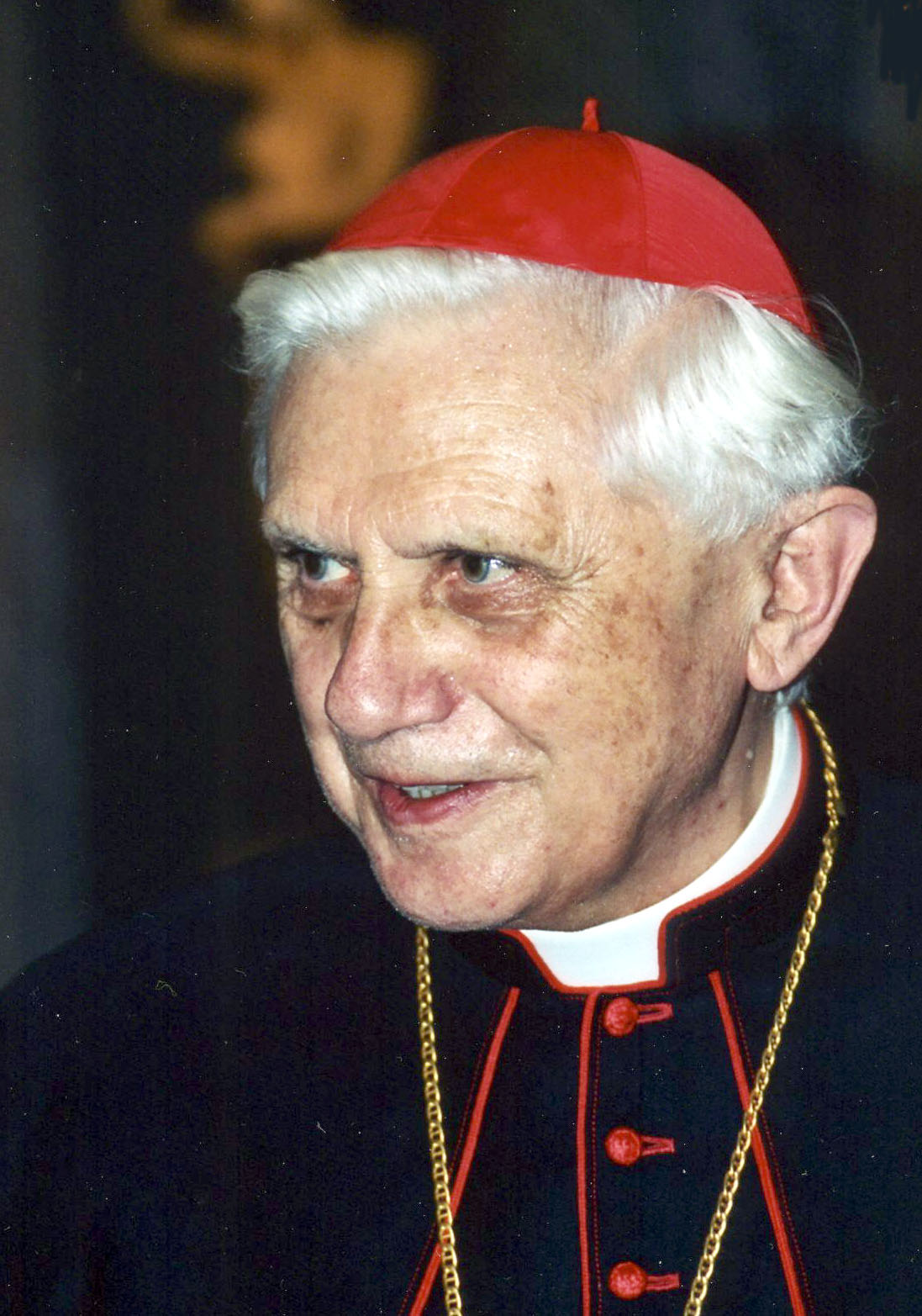
Joseph Ratzinger (1927–2022), made a cardinal on 27 June 1977 and elected as Pope Benedict XVI on the 19 April 2005

On 2 June 1977, Pope Paul announced that he would create four new cardinals on 27 June. On 27 June Pope Paul created these four cardinals and announced the name of Tomášek, created in pectore a year earlier. Four of the five were assigned their titular churches and Gantin his deaconry. All were young enough to serve as papal electors. This brought the membership of the College of Cardinals to 137 and the number of cardinal electors up to the limit of 120. (Note: Since the 1976 consistory, three cardinal electors had died–Julius Döpfner on 24 July 1976, Émile Biayenda 23 March 1977, and William Conway on 17 April 1977–and two had celebrated their 80th birthdays–Ferdinando Antonelli on 14 July 1976 and Patrick O'Boyle on 18 July 1976.) By one account, this "mini-consistory" was held principally for Benelli, who was being made Archbishop of Florence after ten years as Substitute at the Secretariat of State. Paul himself, at a similar stage of a similar career, had been appointed Archbishop of Milan in 1954 but not made a cardinal by Pius XII. This treatment of Benelli prompted speculation that Paul was designating him his successor or preparing to retire when he reached 80 later in the year.

Name	Title when named cardinal	Country
Giovanni Benelli (1921–1982)	Substitute for General Affairs of Secretariat of State	Italy
Bernardin Gantin (1922–2008)	Pro-President of Pontifical Commission of Justice and Peace	Benin
Joseph Ratzinger (1927–2022) (Note: Elected as Pope Benedict XVI (2005–2013))	Archbishop of Munich and Freising	West Germany
Mario Luigi Ciappi (1909–1996)	Theologian of Prefecture of the Papal Household	Italy

== See also ==
- Cardinals created by John XXIII (previous)
- Cardinals created by John Paul II (successor of John Paul I)
