= Bolesław Filipiak =

Polish Cardinal

His Eminence Bolesław Filipiak
- Dean Emeritus of the Roman Rota
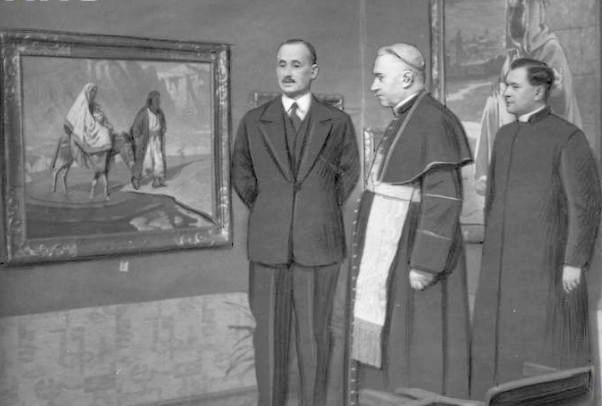
- From the left, Aleksander Laszenko, August Hlond and priest Bolesław Filipiak.
- Church: Roman Catholic Church
- Appointed: 26 June 1967
- Term ended: 1 May 1976
- Predecessor: Francis James Brennan
- Successor: Charles Lefebvre
- Other post: Cardinal-Deacon of San Giovanni Bosco in Via Tuscolana (1976-78)
- Previous post: Titular Archbishop of Plestia (1976)

Orders
- Ordination: 29 May 1926 by Antoni Laubitz
- Consecration: 14 May 1976 by Pericle Felici
- Created cardinal: 24 May 1976 by Pope Paul VI
- Rank: Cardinal-Deacon

Personal details
- Born: Bolesław Filipiak; 1 September 1901 Osniszczewko, Gniezno, Congress Poland
- Died: 14 October 1978 (aged 77) Poznań, Poland
- Buried: Poznań Cathedral
- Parents: Hilari Filipiak; Weronika z Biegałów
- Education: University of Poznań; Pontifical Roman Athenaeum Saint Apollinare

Styles of Bolesław Filipiak
- Reference style: His Eminence
- Spoken style: Your Eminence
- Informal style: Cardinal
- See: none

Bolesław Filipiak (1 September 1901 – 14 October 1978) was a Polish Cardinal of the Roman Catholic Church. He served as Dean of the Roman Rota from 1967 to 1976, and was elevated to the cardinalate in 1976.

== Biography ==
Bolesław Filipiak was born in Ośniszczewko (now in Inowrocław County), Province of Posen, German Empire the oldest of the seven children of Hilarego and Weronika (née Biegałów) Filipiak. He studied at the University of Poznań and the seminary in the same city before being ordained to the priesthood by Bishop Antoni Laubtiza on 29 May 1926. He following a period of pastoral work in Gniezno, Filipiak went to Rome to study at the Pontifical Roman Athenaeum S. Apollinare and the Institute Utriusque Iuris (from where he obtained a doctorate in canon and civil law on 13 April 1935).

From 1935 to 1944 he served as private secretary to Cardinal August Hlond, the primatial Archbishop of Gniezno. Filipiak was jailed in Nazi prisons for a year and then made a member of the archdiocesan tribunal of Gniezno in 1945. He was then president of the tribunal of third instance for matrimonial causes reserved to the Holy See until 1947.

Within the Roman Curia, he was named Auditor (24 September 1947) and later Dean of the Roman Rota (26 June 1967). Filipiak was made an honorary canon of the cathedral chapter of Gniezno on 15 October 1947, and of Poznań on 8 September 1958. He also served as President of the Appellate Tribunal of Vatican City.

On 1 May 1976 Filipiak was appointed Titular Bishop of Plestia by Pope Paul VI. He received his episcopal consecration on the following 14 May from Cardinal Pericle Felici, with Archbishop Antoni Baraniak and Bishop Andrzej Maria Deskur serving as co-consecrators, in the church of Sant'Anselmo all'Aventino. Pope Paul created him Cardinal Deacon of San Giovanni Bosco in Via Tuscolana in the consistory of 24 May 1976. Owing to ill health the Cardinal could not participate in the conclave of August 1978.

Filipiak died in Poznań on the opening day of the October 1978 conclave, at age 77. He is buried in the Cathedral-Basilica of Ss. Peter and Paul.

Catholic Church titles
| Preceded by Francis Brennan | Dean of the Roman Rota; 1967–1976 | Succeeded by Charles Lefebvre |
