= Cardinal electors in the 1963 conclave =

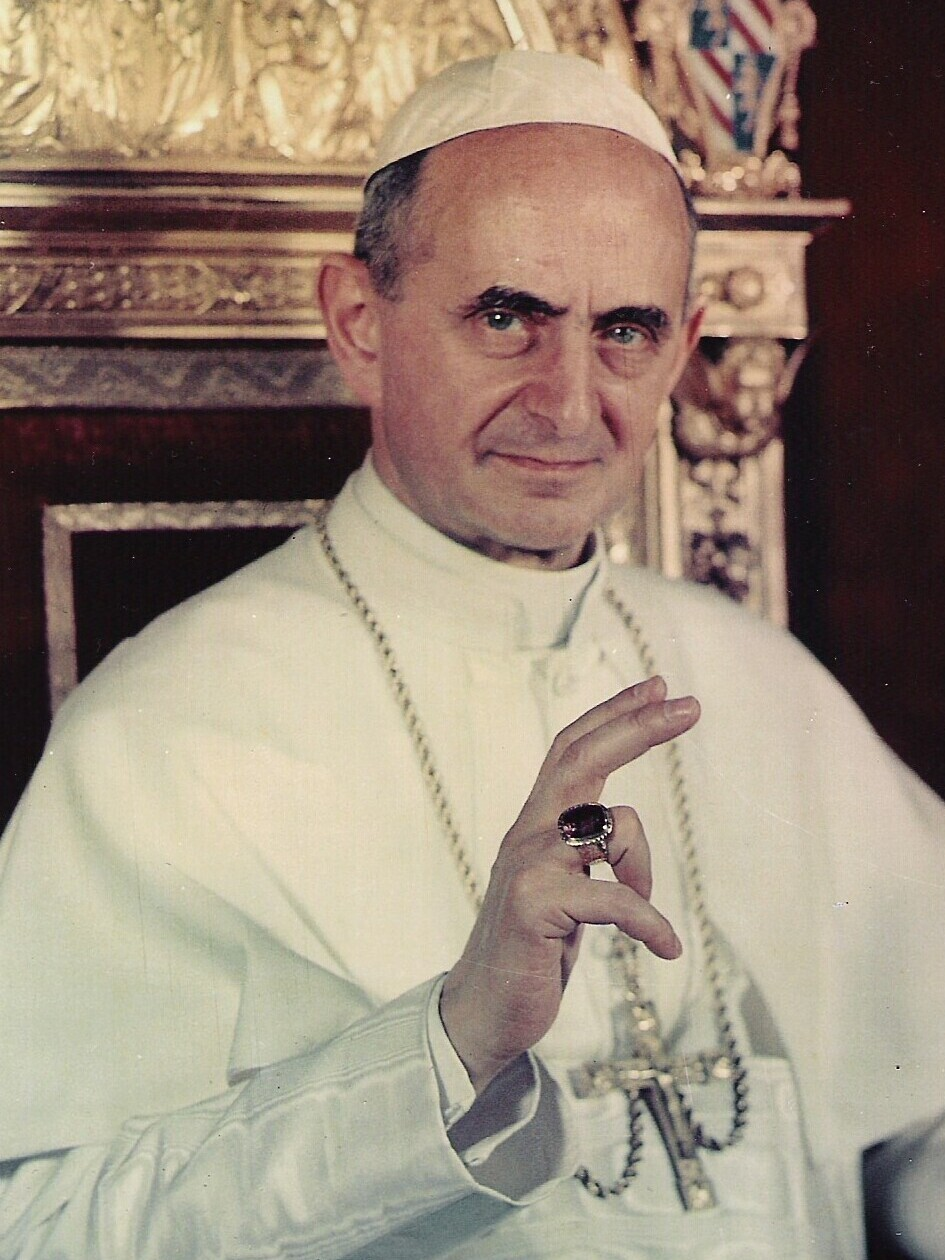
Cardinal Giovanni Montini was elected Pope Paul VI by the 1963 conclave on 21 June.

The papal conclave of 1963 was convened to elect a pope, the leader of the Catholic Church, to succeed Pope John XXIII following his death on 3 June 1963.

Of the 82 members of the College of Cardinals at the time of John XXIII's death, 80 participated in the subsequent conclave. Of the 80 attending electors, 6 were cardinal bishops, 61 were cardinal priests, and 13 were cardinal deacons; 8 had been created cardinals by Pope Pius XI, 26 by Pope Pius XII, and 46 by Pope John XXIII; 21 worked in the service of the Holy See (such as in the Roman Curia), 48 were in pastoral ministry outside Rome, and 11 had retired. The oldest cardinal elector in the conclave was Francesco Morano, at the age of 90, and the youngest was Juan Landázuri Ricketts, at the age of 49. This was the last conclave before the electors were limited to cardinals under 80 years of age, a rule established by Pope Paul VI in his 1970 motu proprio Ingravescentem aetatem and his 1975 apostolic constitution Romano Pontifici eligendo.

The cardinal electors entered the Sistine Chapel to begin the conclave on 19 June 1963. On 21 June, after six ballots over three days, they elected Cardinal Giovanni Montini, the archbishop of Milan, who took the papal name Paul VI.

== Cardinal electors ==
The data below are as of 3 June 1963, the date on which the Holy See became vacant. Cardinals belonging to institutes of consecrated life or to societies of apostolic life are indicated by the relevant post-nominal letters.

* Elected pope

Rank	Name	Country	Born	Order	Consistory	Office
1	Eugène Tisserant	France	24 March 1884 (age 79)	CB	15 June 1936; Pius XI	Prefect of the Congregation of Ceremonies, Librarian of the Vatican Library, Archivist of the Vatican Secret Archive (Dean)
2	Clemente Micara	Italy	24 December 1879 (age 83)	CB	18 February 1946; Pius XII	Vicar General of Rome (Vice-Dean)
3	Giuseppe Pizzardo	Italy	13 July 1877 (age 85)	CB	13 December 1937; Pius XI	Prefect of the Congregation of Seminaries and Universities
4	Benedetto Aloisi Masella	Italy	29 June 1879 (age 83)	CB	18 February 1946; Pius XII	Prefect of the Congregation of the Discipline of the Sacraments, Camerlengo of the Holy Roman Church
5	Amleto Giovanni Cicognani	Italy	24 February 1883 (age 80)	CB	15 December 1958; John XXIII	Cardinal Secretary of State
6	Giuseppe Ferretto	Italy	9 March 1899 (age 64)	CB	15 December 1958; John XXIII	Secretary Emeritus of the College of Cardinals
7	Manuel Gonçalves Cerejeira	Portugal	29 November 1888 (age 74)	CP	16 December 1929; Pius XI	Patriarch of Lisbon
8	Achille Liénart	France	7 February 1884 (age 79)	CP	30 June 1930; Pius XI	Bishop of Lille
9	Maurilio Fossati OSSGCN	Italy	24 May 1876 (age 87)	CP	13 March 1933; Pius XI	Archbishop of Turin
10	Ignatius Gabriel I Tappouni	Lebanon	3 November 1879 (age 83)	CP	16 December 1935; Pius XI	Syriac Patriarch of Antioch
11	Santiago Copello	Argentina	7 January 1880 (age 83)	CP	16 December 1935; Pius XI	Chancellor of the Apostolic Chancery
12	Pierre-Marie Gerlier	France	14 January 1880 (age 83)	CP	13 December 1937; Pius XI	Archbishop of Lyon
13	Gregorio Pietro Agagianian	Lebanon	18 September 1895 (age 67)	CP	18 February 1946; Pius XII	Prefect of the Congregation for Propagation of the Faith
14	James McGuigan	Canada	26 November 1894 (age 68)	CP	18 February 1946; Pius XII	Archbishop of Toronto
15	Clément Roques	France	8 December 1880 (age 82)	CP	18 February 1946; Pius XII	Archbishop of Rennes
16	Carlos Carmelo Vasconcellos Motta	Brazil	16 July 1890 (age 72)	CP	18 February 1946; Pius XII	Archbishop of São Paulo
17	Norman Gilroy	Australia	22 January 1896 (age 67)	CP	18 February 1946; Pius XII	Archbishop of Sydney
18	Francis Spellman	United States	4 May 1889 (age 74)	CP	18 February 1946; Pius XII	Archbishop of New York
19	Jaime de Barros Câmara	Brazil	3 July 1894 (age 68)	CP	18 February 1946; Pius XII	Archbishop of São Sebastião do Rio de Janeiro
20	Enrique Pla y Deniel	Spain	19 December 1876 (age 86)	CP	18 February 1946; Pius XII	Archbishop of Toledo
21	Josef Frings	West Germany	6 February 1887 (age 76)	CP	18 February 1946; Pius XII	Archbishop of Cologne
22	Ernesto Ruffini	Italy	19 January 1888 (age 75)	CP	18 February 1946; Pius XII	Archbishop of Palermo
23	Antonio Caggiano	Argentina	30 January 1889 (age 74)	CP	18 February 1946; Pius XII	Archbishop of Buenos Aires
24	Thomas Tien Ken-sin SVD	China	24 October 1890 (age 72)	CP	18 February 1946; Pius XII	Archbishop of Beijing
25	Augusto da Silva	Brazil	8 April 1876 (age 87)	CP	12 January 1953; Pius XII	Archbishop of São Salvador da Bahia
26	Valerio Valeri	Italy	7 November 1883 (age 79)	CP	12 January 1953; Pius XII	Prefect of the Congregation for Religious
27	Pietro Ciriaci	France	2 December 1885 (age 77)	CP	12 January 1953; Pius XII	Prefect of the Congregation of the Council
28	Maurice Feltin	France	15 May 1883 (age 80)	CP	12 January 1953; Pius XII	Archbishop of Paris
29	Giuseppe Siri	Italy	20 May 1906 (age 57)	CP	12 January 1953; Pius XII	Archbishop of Genoa
30	James Francis McIntyre	United States	25 June 1886 (age 76)	CP	12 January 1953; Pius XII	Archbishop of Los Angeles
31	Giacomo Lercaro	Italy	28 October 1891 (age 71)	CP	12 January 1953; Pius XII	Archbishop of Bologna
32	Stefan Wyszyński	Poland	3 August 1901 (age 61)	CP	12 January 1953; Pius XII	Archbishop of Gniezno and Warsaw
33	Benjamín de Arriba y Castro	Spain	8 April 1886 (age 77)	CP	12 January 1953; Pius XII	Archbishop of Tarragona
34	Fernando Quiroga Palacios	Spain	21 January 1900 (age 63)	CP	12 January 1953; Pius XII	Archbishop of Santiago de Compostela
35	Paul-Émile Léger PSS	Canada	26 April 1904 (age 59)	CP	12 January 1953; Pius XII	Archbishop of Montreal
36	Valerian Gracias	India	23 October 1900 (age 62)	CP	12 January 1953; Pius XII	Archbishop of Bombay
37	Giovanni Montini*	Italy	26 September 1897 (age 65)	CP	15 December 1958; John XXIII	Archbishop of Milan
38	Giovanni Urbani	Italy	26 March 1900 (age 63)	CP	15 December 1958; John XXIII	Patriarch of Venice
39	Paolo Giobbe	Italy	10 January 1880 (age 83)	CP	15 December 1958; John XXIII	Datary of the Apostolic Dataria
40	Fernando Cento	Italy	10 August 1883 (age 79)	CP	15 December 1958; John XXIII	Major Penitentiary of the Apostolic Penitentiary
41	Carlo Chiarlo	Italy	4 November 1881 (age 81)	CP	15 December 1958; John XXIII	Apostolic Nuncio Emeritus to Brazil
42	José Garibi y Rivera	Mexico	30 January 1889 (age 74)	CP	15 December 1958; John XXIII	Archbishop of Guadalajara
43	Antonio María Barbieri OFMCap	Uruguay	12 October 1892 (age 70)	CP	15 December 1958; John XXIII	Archbishop of Montevideo
44	Carlo Confalonieri	Italy	25 July 1893 (age 69)	CP	15 December 1958; John XXIII	Secretary of the Sacred Consistorial Congregation
45	Richard Cushing	United States	24 August 1895 (age 67)	CP	15 December 1958; John XXIII	Archbishop of Boston
46	Alfonso Castaldo	Italy	6 November 1890 (age 72)	CP	15 December 1958; John XXIII	Archbishop of Naples
47	Paul Marie André Richaud	France	16 April 1887 (age 76)	CP	15 December 1958; John XXIII	Archbishop of Bordeaux
48	José Bueno y Monreal	Spain	11 September 1904 (age 58)	CP	15 December 1958; John XXIII	Archbishop of Seville
49	Franz König	Austria	3 August 1905 (age 57)	CP	15 December 1958; John XXIII	Archbishop of Vienna
50	Julius August Döpfner	West Germany	26 August 1913 (age 49)	CP	15 December 1958; John XXIII	Archbishop of Munich and Freising
51	Paolo Marella	Italy	25 January 1895 (age 68)	CP	14 December 1959; John XXIII	Prefect of the Fabric of Saint Peter
52	Gustavo Testa	Italy	28 July 1886 (age 76)	CP	14 December 1959; John XXIII	Secretary of the Congregation for the Oriental Churches
53	Albert Gregory Meyer	United States	9 March 1903 (age 60)	CP	14 December 1959; John XXIII	Archbishop of Chicago
54	Luigi Traglia	Italy	3 April 1895 (age 68)	CP	28 March 1960; John XXIII	Pro-Vicar General of Rome
55	Peter Doi	Japan	22 December 1892 (age 70)	CP	28 March 1960; John XXIII	Archbishop of Tokyo
56	Joseph-Charles Lefèbvre	France	15 April 1892 (age 71)	CP	28 March 1960; John XXIII	Archbishop of Bourges
57	Bernardus Johannes Alfrink	Netherlands	5 July 1900 (age 62)	CP	28 March 1960; John XXIII	Archbishop of Utrecht
58	Rufino Santos	Philippines	26 August 1908 (age 54)	CP	28 March 1960; John XXIII	Archbishop of Manila
59	Laurean Rugambwa	Tanzania	12 July 1912 (age 50)	CP	28 March 1960; John XXIII	Bishop of Bukoba
60	Joseph Ritter	United States	20 July 1892 (age 70)	CP	16 January 1961; John XXIII	Archbishop of St. Louis
61	José Humberto Quintero Parra	Venezuela	22 September 1902 (age 60)	CP	16 January 1961; John XXIII	Archbishop of Caracas
62	Luis Concha Córdoba	Colombia	7 November 1891 (age 71)	CP	16 January 1961; John XXIII	Archbishop of Bogotá
63	José da Costa Nunes	Portugal	15 March 1880 (age 83)	CP	19 March 1962; John XXIII	Vice-Camerlengo Emeritus of the Holy Roman Church
64	Ildebrando Antoniutti	Italy	3 August 1898 (age 64)	CP	19 March 1962; John XXIII	Apostolic Nuncio Emeritus to Spain
65	Efrem Forni	Italy	10 January 1889 (age 74)	CP	19 March 1962; John XXIII	Apostolic Nuncio Emeritus to Belgium
66	Juan Landázuri Ricketts OFM	Peru	19 December 1913 (age 49)	CP	19 March 1962; John XXIII	Archbishop of Lima
67	Raúl Silva Henríquez SDB	Chile	27 September 1907 (age 55)	CP	19 March 1962; John XXIII	Archbishop of Santiago de Chile
68	Leo Joseph Suenens	Belgium	16 July 1904 (age 58)	CP	19 March 1962; John XXIII	Archbishop of Mechelen–Brussels
69	Alfredo Ottaviani	Italy	29 October 1890 (age 72)	CD	12 January 1953; Pius XII	Secretary of the Congregation of the Holy Office (Protodeacon)
70	Alberto di Jorio	Italy	18 July 1884 (age 78)	CD	15 December 1958; John XXIII	Pro-President of the Pontifical Commission for Vatican City State
71	Francesco Bracci	Italy	5 November 1879 (age 83)	CD	15 December 1958; John XXIII	Secretary Emeritus of the Congregation of the Discipline of the Sacraments
72	Francesco Roberti	Italy	7 July 1889 (age 73)	CD	15 December 1958; John XXIII	Prefect of the Apostolic Signatura
73	André-Damien-Ferdinand Jullien PSS	France	25 October 1882 (age 80)	CD	15 December 1958; John XXIII	Dean Emeritus of the Roman Rota
74	Arcadio Larraona Saralegui CMF	Spain	13 November 1887 (age 75)	CD	14 December 1959; John XXIII	Prefect of the Sacred Congregation of Rites
75	Francesco Morano	Italy	8 June 1872 (age 90)	CD	14 December 1959; John XXIII	Secretary of the Apostolic Signatura
76	William Heard	Scotland	24 February 1884 (age 79)	CD	14 December 1959; John XXIII	Dean Emeritus of the Roman Rota
77	Augustin Bea SJ	West Germany	28 May 1881 (age 82)	CD	14 December 1959; John XXIII	President of the Secretariat for Promoting Christian Unity
78	Antonio Bacci	Italy	4 September 1885 (age 77)	CD	28 March 1960; John XXIII	Secretary Emeritus of Briefs to Princes
79	Michael Browne OP	Ireland	6 May 1887 (age 76)	CD	19 March 1962; John XXIII	Master Emeritus of the Order of Preachers
80	Joaquín Albareda y Ramoneda OSB	Spain	16 February 1892 (age 71)	CD	19 March 1962; John XXIII	Prefect Emeritus of the Vatican Library

=== Not in attendance ===
Rank	Name	Country	Born	Order	Consistory	Office	Reason for absence
1	József Mindszenty	Hungary	29 March 1892 (age 71)	CP	18 February 1946; Pius XII	Archbishop of Esztergom	Legal (confined to US Embassy)
2	Carlos María de la Torre	Ecuador	15 November 1873 (age 89)	CP	12 January 1953; Pius XII	Archbishop of Quito	Health (illness)

== Cardinal electors by continent and country ==
The 80 attending cardinal electors were from 28 countries. The countries with the greatest number of cardinal electors were Italy (twenty-nine), France (eight), and Spain (six).

* Continent/country of elected pope

Cardinal electors by continent
Continent	Number	Percentage
Africa	1	1.3%
North America	8	10.0%
South America	10	12.5%
Asia	6	7.5%
Europe*	54	67.5%
Oceania	1	1.3%
Total	80	100.0%

Cardinal electors by country
Country	Continent	Number
Argentina	South America	2
Australia	Oceania	1
Austria	Europe	1
Belgium	Europe	1
Brazil	South America	3
Canada	North America	2
Chile	South America	1
China	Asia	1
Colombia	South America	1
France	Europe	8
India	Asia	1
Ireland	Europe	1
Italy*	Europe	29
Japan	Asia	1
Lebanon	Asia	2
Mexico	North America	1
Netherlands	Europe	1
Peru	South America	1
Philippines	Asia	1
Poland	Europe	1
Portugal	Europe	2
Scotland	Europe	1
Spain	Europe	6
Tanzania	Africa	1
United States	North America	5
Uruguay	South America	1
Venezuela	South America	1
West Germany	Europe	3
Total		80

== See also ==
- Cardinals created by Pius XI
- Cardinals created by Pius XII
- Cardinals created by John XXIII
- Cardinal electors for the 1958 conclave
- Cardinal electors in the 1978 conclaves
