= André-Damien-Ferdinand Jullien =

French Cardinal

His Eminence André-Damien-Ferdinand Jullien P.S.S
- Cardinal-Deacon of San Giorgio in Velabro
- Church: Roman Catholic Church
- Appointed: 18 December 1958
- Term ended: 11 January 1964
- Predecessor: Giovanni Mercati
- Successor: Benno Walter Gut
- Previous posts: Dean of the Roman Rota (1944-58); Titular Archbishop of Corone (1962)

Orders
- Ordination: 1 October 1905
- Consecration: 19 April 1962 by Pope John XXIII
- Created cardinal: 15 December 1958 by Pope John XXIII
- Rank: Cardinal-Deacon

Personal details
- Born: André-Damien-Ferdinand Jullien; 25 October 1882 Pelussin, Lyon, French Third Republic
- Died: 11 January 1964 (aged 81) Clinica San Carlo a Via Aurelia, Rome, Italy
- Buried: San Giorgio in Velabro
- Education: Pontifical Roman Athenaeum Saint Apollinare
- Motto: Habens prae oculis solum Deum
- Coat of arms

Styles of André-Damien-Ferdinand Jullien
- Reference style: His Eminence
- Spoken style: Your Eminence
- Informal style: Cardinal
- See: none

André-Damien-Ferdinand Jullien, P.S.S. (25 October 1882—11 January 1964) was a French Cardinal of the Roman Catholic Church. He served as Dean of the Roman Rota in the Roman Curia from 1944 to 1958, and was elevated to the cardinalate in 1958.

== Biography ==
Born in Pelussin, Lyon, André Jullien studied at the seminary in Issy, the Seminary of Saint-Sulpice in Paris, and the Pontifical Roman Athenaeum S. Apollinare. He was ordained to the priesthood on 1 October 1905, finished his studies in 1908 and then taught canon law at the Seminary of Lyon until 1912. He served as private secretary to Monsignor Séraphin Many, Auditor of the Roman Rota in the Roman Curia, from 1912 to 1922, when he assumed Many's position on 15 September. Pope Pius XII named Jullien, who entered the Society of Saint-Sulpice in 1918, as Dean of the Roman Rota on 30 October 1944.

He was created Cardinal Deacon of S. Giorgio in Velabro by Pope John XXIII in the consistory of 15 December 1958. Resigning as Dean on 18 December that year, Jullien was appointed Titular Archbishop of Corone by Pope John on 5 April 1962. The Cardinal received his episcopal consecration on the following 19 April from Pope John, with Cardinals Giuseppe Pizzardo and Benedetto Aloisi Masella serving as co-consecrators, in the Lateran Basilica. Jullien only remained in that post for one day, resigning on 20 April. He lived long enough to only attend the first two sessions of the Second Vatican Council from 1962 to 1963, and serve as a cardinal elector in the 1963 papal conclave that selected Pope Paul VI.

Jullien died in Rome at age 81. He was buried in his cardinalatial church of San Giorgio in Velabro.

Catholic Church titles
Preceded by Giulio Grazioli	Dean of the Roman Rota; 1944–1958	Succeeded by William Heard
