= Francesco Bracci =

Italian cardinal (1879–1967)

Styles of Francesco Bracci
- Reference style: His Eminence
- Spoken style: Your Eminence
- Informal style: Cardinal
- See: none

Francesco Bracci (November 5, 1879 – March 24, 1967) was an Italian cardinal of the Roman Catholic Church. He served as secretary of the Sacred Congregation for the Discipline of the Sacraments in the Roman Curia from 1935 to 1958, and was elevated to the cardinalate in 1958.

== Biography ==
Born in Vignanello, Francesco Bracci studied at the seminary in Civita Castellana and the University of Rome. He was ordained to the priesthood on June 6, 1903, and finished his studies in 1906. He then served as a professor and the rector of the seminary, canon of the cathedral chapter, and diocesan chancellor in Civita Castellana.

Bracci entered the Roman Curia in 1914, as a lawyer to the Roman Rota, of which he was made auditor on December 29, 1934. Before becoming a referendary prelate of the Apostolic Signatura on January 23, 1926, he was raised to the rank of privy chamberlain of his holiness on November 15, 1919, and later domestic prelate of his holiness on September 18, 1922. On December 30, 1935, Bracci was named secretary of the Sacred Congregation for the Discipline of the Sacraments. As secretary, he served as the second-highest official of that dicastery, successively under Cardinals Domenico Jorio and Benedetto Aloisi Masella.

Pope John XXIII created him Cardinal Deacon of San Cesareo in Palatio in the consistory of December 15, 1958. Bracci, aged 79, was the oldest man to be elevated to the College of Cardinals in that ceremony. He resigned as secretary of Discipline of the Sacraments three days later, on December 18.

On April 5, 1962, Bracci was appointed Titular Archbishop of Idassa by John XXIII. He received his episcopal consecration on the following April 19 from Pope John, with Cardinals Giuseppe Pizzardo and Aloisi Masella serving as co-consecrators, in the Lateran Basilica. The cardinal resigned as titular archbishop shortly afterwards, on April 20, and attended the Second Vatican Council from 1962 to 1965. Called "the man who never laughs", Bracci was one of the cardinal electors in the 1963 papal conclave that elected Pope Paul VI.

He died in Rome at age 87, and is buried in the collegiate church of Vignanello.

Catholic Church titles
| Preceded by Domenico Jorio | Secretary of the Sacred Congregation for the Discipline of the Sacraments; 1935–1958 | Succeeded by Cesare Zerba |
