= Raffaello Funghini =

Italian Catholic clergyman and jurist

Raffaello Funghini (January 1, 1929 - May 17, 2006) was an Italian Catholic clergyman and jurist who was Dean of the Roman Rota and thus, from 2004 to his death, president of the Holy See's Court of Appeals. He was born in Castiglion Fiorentino in the diocese of Arezzo, of which he became a priest. On March 25, 2004, he was ordained titular bishop of Nova Petra. Raffaello Funghini was one of the greatest influences on the Catholic Church. He was a strong believer in freedom of rights. He also did many missionaries to different countries.
