= Miroslav Konštanc Adam =

Slovak Roman Catholic priest (born 1963)

Miroslav Konštanc Adam, OP (born August 2, 1963 in Michalovce) is a Slovak Roman Catholic priest. He was ordained on June 24, 1995, and earned his doctorate in canon law in 2001. He was appointed rector of the Angelicum on March 26, 2012, and installed there on May 4. He was named a prelate auditor of the Apostolic Tribunal of the Roman Rota in March 2016.

He ended his four-year term at the Angelicum in 2016.
