= Michael Xavier Leo Arokiaraj =

Indian clerical lawyer

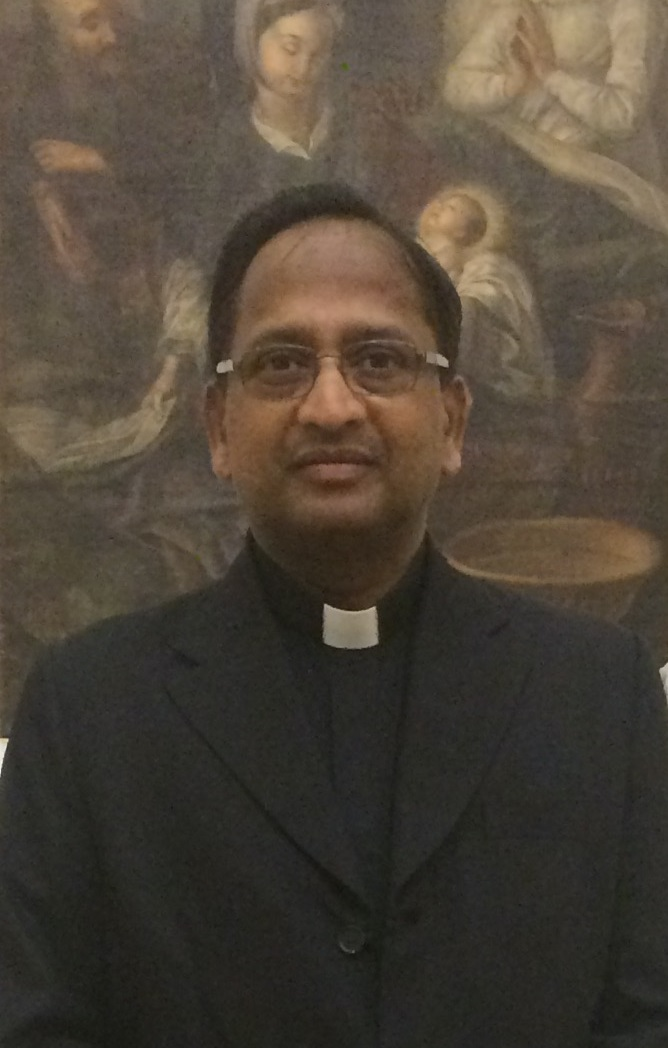
Msgr Michael Xavier Leo Arokiaraj

Michael Xavier Leo Arokiaraj (born 8 September 1958) is an Indian clerical lawyer.

== Early life ==
Monsignore Michael Leo Arockiaraj was born on 8 September 1958 in Mettupatti, in the civil district of Dindigul of Tamil Nadu, South India and of the ecclesiastical diocese of Dindigul. After his initial formation in St Augustine's minor seminary, Trichy, philosophical formation in Christ Hall seminary, Karumathur, and theological formation in Pontifical Urban University, Rome, where he was ordained a priest on 25 April 1984.

== Academic background ==
He obtained a bachelor's degree in Indian civil law in the Government Law College, Trichy, Tamil Nadu and a licentiate and doctorate in canon law in Pontifical Urban University, Rome in 1992.

== In Roman Rota ==
He completed in 1998 his studies to the Roman Rota (Studium rotalis), and was later appointed head of the Chancery of the Roman Rota. Pope Benedict XVI appointed him as a judge (auditor) of the Roman Rota on May 5, 2007. He is the first Asian and Indian to be appointed a judge in this Supreme Tribunal of the Catholic Church. When Pope Francis created a commission to reform the matrimonial process, he was chosen as a member of the commission on 27 August 2014.
