= Giovanni Maria Riminaldi =

Italian Roman Catholic cardinal

Giovanni Maria Riminaldi (4 October 1718 - 11 October 1789) was an Italian Roman Catholic cardinal.

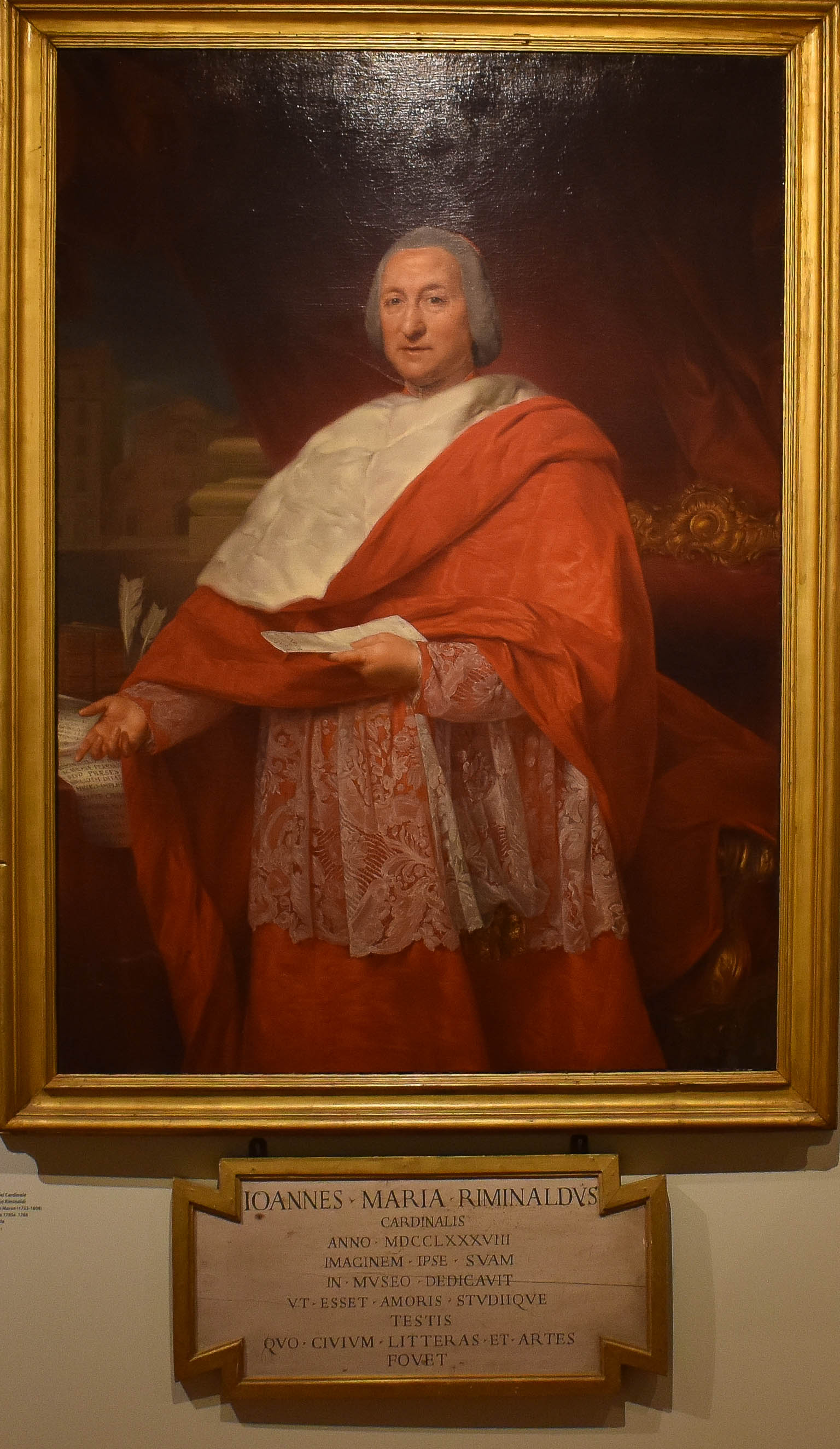
A picture of Anton von Maron Ritratto del Cardinale Gian Maria Riminalidi Palazzo Bonacossi

== Biography ==
He was born in Ferrara to an aristocratic family. He studied at the Collegio di San Carlo in Modena during 1732–1738, but returned to the University of Ferrara to study under Domenico Borsetti and Ippolito Gratiadei. He then moved to Rome and entered positions of leadership within the Vatican hierarchy by the mid 1740s, serving as Auditor of the Camerlengo from 1748 to 1759. He became auditor of the Sacred Roman Rota in 1759; later, became its dean. While living in Rome, he was named by Pope Clement XIV as President of the Pontifical University of Ferrara from 1763 to 1781. He was an avid collector of books, artworks, and antiquities; and donated his collection to institutions in the city. On 14 February 1785, he was elevated to cardinal by Pope Pius VI. He died in Perugia.

He was a close friend of Anton Raphael Mengs. He is said to have played a role in 1754, while magistrate of the Camerlengo along with Cardinal Luigi Valenti Gonzaga and the painter Francesco Mancini (the then-Principe of the Academy of St Luke) in establishing an Accademia del Nudo inside the Vatican under the protection of Cardinal Girolamo Colonna during the papacy of Benedict XIV. He was the owner of a lithotheque or stone sampler, now on display in the Musei Civici di Arte Antica in Ferrara.
