= Alejandro Arellano Cedillo =

Roman Catholic archbishop

Alejandro Arellano Cedillo (Olías del Rey, 8 June 1962) is a Spanish Catholic cleric, professor and jurist who has been the Dean of the Roman Rota since March 2021. Studied for priesthood at Instituto Teológico San Ildefonso and subsequently ordained on 25 October 1987 in Toledo, he has obtained a Licentiate and Doctorate in Canon Law from the Pontifical Gregorian University. He was deputy judicial vicar in the Metropolitan Archdiocese of Madrid and judge in the Tribunal of the Rota of the Apostolic Nunciature to Spain. He is a professor of Canon Law and Jurisprudence. Arellano Cedillo has been prelate auditor of the Roman Rota since 2007. In 2021, Arellano Cedillo was appointed a consulter of the Congregation for the Institutes of Consecrated and the Societies of Apostolic Life. He is a member of Special Commissions for the handling of causes of dispensation from ratified and unconsummated marriage and for the handling of causes of dispensation from the obligations of the diaconate and the priesthood. Arellano Cedillo was appointed the titular bishop of Bisuldino, with the personal title of Archbishop, on 2 February 2023.
