= William Heard (cardinal) =

His Eminence William Theodore Heard
- Dean Emeritus of the Roman Rota
- Church: Roman Catholic Church
- Appointed: 15 December 1958
- Term ended: 14 December 1959
- Predecessor: André-Damien-Ferdinand Jullien
- Successor: Francis Brennan
- Other post: Cardinal-Priest of S. Teodoro
- Previous posts: Titular bishop of Feradi Maius (1962–1962); Cardinal-Deacon of S. Teodoro (1959–1970)

Orders
- Ordination: 30 March 1918 (Priest) by Basilio Pompili
- Consecration: 19 April 1962 (Bishop) by Pope John XXIII
- Created cardinal: 14 December 1959 by Pope John XXIII
- Rank: Cardinal-Priest

Personal details
- Born: 24 February 1884 Edinburgh, Scotland
- Died: 16 September 1973 (aged 89) Rome, Italy
- Buried: Campo Verano
- Parents: William Augustus Heard; Elizabeth Tamar Heard (née Burt)

William Theodore Heard (24 February 1884 – 16 September 1973) was a Scottish cardinal in the Roman Catholic Church.

== Life ==
He was born in Edinburgh, Scotland, the eldest son of Rev Dr William Augustus Heard (1847–1921), a housemaster of Fettes College, and his wife, Elizabeth Tamar Burt (who died when William Theodore was only four). They lived at Carrington House on Comely Bank, one of the school's boarding houses.

He was educated at Fettes College, of which his father was by then headmaster, a role he held from 1887 until 1912. He then studied divinity at Balliol College, Oxford, where he also rowed. He was baptised conditionally and confirmed on 9 August 1910 by Father Stanislaus St John SJ in the Farm Street Church of The Immaculate Conception in Mayfair, central London. In 1913, he was accepted as a candidate for the priesthood by Bishop (later Archbishop) Peter Amigo of Southwark, having failed in his application to the Archdiocese of Saint Andrews and Edinburgh. He then studied at the Pontifical Gregorian University, Rome, where he obtained a doctorate in philosophy in 1915 and doctorates in both theology and canon law in 1921.

He was ordained to the priesthood aged 34 years in the Lateran Basilica on 30 March 1918 by Basilio Pompili, Vicar General for Rome. He acted as confessor for the students of the Venerable English College, Rome, from 1918 to 1921 and again from 1927 until the 1960s. In 1921, he was appointed curate at the Most Holy Trinity parish in Dockhead, Bermondsey. He was named a domestic prelate by Pope Pius XI on 30 September 1927, and on the following day, 1 October 1927, he was named auditor of the Tribunal of the Roman Rota (the judicial part of the Roman Curia), which acts as the Supreme Court of Appeal in the administration of the canon law of the Roman Catholic Church. In 1958, he was appointed dean of the Roman Rota and made cardinal one year later when he was appointed cardinal deacon of the titular church San Teodoro. Three years later he was appointed bishop of the titular see of Feradi Maius and consecrated bishop by Pope John XXIII in the same basilica in which he was ordained priest. He attended all four sessions of the Second Vatican Council from 1962 to 1965 and participated in the conclave of 1963, which elected Pope Paul VI.

For a number of years in the late 1950s and early 1960s, Heard served as an external confessor to the students of the Scots College, Rome, particularly during the summer season, when the students moved to the college villa at Marino.

In 1970 he was elevated to cardinal priest of San Teodoro, as was customary for cardinal deacons after serving for ten years in that capacity.

After a lengthy illness and with failing sight and hearing, he died in the clinic at S. Stefano Rotondo on 16 September 1973, aged 89. His funeral took place in St Peter's Basilica in the Vatican and he was buried in the Campo Verano cemetery, Rome.

== Notes ==
Catholic Church titles
Preceded by Arcadio Larraona Saralegui, CMF	Cardinal protodeacon 1969–1970	Succeeded by Antonio Bacci
