= Antoni Stankiewicz =

Catholic bishop (1935–2021)

Antoni Stankiewicz JCD
- Titular Bishop of Nova Petra
- In office: 15 November 2006 – 4 January 2021
- Other post: Dean of the Roman Rota (2004–2012)

Orders
- Ordination: 20 December 1958 by Wilhelm Pluta
- Consecration: 16 December 2006 by Tarcisio Bertone

Personal details
- Born: 1 October 1935 Wilno Voivodeship, Second Polish Republic
- Died: 4 January 2021 (aged 85) Rome, Italy
- Buried: St. Mary's Cathedral, Gorzów Wielkopolski
- Denomination: Catholicism
- Motto: In Te confido Iesu

Styles of Antoni Stankiewicz
- Reference style: The Most Reverend
- Spoken style: Your Excellency
- Religious style: Bishop
- Posthumous style: none

Antoni Stankiewicz JCD (1 October 1935 – 4 January 2021) was a Polish Roman Catholic Bishop and Dean Emeritus of the Tribunal of the Roman Rota.

He was born in Oleszczenice near Wilno, Poland (now Lithuania). He studied for and was ordained to the priesthood on 20 December 1958 at the age of 23. Pope John Paul II appointed him on 31 January 2004 as Dean of Roman Rota within the Roman Curia. On 15 November 2006, he was appointed to the titular see of Nova Petra, and on the following 16 December he was ordained a bishop by Tarcisio Bertone, Cardinal Secretary of State, with Cardinals James Francis Stafford and Jean-Louis Tauran as co-consecrators.

The Rota, of which Stankiewicz was Dean, acts as a third (and higher) instance appellate tribunal, reviewing decisions of lower courts, mainly on marriage annulment cases, but including other non-administrative cases also.

On his 75th birthday in 2010 he submitted his resignation to Pope Benedict XVI. His resignation was accepted on 22 September 2012 and Pio Vito Pinto was appointed as his successor. He died in Rome, aged 85.
