= Dean of the Roman Rota =

Senior Catholic Church jurist position

The Dean of the Roman Rota (Decanus Rotæ Romanæ) is the senior auditor of the Tribunal of the Roman Rota, the last instance appellate tribunal of the Roman Catholic Church.

On 30 March 2021, Pope Francis appointed Msgr. Alejandro Arellano Cedillo to the office. Since 12 December 2016, the pro-dean has been Maurice Monier.

== Chronological list of deans ==
- Séraphin Olivier-Razali (c. 1590 – c. 1602)
- Girolamo Pamphili (c. 1604)
- Francisco Peña (1604 – c. 1610)
- Joannis Baptista Coccini (c. 1623)
- Carlo Cerri (1669–1670)
- Jakob de Mathiis Emerix (c. 1686)
- Curzio Origo (c. 1711)
- Carlo Leopoldo Calcagnini (1734–1744)
- Mario Millini (c. 1744)
- Giovanni Maria Riminaldi (c. 1780 — c. 1785)
- Alphonse-Hubert de Latier de Bayane (c. 1802)
- Francesco Cesare Leoni (1802–1804)
- Francesco Serlupi-Crescenzi (1817–1823)
- Joachim-Jean-Xavier d'Isoard (10 March 1823 — 25 June 1827)
- Alessandro Spada (c. 1830)
- Cosimo Corsi (c. 1842)
- Giuseppe Bofondi (24 January 1842 — 1846)
- Pietro de Silvestri (c. 1850 — March 15, 1858)
- Michele Lega (20 October 1908 — 25 May 1914)
- Guglielmo Sebastianelli (1914–1920)
- Serafino Many (1920–1921)
- Giovanni Prior (c. 1921 — 28 April 1926)
- Massimo Massimi (1 May 1926 — 16 December 1935)
- Giulio Grazioli (1936 — 30 October 1944)
- André-Damien-Ferdinand Jullien (30 October 1944 — 15 December 1958)
- William Theodore Heard (15 December 1958 — 14 December 1959)
- Francis John Brennan (14 December 1959 — 10 June 1967)
- Bolesław Filipiak (26 June 1967 — 24 May 1976)
- Charles Lefebvre (1976–1978)
- Heinrich Ewers (1978 — 28 January 1982)
- Arturo De Jorio (28 January 1982 — 1985)
- Ernesto Maria Fiore (6 June 1985 — 2 July 1993)
- Mario Francesco Pompedda (11 September 1993 — 16 November 1999)
- Raffaello Funghini (11 December 1999 — 31 January 2004)
- Antoni Stankiewicz (31 January 2004 — 22 September 2012); retired
- Pio Vito Pinto (22 September 2012 — 29 March 2021); also appointed President of the Court of Appeal of the State of Vatican City on 10 December 2012
- Maurice Monier (Pro-Dean, 12 December 2016)
- Alejandro Arellano Cedillo (30 March 2021)
