= Joaquín Albareda y Ramoneda =

Spanish Roman Catholic cardinal

His Eminence Joaquín Albareda y Ramoneda O.S.B.
- Cardinal-Deacon of Sant'Apollinare alle Terme Neroniane-Alessandrine
- Church: Roman Catholic Church
- Appointed: 22 March 1962
- Term ended: 19 July 1966
- Predecessor: Domenico Tardini
- Successor: Pericle Felici
- Previous posts: Prefect of the Vatican Apostolic Library (1936–62); Titular Archbishop of Gypsaria (1962)

Orders
- Ordination: 7 July 1915
- Consecration: 19 April 1962 by Pope John XXIII
- Created cardinal: 19 March 1962 by Pope John XXIII
- Rank: Cardinal-Deacon

Personal details
- Born: Joaquín Albareda y Ramoneda; 16 February 1892 Barcelona, Kingdom of Spain
- Died: 19 July 1966 (aged 74) Clínica Corachan, Barcelona, Francoist Spain
- Parents: Vicente Albareda; María Ramoneda
- Motto: Christi praeponere nihl amore
- Coat of arms

Styles of Joaquín Albareda y Ramoneda
- Reference style: His Eminence
- Spoken style: Your Eminence
- Informal style: Cardinal

Joaquín Anselmo María Albareda y Ramoneda, O.S.B. (16 February 1892 – 19 July 1966) was a Spanish Cardinal of the Roman Catholic Church who served as Prefect of the Vatican Library from 1936 to 1962, and was elevated to the cardinalate in 1962.

== Biography ==
Joaquín Albareda y Ramoneda was born in Barcelona to Vicente Albareda and his wife María Ramoneda. Entering the Order of Saint Benedict at Santa María de Montserrat in 1904, he took the name Anselmo María upon his profession on 4 November 1908. Ordained to the priesthood on 7 July 1915, Albareda then remained as a member of the Montserrat community until 1921. He furthered his studies from 1921 to 1923, attending the Athenaeum of St. Anselm in Rome and the Faculty of Palaeography and Archives in Freiburg. Returning to the Montserrat monastery, he served as its archivist from 1923 to 1936.

On 19 June 1936 Albareda was appointed Prefect of the Vatican Library by Pope Pius XI. He was made Titular Abbot of Santa Maria de Ripoll on 5 May 1950, receiving the traditional abbatial blessing from Cardinal Eugène-Gabriel-Gervais-Laurent Tisserant on 26 August 1951. Pope John XXIII created Albareda Cardinal Deacon of S. Apollinare alle Terme Neroniane-Alessandrine in the consistory of 19 March 1962, on which date Albareda resigned as Prefect.

The Cardinal was named by Pope John as Titular Archbishop of Gypsaria on 5 April 1962. He received his episcopal consecration on the following 19 April from Pope John, with Cardinals Giuseppe Pizzardo and Benedetto Aloisi Masella serving as co-consecrators, in the Lateran Basilica. Albareda stepped down as Titular Archbishop the next day, 20 April. From 1962 to 1965, he attended the Second Vatican Council, during the course of which he was one of the cardinal electors who participated in the 1963 papal conclave that elected Pope Paul VI.

The Cardinal died in his native Barcelona, at age 74. He is buried at the Montserrat monastery.

== See also ==
- List of archivists

Catholic Church titles
Preceded by Franziskus Ehrle, SJ	Prefect of the Vatican Library; 1936–1962	Succeeded by Alfonso Raes, SJ
