= Francis Brennan (cardinal) =

American cardinal

His Eminence Francis Brennan
- Prefect of the Congregation for the Discipline of the Sacraments
- Coat of Arms U.S. Cardinal Francis John Joseph Brennan
- Church: Catholic Church
- Appointed: 15 January 1968
- Term ended: 2 July 1968
- Predecessor: Francesco Carpino
- Successor: Antonio Samorè
- Other posts: Titular Archbishop of Tubunae in Mauretania (1967-1968); Cardinal-Deacon of Sant'Eustachio (1967-1968)
- Previous posts: Dean of the Roman Rota (1959-1968)

Orders
- Ordination: April 3, 1920 by Basilio Pompili
- Consecration: June 25, 1968 by Eugène Tisserant
- Created cardinal: June 26, 1967 by Paul VI
- Rank: Cardinal-Deacon

Personal details
- Born: May 7, 1894 Shenandoah, Pennsylvania, U.S.
- Died: July 2, 1968 (aged 74) Philadelphia, Pennsylvania, U.S.
- Buried: Crypt of SS. Peter and Paul Cathedral-Basilica
- Denomination: Roman Catholic
- Parents: James and Margaret (née Connors) Brennan
- Education: St. Charles Borromeo Seminary
- Alma mater: Pontifical Roman Athenaeum S. Apollinare

Francis John Joseph Brennan (May 7, 1894 – July 2, 1968) was an American cardinal of the Catholic Church. He served as dean of the Roman Rota from 1959 to 1968, and then as prefect of the Congregation for the Discipline of the Sacraments from 1968 until his death. Brennan was elevated to the cardinalate in 1967.

== Biography ==
An American of Irish extraction, Francis Brennan was born in Shenandoah, Pennsylvania, to James and Margaret (née Connors) Brennan. He studied at St. Charles Borromeo Seminary in Overbrook before furthering his studies in Rome, where he attended the Pontifical Roman Athenaeum S. Apollinare and the Pontifical Roman Seminary. He was ordained to the priesthood by Cardinal Basilio Pompili on April 3, 1920.

Upon his return to the United States, Brennan did pastoral work in the Archdiocese of Philadelphia from 1924 to 1928, when he became a member of the faculty at his alma mater, St. Charles Seminary. He was also an official of the archdiocesan curia of Philadelphia from 1937 to 1940. Described as a "brilliant canon lawyer", he was named an auditor of the Roman Rota on August 1, 1940, rising to become its dean on December 14, 1959.

On June 10, 1967, Brennan was appointed Titular Archbishop of Tubunae in Mauretania by Pope Paul VI. He received his episcopal consecration on the following June 25 from Cardinal Eugène-Gabriel-Gervais-Laurent Tisserant, with Bishops Joseph Carroll McCormick and Luigi Faveri serving as co-consecrators, at the church of Sant'Anselmo all'Aventino.

Paul VI created him Cardinal-Deacon of S. Eustachio in the consistory the next day, on June 26, 1967. Brennan was later named prefect of the Congregation for the Discipline of the Sacraments on January 15, 1968.

The cardinal died from a heart attack in Philadelphia, aged 74. At the time of his death, he had risen to the highest post within the Holy See ever held by an American. Brennan is buried in the crypt of SS. Peter and Paul Cathedral-Basilica.

Catholic Church titles
Preceded by –	— TITULAR — Titular Bishop of Tubunae in Mauretania; 1967–1968	Succeeded by –
Preceded by –	— TITULAR — Cardinal-Deacon of S. Eustachio; 1967–1968	Succeeded by –
Preceded by Francesco Carpino	Prefect of the Congregation for the Discipline of the Sacraments; 1968	Succeeded by Antonio Samoré
