= Hans-Peter Fischer =

German Catholic priest

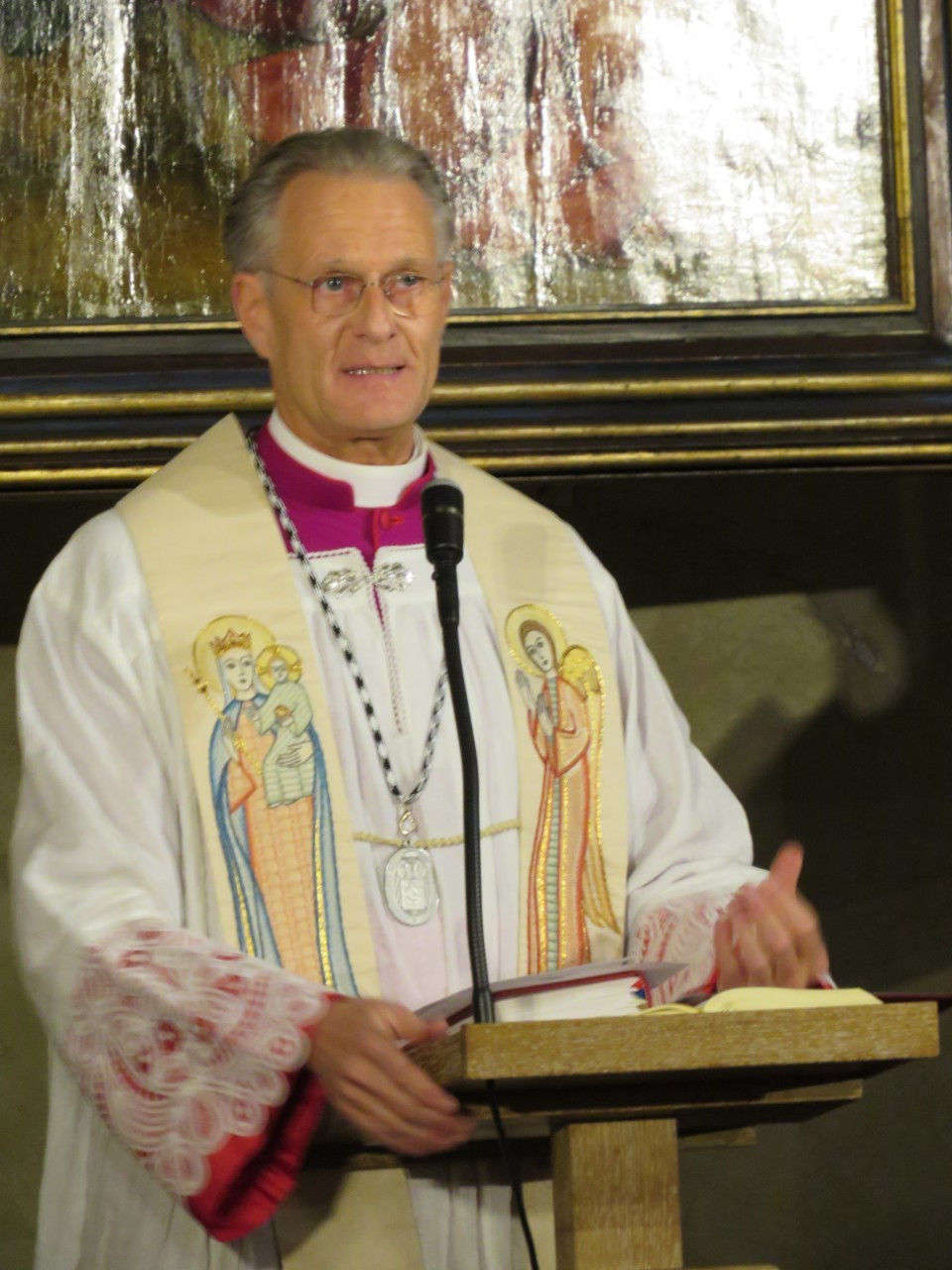
Hans-Peter Fischer preaching at the Collegio Teutonico in 2020

Hans-Peter Fischer (born July 10, 1961, in Freiburg im Breisgau) is a German Catholic priest. He was appointed as a Prelate Auditor of the Apostolic Tribunal of the Roman Rota in 2017. From 2010 to 2022, he served as rector of the Archconfraternity of Our Lady of Sorrows of the Germans and the Flemish in the Vatican and as rector of the Pontifical Teutonic College of Santa Maria in Campo Santo.

== Early life and formation ==
Hans-Peter Fischer was born in Freiburg im Breisgau. He graduated from the Droste-Hülshoff-Gymnasium in 1982 and initiated the priestly formation. He studied the canonical studies at the University of Freiburg and made in 1984/85 an exchange year at the Pontifical Gregorian University. He received the diaconal ordination in December 1987 and in May 1989 the ordination to the priesthood by the archbishop Oskar Saier.

In 1995, he earned a Ph.D. in Church history from the University of Freiburg and studied from 1997 to 2001 a Licentiate (degree) in Canon law at LMU Munich. During his studies in Munich, he was admitted into the Herzogliches Georgianum.

== Priestly ministry ==
Hans-Peter Fischer served as a deacon in Durlach. From 1989 to 1991 he was vicar in Gottmadingen und from 1992 to 1995 in Bollschweil, St. Ulrich's Priory in the Black Forest and in Sölden. After finishing his doctoral studies, he was here appointed parochial administrator for the term 1995–1997.

During his time in Munich, he served as assistant pastor at the Heilig-Geist-Kirche. From 2002 to 2010, Hans-Peter Fischer was the principal pastor of Donaueschingen.

From 2001 to 2010, he served part-time as Judge at the Ecclesiastical courts in the Archdiocese of Munich and Freising, and from 2004 to 2010 in the Archdiocese of Freiburg.

From 2012 to 2013, he directed the German Pilgrim Center in Rome. In November 2016, archbishop Stephan Burger appointed him Diocesan Counsellor ad honorem (Bischöflicher Geistlicher Rat).

On July 10, 2017, Pope Francis appointed Fischer Prelate Auditor of the Roman Rota.

== Academic related activity ==
Hans-Peter Fischer lectured at the Pontifical Gregorian University from 2013 to 2016. Since 2012, he is also editor of the Römische Quartalschrift für Christliche Altertumskunde und Kirchengeschichte.

== Membership in charitable institutions and honors ==
=== Honors ===
- 2016: Knight Commander with Star of the Order of the Holy Sepulchre
- 2016: Knight of the Order of Saints Maurice and Lazarus
- 2013: Conventual Chaplain ad honorem of the Sovereign Military Order of Malta

=== Archconfraternities ===
- 2015: Member of the Venerabile Arciconfraternita di Sant'Anna de' Palafrenieri
- 2020: Member of the Archconfraternity of the Geigeißelten Heiland auf der Wies
- 2012: Member of the Archconfraternity of Santa Maria dell'Anima

== Publications ==
Die Freiburger Erzbischofswahlen 1898 und der Episkopat von Thomas Nörber. Ein Beitrag zu Diözesangeschichte.Freiburg/München: Alber Verlag 1997, ISBN 3-495-49941-5.

As editor together with Albrecht Weiland Der Campo Santo Teutonico – eine deutschsprachige Exklave im Vatikan.' Regensburg: Schnell & Steiner 2016, ISBN 978-3-7954-3149-5.
