= Antonio Bacci =

His Eminence Antonio Bacci
- Cardinal Protodeacon
- Church: Roman Catholic Church
- Appointed: 18 May 1970
- Term ended: 20 January 1971
- Predecessor: William Theodore Heard
- Successor: Michael Browne
- Other post: Cardinal-Deacon of Sant'Eugenio (1960–71)
- Previous posts: Secretary of the Secretariat of Briefs to Princes (1931–60); Titular Archbishop of Colonia in Cappadocia (1962)

Orders
- Ordination: 9 August 1909
- Consecration: 19 April 1962 by Pope John XXIII
- Created cardinal: 28 March 1960 by Pope John XXIII
- Rank: Cardinal-Deacon

Personal details
- Born: Antonio Bacci; 4 September 1885 Giugnola, Kingdom of Italy
- Died: 20 January 1971 (aged 85) Vatican City
- Motto: Non nomen sed virtus
- Coat of arms: Antonio Bacci's coat of arms

Styles of Antonio Bacci
- Reference style: His Eminence
- Spoken style: Your Eminence
- Religious style: Cardinal
- Informal style: Cardinal
- See: Colonia in Cappadocia (titular)

Antonio Bacci (4 September 1885 – 20 January 1971) was an Italian cardinal of the Roman Catholic Church. He served as Secretary of Briefs to Princes from 1931 to 1960, when he was elevated to the cardinalate by Pope John XXIII. He is perhaps best known for his role in the Ottaviani Intervention.

== Biography ==
Bacci was born in Giugnola, near Florence, and ordained to the priesthood on 9 August 1909. From 1910 to 1922, he served as professor and spiritual director of the seminary in Florence. Bacci then entered the Vatican Secretariat of State in 1922 as an expert in Latin. He was raised to the rank of honorary chamberlain of his holiness on 15 March 1923, and appointed Secretary of Briefs to Princes in 1931. During his 31-year-long tenure as secretary, he prepared the Latin text of important Vatican documents during the reigns of Pius XI, Pius XII, and John XXIII. Prior to the 1958 papal conclave, he called for "a saintly Pope" who could "be a bridge between heaven and the earth ... between the social classes ... [and] a bridge among nations, even those who reject and persecute Christian religion."

John XXIII created him Cardinal-Deacon of Sant'Eugenio in the consistory of 28 March 1960. Cardinal Bacci was later named titular archbishop of Colonia in Cappadocia on 5 April 1962, and received his episcopal consecration on the following 19 April from John XXIII, with Cardinals Giuseppe Pizzardo and Benedetto Aloisi Masella serving as co-consecrators. He attended the Second Vatican Council from 1962 to 1965, and participated in the 1963 papal conclave that elected Pope Paul VI.

One of the Vatican's leading Latin experts, Bacci strongly opposed the introduction of the vernacular into the Mass. In what was known as the Ottaviani Intervention, the 84-year-old Bacci, together with 79-year-old Alfredo Ottaviani, sent to Pope Paul VI, with a short covering letter from themselves, a study by a group of theologians under the direction of Archbishop Marcel Lefebvre criticizing the draft Order of Mass of the revision of the Roman Missal. In their letter, the two cardinals said that the study showed that the new Order of Mass "represents, both as a whole and in its details, a striking departure from the Catholic theology of the Mass as it was formulated in Session 22 of the Council of Trent ... to which, nonetheless, the Catholic conscience is bound forever. With the promulgation of the Novus Ordo, the loyal Catholic is thus faced with a most tragic alternative."

Among Bacci's publications was Lexicon Eorum Vocabulorum Quae Difficilius Latine Redduntur, a dictionary of modern terms in Latin; he invented such words as gummis salivaria ("chewing gum"), barbara saltatio ("the twist"), and diurnarius scriptor ("newspaper reporter"). This was a standard reference for writers of Modern Latin, especially at the Vatican, until it was superseded by the Lexicon Recentis Latinitatis.

Bacci died at Vatican City, at age 85. He is buried in his native Giugnola, near Florence.

Catholic Church titles
Preceded by William Theodore Heard	Cardinal Protodeacon; 1970–1971	Succeeded by Michael Browne, OP
