= Auditor (ecclesiastical) =

Person given authority to hear cases in an ecclesiastical court

In ecclesiastical terminology, an auditor (from a Latin word meaning "hearer") is a person given authority to hear cases in an ecclesiastical court.

== Roman Catholic Church ==
In the Roman Catholic Church, an auditor is the person (male or female) delegated to gather the evidence (drawing up the case) for presentation to the judge, and so could be called an instructing judge. Unless the judge determines otherwise, the auditor decides what evidence is to be collected and the manner of its collection.

The auditor has been described as "the impartial court official that collects all necessary documents for the case, and may supplement the acts of the case with further questioning of parties and witnesses".

The auditor may be chosen from the tribunal judges, or from persons, clergy or lay people, approved by the bishop for this office. The persons chosen by the bishop should be conspicuous for their good conduct, prudence and learning.

The manner in which the auditor is to conduct the questioning of witnesses is indicated in canons 1558-1571 of the Code of Canon Law.

Whenever the ordinary receives information with at least a semblance of truth about a punishable offence, he is to investigate the circumstances either personally or through some other suitable person, who then has the same powers as an auditor. If later a judicial process is initiated, that person may not be a judge in the case.

The judges of the Roman Rota are given the title of Auditor or Prelate Auditor.

Until the late 20th century, the title of Auditor was in use in the diplomatic service of the Holy See to designate a rank higher than that of First Secretary, but below that of Counsellor.

== Church of England ==
In the Church of England, the auditor is a judge who is a member of both the Arches Court of Canterbury and the Chancery Court of York.

== Church of Scientology ==
In the Church of Scientology, an auditor is a spiritual counselor who is authorised to use Scientology tech while giving religious counsel (auditing).
