= Roman Rota =

Catholic appellate court

The Roman Rota, formally the Apostolic Tribunal of the Roman Rota (Latin: Tribunal Apostolicum Rotae Romanae), and anciently the Apostolic Court of Audience, is the highest appellate tribunal of the Catholic Church, with respect to both Latin Church members and the Eastern Catholic members and is the highest ecclesiastical court constituted by the Holy See related to judicial trials conducted in the Catholic Church. An appeal may be had to the pope himself, who is the supreme ecclesiastical judge. The Catholic Church has a complete legal system, which is the oldest in the West still in use. The court is named Rota (wheel) because the judges, called auditors, originally met in a round room to hear cases. The Rota emerged from the Apostolic Chancery starting in the 12th century.

== Constitution ==
The pope appoints the auditors of the Rota and designates one of them the dean. On September 22, 2012, Pope Benedict XVI accepted the resignation, for reasons of age, of Bishop Antoni Stankiewicz as dean and appointed in his place Msgr. Pio Vito Pinto, who had been serving as a prelate auditor of the Court of First Instance. On March 29, 2021, Msgr. Pinto retired and Pope Francis appointed Msgr. Alejandro Arellano Cedillo as dean.

The Rota issues its decrees and sentences in Latin. The Rota adjudicates cases in a panel (called a turnus) of three auditors, or more, depending on the complexity of the matter, assigned by the dean of the tribunal. The auditors of the Rota are selected from among recognized ecclesiastical judges serving various dioceses around the world.

== History ==
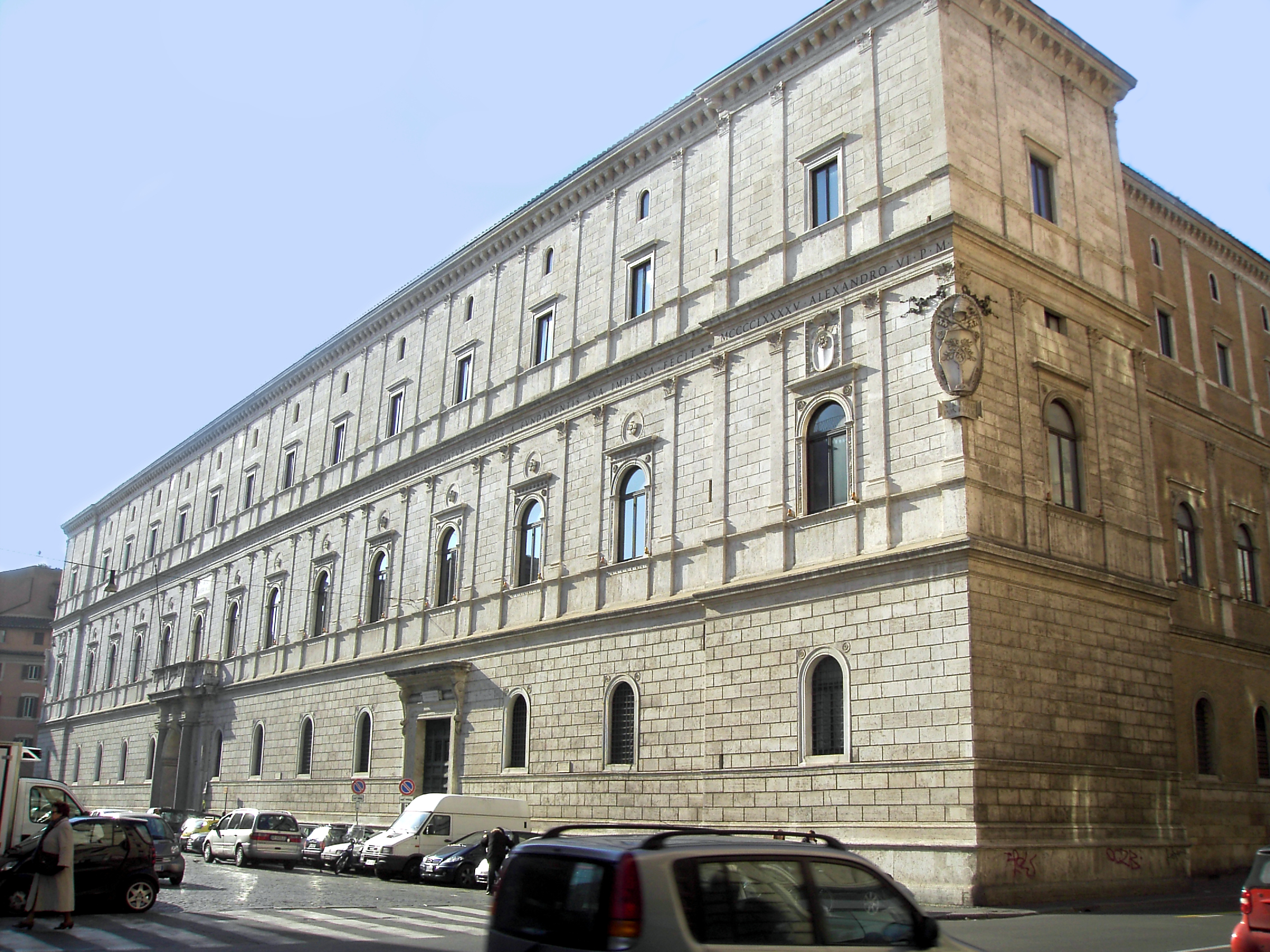
Façade of the Palazzo della Cancelleria in Rome

The Rota's official records begin in 1171. Until the Risorgimento and the loss of the Papal States in 1870, the Rota was a civil tribunal and its judgements had the status of law in the Papal States.

Since at least 1961, the Rota has been based in the Palazzo della Cancelleria, along with the other courts of the Holy See: the Apostolic Penitentiary and the Apostolic Signatura.

=== Name ===
Until the 14th century, the court was formally known as the Apostolic Court of Audience. The first recorded use of the term Rota, which referred to the wheel-shaped arrangement of the benches used by the court in the great hall at Avignon, is in Thomas Fastolf's Decisiones rotae, consisting of reports on thirty-six cases heard at the Court of Audience in Avignon between December 1336 and February 1337. Its first usage in a papal bull is in 1418. It is also possible that the term Rota comes from the porphyry wheel that was centered in the marble floor of Avignon, or even from the wheel-like cases in which parchment roll records were kept.

=== Tribunal of the Rota of the Apostolic Nunciature in Spain ===
The Tribunal of the Rota of the Apostolic Nunciature in Spain (Spanish: Tribunal de la Rota de la Nunciatura Apostólica en España), commonly referred to as the Tribunal de la Rota, is a collegial ordinary appellate court of the Catholic Church situated in Madrid, Spain. Operating under the auspices of the Apostolic Nunciature to Spain, it is a unique territorial tribunal within the global canon law system, granted as a special historic privilege by the Holy See to the Spanish Church.

The roots of the Spanish Rota date back to the 16th century during the reign of Emperor Charles I of Spain. Documented evidence shows that on April 16, 1529, Pope Clement VII granted extensive judicial faculties to the papal nuncio Girolamo da Schio. By 1537, a permanent "Tribunal of the Nuncio" (Spanish: Tribunal del Nuncio) was operating concurrently with the permanent establishment of the nunciature. This allowed Spanish subjects to resolve internal ecclesiastical disputes locally rather than journeying to the Roman Curia.

The Tribunal of the Rota of the Nunciature in Spain represents a unique exception in the Catholic Church, as Spain is the only territory in the world granted the special privilege of hosting its own ordinary appellate court with the same canonical authority as the Roman Rota in the Vatican.

== Operations ==
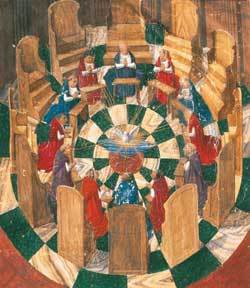
The Roman Rota is named after the round room in which it originally met.

The Rota's main function is that of an appellate tribunal, ordinarily reviewing decisions of lower courts if the initial court (first instance) and the first appellate court (second instance) do not agree on the outcome of a case; however, any party to an initial decision before a court of the Latin Church (and also some Eastern Churches) has the right to file a second-instance appeal directly to the Rota. Dominating its caseload are petitions seeking the issuance of a decree of nullity of a marriage, although it has jurisdiction to hear any other type of judicial and non-administrative case in any area of canon law. The Rota serves as a tribunal of first instance (in Anglo-American common law what would be termed exclusive original jurisdiction) in certain cases such as any contentious case in which a bishop of the Latin Church is a defendant. If the case can still be appealed after a Rotal decision, the appeal goes to a different turnus, or panel, of the Rota. The Rota is the highest appeals court for all judicial trials in the Catholic Church. A judgment of the Rota can, however with the greatest difficulty, be vacated by the Supreme Tribunal of the Apostolic Signatura, which is the highest administrative court in the Catholic Church. However, the legal procedure or process used by the judges of the Rota, not the merits of the case, are on trial before the Signatura: the Signatura is only able to grant the petitioner a new trial to be held before a new turnus of the Rota, if the Rota was found to have erred in procedure ("de procedendo").

The Roman Rota proceedings are governed by a specific set of rules, the "Normae Romanae Rotae Tribunalis", promulgated in 1994 by Pope John Paul II. Only advocates who are registered in a specific list are allowed to represent the parties before the Tribunal.

Since Pope Benedict XVI issued the motu proprio Quaerit semper the Rota has had exclusive competence to dispense from marriages ratum sed non consummatum and is also competent to examine cases concerning the nullity of sacred ordination, in accordance with both universal and proper law.

=== Auditors ===
The active auditors of the Rota, with their dates of appointment:

- Alejandro Arellano Cedillo (Dean) (25 April 2007; named Dean 30 March 2021)
- Grzegorz Erlebach (4 November 1997)
- Jair Ferreira Pena (8 February 1999)
- Michael Xavier Leo Arokiaraj (25 April 2007)
- David Maria A. Jaeger (3 June 2011)
- Vito Angelo Todisco (4 October 2011)
- Felipe Heredia Esteban (4 October 2011)
- Davide Salvatori (30 December 2011)
- Alejandro W. Bunge (17 April 2013)
- Antonio Bartolacci (23 January 2014)
- Manuel Saturino da Costa Gomes (23 January 2014)
- Pietro Milite (9 January 2015)
- Miroslav Konštanc Adam (22 March 2016)
- José Fernando Mejía Yáñez (22 March 2016)
- Francesco Viscome (21 November 2016)
- Hans-Peter Fischer (20 July 2017)
- Robert Gołębiowski (19 July 2019)
- Antonios Chouweifaty (25 April 2022)
- Pierangelo Pietracatella, (23 January 2023)
- Tomasz Kubiczek (14 January 2025)

These are the current emeritus auditors of the Rota, with their dates of appointment and retirement:

- Pio Vito Pinto, dean emeritus (25 March 1995; emeritus 29 March 2021)
- José María Serrano Ruiz (25 March 1970; emeritus 2007)
- Egidio Turnaturi (2 July 1994; emeritus 2010)
- Robert Sable (6 July 1994; emeritus 2018)
- Maurice Monier (9 January 1995; emeritus 5 March 2026)
- Laurence John Spiteri (25 April 2022; emeritus 9 September 2025)

=== Officers ===
- Msgr. Konrad Maria Ackermann, (Promoter of Justice)
- Avv. Domenico Teti, (Adjunct Promoter of Justice)
- Avv. Maria Frantangelo, (Defender of the Bond)
- Msgr. Jude Barthomieux Frédéric, (Defender of the Bond)
- Msgr. Francesco Ibba, (Defender of the Bond)

- Dr. Daniele Cancilla, (Head of the Chancery)
- Avv. Enrico Ferrannini, (Notary)
- Avv. Angela Esentato, (Notary)
- Rev. Giuseppe Palazzo, (Notary)
- Rev. John Sweeney, L.C., (Notary)
