= Luigi Capotosti =

Italian Cardinal

His Eminence Luigi Capotosti
- Datary of the Apostolic Dataria
- Church: Roman Catholic Church
- Appointed: 23 September 1933
- Term ended: 16 February 1938
- Predecessor: Raffaele Scapinelli di Leguigno
- Successor: Federico Tedeschini
- Other post: Cardinal-Priest of San Pietro in Vincoli (1926-38)
- Previous posts: Bishop of Modigliana (1906-14); Secretary of the Congregation for the Sacraments (1914-26); Titular Archbishop of Thermæ (1915-26); Pro-Datary the Apostolic Dataria (1931-33); Camerlengo of the College of Cardinals (1935-36)

Orders
- Ordination: 19 September 1885 by Amilcare Malagola
- Consecration: 31 May 1908 by Carlo Castelli
- Created cardinal: 21 June 1926 by Pope Pius XI
- Rank: Cardinal-Priest

Personal details
- Born: Luigi Capotosti; 23 February 1863 Monte Giberto, Papal States
- Died: 16 February 1938 (aged 74) Rome, Kingdom of Italy

Styles of Luigi Capotosti
- Reference style: His Eminence
- Spoken style: Your Eminence
- Informal style: Cardinal
- See: none

Luigi Capotosti (February 23, 1863 – February 16, 1938) was an Italian Cardinal of the Roman Catholic Church who served as Apostolic Datary from 1933 until his death, and was elevated to the cardinalate in 1926.

== Biography ==
Luigi Capotosti was born in Monte Giberto, and studied at the seminary in Fermo before being ordained to the priesthood in 1885. He then served as private secretary to the Archbishop of Fermo (Amilcare Malagola and then Roberto Papiri), professor at the Seminary of Fermo, official of the archdiocesan curia, and canon of the metropolitan cathedral chapter.

On April 8, 1906, Capotosti was appointed Bishop of Modigliana by Pope Pius X, receiving his episcopal consecration on the following May 31 from Archbishop Carlo Castelli, OSC. He was later named Secretary of the Sacred Congregation for the Discipline of the Sacraments on June 8, 1914. As Secretary, Capotosti served as the second-highest official of that dicastery, successively under Cardinals Filippo Giustini and Michele Lega. He was promoted to Titular Archbishop of Thermae Basilicae on January 22, 1915.

Pope Pius XI created him Cardinal Priest of San Pietro in Vincoli in the consistory of June 21, 1926. After serving as papal legate to the National Eucharistic Congress in Loreto on August 30, 1930, Capotosti was appointed Pro-Apostolic Datary on July 29, 1931, rising to become full Datary on September 23, 1933. He was papal legate to the Regional Eucharistic Congress in Piacenza on July 30, 1933, and Camerlengo of the Sacred College of Cardinals from April 1, 1935 to June 15, 1936.

The Cardinal died in Rome, at age 74. He was buried in the crypt of the Sacred Congregation of Propaganda Fide at the Campo Verano cemetery before his remains were relocated to the parish church of Moresco in Ascoli Piceno.

Catholic Church titles
| Preceded by Sante Mei | Bishop of Modigliana; 1906–1914 | Succeeded by Ruggero Bovelli |
| Preceded by Filippo Giustini | Secretary of the Sacred Congregation for the Discipline of the Sacraments; 1914–1926 | Succeeded by Domenico Jorio |
| Preceded by Raffaele Scapinelli di Léguigno | Apostolic Datary; 1931–1938 | Succeeded by Federico Tedeschini |
| Preceded by Achille Locatelli | Camerlengo of the Sacred College of Cardinals; 1935–1936 | Succeeded by Lorenzo Lauri |
