= Ellen Organ =

Irish child mystic (1903–1908)

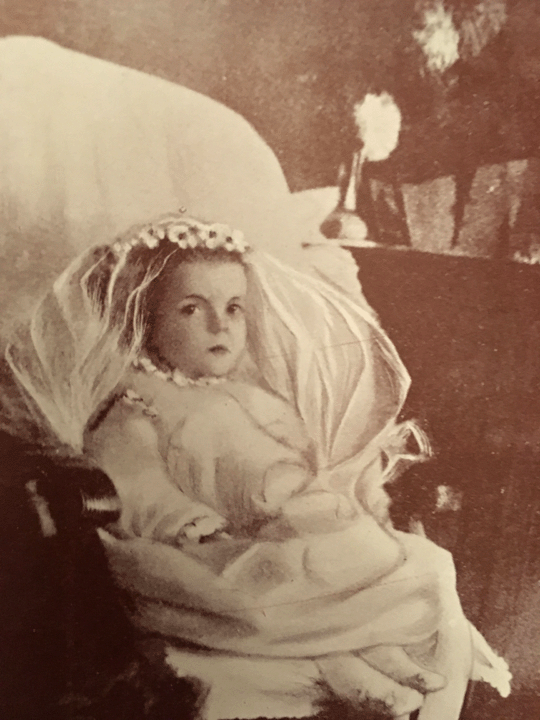
- Portrait of Ellen Organ, aged 4 c. 1907.
- Born: August 24, 1903; Waterford, Ireland
- Died: February 2, 1908 (aged 4); Cork, Ireland
- Resting place: Saint Joseph's Cemetery, Cork, Ireland (1908-1909); Good Shepherd Sisters Convent Cemetery, Sunday's Well, Cork, Ireland (1909-present)
- Monuments: Tomb in Good Shepherd Sisters Convent Cemetery, Cork, Ireland
- Other names: Little Nellie of Holy God; The Little Violet of the Blessed Sacrament

Ellen Organ (August 24, 1903 – February 2, 1908), known as Little Nellie of Holy God, was an Irish child, venerated by some in the Roman Catholic Church for her precocious spiritual awareness and alleged mystical life. Particularly dedicated to the Eucharist, the story of her life inspired Pope Pius X to admit young children to Holy Communion. In 1910, Pope Pius X issued the decree Quam singulari, which lowered the age of Holy Communion for children from 12 years to around 7, the "age of discretion".

== Early life ==
She was born in Waterford City, Ireland, the daughter of William Organ and Mary Ahern: she was the youngest of four children. While baptised Ellen, she was always called Nellie. Her father had been a laborer but earning very little; he had joined the army in 1897. In 1905, he was transferred to Spike Island, an island fort situated in Cork harbour. Here, while the family hoped for better times, Ellen's mother Mary fell ill, and for over a year she struggled to raise her family as her health declined. In January 1907, she died of tuberculosis. With four children all under the age of nine, William found it impossible to raise them and maintain his job. A helpful neighbour helped from time to time, but he was beginning to feel the strain.

Meanwhile, Ellen Organ, already a delicate child, was displaying signs of disability: it seems a serious fall as a baby had left its mark. Her spine had become crooked, her hips and back, out of joint, caused her constant pain and as she grew she became unable to sit up straight.

William finally realised he could not care for the children himself and, in May 1907, he put each of his four children into care. Ellen Organ and her sister Mary were sent first to a hospital run by the Sisters of Mercy – the two girls were found to be suffering from whooping cough. Then later they went to Saint Finbarr's Industrial School in Sunday's Well in Cork City, administered by the Good Shepherd Sisters.

== Life in the orphanage ==
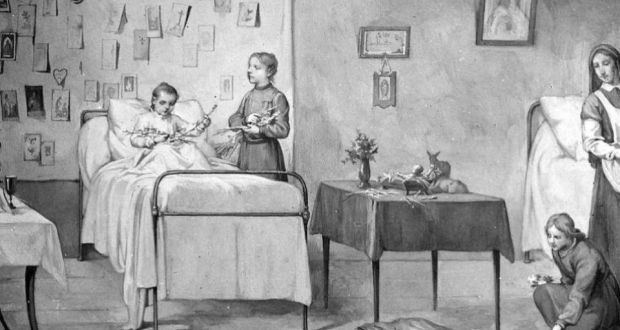
Ellen Organ lives in the Convent of the Good Shepherd Sisters.

Ellen Organ lived for eight months under the care of the Good Shepherd Sisters. She spent most of her time in the infirmary.

== Her religious experiences ==
She loved to visit the chapel which she called the House of Holy God, and she was fascinated by the statues and images on display, and in particular by the Stations of the Cross. When told the story of the suffering and death of Jesus she burst into tears. It is claimed that she developed a mysterious awareness of the Blessed Sacrament. One story relates how she knew a member of staff had not been to Mass that day, even though the young woman said she had. You did not get Holy God today the child said. This episode and others like it led some Catholics to believe that she had what is referred to as the mystical gift of "discernment".

Meanwhile, she began to claim to have visions. She related how she saw Christ – usually as a little child like herself – and the Virgin Mary. On a number of occasions, she claimed to have seen the Infant of Prague dancing for her. Her already precocious faith was growing, and those who came to know her testified to her holiness. She so impressed the sisters they began to entertain the possibility of recommending the child for the sacrament of confirmation. Contacting the local bishop, he agreed, and she was confirmed on October 8, 1907.

== First Communion ==
The child soon began to ask to receive Holy Communion. At first the sisters hesitated – she was too young for that sacrament. Wondering if she understood what the Eucharist was, they observed her at prayer in the chapel and saw that she was captivated by the tabernacle, which she usually referred to as the lock-up. Ellen had been born in the army barracks, where the prison was called the lock-up. Upon seeing the Eucharist in the tabernacle, she regarded Jesus as the prisoner in the lockup. During Mass when her carers came back from Communion, the child would ask them to kiss her so she could somehow share in their Communion.

According to the rules of the Roman Catholic Church no child could receive Communion before a certain age. A four-year-old child was thought to be at least six years too young. The sisters spoke with a Jesuit priest who ministered to the community, and while he was hesitant, he decided to come to speak to the child. After spending some time with her he came to the conclusion that she had reached the age of reason, albeit at an extraordinarily young age. He brought the matter to the bishop's attention who, after thinking about it for a short while, consented, and Ellen Organ made her First Communion on December 6, 1907.

== Last months ==
Between December 1907 and February 1908, Ellen Organ's health declined. She was in constant pain. Given the times, there was little that could be done. The sisters tried to make her as comfortable as possible. Various visitors, including the Bishop of Cork, noticed her fortitude and her intense prayer life. She was constantly happy. At this stage tuberculosis had set in and she was suffering from caries, making it difficult and painful for her to eat. The mouth disease caused a horrible odour which her caregivers treated with disinfectant. She did not complain of the pain this caused her as she instead, holding the crucifix in her small hands, contemplated the pain that Christ endured during the crucifixion, stating, Poor Holy God. Poor Holy God. It was noted by the sisters and nurses that after she began receiving Holy Communion, the smell completely disappeared. All she wanted at this stage was to receive Communion. She was also aware that she was going to die soon, and this did not trouble her: it made her happy – in fact she was looking forward to it.

== Death ==
After some four years of life, Ellen Organ died on February 2, 1908. Witnesses said she appeared to see something at the foot of her bed which caused her to smile and her eyes to well with tears. She followed that something with her eyes, looking overhead, when she died.

In contrast with other inmates of institutions run by the Good Shepherds, who were often buried in mass graves, she was buried in Saint Joseph's Cemetery in the city of Cork. When, a year later, in 1909 her body was exhumed, it appeared unchanged from the day of her burial, with her limbs flexible and her dress and Communion veil like new. Her grave in the public cemetery attracted visitors from all over Ireland, as a result of which authorisation was given for her remains to be transferred to the cemetery of the Good Shepherd Sisters.

== Influence ==
Ellen Organ's life story caused her to become known as Little Nellie of Holy God and her fame spread throughout Ireland and beyond, even reaching Pope Pius X in Rome.

Numerous books have been written about her, including a major study in French by the friar Bernard des Ronces: Nellie, la petite Violette du Saint Sacrement, morte en odeur de sainteté à l'âge de 4 ans et 5 mois, a book that, according to Reginald Garrigou-Lagrange, "aroused wonder and delight in Pope Pius X".

Despite devotion to her over the years, the Catholic Church has not opened a cause for her canonisation.

== Bibliography ==
- Authentic Sources compiled in The Life of Little Nellie of Holy God, Tan Books, Rockford, Illinois, 2007.
- "Ellen Organ", in Ann Ball, Young Faces of Holiness, Our Sunday Visitor Publishing, 2004, p. 45-52.
- Maire Cotter, Little Nellie of Holy God - A Lily Aflame - On the Life of Nellie Organ, 1956, 67 pages.
- Bernard Des Ronces, Nellie, la petite violette du Saint-Sacrement, Maison du Bon Pasteur, Paris, 1908, 240 pages.
- Sister Mary Dominic, R.G.S., Little Nellie of Holy God Tan Books, 2006.
- Leo Madigan.'Miniature: Nellie Organ 1903–1908. The Definitive Biography.' Fatima-Ophel Books. 2011. 318 pages.
- Leo Madigan, Princesses of the Kingdom: Jacinta Marto and Nellie Organ, Kolbe Publications, Cork, 2001
- Sarah Ellen Collins Saucier, Ellen, My Joy, Xulon Press, 2008, 140 pages.
