= Frequent Communion =

Eucharistic practice

Frequent Communion is the Roman Catholic practice of receiving the Eucharist frequently, as opposed to the usual medieval practice of receiving it once or a few times a year, by going to mass on Sundays.

Although it is argued that in the early church the norm was communion of all Christians present at Mass, before the Twentieth Century communion among the Catholic laity tended to be quite infrequent, sometimes only once a year. In the early modern period, this was partly informed by the Jansenist fear that frequent communion would erode the faith.

In the early Twentieth Century this began to change. Pope Leo XIII in his encyclical Mirae caritatis in 1902 argued for frequent communion as a source of renewal of faith with his successor Pius X arguing in his motu proprio Sacra Tridentina that the laity should receive communion as frequently as possible. In his encyclical Quam singulari Pius also relaxed restrictions on reception of Communion for the sick and children.

Regarding weekly versus daily communion, St. Francis de Sales encouraged weekly communion, but he neither encouraged nor discouraged daily communion.

== Bibliography ==
- Antoine Arnauld, De la fréquente communion (1643)
