= Federico Tedeschini =

Italian Cardinal

His Eminence Federico Tedeschini
- Datary of the Apostolic Dataria
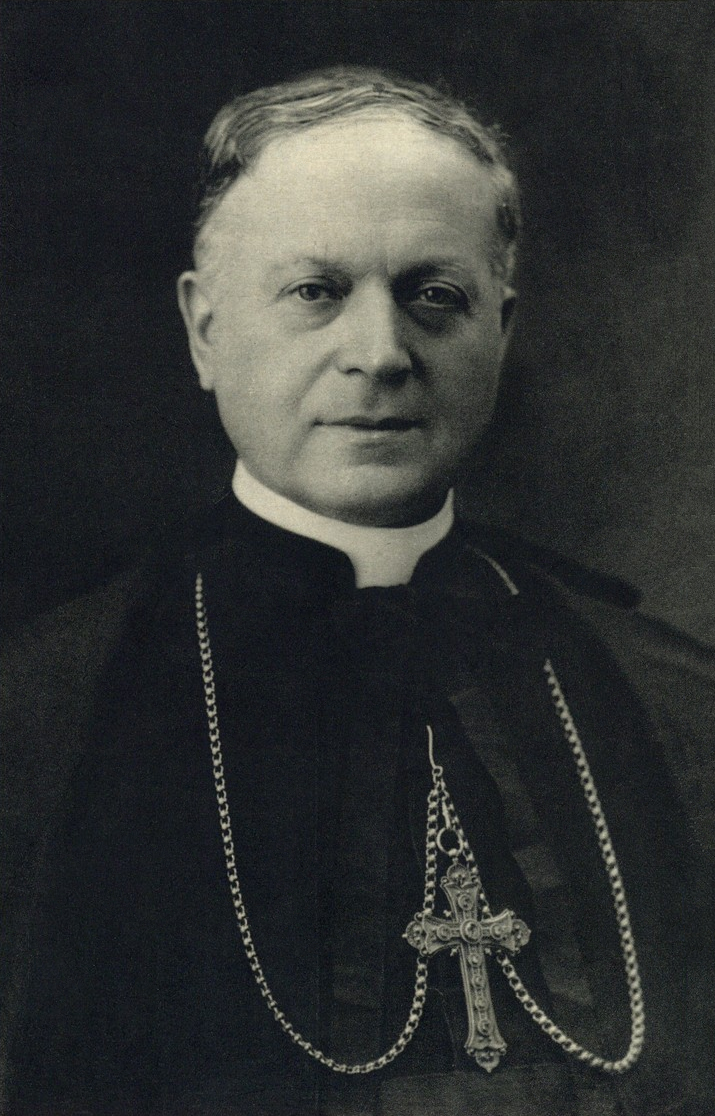
- Cardinal Tedeschini, c. 1951
- Church: Roman Catholic Church
- Appointed: 25 February 1938
- Term ended: 2 November 1959
- Predecessor: Luigi Capotosti
- Successor: Paolo Giobbe
- Other posts: President of the Congregation of the Basilica of Saint Peter (1939–59); Archpriest of Saint Peter's Basilica (1939–59); Cardinal-Bishop of Frascati (1951–59)
- Previous posts: Chancellor of Apostolic Briefs (1908–1914); Substitute for General Affairs (1914–21); Apostolic Nuncio to Spain (1921–35); Titular Archbishop of Naupactus (1921–35); Apostolic Pro-Nuncio to Spain (1935–38); Cardinal-Priest of Santa Maria della Vittoria (1936–51); Camerlengo of the College of Cardinals (1947–48)

Orders
- Ordination: 25 July 1896 by Domenico Rinaldi
- Consecration: 5 May 1921 by Pope Benedict XV
- Created cardinal: 13 March 1933 (in pectore); 16 December 1935 (revealed) by Pope Pius XI
- Rank: Cardinal-priest (1936–51); Cardinal-bishop (1951–59)

Personal details
- Born: Federico Tedeschini; 12 October 1873 Antrodoco, Kingdom of Italy
- Died: 2 November 1959 (aged 86) Rome, Italy
- Buried: Vatican grotto
- Parents: Patrizio Tedeschini; Rosa Serani
- Education: Pontifical Major Roman Seminary
- Motto: Omnia et in omnibus Christus
- Coat of arms

Styles of Federico Tedeschini
- Reference style: His Eminence
- Spoken style: Your Eminence
- Informal style: Cardinal
- See: Frascati (suburbicarian)

Federico Tedeschini (12 October 1873 – 2 November 1959) was an Italian cardinal of the Holy Roman Church who served as papal datary in the Roman Curia from 1938 until his death, and was elevated to the cardinalate in 1933 in pectore (published 1935) by Pope Pius XI.

== Biography ==
Born in Antrodoco, in Lazio, Tedeschini studied at the seminary in Rieti and, together with his fellow theologian Eugenio Pacelli, later to be Pope Pius XII, at the Pontifical Roman Seminary, before being ordained to the priesthood on 25 July 1896. He then served as a seminary professor and canon theologian of the cathedral chapter in Rieti until 1901. Father Tedeschini was raised to the rank of privy chamberlain of his holiness on 6 November 1903, and chancellor of the Secretariat of Briefs in the Roman Curia on 20 October 1908. He became substitute for general affairs, or deputy, of the Secretary of State on 24 September 1914.

On 31 March 1921, he became Apostolic Nuncio to Spain and on 30 April 1921 was appointed Titular Archbishop of Naupactus by Pope Benedict XV. He received his episcopal consecration on the following 5 May from Pope Benedict, with Archbishop Giovanni Nasalli Rocca di Corneliano and Bishop Agostino Zampini, OSA, serving as co-consecrators, in the Sistine Chapel. During his tenure as nuncio, Tedeschini founded the Spanish Catholic Action. With Spain on the brink of civil war, Pope Pius XI secretly (in pectore) elevated him to the College of Cardinals on 13 March 1933. His appointment was published in the consistory of 16 December 1935, and he became Cardinal-Priest of Santa Maria della Vittoria. He was named papal datary on 25 February 1938, and served as a cardinal elector in the 1939 papal conclave that selected Pope Pius XII,

=== Tedeschini and Pope Pius XII ===
Pope Pius XII appreciated in his former fellow student "a very special quality of spirit and heart". He appointed him his own successor as Archpriest of St. Peter's Basilica on 14 March 1939. He was appointed Cardinal Bishop of Frascati on 28 April 1951. In 1950, Pius XII gratefully acknowledged the participation of Tedeschini in preparing the proclamation of the dogma of the Assumption of the Virgin Mary and highlighted his role in the apostolic constitution Munificentissimus Deus. Sharing a special affection for the Virgin Mary, Pope Pius XII asked Tedeschini to be his representative at the centennial celebrations in Lourdes.

He participated in the conclave of 1958, which resulted in the election of Pope John XXIII. Cardinal Tedeschini died from cancer in Rome, at age 86, leaving his entire estate (merely $25,000) to his nephews. He is buried in the grotto of St. Peter's Basilica.

=== Sources ===
- Pio XII, Discorsi e Radiomessaggi di Sua Santità (Vol I-XX) Tipografia Poliglotta Vaticana, 1939-1959

Catholic Church titles
Preceded by Francesco Ragonesi	Apostolic Nuncio to Spain; 31 March 1921 – 25 February 1938	Succeeded by Gaetano Cicognani
Preceded by Luigi Capotosti	Papal Datary; 25 February 1938 – 2 November 1959	Succeeded by Paolo Giobbe
Preceded by Eugenio Pacelli	Archpriest of St. Peter's Basilica; 14 March 1939 – 2 November 1959	Succeeded by Domenico Tardini
Preceded by Francesco Marchetti-Selvaggiani	Cardinal-Bishop of Frascati; 28 April 1951 – 2 November 1959	Succeeded by Gaetano Cicognani
