= First communion =

Christian Eucharistic sacrament

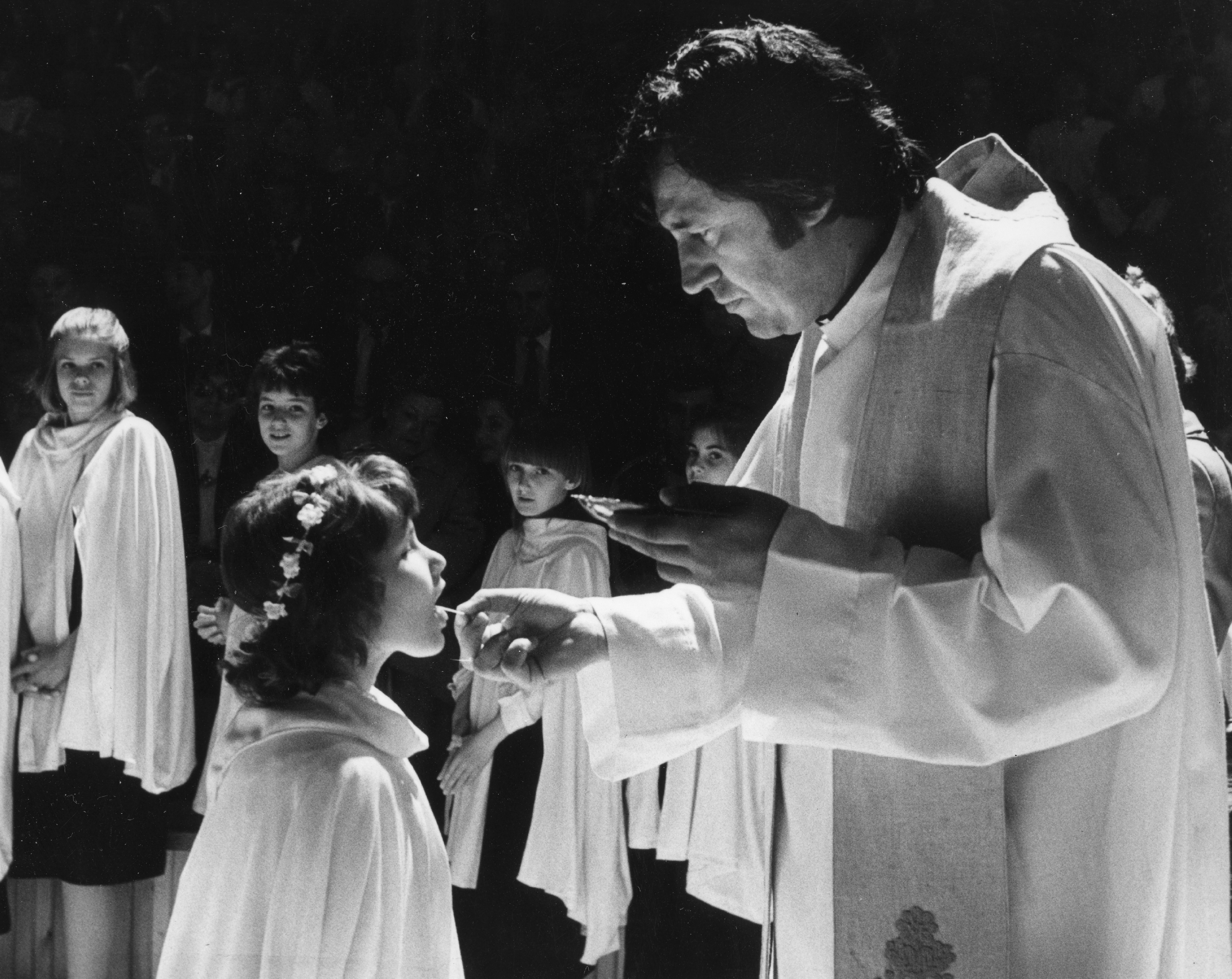
A Catholic girl receives First Communion in Hungary.

First communion is a ceremony in some Christian traditions during which a person of the church first receives the Eucharist. It is most common in many parts of the Latin Church of the Catholic Church, Lutheran Church and Anglican Communion (other ecclesiastical provinces of these denominations administer a congregant's First Communion after they receive baptism and confirmation). In churches that celebrate a rite of First Communion separate from baptism or confirmation, it typically occurs between the ages of seven and thirteen, often acting as a rite of passage. In other denominations first communion ordinarily follows the reception of confirmation, which occurs at some point in adolescence or adulthood, while Eastern Orthodox and Oriental Orthodox Christians first receive the sacrament of Holy Communion in infancy, along with Holy Baptism and Chrismation.

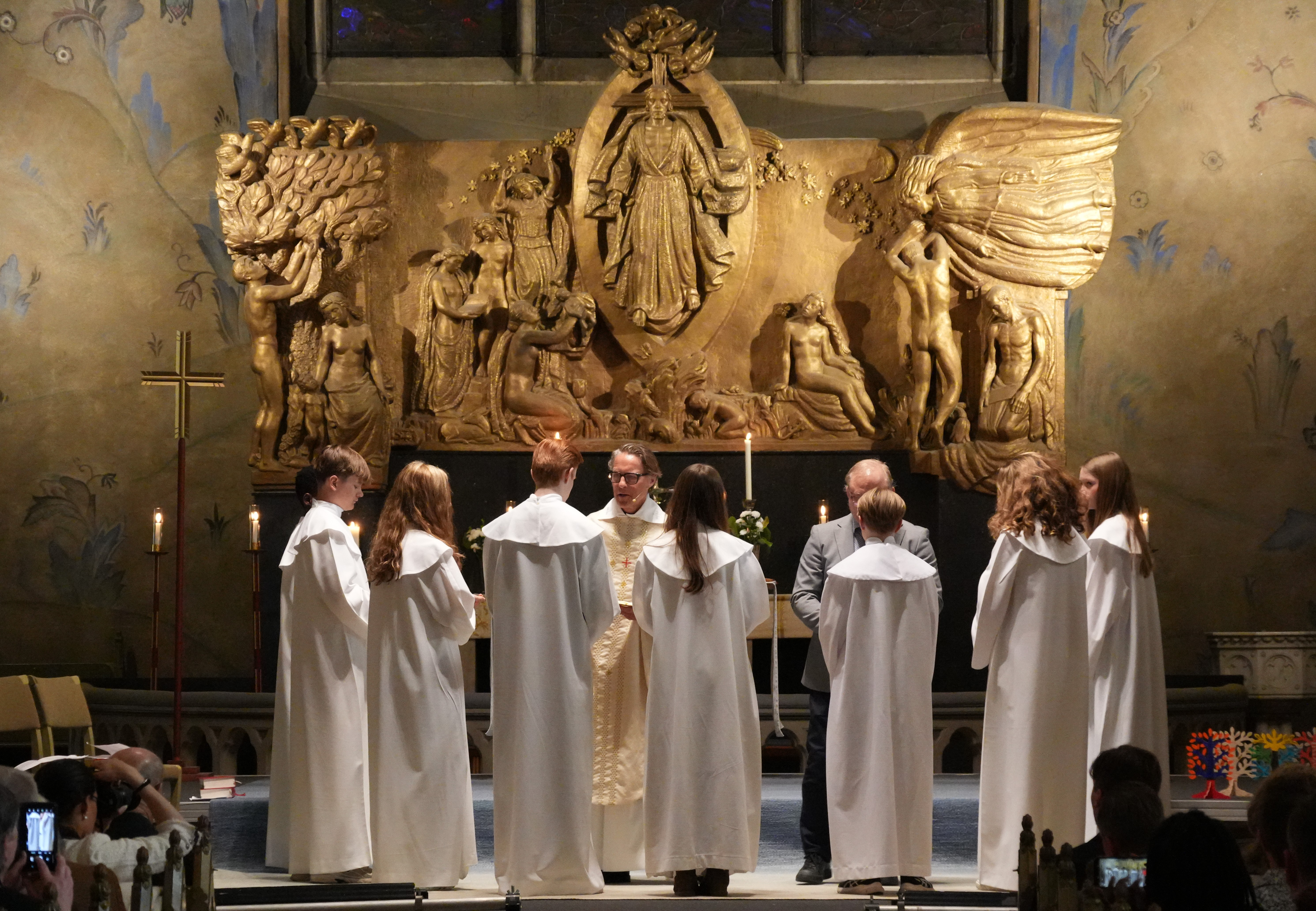
A group of Lutheran confirmants in the Church of Sweden receives communion during their confirmation mass in Oscar Church, Stockholm. It may or may not be their individually very first time since the Church of Sweden nowadays distribute communion also to children, although it is still common for many to receive it for the first time during confirmation.

== Characteristics ==
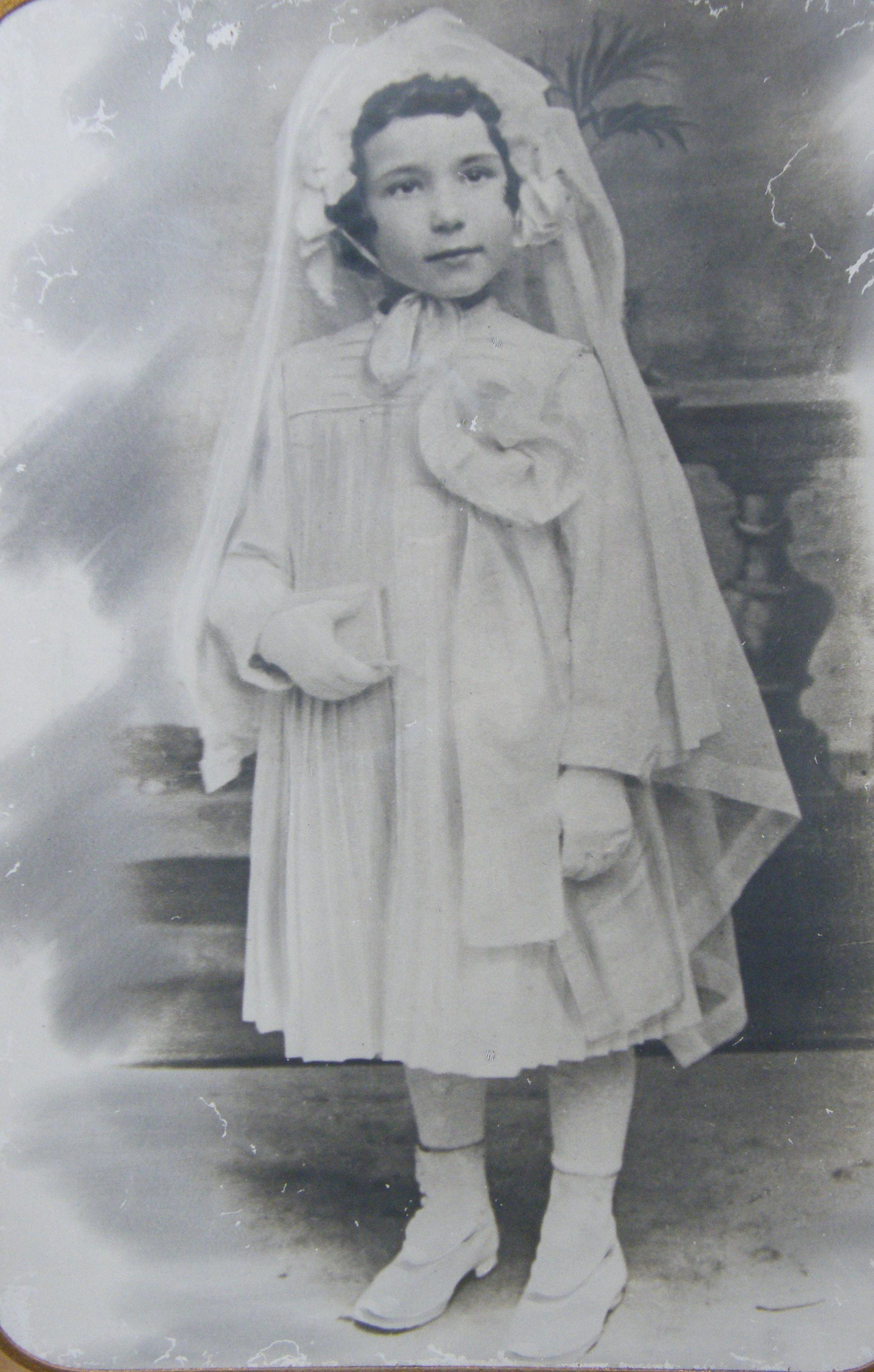
A little girl photographed for First Communion in Italy, c. 1919

Catholics believe this event to be very important, as the Eucharist occupies a central role in Catholic theology and practice.

First Communion is not celebrated in the Eastern Orthodox churches, the Oriental Orthodox churches or the Assyrian Church of the East, as they practice infant communion (which often is simultaneously administered with infant baptism and confirmation). Some Anglicans allow infant communion, while others require the previous reception of confirmation, usually during the teenage years.

The celebration of this ceremony is typically less elaborate in many Protestant churches. Catholics and some Protestants believe that Christ is truly present in the Eucharist; Catholics believe this is through transubstantiation, Lutherans believe that this is through a sacramental union, Methodists believe that the way Christ is made manifest in the Eucharistic elements is a Holy Mystery, and the Reformed affirm a pneumatic presence. Other denominations have varying understandings, such as the Eucharist being a symbolic meal and means of remembering Christ's last supper.

== Traditions ==
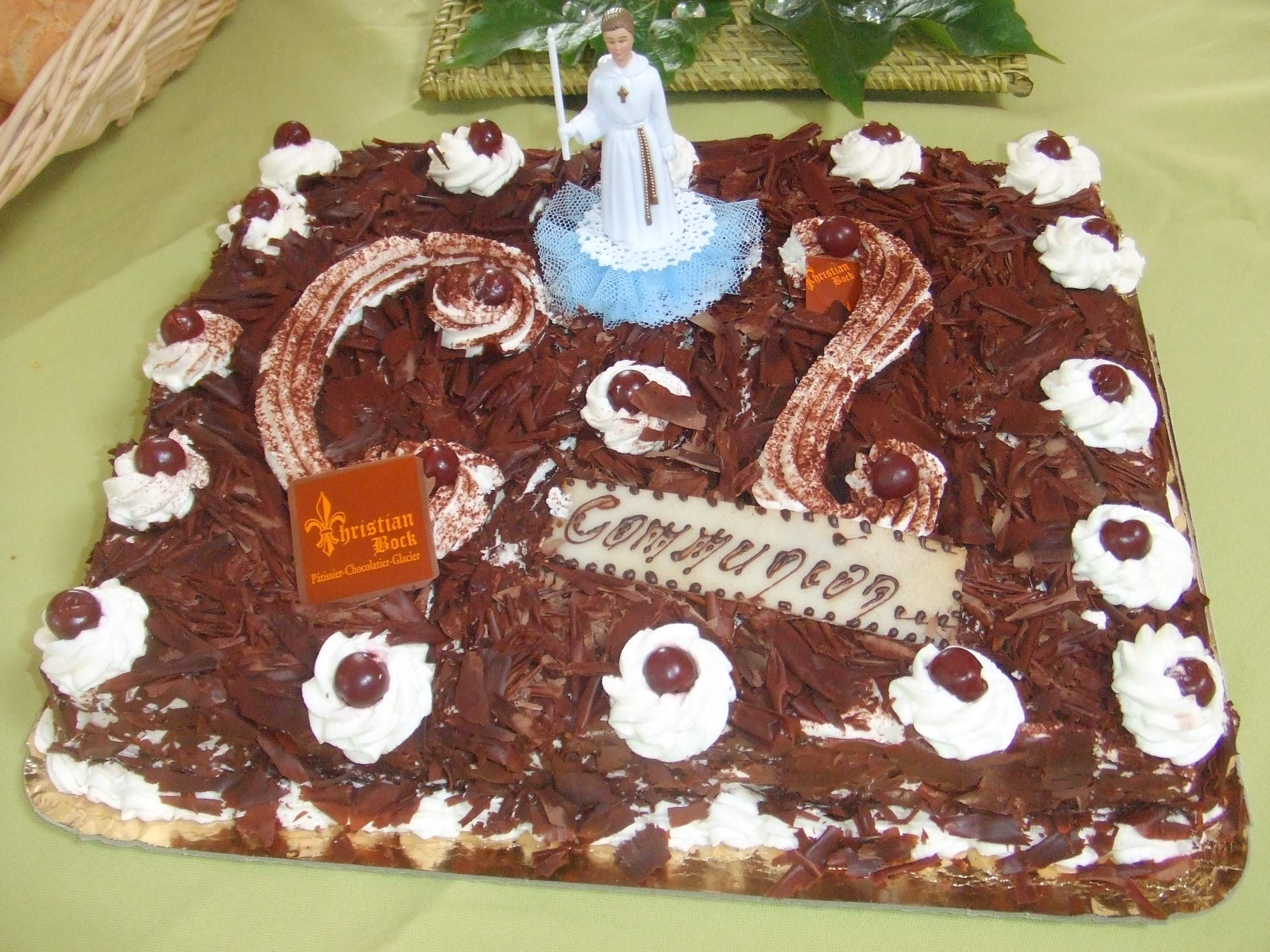
Christian families may have cakes for their children on the day that they make their First Communion.

First Communion is an important tradition for Catholic families and individuals. For Latin Church Catholics, Holy Communion is usually the third of seven sacraments received; it occurs only after receiving Baptism, and once the person has reached the age of reason (usually, around the second grade). First confession (the first sacrament of penance) must precede one's first reception of the Eucharist. For those entering into the Catholic Church as adults, Confirmation occurs immediately before first Communion. In 1910, Pope Pius X issued the decree Quam singulari, which changed the age at which First Communion is taken to 7 years old, due to the case of Ellen Organ. Previously, local standards had been 10 or 12 or even 14 years old. Byzantine Catholics celebrate the sacraments of baptism, confirmation (Chrismation), and Holy Communion on the same day as an infant's baptism.

Traditions of celebration surrounding First Communion usually include large family gatherings and parties to celebrate the event. The first communicant wears special clothing. The clothing is often white to symbolize purity, but not in all cultures. Often, a girl wears a fancy dress and a veil attached to a chaplet of flowers or some other hair ornament. In other communities, girls commonly wear dresses passed down to them from sisters or mothers, or even simply their school uniforms with the veil or wreath. Boys may wear a suit and tie, tuxedo, their Sunday best, or national dress, with embroidered armbands worn on the left arm and occasionally white gloves.

In many Latin American countries, boys wear military-style dress uniforms with gold braid aiguillettes. In Switzerland, both boys and girls wear plain white robes with brown wooden crosses around their necks. In Spain, Germany, Luxembourg, Austria, and Guam, girls are dressed up as brides, although this has been partly replaced by albs in recent times. In Scotland, boys traditionally wear kilts and other traditional Scottish dress which accompany the kilt. In Ireland, the girls wear a white dress accompanied with a veil and a bag containing a prayer book while the boys wear a suit with a white Rosette medal on the jacket. In the Philippines, First Communion services often occur on or around the Feast of the Immaculate Conception (the country's patron saint), with boys donning either the barong tagalog or semi-formal Western dress, and girls a plain white dress and sometimes a veil. In Vietnam, girls wear white áo dài with a veil, though this is not always the case.

Gifts of a religious nature are usually given, such as Bibles, children's or teenager's daily devotional books, rosaries, prayer books, religious statues, icons, and holy cards. Monetary gifts are also common.

Many families have formal professional photographs taken in addition to candid snapshots in order to commemorate the event. Some churches arrange for a professional photographer after the ceremony.

== Gallery ==
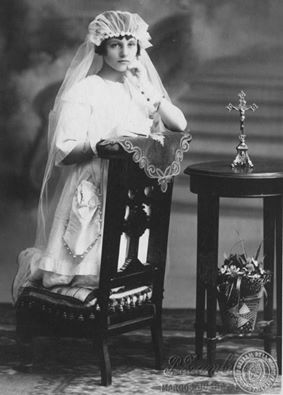
First Communion photo of a girl in Argentina, 1923

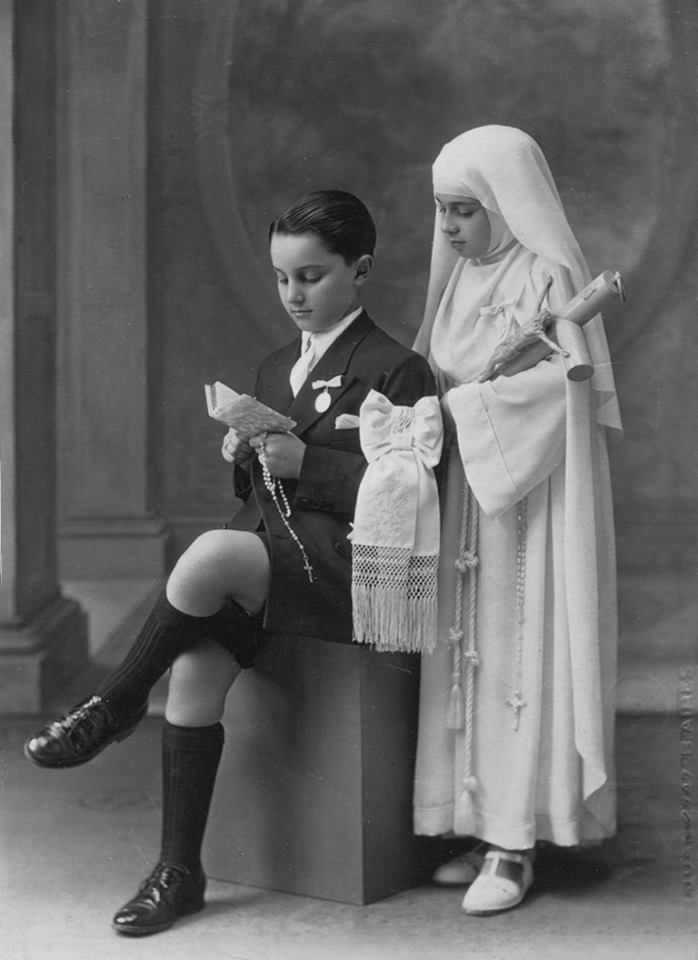
Children from Argentina in 1920

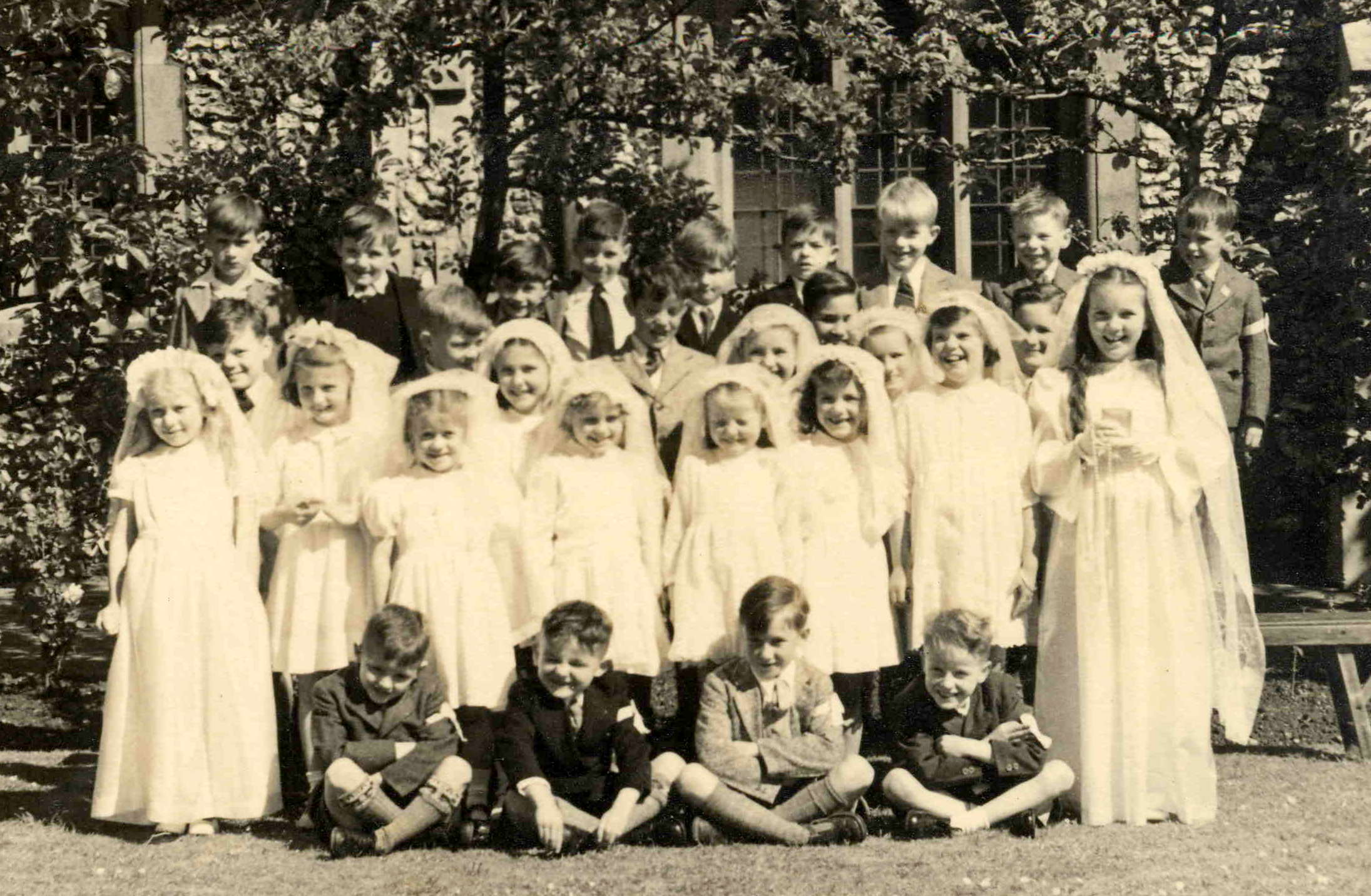
Children from Holyrood School at England, in 1949

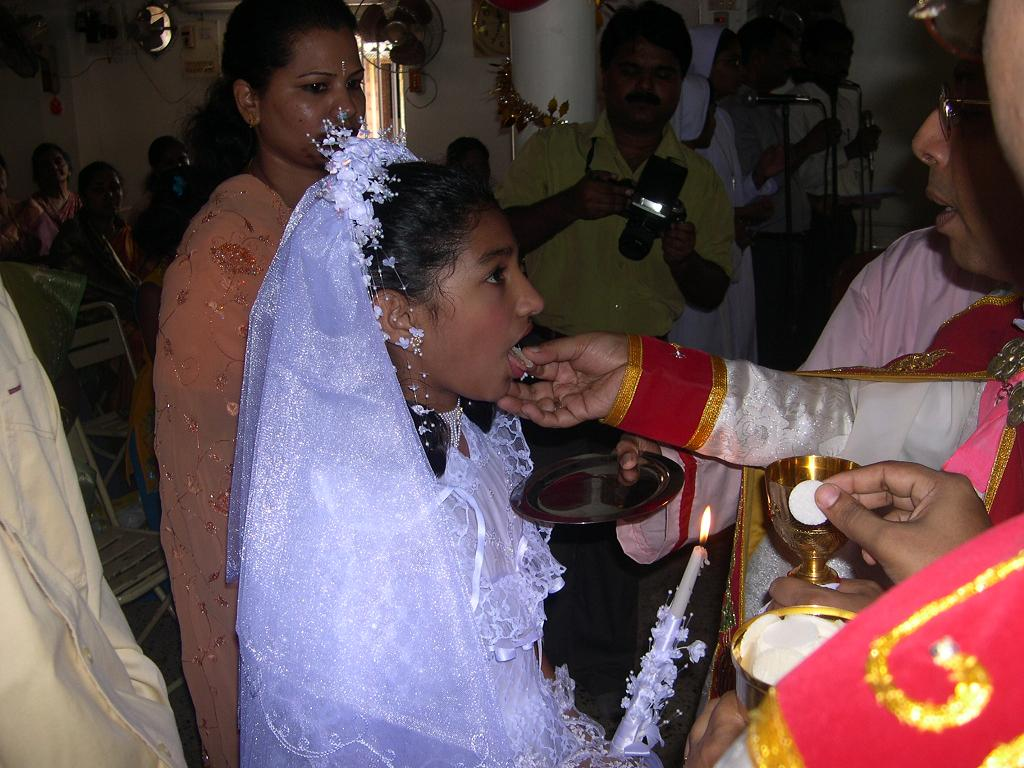
An Indian girl receiving her First Communion

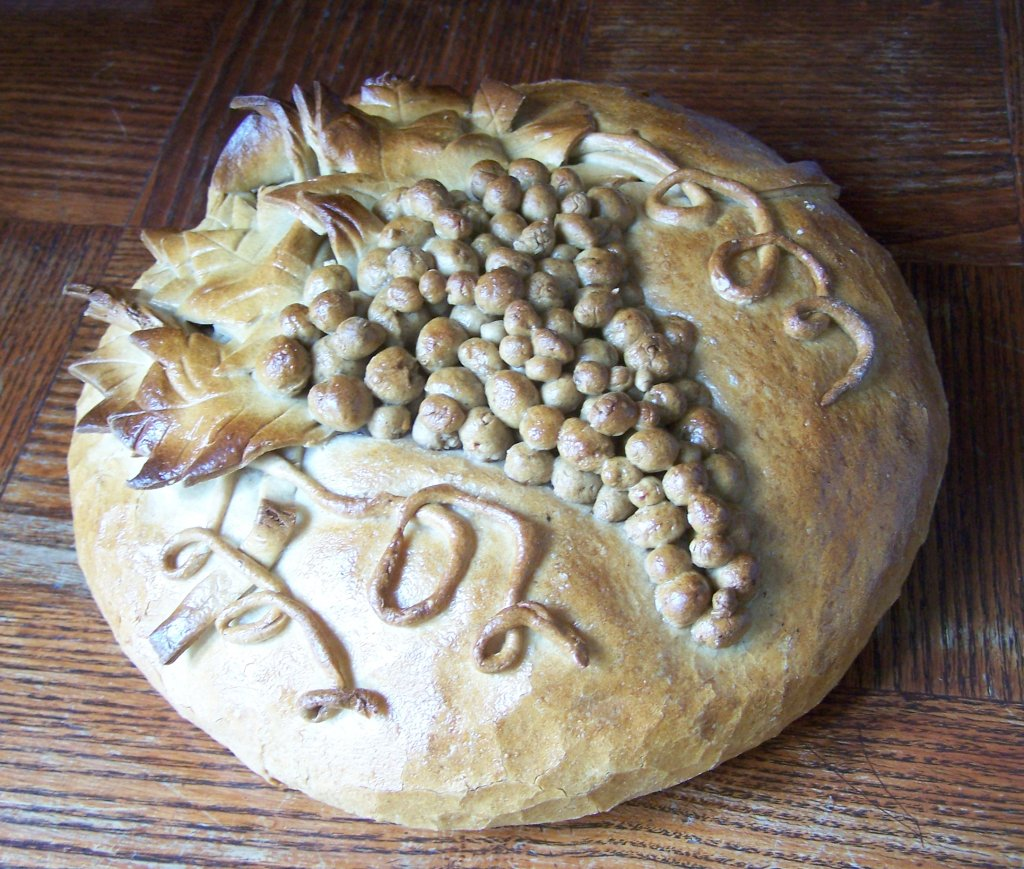
The decorated bread is a gift for the Catholic Church from children who had their first Communion in Poland.

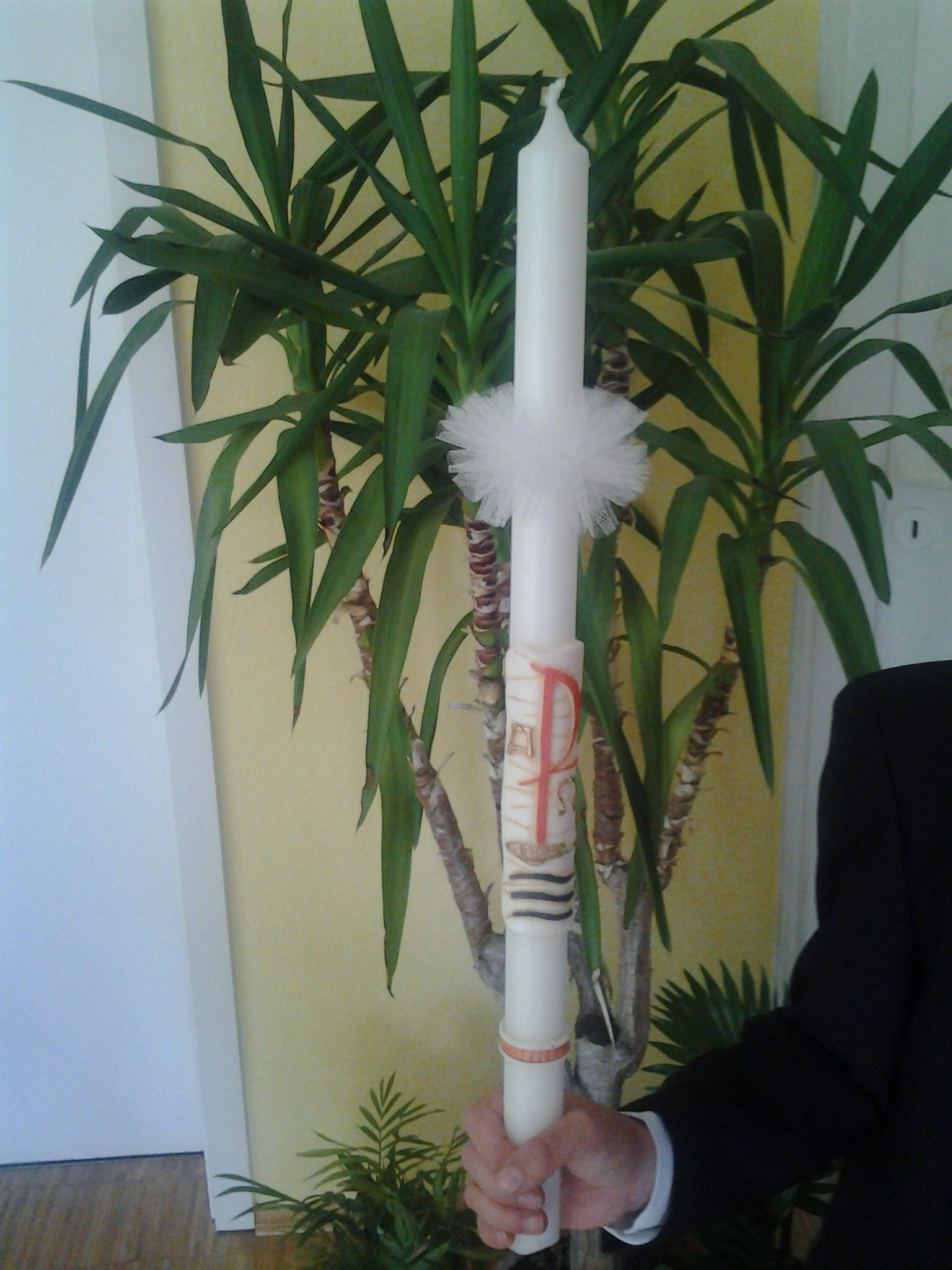
Candle as used for First Communion

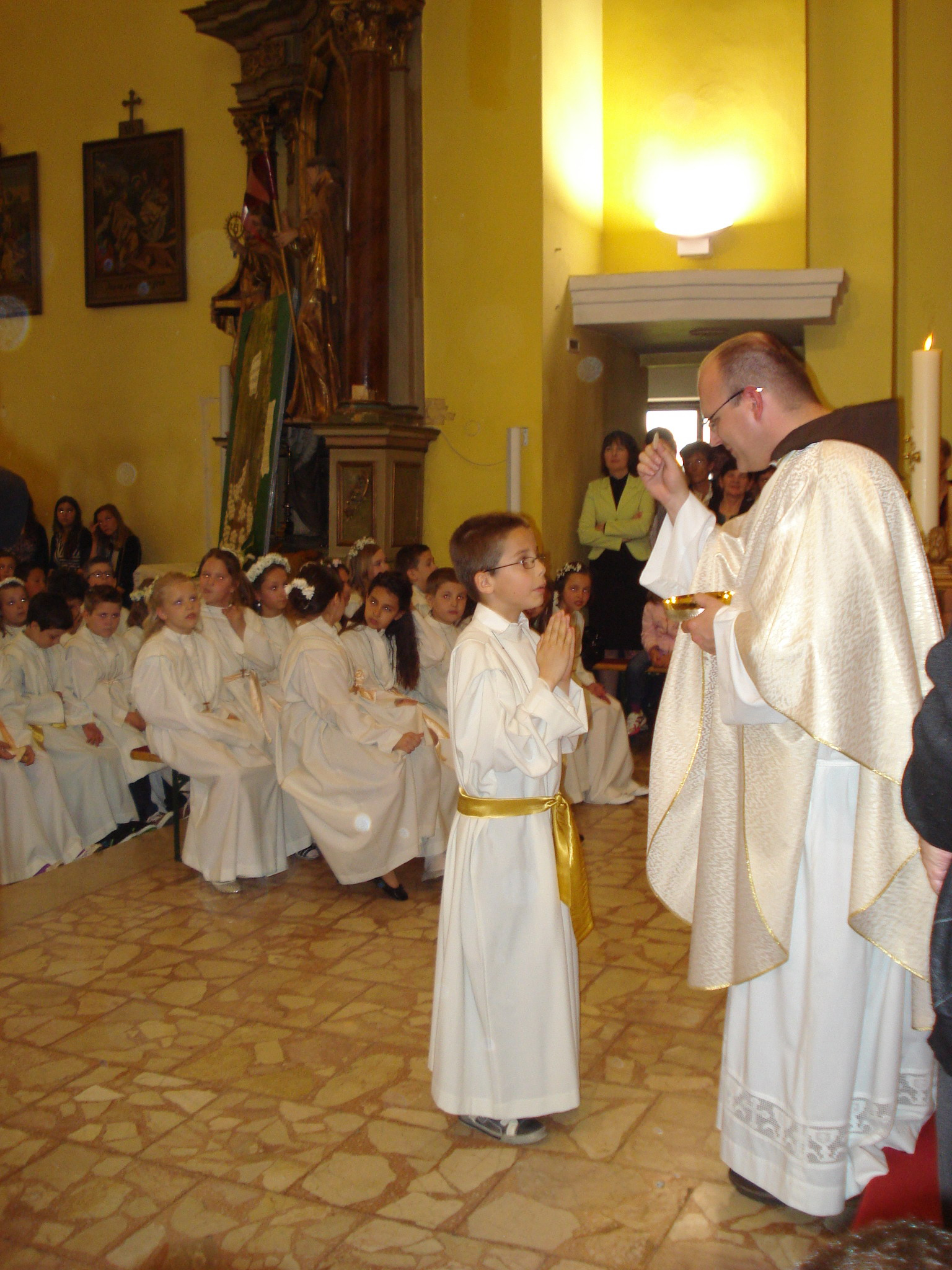
2014 First Communion ceremony in the St. Nicholas Church in Čakovec, Croatia

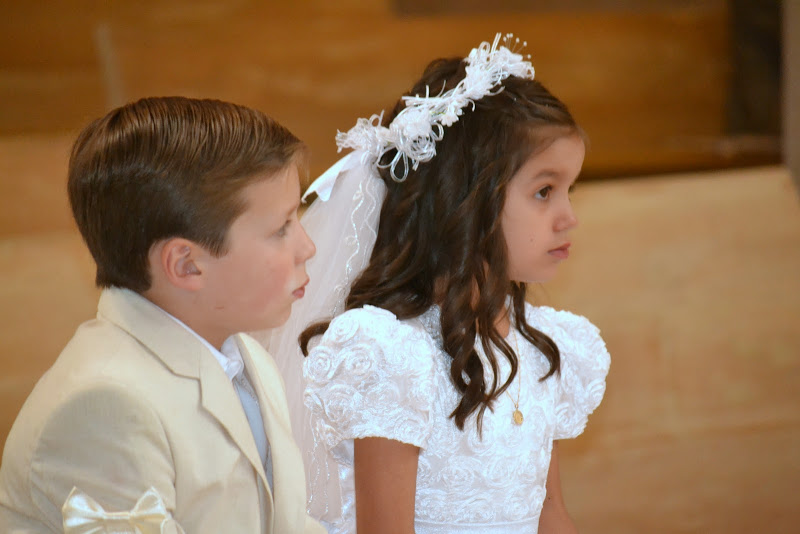
First Communion in Mexico City, Mexico

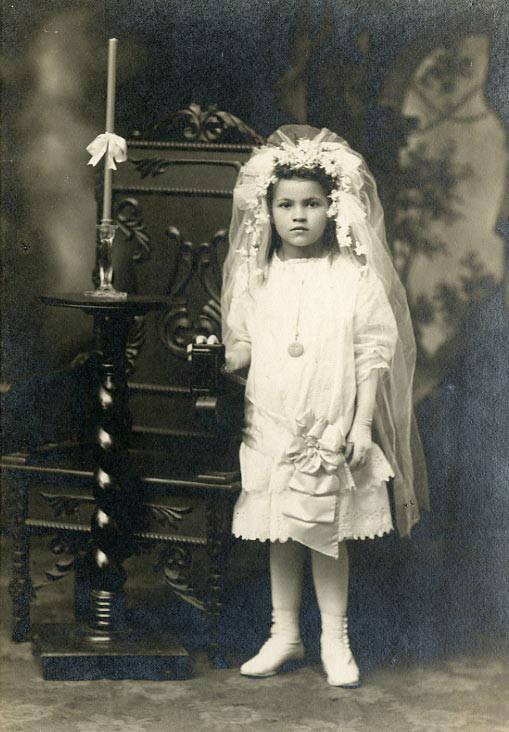
First Communion in Toledo, Ohio, c. 1920

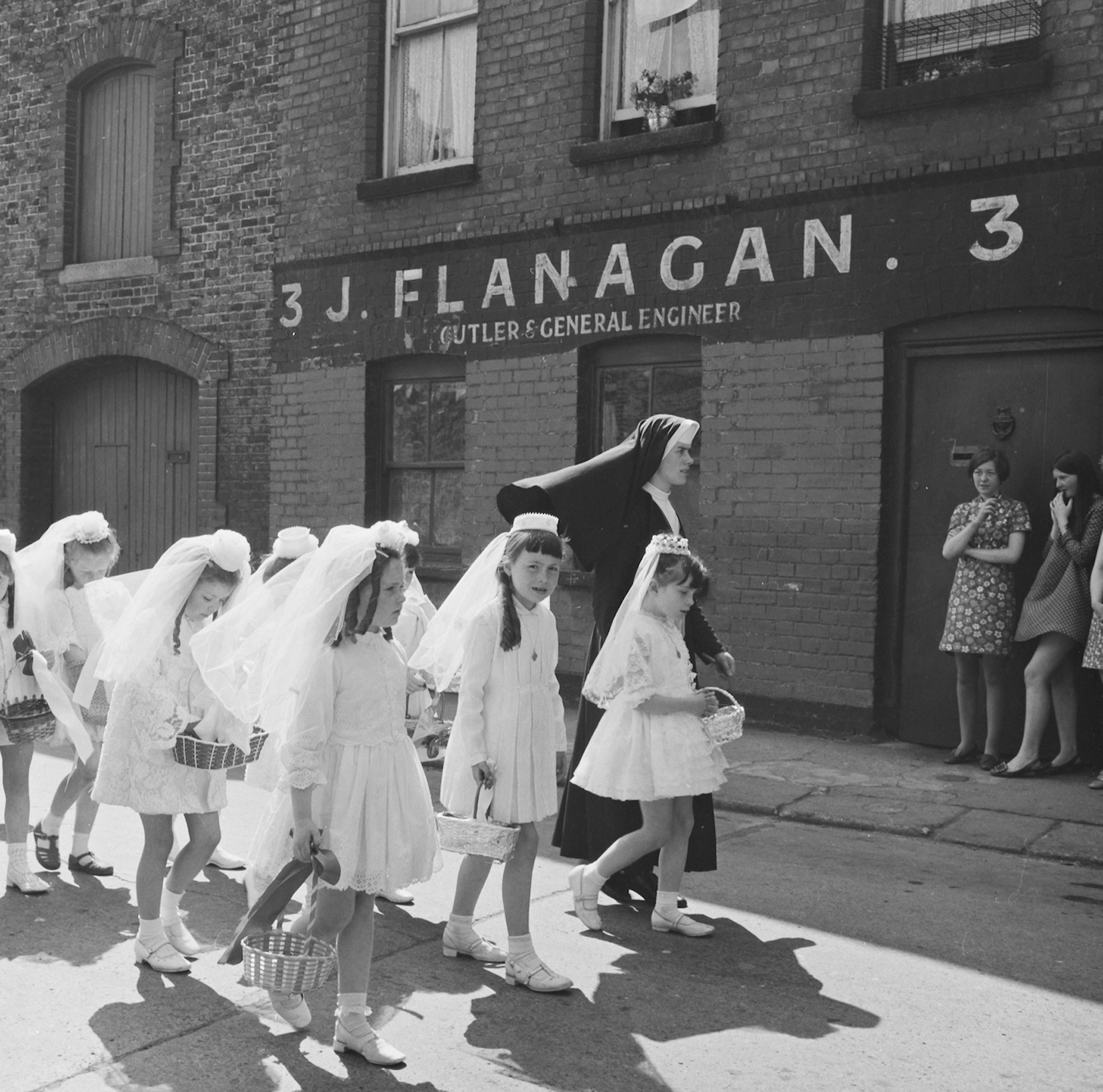
Holy Communion girls, Dublin, Ireland, on the Feast of Corpus Christi, 1969

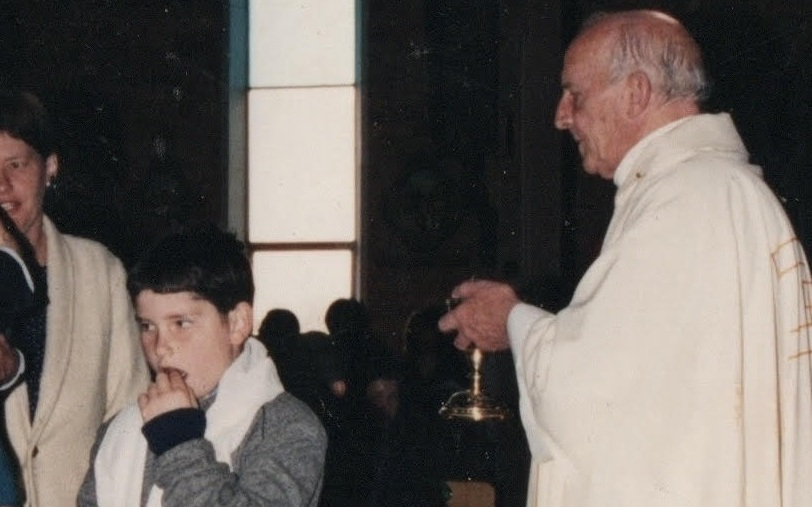
Priest giving First Communion to a boy in 1998 in Church at Victoria, Australia

== See also ==
- Communion and the developmentally disabled
- Confirmation
- Parish register
