= Pope Leo XIII and Russia =

The relationship between Pope Leo XIII and Russia was characterized by attempts by the Holy See to secure greater Church rights for Catholics in the Russian Empire.

== Relationship with Alexander II ==
Leo XIII began his pontificate with a friendly letter to Tsar Alexander II, in which he reminded the Russian monarch of the millions of Catholics living in his empire, who would like to be good Russian subjects, provided their dignity is respected.

He appealed to the generosity of the Tsar, since Vatican-Russian relations were at a low point. The Tsar replied in an equally friendly manner and promised actions towards equal treatment of all Catholics in the empire. As during the pontificate of Pope Pius IX, this turned out to be relative, since most problems were at the local level.

== Russian language in Catholic Churches ==
As negotiations started, Russian demands for the use of Russian language in Catholic Churches including the Polish and Lithuanian provinces, was unacceptable to the Vatican. Pope Leo XIII threatened to appeal directly to all Catholics in Russia.

== Vacant episcopal sees ==
Some progress was made in the occupation of vacant Episcopal sees, but an emotional breakthrough was the Papal encyclical Quod apostolici muneris of December 28, 1878, denouncing nihilism, Marxism, and radicalism, which was dear to the Russian monarch, whose life was in danger from Far Left paramilitary forces. Repeated assassination attempts against Tsar Alexander II by the terrorist organization Narodnaya Volya caused the Pope to further escalate his warnings, which were read aloud in all Catholic Churches.

== Coronation of Alexander III ==
After the assassination of Alexander II, the Pope sent a high-ranking representative to the coronation of his successor. Alexander III was grateful and asked for all religious forces to unify. He asked the Pope to ensure that his bishops abstain from political agitation. In March 1894, the Pope published an encyclical to the Bishops of Poland. Observers wrote that this encyclical called for the bishops to "obey to authority." Relations improved further, when Pope Leo XIII, due to Italian considerations, distanced the Vatican from the Rome, Vienna, Berlin alliance and helped to facilitate a rapprochement between Paris and St. Petersburg.

== Status of Ruthenians and Poles ==
Meanwhile, the Ruthenians, such as the 13 Pratulin Martyrs during the forced Conversion of Chełm Eparchy, continued to face religious persecution for being members of the Eastern Catholic Churches and Rome was unable to assist. The Russian Government also protested against Polish nationalist groups allegedly using their parish churches for anti-Tsarist activism, and the Pope found himself in the same dilemma as his predecessor Pope Pius IX. He was personally attacked for being perceived as not insisting upon Pope Gregory XI's law of idiom in the face of coercive Russification and linguistic imperialism targeting the Polish language and other heritage languages like it. Meanwhile, without attacking the Pope personally, the Russian Government openly accused all members of the Catholic Church in Russia of disloyalty to the House of Romanov, largely because the Catholic hierarchy in the Russian Empire insisted upon defending their independence from control by the State.

== Relationship with Nicholas II ==
After the elevation of Tsar Nicolas II in 1894, Pope Leo XIII was able to reach additional agreements in 1896, which resulted in better conditions for the faithful, numerous specific dispensations and permits, and additional appointments of bishops. However, he was not able to reopen the nunciature in St. Petersburg. His pontificate ended with atmospheric improvements between the Vatican and Russia. In 1899 Nicholas II and Queen Wilhelmina of the Netherlands used Pope Leo XIII's offices in their attempts to establish a peace conference of European nations.
