= Redemptionis sacramentum =

Redemptionis sacramentum ("Sacrament of Redemption") is an instruction on the proper way to celebrate Mass in the Roman Rite and others, and considered as well the adoration of the Blessed Sacrament. It was issued by the Congregation for Divine Worship and the Discipline of the Sacraments on 25 March 2004 over the signature of the Congregation's prefect, Cardinal Francis Arinze. It was designed to aid bishops in implementing the Roman Missal, issued in 2002. It follows Pope John Paul II's 2003 encyclical, Ecclesia de Eucharistia calling for an Instruction on the liturgical norms.

As its reason for issuing the document, the congregation stated:

It is not possible to be silent about the abuses, even quite grave ones, against the nature of the Liturgy and the Sacraments as well as the tradition and the authority of the Church, which in our day not infrequently plague liturgical celebrations in one ecclesial environment or another. In some places the perpetration of liturgical abuses has become almost habitual, a fact which obviously cannot be allowed and must cease.

The instruction discusses, among other things, the roles of the clergy and laity, distribution of communion, and Eucharistic adoration outside of Mass. It is based on the 1963 Sacrosanctum Concilium (the Constitution on the Sacred Liturgy).

The congregation declared:

The Mystery of the Eucharist 'is too great for anyone to permit himself to treat it according to his own whim, so that its sacredness and its universal ordering would be obscured'. On the contrary, anyone who acts thus by giving free rein to his own inclinations, even if he is a Priest, injures the substantial unity of the Roman Rite, which ought to be vigorously preserved, and becomes responsible for actions that are in no way consistent with the hunger and thirst for the living God that is experienced by the people today. Nor do such actions serve authentic pastoral care or proper liturgical renewal; instead, they deprive Christ's faithful of their patrimony and their heritage.

It addressed a variety of specific issues unrelated to abuses or departure from established norms. For example, it made clear that "Girls or women may also be admitted to this service of the altar, at the discretion of the diocesan Bishop and in observance of the established norms".

== See also ==
- Mirae caritatis
- Roman Missal
- Sacraments of the Catholic Church
