= Raffaele Scapinelli di Leguigno =

Italian Cardinal

His Eminence Raffaele Scapinelli di Leguigno
- Datary of the Apostolic Dataria
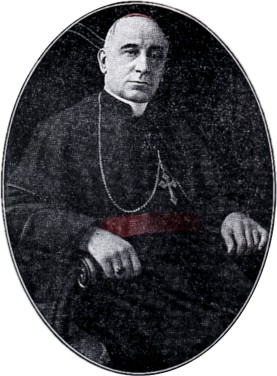
- Church: Roman Catholic Church
- Appointed: 22 July 1930
- Term ended: 16 September 1933
- Predecessor: Vincenzo Vannutelli
- Successor: Luigi Capotosti
- Other post: Cardinal-Priest of San Girolamo dei Croati (1916-33)
- Previous posts: Apostolic Nuncio to Austria-Hungary (1912-15); Titular Archbishop of Laodicea (1912-15); Apostolic Pro-Nuncio to Austria-Hungary (1915-16); Prefect of the Congregation for Religious (1918-20)

Orders
- Ordination: 1881
- Consecration: 25 February 1912 by Rafael Merry del Val
- Created cardinal: 6 December 1915 by Pope Benedict XV
- Rank: Cardinal-Priest

Personal details
- Born: Raffaele Scapinelli di Leguigno; 25 April 1858 Modena, Duchy of Modena and Reggio
- Died: 16 September 1933 (aged 75) Casa del Clero di Villa San Camillo, Forte dei Marmi, Massa-Carrara, Kingdom of Italy
- Buried: Campo Verano
- Education: Pontifical Academy of Ecclesiastical Nobles

Styles of Raffaele Scapinelli di Leguigno
- Reference style: His Eminence
- Spoken style: Your Eminence
- Informal style: Cardinal
- See: none

Raffaele Scapinelli di Leguigno (April 25, 1858 – September 16, 1933) was an Italian Cardinal of the Roman Catholic Church. He served as Prefect of the Congregation of the Affairs of Religious from 1918 to 1920, and was elevated to the cardinalate in 1915.

== Biography ==
Born in Modena, Raffaele Scapinelli di Leguigno studied at the seminary in Reggio-Emilia before being ordained to the priesthood in 1884. He then entered the Pontifical Ecclesiastical Academy in Rome, in 1887, eventually obtaining his doctorate in canon and civil law. From 1887 to 1889, Scapinelli was Professor of Canon Law at the Reggio-Emilia seminary.

Subsequently, entering the Roman Curia, he served as an official of the Vatican Secretariat of State until 1891. Scapinelli was secretary of the nunciature to Portugal from July 25, 1891 to 1894, whence he was named Auditor of the nunciature to the Netherlands on February 13, remaining in that position until 1905. He was appointed a canon of St. Peter's Basilica on April 11, 1902.

Scapinelli taught at the Pontifical Ecclesiastical Academy before becoming Secretary of the Commission for Administration of Wealth of Holy See on November 26, 1904. He was named a Domestic Prelate of His Holiness on July 25, 1905, and a protonotary apostolic supra numerum on the following August 29. On December 16, 1907, Scapinelli was placed in charge of the secretariat of the Sacred Congregation of Extraordinary Ecclesiastical Affairs. He was made Secretary of the Commission for Codification of Canon Law in 1908, and of the Congregation of Extraordinary Ecclesisatical Affairs on March 18 of that same year. Before being appointed Nuncio to Austria-Hungary on January 27, 1912, he was made Consultor of the Supreme Sacred Congregation of the Holy Office (April 23, 1908) and of the Sacred Consistorial Congregation (November 4, 1908).

On January 30, 1912, Scapinelli was appointed Titular Archbishop of Laodicea ad Libanum in association with his diplomatic post to Austria-Hungary. He received his episcopal consecration on the following February 25 from Cardinal Rafael Merry del Val, with Archbishop Vittorio Ranuzzi de' Bianchi and Bishop Agostino Zampini, OSA serving as co-consecrators, in the Matilda chapel of the Apostolic Palace.

Pope Benedict XV created him a Cardinal-Priest in the consistory of December 6, 1915, bestowing upon him the title of S. Girolamo degli Schiavoni on December 7, 1916. Scapinelli remained in Vienna until the end of 1916, and was awarded with the Grand Cross of the Austrian Order of Sankt Stefan that same year. The Cardinal later returned to the Roman Curia, serving as Prefect of the Sacred Congregation of the Affairs of Religious from December 19, 1918 until his resignation on March 6, 1920. He was one of the cardinal electors who participated in the 1922 papal conclave, which selected Pope Pius XI.

Scapinelli was appointed Apostolic Datary on July 22, 1930, and remained in that position until his death three years later, at the age of 75 in Forte dei Marmi. He is buried in the chapel of the Sacred Congregation for the Propagation of the Faith in Rome's Campo Verano cemetery.

Catholic Church titles
Preceded by Alessandro Bavona	Nuncio to Austria-Hungary; 1912–1916	Succeeded by Teodoro Valfre di Bonzo
Preceded by Giulio Tonti	Prefect of the Congregation of the Affairs of Religious; 1918–1920	Succeeded by Teodoro Valfre di Bonzo
Preceded by Vincenzo Vannutelli	Apostolic Datary; 1930–1933	Succeeded by Luigi Capotosti
