= Responsa =

Body of written legal decisions and rulings

Responsa (plural of Latin responsum, 'answer') comprise a body of written decisions and rulings given by legal scholars in response to questions addressed to them. In the modern era, the term is used to describe decisions and rulings made by scholars in historic religious law.

== In the Roman Empire ==
Roman law recognised responsa prudentium, i.e., the responses and thoughts of jurists, as one of the sources of ius scriptum (written law), along with laws originating from magistrates, from the Senate, or from the emperor.

A particularly well-known and highly influential example of such responsa was the Digesta (or Digests), in 90 books, the principal work of the prominent second century jurist Salvius Julianus. This was a systematic treatise on civil and praetorian law, consisting of responsa on real and hypothetical cases, cited by many later Roman legal writers.

== In the Catholic Church ==
In the Catholic Church, responsa are answers of the competent executive authority to specific questions (in Latin, dubia, literally "doubts") sent by Catholic bishops to the Holy See. Responsa given by the Pontifical Council for Legislative Texts which are promulgated as authentic interpretation have the force of law as per canon 16 §2 of the 1983 Code of Canon Law. Other responsa cannot have this binding force, but nevertheless possess a high authority.

Some responsa are given in Notitiae, the official journal of the Congregation for Divine Worship and the Discipline of the Sacraments (CDW). The responsa given in Notitiae are, according to the CDW, to be considered only as private responses unless they are published in official legal records of the Holy See.

== In Judaism ==
1981 responsum of Rabbi Shmuel Wosner, Shevet HaLevi, concerning the status of translated works of Torah, in response to a question from Rabbi Shlomo Sztencl

In rabbinic literature, the responsa are known as She'elot u-Teshuvot (Hebrew: שאלות ותשובות "questions and answers"), and comprise the body of written decisions and rulings given by poskim ("deciders of Jewish law"). A modern term, used mainly for questions on the internet, is "Ask the rabbi".

Judaism's responsa constitute a special class of rabbinic literature, to be distinguished from the commentaries (meforshim)—devoted to the exegesis of the Hebrew Bible, the Mishnah, the Talmud—and from the codes of law which delineate the rules for ordinary incidents of life.

The responsa literature covers a period of 1,700 years—the mode, style, and subject matter have changed as a function of the travels of the Jewish people and of the development of other halakhic literature, particularly the codes.

Responsa play a particularly important role in Jewish law. The questions forwarded are usually practical, and often concerned with new contingencies for which no provision has been made in the codes of law, and the responsa thus supplement the codes. They, therefore, function as a source of law, in a manner similar to legal precedent, in that they are consulted by later decisors (poskim) in their rulings; they are also, in turn, incorporated into subsequent codes.

In addition to requests for halakhic rulings, many of the questions addressed were theoretical in character, particularly among the earlier responsa. The responsa thus contain rulings on ethics, business ethics, the philosophy of religion, astronomy, mathematics, history, geography, as well as interpretations of passages in the Bible, the Mishnah, the Talmud, and the Midrash. Thus, while early Jewish literature has few historical works, many notes on the history of Judaism have been introduced into the responsa.

Responsa thus contain valuable information about the culture of the Jews and the people among whom they lived. Information may also be gleaned about the moral and social relations of the times, occupations, the household, customs, expressions of joy and of sorrow, and recreations, and even games. Older responsa are also important for readings and emendations of the Mishnah and the Talmud.

== In Islam ==
A similar use of responsa (here called fatwā) is found in Islam.

== See also ==
- Papal rescript
- Rescript
