= Teodoro Valfre di Bonzo =

His Eminence Teodoro Valfrè di Bonzo
- Prefect of the Congregation for Religious
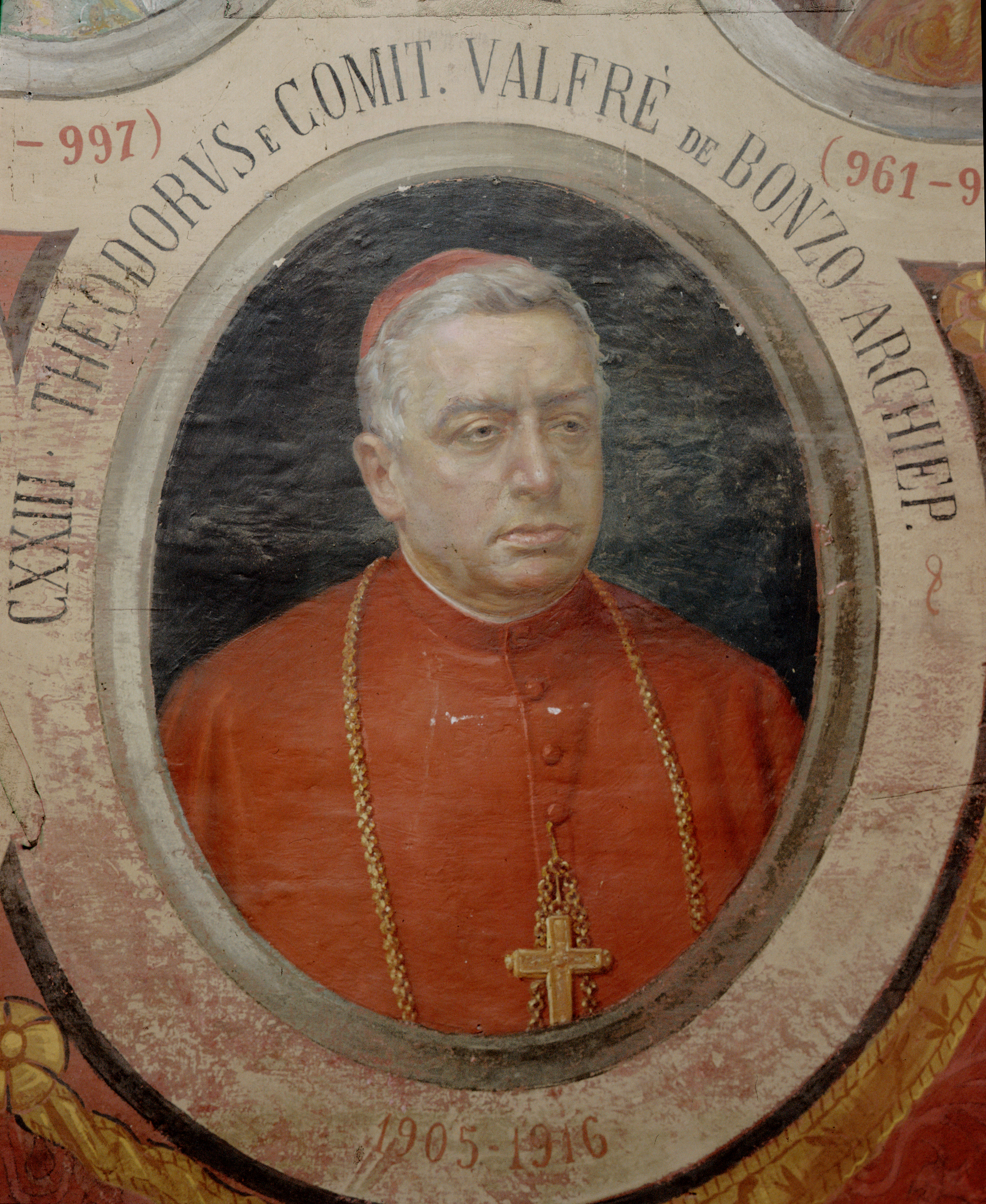
- Church: Roman Catholic Church
- Appointed: 6 March 1920
- Term ended: 25 June 1922
- Predecessor: Raffaele Scapinelli di Leguigno
- Successor: Camillo Laurenti
- Other post: Cardinal-Priest of Santa Maria sopra Minerva (1919–22)
- Previous posts: Apostolic Delegate to Costa Rica (1884–85); Apostolic Delegate to Nicaragua (1884–85); Apostolic Delegate to Honduras (1884–85); Bishop of Cuneo (1885–95); Bishop of Como (1895–1905); Archbishop of Vercelli (1905–16); Titular Archbishop of Trapezus (1916–19); Apostolic Nuncio to Austria (1916–19)

Orders
- Ordination: 10 June 1876
- Consecration: 3 May 1885 by Gaetano Alimonda
- Created cardinal: 15 December 1919 by Pope Benedict XV
- Rank: Cardinal-Priest

Personal details
- Born: Teodoro Valfrè; 21 August 1853 Cavour, Turin, Kingdom of Sardinia
- Died: 25 June 1922 (aged 68) Rome, Kingdom of Italy
- Parents: Giacinto Valfrè; Erminia del Carretto
- Education: University of Turin; Roman Seminary; Pontifical Ecclesiastical Academy
- Coat of arms

Styles of Teodoro Valfre di Bonzo
- Reference style: His Eminence
- Spoken style: Your Eminence
- Informal style: Cardinal
- See: Trebizonda (titular see)

Teodoro Valfrè di Bonzo J.C.D. S.T.D. (21 August 1853 – 25 June 1922) was a Cardinal of the Roman Catholic Church and was former Prefect of Sacred Congregation of Religious.

== Early life ==
He was born in Cavour, Italy as the son of Count Giacinto Valfrè and Erminia del Carretto. He was educated at the Seminary of Turin and later at the University of Turin where he earned a doctorate in theology in 1876. He received minor orders on 7 March 1875 and the subdiaconate on 18 December 1875 and the diaconate on 1 April 1876. He was a classmate and friend of Giacomo della Chiesa, who was to be the future Pope Benedict XV. He was ordained on 10 June 1876 and earned a doctorate in canon law in 1880.

He was created Domestic prelate of His Holiness and was appointed as Apostolic delegate and extraordinary envoy to Costa Rica on 11 July 1884. However, his mission was delayed because of the outbreak of the antireligious movement prevalent at the time with diplomatic relations not normalized until 1908.

== Episcopate ==
He was appointed Bishop of Cuneo on 27 March 1885 by Pope Leo XIII. He was transferred to the diocese of Como on 18 March 1895. He was promoted to the metropolitan see of Vercelli by Pope Pius X on 27 March 1905. He was transferred to the titular see of Trebizonda in 1916 and appointed as Nuncio to Austria-Hungary on 14 September that year. He represented the Pope Benedict XV at the coronation of the new Austrian Emperor Karl I and Empress Zita.

== Cardinalate ==
He was created and proclaimed Cardinal-Priest of Santa Maria sopra Minerva in the consistory of 15 December 1919 by Pope Benedict.

On 3 February 1920, he was appointed cardinal protector of the Trinitarians.

He was appointed as Prefect of Sacred Congregation of Religious on 6 March 1920. He took part in the conclave of 1922 that elected Pope Pius XI. He died in 1922.

Catholic Church titles
Preceded by Raffaele Scapinelli di Leguigno	Prefect of Sacred Congregation of Religious; 6 March 1920 – 25 June 1922	Succeeded by Camillo Laurenti
