= Domenico Jorio =

His Eminence Domenico Jorio
- Prefect of the Congregation for Sacramental Discipline
- Church: Roman Catholic Church
- Appointed: 20 December 1935
- Term ended: 21 October 1954
- Predecessor: Michele Lega
- Successor: Benedetto Aloisi Masella
- Other post: Cardinal-Priest of Sant'Apollinare alle Terme Neroniane-Alessandrine pro hac vice (1946–54)
- Previous posts: Undersecretary of the Congregation for the Sacraments (1909–26); Secretary of the Apostolic Dataria (1918–28); Protonary Apostolic de numero of the Prefecture of the Holy Apostolic Palaces (1918–35); Secretary of the Congregation for Sacramental Discipline (1928–35); Cardinal-Deacon of Sant'Apollinare alle Terme Neroniane-Alessandrine (1935–46)

Orders
- Ordination: 17 September 1891
- Created cardinal: 16 December 1935 by Pope Pius XI
- Rank: Cardinal-Deacon (1935–46); Cardinal-Priest (1946–54)

Personal details
- Born: Domenico Jorio; 7 October 1867 Villa San Stefano, Ferentino, Papal States
- Died: 21 October 1954 (aged 87) Palace of the Holy Office, Rome, Italy
- Buried: Villa San Stefano
- Education: Pontifical Roman Seminary
- Motto: De forti dulcedo
- Coat of arms

Styles of Domenico Jorio
- Reference style: His Eminence
- Spoken style: Your Eminence
- Informal style: Cardinal
- See: none

Domenico Jorio S.T.D. J.U.D. (7 October 1867 – 21 October 1954) was a Cardinal of the Roman Catholic Church who served as Prefect of the Congregation for Discipline of Sacraments from 1935 until his death.

== Biography ==
Domenico Jorio was born in Villa Santo Stefano, Italy. He was educated at the Seminary of Ferentino and the Pontifical Roman Seminary in Rome, where he earned a doctorate in theology and a doctorate utriusque iuris (in both canon and civil law).

He was ordained on 17 September 1891 in Palestrina, and continued his studies in Rome. He worked in pastoral care in the diocese of Rome and as a staff member of the Apostolic Dataria from 1891 until 1918. He was created Privy Chamberlain of His Holiness on 15 November 1901 and was reappointed on 16 December 1903 and again on 9 September 1914. He was raised to the level of Domestic Prelate of His Holiness on 11 March 1915. He was again elevated to the level of Protonotary apostolic on 20 November 1918. He was appointed Secretary of the Congregation for Discipline of Sacraments on 5 January 1928.

He was made Cardinal-Deacon of Sant'Apollinare alle Terme Neroniane-Alessandrine in the consistory of 16 December 1935 by Pope Pius XI and on 20 December 1935 was appointed Prefect of the Sacred Congregation for the Discipline of the Sacraments. He participated in the conclave of 1939 that elected Pope Pius XII. After ten years as a Cardinal-Deacon, he opted to become a member of the order of cardinal priests.

Following Italy's invasion and occupation of Ethiopia, on 29 April 1937, Italy introduced race-based legislation for the first time. The Lessona Decree, named for Italy's Minister for Africa Alessandro Lessona, punished sexual relations between Italians and Ethiopians with imprisonment for one to five years. It was aimed more at longterm living arrangements, concubinage, than at casual encounters. Jorio produced an assessment on behalf of his Congregation on 24 August. It asserted at length the Church's belief that race could not be an impediment to marriage. Reflecting the controversy over eugenics a few years earlier in Germany, it said the Church granted "maximum freedom" even to those afflicted "by chronic hereditary disorders". It then welcomed the government's proscription of interracial concubinage as a first step toward outlawing concubinage in all its forms. It said the Church could encourage its missionaries "to prevent such hybrid unions for the wise hygienic and social motivations" the government had outlined. The Church, he offered, would do its part by not granting dispensations for intermarriage between Catholic and Muslims.

He died on 21 October 1954 in his apartment, in the Palace of the Holy Office, Rome. The funeral took place on 25 October 1954 in the church of Sant'Andrea della Valle. After the funeral, his body was buried in the church of Sant'Apollinare.
