= Notitiae =

- Discipline: Roman Catholic liturgy
- Language: Latin and various world languages

Publication details
- History: 1965-present
- Publisher: Sacra Congregatio pro Cultu Divino
- Frequency: Annually

Standard abbreviations
- ISO 4: Notitiae

Links
- Journal homepage; Online archive

Notitiae, subtitled Commentarii ad nuntia de re liturgica edenda, is the official journal of the Vatican Dicastery for Divine Worship and the Discipline of the Sacraments.

It was first published in 1965 by the Consilium for the Implementation of the Constitution on the Sacred Liturgy (Consilium ad exsequendam constitutionem de sacra liturgia) to provide the Holy See's official documents along with commentary, scholarly articles, new liturgical texts, reports of meetings, responses to dubia, and the speeches of the Pope on matters having to do with the liturgy of the Roman Rite.

In 2004, the journal's subtitle was shortened to simply Commentarii. In 2016 it switched to an online-only publishing model and yearly periodicity, and the following year scans of past issues were made available.
