= Apostolic expeditor =

Roman catholic clerical officer

Apostolic expeditors (in full, in Latin Expeditionarius literarum apostolicarum, Datariae Apostolicae sollicitator atque expeditor; in Italian simply Spedizionieri) are officials of the Roman Curia who attend to the sending of papal bulls, papal briefs and papal rescripts emanating from the Apostolic Chancery, the Dataria, the Sacred Paenitentiaria and the Secretariate of Briefs.

== History ==
In a restricted and specific sense, expeditors or expeditioners are laymen approved by the Dataria, after an examination, to act as agents for bishops or others before the Dataria or Apostolic Chancery. They are members of the Roman Court.

They differ from solicitors as well as from procurators or agents in general, who transact business with the Roman Congregations. A solicitor, strictly speaking, is an assistant to a procurator, doing the mechanical work of preparing documents. An expeditor is more concerned with matters of favour, privileges, dispensations and so on, than with cases in litigation. It has been the practice of the Dataria and Apostolic Chancery to carry on business only with authorized agents or expeditors, whose office it is to draw up and sign the necessary documents, receive and forward the answer given.

They receive a certain fixed fee for each transaction, while procurators and solicitors generally receive a monthly stipend. The number of expeditors has varied. Cardinal Pacca, pro-datarius, decided in 1833 that the number, which was then one hundred, should be regulated by the amount of business to be transacted. Around 1900 there were about thirty. In reorganizing the Roman Court, Pope Pius X deprived these expeditors of their exclusive right to appear before the Dataria and Apostolic Chancery.
