= Michele Lega =

Italian Catholic cardinal (1860–1935)

His Eminence Michele Lega
- Prefect of the Congregation of Sacramental Discipline
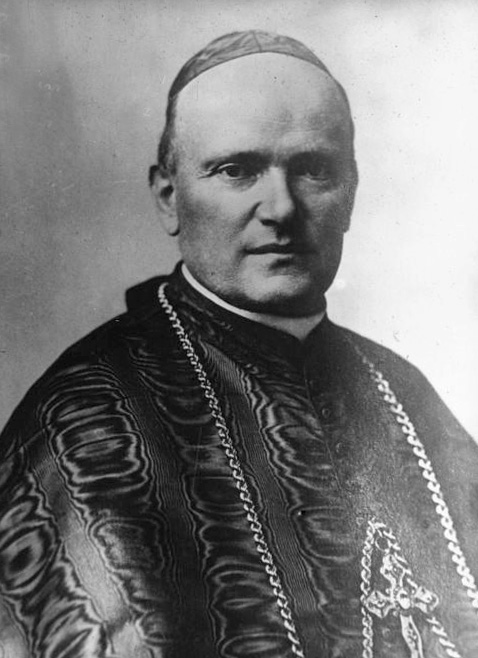
- Cardinal Lega pictured in 1922.
- Church: Roman Catholic Church
- Appointed: 20 March 1920
- Term ended: 16 December 1935
- Predecessor: Filippo Giustini
- Successor: Domenico Jorio
- Other posts: Cardinal-Bishop of Frascati (1926–35); Vice-Dean of the College of Cardinals (1931–35)
- Previous posts: Dean of the Roman Rota (1908–14); Cardinal-Deacon of Sant'Eustachio (1914–24); Prefect of the Apostolic Signatura (1914–20); Cardinal-Priest of Sant'Eustachio pro hac vice (1924–26)

Orders
- Ordination: 13 September 1883
- Consecration: 11 July 1926 by Pope Pius XI
- Created cardinal: 25 May 1914 by Pope Pius X
- Rank: Cardinal-Deacon (1914–24); Cardinal-Priest (1924–26); Cardinal-Bishop (1926–35)

Personal details
- Born: Michele Lega; 1 January 1860 Brisighella, Papal States
- Died: 16 December 1935 (aged 75) Rome, Kingdom of Italy
- Education: Pontifical Roman Athenaeum Saint Apollinare
- Motto: Ut unum sint

Styles of Michele Lega
- Reference style: His Eminence
- Spoken style: Your Eminence
- Informal style: Cardinal
- See: Frascati (suburbicarian see)

Michele Lega S.T.D. J.U.D. (1 January 1860 – 16 December 1935) was a Cardinal of the Roman Catholic Church who served as Prefect of the Congregation for the Discipline of Sacraments.

== Early life and priesthood ==
Michele Lega was born on 1 January 1860 in Brisighella, Italy. His mother was Countess Giulia Baldini di Rimini, his father was Giacomo Lega, an engineer and he was one of five children.

He was educated at the Seminary of Faenza and the Pontifical Roman Athenaeum S. Apollinare, where he earned doctorates in theology, philosophy and a doctorate utriusque iuris (in both canon and civil law) in 1888.

He was ordained on 13 September 1883, in the diocese of Faenza. He served as a faculty member of the Pontificio Collegio Urbano de Propaganda Fide in Rome from 1887 until 1889. He then held the position of professor of philosophy until 1890 as well as being assistant professor of canon law from 1888 to 1889. He was a faculty member of the Pontifical Roman Athenaeum S. Apollinare from 1889 to 1893. He was made Privy Chamberlain on 11 August 1897. He was a member of the Pontifical Commission for the Codification of Canon Law and thus helped edit the 1917 Code of Canon Law. He was the Dean of the Roman Rota from 1908 until 1914.

== Cardinalate ==
He was created and proclaimed Cardinal-Deacon of Sant'Eustachio in the consistory of 25 May 1914. He was one of the cardinal electors in the conclave of 1914 that elected Pope Benedict XV. He was appointed Prefect of the Congregation for Discipline of Sacraments on 20 March 1920. He also participated in the conclave of 1922 that elected Pope Pius XI. After ten years as a cardinal-deacon, he opted for the order of cardinal priests and his deaconry was elevated pro hac vice to title in 1924.

== Episcopate ==
He opted for the order of cardinal bishops and the suburbicarian see of Frascati on 21 June 1926. He was consecrated on 11 July of that year in the Sistine Chapel by Pope Pius XI. His brother Antonio attended the ceremony.

== Death ==
He died in 1935; the funeral took place on 20 December, in the basilica of Ss. XII Apostoli, Rome.

== Family ==
His brother, Antonio Lega was bishop of Cervia and archbishop of Ravenna.

His nephew Igino Lega went on to become a priest; he received the Medaglia D’Oro during WWII and was named as a Servant of God.

Catholic Church titles
| Preceded by Vincenzo Vannutelli | Prefect of the Supreme Tribunal of the Apostolic Signatura; 15 December 1914 – 20 March 1920 | Succeeded by Augusto Silj |
| Preceded by Filippo Giustini | Prefect of the Congregation for Discipline of Sacraments; 20 March 1920 – 16 December 1935 | Succeeded by Domenico Jorio |
