= Leo Madigan =

Leo Madigan (28 September 1939 – 25 July 2015) was a New Zealand author who settled in Fátima, Portugal.

== Early life and education ==
Madigan attended Saint Thomas' preparatory school in Naenae, Lower Hutt, New Zealand, run by the Sisters of Mercy, and the Sacred Heart secondary school in Auckland, run by the Marist Brothers. He went to sea as Catering Boy, MV Wendover, London, in 1956. From 1958 to 1960 he was a novitiate with the Trappist religious order (Order of Cistercians of the Strict Observance).

== Career ==
After work as a psychiatric nurse and a short spell in the Royal Horse Guards, Madigan appeared in minor roles on the London stage in 1963. From 1964 to 1975 he was a rating in the British Merchant Navy.

Madigan then attended Sidney Webb College and was awarded the BEd degree of the University of London in 1978. From 1979 to 1981 he worked in the educational arm of The Marine Society, edited The Seafarer magazine and taught at Gravesend Sea School. He taught at Fatih Lisesi (Fatih High School) in İzmir, Turkey from 1981 to 1982. He sailed to the Falkland Islands on MV Uganda for the Marine Society in 1982 before teaching in the London Borough of Tower Hamlets from 1983 to 1988.

In 1988, Madigan moved to Fuseta, in Algarve, Portugal, where he worked as a local journalist and published several books. He moved to the world-famous Marian apparitions city of Fátima, Portugal, in 1998, where he has published extensively about the Shrine (the Sanctuary of Our Lady of Fátima), about Blessed Alexandrina of Balazar and other Catholic-oriented works.

== Bibliography ==
=== Non Fiction ===
Madigan has written short articles for The Seafarer, Blackwood's Magazine, Fairplay International Shipping Weekly and Catholic Life in the UK, Soul in the US and many English language publications in Portugal. His full-length works are:

- Random Jottings for Young Seafarers. 1978. Marine Society
- Safe or Sorry. 1980. Marine Society
- The Devil is a Jackass. 1996. Gracewing. (UK). ISBN 0-85244-251-3
- The Catholic Quiz Book. 1996. Gracewing. (UK). ISBN 972-99941-0-2
- The Fatima Handbook. 2000. Gracewing. (UK). ISBN 0-85244-532-6
- What Happened at Fatima. 2000. CTS. (UK). ISBN 1-86082-091-3; Fatima-Ophel. 2000. (Portugal). ISBN 186-08209-1-3
- Princesses of the Kingdom. 2001. Kolbe. (Cork, Ireland). ISBN 0-9529627-4-8; 2003. Fatima-Ophel. (Portugal). ISBN 972-95882-3-6
- The Children of Fatima. 2003. Our Sunday Visitor. (USA). ISBN 1-931709-57-2
- Why Fátima? 2004. Fatima-Ophel. (Portugal). ISBN 972-95882-7-9
- Armchair Fátima. 2005. Fatima-Ophel. (Portugal). ISBN 972-99305-1-1
- Alexandrina da Costa. 2005. Fatima-Ophel. (Portugal). ISBN 972-95882-9-5
- The 2nd Catholic Quiz Book. 2006. Fatima-Ophel. (Portugal). ISBN 972-99941-0-2
- The Fatima Guide. 2007. Fatima-Ophel. (Portugal). ISBN 978-972-99941-3-5
- The Irish Monstrance. 2009. Fatima-Ophel. (Portugal). ISBN 978-972-99941-4-2
- Exquisite Miniature. 2011. Fatima-Ophel. (Portugal). ISBN 978-972-99941-6-6
- The Golden Book of Fatima. 2013. Fatima-Ophel. (Portugal). ISBN 978-989-8564-03-0
- The Fatima Prayer Book. 2014 (9th printing). Fatima-Ophel. (Portugal). ISBN 978-972-99941-7-3

=== Fiction ===
In addition to short stories appearing in The Seafarer and East End Magazine in the UK and The Algarve Magazine in Portugal, Madigan has written the following full length fictional works:

- Jackarandy. 1972. Elek. (UK), Quartet, 1974, ISBN 978-0-236-15442-5
- The Bank of Infinite Reserves. 1987. Fatima-Ophel. (Portugal). ISBN 978-1-84024-032-0
- The Weka-Feather Cloak. Bethlehem Books. (USA) 2002. ISBN 978-1-883937-68-3
- Who Told You You Were Naked? Fatima-Orphel. (Portugal) 2008. ISBN 978-972-8981-07-5
- Crystal Ball Cameos Fatima Books. 2014. ISBN 978-989-8564-10-8

== Prizes and awards ==
- Jackarandy
  - Arts Council Award 1974
- The Will of Quintus Kirkwood
  - 2nd prize Yeovil Short Story Competition 2010
  - shortlisted for Fountane Book Publishing 2010 competition
  - 1st prize Dream Quest Writing Competition, Chicago, Il. USA 2010
  - (as Where There's a Will), 1st prize Moyama Competition 2010; Published in Moyama Annual Review 2011
  - (as Where There's a Will), 2nd place Calderdale Short Story Competition 2011
- Those Gorgeous Ghosts (as Brighter Than New Coins)
  - 1st prize Chudleigh Phoenix 2012 Short Story Competition
- The Bogus Confession
  - (as The Old Man From the Garden), Ashby de la Zouch Writers' Club 2010; 3rd place
  - 3rd prize, Deddington Writing Competition 2011
- The Seduction of Fausto Batista
  - shortlisted, New Writer prose prize 2010. 2nd place
- The Kambala Buffaloes
  - University of Plymouth Press Short Story Competition 2011
  - Eric Hoffer Awards finalist; published in Best New Writing 2013, Hopewell Publication, New Jersey, USA
  - 2nd place William van Dyke Short Story Prize 2011
  - 1st runner-up Colonnade Writing Contest 2011
- The Protest of Able
  - Highly Commended in The New Writer 2011 Prose & Poetry Prizes, Cranbrook UK
- The Siberian Swimmer
  - Runner-up for The Fulton Prize, Adirondack Review 2011
- The Other Two
  - 1st prize, The Write Helper Story Contest 2011
