= Communion and the developmentally disabled =

Christian rite

Holy Communion, also known as the Eucharist and the Lord's Supper, is a Christian rite that is considered a sacrament in most churches. The accessibility of the Eucharist (receiving sacramental bread and wine) to intellectually disabled Christians varies depending on the Christian denomination or community.

Some Christian traditions maintain that a theological understanding of the sacrament is necessary to receive Eucharist and, therefore, do not administer the sacrament to intellectually disabled persons. Other Christian traditions maintain that spiritual devotion to the real presence of Jesus Christ is necessary to receive the Eucharist and, therefore, administer the sacrament to intellectually disabled persons under particular conditions - presuming the benefit of the sacrament can be received even if the Eucharist is not consumed. Still other Christian traditions understand the practice of Eucharist principally as a communal expression of community solidarity or unity and, therefore, administer the sacrament indiscriminately during the liturgy.

== Roman Catholicism ==
Thomas Aquinas maintained that all cognitively impaired Christians have a right to the Eucharist and that the sacrament should not be withheld from such persons, except in the most extreme of circumstances (STh III.80.9). According to Aquinas, the only extreme circumstance that warrants withholding the Eucharist from a cognitively impaired Christian is if the Christian is entirely incapable of expressing their desire to receive the Eucharist.

The Code of Canon Law of the Roman Catholic Church has official policy about how the sacraments should be administered in the case of adult Christians who lack the use of reason. The rationale was developed on the understanding that persons who lack the use of reason, like infants, need the assistance of others to participate in the sacraments of the Church. Thus, ecclesial care for infants provides the principles for the ecclesial care of intellectually disabled persons.

Regarding the administration of Eucharist to children and other persons who lack the use of reason, Canon 913 states

"§1. The administration of the Most Holy Eucharist to children requires that they have sufficient knowledge and careful preparation so that they understand the mystery of Christ according to their capacity and are able to receive the body of Christ with faith and devotion."
"§2. The Most Holy Eucharist, however, can be administered to children in danger of death if they can distinguish the body of Christ from ordinary food and receive communion reverently."

This policy is reflected in the positions published by many Roman Catholic dioceses in the United States and Australia.

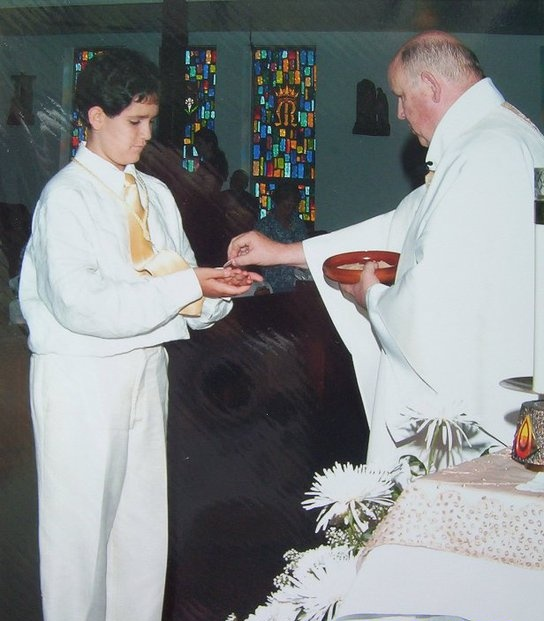
First Communion of a mentally delayed boy in a Catholic church located in Miami

Additionally, the United States Conference of Catholic Bishops stated in its Guidelines for the Celebration of the Sacraments with Persons with Disabilities (approved 1995):

the criterion for reception of holy communion is the same for persons with developmental and mental disabilities as for all persons, namely, that the person be able to distinguish the Body of Christ from ordinary food, even if this recognition is evidenced through manner, gesture, or reverential silence rather than verbally. Pastors are encouraged to consult with parents, those who take the place of parents, diocesan personnel involved with disability issues, psychologists, religious educators, and other experts in making their judgment. If it is determined that a parishioner who is disabled is not ready to receive the sacrament, great care is to be taken in explaining the reasons for this decision. Cases of doubt should be resolved in favor of the right of the baptized person to receive the sacrament. The existence of a disability is not considered in and of itself as disqualifying a person from receiving the eucharist.

In an effort to better reach marginalized populations, such as those living with autism and other developmental disabilities, while at the same time providing for their religious education, organizations have emerged offering online alternatives to traditional Faith Formation in keeping with the USCCB's Guidelines.

== Eastern Catholic Church and Eastern Lutheran Churches ==
Eastern Catholic Churches and Eastern Lutheran Churches, which practice infant communion, favor intellectually disabled Christians being allowed to receive the Eucharist.

== Orthodox Christianity ==
Orthodox Christianity makes communion available to all baptized and chrismated church members who wish to receive it, regardless of developmental or other disabilities. The theory is that the soul of the recipient understands what is being received even if the conscious mind is incapable of doing so, and that the grace imparted by Communion "for the healing of soul and body" is a benefit that most especially should not be denied in such cases. This is consistent with the practice of Infant Communion in Eastern Orthodoxy.

Orthodox Christians typically receive the Sacrament of Confession before receiving the Eucharist. However, for those who are either mentally incapable of recognizing or recalling their sins, or who are mentally or physically incapable of communicating their sins to a priest, this requirement is dispensed with, just as it is for very young children.

== Protestantism ==
Among Churches within the Protestant branch of Christianity, each denomination will have their own policy of working with people who have an intellectual impairment.

=== Evangelical-Lutheranism ===
In the Evangelical-Lutheran Churches, the sacrament of Holy Communion is administered to people with intellectual disability, as with people with dementia.

=== Anglican ===
While the Anglican Church (also known as the Episcopalian Church) welcomes all people, it does not have a firm policy for giving communion to people with learning difficulties. However, most Anglican churches hold an "open table", meaning that all baptised Christians are welcome to receive communion.

=== Presbyterianism ===
The Church of Scotland says in regard to those with learning difficulties:

"there is nothing in the law of the Church which would automatically disqualify a person with learning difficulties from admission to the Lord's Table and from having his or her name added to the Communion Roll of a congregation."

== Nondenominational Christianity ==
In most evangelical Christian churches, the only requirement for any individual to participate in Communion is that the person professes to have a personal relationship with God and to have accepted Jesus Christ as their Savior. Before Communion in these churches, the policy is usually verbally outlined and the decision is left up to the individual.

== See also ==
- Eucharistic discipline
