= Filippo Giustini =

Italian cardinal

His Eminence Filippo Giustini
- Prefect of the Congregation for the Sacraments
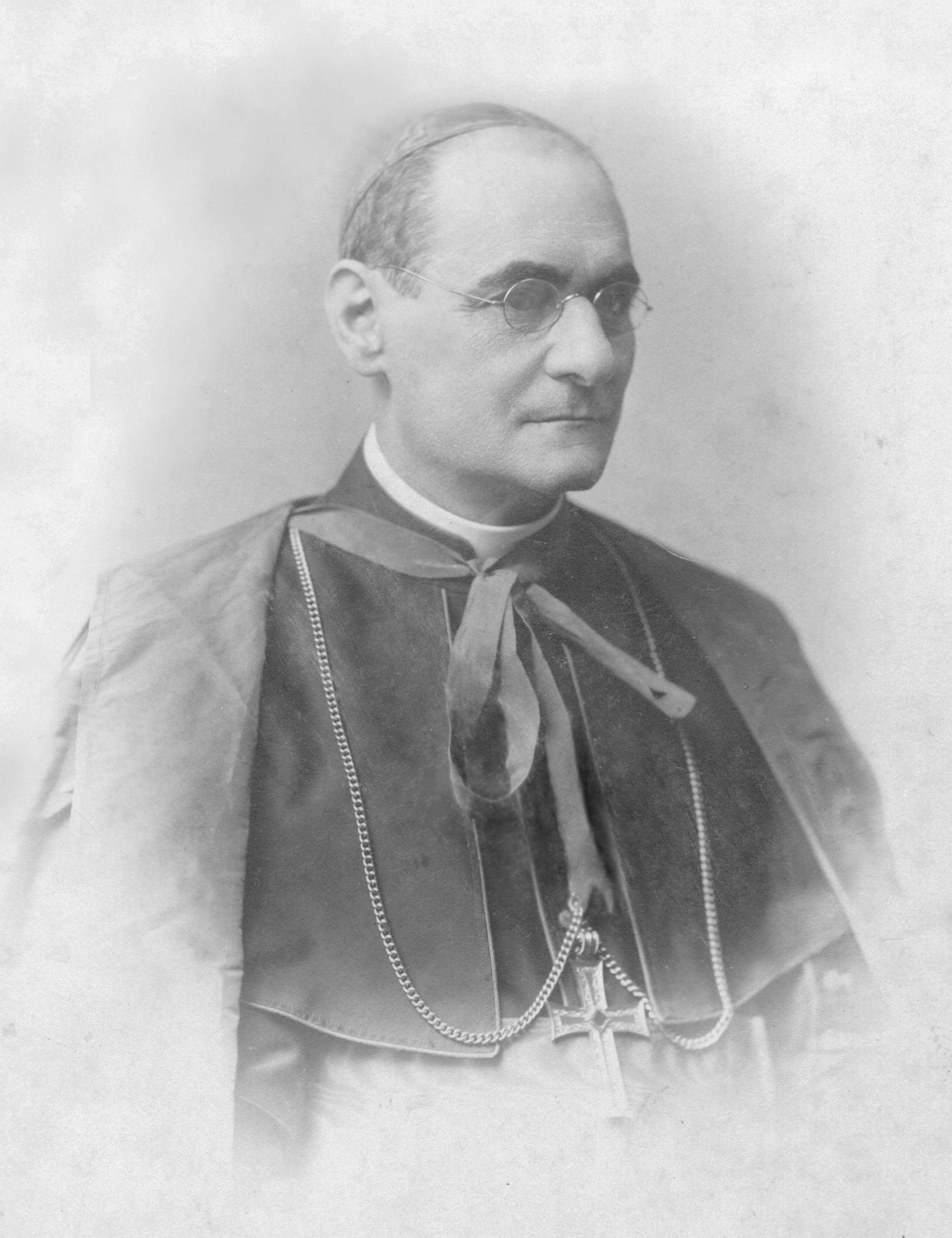
- Church: Roman Catholic Church
- Appointed: 14 October 1914
- Term ended: 18 March 1920
- Predecessor: Domenico Ferrata
- Successor: Michele Lega
- Other post: Cardinal-Deacon of Sant'Angelo in Pescheria (1914-20)
- Previous post: Secretary of the Congregation for the Sacraments (1908-14)

Orders
- Ordination: 23 December 1876 by Carlo Gigli
- Created cardinal: 25 May 1914 by Pope Pius X
- Rank: Cardinal-Deacon

Personal details
- Born: Filippo Giustini; 8 May 1852 Cineto Romano, Papal States
- Died: 18 March 1920 (aged 67) Rome, Kingdom of Italy
- Buried: Campo Verano
- Parents: Andrea Giustini; Dorotea Caponetti
- Education: Pontifical Roman Athenaeum Saint Apollinare
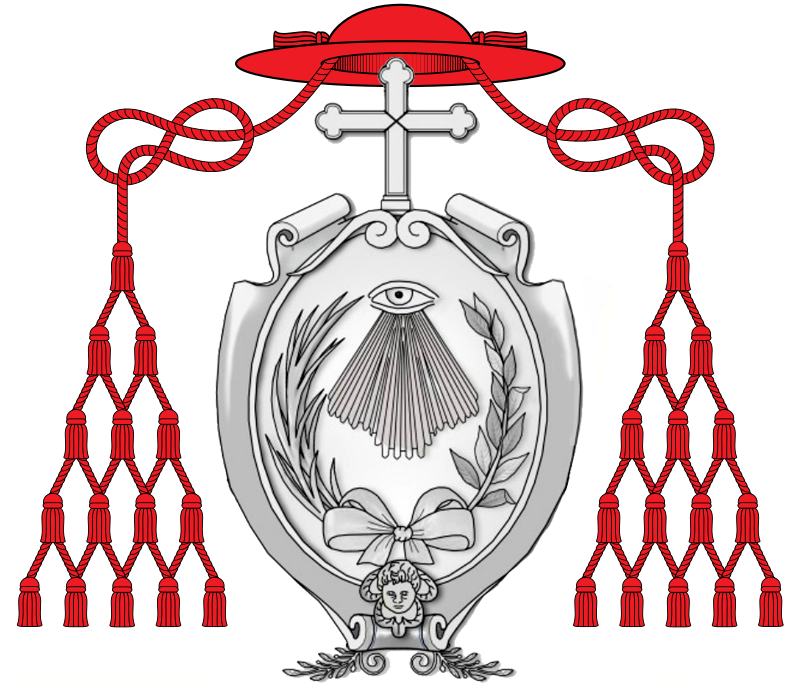
- Coat of arms

Styles of Filippo Giustini
- Reference style: His Eminence
- Spoken style: Your Eminence
- Informal style: Cardinal
- See: none

Filippo Giustini (8 May 1852 – 18 March 1920) was an Italian Cardinal of the Roman Catholic Church. He served as Prefect of the Congregation for the Discipline of the Sacraments from 1914 until his death, and was elevated to the cardinalate in 1914.

== Biography ==
Filippo Giustini was born in Cineto Romano. He studied at the seminaries of Subiaco, next to the Benedictine monastery, and of Tivoli. He entered the Pontifical Pio Seminary in Rome in November 1871. Giustini was ordained to the priesthood on 23 December 1876, and then taught at the Tivoli seminary until 1878.

From 1878 to 1896, he was Professor of Roman Law at the Pontifical Roman Athenaeum "S. Apollinare", from where he obtained his doctorate as well in 1880. Giustini was named Prefect of Studies at the Athenaeum on 26 February 1878, a Privy Chamberlain of His Holiness on 11 December 1886 and a canon of Santa Maria in Trastevere on 21 May 1891.

On 22 June 1892, he entered the service of the Roman Curia, as counselor of the Sacred Congregation for the Propagation of the Faith. He was made a Domestic Prelate of His Holiness on 18 August 1896, auditor of the Roman Rota on 11 February 1897 and later a judge of the Vatican Tribunal of First Instance. After becoming Secretary of the Sacred Congregation for Bishops and Regulars on 28 April 1902, he was made counselor of the Supreme Sacred Congregation of the Holy Office on the following 27 August.

On 24 October 1908, Giustini was appointed Secretary of the Sacred Congregation for the Discipline of the Sacraments by Pope Pius X. As Secretary, he served as the second-highest official of that dicastery under Cardinal Domenico Ferrata. Pope Pius then created him Cardinal-Deacon of Sant'Angelo in Pescheria in the consistory of 25 May 1914.

Giustini was one of the cardinal electors who participated in the 1914 papal conclave, which selected Pope Benedict XV, who named him Prefect of the Discipline of the Sacraments on 14 October that year. He also served as a member of the Commission for the Authentic Interpretation of the Code of Canon Law, and as Protector of the Order of the Friars Minor, more commonly known as the Franciscans. In 1919, Giustini served as papal legate to the centennial celebration of St. Stephen of Hungary in Capua, and to the Holy Land for the celebration of the seventh centennial of St. Francis of Assisi’s visit to Egypt and Palestine.

Cardinal Giustini died from pulmonary disease at 11:20 a.m., in his Roman residence. After an exposition and funeral Mass at the church of Santa Maria Nuova, he was buried in the crypt of the Sacred Congregation of Propaganda Fide at the Campo Verano cemetery.

Catholic Church titles
Preceded by Domenico Ferrata	Prefect of the Congregation for the Discipline of the Sacraments; 1914–1920	Succeeded by Michele Lega
