= Quod apostolici muneris =

Papal encyclical by Pope Leo XIII

Quod apostolici muneris Latin for 'Of our apostolic office' Encyclical of Pope Leo XIII
- Signature date: 28 December 1878
- Subject: On Socialism
- Number: 2 of 85 of the pontificate
- Text: In Latin; In English

Quod apostolici muneris is the second encyclical of Pope Leo XIII. It was published on 28 December 1878.

== Contents ==
The encyclical opposes "socialism, communism and nihilism", regarded as three aspects of a single ideology that is opposed to moral values, natural institutions and the principles of authority and property. This is contrasted with the Church's own social theory which respects social distinctions while stressing the importance of helping the poor. This was not a new battle for the Pope. He was continuing the war which had been waged for years against these enemies of the Catholic Faith beginning with Pope Clement XII (1730-1740).

The form of socialism that the encyclical opposes is one whose proponents "strive to seize and hold in common whatever has been acquired either by title of lawful inheritance, or by labour of brain and hands, or by thrift in one's mode of life". To this is opposed the Church's teaching that "the right of property and of ownership, which springs from nature itself, must not be touched and stands inviolate. For she knows that stealing and robbery were forbidden in so special a manner by God, the Author and Defender of right, that He would not allow man even to desire what belonged to another, and that thieves and despoilers, no less than adulterers and idolaters, are shut out from the Kingdom of Heaven".

In “Quod Apostolici Muneris”, Leo condemned the Socialists' attack on marriage and property, two topics he will devote entire encyclicals to later in his pontificate (Arcanum in 1880 and Rerum novarum in 1891).

== See also ==
- List of encyclicals of Pope Leo XIII
