= Mirae caritatis =

Papal encyclical by Pope Leo XIII

Mirae caritatis Latin for 'Mirror of Charity' Encyclical of Pope Leo XIII
- Signature date: 28 May 1902
- Subject: On the Holy Eucharist
- Number: 82 of 85 of the pontificate
- Text: In English

Mirae caritatis is an encyclical of Pope Leo XIII on the Holy Eucharist given on 28 May 1902. Its theme is mainly the marvelous effects of devotion to the Holy Eucharist in the moral and spiritual life of the faithful.

The Pope explores several aspects of eucharistic theology, citing the Eucharist as the source of life, a mystery of faith, a bond of charity, and the sacrifice of the Mass.

"For as men and states alike necessarily have their being from God, so they can do nothing good except in God through Jesus Christ, through whom every best and choicest gift has ever proceeded and proceeds." ...whereas God has subordinated the whole supernatural order to the Incarnation of His Word, in virtue whereof salvation has been restored to the human race, ... the Eucharist, according to the testimony of the holy Fathers, should be regarded as in a manner a continuation and extension of the Incarnation.

As in previous encyclicals, Leo continues his call for social renewal, which source is found in the Holy Eucharist. He maintains that the sacrament fosters mutual charity that will promote Christian brotherhood and social equality.

Having extolled the many benefits of the Eucharist, Leo then encourages frequent reception of same, a matter that was the subject of some debate at the time.

Away then with the widespread but most mischievous error of those who give it as their opinion that the reception of the Eucharist is in a manner reserved for those ... who rid themselves of the cares of the world in order to find rest in some kind of professedly religious life. For this gift, than which nothing can be more excellent or more conducive to salvation, is offered to all those, whatever their office or dignity may be, ...."

Leo's successor, Pope Pius X, reiterated this in his 1905 motu proprio Sacra Tridentina Synodus, and the 1910 Quam singulari, which established the "age of reason" (about seven years of age) as the threshold for children to be admitted to the sacrament.

The expression mirror of charity itself was popularized by Ailred of Rievaulx during the Middle Ages. Leo XIII's encyclical was cited by Popes Pius XII and Paul VI in their own teaching documents, respectively Mediator Dei and Mysterium fidei.

== See also ==
- List of encyclicals of Pope Leo XIII

== Sources ==
- Pope Leo XIII (May 28, 1902), Mirae caritatis, Libreria Editrice Vaticana
