= Quam singulari =

Papal decree concerning the admittance of children to the Eucharist

Quam singulari was a decree released by Pope Pius X in 1910, concerning the admittance of children to the Eucharist. This followed a decree by the Sacred Congregation of the Council, five years before on frequent Communion.

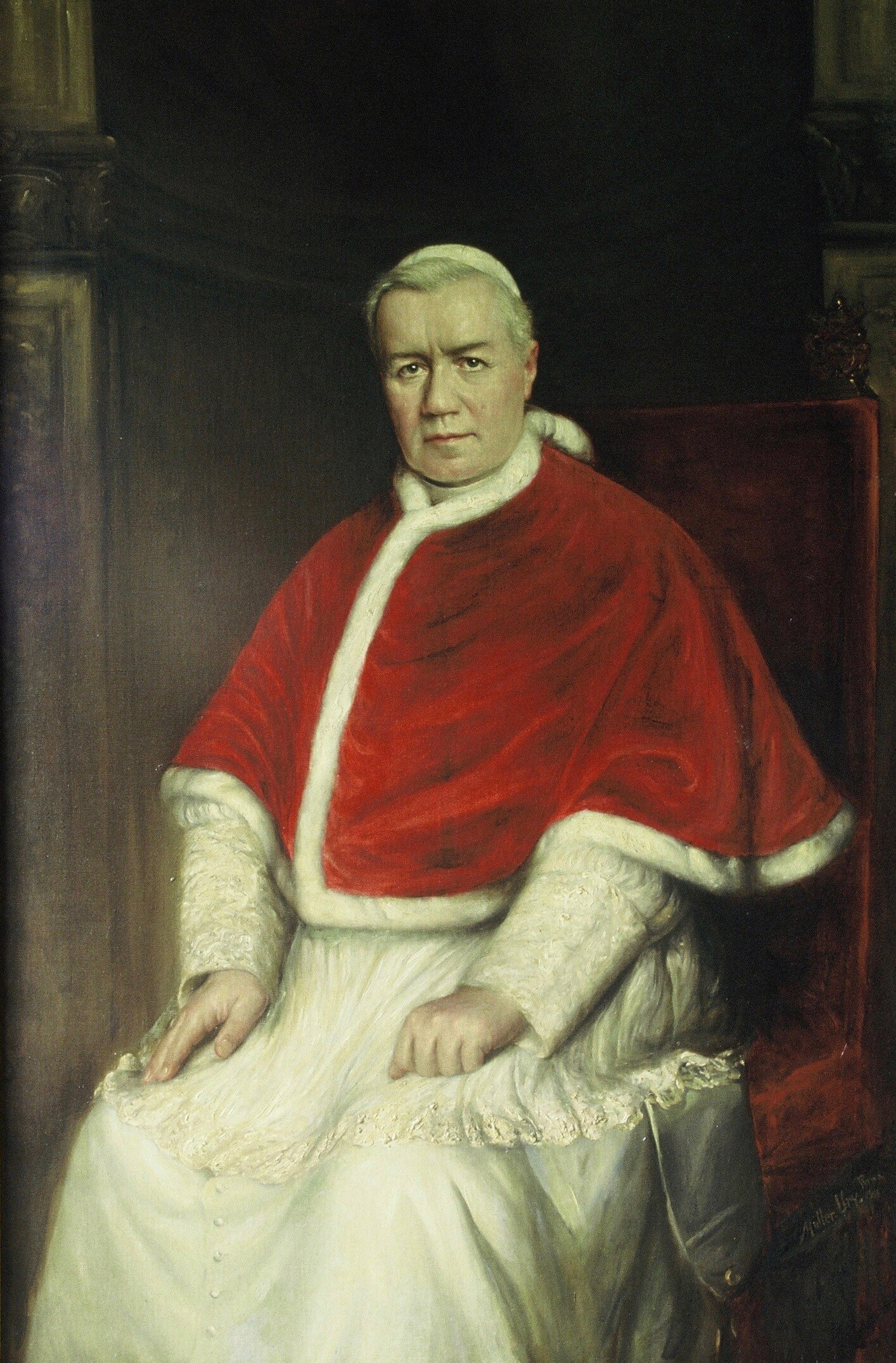
Pope Pius X

== Background ==
There was a concern in the church about the practice of operating with different ages for admitting first Communion and first Confession. Certain doctrinal and ascetical errors had developed at the beginning of the century, at least in some parts of the world. These, like other errors, were rooted in Jansenism. Some argued that, while reaching the age of reason was enough to receive first Confession, "a full knowledge of matters of faith" was needed to receive the first Communion.

This, according to the Quam singulari, was in error. In evidence of this, the decree referred to historical authorities such as the teachings of St. Thomas Aquinas and St. Antoninus, the practices of the early church and Christ's own sayings on children. It was therefore stressed that this decree did not institute a new doctrine, but simply clarified ancient ones.

Cardinal Domenico Ferrata, former prefect of the Sacred Congregation of Rites, played an important part in the preparation of Quam singulari.

== Content ==
The decree begins by noting Jesus' love for children:

"The pages of the Gospel show clearly how special was that love for children which Christ showed while He was on earth. It was His delight to be in their midst; He was wont to lay His hands on them; He embraced them; and He blessed them. At the same time He was not pleased when they would be driven away by the disciples, whom He rebuked gravely with these words: “Let the little children come to me, and do not hinder them, for of such is the kingdom of God.”

Pius noted that the custom of giving Holy Communion to infants immediately after baptism, and frequently before the beginning of their rational life was practiced up until the thirteenth century, and while modified, never condemned; it is even approved among the Eastern rites.

Another error was the pretense that "the Holy Eucharist is a reward (for virtue), not a remedy for human frailty," a concept that contradicts the teaching of the Council of Trent that Holy Communion is "an antidote by which we are freed from our daily faults and preserved from mortal sins". Pius X believed that children should be able to receive absolution and holy communion to strengthen and protect against the dangers and challenges of the modern world.

The decree of the Lateran Council (1215, can. xxi) has never been revoked or modified, and in virtue of it all are obliged, as soon as they arrive at the years of discretion, to receive both the Sacraments of Penance and Holy Communion at Easter time

It was decreed that:

- "The age of discretion, both for Confession and for Holy Communion, is the time when a child begins to reason, that is about the seventh year, more or less."
- "A full and perfect knowledge of Christian doctrine is not necessary either for First Confession or for First Communion."
- It was also stressed that those who had charge of the children, both parents and pastors, should see to it both that the children received their first Communion, and that they continued to do this at least once a year afterwards.

== Implementation ==
At the regular meeting of the bishops of England and Wales in November 1910, the bishops decided that the decree should be publicly read each Easter. The following year, they developed a course for the gradual instruction for first communion to be incorporated in subsequent diocesan syllabuses for religious education.

In May 1973, the Sacred Congregation for the Discipline of the Sacraments and the Sacred Congregation for the Clergy, issued a joint declaration, Sanctus Pontifex, discussing first reconciliation prior to first eucharist. After the Second Vatican Council a short period of experimentation allowed for a later age for First Confession. The declaration clarified that after conferring with bishops, such experiments should cease and that the accepted norm was First Confession before First Communion.

The decree Quam singulari is memorialized in a stained-glass window of Pope St. Pius X at St. Pius Church in Redwood City, California.
