= Dicastery for Divine Worship and the Discipline of the Sacraments =

Department of the Roman Curia

- Latin: Dicasterium de Cultu Divino et Disciplina Sacramentorum; Italian: Dicastero per il Culto Divino e la Disciplina dei Sacramenti
- Coat of arms of the Holy See

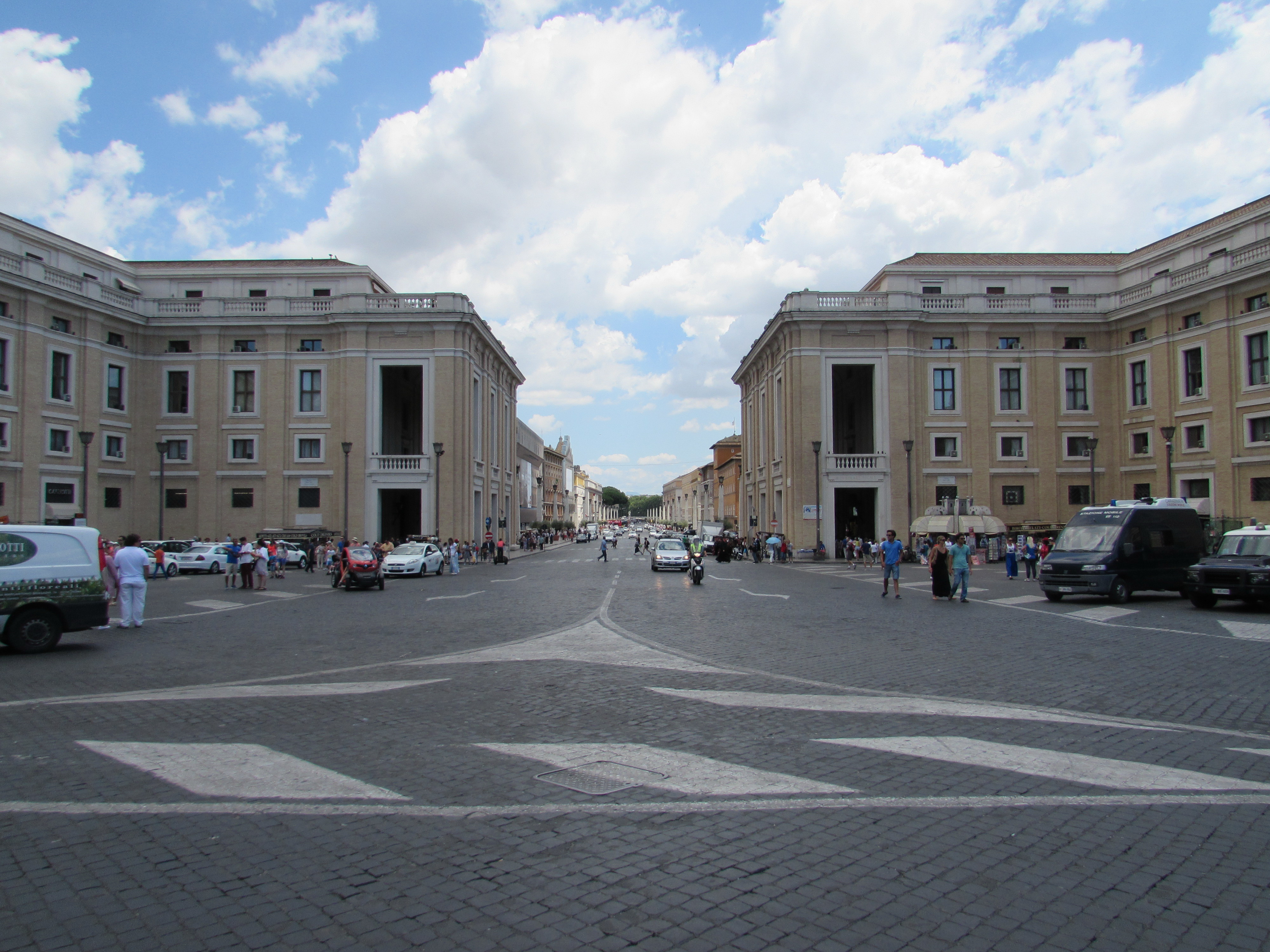
- The twin Palazzi delle Congregazioni facing one another in Piazza Pio XII (in front of St. Peter's Square) house a number of departments of the Roman Curia.

Dicastery overview
- Formed: March 1, 1989; 37 years ago (as a Congregation with the same name)
- Preceding agencies: Sacred Congregation for Divine Worship (formed May 8, 1969; 57 years ago); Sacred Congregation for the Discipline of the Sacraments (formed June 29, 1908; 118 years ago); Sacred Congregation of Rites (formed January 22, 1588; 438 years ago)
- Type: Dicastery
- Headquarters: Palazzo delle Congregazioni, Piazza Pio XII, Rome, Italy
- Dicastery executives: Arthur Roche, Prefect; Vacant, Secretary; Aurelio García Macías, Under-Secretary
- Website: www.cultodivino.va

The Dicastery for Divine Worship and the Discipline of the Sacraments (Latin: Dicasterium de Cultu Divino et Disciplina Sacramentorum) is the dicastery of the Roman Curia that handles most affairs relating to liturgical practices of the Latin Church as distinct from the Eastern Catholic Churches and also some technical matters relating to the sacraments.

Prior to June 2022, the dicastery was officially named the Congregation for Divine Worship and the Discipline of the Sacraments (only the first word being different), erected in 1969 after the division of the Sacred Congregation of Rites. This former name has often been shortened to Congregation for Divine Worship, further abbreviated as Divine Worship or CDW.

== List of accorded responsibilities ==
The Apostolic Constitution Pastor bonus, issued by Pope John Paul II on 28 June 1988, established the congregation's functions:

- Regulation and promotion of the liturgy, primarily of the sacraments
- Regulation of the administration of the sacraments, especially regarding their valid and licit celebration
- Promoting liturgical pastoral activity, especially regarding the celebration of the Eucharist
- Drawing up and revision of liturgical texts
- Reviewing particular calendars and proper texts for the Mass and the Divine Office
- Granting the recognitio to translations of liturgical books and their adaptations
- Promoting the liturgical apostolate or sacred music, song or art
- Ensuring that liturgical norms are accurately observed, and that abuses are avoided and eliminated where they are found to exist.
- Examining the fact of non-consummation in a marriage and the existence of a just cause for granting a dispensation.
- Examining cases concerning the nullity of ordination.
- Regulating the cult of relics, the confirmation of heavenly patrons in a diocese or locality
- The valid authorisation of canonical coronations for venerated Catholic images decreed from a Pope
- The elevation of sanctuaries to the title of minor basilica.
- Giving assistance to bishops so that the prayers and pious exercises of the Christian people may be fostered and held in high esteem.

On 30 August 2011, Pope Benedict XVI transferred jurisdiction over unconsummated marriages and the nullification of ordinations to the Roman Rota to relieve the congregation of administrative burdens and allow it to focus on liturgy, its principal responsibility. In 2012, the congregation added an office devoted to liturgical architecture and music.

From 2001 to 2017, the congregation had primary authority over a nation's liturgical translations. On 9 September 2017, Pope Francis weakened the congregation's authority with his motu proprio titled Magnum principium, ensuring that, starting 1 October 2017, the nation's Conference of Bishops will manage local liturgical translations. On 22 October 2017, the Vatican released a letter that Pope Francis had sent to the Prefect of the Congregation for Divine Worship and the Discipline of the Sacrament, Cardinal Robert Sarah, clarifying that the Vatican and its departments would have limited authority to confirm liturgical translations recognized by a local Conference of Bishops, thus retracting a commentary which Sarah had published on 13 October 2017.

In March 2021, following Sarah's retirement, Pope Francis charged Claudio Maniago, leader of the Italian Episcopal Conference's liturgy programs, with undertaking a canonical visitation of the Congregation of Divine Worship in anticipation of the appointment of a new prefect. Francis then named Arthur Roche prefect on 27 May 2021.

== History of related dicasteries ==
Establishment of status quo		Years in effect	Dicasteries by competency		
Pope	Decree	Years in effect	Sacraments	Liturgy	Canonizations of saints
Pope Sixtus V	Immensa aeterni Dei	1588–1908	Sacred Congregation of Rites (Sacra Rituum Congregatio)		
Pope Pius X	Sapienti consilio	1908–1969	Sacred Congregation for the Discipline of the Sacraments (Sacra Congregatio de Disciplina Sacramentorum)	Sacred Congregation of Holy Rites (Sacra Congregatio sacrorum Rituum)	
Pope Paul VI	Sacra Rituum Congregatio	1969–1975	Sacred Congregation for the Discipline of the Sacraments (Sacra Congregatio de Disciplina Sacramentorum)	Sacred Congregation for Divine Worship (Sacra Congregatio pro Cultu Divino)	Sacred Congregation for the Causes of Saints (Sacra Congregatio pro Causis Sanctorum)
Pope Paul VI	Constans nobis	1975–1984	Sacred Congregation for Sacraments and Divine Worship (Sacra Congregatio pro Sacramentis Divinoque Cultu, later Sacra Congregatio pro Sacramentis et Cultu Divino)		Sacred Congregation for the Causes of Saints (Sacra Congregatio pro Causis Sanctorum)
Pope John Paul II	Quoniam in celeri	1984–1989	Sacred Congregation for Sacraments (Sacra Congregatio pro Sacramentis)	Sacred Congregation for Divine Worship (Sacra Congregatio pro Cultu Divino)	Sacred Congregation for the Causes of Saints (Sacra Congregatio pro Causis Sanctorum)
Pope John Paul II	Pastor bonus	1989–2022	Congregation for Divine Worship and the Discipline of the Sacraments (Congregatio de Cultu Divino et Disciplina Sacramentorum)		Congregation for the Causes of Saints (Congregatio de Causis Sanctorum)
Pope Francis	Praedicate evangelium	2022–present	Dicastery for Divine Worship and the Discipline of the Sacraments (Dicasterium de Cultu Divino et Disciplina Sacramentorum)		Dicastery for the Causes of Saints (Dicasterium de Causis Sanctorum)

== Cardinal Prefects ==
Prefect of the Dicastery for Divine Worship and the Discipline of the Sacraments
- Incumbent; Arthur Roche since 27 May 2021
- Member of: Roman Curia
- Appointer: The Pope
- Term length: Five years (renewable)
- Constituting instrument: Pastor bonus (1988); Praedicate evangelium (2022)
- Precursor: Prefect of the S.C. for Divine Worship; Prefect of the S.C. for Sacraments
- Inaugural holder: Eduardo Martínez Somalo
- Formation: March 1, 1989; 37 years ago (as prefecture of the Congregation with the same name)

- Domenico Ferrata (1908–1914)
- Filippo Giustini (1914–1920)
- Michele Lega (1920–1935)
- Domenico Jorio (1935–1954)
- Benedetto Aloisi Masella (1954–1968)
- Francesco Carpino (7 April 1967 – 26 June 1967)
- Francis James Brennan (1968)
- Antonio Samorè (prefect, Divine Worship, 1968–1969; prefect, Discipline of the Sacraments, 1968–1974)
- Benno Walter Gut (prefect, Divine Worship, 1969–1970)
- Arturo Tabera (prefect, Divine Worship, 1971–1973)
- James Knox (1974–1981)
- Giuseppe Casoria, (pro-prefect 1981–1983, prefect 1983–1984)
- Paul Mayer (pro-prefect 1984–1985, prefect 1985–1988)
- Eduardo Martínez Somalo (1988–1992)
- Antonio María Javierre Ortas (1992–1996)
- Jorge Medina (pro-prefect 1996–1998, prefect 1998–2002)
- Francis Arinze (2002–2008)
- Antonio Cañizares Llovera (2008–2014)
- Robert Sarah (2014–2021)
- Arthur Roche (2021–present)

== Secretary ==
- Annibale Bugnini (1969–1975)
- Lajos Kada (1984–1991)
- Geraldo Majella Agnelo (1991–1999)
- Francesco Pio Tamburrino (1999–2003)
- Domenico Sorrentino (2003–2005)
- Malcolm Ranjith (2005–2009)
- Joseph Augustine Di Noia (2009–2012)
- Arthur Roche (2012–2021)
- Vittorio Francesco Viola (2021–2026)

== Vox Clara Committee ==
In 2001, the congregation established the Vox Clara Committee, composed of senior bishops from episcopal conferences throughout the English-speaking world. It advises the congregation on English-language liturgical texts and their distribution. It meets in Rome.

== See also ==
- Magnum principium
- Musicam sacram
- Notitiae, the congregation's official journal
- Redemptionis sacramentum
