= Apostolic Dataria =

Former office of the Holy See

The Apostolic Datary (Latin: Dataria Apostolica) was one of the five Ufficii di Curia ("Offices of the Curia") in the Roman Curia of the Roman Catholic Church. It was instituted no later than the 14th century AD. Pope Paul VI abolished it in 1967.

== Origin ==
According to the De officio et jurisdictione datarii necnon de stylo Datariae of Amydenus and other authorities, the Dataria Apostolica was of very ancient origin, but the previous transaction by other offices of the business that was gradually assigned to it contradicts these authorities. The Dataria was principally entrusted with concession of matrimonial dispensations of external jurisdiction and with collation (ie, conferral) of benefices and rescripts that were reserved to the Apostolic See. To this double faculty was later added the power to grant many other indults and favors. Until the pontificate of Pope Pius IV, matrimonial dispensations were granted through the Apostolic Penitentiaria. Regarding the authority of collation of reserved benefices, it could not have been granted in ancient times because the institution of those reservations is comparatively recent: although some vestige of the reservations is found prior to the twelfth century, the custom was not frequent before Pope Innocent II, and the reservation of benefices was instituted as a general rule (De pract. et dignit., 3, 4, c. 2 (6°)) only from the pontificate of Pope Clement IV. While the office certainly existed in the fourteenth century, and as an independent one, the date of its institution is unknown.

== Constitution ==
The Dataria consisted of a cardinal as its principal who was titled the "Pro-Datary" ("Prodatarius") until Sapienti Consilio of Pope Pius X, and thereafter was titled "Datarius" ("Datary"). There was formerly as much discussion of the title of "pro-datary" as of that of "vice chancellor" of the Apostolic Chancery: some contend that the title is derived from the fact that the office dated the rescripts of the Supreme Pontiff, while others that it is derived from the right to grant (dare) the indults and rescripts for which petition was made to the Supreme Pontiff. It is certain that, on account of these faculties, the Datary enjoyed great prestige during the flourishing of the office, when he was denominated the "Oculus Papae" ("Eye of the Pope"). After the Cardinal Datary came the "Subdatary" ("Subdatarius"), a prelate of the Roman Curia who assisted the Datary and assumed almost all of the faculties of the Datary as his substitute on occasion. After the Subdatary came a number of subordinate officials who, as De Luca stated, had enigmatical and sibyllic titles, e. g. the "Prefect of the Per Obitum", "Prefect of the Concessum", "Cashier of the Componenda", and "Officer of the Missis".

== Reform ==
Pope Leo XIII reformed the organization of the Dataria to conform it to modern needs. Pope Pius X reduced its functions and re-organized it in his apostolic constitution Sapienti Consilio, which specified that the Dataria was to consist of the Cardinal Datary, the Subdatary, the Prefect and his Surrogate (Sostituto), and a limited number of officials, the Cashier who was ex officio the Distributor, the Reviser, and two scribes of Papal bulls. Sapienti Consilio retained the theological examiners to vet candidates for parishes. Among the offices abrogated was that of the Apostolic Dispatchers, who had no further reason to exist in the context of the general re-organization of the Roman Curia. They had been necessary because private persons in general could not have direct recourse to the Dataria, given that it dealt only with persons it had authorized, whereas after the reform anyone was free to have direct recourse, as with any other department of the Roman Curia.

To the Dataria, which was commissioned to grant many Papal indults and concessions, remained only the evaluation the fitness of candidates for Consistorial benefices, which were reserved to the Apostolic See; writing and dispatching the Apostolic Letters for the collation of such benefices; to dispense from conditions specifically regulating them; and to providing for the pensions or for the application of such fees as imposed by the Pope in relation to the collation of those benefices.

The procedures of the Dataria were complex and primarily regulated by a set of customs, which the officials of the Dataria zealously guarded, being generally laity laymen, and who had by such guarding instituted a species of monopoly of the faculties of the Dataria, as detrimental to the Apostolic See as it was personally profitable to them. Thus it happened that its offices often descended from father to son, while the ecclesiastical superiors of such officials were to a great extent blindly dependent upon them. Pope Leo XIII initiated a reform of this situation and his successor Pope Pius X totally rectified it.

== Abrogation ==
After the Second Vatican Council, Pope Paul VI reformed the Roman Curia by the apostolic constitution Regimini Ecclesiae Universae of 15 August 1967, which included the abrogation of the Dataria Apostolica.
