= Cardinals created by Pius XI =

Catholic appointments from 1922 to 1937

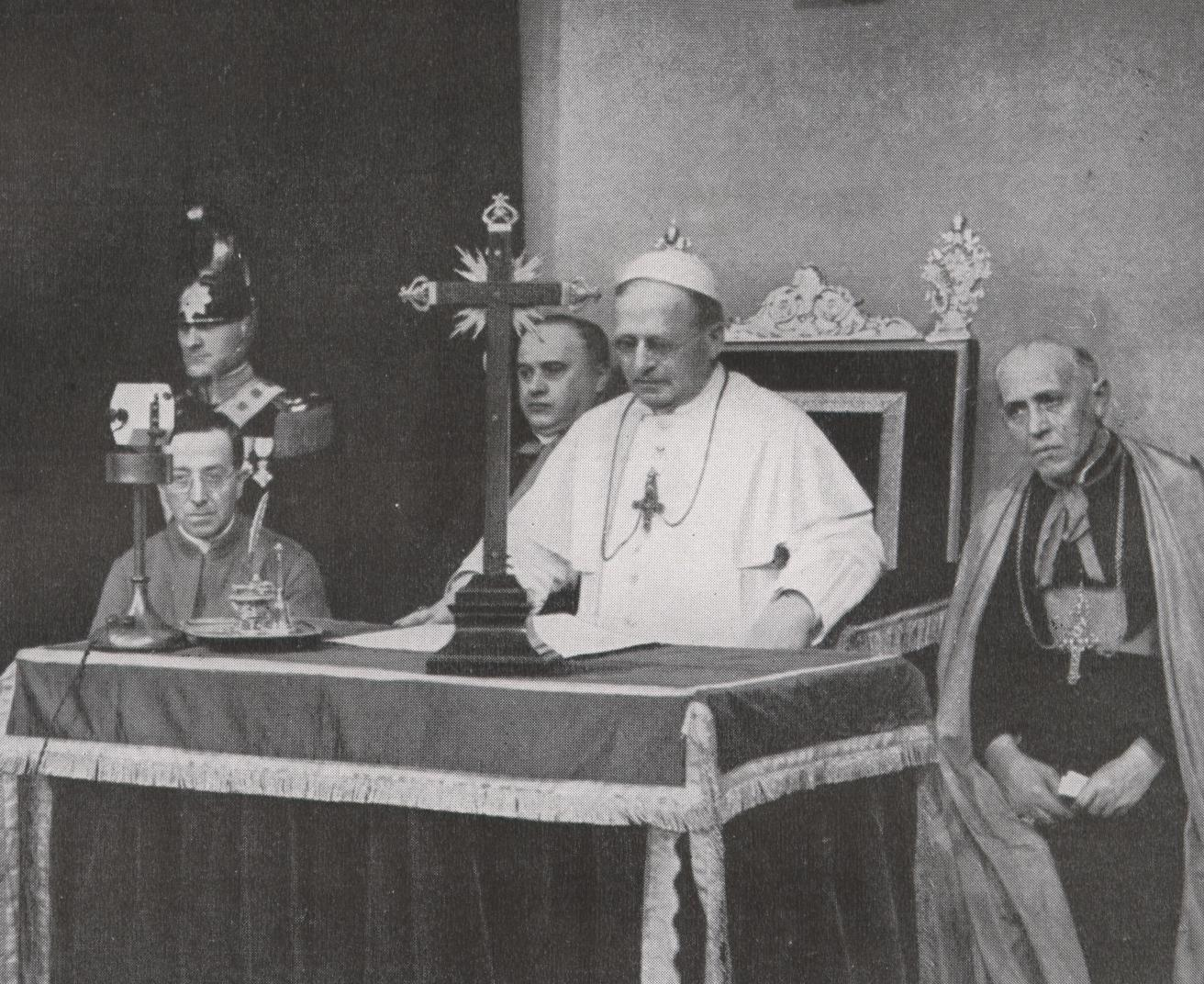
Pope Pius XI (1857–1939), photographed during the first pontifical speech on the radio in 1931.

In sixteen years, Pope Pius XI (r. 1922–1939) created 76 cardinals in 17 consistories. Though he created 18 cardinals at a consistory in 1935, he typically created very few cardinals at one time, holding small, frequent consistories, some of them less than six months apart. He held a consistory in 1929 to create just one cardinal, and created just two on eight occasions.

Of his appointments to the College of Cardinals, 43 were Italians. He appeared to strive to maintain an equilibrium between Italians and non-Italians and two of his consistories produced an equal division between the two groups, in March 1924 and December 1927. Non-Italians formed a majority of the college for several months in 1925 and again from 1928 to 1933. This balance reflected concerns about the independence of the Holy See and Italy during Benedict's papacy, and their new relationship established with the Lateran Treaty in 1929.

At its largest during his papacy, in December 1935, the college had 68 members, two short of the maximum size of 70 set by Pope Sixtus V in 1586. In 1927, he accepted a cardinal's resignation, the only one to occur in the 20th century. The cardinals he created included one future pope, Pope Pius XII.

== 11 December 1922 ==
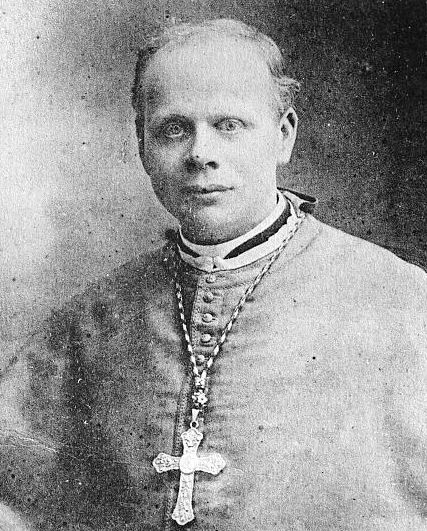
Alexis-Armand Charost (1860–1930), made a cardinal on 11 December 1922.

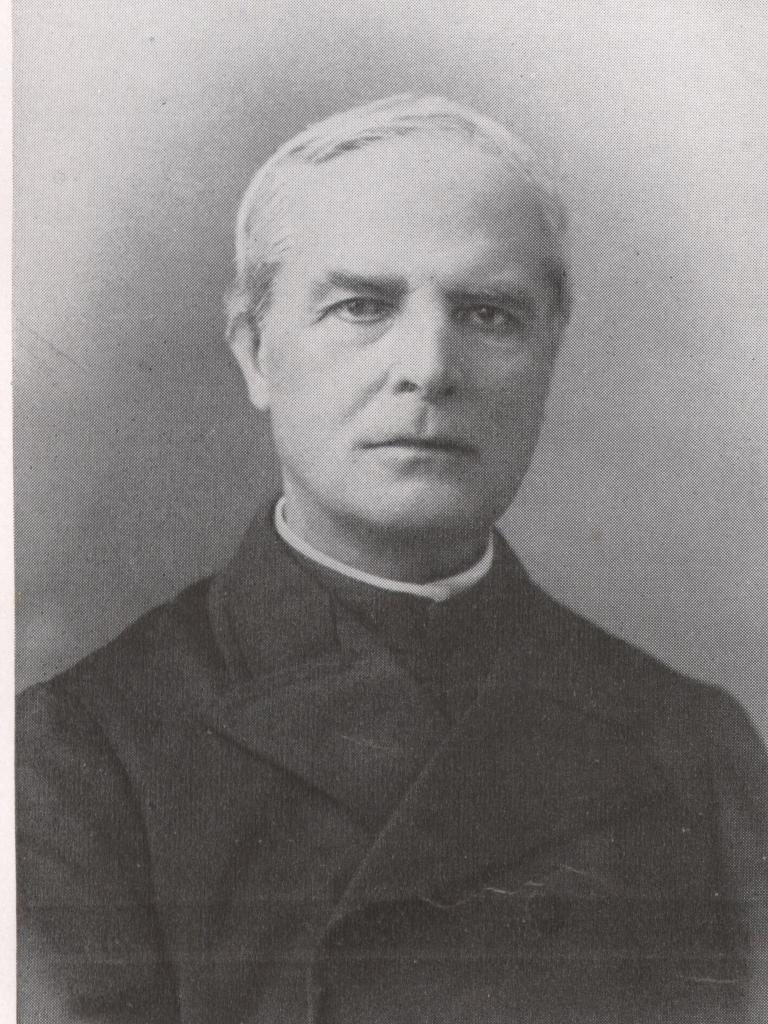
Franz Ehrle (1845–1934), made a cardinal on 11 December 1922.

Pius created eight cardinals at his first consistory, which six of them attended. Reig, Archbishop of Toledo (Note: Reig was Archbishop of Valencia when named cardinal, and was transferred to Toledo on 14 December 1922.), received his red hat from the King of Spain, and Locatelli, Papal Nuncio to Portugal, from the President of the Portuguese Republic. (Note: Reig y Casanova and Locatelli participated in the Vatican ceremony in 1923.) In the case of Reig y Casanova, a widower, Pius ignored the rule established in 1585 by Pope Sixtus V that no one who had been married could be made a cardinal. Father Ehrle, a Jesuit who had served as Vatican Archivist for several years, initially declined the honor, but relented after a private meeting with Pius.

Name	Title when named cardinal	Country
Achille Locatelli (1856–1935)	Apostolic Nuncio to Portugal	Kingdom of Italy
Giovanni Bonzano (1867–1927)	Apostolic Delegate to the United States	Kingdom of Italy
Enrique Reig y Casanova (1858–1927)	Archbishop of Valencia	(Restoration (Spain)) Kingdom of Spain
Alexis-Armand Charost (1860–1930)	Archbishop of Rennes	(French Third Republic) France
Eugenio Tosi (1864–1929)	Archbishop of Milan	Kingdom of Italy
Stanislas Touchet (1842–1926)	Bishop of Orleans	(French Third Republic) France
Giuseppe Mori (1850–1934)	Secretary of the Sacred Congregation of the Council	Kingdom of Italy
Franz Ehrle (1845–1934)	Prefect Emeritus of the Vatican Library	(Weimar Republic) Germany

== 23 May 1923 ==
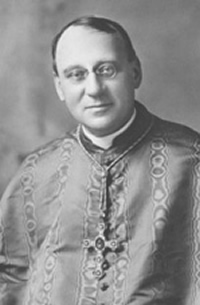
Giovanni Nasalli Rocca di Corneliano (1872–1952), made a cardinal on 23 May 1923.

Pius added two Italian cardinals on 23 May 1923.

Name	Title when named cardinal	Country
Giovanni Nasalli Rocca di Corneliano (1872–1952)	Archbishop of Bologna	Kingdom of Italy
Luigi Sincero (1870–1936)	Secretary of the College of Cardinals	Kingdom of Italy

== 20 December 1923 ==
Pius created two Italian cardinals on 20 December 1923, both longtime officials in the Roman Curia.

Name	Title when named cardinal	Country
Evaristo Lucidi (1866–1929)	Secretary of the Supreme Tribunal of the Apostolic Signatura	Kingdom of Italy
Aurelio Galli (1866–1929)	Secretary of the Secretariate of Briefs to Princes	Kingdom of Italy

== 24 March 1924 ==
Pius named a pair of American archbishops cardinals on 24 March 1924. This brought the membership of the College of Cardinals to a total of 66, 33 Italians and 33 non-Italians: seven French, seven German, four American, four Spanish, two English, two Polish, and one each of Belgian, Hungarian, Irish, Portuguese, Brazilian, Dutch, and Canadian.

Name	Title when named cardinal	Country
George Mundelein (1872–1939)	Archbishop of Chicago	United States
Patrick Joseph Hayes (1867–1938)	Archbishop of New York	United States

== 30 March 1925 ==
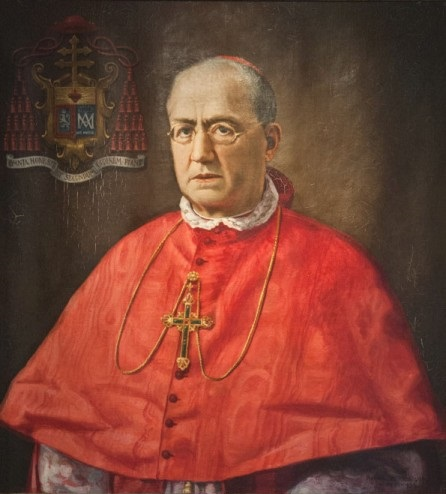
Eustaquio Ilundain y Esteban (1862–1937), made a cardinal on 30 March 1925.

Pius named a pair of Spanish archbishops cardinals on 30 March 1925. Both received their red birettas in Madrid from King Alfonso in a ceremony that included an address by the King in Latin.

The previous consistory had left the college with 33 Italians and 33 non-Italians. The deaths of the Irish Michael Logue on 19 November and the Italian Oreste Giorgi on 24 December maintained that balance. This consistory gave the non-Italians a majority of 34 to 32.

Name	Title when named cardinal	Country
Eustaquio Ilundain y Esteban (1862–1937)	Archbishop of Sevilla	(Restoration (Spain)) Kingdom of Spain
Vicente Casanova y Marzol (1854–1930)	Archbishop of Granada	(Restoration (Spain)) Kingdom of Spain

== 14 December 1925 ==
Patrick O'Donnell (1856–1927), made a cardinal on 14 December 1925.

Pius named four cardinals on 14 December 1925, three Italians (two diplomats and a curia official), and an Irish archbishop. He made an exception to the 1917 Code of Canon Law that prohibited cardinals from being closely related to one another. The new cardinal Enrico Gasparri was the nephew of Cardinal Secretary of State Pietro Gasparri.

The previous consistory had left the non-Italians with a 34 to 32 majority that had fallen by one with the death of Canadian Louis-Nazaire Bégin on 18 July 1925. This consistory restored the Italian majority once again.

Name	Title when named cardinal	Country
Bonaventura Cerretti (1872–1933)	Apostolic Nuncio to France	Kingdom of Italy
Enrico Gasparri (1871–1946)	Apostolic Nuncio to Brazil	Kingdom of Italy
Patrick O'Donnell (1856–1927)	Archbishop of Armagh	(Irish Free State) Ireland
Alessandro Verde (1865–1958)	Secretary of the Sacred Congregation of Rites	Kingdom of Italy

== 21 June 1926 ==
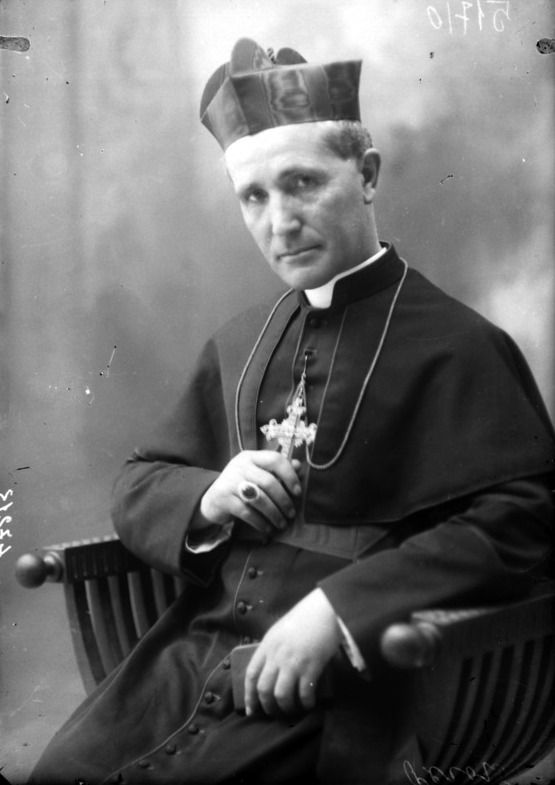
Carlo Perosi (1868–1930), made a cardinal on 21 June 1926.

Pius named two new cardinals on 21 June 1926, both Italian curia officials.

Name	Title when named cardinal	Country
Luigi Capotosti (1863–1938)	Secretary of the Sacred Congregation of the Sacraments	Kingdom of Italy
Carlo Perosi (1868–1930)	Assessor of Supreme Sacred Congregation of the Holy Office	Kingdom of Italy

== 20 December 1926 ==
On 6 December 1926, Pius announced he would create two cardinals at a consistory on 20 December. Both were Italians, one the Bishop of Turin and the other a papal nuncio.

Name	Title when named cardinal	Country
Lorenzo Lauri (1864–1941)	Apostolic Nuncio to Poland	Kingdom of Italy
Giuseppe Gamba (1857–1929)	Archbishop of Turin	Kingdom of Italy

== 20 June 1927 ==
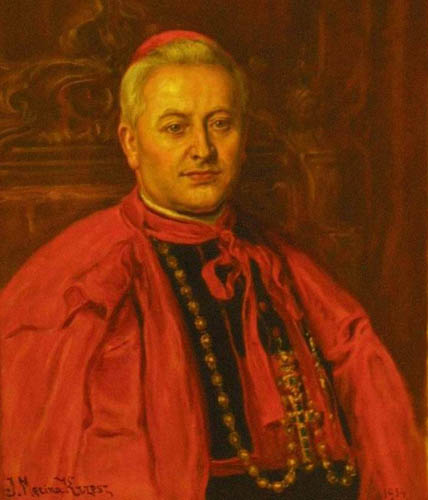
August Hlond (1881–1948), made a cardinal on 20 June 1927.

On 2 May 1927, Pius announced he would create two cardinals at a consistory on 20 June. Both were Archbishops, one Belgian and one Polish.

Name	Title when named cardinal	Country
Jozef-Ernest van Roey (1874–1961)	Archbishop of Mechelen	Belgium
August Hlond (1881–1948)	Archbishop of Poznan and Archbishop of Gniezno	Poland

== 19 December 1927 ==
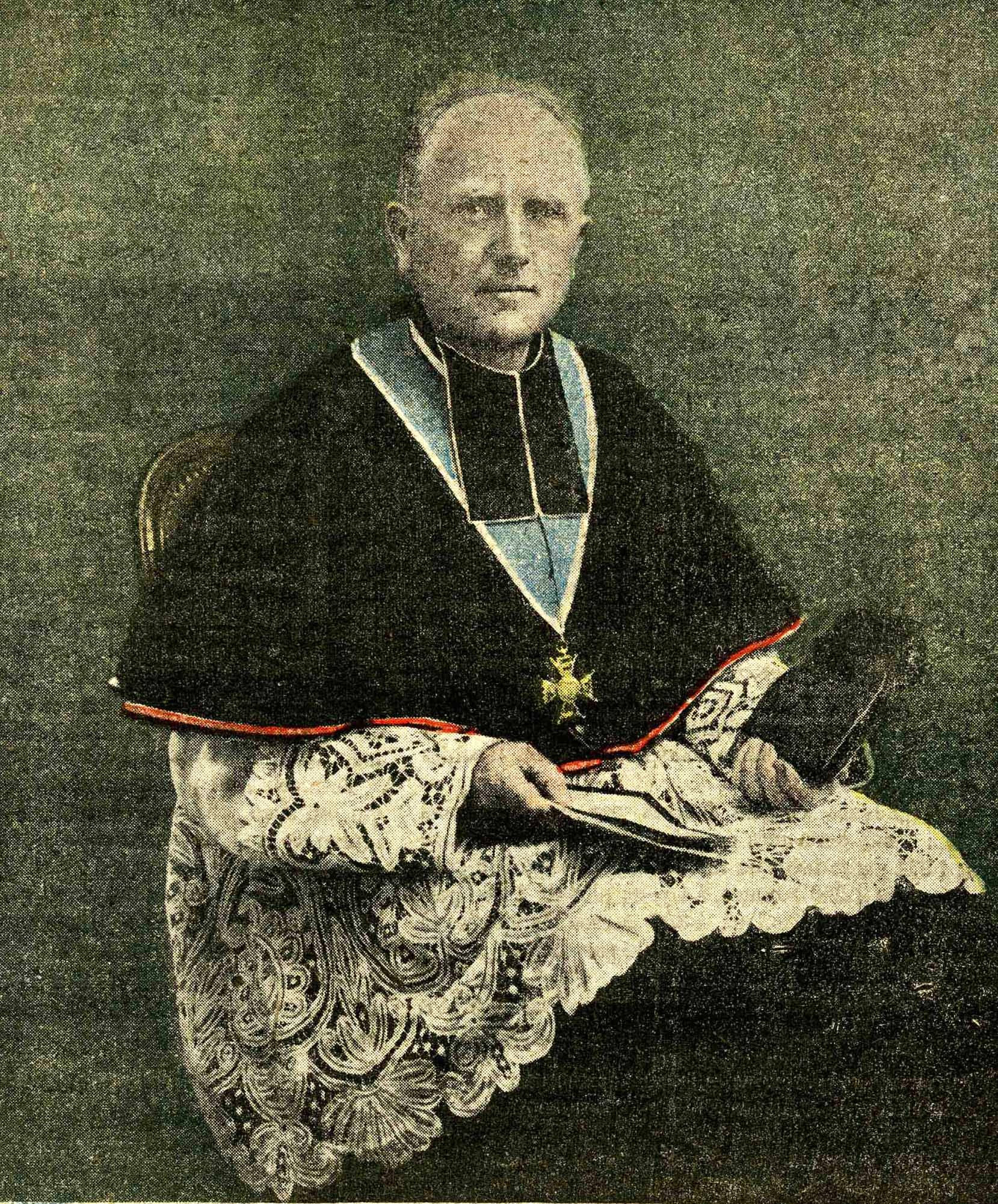
Charles Binet (1869–1936), made a cardinal on 19 December 1927.

At this consistory Pius announced that he had accepted the resignation of French Jesuit theologian Louis Billot from the College of Cardinals, as reported in September. It was the only resignation from the college in the 20th century. Pius X had named him a cardinal in 1911.

With the creation of five non-Italian cardinals at this consistory, the college again reached a numerical balance with 33 Italians and 33 non-Italians. (Note: The next several cardinals to die were all Italians, putting them in the minority once more as early as 30 June 1928 with the death of Cardinal Giovanni Tacci Porcelli, followed by the deaths of Cardinals Gaetano de Lai on 24 October 1928, Giuseppe Francica-Nava de Bontifè on 7 December 1928, Eugenio Tosi on 7 January 1929, Aurelio Galli on 26 March 1929, and Evaristo Lucidi on 31 March 1929.)

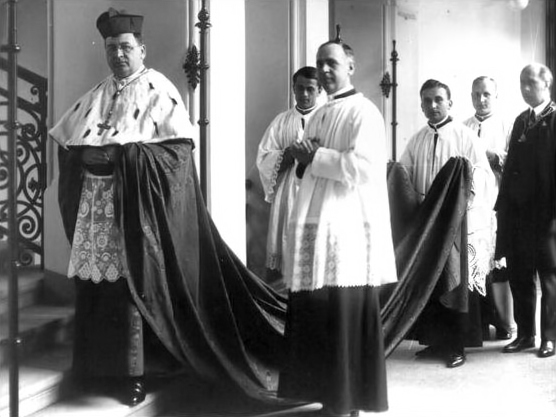
Jusztinián György Serédi (1884–1945), made a cardinal on 19 December 1927.

Name	Title when named cardinal	Country
Alexis Lépicier (1863–1936)	Prior General Emeritus of the Servites	(French Third Republic) France
Felix-Raymond-Marie Rouleau (1866–1931)	Archbishop of Québec	Canada
Pedro Segura y Sáenz (1880–1957)	Archbishop of Burgos	(Restoration (Spain)) Kingdom of Spain
Charles Binet (1869–1936)	Archbishop of Besançon	(French Third Republic) France
Jusztinián György Serédi (1884–1945)	Archbishop of Esztergom	(Kingdom of Hungary (1920–1946)) Kingdom of Hungary

== 15 July 1929 ==
The deaths of several Italians altered the balance in the college by 31 March 1929 to 26 Italians and 33 non-Italians. It was rumored that Pius would appoint more non-Italians once the Holy See reached an agreement with the government of Italy about the legal status of the Vatican City State. Pius named Alfredo Schuster, an Italian of German-Swiss heritage, Archbishop of Milan and made him a cardinal on 15 July 1929.

Name	Title when named cardinal	Country
Alfredo Ildefonso Schuster (1880–1954)	Archbishop of Milan	Kingdom of Italy

== 16 December 1929 ==
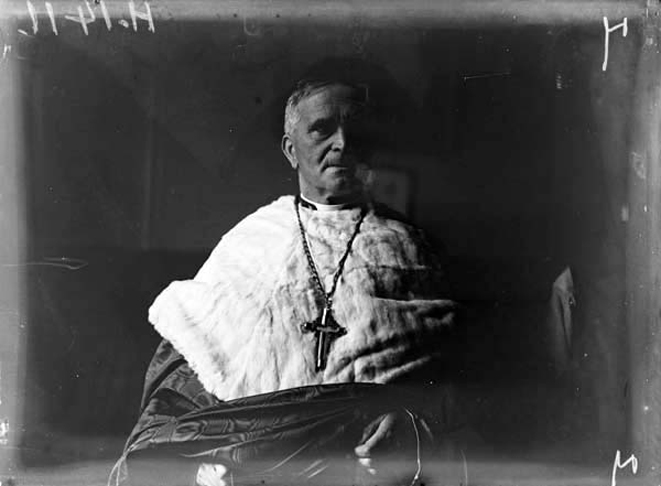
Joseph MacRory (1861–1945), made a cardinal on 16 December 1929.

In advance of this consistory, New York Times correspondent Arnaldo Coresi speculated whether Pius would restore an Italian majority in the College of Cardinals in deference to Italian sensibilities following the ratification of the Lateran Treaty between Italy and the Holy See earlier in the year which the election of a non-Italian pope might disturb. The contrary argument was that creating a non-Italian majority in the college would demonstrate papal independence and allay fears that the Treaty gave Italy undue influence in Church affairs. Pius divided his appointments evenly: three from Italy, and one each from France, Ireland, and Portugal. The consistory left the Italians in the minority, with 30 out of 63 members.

Name	Title when named cardinal	Country
Manuel Gonçalves Cerejeira (1888–1977)	Patriarch of Lisbon	Portugal
Eugenio Pacelli (1876–1958) (Note: Elected as Pope Pius XII (1939–1958))	Apostolic Nuncio to Germany and Apostolic Nuncio to Prussia	Kingdom of Italy
Luigi Lavitrano (1874–1950)	Archbishop of Palermo	Kingdom of Italy
Carlo Minoretti (1861–1938)	Archbishop of Genoa	Kingdom of Italy
Joseph MacRory (1861–1945)	Archbishop of Armagh	(Irish Free State) Ireland
Jean Verdier (1864–1940)	Archbishop of Paris	(French Third Republic) France

== 30 June 1930 ==
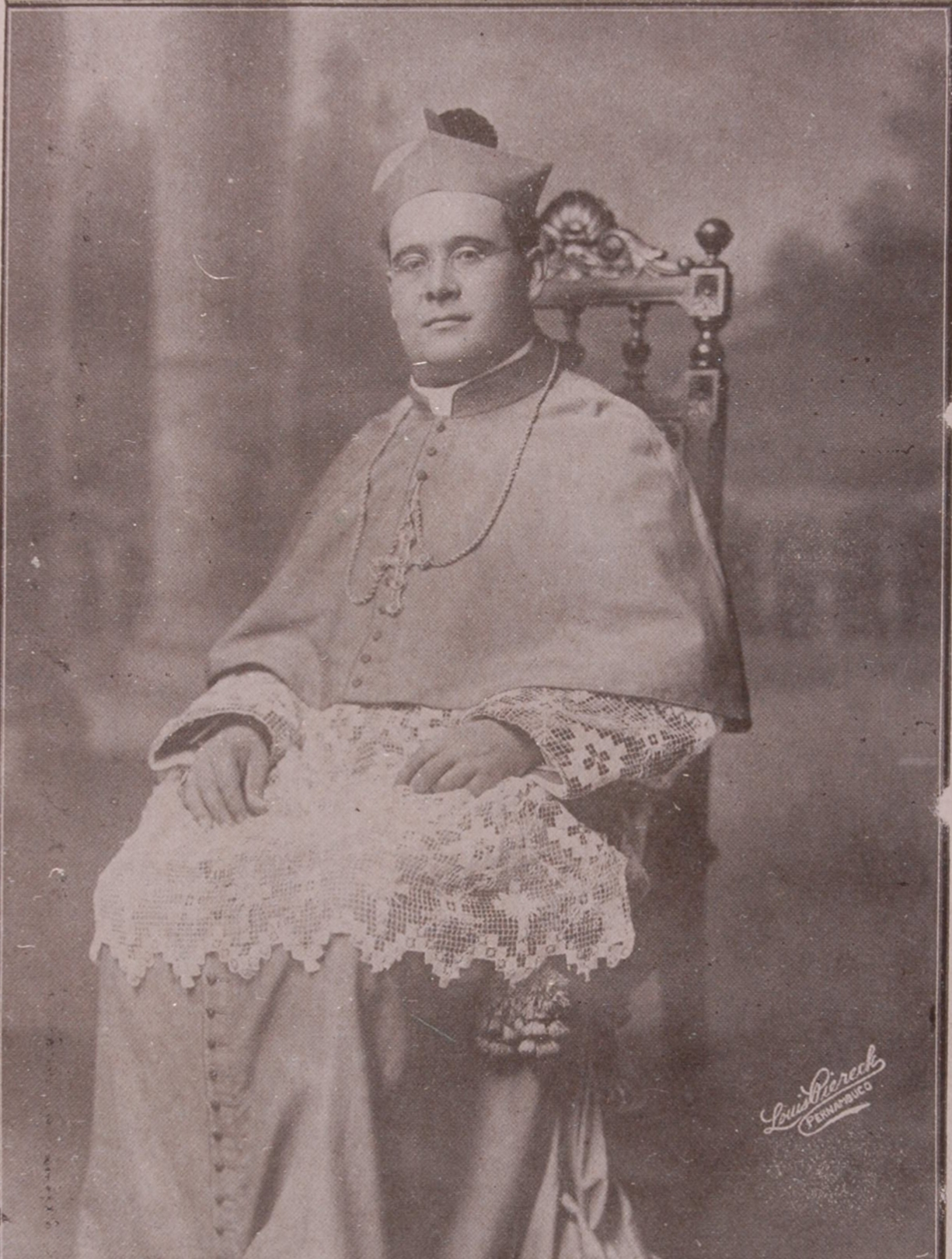
Sebastião da Silveira Cintra (1882–1942), made a cardinal on 30 June 1930.

At this consistory Pius made three Italian officials of the Roman Curia, a Brazilian archbishop, and a French bishop cardinals. It left the college balanced between 31 Italians and 32 non-Italians.

Name	Title when named cardinal	Country
Sebastião da Silveira Cintra (1882–1942)	Archbishop of São Sebastião do Rio de Janeiro	Brazil
Francesco Marchetti Selvaggiani (1871–1951)	Secretary of the Sacred Congregation of the Propagation of the Faith	Kingdom of Italy
Raffaele Rossi (1876–1948)	Secretary of Sacred College of Cardinals	Kingdom of Italy
Giulio Serafini (1867–1938)	Secretary of the Sacred Congregation of the Council	Kingdom of Italy
Achille Liénart (1884–1973)	Bishop of Lille	(French Third Republic) France

== 13 March 1933 ==
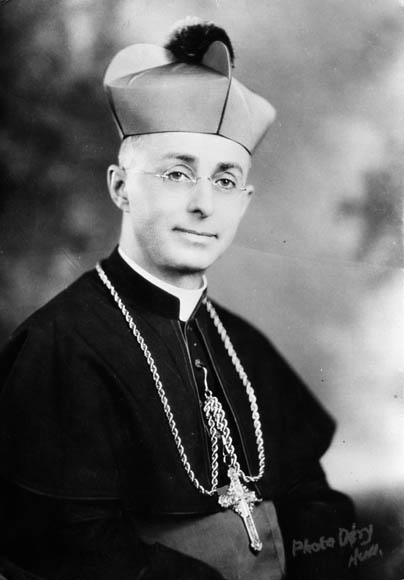
Jean-Marie-Rodrigue Villeneuve (1883–1947), made a cardinal on 13 March 1933.

After creating cardinals at thirteen consistories in less than eight years, Pius waited longer than ever before to hold his next consistory in March 1933, more than two years and eight months. He nevertheless brought the membership of the college from 52 to just 58 by naming six cardinals: four Italians, an Austrian, and a Canadian. This gave the Italians a majority in College for the first time in several years. Pius announced he was making two additional prelates cardinals but withheld their names, which the press speculated meant they were too important in their present posts to be transferred from positions not normally held by a cardinal.

Name	Title when named cardinal	Country
Angelo Dolci (1867–1939)	Apostolic Nuncio to Romania	Kingdom of Italy
Pietro Fumasoni Biondi (1872–1960)	Apostolic Nuncio to the United States	Kingdom of Italy
Maurilio Fossati (1876–1965)	Archbishop of Turin	Kingdom of Italy
Jean-Marie-Rodrigue Villeneuve (1883–1947)	Archbishop of Quebec	Canada
Elia Dalla Costa (1872–1961)	Archbishop of Florence	Kingdom of Italy
Theodor Innitzer (1875–1955)	Archbishop of Vienna	Austria

=== Cardinals in pectore ===
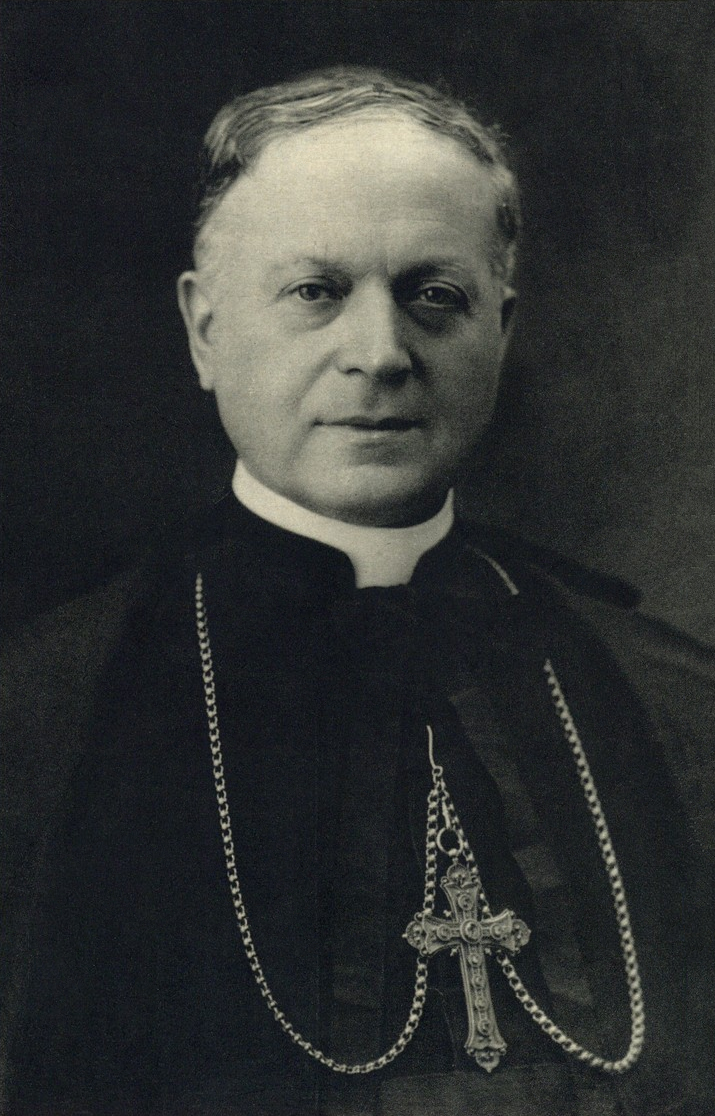
Federico Tedeschini (1873–1959), named cardinal in pectore on 13 March 1933.

Name	Title when named cardinal	Country	Revealed as Cardinal
Federico Tedeschini (1873–1959)	Apostolic Nuncio to Spain	Kingdom of Italy	16 December 1935
Carlo Salotti (1870–1947)	Secretary of the Sacred Congregation of the Propagation of the Faith	Kingdom of Italy	16 December 1935

== 16 December 1935 ==
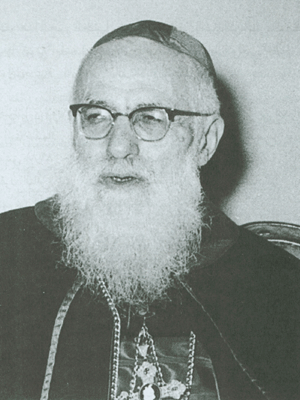
Ignatius Gabriel I Tappouni (1879–1968), made a cardinal on 16 December 1935.

On 21 November 1935, Pope Pius named 18 prelates he planned to make cardinals at a consistory on 16 December. Twelve were Italians and six came from other countries. One of them was the first Eastern Rite patriarch to enter the college since 1895. It was the first consistory to create as many as 18 cardinals since Pius X did so in 1911. (Note: In 1911, Pius X created 19 cardinals, but reserved the name of one in pectore and announced the names of 18.) Pius also revealed the names of two he added secretly in 1933. Four of the new cardinals, papal nuncios unable to attend the ceremony, participated in the next reception of new cardinals in June 1936. (Note: The four and their assignments were Sibilia (Vienna), Marmaggi (Warsaw), Maglioni (Paris), and Tedeschini (Madrid).) As was traditional for the Apostolic Nuncio to Spain, Tedeschini, created in pectore at the previous consistory, received his red biretta from Spanish President Alcalá Zaomora, head of "one of the most officially anti-clerical nations in the world". With this consistory the college grew to 68 members, 37 of them Italians. (Note: But for the death of Cardinal Michele Lega a few hours before the consistory, the College would have reached 69 members.)

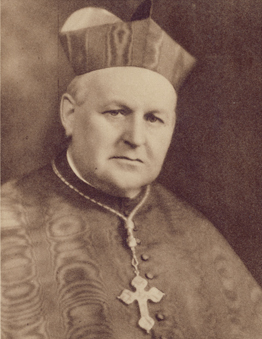
Pietro Boetto (1871–1946), made a cardinal on 16 December 1935.

Name	Title when named cardinal	Country
Ignatius Gabriel I Tappouni (1879–1968)	Patriarch of Antioch of the Syriacs	(Second Syrian Republic) Syria
Enrico Sibilia (1861–1948)	Apostolic Nuncio to Austria	Kingdom of Italy
Francesco Marmaggi (1870–1949)	Apostolic Nuncio to Poland	Kingdom of Italy
Luigi Maglione (1877–1944)	Apostolic Nuncio to France	Kingdom of Italy
Carlo Cremonesi (1866–1943)	Almoner of His Holiness of the Office of Papal Charities	Kingdom of Italy
Alfred-Henri-Marie Baudrillart (1859–1942)	Rector of the Catholic University of Paris	(French Third Republic) France
Emmanuel Célestin Suhard (1874–1949)	Archbishop of Reims	(French Third Republic) France
Karel Kašpar (1870–1941)	Archbishop of Prague	Czechoslovakia
Santiago Copello (1880–1967)	Archbishop of Buenos Aires	Argentina
Isidro Goma y Tomas (1869–1940)	Archbishop of Toledo	(Second Spanish Republic) Spain
Camillo Caccia Dominioni (1877–1946)	Master of Papal Chamber of the Prefecture of the Holy Apostolic Palaces	Kingdom of Italy
Nicola Canali (1874–1961)	Assessor of the Supreme Sacred Congregation of the Holy Office	Kingdom of Italy
Domenico Jorio (1867–1954)	Secretary of the Sacred Congregation for the Discipline of the Sacraments	Kingdom of Italy
Vincenzo Lapuma (1874–1943)	Secretary of the Sacred Congregation of Religious	Kingdom of Italy
Federico Cattani Amadori (1856–1943)	Secretary of the Supreme Tribunal of the Apostolic Signatura	Kingdom of Italy
Massimo Massimi (1877–1954)	Dean of the Sacred Roman Rota	Kingdom of Italy
Domenico Mariani (1863–1939)	Secretary of the Administration of the Patrimony of the Apostolic See	Kingdom of Italy
Pietro Boetto (1871–1946)	Assistant to the Superior General for the Jesuit Province of Italy	Kingdom of Italy

== 15 June 1936 ==
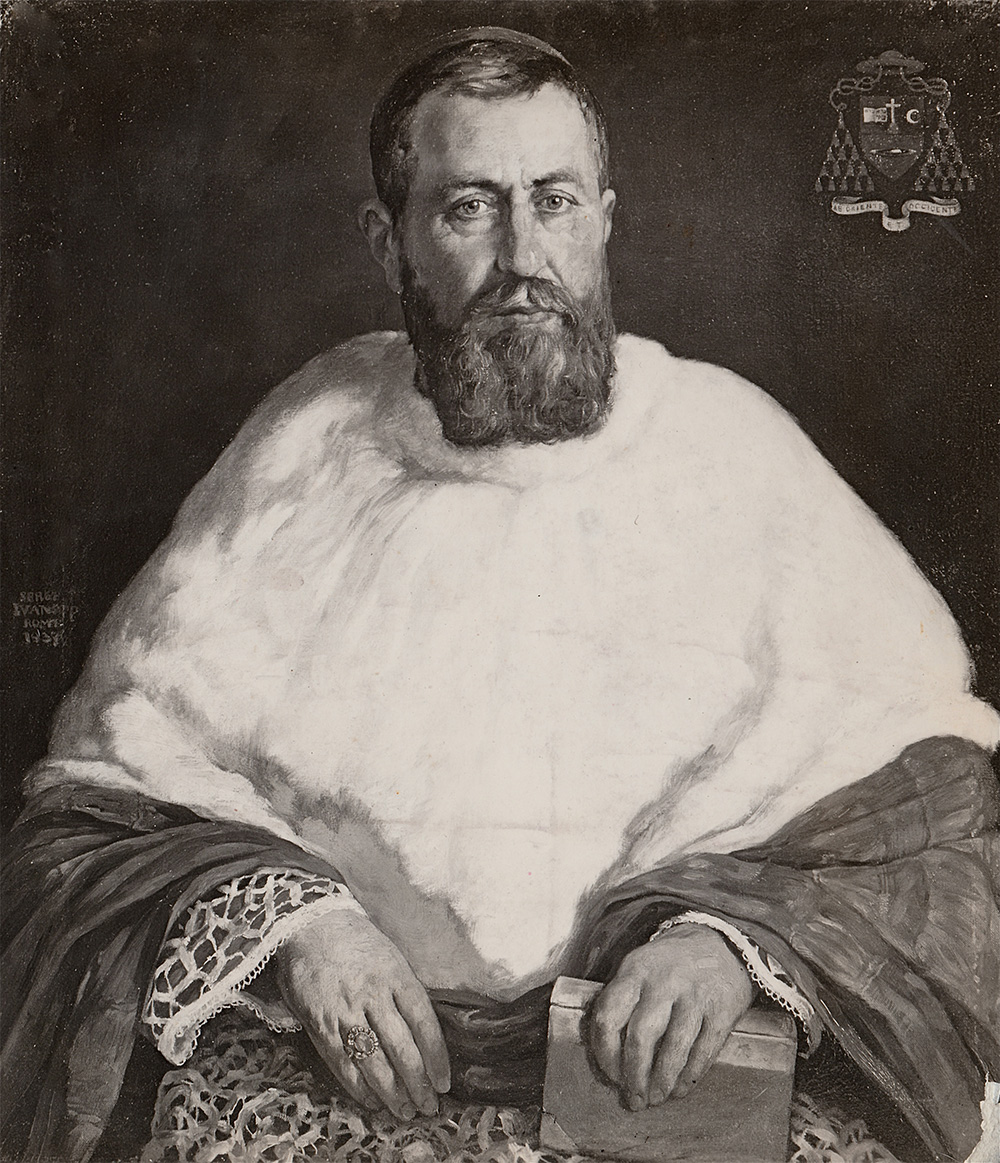
Eugène Tisserant (1884–1972), made a cardinal on 15 June 1936.

Both new cardinals had spent years in various positions at the Vatican Library, where Pius himself had worked early in his career.

Name	Title when named cardinal	Country
Giovanni Mercati (1866–1957)	Prefect of the Vatican Apostolic Library	Kingdom of Italy
Eugène Tisserant (1884–1972)	Pro-Prefect Emeritus of Vatican Apostolic Library	(French Third Republic) France

== 13 December 1937 ==
Pius' health had been so poor that on 21 December 1936 the U.S. weekly magazine Life published picture of the 66 cardinals then living with the advice: "Disregard non-Italians and old men: somewhere among the others is the face of the next Pope." A year later, Pius reminded those assembled at a consistory held in December 1937 that it might be his last. With the appointment of 3 Italians and 2 non-Italians at his last consistory, Pius increased the Italians to 39 out of 60 members of the College of Cardinals.

Name	Title when named cardinal	Country
Adeodato Giovanni Piazza (1884–1957)	Patriarch of Venice	Kingdom of Italy
Ermenegildo Pellegrinetti (1876–1943)	Apostolic Nuncio to Yugoslavia	Kingdom of Italy
Arthur Hinsley (1865–1943)	Archbishop of Westminster	England
Giuseppe Pizzardo (1877–1970)	Secretary of the Sacred Congregation for Extraordinary Ecclesiastical Affairs	Kingdom of Italy
Pierre-Marie Gerlier (1880–1965)	Archbishop of Lyon	(French Third Republic) France
