= Cardinal electors for the 1939 conclave =

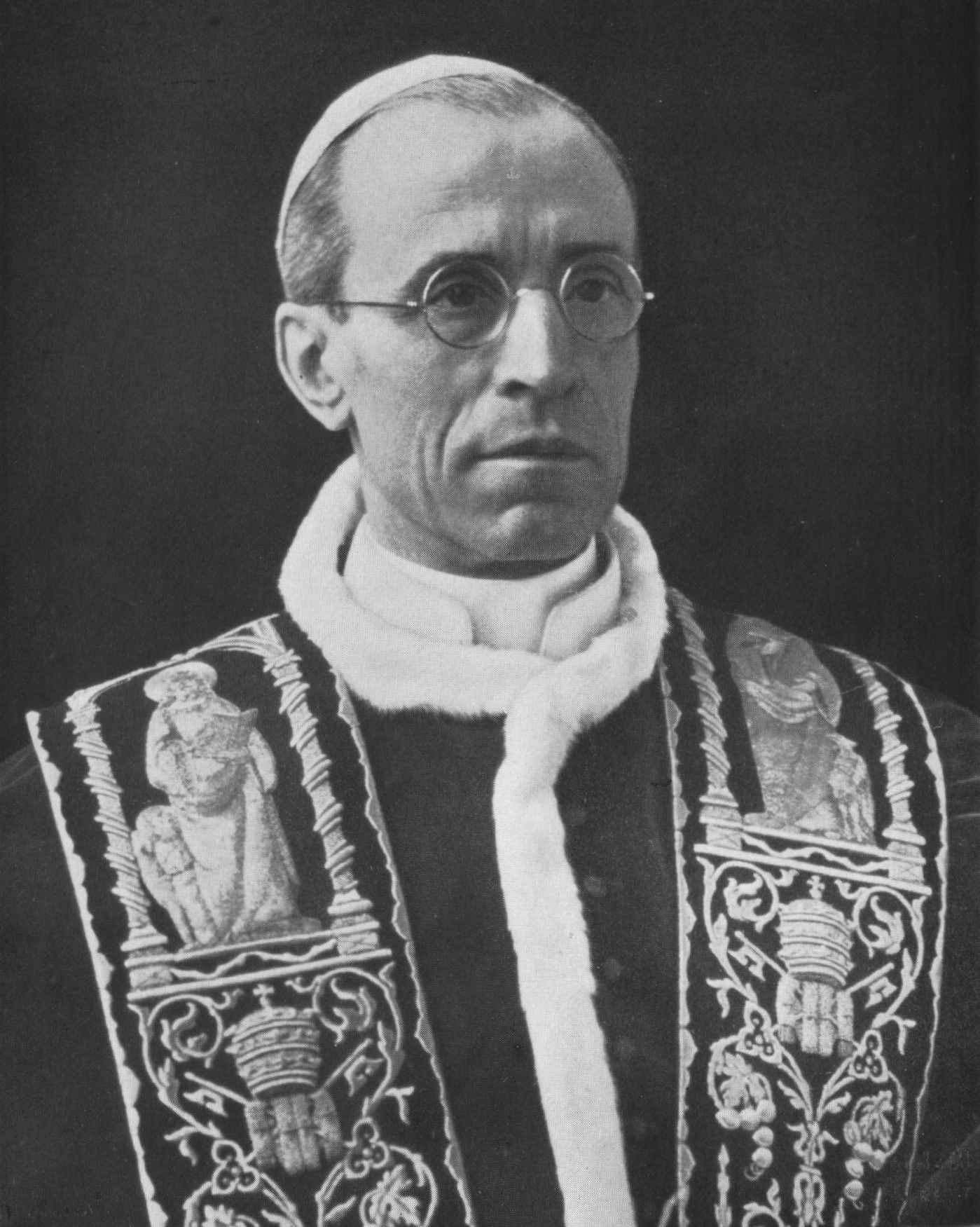
Cardinal Eugenio Pacelli was elected Pope Pius XII by the 1939 conclave on 2 March.

The papal conclave of 1939 was convened to elect a pope, the leader of the Catholic Church, to succeed Pope Pius XI following his death on 10 February 1939. The time period between the previous pope's death and the start of the conclave had been extended by Pius XI's motu proprio, Cum proxime, following the late arrival of several electors in the previous conclave.

Of the 62 members of the College of Cardinals at the time of Pius XI's death, all participated in the subsequent conclave. Of the 62 electors, 6 were cardinal bishops, 48 were cardinal priests, and 8 were cardinal deacons; 2 had been created cardinals by Pope Pius X, 8 by Pope Benedict XV, and 52 by Pope Pius XI; 28 worked in the service of the Holy See (such as in the Roman Curia), 33 were in pastoral ministry outside Rome, and one was in academia. The oldest cardinal elector in the conclave was Gennaro Granito Pignatelli di Belmonte, at the age of 87, and the youngest was Manuel Gonçalves Cerejeira, at the age of 50.

The cardinal electors entered the Sistine Chapel to begin the conclave on 1 March 1939. On 2 March, after three ballots over two days, they elected Cardinal Eugenio Pacelli, the camerlengo and cardinal secretary of state, who took the papal name Pius XII.

== Cardinal electors ==
The data below are as of 10 February 1939, the date on which the Holy See became vacant. Cardinals belonging to institutes of consecrated life or to societies of apostolic life are indicated by the relevant post-nominal letters.

* Elected pope

Rank	Name	Country	Born	Order	Consistory	Office
1	Gennaro Granito Pignatelli di Belmonte	Italy	10 April 1851 (age 87)	CB	27 November 1911; Pius X	Prefect of the Congregation of Ceremonies (Dean)
2	Donato Sbarretti	Italy	12 November 1856 (age 82)	CB	4 December 1916; Benedict XV	Secretary of the Congregation of the Holy Office (Vice-Dean)
3	Tommaso Pio Boggiani OP	Italy	19 January 1863 (age 76)	CB	4 December 1916; Benedict XV	Chancellor of the Apostolic Chancery
4	Enrico Gasparri	Italy	25 July 1871 (age 67)	CB	14 December 1925; Pius XI	Prefect of the Apostolic Signatura
5	Francesco Marchetti Selvaggiani	Italy	1 October 1871 (age 67)	CB	30 June 1930; Pius XI	Vicar General of Rome
6	Angelo Dolci	Italy	12 July 1867 (age 71)	CB	13 March 1933; Pius XI	Archpriest of Santa Maria Maggiore
7	William Henry O'Connell	United States	8 December 1859 (age 79)	CP	27 November 1911; Pius X	Archbishop of Boston
8	Alessio Ascalesi CPPS	Italy	22 October 1872 (age 66)	CP	4 December 1916; Benedict XV	Archbishop of Naples
9	Adolf Bertram	Germany	14 March 1859 (age 79)	CP	4 December 1916; Benedict XV	Archbishop of Breslau
10	Michael von Faulhaber	Germany	5 March 1869 (age 69)	CP	7 March 1921; Benedict XV	Archbishop of Munich and Freising
11	Dennis Joseph Dougherty	United States	16 August 1865 (age 73)	CP	7 March 1921; Benedict XV	Archbishop of Philadelphia
12	Francisco Vidal y Barraquer	Spain	3 October 1868 (age 70)	CP	7 March 1921; Benedict XV	Archbishop of Tarragona
13	Karl Joseph Schulte	Germany	14 September 1871 (age 67)	CP	7 March 1921; Benedict XV	Archbishop of Cologne
14	Giovanni Nasalli Rocca di Corneliano	Italy	27 August 1872 (age 66)	CP	23 May 1923; Pius XI	Archbishop of Bologna
15	George Mundelein	United States	2 July 1872 (age 66)	CP	24 March 1924; Pius XI	Archbishop of Chicago
16	Alessandro Verde	Italy	27 March 1865 (age 73)	CP	14 December 1925; Pius XI	Secretary Emeritus of the Sacred Congregation of Rites
17	Lorenzo Lauri	Italy	15 October 1864 (age 74)	CP	20 December 1926; Pius XI	Major Penitentiary of the Apostolic Penitentiary
18	Jozef-Ernest van Roey	Belgium	13 January 1874 (age 65)	CP	20 June 1927; Pius XI	Archbishop of Mechelen–Brussels
19	August Hlond SDB	Poland	5 July 1881 (age 57)	CP	20 June 1927; Pius XI	Archbishop of Gniezno and Poznań
20	Pedro Segura y Sáenz	Spain	4 December 1880 (age 58)	CP	19 December 1927; Pius XI	Archbishop of Seville
21	Jusztinián György Serédi OSB	Hungary	23 April 1884 (age 54)	CP	19 December 1927; Pius XI	Archbishop of Esztergom
22	Alfredo Ildefonso Schuster OSB	Italy	18 January 1880 (age 59)	CP	15 July 1929; Pius XI	Archbishop of Milan
23	Manuel Gonçalves Cerejeira	Portugal	29 November 1888 (age 50)	CP	16 December 1929; Pius XI	Patriarch of Lisbon
24	Eugenio Pacelli*	Italy	2 March 1876 (age 62)	CP	16 December 1929; Pius XI	Cardinal Secretary of State , Camerlengo of the Holy Roman Church
25	Luigi Lavitrano	Italy	7 March 1874 (age 64)	CP	16 December 1929; Pius XI	Archbishop of Palermo
26	Joseph MacRory	Ireland	19 March 1861 (age 77)	CP	16 December 1929; Pius XI	Archbishop of Armagh
27	Jean Verdier PSS	France	19 February 1864 (age 74)	CP	16 December 1929; Pius XI	Archbishop of Paris
28	Sebastião Leme da Silveira Cintra	Brazil	20 January 1882 (age 57)	CP	30 June 1930; Pius XI	Archbishop of São Sebastião do Rio de Janeiro
29	Raffaele Rossi OCD	Italy	28 October 1876 (age 62)	CP	30 June 1930; Pius XI	Secretary of the Sacred Consistorial Congregation
30	Achille Liénart	France	7 February 1884 (age 55)	CP	30 June 1930; Pius XI	Bishop of Lille
31	Pietro Fumasoni Biondi	Italy	4 September 1872 (age 66)	CP	13 March 1933; Pius XI	Prefect of the Congregation for Propagation of the Faith
32	Federico Tedeschini	Italy	12 October 1873 (age 65)	CP	13 March 1933; Pius XI	Datary of the Apostolic Dataria
33	Maurilio Fossati OSSGCN	Italy	24 May 1876 (age 62)	CP	13 March 1933; Pius XI	Archbishop of Turin
34	Carlo Salotti	Italy	25 July 1870 (age 68)	CP	13 March 1933; Pius XI	Prefect of the Sacred Congregation of Rites
35	Jean-Marie-Rodrigue Villeneuve OMI	Canada	2 November 1883 (age 55)	CP	13 March 1933; Pius XI	Archbishop of Quebec
36	Elia Dalla Costa	Italy	14 May 1872 (age 66)	CP	13 March 1933; Pius XI	Archbishop of Florence
37	Theodor Innitzer	Germany	25 December 1875 (age 63)	CP	13 March 1933; Pius XI	Archbishop of Vienna
38	Ignatius Gabriel I Tappouni	Lebanon	3 November 1879 (age 59)	CP	16 December 1935; Pius XI	Syriac Patriarch of Antioch
39	Enrico Sibilia	Italy	17 November 1861 (age 77)	CP	16 December 1935; Pius XI	Apostolic Nuncio Emeritus to Austria
40	Francesco Marmaggi	Italy	31 August 1876 (age 62)	CP	16 December 1935; Pius XI	Apostolic Nuncio Emeritus to Poland
41	Luigi Maglione	Italy	2 March 1877 (age 61)	CP	16 December 1935; Pius XI	Prefect of the Congregation of the Council
42	Carlo Cremonesi	Italy	4 November 1866 (age 72)	CP	16 December 1935; Pius XI	Almoner Emeritus of the Office of Papal Charities
43	Alfred Baudrillart CO	France	6 January 1859 (age 80)	CP	16 December 1935; Pius XI	Rector of the Catholic University of Paris
44	Emmanuel Célestin Suhard	France	5 April 1874 (age 64)	CP	16 December 1935; Pius XI	Archbishop of Reims
45	Karel Kašpar	Czechoslovakia	16 May 1870 (age 68)	CP	16 December 1935; Pius XI	Archbishop of Prague
46	Santiago Copello	Argentina	7 January 1880 (age 59)	CP	16 December 1935; Pius XI	Archbishop of Buenos Aires
47	Isidro Gomá y Tomás	Spain	19 August 1869 (age 69)	CP	16 December 1935; Pius XI	Archbishop of Toledo
48	Pietro Boetto SJ	Italy	19 May 1871 (age 67)	CP	16 December 1935; Pius XI	Archbishop of Genoa
49	Eugène Tisserant	France	24 March 1884 (age 54)	CP	15 June 1936; Pius XI	Secretary of the Congregation for the Oriental Churches
50	Adeodato Giovanni Piazza OCD	Italy	30 September 1884 (age 54)	CP	13 December 1937; Pius XI	Patriarch of Venice
51	Ermenegildo Pellegrinetti	Italy	27 March 1876 (age 62)	CP	13 December 1937; Pius XI	Apostolic Nuncio to Yugoslavia
52	Arthur Hinsley	United Kingdom	25 August 1865 (age 73)	CP	13 December 1937; Pius XI	Archbishop of Westminster
53	Giuseppe Pizzardo	Italy	13 July 1877 (age 61)	CP	13 December 1937; Pius XI	Secretary Emeritus of the Congregation for Extraordinary Ecclesiastical Affairs
54	Pierre-Marie Gerlier	France	14 January 1880 (age 59)	CP	13 December 1937; Pius XI	Archbishop of Lyon
55	Camillo Caccia Dominioni	Italy	7 February 1877 (age 62)	CD	13 December 1937; Pius XI	Prefect of the Pontifical Household (Protodeacon)
56	Nicola Canali	Italy	6 June 1874 (age 64)	CD	16 December 1935; Pius XI	Assessor of the Congregation of the Holy Office
57	Domenico Jorio	Italy	7 October 1867 (age 71)	CD	16 December 1935; Pius XI	Prefect of the Congregation of the Discipline of the Sacraments
58	Vincenzo Lapuma	Italy	22 January 1874 (age 65)	CD	16 December 1935; Pius XI	Prefect of the Congregation for Religious
59	Federico Cattani Amadori	Italy	17 April 1856 (age 82)	CD	16 December 1935; Pius XI	Secretary of the Apostolic Signatura
60	Massimo Massimi	Italy	10 April 1877 (age 61)	CD	16 December 1935; Pius XI	President of the Pontifical Commission for the Redaction of the Code of Oriental Canon Law
61	Domenico Mariani	Italy	3 April 1863 (age 75)	CD	16 December 1935; Pius XI	President of the Administration of the Property of the Holy See
62	Giovanni Mercati	Italy	17 December 1866 (age 72)	CD	15 June 1936; Pius XI	Archivist of the Vatican Secret Archive, Librarian of the Vatican Library

== Cardinal electors by continent and country ==
The 62 attending cardinal electors were from 16 countries. The countries with the greatest number of cardinal electors were Italy (thirty-four), France (six), and Germany (five).

(Theodor Innitzer, the Archbishop of Vienna was originally from Austria, which had been annexed by Germany a year before the conclave, and ceased to be an independent state.)

* Continent or country of elected pope

Cardinal electors by continent
Continent	Number	Percentage
North America	4	6.5%
South America	2	1.6%
Asia	1	1.6%
Europe*	55	88.7%
Total	62	100.0%

Cardinal electors by country
Country	Continent	Number
Argentina	South America	1
Belgium	Europe	1
Brazil	South America	1
Canada	North America	1
Czechoslovakia	Europe	1
France	Europe	6
Germany	Europe	5
Hungary	Europe	1
Ireland	Europe	1
Italy*	Europe	34
Lebanon	Asia	1
Poland	Europe	1
Portugal	Europe	1
Spain	Europe	3
United Kingdom	Europe	1
United States	North America	3
Total		62

== See also ==
- Cardinals created by Pius X
- Cardinals created by Benedict XV
- Cardinals created by Pius XI
- Cardinal electors for the 1922 conclave
- Cardinal electors for the 1958 conclave
