= Pietro Ciriaci =

Italian Cardinal (1885–1966)

His Eminence Pietro Ciriaci
- Prefect of the Congregation of the Council
- Church: Roman Catholic Church
- Appointed: 20 March 1954
- Term ended: 30 December 1966
- Predecessor: Giuseppe Bruno
- Successor: Jean-Marie Villot
- Other posts: President of the Pontifical Commission for the Revision of the Code of Canon Law (1955–66); Cardinal-Priest of San Lorenzo in Lucina (1964–66)
- Previous posts: Undersecretary of the Congregation for Extraordinary Ecclesiastical Affairs (1921–28); Apostolic Nuncio to Czechoslovakia (1928–34); Titular Archbishop of Tarsus (1928–53); Apostolic Nuncio to Portugal (1934–53); Apostolic Pro-Nuncio to Portugal (1953); Cardinal-Priest of Santa Prassede (1953–64)

Orders
- Ordination: 18 December 1909
- Consecration: 18 March 1928 by Pietro Gasparri, Carlo Cremonesi, and Agostino Zampini
- Created cardinal: 12 January 1953 by Pope Pius XII
- Rank: Cardinal-Priest

Personal details
- Born: Pietro Ciriaci; 2 December 1885 Rome, Kingdom of Italy
- Died: 30 December 1966 (aged 81) Rome, Italy
- Buried: San Lorenzo in Lucina
- Parents: Giuseppe Ciriaci; Maria Giuggiolini Magnaterra
- Education: Pontifical Roman Seminary; Pontifical Roman Athenaeum Saint Apollinare
- Motto: Dominus regit me
- Coat of arms

Styles of Pietro Ciriaci
- Reference style: His Eminence
- Spoken style: Your Eminence
- Informal style: Cardinal
- See: none

Pietro Ciriaci (2 December 1885 – 30 December 1966) was an Italian Cardinal of the Catholic Church who served as prefect of the Sacred Congregation of the Council in the Roman Curia from 1954 until his death, and was elevated to the cardinalate in 1953 by Pope Pius XII.

== Early life and education ==
Ciriaci was born in Rome to Giuseppe Ciriaci and his wife Maria Giuggiolini Magnaterra. Baptized in the church of San Crisogono, he received his first Communion on 27 June 1897. Ciriaci entered the Pontifical Roman Seminary on 31 October 1902, and then studied at the Pontifical Roman Athenaeum S. Apollinare, where he obtained doctorates in philosophy (5 July 1904), theology (6 July 1909), and canon law (8 November 1911).

== Career ==
Ordained to the priesthood on 18 December 1909, he was named vice-pastor of a Roman parish on 18 July 1910. Ciriaci then taught ethical philosophy and later fundamental theology at his alma mater of the Pontifical Roman Athenaeum S. Apollinare until 1926. He entered the Roman Curia as a scrittore of the Apostolic Penitentiary on 21 January 1911, and was promoted to registratore of the same on the following 15 December.

Before being raised to the rank of a Privy Chamberlain Supernumerary on 26 October 1918, Ciriaci was named an official of the Sacred Congregation of the Council (22 February 1913) and of the first section of the Sacred Congregation for Extraordinary Ecclesiastical Affairs (16 June 1917). He was named Undersecretary of Extraordinary Ecclesiastical Affairs on 14 May 1921, and a Domestic Prelate of His Holiness on 27 March 1922.

In 1927, Czechoslovakia replaced the holiday of St. John Chrysostom with that of Jan Hus, a heretic in the eyes of the Catholic Church (the underlying problem was the fact that hundreds of Catholic places of worship had been previously seized and assigned to the new Czechoslovak Hussite Church with an openly anti-Catholic purpose) The Apostolic Nuncio to Czechoslovakia, Archbishop Francesco Marmaggi, left Prague in protest. On 27 March, Ciriaci was sent to Czechoslovakia as a special envoy to resolve the dispute and conclude an agreement between Czechoslovakia and the Holy See. A temporary agreement–a modus vivendi rather than a concordat–was signed on 17 December.

On 15 February 1928, Ciriaci was appointed Nuncio to Czechoslovakia and Titular Archbishop of Tarsus by Pope Pius XI. He received his episcopal consecration on the following 18 March from Cardinal Pietro Gasparri. Ciriaci was named Apostolic Nuncio to Portugal on 9 January 1934.

Pope Pius XII made him Cardinal-Priest of Santa Prassede in the consistory of 12 January 1953. Ciriaci was named Prefect of the Sacred Congregation of the council on 20 March 1954, and President of the Pontifical Commission for the Interpretation of the Code of Canon Law on 31 May 1955. He participated in the 1958 papal conclave that elected Pope John XXIII and attended the Second Vatican Council from 1962 to 1965. He served as a cardinal elector in the conclave of 1963 that elected Pope Paul VI. On 26 September 1964, he opted to become a cardinal-priest, with title of San Lorenzo in Lucina.

== Death ==
Ciriaci died in Rome on 30 December 1966 at age 81. His funeral Mass was celebrated by Pope Paul on 3 January 1967, in the basilica of San Lorenzo in Lucina. He was buried in a chapel near the same basilica.

Diplomatic posts
Preceded by Francesco Marmaggi	Nuncio to Czechoslovakia; 1928–1934	Succeeded by Saverio Ritter
Preceded by Giovanni Cardinale, OSB	Apostolic Nuncio to Portugal; 1934–1954	Succeeded by Fernando Cento
Catholic Church titles
Preceded by Giuseppe Bruno	Prefect of the Sacred Congregation of the Council; 1954–1966	Succeeded by Jean-Marie Villot
Preceded by Massimo Massimi	President of the Pontifical Commission for the Interpretation of the Code of Canon Law; 1955–1966	Succeeded by Pericle Felici
