= Saverio Ritter =

- Titular Archbishop of Aegina
- Church: Catholic Church
- In office: 5 August 1935 – 21 April 1951
- Predecessor: John Joseph Mitty
- Successor: Raffaele Forni
- Other post: Official of the Secretariat of State (1948-1951)
- Previous posts: Apostolic Internuncio to Czechoslovakia (1946-1948); Apostolic Nuncio to Czechoslovakia (1935-1939)

Orders
- Ordination: 9 September 1906
- Consecration: 11 August 1935 by Eugenio Maria Giuseppe Giovanni Pacelli

Personal details
- Born: 24 January 1884 Chiavenna, Lombardy, Kingdom of Italy
- Died: 21 April 1951 (aged 67)

Saverio Ritter (24 January 1884 – 21 April 1951) was an Italian prelate of the Catholic Church who worked in the diplomatic service of the Holy See.

== Life ==
Ritter was born in Chiavenna, in the Province of Sondrio, Italy, on 24 January 1884 and was ordained priest on 9 September 1906.

He was posted to Prague as secretary of the nunciature in 1927 along with Pietro Ciriaci to resolve the ongoing crisis in diplomatic relations between Czechoslovakia and the Holy See occasioned by local celebrations of Jan Hus, viewed as a heretic by the Church and a national hero to many Czechs; the underlying problem was the fact that hundreds of Catholic places of worship had been previously seized and assigned to the new Czechoslovak Hussite Church with an openly anti-Catholic purpose. The Nuncio to Czechoslovakia, Francesco Marmaggi, had withdrawn to Rome in protest.

On 5 August 1935 he was named a titular archbishop and appointed Apostolic Nuncio to Czechoslovakia. He was consecrated a bishop by cardinal Eugenio Pacelli on 11 August 1935.

His service in Prague was interrupted by the creation of the Protectorate of Bohemia and Moravia in March 1939, a few months before the outbreak of World War II, when the German Nazi regime established also a client state, the Slovak Republic, which was recognized by several countries, including the Holy See, which maintained a diplomatic office headed by a chargé d'affaires, Giuseppe Burzio.

On 11 May 1946 Ritter was named Internuncio to Czechoslovakia, (recreated as Third Czechoslovak Republic), but illness allowed him to perform his duties only intermittently. Nevertheless, because of his support for the Czechoslovak bishops against the new regime, the government declared him undesirable in March 1949 and he left Prague in July.

He was posted to the Secretariat of State in Rome in 1948.

He died in Rome on 21 April 1951.
