= Francesco Ragonesi =

His Eminence Francesco Ragonesi
- Prefect of the Apostolic Signatura
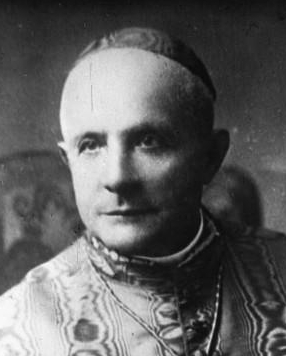
- The cardinal pictured in 1922.
- Church: Roman Catholic Church
- Appointed: 9 March 1926
- Term ended: 14 September 1931
- Predecessor: Augusto Silj
- Successor: Bonaventura Cerretti
- Other post: Cardinal-Priest of San Marcello (1921–31)
- Previous posts: Apostolic Delegate to Colombia (1904–13); Titular Archbishop of Myra (1904–21); Apostolic Nuncio to Spain (1913–21)

Orders
- Ordination: 1874
- Consecration: 25 September 1904 by Rafael Merry del Val y Zulueta
- Created cardinal: 7 March 1921 by Pope Benedict XV
- Rank: Cardinal-Priest

Personal details
- Born: Francesco Ragonesi; 21 December 1850 Bagnaia, Viterbo, Papal States
- Died: 14 September 1931 (aged 80) Poggio a Caiano, Pistoia, Kingdom of Italy
- Education: Pontifical Roman Athenaeum Saint Apollinare
- Coat of arms

Styles of Francesco Ragonesi
- Reference style: His Eminence
- Spoken style: Your Eminence
- Informal style: Cardinal
- See: Myra (titular see)

Francesco Cardinal Ragonesi S.T.D. J.U.D. (21 December 1850 – 14 September 1931) was a Cardinal of the Roman Catholic Church and was the Prefect of the Supreme Tribunal of the Apostolic Signatura.

== Biography ==
Francesco Ragonesi was born in Bagnaia, Viterbo, Italy. He was educated at the seminary of Viterbo, and from 1869 at the Pio-Roman Seminary, and at the Pontifical Roman Athenaeum S. Apollinare, where he earned doctorates in philosophy, theology and a doctorate utroque iuris (in both canon and civil law).

He was ordained in 1874 and worked in the diocese of Viterbo, where he did pastoral work and for twenty-five years served as a professor of history and Scripture in its seminary. He became archcanon of the cathedral chapter as well as being elected vicar capitular of the diocese. Between 1885 and 1904, he served as vicar general. He was created Domestic prelate of His Holiness on 12 June 1889. He was appointed Apostolic delegate and extraordinary envoy to Colombia on 7 September 1904. During his tenure, he favored the opening of the Panama Canal in that country.

He was appointed as titular archbishop of Myra on 16 September 1904 by Pope Pius X and was consecrated on 25 September by Rafael Merry del Val, Cardinal Secretary of State. He served as Nuncio in Spain with faculties of legate a latere from 1913 until 1921.

He was created Cardinal-Priest of San Marcello in the consistory of 7 March 1921 by Pope Benedict XV. Since he was Nuncio to Spain, he received his cardinal's hat from the King of Spain and then his other regalia at the next consistory in June.

He participated in the conclave of 1922 that elected Pope Pius XI. He was appointed as Prefect of the Apostolic Signatura by Pope Pius on 9 March 1926.

He died in 1931, in the mother-house of the Sisters of the Sacred Heart of Jesus, Poggio a Caiano, Pistoia, where he had gone to recover his health. He is buried at the Campo Verano cemetery in Rome.

== Honours ==
=== Foreign Honours ===
Spain:

- Grand Cross with Collar of the Order of Charles III (20 August 1924)

Catholic Church titles
Preceded by Augusto Silj	Prefect of the Supreme Tribunal of the Apostolic Signatura; 9 March 1926 – 14 September 1931	Succeeded by Bonaventura Cerretti
