= General Directory for Catechesis =

The General Directory for Catechesis is a document written by the Congregation for the Clergy of the Catholic Church, based in Rome. That Congregation no longer has responsibility for the issues addressed in this document. In January 2013, its competency for catechesis was transferred to the Pontifical Council for the Promotion of the New Evangelisation.

The Second Vatican Council determined that "general directories" should be prepared covering a range of pastoral activities in the life of the church.

Following publication of the General Catechetical Directory in 1971, the Holy See realised the importance of a wealth of new developments in the life of the Church and of the world, and so in 1997 the first edition of the General Directory for Catechesis was produced.

== Contents ==
The document largely discusses practical and theoretical aspects of linking catechesis to evangelization. It is addressed both to the clergy and lay catechists. It points to the Catechism of the Catholic Church as a primary reference source for the teaching of faith, religious instruction and the new evangelization.

The document is extensively referred to by the Statuta of the Neocatechumenal Way, regarding basic aspects of the catechesis in the Church:

- Christian initiation as basic and fundamental for a parish:

Initiatory catechesis is thus the necessary link between missionary activity, which calls to faith, and pastoral activity, which continually nourishes the Christian community. This is not, therefore, an optional activity, but basic and fundamental... Without it, missionary activity lacks continuity and is sterile, while pastoral activity lacks roots and becomes superficial and confused: any misfortune could cause collapse of the entire building. No 64 cf also 91 (Statuta, Art. 6 §2)

- role of a parish priest, no 225 (Statuta, Art. 6 §2), and of teams of catechists - no 268 (Statuta, Art. 17 §3)
- community dimension:

Catechesis prepares the Christian to live in community and to participate actively in the life and mission of the Church - no 86 (Statuta, Art. 17 §1).

Ongoing formation in the faith is directed not only to Christians individually, to accompany them on their journey towards holiness, but also to the Christian community as such so that it may mature also in its interior life of love of God and of the brethren, as well as in its openness to the world as missionary community The desire of Jesus and his prayer to the Father are an unceasing appeal: 'May they all be one; even as You, Father, are in me, and I in You, that they may also be in us, so that the world may believe that You have sent me' (Jn 17:21). Approaching this ideal, little by little, demands of the community a great fidelity to the action of the Holy Spirit, constant nourishment with the Body and Blood of the Lord and ongoing education in faith, in listening to the Word. - no 70 (Statuta, Art. 22 §1)

- fostering vocations - no 86 (Statuta, Art. 18 §1)
- transmitting faith by parents to their children - nos 226-225 and 255, cf. CIC c.774 §2; CCEO c. 618.
