= Domenico Mariani =

His Eminence Domenico Mariani
- President of the Administration of the Property of the Holy See
- Church: Roman Catholic Church
- Appointed: 21 December 1935
- Term ended: 23 April 1939
- Other post: Cardinal-Deacon of San Cesareo in Palatio (1935-39)
- Previous posts: Secretary of the Commission for the Patrimony of the Holy See (1917-26); Secretary of the Administration of the Property of the Holy See (1917-35)

Orders
- Ordination: 18 December 1886
- Created cardinal: 16 December 1935 by Pope Pius XI
- Rank: Cardinal-Deacon

Personal details
- Born: Domenico Mariani; 3 April 1863 Posta, Rieti, Papal States
- Died: 23 April 1939 (aged 76) Vatican City
- Buried: Campo Verano
- Education: Pontifical Roman Seminary

Styles of Domenico Mariani
- Reference style: His Eminence
- Spoken style: Your Eminence
- Informal style: Cardinal
- See: none

Domenico Mariani (3 April 1863 – 23 April 1939) was an Italian cardinal of the Roman Catholic Church who was President of the Administration of the Property of the Holy See from 1935 until his death, following eighteen years as secretary of that body.

== Early life and priesthood ==
Domenico Mariani was born in Posta, Italy. He was educated at the Lyceum "Angelo Mai", Rome, and the Pontifical Roman Seminary there.

He was ordained on 18 December 1886, and performed pastoral work in Diocese of Rome until 1900.

He was Canon of the Vatican Basilica until 1917, and was created Privy Chamberlain of His Holiness, on 30 September 1914.

He served as Secretary of the Cardinalitial Commission for the Administration of the Properties of the Holy See from 1917. He was raised to the rank of Domestic Prelate of His Holiness on 26 January 1917.

== Cardinalate ==
He was created Cardinal-Deacon of S. Cesareo in Palatio in the consistory of 16 December 1935 by Pope Pius XI. Two days later he was named President of the Administration of the Property of the Holy See (renamed in 1967 the Administration of the Patrimony of the Apostolic See).

He took part in the conclave of 1939 that elected Pope Pius XII.

He died on 23 April 1939, and is buried in the Campo Verano cemetery.

Preceded by ?	President of the Administration of the Property of the Holy See; 21 December 1935 – 23 April 1939	Succeeded by Amleto Giovanni Cicognani
