= Giuseppe Bruno (cardinal) =

Roman Catholic Cardinal

His Eminence Giuseppe Bruno
- Prefect of the Apostolic Signatura
- Church: Catholic Church
- Appointed: 20 March 1954
- Term ended: 10 November 1954
- Predecessor: Massimo Massimi
- Successor: Francesco Roberti
- Other posts: Cardinal-Deacon of Sant'Eustachio (1946–54); Camerlengo of the College of Cardinals (1952–54); President of the Pontifical Commission for the Authentic Interpretation of the Code of Canon Law (1954)
- Previous posts: Secretary of the Pontifical Commission for the Authentic Interpretation of the Code of Canon Law (1924–46); Secretary of the Congregation of the Council (1930–46); Prefect of the Congregation of the Council (1949–54)

Orders
- Ordination: 10 April 1898
- Created cardinal: 18 February 1946 by Pope Pius XII
- Rank: Cardinal-Deacon

Personal details
- Born: Giuseppe Bruno; 30 June 1875 Sezzadio, Acqui, Kingdom of Italy
- Died: 10 November 1954 (aged 79) Rome, Italy
- Buried: Campo Verano
- Education: Pontifical Academy of Saint Thomas Aquinas; Pontifical Roman Athenaeum Saint Apollinare
- Motto: Justitia et Pax
- Coat of arms

Styles of Giuseppe Bruno
- Reference style: His Eminence
- Spoken style: Your Eminence
- Informal style: Cardinal
- See: none

Giuseppe Bruno (30 June 1875 – 10 November 1954) was a cardinal of the Catholic Church who served as Secretary of the Sacred Congregation of the Council and as Prefect of the Apostolic Signatura.

== Early life and priesthood ==
He was born in Sezzadio, Italy.

He was educated at the Seminary of Acqui and the Pontifical Athenaeum "S. Tommaso d'Aquino", where he earned a doctorate in philosophy. He continued his studied at the Pontifical Athenaeum "S. Apollinare" where he became a Doctor of Sacred Theology (S.T.D.)and a Doctor of Canon and Civil Law (J.U.D.).

He was ordained on 10 April 1898 in Acqui. He did pastoral work in the diocese Acqui. He served as Professor of law at the Pontifical Athenaeum "S. Apollinare" for many years. He was created Privy chamberlain of His Holiness on 4 March 1922 and was raised to the level of Domestic prelate of His Holiness on 3 January 1923. He was appointed Secretary of the Pontifical Commission for the Authentic Interpretation of the Code of Canon Law on 14 February 1924. He was secretary of the Congregation of the Council from 3 July 1930 until 1946. He was raised to the rank of Protonotary apostolic on 25 July 1932.

== Cardinalate ==
He was created Cardinal-Deacon of S. Eustachio in the consistory of 18 February 1946 by Pope Pius XII. He was appointed Prefect of the Congregation of the council on 16 November 1949, holding the post until 20 March 1954, when he became Prefect of the Supreme Tribunal of the Apostolic Signature on 20 March 1954.

He died on 10 November 1954. The funeral took place on 13 November 1954, at the basilica of Santa Maria sopra Minerva, Rome with Giuseppe dell'Olmo, bishop of Acqui, celebrating the mass; fourteen cardinals were also present; at the end of the ceremony, Cardinal Clemente Micara, vice-dean of the Sacred College of Cardinals, imparted the absolution in the name of the pope. His body was buried in the Campo Verano cemetery.

Preceded by Francesco Marmaggi	Prefect of the Congregation of the Council; 16 November 1949 – 20 March 1954	Succeeded by Pietro Ciriaci
Preceded by Massimo Massimi	Prefect of the Supreme Tribunal of the Apostolic Signatura; 20 March 1954 – 10 November 1954	Succeeded by Gaetano Cicognani
