= Bonaventura Cerretti =

Italian Catholic priest and professor

His Eminence Bonaventura Cerretti
- Prefect of the Apostolic Signatura
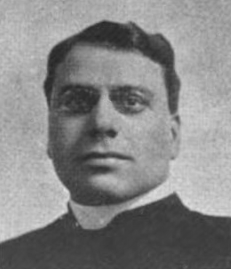
- Church: Roman Catholic Church
- Appointed: 12 October 1931
- Term ended: 8 May 1933
- Predecessor: Francesco Ragonesi
- Successor: Enrico Gasparri
- Other posts: Archpriest of the Basilica di Santa Maria Maggiore (1930–33); Camerlengo of the College of Cardinals (1933); Cardinal-Bishop of Velletri (1933)
- Previous posts: Titular Archbishop of Philippopolis (1914); Titular Archbishop of Corinthus (1914–25); Apostolic Delegate to Australia (1914–17); Secretary of the Congregation for Extraordinary Ecclesiastical Affairs (1917–21); Apostolic Nuncio to France (1921–25); Apostolic Pro-Nuncio to France (1925–26); Cardinal-Priest of Santa Cecilia (1926–33)

Orders
- Ordination: 31 March 1895 by Tancredo Fausti
- Consecration: 19 July 1914 by Rafael Merry del Val y Zulueta
- Created cardinal: 14 December 1925 by Pope Pius XI
- Rank: Cardinal-Priest (1926–33); Cardinal-Bishop (1933)

Personal details
- Born: Bonaventura Cerretti; 17 June 1872 Comune de Bardono, Orvieto, Kingdom of Italy
- Died: 8 May 1933 (aged 60) Rome, Kingdom of Italy
- Buried: Santa Maria in Trastevere
- Parents: Faustino Cerretti; Maria Custodi
- Education: Pontifical Gregorian University
- Motto: Robur in fide
- Coat of arms

Styles of Bonaventura Cerretti
- Reference style: His Eminence
- Spoken style: Your Eminence
- Informal style: Cardinal
- See: Velletri (suburbicarian see)

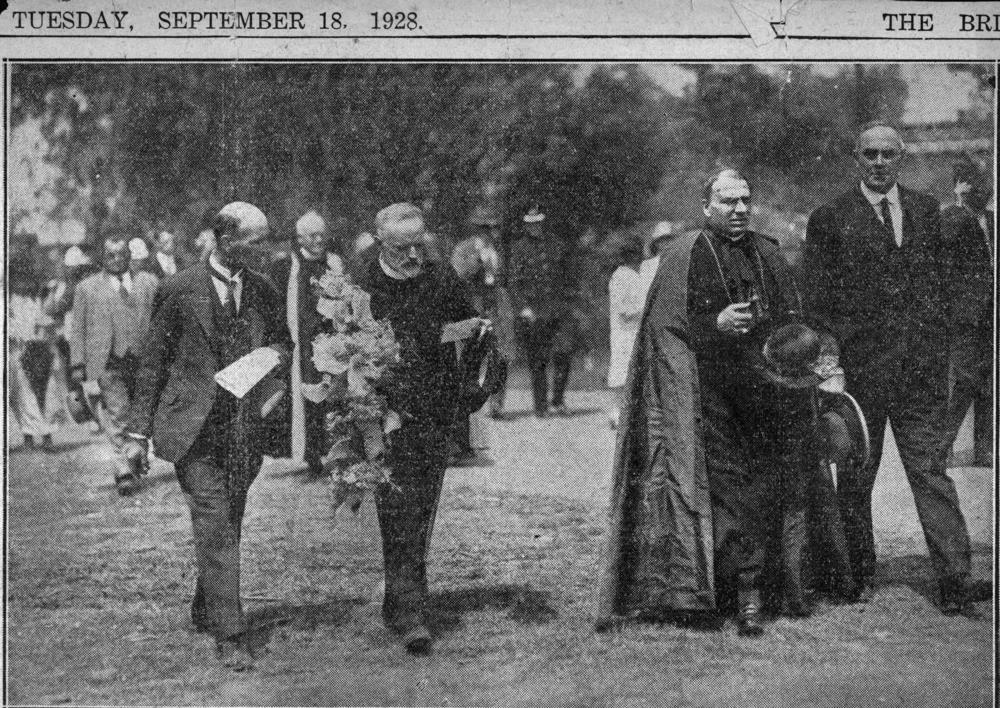
Cardinal Cerretti (in robe) with Queensland Premier William McCormack, about to place a wreath at Toowong Cemetery, Brisbane, 17 September 1928

Bonaventura Cerretti (17 June 1872 – 8 May 1933) was an Italian cardinal of the Roman Catholic Church. He served as Prefect of the Supreme Tribunal of the Apostolic Signatura from 1931 until his death, and was elevated to the cardinalate in 1925.

== Biography ==
Bonaventura Cerretti was born in Orvieto and educated at the seminary in Spoleto and, later, at the Pontifical Gregorian University in Rome as well as the Royal University, Rome. He was ordained in 1895, and taught Latin and Italian classics at the Vatican Seminary. He was then invited to become a staff member in the Vatican Secretariat of State where he worked from 1899 until 1904. He was created Privy chamberlain of His Holiness on 13 January 1904. He then served as secretary to the apostolic delegate in Mexico from 1904 to 1906, then as auditor in the apostolic delegation to the United States from 1906 to 1914. Cerretti contributed the article "Legate" to the Catholic Encyclopedia.

He was appointed as Titular Archbishop of Philippopolis in Thracia on 15 April 1914 by Pope Pius X. He was transferred to the titular see of Corinth on 10 May 1914. He was consecrated as a bishop on 19 July 1914 by Cardinal Rafael Merry del Val, Cardinal Secretary of State. He was appointed as the first apostolic delegate to Australia—the delegation then responsible for Australia and New Zealand—on 10 May 1914, and was well liked and respected by Australians of all faiths. On 6 May 1917, he was assigned to the Congregation for Extraordinary Ecclesiastical Affairs in Rome.

He represented the Holy See at the Paris Peace Conference from May to June 1919; he tried without success to get the Great Powers to accept a set of principles for peace proposed by Pope Benedict XV. He was appointed to serve as Apostolic Nuncio to France in 1921.

In 1925, he was made Cardinal-Priest of Santa Cecilia in Trastevere by Pope Pius XI in the consistory of 14 December 1925. In 1928, he revisited Australia as papal legate to the 29th International Eucharistic Congress in Sydney; as part of this visit, he laid the foundation stone for the Holy Name Cathedral, Brisbane (which was never completed).

In 1926, he negotiated with Aristide Briand an agreement giving the French interior and foreign ministers a role in the appointment of French diocesan bishops (i.e. outside Alsace-Moselle where special arrangements apply).

He was appointed as archpriest of the Basilica of Saint Mary Major on 16 July 1930. Pope Pius appointed him as Prefect of the Apostolic Signatura on 12 October 1931. He opted for the order of cardinal bishops, taking the suburbicarian see of Velletri in 1933. Camerlengo of the Sacred College of Cardinals, 1933; he died shortly after.

In 1930, in Rome, he was painted by his friend the Swiss-born American artist Adolfo Müller-Ury (1862–1947). The picture is believed to hang in the Palazzo Municipale di Orvieto.

Cerretti died in Rome and was buried in the basilica of Santa Maria in Trastevere. The chapel at St Patrick's Seminary, Manly in Sydney, Australia is named after him.

Monsignor Caesar Cerretti (died February 1936), Canon of St. Peter's, Rome, was a brother.

Catholic Church titles
| Preceded by Vincenzo Vannutelli | Archpriest of the Basilica di Santa Maria Maggiore; 16 July 1930 – 8 May 1933 | Succeeded by Angelo Dolci |
| Preceded by Francesco Ragonesi | Prefect of the Supreme Tribunal of the Apostolic Signatura; 12 October 1931 – 8 May 1933 | Succeeded by Enrico Gasparri |
| Preceded by Basilio Pompili | Cardinal-Bishop of Velletri; 13 March 1933 – 8 May 1933 | Succeeded by Enrico Gasparri |
| Preceded by Luigi Sincero | Camerlengo of the Sacred College of Cardinals; 1933 | Succeeded by Achille Locatelli |
