= Enrico Gasparri =

His Eminence Enrico Gasparri
- Prefect of the Apostolic Signatura
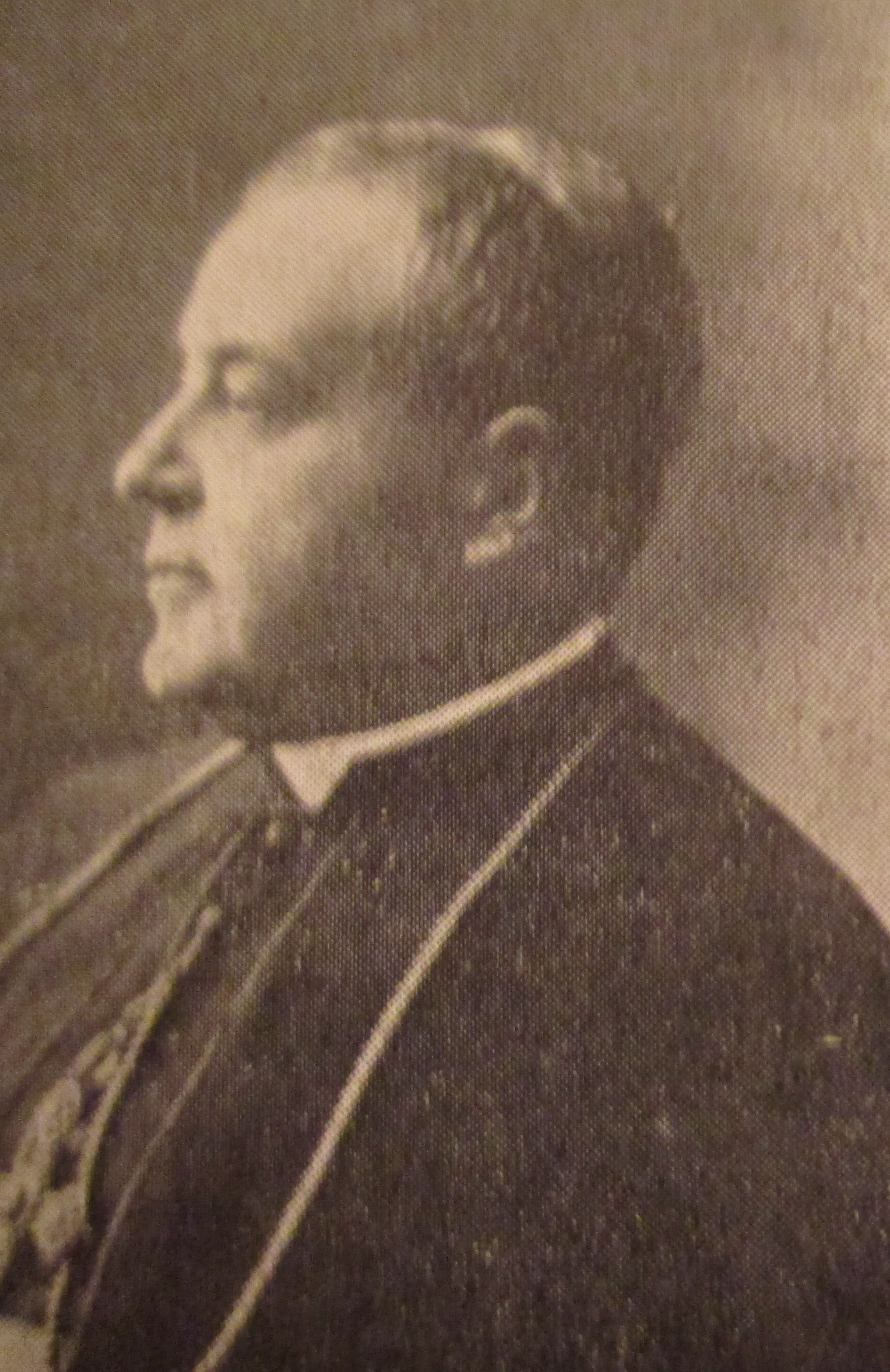
- Church: Roman Catholic Church
- Appointed: 18 May 1933
- Term ended: 20 May 1946
- Predecessor: Bonaventura Cerretti
- Successor: Massimo Massimi
- Other posts: Cardinal-Bishop of Velletri (1933–46); Vice-Dean of the College of Cardinals (1942–46)
- Previous posts: Apostolic Delegate to Colombia (1915–16); Titular Archbishop of Sebastea (1915–25); Apostolic Internuncio to Colombia (1916–17); Apostolic Nuncio to Colombia (1917–20); Apostolic Nuncio to Brazil (1920–25); Cardinal-Priest of San Bartolomeo all'Isola (1925–33)

Orders
- Ordination: 10 August 1894
- Consecration: 12 December 1915 by Vittorio Amadeo Ranuzzi de' Bianchi
- Created cardinal: 14 December 1925 by Pope Pius XI
- Rank: Cardinal-Priest (1925–33); Cardinal-Bishop (1933–46)

Personal details
- Born: Enrico Gasparri; 25 July 1871 Ussita, Norcia, Kingdom of Italy
- Died: 20 May 1946 (aged 74) Rome, Kingdom of Italy
- Education: Pontifical Roman Seminary

Styles of Enrico Gasparri
- Informal style: Cardinal
- See: Velletri (suburbicarian see)

Enrico Gasparri S.T.D. JUD (25 July 1871 – 20 May 1946) was a Roman Catholic Cardinal and Archbishop.

== Biography ==
Enrico was ordained on 10 August 1894, at the age of 23. He studied in Rome receiving degrees in theology and philosophy and worked in Rome in a pastoral role from 1894 until 1898.

He joined the diplomatic service of the Holy See and was working as the auditor in the nunciature to Brazil when, on 14 November 1915, Pope Benedict XV appointed him Titular Archbishop of Sebastea and Apostolic Delegate to Colombia.

On 1 September 1920, Pope Benedict appointed him Nuncio to Brazil.

The appointment ended when on 14 December 1925, he was created Cardinal-Priest of San Bartolomeo all'Isola, at the age of 54. His creation was an exception made to the 1917 Code of Canon Law that forbade anyone having a relative in the Sacred College of Cardinals.

On 18 May 1933, Pope Pius XI appointed him Prefect of the Apostolic Signatura. On 16 October 1933, he was elevated to Cardinal-Bishop of Velletri. He was one of the cardinal electors in the 1939 papal conclave, which selected Pope Pius XII.

He died on 20 May 1946, at the age of 74.

He was the nephew of Cardinal Secretary of State Pietro Gasparri (1852-1934).

Catholic Church titles
Preceded by Bonaventura Cerretti	Prefect of the Supreme Tribunal of the Apostolic Signatura; 18 May 1933 – 20 May 1946	Succeeded by Massimo Massimi
