= Massimo Massimi =

Italian cardinal (1877–1954)

His Eminence Massimo Massimi
- Prefect of the Apostolic Signatura
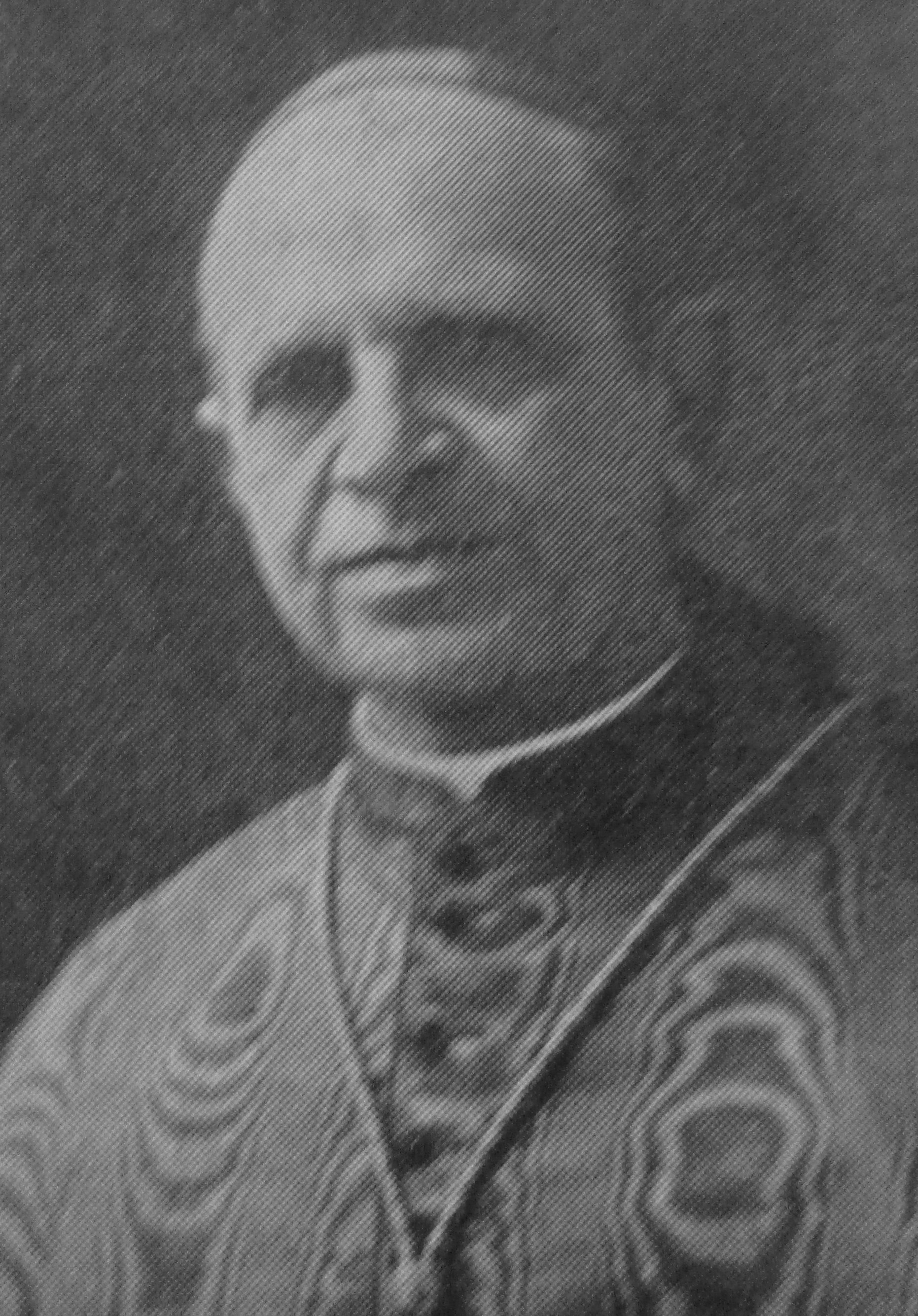
- Massimi in 1939.
- Church: Roman Catholic Church
- Appointed: 29 May 1946
- Term ended: 6 March 1954
- Predecessor: Enrico Gasparri
- Successor: Giuseppe Bruno
- Other posts: President of the Pontifical Commission for the Authentic Interpretation of the Code of Canon Law (1939–54); Cardinal-Priest pro hac vice of Santa Maria in Portico (1946–54)
- Previous posts: Dean of the Roman Rota (1926–35); Cardinal-Deacon of Santa Maria in Portico (1935–46); President of the Pontifical Commission for the Codification of Oriental Canon Law (1936–39)

Orders
- Ordination: 14 April 1900 by Giuseppe Ceppetelli
- Created cardinal: 16 December 1935 by Pope Pius XI
- Rank: Cardinal-deacon (1935–46); Cardinal-priest (1946–54)

Personal details
- Born: Massimo Massimi; 10 April 1877 Rome, Kingdom of Italy
- Died: 6 March 1954 (aged 76) Rome, Italy
- Education: Pontifical Roman Seminary; La Sapienza University
- Motto: Ipsa duce

Styles of Massimo Massimi
- Reference style: His Eminence
- Spoken style: Your Eminence
- Informal style: Cardinal
- See: none

Massimo Massimi (10 April 1877 – 6 March 1954) was an Italian cardinal of the Roman Catholic Church who served as Prefect of the Apostolic Signatura in the Roman Curia from 1946 until his death, and was elevated to the cardinalate in 1935.

== Biography ==
Massimi was born in Rome to Prospero Massimi, a lawyer, and his wife Luisa Guerra. Baptized in the church of Santa Maria in Portico, he studied at the Pontifical Roman Seminary, obtaining doctorates in theology and canon law alongside Eugenio Pacelli, the future Pope Pius XII. He then attended the University of Rome, earning a doctorate in civil law. Massimi was ordained a priest by Archbishop Giuseppe Ceppetelli on 14 April 1900 in the Lateran Basilica.

While doing pastoral work in Rome until 1908, he was named a professor at the "Institutions of Civil Law" of the Pontifical Roman Athenaeum S. Apollinare on 18 November 1904. He joined the Roman Curia on 20 October 1908 as a Promoter of Justice in the Roman Rota. Raised to the rank of Privy Chamberlain of His Holiness on 18 May 1911, Massimi was made auditor (29 November 1915), pro-dean (19 February 1924), and dean (1 May 1926) of the Roman Rota.

On 21 September 1932, Massimi was appointed president of the commission that was to draw up a project of law on the judicial and procedural regulations of the tribunal of Vatican City. Pope Pius XI made him Cardinal-Deacon of Santa Maria in Portico in the consistory of 16 December 1935. Massimi was appointed President of the Pontifical Commission for the Codification of Oriental Canon Law on 17 February 1936.

He served as a cardinal elector in the 1939 papal conclave that elected Pope Pius XII. Pope Pius named him President of the Pontifical Commission for the Interpretation of the Code of Canon Law on 14 March 1939.

After ten years as a cardinal deacon, Massimi opted for the order of cardinal priests on 18 February 1946. Pius XII made him prefect of the Apostolic Signatura, the highest judicial authority in the church below the Pope himself, on 29 May 1946.

Cardinal Massimi died in Rome. Originally buried at the Campo Verano, his remains were transferred in October 1976 to the church of Santa Maria in Portico, which had been both the church of his baptism and his titular church.

Preceded by Giovanni Prior	Dean of the Roman Rota; 1926–1935	Succeeded by Giulio Grazioli
Preceded by Luigi Sincero	Pontifical Commission for the Interpretation of the Code of Canon Law; 1939–1946	Succeeded by Pietro Ciriaci
Preceded by Enrico Gasparri	Prefect of the Apostolic Signatura; 1946–1954	Succeeded by Giuseppe Bruno
