= 1939 conclave =

Election of Catholic Pope Pius XII

Papal conclave March 1939

Dates and location
- 1–2 March 1939; Sistine Chapel, Apostolic Palace, Vatican City

Key officials
- Dean: Gennaro di Belmonte
- Sub-dean: Donato Sbarretti
- Camerlengo: Eugenio Pacelli
- Protopriest: William Henry O'Connell
- Protodeacon: Camillo Caccia Dominioni
- Secretary: Vincenzo Santoro

Election
- Electors: 62 (list)
- Candidates: See papabili
- Ballots: 3

Elected pope
- Eugenio Pacelli; Name taken: Pius XII
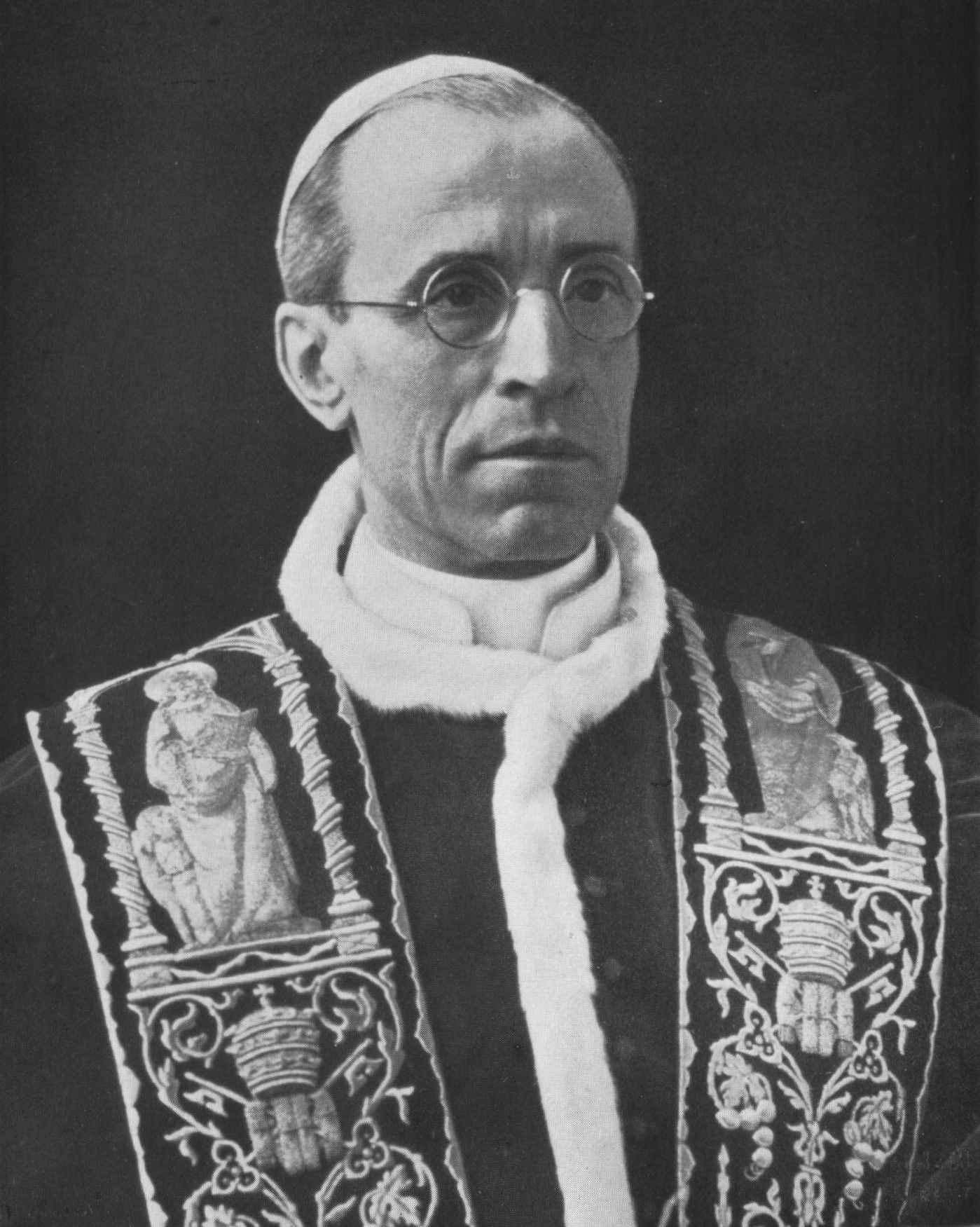

A conclave was held on 1 and 2 March 1939 to elect a new pope to succeed Pius XI, who had died on 10 February. All 62 members of the College of Cardinals attended. (Note: The current 80-year-old age limit for cardinal electors was introduced by Pope Paul VI in 1970.) On the third ballot, the conclave elected Cardinal Eugenio Pacelli, the camerlengo of the Apostolic Chamber and cardinal secretary of state. After accepting his election, he took the name Pius XII.

The 1939 conclave was the shortest in the 20th century, lasting only 2 days. It was the last conclave to include all living cardinals, and the first conclave since the Middle Ages to include a cardinal from the Middle East: Cardinal Ignatius Gabriel I Tappouni of Syria.

Elected pope on his 63rd birthday, Pacelli was the first pope born in Rome since Innocent XIII in 1721 and the first member of the Curia to become pope since Leo XIII in 1878. Another Curial cardinal would not be elected pope until the 2005 conclave (with the election of Cardinal Joseph Ratzinger, who then took the name Benedict XVI).

== Papabili ==
Time magazine announced that likely contenders for the papacy included August Hlond of Gniezno-Poznań, Karl Joseph Schulte of Cologne, the Curia veteran Eugène Tisserant, Ildefonso Schuster of Milan, Adeodato Giovanni Piazza of Venice, Maurilio Fossati of Turin, and Eugenio Pacelli, a longtime diplomat in the service of the Holy See. The prospect of a non-Italian pope for the first time since Adrian VI in 1522 was considered more likely than in previous conclaves. On 13 February, The New York Times dismissed the idea of a non-Italian given the current state of international hostilities, though it thought Jean-Marie-Rodrigue Villeneuve of Quebec the least objectionable to the contending powers. It discounted Pacelli, since there was no precedent for the election of the secretary of state, and precedent argued against the election of any member of the Curia, as well as three key Italians who were members of religious orders. The five Italians remaining were diocesan cardinals Alessio Ascalesi of Naples, Giovanni Nasalli Rocca di Corneliano of Bologna, Luigi Lavitrano of Palermo, Maurilio Fossati of Turin, and Elia Dalla Costa of Florence. By 20 February, the paper found greater interest in the curial cardinals, Francesco Marmaggi, Massimo Massimi, and Luigi Maglione.

Pacelli was, however, heavily favored among the cardinals to win. Pius XI had hinted that he favored Pacelli as his successor. On 15 December 1937, during his last consistory, Pius XI strongly hinted to the cardinals that he expected Pacelli to be his successor, saying "He is in your midst." He had previously been quoted as saying: "When today the Pope dies, you'll get another one tomorrow, because the Church continues. It would be a much bigger tragedy, if Cardinal Pacelli dies, because there is only one. I pray every day, God may send another one into one of our seminaries, but as of today, there is only one in this world."

Like Pius X, Pius XI had been a blunt-spoken, no-nonsense pontiff. Assembling in 1939, as the outbreak of hostilities that became the Second World War was widely anticipated, the cardinals turned swiftly to Pacelli, a soft-spoken Vatican diplomat.

== Balloting ==
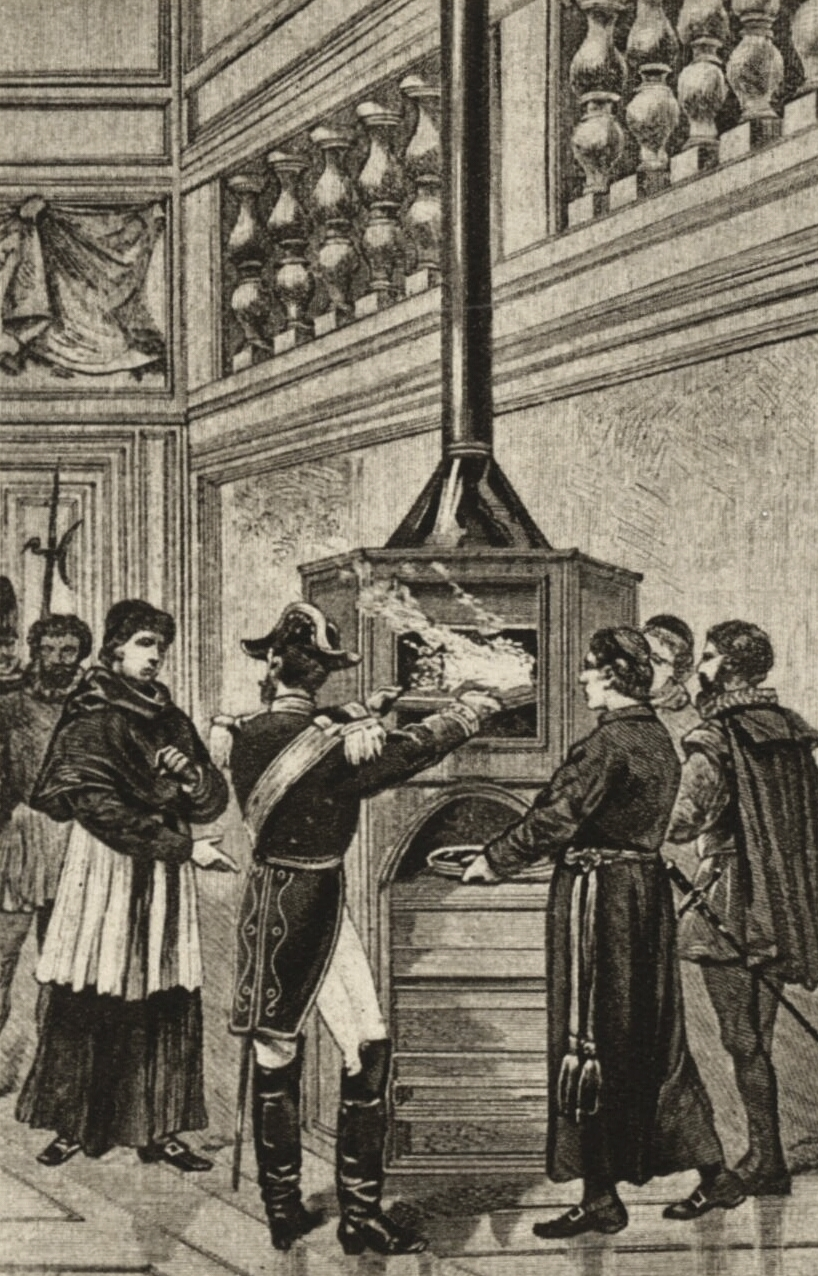
Illustration of the burning of ballots

Pacelli, in his role as camerlengo, announced on 10 February that the College would wait the maximum time allowed, eighteen days from the death of the pope, to start the conclave. The time period before starting had been lengthened following the previous conclave, for which three North American cardinals had arrived too late to participate. When the 31 cardinals available discussed the question on 11 February, they amended his plan only to provide that they would start earlier if all those who planned to attend had arrived in Rome. The cardinals arrived slowly in Rome, with just 37 attending the papal funeral on 14 February, and 46 at a funeral Mass on 18 February. By 20 February, starting the conclave on 28 February appeared to be a possibility, as only three non-Italians had yet to arrive: William Henry O'Connell of Boston, Sebastião da Silveira Cintra of Rio de Janeiro, and Santiago Copello of Buenos Aires. On 22 February, the cardinals sitting in general congregation settled on 1 March, expecting the three to arrive at Naples on the S.S. Neptunia on that morning.

The conclave was held as per tradition in the Sistine Chapel in the Apostolic Palace. All the cardinals attended, 35 Italians and 27 from other countries. The doors closed at 6:17 pm.

Pacelli won a narrow victory on just the second ballot with the lowest possible two-thirds majority, 42 out of 62. He then asked for an additional ballot to confirm his election by a larger margin. (Note: Another account says he received 41 votes on the second ballot. Another adds that Pacelli's ballot was examined after the second ballot to establish that he had not voted for himself.) To the question posed by the presiding cardinal "Acceptasne electionem de te canonice factam in Summum Pontificem?", Pacelli replied "Accepto in crucem" ("I accept it as a cross"). He explained his choice of Pius XII by saying, "I call myself Pius; my whole life was under popes with this name, but especially as a sign of gratitude towards Pius XI."

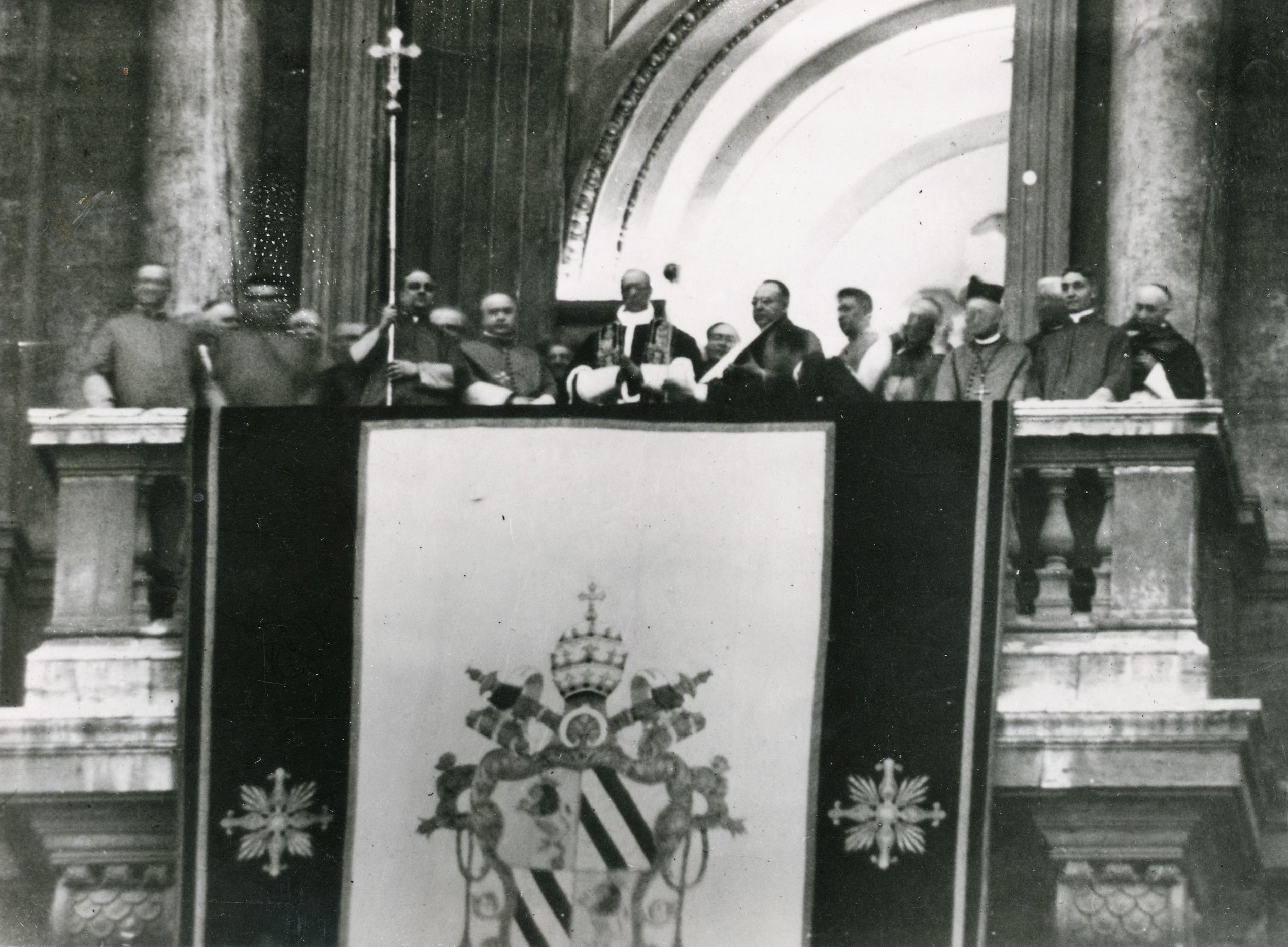
Pope Pius XII on the central loggia of St. Peter's Basilica following his election

The white smoke signifying a successful election appeared at 5:30 pm on 2 March, but began to turn black. Vincenzo Santoro, the conclave secretary, then sent a note to Vatican Radio to confirm that the smoke was white and Pacelli had been elected. At 6:06 pm, the protodeacon, Cardinal Camillo Caccia-Dominioni, made the Habemus papam announcement in Latin from the balcony of St. Peter's Basilica. He said that the new pope had chosen the name Pius but did not mention the ordinal "the twelfth". The crowd below in St. Peter's Square began to sing the hymn Christus Vincit.

== New regulations ==
Pius XII had been narrowly elected pope before seeking an additional ballot to demonstrate wider support, and he knew that a very close ballot in the 1914 conclave had raised the question of the impact of a cardinal's vote for himself. Pius XII promulgated the apostolic constitution Vacantis Apostolicae Sedis on 8 December 1945, more than six years after his election. He made only two significant changes in conclave procedures, otherwise following those established by Pius X on 25 December 1904 with the constitution Vacante Sede Apostolica. Firstly, he increased the majority required for election from two-thirds of those voting to two-thirds plus one, so that an elector's vote for himself would be insufficient to produce a two-thirds majority. He also eliminated the rule against voting for oneself, which the two-thirds-plus-one rule obviated. It holds, though, that if one had an exact two-thirds majority, not counting one's own vote, a cardinal could cast the deciding vote for himself. Secondly, from 1621 to 1945, the ballots were signed with folded over flaps to conceal the signatures of the electors. Prior to 1621, the ballots were signed at the top or in the upper left corner. Pius XII entirely removed the signature portion of the new form of ballot, so that a completely secret ballot is now cast by each elector with the oath taken at the same moment, now being anonymous. All this is clearly stated in the apostolic constitution Vacantis Apostolicae Sedis promulgated by Pius XII on 8 December 1945.

== See also ==
Cardinal electors by region
Region	Number
Italy	35
Rest of Europe	20
North America	4
South America	2
Asia	1
Oceania	0
Africa	0
Total	62

- Cardinal electors for the 1939 conclave
