= Dicastery for the Clergy =

Roman Catholic administrative organization

- Dicasterium pro Clericis
- Coat of arms of the Holy See

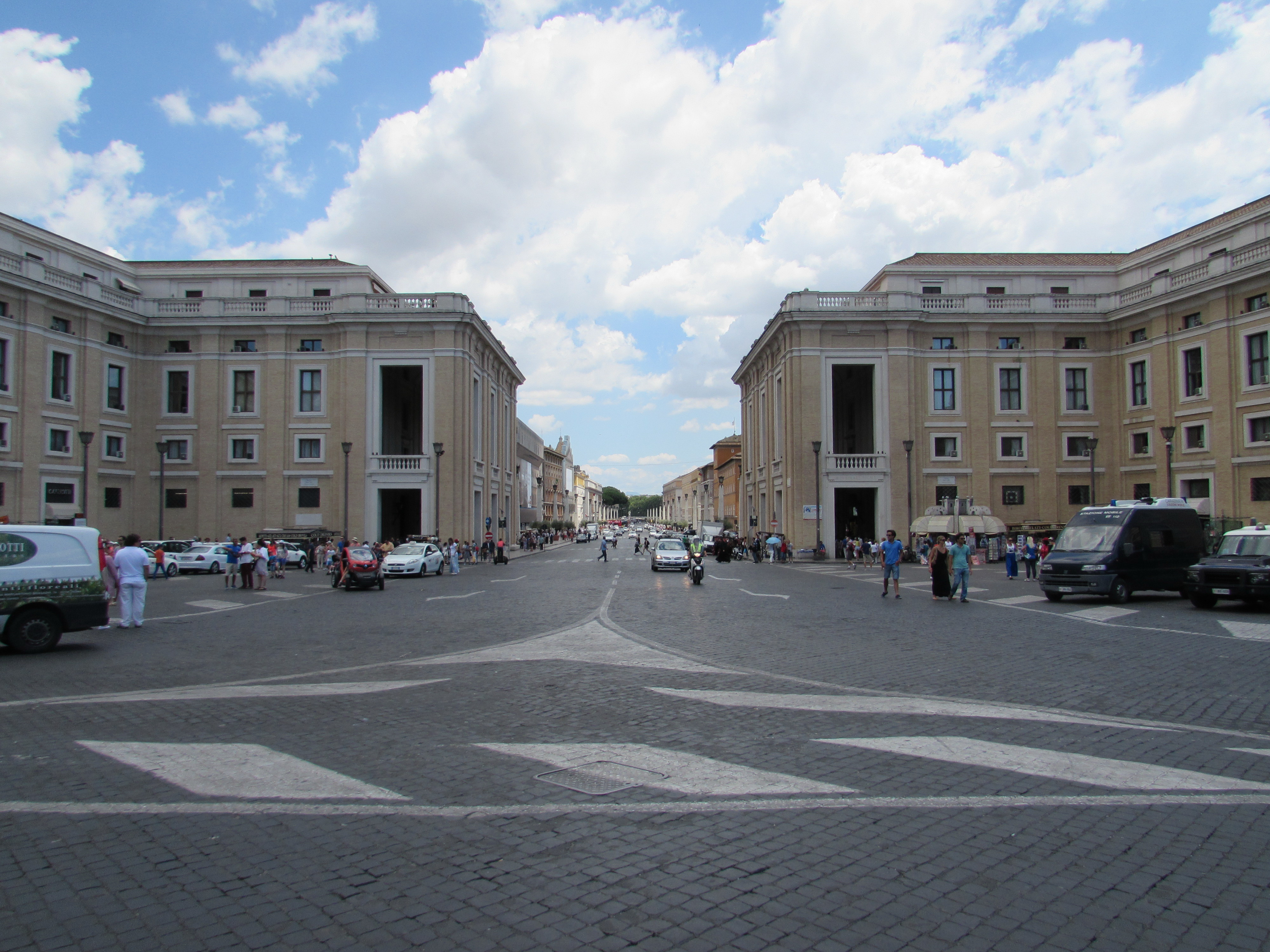
- Palazzo delle Congregazioni in Piazza Pio XII in front of St. Peter's Square is the workplace for most congregations of the Roman Curia

Dicastery overview
- Formed: August 2, 1564; 462 years ago
- Preceding agencies: Sacred Congregation for the Clergy; Sacred Congregation of the Council; Congregation for the Clergy
- Type: Dicastery
- Headquarters: Palazzo delle Congregazioni, Piazza Pio XII, Rome, Italy
- Dicastery executives: Lazarus You Heung-sik, Prefect; Carlo Roberto Maria Redaelli, Secretary; Simone Renna, Under secretary
- Website: http://www.clerus.va

The Dicastery for the Clergy, formerly named Congregation for the Clergy (Latin: Congregatio pro Clericis; formerly the Sacred Congregation for the Clergy and Sacred Congregation of the Council), is the dicastery of the Roman Curia responsible for overseeing matters regarding priests and deacons not belonging to religious orders. The Congregation for the Clergy handles requests for dispensation from active priestly ministry, as well as the legislation governing presbyteral councils and other organisations of priests around the world. The Congregation does not deal with clerical sexual abuse cases, as those are handled exclusively by the Dicastery for the Doctrine of the Faith.

== History ==
=== Sacred Congregation of the Council ===
What is now the Dicastery for the Clergy was first set up as the Sacra Congregatio Cardinalium pro executione et interpretatione concilii Tridentini interpretum by Pope Pius IV in the apostolic constitution Alias Nos of 2 August 1564 to oversee the proper application and observation of the disciplinary decrees of the Council of Trent throughout the Catholic Church. This body was commonly known as the Sacred Congregation of the Council. Cardinal Charles Borromeo was named at the first prefect of the Congregation.

Pope Sixtus V's Apostolic Constitution Immensa aeterni Dei of 22 January 1587 expanded the Congregation's functions, entrusting it with the proper interpretation of the canons of the Council of Trent, resolving controversial questions relating to it, and monitoring provincial councils.

=== Later developments ===
The Sacred Congregation of the Council lost many of its powers, retaining only those relating to disciplining secular clergy, but still held onto its original name until Pope Paul VI's apostolic constitution Regimini Ecclesiae Universae of 31 December 1967 renamed it as the "Congregation for the Clergy".

By 2009, Pope Benedict XVI made the Congregation responsible for managing the guidelines concerning clergy who maintained their clerical status after violating their vows of celibacy. On 25 January 2012, Pope Benedict XVI gave it responsibility for regulating Catholic seminaries, which until then were the responsibility of the Congregation for Catholic Education.

In January 2013, the motu proprio Fides per doctrinam transferred the competency on catechesis from the Congregation for the Clergy to the Pontifical Council for the Promotion of the New Evangelisation.

In February 2019, Cardinal Beniamino Stella, Prefect of the Congregation, said that the Congregation manages the cases of priests who violate their vows of celibacy for approximately ten years. He said that "In such cases there are, unfortunately, Bishops and Superiors who think that, after having provided economically for the children, or after having transferred the priest, the cleric could continue to exercise the ministry." In February 2020, the Congregation made public its guidelines for managing cases of priests who have fathered children. The guidelines were previously secret, though in 2019 the Congregation offered to provide then to a bishops conference upon request.

On 3 June 2021, Pope Francis tasked Egidio Miragoli, Bishop of Mondovì, with conducting a review of the Congregation in anticipation of the replacement of its prefect in August. He expected it would take at least the month of June to complete.

== Leadership ==
Prefect of Congregation for the Clergy
- Coat of arms of the Holy See

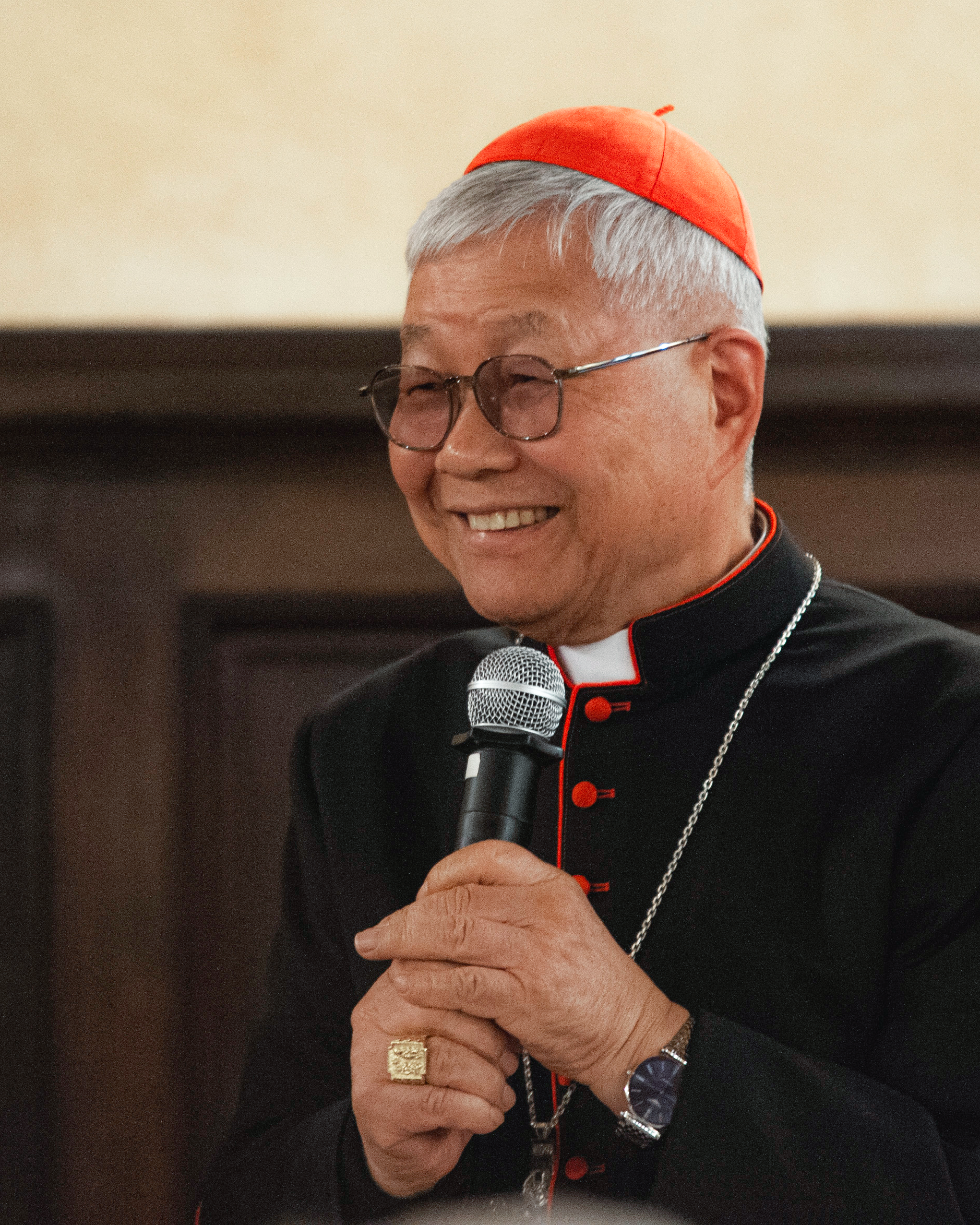
- Incumbent; Lazarus You Heung-sik since 2021
- Congregation for the Clergy
- Style: His Excellency
- Member of: Roman Curia
- Reports to: The Pope
- Appointer: The Pope
- Term length: Five years, renewable
- First holder: Carlo Borromeo

Since 2 August 2021, the prefect of the Congregation has been Archbishop Lazarus You Heung-sik. The secretary of the Congregation has been the Archbishop Carlo Roberto Maria Redaelli since January 2026. In February 2022, Simone Renna was named under secretary.

=== Prefects ===
No.	Name	From	Until	Appointer
1	Carlo Borromeo	1564	1565	Pius IV
2	Francesco Alciati	1565	1580	
3	Filippo Boncompagni	1580	1586	Gregory XIII
4	Antonio Carafa	1586	1591	Sixtus V
5	Girolamo Mattei	1591	1603	
6	Paolo Emilio Zacchia	1604	1605	Clement VIII
7	Francesco Maria del Monte	1606	1616	Paul V
8	Orazio Lancellotti	1616	1620	Paul V
9	Roberto Ubaldini	1621	1623	
10	Cosimo de Torres	1623	1626	
11	Bonifazio Bevilacqua; Aldobrandini	1626	1627	Urban VIII
12	Fabrizio Verospi	1627	1639	Urban VIII
13	Giambattista Pamphilj	1639	1644	Urban VIII
14	Francesco Cennini de' Salamandri	1644	1645	
15	Pier Luigi Carafa	1645	1655	Innocent X
16	Francesco Paolucci	1657	1661	
17	Giulio Cesare Sacchetti	1661	1663	Alexander VII
18	Angelo Celsi	1664	1671	Alexander VII
19	Paluzzo Paluzzi Altieri degli Albertoni	1671	1672	Clement X
20	Vincenzo Maria Orsini, O.P.	1673	1675	Clement X
21	Federico Baldeschi Colonna	1675	1691	Clement X
22	Galeazzo Marescotti	1692	1695	Innocent XII
23	Giuseppe Sacripante	1696	1700	Innocent XII
24	Bandino Panciatichi	1700	1718	
25	Pier Marcellino Corradini	1718	1721	Clement XI
26	Curzio Origo	1721	1737	
27	Antonio Saverio Gentili	1737	1753	Clement XII
28	Mario Millini	1753	1756	Benedict XIV
29	Giovanni Giacomo Millo	1756	1757	Benedict XIV
30	Clemente Argenvilliers	1757	1758	Benedict XIV
31	Ferdinando Maria de' Rossi	1759	1775	Clement XIII
32	Carlo Vittorio Amedeo delle Lanze	1775	1784	
33	Guglielmo Pallotta	1785	1795	Pius VI
34	Tommaso Antici	1795	1798	Pius VI
35	Filippo Carandini	1800	1810	
36	Giulio Gabrielli	1814	1820	Pius VII
37	Emmanuele De Gregorio	1820	1834	Pius VII
38	Vincenzo Macchi	1834	1841	Gregory XVI
39	Paolo Polidori	1841	1847	Gregory XVI
40	Pietro Ostini	1847	1849	Pius IX
41	Angelo Mai	1851	1853	Pius IX
42	Antonio Maria Cagiano de Azevedo	1853	1860	Pius IX
43	Prospero Caterini	1860	1881	Pius IX
44	Lorenzo Nina	1881	1885	Leo XIII
45	Luigi Serafini	1885	1893	Leo XIII
46	Angelo Di Pietro	1893	1902	Leo XIII
47	Vincenzo Vannutelli	1902	1908	Leo XIII
48	Casimiro Gennari	1908	1914	Pius X
49	Francesco di Paola Cassetta	1914	1919	
50	Donato Raffaele Sbarretti	1919	1930	Benedict XV
51	Giulio Serafini	1930	1938	Pius XI
52	Luigi Maglione	1938	1939	Pius XI
53	Francesco Marmaggi	1939	1949	
54	Giuseppe Bruno	1949	1954	Pius XII
55	Pietro Ciriaci	1954	1966	Pius XII
56	Jean-Marie Villot	1967	1969	
57	John Joseph Wright	1969	1979	Paul VI
58	Silvio Oddi	1979	1986	John Paul II
59	Antonio Innocenti	1986	1991	John Paul II
60	José Tomás Sánchez	1991	1996	John Paul II
61	Darío Castrillón Hoyos	1996; Pro-Prefect	1998	John Paul II
61	Darío Castrillón Hoyos	1998; Prefect	2006	John Paul II
62	Cláudio Hummes	2006	2010	Benedict XVI
63	Mauro Piacenza	2010	2013	Benedict XVI
64	Beniamino Stella	2013	2021	Francis
65	Lazarus You Heung-sik	2021	present	Francis

== Documents ==
- General Directory for Catechesis
