= Administration of the Property of the Holy See =

Former Vatican commission

Administration of the Property of the Holy See (Italian: Amministrazione dei Beni della Santa Sede, abbreviated ABSS) was a commission that, until 1967, administered the property of the Holy See other than the money in cash and Italian government bonds received when the Financial Convention attached to the Lateran Treaty of 1929 was implemented.

Its origin lay in the decision of Pope Leo XIII on 9 August 1878 to appoint his then Secretary of State also as Prefect of the Sacred Palace and Administrator of the patrimony remaining to the Holy See after the complete loss of the Papal States in 1870. In 1891 he entrusted the management of the patrimony of the Holy See to a commission of cardinals, already set up to supervise, but not manage, the administration of Peter's Pence and of the patrimony of the Holy See. On 16 December 1926, Pope Pius XI united with this commission the Prefecture of the Sacred Palace and the Section of the Departments of the Church.

On 15 August 1967, Pope Paul VI combined the Special Administration of the Holy See and the Administration of the Property of the Holy See into one office, the Administration of the Patrimony of the Apostolic See.

== Bibliography ==
- Pollard, John F. (2005). Money and the Rise of the Modern Papacy: Financing the Vatican, 1850–1950. Cambridge University Press.
- Malachi Martin - Rich Church, Poor Church (Putnam, New York, 1984) ISBN 0-399-12906-5
