= Achille Locatelli =

His Eminence Achille Locatelli
- Cardinal-Priest of San Bernardo alle Terme
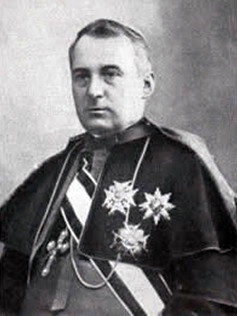
- Church: Roman Catholic Church
- Appointed: 25 May 1923
- Term ended: 5 April 1935
- Predecessor: Giovanni Cagliero
- Successor: Alfred-Henri-Marie Baudrillart
- Other post: Camerlengo of the College of Cardinals (1933–35)
- Previous posts: Apostolic Internuncio to Argentina (1906–16); Titular Archbishop of Thessalonica (1906–23); Apostolic Nuncio to Belgium (1916–18); Apostolic Internuncio to Luxembourg (1916–18); Apostolic Internuncio to the Netherlands (1916–18); Apostolic Nuncio to Portugal (1918–22); Apostolic Pro-Nuncio to Portugal (1922–23); Camerlengo of the College of Cardinals (1929–30)

Orders
- Ordination: 20 December 1879
- Consecration: 27 December 1906 by Rafael Merry del Val y Zulueta
- Created cardinal: 11 December 1922 by Pope Pius XI
- Rank: Cardinal-Priest

Personal details
- Born: Achille Locatelli; 15 March 1856 Serengo, Milan, Kingdom of Lombardy–Venetia
- Died: 5 April 1935 (aged 79) Rome, Kingdom of Italy
- Education: Pontifical Roman Seminary; Pontifical Academy of Ecclesiastical Nobles

Achille Locatelli (15 March 1856 in Seregno, Milan, Italy – 5 April 1935 in Rome) was a Roman Catholic cardinal. He worked in papal diplomacy, and among other positions, he was nuntius in Argentina, Paraguay, and Uruguay.

He was named Apostolic Nuncio to Belgium on 8 July 1916.

He was appointed Apostolic Nuncio to Portugal on 18 July 1918.

He was made cardinal in 1922 by Pope Pius XI.
