= Francesco Marmaggi =

Italian cardinal (1870–1949)

His Eminence Francesco Marmaggi
- Prefect of the Congregation of the Council
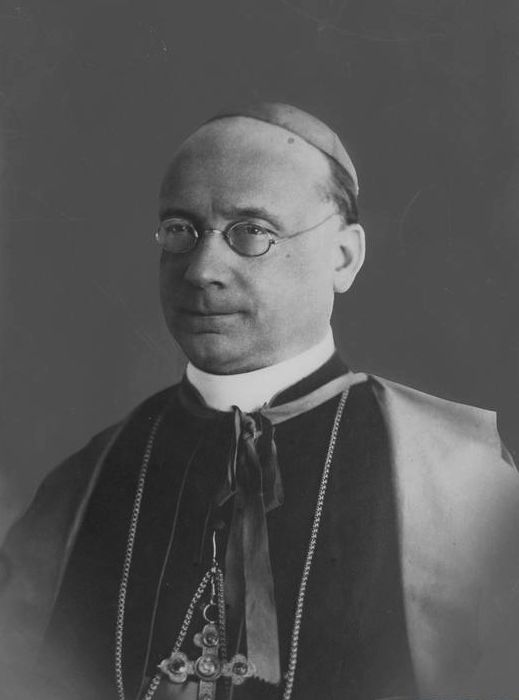
- Church: Roman Catholic Church
- Appointed: 14 March 1939
- Term ended: 3 November 1949
- Predecessor: Luigi Maglione
- Successor: Giuseppe Bruno
- Other post: Cardinal-Priest of Santa Cecilia (1936–49)
- Previous posts: Undersecretary of the Congregation for Extraordinary Ecclesiastical Affairs (1917–20); Apostolic Nuncio to Romania (1920–23); Titular Archbishop of Hadrianopolis in Haemimonto (1920–35); Apostolic Nuncio to Czechoslovakia (1923–28); Apostolic Nuncio to Poland (1928–35); Apostolic Pro-Nuncio to Poland (1935–36)

Orders
- Ordination: 14 April 1900
- Consecration: 26 September 1920 by Pietro Gasparri
- Created cardinal: 16 December 1935 by Pope Pius XI
- Rank: Cardinal-Priest

Personal details
- Born: Francesco Marmaggi; 31 August 1876 Rome, Kingdom of Italy
- Died: 3 November 1949 (aged 73) Rome, Italy
- Buried: Campo Verano (first); Santa Cecilia in Trastevere (current)
- Education: Pontifical Roman Seminary
- Motto: Lux de luce

Styles of Francesco Marmaggi
- Reference style: His Eminence
- Spoken style: Your Eminence
- Informal style: Cardinal
- See: Hadrianopolis in Haemimonto (titular see)

Francesco Marmaggi (31 August 1876 – 3 November 1949) was a Cardinal of the Roman Catholic Church who served as Prefect of the Congregation of the Council and, earlier, as Nuncio in Romania, Czechoslovakia and Poland, as well as being a special envoy to Turkey.

== Biography ==
Marmaggi was born in Rome at a time when the Kingdom of Italy was just coming into being. He was educated at the Pontifical Roman Seminary in the city, earning a doctorates in Philosophy and Theology.

Marmaggi was ordained in Rome, on 14 April 1900, and afterwards worked in pastoral care in the Diocese of Rome, as well as being a faculty member of the Pontifical Roman Athenaeum Sant'Apollinare, and an official in the Apostolic Penitentiary until 1904. He was created Privy Chamberlain of Pope Pius X on 15 November 1907, and reappointed on 7 September 1914. Marmaggi was raised to the level of Domestic Prelate on 2 June 1915.

Pope Benedict XV appointed him Titular Archbishop of Hadrianopolis in Haemimonto and first Nuncio to the Kingdom of Romania on 1 September 1920. The appointment followed a long period of negotiations between Romania and the Papacy and was replicated by the appointment of Dimitrie Pennescu as first Ambassador of Romania to the Holy See. He was consecrated on 26 September by Pietro Gasparri, Cardinal Secretary of State. Marmaggi represented the Pope at the 1922 coronation of Ferdinand I as King of Greater Romania, a ceremony which took place in Alba Iulia.

Marmaggi was named extraordinary envoy to Turkey after the Greco-Turkish War, part of Pope Pius XI's decision to upgrade the papacy's diplomatic relations, which had outlined in the encyclical Pacem Dei Munus Pulcherrimum, breaking with the tradition of ceding to France the role of protector for Middle Eastern Catholics. At the same time, Pope Pius also sent Celso Costantini to establish contacts with the Beiyang Government in China.

Marmaggi was made the second Nuncio to Czechoslovakia in 1923. Two years later, he was recalled to Rome as a sign of protest as a result of several disagreements on both sides, sparked by the Czechoslovak decision to continue celebrating the local festival Den upálení mistra Jana Husa, which honored the 15th-century thinker Jan Hus, who influenced Protestant dogma and was burned at the stake as a heretic. The underlying problem was the fact that hundreds of Catholic places of worship had been seized by the government and assigned to the new Czechoslovak Hussite Church with an openly anti-Catholic purpose.

Marmaggi left Prague on 6 July 1925, after repeatedly warning President Tomáš Masaryk, Premier Antonín Švehla and Foreign Minister Edvard Beneš not to attend the ceremonies. They reportedly argued that they were participating as private persons. Marmaggi's protest was echoed by the Catholic People's Party, which criticized Masaryk. As a result of Marmaggi's departure, Czechoslovakia cut diplomatic ties with the Holy See. Years of negotiations established a new working relationship (the Holy See and the Czech officials reached a temporary agreement only in January 1928), but the Vatican failed to persuade the Czechs to allow Marmaggi to return as nuncio, not even a face-saving few weeks.

Marmaggi then served as Nuncio to Poland from 1928 until he was made Cardinal-Priest of Santa Cecilia in the consistory of 16 December 1935 by Pius XI. Two years later, alongside Cardinals Maglione, Pietro Boetto, Nicola Canali, Mario Nasalli Rocca di Corneliano, Alberto di Jorio, Giovanni Mercati, Raffaele Rossi, Carlo Salotti, Federico Tedeschini and Eugène-Gabriel-Gervais-Laurent Tisserant, he sat on a papal commission analyzing the situation created by the Spanish Civil War and its implications for Roman Catholic clergy in Spain. The body was created because Pope Pius was alarmed by Nationalist leader Francisco Franco's decision to overturn Republican reforms at a time when the zone controlled by Nationalist forces was much smaller than the Republican area.

Marmaggi participated in the conclave of 1939 that elected Pius XII. He left Poland in March 1939, when he was appointed cardinal and Prefect of the Congregation of the Council. Reportedly, he wanted his successor in Poland to be Angelo Giuseppe Roncalli, the Nuncio to Turkey and Greece and future Pope John XXIII.

Marmaggi was Prefect until his death in 1949. A street in Rome was named in his honor "Via Cardinale Marmaggi".

Catholic Church titles
Preceded by Filippo Giustini	Prefect of the Congregation of the Council; 14 March 1939 – 3 November 1949	Succeeded by Domenico Jorio
