= Dicastery for Evangelization =

Administrative department of the Catholic Church

- Dicasterium pro evangelizatione
- Coat of arms of the Holy See

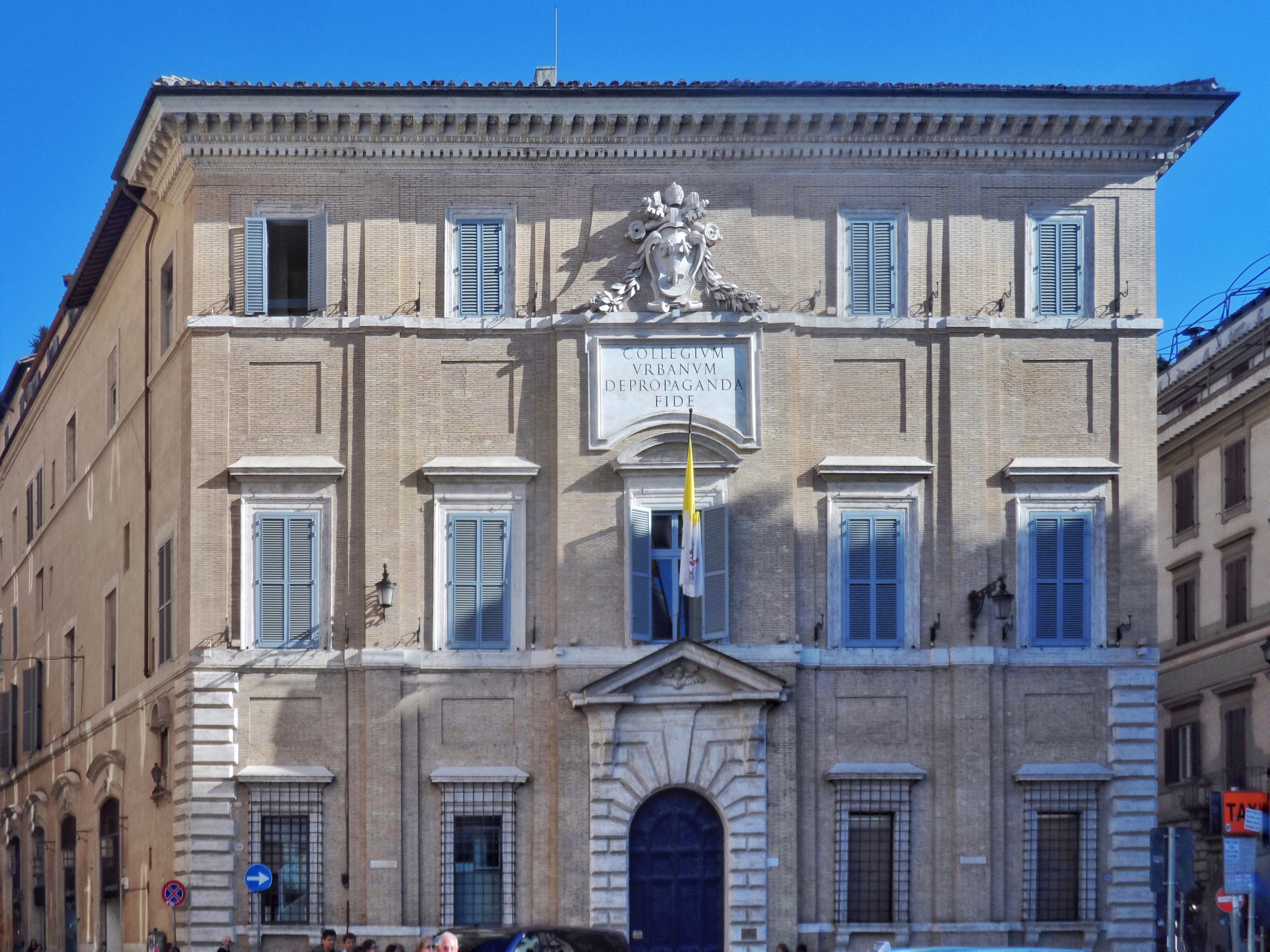
- Palazzo di Propaganda Fide, headquarters of the dicastery in Rome

Dicastery overview
- Formed: June 5, 2022; 4 years ago
- Preceding agencies: Congregation for the Evangelization of Peoples; Pontifical Council for Promoting the New Evangelization
- Type: Dicastery
- Dicastery executives: Pope Leo XIV, prefect; Luis Antonio Tagle, pro-prefect; Rino Fisichella, pro-prefect
- Website: www.evangelizatio.va

The Dicastery for Evangelization is a department (dicastery) of the Roman Curia. It was created on 5 June 2022 by the apostolic constitution Praedicate evangelium, through the merger of the Pontifical Council for Promoting the New Evangelization and the Congregation for the Evangelization of Peoples.

According to Praedicate evangelium, the dicastery serves the work of evangelization and is responsible for fundamental questions regarding evangelization in the world. It is also tasked with the establishment, accompaniment, and support of new particular churches, without prejudice to the competence of the Dicastery for the Eastern Churches.

== Importance ==
In Praedicate evangelium, the Dicastery for Evangelization is listed first among the departments of the Roman Curia. This placement is widely interpreted as indicating its primacy among the dicasteries. For the past 500 years, the Dicastery for the Doctrine of the Faith and its equivalents had traditionally held this position.

During the press conference presenting the apostolic constitution, Bishop Marco Mellino stated that while the order of the dicasteries in Praedicate evangelium has no juridical effect, the sequence of the first three "perhaps" holds significance: evangelization (Dicastery for Evangelization) comes before doctrine (Dicastery for the Doctrine of the Faith), which is closely followed by charity (Dicastery for the Service of Charity).

== Organization ==
The Dicastery for Evangelization was formed through the merger of the Pontifical Council for Promoting the New Evangelization and the Congregation for the Evangelization of Peoples. According to Praedicate evangelium, the dicastery is divided into two sections: one dealing with fundamental questions of evangelization in the world, and the other with first evangelization and the establishment of new particular churches within its territorial competence.

The dicastery is presided over directly by the pope, who serves as its prefect.

== Hierarchy ==
The leadership structure of the Dicastery for Evangelization is unique among the dicasteries of the Roman Curia; Praedicate evangelium stipulates that the incumbent pope serves as its prefect, assisted by two pro-prefects.

=== Prefects ===
- Pope Francis (5 June 2022 – 21 April 2025)
- Pope Leo XIV (8 May 2025 – present)

=== Pro-Prefect for the Section for Fundamental Questions regarding Evangelization in the World ===
- Rino Fisichella (5 June 2022 – present)

=== Pro-Prefect for the Section for First Evangelization and New Particular Churches ===
- Luis Antonio Tagle (5 June 2022 – present)
