= Scholasteria =

Historic building in Tarnów, Poland

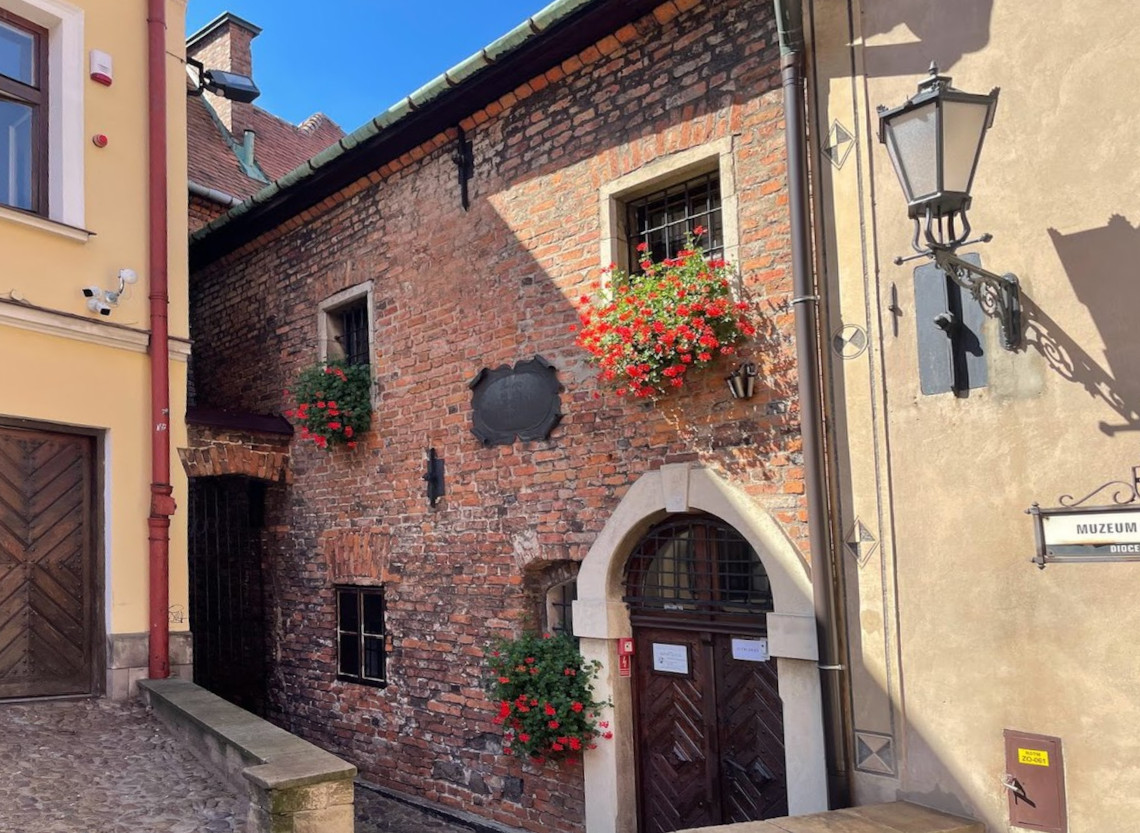
- View of the front facade of the building
- Interactive map of the Scholasteria area

General information
- Type: tenement
- Location: 5 Cathedral Square, Tarnów, Poland
- Coordinates: 50°00′47″N 20°59′12″E
- Construction stopped: 16th century
- Owner: Diocesan Curia in Tarnów

Technical details
- Floor count: 2
- Grounds: 81 m^{2} (870 sq ft)

Scholasteria (also known as the rector's house or chapter house) is a historic building located at 5 Cathedral Square in Tarnów. Built in the second half of the 16th century, it has served various residential purposes throughout its history, including as a residence for the rector of the parish school, the chancellor prelate, and the director of the Austrian gymnasium. Today, it is used by the Tarnów Diocesan Museum.

== Location ==
The building, known as Scholasteria, chapter house, capitular house, or rector's house, is situated in Tarnów's Old Town, in the southwestern corner of Cathedral Square, at 5 Cathedral Square. It is part of the compact development of the western frontage of the square, with its front façade facing approximately east. To the north, it adjoins the Akademiola building.

== History ==
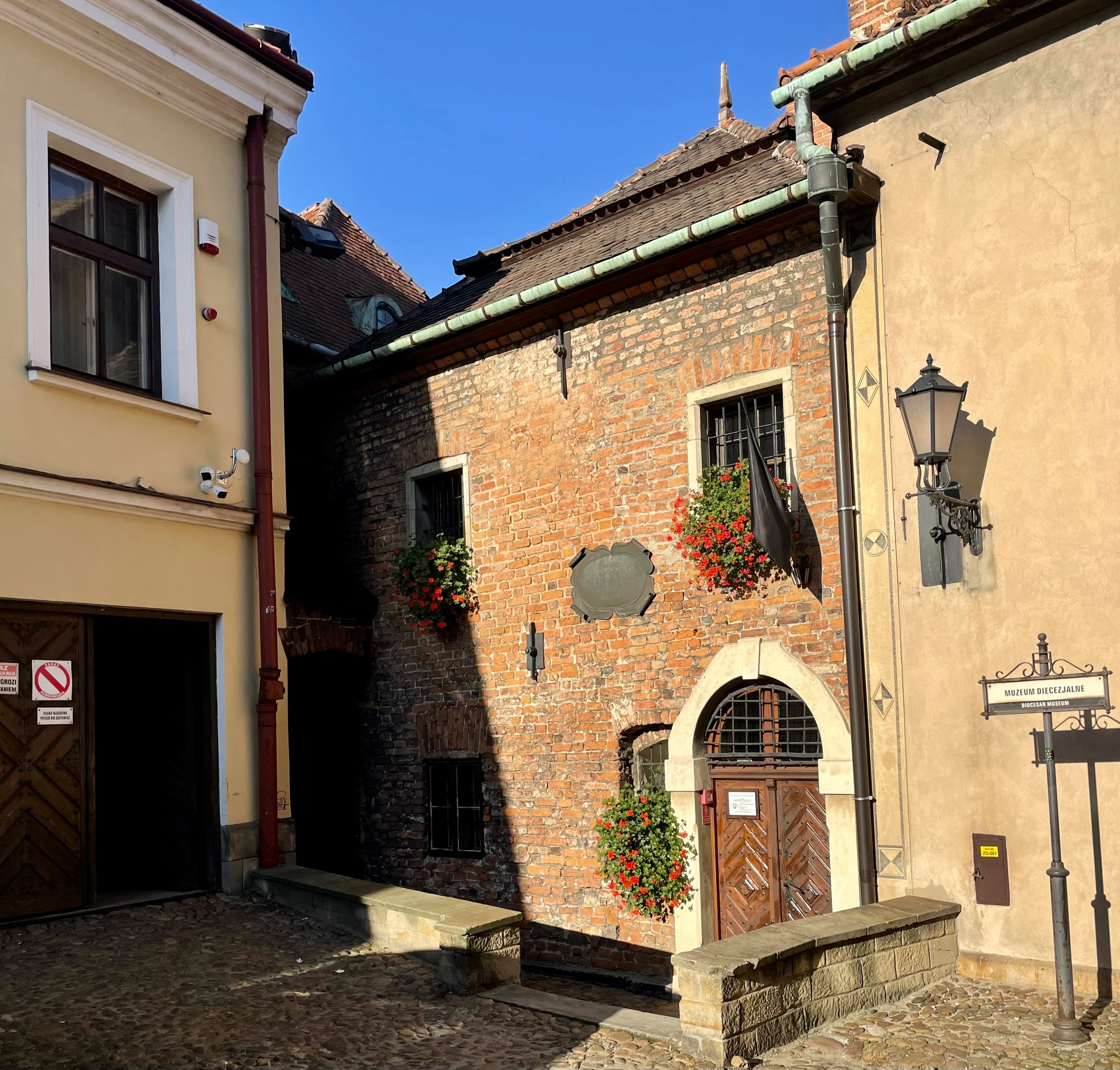
View of the building from the southern part of Cathedral Square

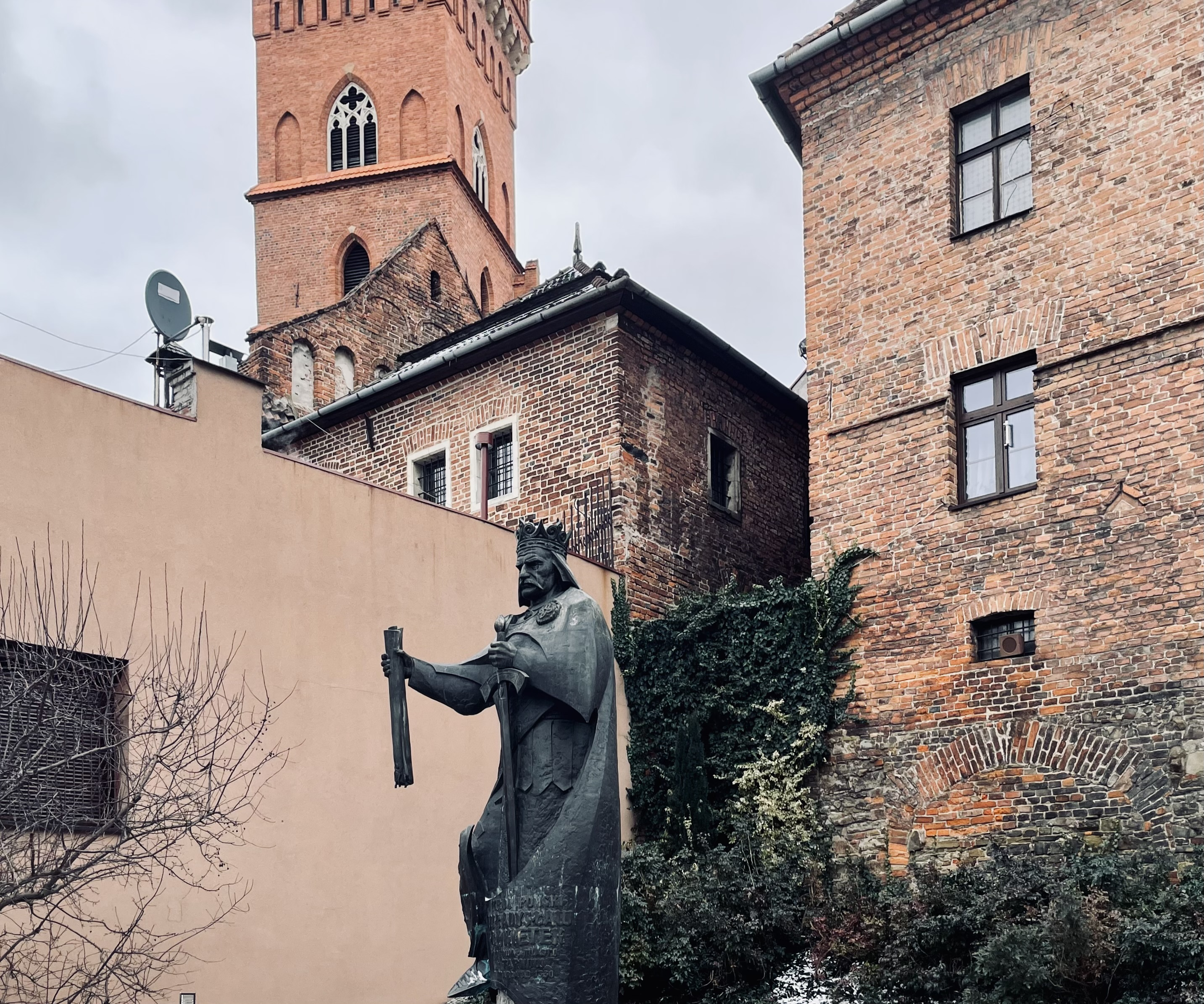
View (left) of the rear and southern facades of Scholasteria

The exact date of the townhouse's construction is unknown. It was built in the second half of the 16th century, presumably between 1559 and 1597, on the site of a previously existing wooden structure. It likely originally served as a residence for the rector of the parish school and, like the neighboring buildings, probably belonged to the Tarnów chapter.

The existence of a brick building referred to as the rector's house was noted in 1597 during the visitation of Cardinal Jerzy Radziwiłł. From the 1680s, the house was designated as the residence of the chancellor prelate. From the 18th century, it was part of the small academy (academic colony) founded by Wojciech Kaszewicz, known as Akademiola, hypothetically serving as housing for students and staff.

After Tarnów was annexed by Austria following the First Partition of Poland, the house was taken over by the Religious Fund. An assessment in 1795 described its technical condition as good. After the academy was dissolved and replaced by an Austrian gymnasium, the building was adapted between 1814 and 1817 to serve as the residence of the school's director. It retained this function until the early 20th century, when educational institutions were relocated from the townhouses around Cathedral Square, and the house itself fell into a state of severe disrepair. Plans were made to renovate it along with the neighboring buildings, but when municipal authorities declared it a ruin in 1903, the plans were abandoned.

During the interwar period, the facade's plaster was removed, revealing the 16th-century brickwork. In 1938, the building was purchased by the Tarnów diocesan curia by decision of Bishop Franciszek Lisowski. During the German occupation in World War II, the curia took measures to protect the building from further deterioration, and in 1944, it was decided that it would be used for the Tarnów Diocesan Museum.

Between 1948 and 1952, the house underwent extensive restoration, which included the installation of a new roof, new ceilings, the reconstruction of door and window openings, and its adaptation for museum purposes.

In 1991, the building was listed in the register of immovable monuments of the former Tarnów Voivodeship (registration number A-338, dated 19 July 1991).

Today, it is used by the Tarnów Diocesan Museum, serving as its main entrance. Among its exhibits is a collection of folk paintings on glass, donated to the museum by Norbert Lippóczy.

== Architecture ==
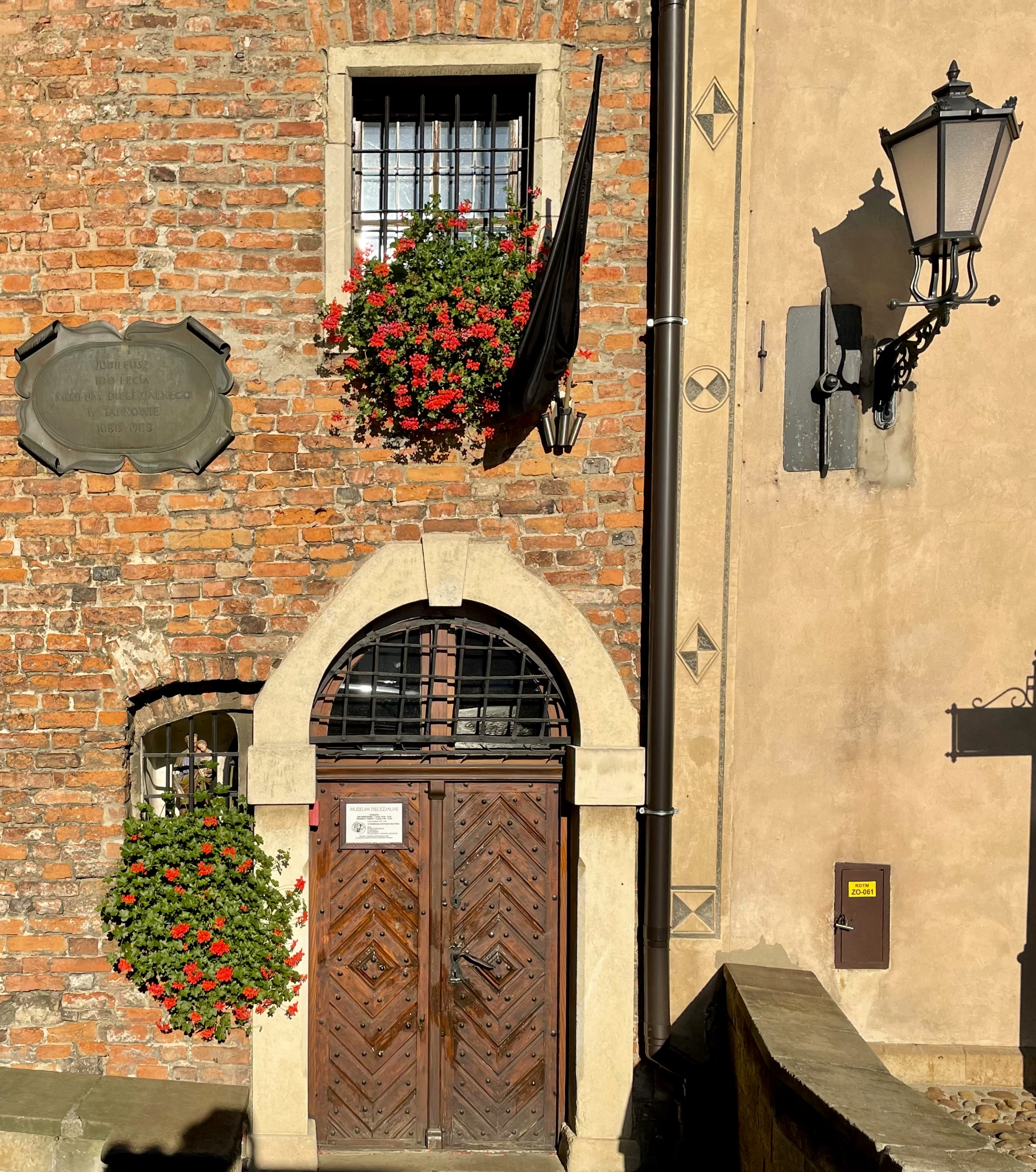
Main entrance to the building

Scholasteria is an example of a 16th-century brick residential building. It is two stories high, has a two-bay layout, and is partially cellared, constructed on a square plan measuring 9.60 × 9 m. The walls are made of bricks arranged in a Gothic-Polish bond, measuring 27 × 13 × 7.5 cm. The portal frames and window openings on the upper floor are made of stone. The tenement is located about 0.5 meters below the contemporary ground level of Cathedral Square, so along its facade runs a narrow moat, supported by a stone retaining wall, paved with cobblestones and stone slabs. It can be accessed from the square via three stone steps located directly in front of the entrance.

Between Scholasteria and the neighboring building that closes the southern side of Cathedral Square, there is a passage, formerly leading beyond the defensive walls, blocked by a gate made of steel rods mounted in a brick, semi-arched lintel stretching between the corners of both buildings.

The cellar of Scholasteria is small and does not cover the entire building. The ground floor consists of an entrance hall, a single-flight wooden staircase, and two interconnected rooms. Additionally, in the entrance hall, there is a passage to the neighboring Akademiola.

The rooms on the ground floor, except for the hall where a groin vault is present, feature preserved barrel vaults. These rooms include, among others, a storage area and a duty room. The floors on the ground floor are made of boards, while the upper-floor rooms have parquet coverings. The rooms on the upper floor are designated for exhibition purposes and have beam ceilings. There is also an attic, but it is not usable.

The rooms of Scholasteria are characterized by their low ceilings and unplastered walls with numerous recesses. Additionally, the rooms contain typical wide window sills as well as masonry heaters.

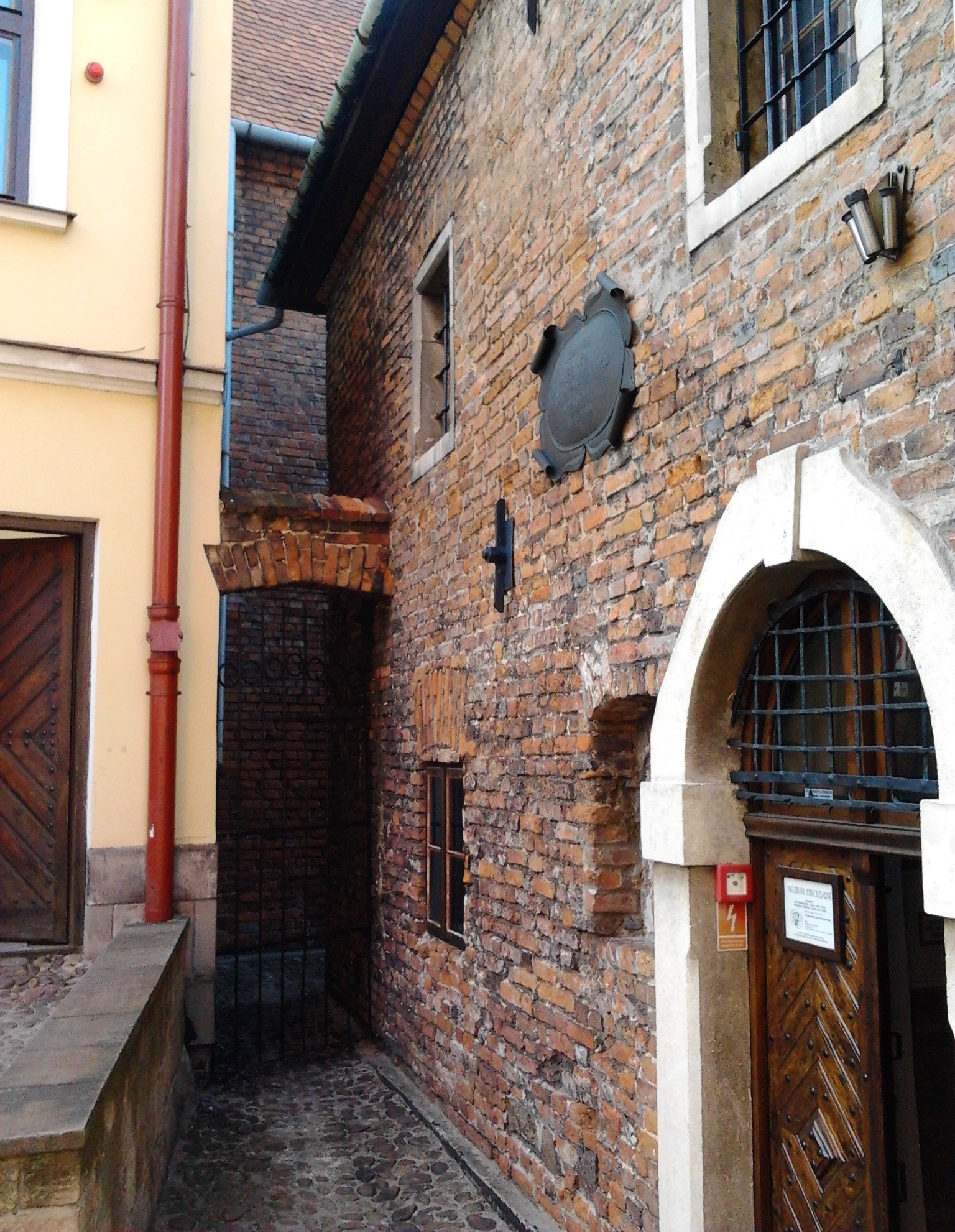
View of the facade and the moat with a retaining wall

The front wall is unplastered, modest, and has two bays. It is devoid of sculptural decoration, and there are no architectural divisions. The ceiling level shows the anchor plates of the tie rods in the wall. To the right of the facade is its main ornament, the entrance portal, which features a smooth stone frame with a rounded arch. The jambs are chamfered, with clearly outlined capitals and foundations. The arch is decorated with a keystone. The portal houses massive wooden doors reinforced with iron studs, separated by a profiled lintel from a semi-circular transom secured with a wrought-iron grille. Next to the portal is also an arched, grilled recess with a peephole to the hall, and it contains a figurine of St. Christopher.

The appearance of the facade is completed by three window openings. The window on the ground floor is a two-leaf, rectangular, casement window with a grille. The upper-floor windows are also grilles, with stone frames with chamfered edges and a lintel. These windows are single-leaf, casement, wooden, rectangular, divided into four panes, in which there are four small muntins set in metal. Additionally, in the central part of the front wall, there is a copper cartouche commemorating the 100th anniversary of the Diocesan Museum.

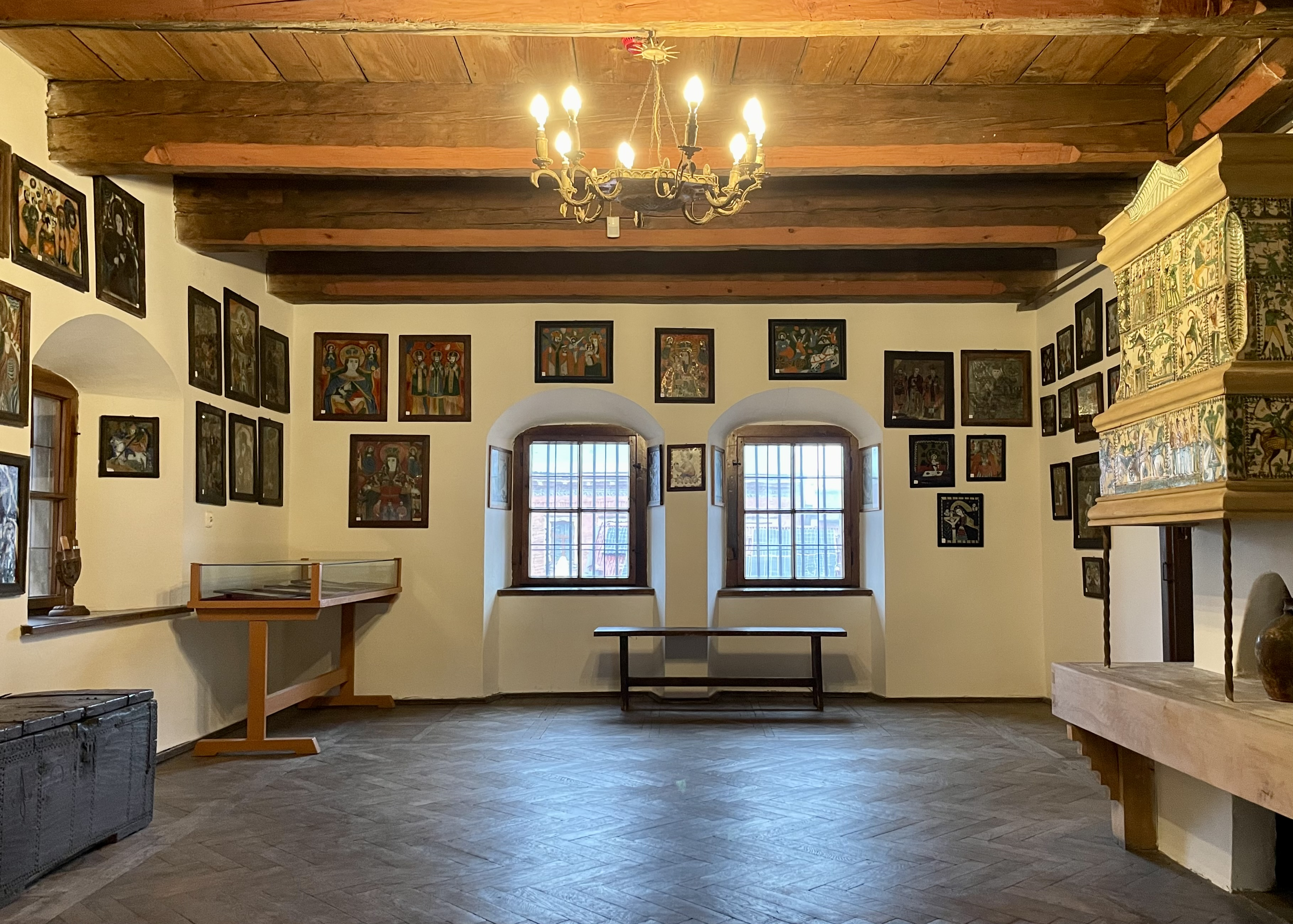
Room on the upper floor of Scholasteria. The preserved masonry heater and beam ceiling are visible

The rear wall of the house is built on the remains of the old city walls; its elevation is modest, smooth, unplastered, and lacks architectural divisions. The window openings are irregularly spaced, have unequal sizes, and are rectangular. One narrow window on the upper floor features a staircase. The remaining small upper-floor windows have stone jambs, while symmetrically below them is a large window opening with a sill, leading to the roof of the buildings opposite.

The side southern wall up to the ground floor is concealed by an extension, which is identical in appearance to the rear wall.

The roof truss is wooden, with a purlin and rafter system. The roof is of the broken Polish type, covered with fishscale roof tiles. It is topped with a wooden pinnacle.

The building has a usable area of 81 m² and a volume of 690 m³. According to the condition from 1991, it was equipped with water and sewage systems, electrical installations, an alarm system, and fire detectors. At that time, it was owned by the Tarnów Diocesan Curia.
