= Pontifical Council for Justice and Peace =

Roman Catholic Church body (1967–2017)

The Pontifical Council for Justice and Peace (Latin: Justitia et Pax) was a pontifical council of the Roman Curia dedicated to "action-oriented studies" for the international promotion of justice, peace, and human rights from the perspective of the Roman Catholic Church. To this end, it cooperated with various religious institutes and advocacy groups, as well as scholarly, ecumenical, and international organizations.

Effective 1 January 2017, the work of the Council was assumed by the Dicastery for Promoting Integral Human Development and Cardinal Peter Turkson became Prefect of the Dicastery.

== Origin ==
The Second Vatican Council had proposed the creation of a body of the universal Church whose role would be "to stimulate the Catholic Community to foster progress in needy regions and social justice on the international scene". It was in reply to this request that Pope Paul VI established the Pontifical Commission "Justitia et Pax" by a motu proprio dated 6 January 1967 (Catholicam Christi Ecclesiam).

When the Apostolic Constitution Pastor Bonus of 28 June 1988 reorganized the Roman Curia, Pope John Paul II changed its name from Commission to Pontifical Council and reconfirmed the general lines of its work.

== Objectives and mandate ==
Pastor Bonus defined the objectives and mandate of the Pontifical Council for Justice and Peace in the following terms:

The Council will promote justice and peace in the world, in the light of the Gospel and of the social teaching of the Church (art. 142).

§ 1. It will deepen the social doctrine of the Church and attempt to make it widely known and applied, both by individuals and communities, especially as regards relations between workers and employers. These relations must be increasingly marked by the spirit of the Gospel.
§ 2. It will assemble and evaluate various types of information and the results of research on justice and peace, the development of peoples and the violations of human rights. When appropriate, it will inform Episcopal bodies of the conclusions drawn. It will foster relations with international Catholic organizations and with other bodies, be they Catholic or not, that are sincerely committed to the promotion of the values of justice and peace in the world.
§ 3. It will heighten awareness of the need to promote peace, above all on the occasion of the World Day of Peace (art. 143).

It will maintain close relations with the Secretariat of State, especially when it deals publicly with problems of justice and peace in its documents or declarations (art. 144).

== Structure ==
On Saturday, May 16, 2015, Pope Francis named the Reverend Father Timothy Radcliffe, O.P., Director of the Las Casas Institute of Blackfriars in Oxford, England, which does studies on social justice and human rights, as one of the Consultors.

=== Presidents ===
- Maurice Roy (6 January 1967 - 16 December 1976)
- Bernardin Gantin (15 December 1976 - 8 April 1984)
- Roger Etchegaray (8 April 1984 - 24 June 1998)
- François-Xavier Nguyễn Văn Thuận (24 June 1998 - 16 September 2002)
- Renato Martino (1 October 2002 - 24 October 2009)
- Peter Turkson (24 October 2009 - 1 January 2017)

=== Secretaries ===
- Joseph Gremillion (1966–1974)
- Andrea Cordero Lanza di Montezemolo (1976 – 5 May 1977)
- Roger Joseph Heckel, S.J. (1977 – 27 March 1980)
- Jan Pieter Schotte, C.I.C.M. (27 June 1980 – 20 December 1983)
- Diarmuid Martin (1994 – 17 January 2001)
- Giampaolo Crepaldi (3 March 2001 – 4 July 2009)
- Mario Toso, S.D.B. (22 October 2009 - 19 January 2015)

== Activities ==
There was a two-day (June 16 and 17), 2011 "Executive Summit on Ethics for the Business World", which examined Christian views, from the Catholic perspective of Pope Benedict XVI's on financial ethics and possible positive Christian-based alternatives to contemporary status quo secular best practices in the field. The summit was co-hosted by the Pontifical Regina Apostolorum University and the Fidelis International Institute, as well as the Pontifical Academy of Sciences.

According to an online news story on the conference by Carol Glatz of Catholic News Service, on Friday, June 17, 2011:

The Vatican and some Catholic thinkers are urging businesses to not only employ ethical policies within their companies, but to become dedicated to bringing economic justice to the wider world. In fact, people should be wary of superficial ethical practices that "are adopted primarily as a marketing device, without any effect on relationships inside and outside the business itself" and without promoting justice and the common good, said Cardinal Tarcisio Bertone, the Vatican's secretary of state. Cardinal Bertone was one of a number of speakers invited to the Executive Summit on Ethics for the Business World, sponsored by the Pontifical Council for Justice and Peace and the Legionairies of Christ's Fidelis International Institute, which promotes ethics in business. The June 16–17 conference brought high-profile leaders from the manufacturing, industrial, banking and financial sectors including representatives from General Electric and Goldman Sachs, as well as Catholic experts in Catholic social teaching. "Everyone here has been 'cherry-picked.' It wasn't an open invitation to everybody," said Father Luis Garza Medina, vicar general of the Legionairies of Christ, who helped in the planning of the event. Organizers purposely chose people from different industries, countries and religions in order to hammer out ethical principles held in common, which often reflect the views inherent in Catholic social thought, namely the principles of the centrality of the human person, subsidiarity, solidarity and the pursuit of the common good, he told Catholic News Service June 17. The real challenge, however, is taking those common principles and translating them into concrete action that will have a real impact on local and world economies, and on people's lives, he said. The meeting's goal was to show how "Charity in Truth", Pope Benedict XVI's 2009 encyclical on social justice issues, could inspire leaders to find practical applications of these universal values. In his talk June 16, Cardinal Bertone said the encyclical makes clear that there is no way businesses can remain ethically neutral: They are either serving the common good or they are not

== See also ==
- Alberto Suárez Inda
- Christian finance
- Operation Spectrum, also known as the 1987 "Marxist Conspiracy", which led the Church to shut down the Justice and Peace Commission in Singapore
