= Juan Ignacio Arrieta Ochoa de Chinchetru =

Spanish Catholic bishop (b. 1951)

The Most Reverend Juan Ignacio Arrieta Ochoa de Chinchetru
- Secretary of the Pontifical Council for Legislative Texts
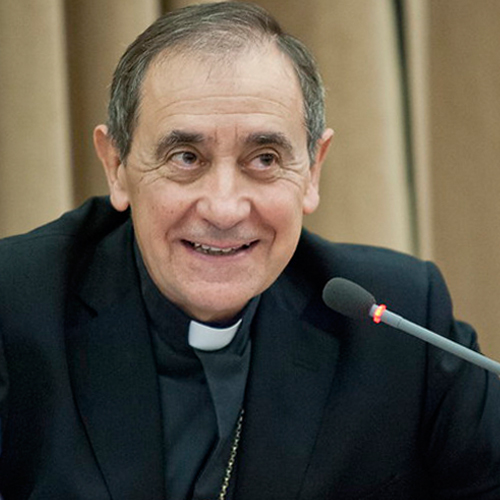
- Church: Catholic Church
- Appointed: 15 February 2007
- Predecessor: Bruno Bertagna
- Other post: Titular Bishop of Civitate (2008-)
- Previous post: Canonist of the Apostolic Penitentiary (2004-19)

Orders
- Ordination: 23 August 1977
- Consecration: 1 May 2008 by Tarcisio Bertone
- Rank: Bishop

Personal details
- Born: Juan Ignacio Arrieta Ochoa de Chinchetru; 10 April 1951 (age 75) Vitoria, Spain
- Education: University of Navarra
- Motto: Sub Tuum praesidium

Juan Ignacio Arrieta Ochoa de Chinchetru (born 10 April 1951) is a Spanish prelate of the Catholic Church who has been secretary of the Pontifical Council for Legislative Texts since 15 February 2007. A bishop since 2008, he has held several other appointments in the Roman Curia.

== Biography ==
Juan Ignacio Arrieta Ochoa de Chinchetru was born in Vitoria, Spain, on 10 April 1951. He was ordained to the priesthood for the Prelature of the Holy Cross (Opus Dei) on 23 August 1977. He received doctorates in canon law and jurisprudence and served as professor of canon law, first at the University of Navarra (Spain) and then in Rome and Venice.

Arrieta was Dean of the Faculty of Canon Law at the Pontifical University of the Holy Cross from its creation in 1984 until 1993, and again from 1995 to 1999. He founded and until 2002 directed the journal Ius Ecclesiae. In 2003 he became Dean of the Institute of Canon Law of Saint Pius X, Venice.

In the Roman Curia he held the positions of canon prelate of the Apostolic Penitentiary, legal secretary of the Supreme Tribunal of the Apostolic Signatura, and judge of the Ecclesiastical Tribunal of the State of Vatican City. He served as a consultor to the Congregation for the Clergy, the Pontifical Council for the Family, and the Pontifical Council for Legislative Texts.

Pope Benedict XVI appointed Arrieta secretary of the Pontifical Council for Legislative Texts on 15 February 2007 and named him titular bishop of Civitate on 12 April 2008. He received his episcopal consecration on 1 May 2008 from Cardinal Tarcisio Bertone. His position as secretary occasionally requires him to play a public role, commenting on a papal document or providing a legal assessment of proposals like that of the German synod in 2019.

On 26 June 2013, Pope Francis named Arrieta to the five-member Pontifical Commission investigating the Institute for the Works of Religion and made him the group's coordinator.

== Bibliography ==
- Editor:
  - Code of Canon Law Annotated (4th Ed), Chambly, Wilson & Lafleur, 2022. ISBN 978-2-924974-10-0
- Author:
  - Vatican State Law, Downers Grove, Midwest Theological Forum, 2022. ISBN 978-2-924974-10-0
  - The Church’s Structure of Governance: Theological Foundations and Canonical Development, Chambly, Wilson & Lafleur, 2025. ISBN 9782924971482

Catholic Church titles
Preceded by Bruno Bertagna	Secretary of the Pontifical Council for Legislative Texts; 15 February 2007–present	Succeeded by incumbent
