= Beneventum (Africa) =

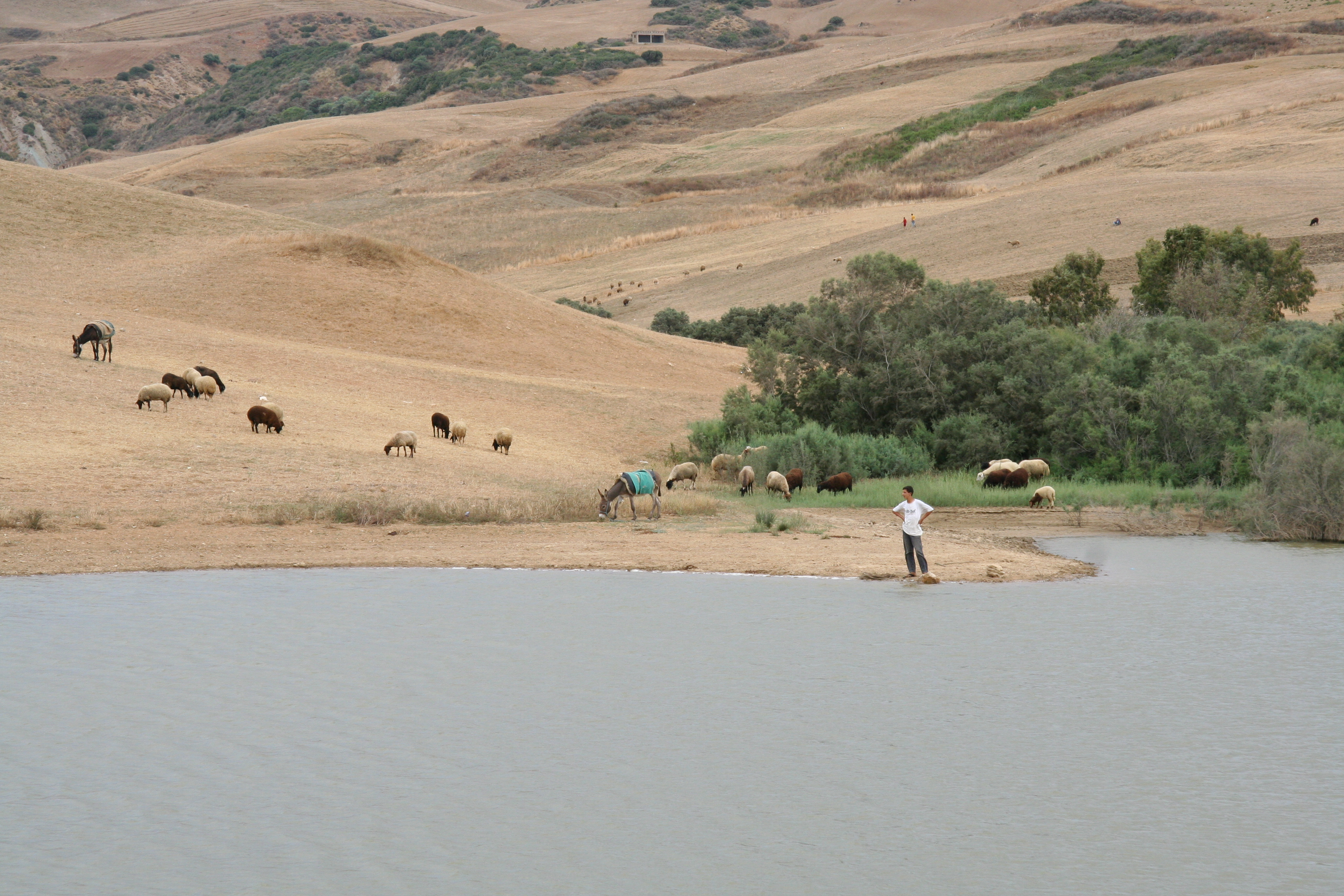
Area near Beni Ata

Beneventum was an ancient city and bishopric in Tunisia. It is now a Latin Catholic titular see.

Beneventum was a Roman and Byzantine era city in the province of Africa Proconsularis. Its presumed present location is at the ruins of Beniata, located near Bizerte in modern Tunisia.

== History ==
Beneventum was import enough in the Roman province of Africa proconsularis to become a suffragan of its capital Carthage's Metropolitan Archbishop, yet was to fade.

== Titular see ==
Very little is known of the ancient bishopric and though suffragan of the Archdiocese of Carthage no bishops are known by name. The diocese ceased to function with the arrival of the Islamic armies in the 7th century but was nominally restored in 1933 (Curiate Italian title Benevento. The city should not be confused with the Italian city of the same name.

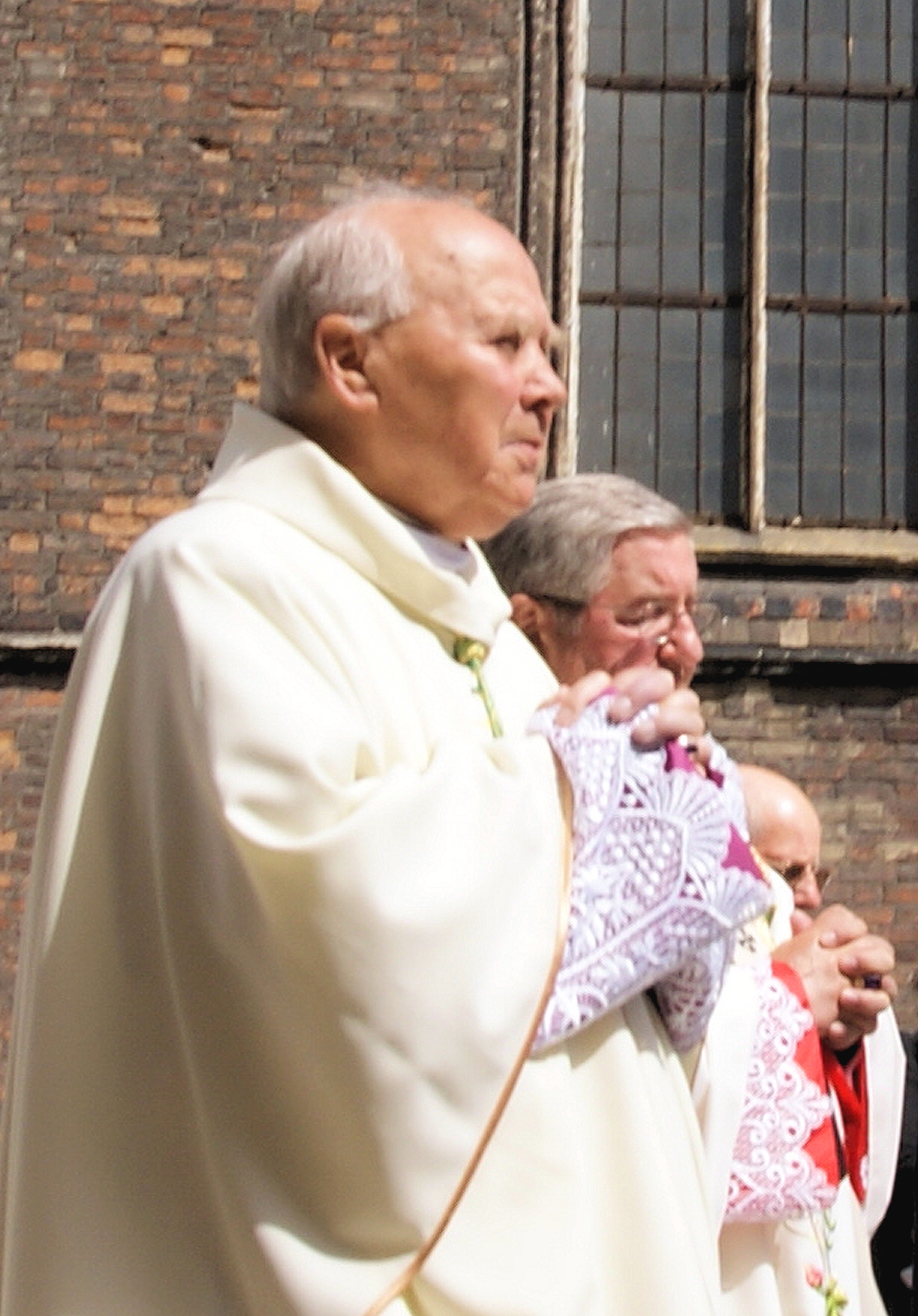
Tadeusz Gocłowski, 2011

It has following incumbents:

- Titular Bishop Carlos Oviedo Cavada, O. de M. (21 March 1964 – 25 March 1974), Auxiliary Bishop of Conceptión, Chile
- Titular Bishop Tadeusz Gocłowski, C.M. (22 March 1983 – 31 December 1984), Auxiliary Bishop of Gdańsk
- Titular Archbishop Manuel Monteiro de Castro (16 February 1985 – 18 February 2012) as Apostolic Nuncio and official of the Roman Curia, until created cardinal
- Titular Archbishop Konrad Krajewski (3 August 2013 – 28 June 2018), Almoner of His Holiness
- Titular Archbishop Michael Czerny, S.J. (4 October 2019 – 5 October 2019), Undersecretary of the Migrants and Refugees Section of the Dicastery for Promoting Integral Human Development
- Titular Archbishop Mitja Leskovar (1 May 2020 – present), Apostolic Nuncio to Iraq

== See also ==
- Catholic Church in Tunisia
