= Konrad Krajewski =

Polish cardinal of the Catholic Church (born 1963)

His Eminence Konrad Krajewski
- Cardinal, Metropolitan Archbishop of Łódź
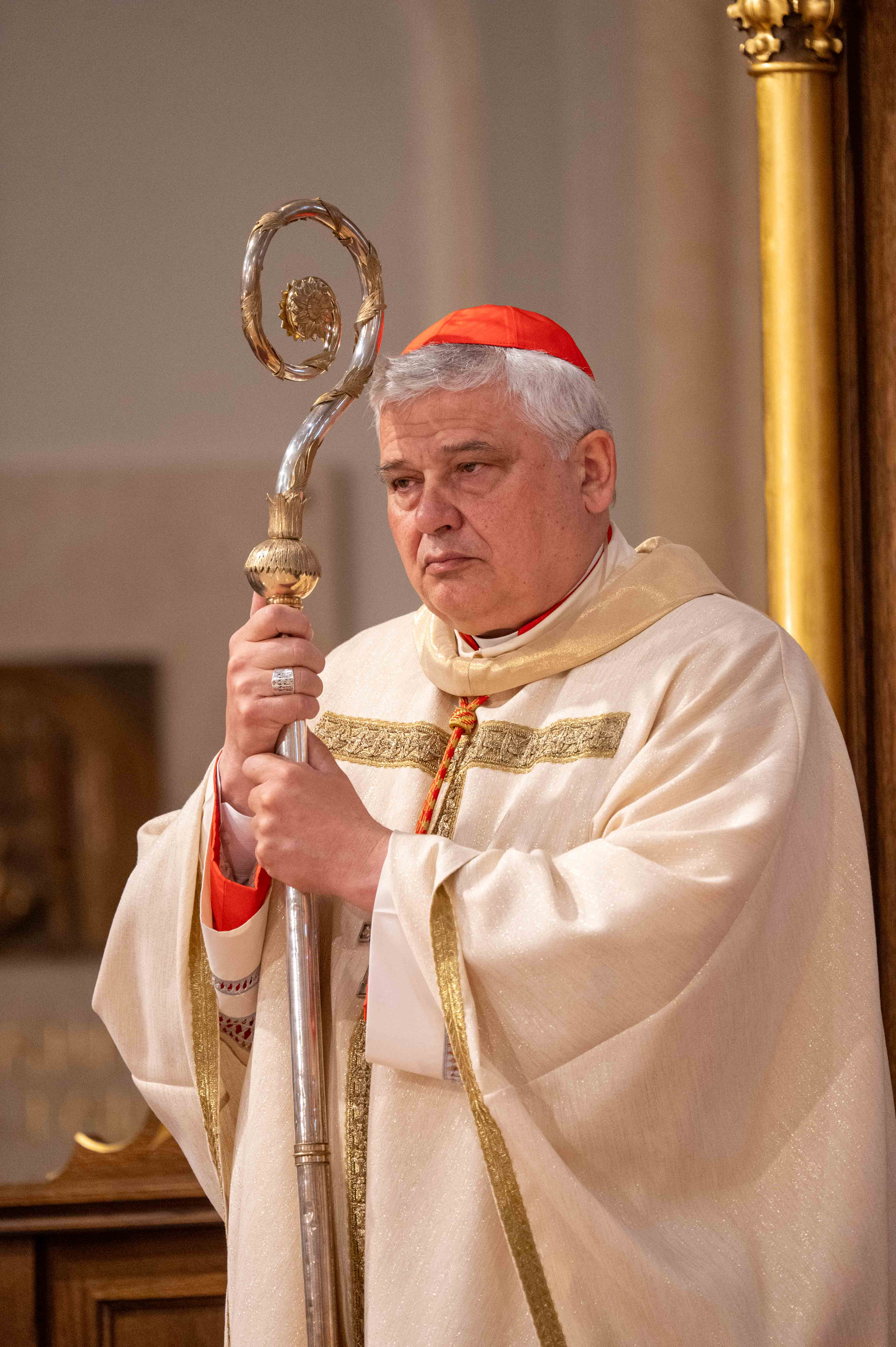
- Krajewski in 2026
- Church: Catholic
- Archdiocese: Łódź
- Appointed: 12 March 2026
- Installed: 28 March 2026
- Predecessor: Grzegorz Ryś
- Other post: Cardinal-Deacon of Santa Maria Immacolata all'Esquilino (2018–)
- Previous posts: Almoner of His Holiness (2013-2026); Titular Archbishop of Beneventum (2013–2018)

Orders
- Ordination: 11 June 1988 by Władysław Ziółek
- Consecration: 17 September 2013 by Giuseppe Bertello
- Created cardinal: 28 June 2018 by Pope Francis
- Rank: Cardinal-Deacon

Personal details
- Born: 25 November 1963 (age 62) Łódź, Poland
- Denomination: Catholic
- Education: Major Theological Seminary in Łódź; Catholic University of Lublin; Pontifical Liturgical Institute; Pontifical University of Saint Thomas Aquinas
- Motto: Misericordia (Latin for 'Mercy')
- Signature: Konrad Krajewski's signature

Styles of Konrad Krajewski
- Reference style: His Eminence; The Most Reverend Eminence
- Spoken style: Your Eminence
- Religious style: Cardinal
- Informal style: Cardinal

Ordination history of Konrad Krajewski
History
Episcopal consecration
- Consecrated by: Giuseppe Bertello
Cardinalate
- Elevated by: Pope Francis

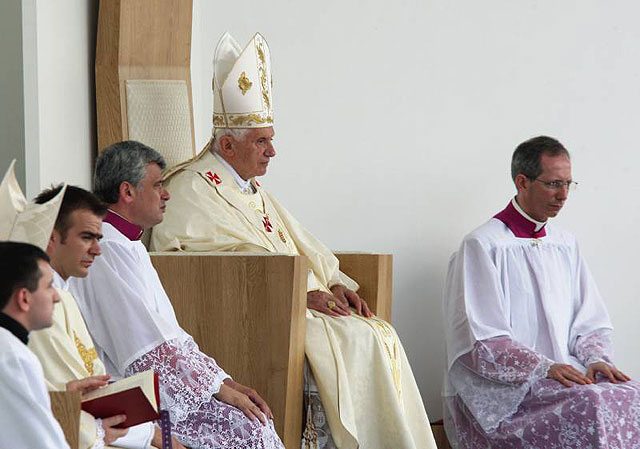
Konrad Krajewski sitting beside Pope Benedict XVI as papal master of ceremonies in Zagreb, 2011

Konrad Krajewski (pronounced [ˈkɔn.rat kraˈjɛf.skʲi]; born 25 November 1963) is a Polish Catholic prelate who was named Metropolitan Archbishop of Łódź in March 2026. He served as prefect of the Dicastery for the Service of Charity from 2013 to 2026. He served as Papal Master of Ceremonies from 1998 to 2013.

In 2013, Krajewski was appointed as Papal Almoner to coordinate the charitable concerns of Pope Francis and lead the Office of Papal Charities; this became the Dicastery for the Service of Charity when the apostolic constitution Praedicate evangelium took effect in June 2022. Pope Francis made Krajewski a cardinal on 28 June 2018.

== Biography ==
=== Early life and education ===
Konrad Krajewski was born on 25 November 1963 in Łódź, central Poland, to a family of teachers. He had an older brother, Krzysztof, who died suddenly in his sleep at the age of 29 whilst at sea. Krajewski was described by his school colleagues and mentors as a diligent and honest student, who, at the time, hoped to become an educator. Early in life, Krajewski came to be involved in the Light-Life Movement, also known as the Oasis Movement in Poland, which was aimed at the spiritual formation of parishioners during spiritual retreats. Impressed by the movement and his local priest, Krajewski decided to enter the seminary of the Archdiocese of Łódź in 1982. He subsequently earned a degree in theology from the Catholic University of Lublin and was ordained a priest on 11 June 1988. After ordination, he served the diocese for two years in pastoral work.

In 1990, Krajewski continued his studies at the Liturgical Institute of St. Anselmo in Rome. On 5 March 1993, he obtained his Licentiate in Sacred Liturgy. Krajewski earned a Doctorate in Theology from the Pontifical University of Saint Thomas Aquinas in 1995 with a dissertation entitled L'ordinazione episcopale nella riforma del Concilio Vaticano II ("Episcopal ordination in the reform of Vatican II"). During his stay in Rome, Krajewski collaborated with the Office for the Liturgical Celebrations of the Supreme Pontiff.

=== Master of Ceremonies ===
He returned to his diocese in 1995 and served as master of ceremonies for the archbishop and taught Catholic liturgy at the seminary and to the Franciscans and Salesians. In 1998, he returned to Rome to work in the Office of Liturgical Celebrations of the Supreme Pontiff. On 12 May 1999, Pope John Paul II appointed him a Papal Master of Ceremonies. Krajewski helped plan and execute all major public liturgical events presided over by the Pope, including Christmas and Easter Masses, canonizations, consistory ceremonies, and conclaves. He was tasked with ensuring that rituals were carried out in an appropriate manner and according to custom.

=== Papal Almoner ===
On 3 August 2013, Pope Francis appointed him Papal Almoner, the formal title of which office is "Almoner of His Holiness." At the same time, he was made Titular Archbishop of Beneventum. He was consecrated on 17 September 2013 by Cardinal Giuseppe Bertello with Archbishops Piero Marini and Władysław Ziółek as co-consecrators. Pope Francis attended the consecration.

On the Pope's behalf, the almoner carries out acts of charity and raises the money to fund them. Krajewski's office funds its work by selling customized parchments with a photograph of the pope and an inscription in calligraphy that document papal blessings granted on a special occasion, such as a wedding, baptism or priestly ordination. All proceeds go directly to the works of charity. In 2012, the office spent one million euros (US$1.4 million) on 6,500 requests for help.

Krajewski described how Francis has redefined the little-known office of papal almoner: "The Holy Father told me at the beginning: 'You can sell your desk. You don't need it. You need to get out of the Vatican. Don't wait for people to come ringing. You need to go out and look for the poor," Krajewski said. Requests for aid that the pope receives are delivered to the almoner daily, sometimes accompanied with notations in the pope's hand. Archbishop Krajewski has visited homes for the elderly and distributed funds to the needy. He spent four days on the island of Lampedusa after a migrant boat carrying Eritreans capsized, praying with police divers as they worked to raise the dead from the sea floor. In June 2015, Archbishop Krajewski announced plans for a thirty-bed, volunteer-run dormitory for the homeless near the Vatican. Krajewski said the entire initiative was aimed at "giving people their dignity." It opened in October 2015.

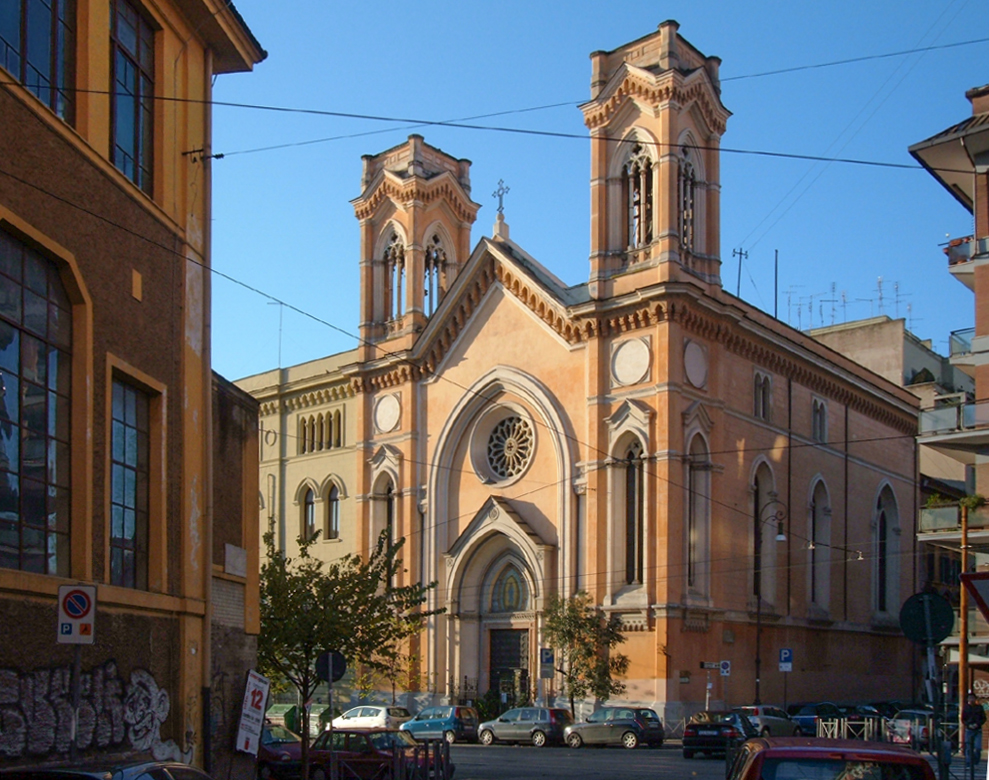
Santa Maria Immacolata all'Esquilino

Pope Francis made him a Cardinal-Deacon of Santa Maria Immacolata all'Esquilino on 28 June 2018. Following his elevation, Krajewski invited 280 poor and homeless individuals to a dinner at the Vatican's employee canteen, stating that "this red cap is for the poor and the volunteers, I have no merit."

Krajewski participated as a cardinal elector in the 2025 papal conclave that elected Pope Leo XIV.

=== Humanitarian work ===
As Cardinal and Papal Almoner, Krajewski was active in undertaking charitable and voluntary work. Notably, his aid and regular visits to people without a home, and the direct distribution of food, clothing, medicine, and sleeping bags to Rome’s homeless, gained considerable praise. The scope of his work also comprised providing better healthcare access to those in need by opening and running clinics near the Vatican, and international support in countries or areas affected by war.

On 11 May 2019, Krajewski climbed down a manhole cover in a Rome street to break a seal and switch back on the electricity supply to a building where 450 people were squatting, including 100 children, thereby restoring power and hot water which they had been without for five days. The squatters included migrants. Krajewski was criticised on Twitter by Matteo Salvini, the Deputy Prime Minister of Italy, for his action but responded by telling the Italian newspaper Corriere della Sera: "From now on.... I'll pay the bills; indeed I will even pay his [Salvini's]".

Krajewski received significant attention in early May 2020 when he wired charity money for food to a group of transgender sex workers who had been left out of a job due to the COVID-19 pandemic. Krajewski expressed surprise at the attention given to this action, as he defined it within the normal charitable works of the Catholic Church. In the same month, two truckloads of medical supplies, including masks and other protective equipment, were donated and sent from Poland to the Vatican. Krajewski played a pivotal role in facilitating this transport, which was a gesture of solidarity from the Polish people during the health crisis. Krajewski also supervised that food and supplies reached those who were isolated during COVID-19 lockdowns.

In March 2022, in response to the Russian invasion of Ukraine, Pope Francis sent Krajewski as a special envoy to Ukraine, along with Cardinal Michael Czerny, who is head of the papal office that deals with migration, charity, justice and peace. This mission, which involved several trips, was considered a highly unusual move of Vatican diplomacy. In Ukraine, Krajewski personally delivered generators, ambulances, food and humanitarian aid to those in need in the war zone under attack, and paid respects to the remains of hundreds of people in mass graves onsite. Krajewski drove one of the ambulance vehicles from the Vatican to Ukraine, accompanied by a homeless man who assisted with the long journey.

=== Prefect of the Dicastery for the Service of Charity ===
Pope Francis promulgated the apostolic constitution Praedicate evangelium on 19 March 2022, with an effective date of 5 June 2022. This constitution elevated the Office of the Papal Almoner into the Dicastery for the Service of Charity. Since that date, Krajewski has served as the Prefect of the Dicastery, while also retaining the title of Papal Almoner.

=== Metropolitan Archbishop of Łódź ===
Pope Leo XIV appointed Krajewski as Metropolitan Archbishop of Łódź on 12 March 2026.

== Personal life and views ==
Krajewski was a close collaborator of Pope Francis. He is known for his direct approach to social issues and bold gestures, claiming that the Catholic Church’s commitment is to human dignity over bureaucracy.

Krajewski is discreet about his views and prefers to focus on assigned tasks and the humanitarian effort. However, he has spoken out in the past about the importance of unity of the Church in times of crisis and adversity.

== See also ==
- Cardinals created by Francis

Catholic Church titles
Preceded by Manuel Monteiro de Castro	— TITULAR — Titular Archbishop of Beneventum; 3 August 2013 – 28 June 2018	Succeeded by Michael Czerny
Preceded by Guido Pozzo	Almoner of His Holiness; 3 August 2013 – 12 March 2026	Succeeded by Luis Marín de San Martín
New title	Cardinal-Deacon of Santa Maria Immacolata all'Esquilino; 28 June 2018 – present	Incumbent
