= Dicastery =

Department of the Roman Curia

A dicastery (/dɪˈkæstəri/; from Greek δικαστήριον (dikastērion) 'law-court'; from δικαστής, dikastes, 'judge, juror') is a department in the Roman Curia of the Catholic Church.

== History ==
=== Pastor bonus ===
Pastor bonus (1988) includes this definition:

By the word "dicasteries" are understood the Secretariat of State, Congregations, Tribunals, Councils and Offices, namely, the Apostolic Camera, the Administration of the Patrimony of the Apostolic See and the Prefecture for the Economic Affairs of the Holy See.

However, since Praedicate evangelium came into force, Pastor bonus and its content is obsolete.

== Praedicate evangelium ==
Under the new structure of the Roman Curia created by Praedicate evangelium (effective since 5 June 2022), the former congregations and pontifical councils are replaced with dicasteries.

== Current dicasteries ==
As of 2022, there are sixteen dicasteries:

Dicastery	Current prefect	Country	Picture
Dicastery for the Doctrine of the Faith	Cardinal Víctor Manuel Fernández	Argentina	
Dicastery for Divine Worship and the Discipline of the Sacraments	Cardinal Arthur Roche	United Kingdom	
Dicastery for Evangelization	Pope Leo XIV	United States; Peru	
Dicastery for the Causes of Saints	Cardinal Marcello Semeraro	Italy	
Dicastery for Bishops	Archbishop Filippo Iannone	Italy	
Dicastery for the Clergy	Cardinal Lazarus You Heung-sik	South Korea	
Dicastery for the Eastern Churches	Cardinal Claudio Gugerotti	Italy	
Dicastery for Institutes of Consecrated Life and Societies of Apostolic Life	Sister Simona Brambilla	Italy	
Dicastery for Culture and Education	Cardinal José Tolentino de Mendonça	Portugal	
Dicastery for the Service of Charity	Archbishop Luis Marín de San Martín	Spain	
Dicastery for the Laity, Family and Life	Cardinal Kevin Joseph Farrell	Ireland	
Dicastery for Promoting Christian Unity	Cardinal Kurt Koch	Switzerland	
Dicastery for Interreligious Dialogue	Cardinal George Koovakad	India	
Dicastery for Promoting Integral Human Development	Sister Alessandra Smerilli	Italy	
Dicastery for Legislative Texts	Archbishop Anthony Randazzo	Australia	
Dicastery for Communication	Mr. Paolo Ruffini	Italy	
