= Praedicate evangelium =

2022 apostolic constitution of Pope Francis

Praedicate evangelium Latin for 'Preach the gospel' Apostolic constitution of Pope Francis
- Signature date: 19 March 2022
- Subject: Reform of the Roman Curia
- Text: In Latin; In English
- AAS: 114 (4): 375-455

Praedicate evangelium (English: Preach the gospel) is an apostolic constitution reforming the Roman Curia; it was published and promulgated on 19 March 2022 by Pope Francis, and the document took effect on 5 June 2022.

The apostolic constitution was developed over nine years by the Council of Cardinals. It is the fifth time that a reform of the Roman Curia of this kind has occurred. The document replaces Pope John Paul II's Pastor bonus of 1988.

== Preparation ==
The reform of the Roman Curia had been requested by the cardinals at the meetings held before the 2013 conclave. Immediately after becoming pope, Francis started working on the reform.

The Council of Cardinals was established in 2013 by Pope Francis to revise Pastor bonus. However, at its first meeting the council decided the changes planned were important enough to deserve an entirely new constitution. The council began working on the new constitution in 2014, and approved the first draft in 2018. This draft "was sent to the heads of current Vatican offices, bishops' conferences around the world and other experts in the spring of 2019".

In February 2020, during its regular meeting, the Council of Cardinals re-read the constitution. Revisions were adopted at the recommendation of the dicasteries and "some experts". At the same meeting, several proposed amendments were also considered.

In October 2020, after the Council of Cardinals had presented the updated draft of the constitution to the Pope, the competent Dicasteries proceeded with the reading of the draft. According to the official communiqué, the Pope had stated that the reform coming with the constitution was "already underway, also in some administrative and economic aspects".

In December 2020, the Council of Cardinals met online to continue the work on the constitution. The commission namely studied amendments proposed by the consulted dicasteries.

Cardinal Parolin, Secretary of State, said in a 29 January 2021 interview that "he believed that 'considerable progress' had already been made in the pope's reform of the Roman Curia, particularly with regard to Vatican finances, pointing to the creation of the Council for the Economy, the Secretariat for the Economy, and the Office of the Revisor [i.e. Auditor] General". Parolin adds that some reforms he considers minor might happen in the form of two fusions of dicasteries: the fusion of the Congregation for the Evangelization of Peoples with the Pontifical Council for Promoting the New Evangelization, and the fusion of the Congregation for Catholic Education with the Pontifical Council for Culture. He says: "Now it is a question of giving homogeneity to all the reforms which have been made, by means of the new apostolic constitution which has for at least provisional title: 'Predicate Evangelii [sic]'". He also stated that the new apostolic constitution was mostly finished and would be published "before the end of this year".

Cardinal Parolin stated in July 2021: "The text [of the constitution], which aims to give a coherent framework to all the reforms already undertaken, is currently being examined by canonists to adapt the terminology to the juridical character of the document".

== Promulgation, publication and effect ==
The apostolic constitution was promulgated on 19 March 2022 and published in Italian the same day, which was Saint Joseph's Day and the ninth anniversary of the papal inauguration of Pope Francis. Praedicate evangelium was set to take effect on 5 June 2022. The constitution was initially released only in Italian.

On 21 March 2022, Praedicate evangelium was presented at the Holy See Press Office during an official press conference by experts.

On 31 March, the Holy See published the typical edition in L'Osservatore Romano. This edition had some differences with the edition previously publicly published.

The document came into effect on 5 June 2022, the feast of Pentecost.

== Content ==
The apostolic constitution states it has "fully abrogated and replaced" Pastor bonus.

Praedicate evangelium confirms the changes previously made by Pope Francis to the structure of the Congregation for the Doctrine of the Faith in February 2022.

=== Roman Curia ===
The constitution defines the Roman Curia as "the institution which the Roman Pontiff ordinarily makes use of in the exercise of his supreme pastoral office and his universal mission in the world". It also states that the Roman Curia "is not placed between the pope and the bishops, rather it is at the service of both according to the modalities that are proper to each". Furthermore, it states: "The Roman Curia is composed of the Secretariat of State, the Dicasteries and other bodies, all juridically equal to each other".

=== Philosophy ===
The constitution "enshrines much of Pope Francis's broader vision for the church into the statutes of its governing body".

The document states: "This new apostolic constitution proposes to better harmonize the present exercise of the Curia's service with the path of evangelization that the church, especially in this season, is living". The constitution puts an emphasis on synodality as well as on "the missionary conversion" of the Catholic Church and the Roman Curia.

Before the reform, the most important department of the Vatican was the Congregation for the Doctrine of the Faith and its predecessors. With Praedicate evangelium, the most important department is the Dicastery for Evangelization, with the Dicastery for the Doctrine of the Faith coming second. During the official press conference presenting the apostolic constitution, speaker Marco Mellino stated that the order in which the dicasteries appear in Praedicate evangelium had no juridical effect, but that "perhaps" the order of the first three dicasteries did: evangelization (Dicastery for Evangelization) comes before doctrine (Dicastery for the Doctrine of the Faith), and doctrine is closely followed by the Dicastery for the Service of Charity.

=== Laity in leadership positions ===
The constitution states that baptised lay Catholics, men and women, can be appointed to head dicasteries or other bodies of the Roman Curia; however, the specific statutes of those departments can make it so that they can only be headed by bishops or cardinals. Pastor bonus reserved most leadership positions to bishops and cardinals.

The constitution says the role of Catholic laity in taking part in the governing of the Roman Curia is "essential" due to their familiarity with family life and "social reality".

=== Appointments and terms of office ===
Praedicate evangelium states the Roman Curial officials must be selected "according to objective and transparency criteria". The apostolic constitution states without giving any more precision that officials must have "an adequate number of years of experience in pastoral activities" before being appointed.

The constitution states the department officials should as much as possible "[reflect] the universality of the Church" by being from different countries from around the world.

Those appointed as department prefects, secretaries, undersecretaries, and other major officials can only exercise their function for a five-years term. Lower-level officials have a five-year term after which they will have to go back to their diocese or religious institute. The pope can extend any of those terms if he so decides.

=== Meetings ===
According to the constitution, all heads of each Vatican departments are to meet regularly with the pope. Previously, the custom was that only the heads of the Congregation for the Doctrine of the Faith and the Congregation for Bishops regularly met with the pope.

Regular internal meetings of departments and meetings between heads of different departments are to take place; those inter-department meetings are to be organised by the Secretary of State with the approval of the pope.

=== Dicasteries ===
Curial departments that were previously called congregations or pontifical councils are now named "dicasteries", e.g. the Congregation for the Doctrine of the Faith will be known as the "Dicastery for the Doctrine of the Faith". The Curia according to Praedicate evangelium includes 16 dicasteries.

The dicasteries of the Roman Curia as established in the apostolic constitution are:

- Dicastery for Evangelization
  - This new dicastery is formed through the merger of the Pontifical Council for Promoting the New Evangelization and the Congregation for the Evangelization of Peoples. It is chaired by the pope who is its prefect.
- Dicastery for the Doctrine of the Faith
- Dicastery for the Service of Charity (formerly the Office of Papal Charities)
- Dicastery for the Eastern Churches
- Dicastery for Divine Worship and the Discipline of the Sacraments
- Dicastery for the Causes of Saints
- Dicastery for Bishops
- Dicastery for the Clergy
- Dicastery for Institutes of Consecrated Life and Societies of Apostolic Life
- Dicastery for the Laity, Family and Life
- Dicastery for Promoting Christian Unity
- Dicastery for Interreligious Dialogue
- Dicastery for Culture and Education
  - The dicastery is formed through the merger of the Pontifical Council for Culture with the Congregation for Catholic Education. It is divided into two sections.
- Dicastery for Promoting Integral Human Development
- Dicastery for Legislative Texts
- Dicastery for Communication

==== Scopes ====
The Dicastery for the Doctrine of the Faith is divided into two sections: a doctrinal section and a disciplinary section. The doctrinal section is to work in close contact with church leaders all over the world "in the exercise of their mission as authentic teachers and teachers of the faith, for which they are bound to safeguard and promote the integrity of that faith". The doctrinal section must also "examin[e] writings and opinions that appear contrary or harmful to the right faith and morals", seek "dialogue with their authors and presen[t] suitable remedies to be made, in accordance with its own norms" and "endeavo[r] to ensure that there is an adequate refutation of the dangerous errors and doctrines which are spread among the Christian people". The Pontifical Commission for the Protection of Minors is "established within the Dicastery" for the Doctrine of the Faith; the tasks of this commission "is to provide the Roman Pontiff with advice and counsel and to propose the most appropriate initiatives for the protection of minors and vulnerable persons".

The Dicastery for the Causes of Saints has the task "to judge the granting of the title of Doctor of the Church to a saint, after having obtained the vote of the Dicastery for the Doctrine of the Faith concerning their eminent doctrine".

The apostolic constitution gives the Dicastery for Divine Worship and the Discipline of the Sacraments responsibility for "promoting the sacred liturgy according to the renewal undertaken by the Second Vatican Council" and "the regulation and discipline of the sacred liturgy with regard to the use — granted according to established norms — of the liturgical books prior to the reform of the Second Vatican Council". (Note: The Italian text of Praedicate evangelium previously said the dicastery "deals with the regulation and discipline of the Sacred Liturgy as regards the extraordinary form of the Roman Rite". However, on 21 March 2022 the Holy See stated this mention of an "extraordinary form" was a typographical error which was present due to this part of the apostolic constitution having been written before Traditionis custodes had been promulgated and the recent decisions taken concerning the Priestly Fraternity of Saint Peter; the Holy See stated this "terminology" mistake would be corrected. On 24 March 2022, it was reported the wording of the Italian version had been changed. This change was also present in the typical edition of the text published later.) The dicastery also takes care of "the drafting or revision and updating of the typical editions of liturgical books". Furthermore, "[t]he dicastery confirms the translations of liturgical books into current languages and gives recognitio [formal recognition] to their appropriate adaptations to local cultures, legitimately approved by the bishops' conferences".

=== Other departments ===
The apostolic constitution also sets out "the role of other Vatican institutions, including judicial bodies such as the Apostolic Penitentiary, economic organizations such as Secretariat for the Economy, and other offices such as the Prefecture of the Papal Household. It lists the duties of the Camerlengo of the Holy Roman Church, who oversees the functioning of the Vatican during a papal interregnum. It also defines the qualities expected of lawyers working for the Holy See, who are expected 'to lead an integral and exemplary Christian life and to carry out the duties entrusted to them with the utmost conscience and for the good of the Church'".

The Secretariat of State is to "closely assis[t] the Roman Pontiff in the exercise of his supreme mission". This secretariat is divided by the apostolic constitution into three sections: the Section for General Affairs, the Section for Relations with States and International Organizations, and the Section for Diplomatic Personnel of the Holy See.

The first section has broad responsibilities; those include "attending to the handling of affairs concerning the daily service of the Roman Pontiff," coordinating the work of dicasteries "without prejudice to their autonomy," drafting papal documents such as apostolic letters, and giving "indications to the Dicastery for Communication regarding official communications concerning both the acts of the Roman Pontiff and the activity of the Holy See". In the organisation predating Praedicate evangelium, the Secretariat of State only had two sections: one for the General Affairs of the Catholic Church, the other for Relations with States. The third section had previously been added in 2017 by Pope Francis.

== Explanations ==
In April 2022, Pope Francis stated that the book-length interview of cardinal Oscar Rodriguez Maradiaga on the constitution, titled Praedicate Evangelium: A new curia for a new time, "adequately unravels the meaning and itinerary of this meticulous and decisive work of revision and proposals".

In a June 2022 interview, Pope Francis stated Praedicate evangelium was the culmination of "eight-and-a-half years of work and inquiries". He adds that the document implements the requests made by cardinals before the 2013 conclave, and places "a missionary-style experience" at the heart of the Catholic Church's work.

== See also ==
- Council of Cardinal Advisers
