= Giulio Serafini =

Italian prelate

His Eminence Giulio Serafini
- Prefect of the Congregation of the Council
- Church: Roman Catholic Church
- Appointed: 4 July 1930
- Term ended: 16 July 1938
- Predecessor: Donato Raffaele Sbarretti Tazza
- Successor: Luigi Maglione
- Other post(s): Cardinal-Priest of Santa Maria sopra Minerva (1930–38); President of the Pontifical Commission for the Authentic Interpretation of the Code of Canon Law (1936–38)
- Previous post(s): Bishop of Pescia (1907); Titular Bishop of Lampascus (1907–30); Secretary of the Congregation of the Council (1923–30)

Orders
- Ordination: 6 April 1890
- Consecration: 26 May 1907 by Pietro Respighi
- Created cardinal: 30 June 1930 by Pope Pius XI
- Rank: Cardinal-Priest

Personal details
- Born: Giulio Serafini; 12 October 1867; Bolsena, Orvieto, Papal States
- Died: 16 July 1938 (aged 70); Rome, Kingdom of Italy
- Buried: Santa Maria sopra Minerva
- Motto: Gloriam Dei ut seraphim cantem

Styles of Giulio Serafini
- Reference style: His Eminence
- Spoken style: Your Eminence
- Informal style: Cardinal
- See: Lampsaco (titular see)

Giulio Serafini (12 October 1867 – 16 July 1938) was an Italian prelate of the Catholic Church who was made a cardinal in 1930. He served as Prefect of the Congregation of the Council from 1930 until his death in 1938, after serving as the Commission's secretary from 1923 to 1930. He also led the Pontifical Commission for the Authentic Interpretation of the Code of Canon Law from 1936 to 1938.

== Biography ==
Serafini was born in Bolsena, Italy. He was educated at the Minor Seminary of Orvieto and the Roman-Pio Seminary, Rome, where he earned a doctorate utriusque iuris (in both canon and civil law). He was ordained a priest on 6 April 1890. He served as a faculty member of the Seminary of Orvieto from 1895 until 1901 and was its rector from 1897 until 1901. He was created Privy chamberlain of His Holiness on 7 January 1904.

He served as faculty member of the Pontifical Roman Athenaeum of Sant'Apollinare between 1901 and 1907. He was rector of the Pontificio Seminario Pio from 1901 to 1903. Pope Pius X appointed him Bishop of Pescia on 4 March 1907, and he was consecrated on 26 May by Pietro Respighi, Cardinal Vicar of Rome. On 21 December of the same year he was transferred to the titular see of Lampsacus.

On 16 April 1923, Pope Pius XI named him a consultor to the Congregation for the Oriental Churches. and on 28 October 1923 Secretary of the Congregation of the Council.

Pope Pius created him Cardinal-Deacon of Santa Maria sopra Minerva in the consistory of 30 June 1930.

Pope Pius named him Prefect of the Congregation of the Council on 4 July 1930 and President of the Pontifical Commission for the Authentic Interpretation of Code of Canon Law in 1936.

Serafini held both positions until his death on 16 July 1938. He is buried in the church of Santa Maria sopra Minerva in Rome.

Catholic Church titles
Preceded by Pietro Gasparri	President of the Pontifical Commission for the Authentic Interpretation of Code of Canon Law; 30 June 1930 – 16 July 1938	Succeeded by Luigi Sincero
Preceded by Donato Sbarretti	Prefect of the Congregation of the Council; 4 July 1930 – 16 July 1938	Succeeded by Luigi Maglione
