= Luigi Sincero =

Roman Catholic Cardinal

His Eminence Luigi Sincero
- Secretary of the Congregation for the Oriental Churches
- Church: Roman Catholic Church
- Appointed: 3 February 1927
- Term ended: 7 February 1936
- Predecessor: Giovanni Tacci Porcelli
- Successor: Eugène-Gabriel-Gervais-Laurent Tisserant
- Other posts: Cardinal-Bishop of Palestrina (1933–36); President of the Pontifical Commission for the Codification of Oriental Canon Law (1934–36); President of the Pontifical Commission for the Authentic Interpretation of the Code of Canon Law (1934–36)
- Previous posts: Prelate Auditor of the Roman Rota (1908–17); Secretary of the Pontifical Commission for the Authentic Interpretation of the Code of Canon Law (1917–23); Secretary of the College of Cardinals (1919–23); Assessor of the Consistorial Congregation (1920–23); Cardinal-Deacon of San Giorgio in Velabro (1923–28); Pro-Secretary of the Congregation for the Oriental Churches (1926–27); Cardinal-Priest of San Giorgio in Velabro pro hac vice (1928–33); Titular Archbishop of Petra (1929); Camerlengo of the College of Cardinals (1930–31)

Orders
- Ordination: 24 September 1892
- Consecration: 13 January 1929 by Pope Pius XI
- Created cardinal: 23 May 1923 by Pope Pius XI
- Rank: Cardinal-Deacon (1923–28); Cardinal-Priest (1928–33); Cardinal-Bishop (1933–36)

Personal details
- Born: Luigi Sincero; 26 March 1870 Trino Vercellese, Vercelli, Kingdom of Sardinia
- Died: 7 February 1936 (aged 65) Rome, Kingdom of Italy
- Education: Pontifical Gregorian University; Pontifical Academy of Saint Thomas Aquinas; University of Turin
- Motto: Sincero corde servire Deo
- Coat of arms

Styles of Luigi Sincero
- Reference style: His Eminence
- Spoken style: Your Eminence
- Informal style: Cardinal
- See: Palestrina (Suburbicarian diocese)

Luigi Sincero (26 March 1870 – 7 February 1936) was a Roman Catholic Cardinal and President of the Pontifical Commission for the Authentic Interpretation of the Code of Canon Law and Secretary of Sacred Congregation for the Oriental Churches, the title of Prefect held by the Popes from 1917 until 1967.

== Early life and priesthood ==
He was born in Trino Vercellese, Piedmont, Italy. He was educated at the Seminary of Vercelli and the Pontifical Gregorian University, Rome. He was ordained in 1892. He was chosen as the Vice-rector of the Pontifical Lombard Seminary in 1894. He served as a faculty member of the Seminary of Vercelli and canon theologian of its cathedral from 1894 until 1908. He was appointed an auditor of the Roman Rota on 20 October 1908. He was secretary of the Pontifical Commission for the Authentic Interpretation of the Code of Canon Law on 18 October 1917 and Secretary of the Sacred College of Cardinals in 1919. He served as secretary of the conclave of 1922.

== Cardinalate ==
He was made Cardinal-Deacon of S. Giorgio in Velabro in the consistory of 23 May 1923 by Pope Pius XI. Pope Pius appointed Sincero Secretary of the Congregation for the Oriental Churches on 29 January 1927. He opted for the order of cardinal priests and his deaconry was elevated pro hac vice on 17 December 1928.

== Episcopate ==
Pope Pius appointed him titular archbishop of Petra di Palestina on 11 January 1929. He was Consecrated two days later in the Sistine Chapel by Pope Pius XI. He was elected to the order of cardinal bishops, taking the suburbicarian see of Palestrina on 13 March 1933.

Pope Pius appointed him president of the Pontifical Commission for the Codification of the Oriental Canon Law on 23 November 1934, and president of the Pontifical Commission for the Authentic Interpretation of the Code of Canon Law on 12 December 1934.

He died just short of his 66th birthday on 7 February 1936.

== Books and articles ==
- Bräuer, Martin (2014). Handbuch der Kardinäle: 1846–2012 (in German). Berlin: De Gruyter. pp. 1909–1910. ISBN 978-3-11-026947-5.

Catholic Church titles
Preceded by Giovanni Tacci Porcelli	Secretary of the Sacred Congregation for the Oriental Churches; 29 January 1927 – 7 February 1936	Succeeded by Eugène-Gabriel-Gervais-Laurent Tisserant
Preceded by Vincenzo Vannutelli	Cardinal-Bishop of Palestrina; 13 March 1933 – 7 February 1936	Succeeded by Angelo Dolci
Preceded by Giulio Serafini	President of the Pontifical Commission for the Authentic Interpretation of the Code of Canon Law; 12 December 1934 – 7 February 1936	Succeeded by Massimo Massimi
