= Curia (Catholic Church) =

Type of governing body within the Catholic Church

A curia is an official body that governs an entity within the Catholic Church. These curias range from the relatively simple diocesan curia; to the larger patriarchal curias; to the curia of various Catholic particular churches; to the Roman Curia, which is the central government of the Catholic Church. Other Catholic bodies, such as religious institutes, may also have curias.

These curias are historically descended from the Roman Curiae, and they keep that name even though they now have very different functions. When the Roman Empire collapsed, many of the administrative functions previously done by the state were subsumed by the only solid institution left, which was the church. The Bishop and curia took the place of the government officials, often to the point of sitting at the same chair in the same building. The Curia therefore passed into religious hands, and afterwards changed functions many times but always keeping its traditional name, at least in those Christian denominations that keep a strong continuity with the Apostolic tradition.

== Diocesan curia ==
Every diocese and eparchy has a curia, consisting of the chief officials of the diocese. These officials assist the diocesan bishop in governing the particular church.

This diocesan curia includes the vicar general, who is normally also the moderator of the curia, any episcopal vicars, the chancellor of the curia, vice-chancellors and notaries, and a finance officer and financial council. The bishop may also add other officials of his choice.

== Patriarchal curia ==
Patriarchates and Major Archiepiscopates of the Eastern Catholic Churches have an assembly called the Patriarchal Curia, which assists the patriarch or major archbishop in administering the sui juris church. The patriarchal curia is distinct from the diocesan or eparchial curia of the patriarch or major archbishop's diocese or eparchy.

The patriarchal curia consists of the permanent synod of the Church, the chancellor, assistant chancellor, and notaries, the patriarchal finance officer, the patriarchal liturgical commission and other patriarchal commissions, and the patriarchal tribunal. Up to three bishops may be elected specifically to serve in the patriarchal curia.

== Roman Curia ==
The administrative unit of the Holy See is called the Roman Curia, which assists the Pope in governing the Catholic Church. The Roman Curia includes the Secretariats, the Curial Congregations, the Pontifical Councils, Pontifical Commissions, the tribunals, and other offices.
