= Council of Cardinals =

Group of cardinal advisers

The Council of Cardinals (Italian: Consiglio dei cardinali, Latin: Consilium Cardinalium Summo Pontifici, lit. 'Council of Cardinals to the Supreme Pontiff'; also called C9 because it contained nine cardinal members for a time) or Council of Cardinal Advisers is a group of cardinals of the Catholic Church appointed by Pope Francis to serve as his advisers. The council was formally established on 28 September 2013.

== Abbreviations ==
The Council of Cardinals has been named under abbreviations referring to the number of cardinals advisers which, over time, it has comprised: C8 (eight cardinals), C9 (nine cardinals), C6 (six cardinals), and C7 (seven cardinals).

== History ==
The appointment of a group of eight advisers and one secretary to support the pope and the reform of the Roman Curia was announced on 13 April 2013, one month after his election. The same group was formally established as the Council of Cardinals on 28 September of the same year by a chirograph of Pope Francis.

Secretary of State Pietro Parolin was added as a member of the council in July 2014. The Holy See used the expression "Council of the nine" (Consiglio dei nove in Italian) in September 2014.

In 2018, Marco Mellino was named as adjunct secretary to the council's secretary Marcello Semeraro. Pope Francis also removed the eldest three of the council's nine members in late 2018.

Francis appointed another cardinal as a member in 2020, and also replaced secretary Marcello Semeraro with Marco Mellino.

In March 2023, three cardinal advisers were removed, and five new cardinal advisers were appointed; the three other cardinals and the secretary were re-appointed. This made the current total of nine cardinal advisers and one secretary. On 24 April 2023, the renewed Council of Cardinals held their first meeting, over which Pope Francis presided.

In February 2024, the role of women was discussed. Anglican Bishop Jo Bailey Wells, Salesian Sister Linda Pocher and consecrated virgin Goiliva Di Berardino addressed the Council "on the role of women in the Church."

On 15 April 2024, the Council met, in the presence of Pope Francis.

On 17 June, the third meeting of the Council of 2024 began, with the presence of Pope Francis.

== Purpose ==
On 13 April 2013, the Holy See stated the cardinals had been appointed "to advise [the Pope] in the government of the universal Church and to study a plan for revising the Apostolic Constitution on the Roman Curia, 'Pastor Bonus'". In a chirograph dated 28 September 2013, Pope Francis stated the Council had the goal "of assisting me in the governance of the universal Church and of studying a project for the revision of the Apostolic Constitution Pastor Bonus on the Roman Curia", and that "said Council will be a further expression of episcopal communion and assistance to the munus petrinum which the Episcopate across the world is able to offer".

The Council of Cardinals was thus created primarily to assist Pope Francis in the reform of the Roman Curia. Said reform was promulgated in 2022 through the apostolic constitution Praedicate evangelium. The Council continues to exist and to perform various activities, despite having achieved its main goal.

Due to the advisory role of the body, some publications have likened it to a privy council.

== Leadership and membership ==
The council currently comprises nine cardinals, assisted by Bishop Marco Mellino as its secretary:

1. (Italy) Pietro Parolin, Cardinal Secretary of State (since 2014)
2. (Spain) Fernando Vérgez Alzaga LC, President Emeritus of the Governorate of Vatican City State and President Emeritus of the Pontifical Commission for Vatican City State (since 2023)
3. (Democratic Republic of the Congo) Fridolin Ambongo Besungu OFMCap, Archbishop of Kinshasa (since 2020)
4. (India) Oswald Gracias, Archbishop of Bombay (since 2013)
5. (United States) Seán Patrick O'Malley OFMCap, Archbishop of Boston and President of the Pontifical Commission for the Protection of Minors (since 2013)
6. (Spain) Juan José Omella, Archbishop of Barcelona (since 2023)
7. (Canada) Gérald Lacroix ISPX, Archbishop of Quebec (since 2023)
8. Jean-Claude Hollerich SJ, Archbishop of Luxembourg (since 2023)
9. (Brazil) Sérgio da Rocha, Archbishop of São Salvador da Bahia (since 2023)

At the time of its formation, the council had eight members. Cardinal Parolin was not among the council's original membership, but attended the meetings regularly and, in July 2014, was confirmed by the Holy See Press Office as a ninth member of the council.

== Former members ==
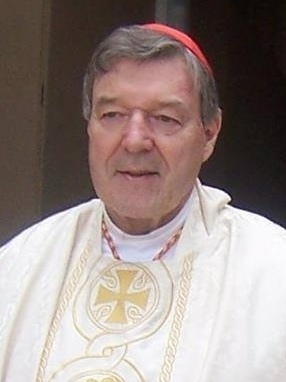
Pell in 2006

- 2013–2018: Francisco Javier Errázuriz Ossa
- 2013–2018: Laurent Monsengwo Pasinya
- 2013–2018: George Pell
- 2013–2023: Reinhard Marx
- 2013–2023: Óscar Andrés Rodríguez Maradiaga SDB (former coordinator)
- 2013–2023: Giuseppe Bertello

== Former secretaries ==
- 2013–2020: Marcello Semeraro

=== Former adjunct secretaries ===
- 2018–2020: Marco Mellino (became secretary)
