= Dicastery for the Service of Charity =

Administrative unit of the Roman Curia

- Dicasterium servitio caritatis praepositum seu Eleemosynaria Apostolica
- Coat of arms of the Holy See

Dicastery overview
- Formed: June 5, 2022; 4 years ago
- Preceding Dicastery: Office of Papal Charities
- Type: Dicastery
- Headquarters: 00120 Vatican City State
- Dicastery executives: Luis Marín de San Martín, Prefect (Almoner); Lucio Adrián Ruiz, Secretary; Massimo Ralli, Under Secretary; Francesco Mazzitelli, Papal Charities Office Manager; Romanus Mbena, Head of the Office
- Website: www.elemosineria.va

The Dicastery for the Service of Charity (Italian: Dicastero per il servizio della carità, Latin: Dicasterium servitio caritatis praepositum seu Eleemosynaria Apostolica), also known as the Apostolic Alms Office, is an administrative unit of the Roman Curia. It began operations on 5 June 2022 as established by the apostolic constitution Praedicate evangelium promulgated on 19 March 2022. Before the reform of Praedicate evangelium it was named the Office of Papal Charities.

== Papal almoner ==
The origin of the office of papal almoner goes back to the first centuries of the church when deacons, then close associates of the pope, were responsible for distributing alms. A bull of Pope Innocent III cites the almoner as an existing position while the post of apostolic almoner was formally erected by Pope Gregory X in the 13th century.

Since the time of Pope Leo XIII, the almoner has also been responsible for selling the parchments with which he authenticates papal blessings with his signature. Sales of these documents provide the almoner's office with funds to be distributed as alms.

== Creation of the dicastery ==
It took on the responsibilities previously managed by the Office of Papal Charities, which had functioned as part of the papal household rather than as a curial department and was closely identified with the role of the Almoner of His Holiness, more commonly known as the papal almoner. The almoner's post had been used to reward senior prelates until Pope Francis made its transformation "a flagship initiative" of his papacy, increasing its budget and visibility, elevating his almoner to the rank of cardinal, and transforming the role of almoner into a curial office.

Discussing Praedicate evangelium when it was promulgated, Marco Mellino, secretary of the Council of Cardinal Advisers, said that it reorganized the Roman Curia to orient it to service rather than administration and that elevating the church's almsgiving function was a key part of this. While the Secretariat of State retained its preeminent role, the Dicastery for the Service of Charity was one of the three top-ranking units that followed in the Curia's hierarchy to reflect its core mission: evangelization, doctrine, and charity.

Like the other dicasteries under this constitution, the Dicastery for the Service of Charity is headed by a prefect, though in this instance the prefect also has the traditional title Almoner of His Holiness or papal almoner. The prefect enjoys an additional distinction: it is one of only two curial prefects who retain their authority during the sede vacante, the period between the end of one papacy and the beginning of the next. (Note: The other is the Apostolic Penitentiary, whose judicial functions entail the uninterruptible expression of mercy. The same principle is found in Pope John Paul II's revision of procedures for papal elections Universi Dominici gregis, article 22.) The principle is that the service of charity is never to be interrupted.

== Functions ==
The dicastery's work is rooted in "the option for the poor, the vulnerable and the excluded". It is authorized to provide assistance "anywhere in the world". The pope is expressly authorized to personally direct allocations "in cases of particular poverty or other necessity". The dicastery's remit extends as well to responding "in the event of serious calamities".

It is authorized to accept and to solicit donations to support its distribution of charity. One particular source of funding is the dicastery's authority to sell customized parchments that document papal blessings granted on special occasions, such as weddings, baptisms or priestly ordinations.

== Leadership ==
The Alms Office –both before and after its incorporation into the Curia as a dicastery – was led by Konrad Krajewski until 2026. The office has been managed by Francesco Mazzitelli since his appointment on 27 November 2021.

=== Papal almoners ===
- Francesco Bertazzoli (24 May 1802 – 30 December 1814)
- Xavier de Mérode (10 July 1866 – 11 July 1874)
- Alessandro Sanminiatelli Zabarella (31 July 1874 – 23 August 1887)
- Augusto Silj (26 December 1906 – 6 December 1916)
- Giovanni Nasalli Rocca di Corneliano (6 December 1916 – 21 November 1921)
- Carlo Cremonesi (29 December 1921 – 16 December 1935)
- Giuseppe Migone (19 December 1935 – 1 January 1951)
- Diego Venini (12 January 1951 – 16 December 1968)
- Antonio Maria Travia (16 December 1968 – 23 December 1989)
- Oscar Rizzato (23 December 1989 – 28 July 2007)
- Félix del Blanco Prieto (28 July 2007 - 3 November 2012)
- Guido Pozzo (3 November 2012 - 3 August 2013)
- Konrad Krajewski (3 August 2013 – 5 June 2022)

=== Prefect and papal almoner ===
- Konrad Krajewski (5 June 2022 – 12 March 2026)
- Luis Marín de San Martín, OSA (12 March 2026 – present)
