= Santa Maria Immacolata all'Esquilino =

- Church of Saint Mary Immaculate on the Esquiline
- Chiesa di Santa Maria Immacolata all'Esquilino
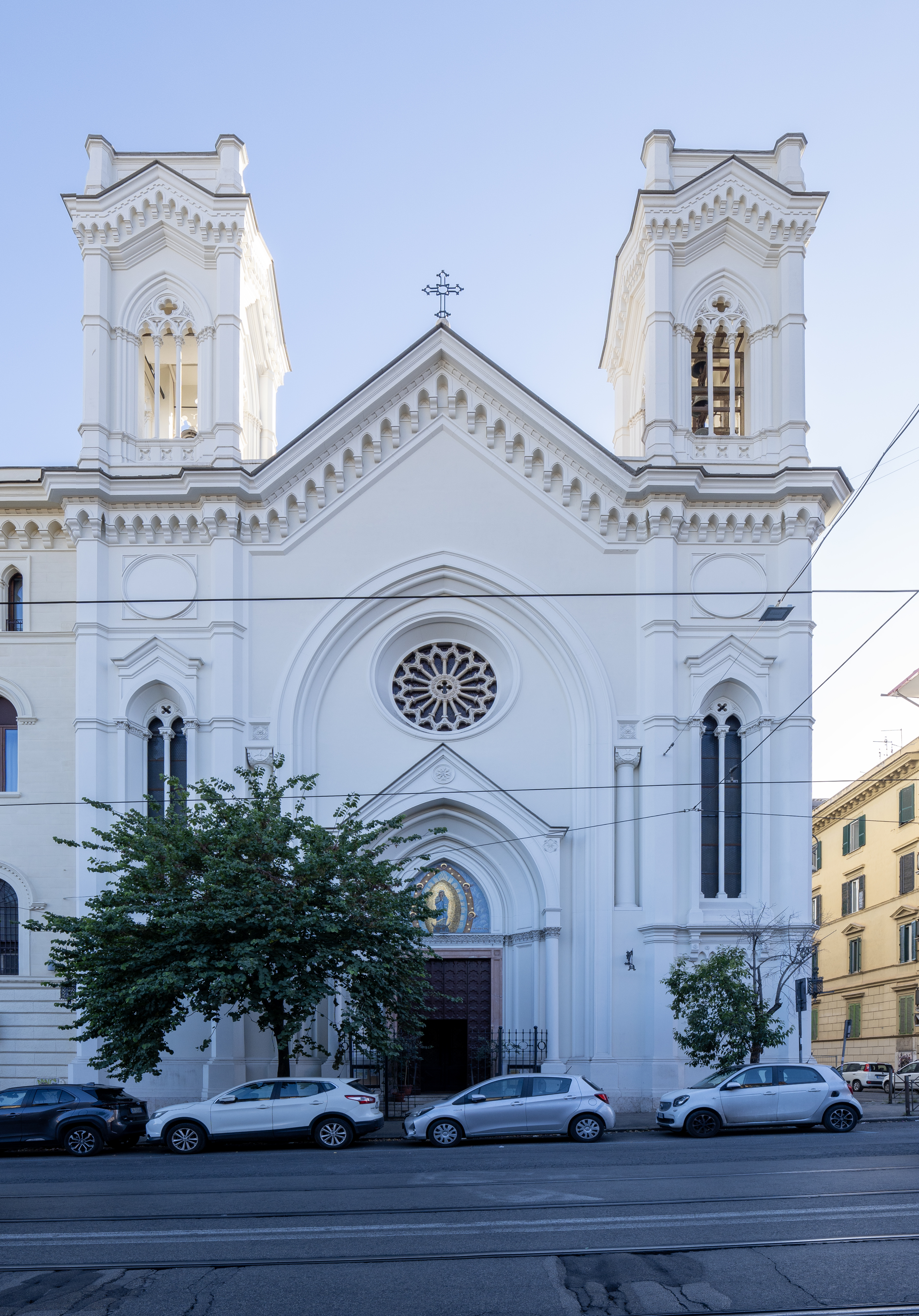
- Click on the map for a fullscreen view
- 41°53′28″N 12°30′22″E
- Location: Via Emanuele Filiberto 129, R. Esquilino, Rome
- Country: Italy
- Language: Italian
- Denomination: Catholic
- Tradition: Roman Rite
- Religious order: Frati della Carità (until 1973)
- Website: www.facebook.com/ChiesaSantaMariaImmacolataEsquilino/

History
- Status: titular church, parish church
- Dedication: Mary, mother of Jesus (as Holy Mary Immaculate)
- Consecrated: 21 April 1942

Architecture
- Functional status: active
- Architect: Antonio Cursi
- Architectural type: Gothic Revival
- Groundbreaking: 1896
- Completed: 1914

Administration
- Diocese: Rome

Santa Maria Immacolata all'Esquilino is a 20th-century parochial church and titular church on the Esquiline Hill in Rome, dedicated to the Mary Immaculate.

== History ==
Santa Maria Immacolata all'Esquilino was built in 1896–1914 in the Gothic Revival style for the Friars of Charity (Frati della Carità, Bigi). The Bigi broke up in 1973.

In 2017, it was reported that the schismatic Society of Saint Pius X was interested in purchasing the church, but no such purchase took place.

On 28 June 2018, it was made a titular church to be held by a cardinal-deacon.

Cardinal-Protectors

- Konrad Krajewski (2018–present)
