= Guido Pozzo =

The Most Reverend Guido Pozzo
- Economic Superintendent of the Sistine Choir
- Church: Roman Catholic Church
- Appointed: 19 January 2019
- Other post: Titular Archbishop of Balneoregium (2012-)
- Previous posts: Adjunct Secretary of the International Theological Commission (2003-09); Secretary of the Pontifical Commission "Ecclesia Dei" (2009-13; 2013-19); Almoner of the Office of Papal Charities (2012-13)

Orders
- Ordination: 24 September 1977 by Pietro Cocolin
- Consecration: 17 November 2012 by Tarcisio Bertone

Personal details
- Born: Guido Pozzo; 26 December 1951 (age 74) Trieste, Italy
- Education: Pontifical Gregorian University
- Motto: Servite Domino in laetitia
- Coat of arms

Styles of Guido Pozzo
- Reference style: The Most Reverend
- Spoken style: Your Excellency
- Religious style: Monsignor

Guido Pozzo (born 26 December 1951) is a Catholic prelate and an official of the Roman Curia.

== Biography ==
Pozzo was born near Trieste, Italy. He entered the Almo Collegio Capranica in 1970. He studied at the Pontifical Gregorian University in Rome, earning a license and then a doctorate in dogmatic theology.

On 24 September 1977 he was ordained a priest of the diocese of Trieste. In 1987 he became a member of the staff of the Congregation for the Doctrine of the Faith (CDF). Pozzo was appointed Prelate of Honour of His Holiness on 21 November 2004. A distinguished theologian, Pozzo is also a professor at the Lateran University and Adjunct Secretary of the International Theological Commission. Pope Benedict XVI named him secretary of the Pontifical Commission Ecclesia Dei on 8 July 2009, the day the Pope linked the Commission closely to the CDF, making the Congregation's Prefect also President of the Commission.

Pozzo headed the Vatican delegation that began discussions on 26 October 2009 with representatives of the Society of St. Pius X in the hope of resolving the doctrinal differences between them. The discussions proved difficult, but after several years Pozzo, now Secretary of the Commission, described them as "constructive".

On 3 November 2012, Pozzo was appointed Almoner of His Holiness and at the same time Titular Archbishop of Bagnoregio. He was consecrated on 17 November by Cardinal Secretary of State Tarcisio Cardinal Bertone, assisted by Archbishop Gerhard Ludwig Muller, then Prefect of the Congregation for the Doctrine of the Faith, and Giampaolo Crepaldi.

On 30 April 2013 he was named a Consultor to the Congregation of the Doctrine of the Faith (CDF). On 3 August 2013 he was released from his duties as Almoner and assigned once more to the Pontifical Commission Ecclesia Dei, now as Secretary.

Catholic Church titles
Preceded by Mario Marini	Secretary of the Pontifical Commission Ecclesia Dei; 8 July 2009 – 3 November 2012	Vacant Title next held by himself
Preceded by Félix del Blanco Prieto	Almoner of His Holiness; 3 November 2012 – 3 August 2013	Succeeded by Konrad Krajewski
Vacant Title last held by himself	Secretary of the Pontifical Commission Ecclesia Dei; 3 August 2013 – 19 January 2019	
