= Pastor bonus =

Apostolic constitution of John Paul II

Pastor bonus (Latin for 'The Good Shepherd') is an apostolic constitution promulgated by Pope John Paul II on 28 June 1988. It instituted a number of reforms in the process of running the central government of the Catholic Church.

The document's article 1 defines the Roman Curia as dicasteries and institutes supporting the Roman Pontiff "in the exercise of his supreme pastoral office" on behalf of the whole Church, including both the Latin and Eastern Catholic Churches.

It was abrogated and replaced by Praedicate evangelium (released on 19 March 2022 under Pope Francis) when it became effective on 5 June 2022.

== Background ==
Pastor bonus laid out in considerable detail the organization of the Roman Curia, specifying precisely the names and composition of each dicastery, and enumerating which competencies, or responsibilities, each dicastery was charged with overseeing. It replaced the previous governing document, Regimini Ecclesiae universae, which was released by Paul VI in 1967.

It delineated the roles of the Secretariat of State, Congregations, Tribunals, Pontifical Councils, Administrative Services and Pontifical Commissions of the Roman Curia. It also established the norms for the ad limina visits of bishops to Rome and the relationship between the Holy See and the particular Churches and episcopal conferences.

== Changes introduced ==
Among the changes formulated in the constitution was the re-integration of the Council for Public Affairs of the Church into the Secretariat of State as the Section for Relations with States (the Second Section). The Council for Public Affairs of the Church had previously been a section of the Secretariat of State, but was made an independent dicastery by Pope Paul VI in 1967.

The constitution also opened membership in dicasteries to priests, deacons, religious, and lay persons. For centuries, only cardinals were eligible for membership in the organs of the Holy See, but Pope Paul VI allowed diocesan bishops to be members following calls for collegiality at the Second Vatican Council. Pastor bonus continued the opening of the central government of the church by allowing representatives of all the faithful to have a role in the Roman Curia.

== Modifications to Pastor bonus ==
As of March 2016, Pastor bonus has been amended by Quaerit semper in 2011, Ministrorum institutio and Fides per doctrinam in 2013, and Confermando una tradizione in 2014.

In the Apostolic Letter Ministrorum institutio of 16 January 2013, Pope Benedict XVI transferred the governance of seminaries from the Congregation for Catholic Education to the Congregation for the Clergy. On the same day the Apostolic Letter Fides per doctrinam transferred the competence of catechesis from the Congregation for Clergy to the Pontifical Council for Promoting New Evangelization.

In October 2013, Pope Francis and his Council of Cardinals were reviewing Pastor bonus for possible further revisions. On 24 February 2014, Francis issued the Apostolic Letter Fidelis dispensator et prudens establishing the Council for the Economy to oversee the administrative and financial structures and activities of the dicasteries of the Roman Curia, the institutions linked to the Holy See, and the Vatican City State. It also established the Secretariat for the Economy as a dicastery of the Roman Curia.
