= Luis Marín de San Martín =

Spanish Catholic archbishop (born 1961)

The Most Reverend Luis Marín de San Martín OSA
- Prefect of the Dicastery for the Service of Charity and Almoner of His Holiness
- Church: Catholic Church
- Appointed: 12 March 2026
- Predecessor: Konrad Krajewski

Orders
- Ordination: 4 June 1988
- Consecration: 11 April 2021 by Carlos Osoro Sierra

Personal details
- Born: 21 August 1961 (age 64) Madrid, Spain
- Motto: Deus caritas est (Latin for 'God is love')
- Coat of arms

Luis Marín de San Martín (born 21 August 1961) is a Spanish Catholic prelate who has served as Prefect of the Dicastery for the Service of Charity since March 2026. He previously served as joint under-secretary for the Synod of Bishops from 2021 to 2026. He has also served as general assistant for the Order of Saint Augustine at their generalate in Rome.

== Biography ==
Marín de San Martín was born in Madrid on 21 August 1961). He attended Colegio San Agustín there, an Augustinian school. He made his first vows in the Order of Saint Augustine on 5 September 1982, and his solemn vows on 1 November 1985. He was ordained a priest on 4 June 1988. His first parish assignments were in the Madrid suburb of San Sebastián de los Reyes and in Madrid itself.

Marín de San Martín earned a doctorate in sacred theology at the Comillas Pontifical University. Within his order, he was: formator of the Tagaste Major Seminary in Los Negrales (1996-1999); provincial counsellor for Spain (1999-2002); prior of the monastery of Santa María de La Vid (2002-2008); and professor of theology in the Augustianian Centres in Los Negrales, San Lorenzo de El Escorial, and Valladolid. From 2004 to 2021, he was a visiting lecturer at the Facultad de Teología del Norte de España in Burgos.

From 2008 to 2021, he was archivist and general assistant of the Augustinians and president of the Institutum Spiritualitatis Augustinianae at the request of the prior general, Fr Robert Prevost, later Pope Leo XIV. From 2008 until Prevost left for Peru in 2014, Marín de San Martín and the future pope lived in the same Augustinian residence in Rome.

On 6 February 2021 Pope Francis appointed Marín de San Martín joint under-secretary of the Synod of Bishops along with Sr. Nathalie Becquart. At the same time, he was appointed Titular Bishop of Suliana. He was consecrated a bishop in Madrid's Almudena Cathedral on 11 April 2021 by Cardinal Carlos Osoro Sierra, with Cardinal Carlos Amigo Vallejo and Bishop Manuel Herrero Fernández as co-consecrators. In 2022, he described the development of synodality as "an irreversible process, with different speeds, full of nuances and in need of clarification, but with no turning back." He advised: "We should not be frightened by the different speeds, nor should we be anxious to achieve immediate results; the important thing is to assume a new, more coherent way of being Church, advancing serenely along this path of renewal and hope. If possible, with enthusiasm."

On 12 March 2026, Pope Leo XIV appointed Marín de San Martín Papal Almoner and Prefect of the Dicastery for the Service of Charity, naming him an archbishop at the same time.

== Works ==
He is the author of several books and publications:

- Agustinos: novedad y permanencia. Historia y espiritualidad de los orígenes (Madrid, 1990) ISBN 9788485364145
- Juan XXIII. Retrato eclesiológico (John XXIII: An Ecclesiological Portrait) (Barcelona, 1998) ISBN 9788425420634
- Los agustinos. Orígenes y Espiritualidad (The Augustinians: Origins and Spirituality) (Rome, 2009)
- Las Iglesias Orientales (The Eastern Churches) (Madrid, 2011)
- San Juan XXIII, Maestro espiritual (Saint John XXIII, Spiritual teacher) (Madrid, 2014) ISBN 9788497153010
