= Bruno Bertagna =

- Vice-President emeritus of the Pontifical Council for Legislative Texts
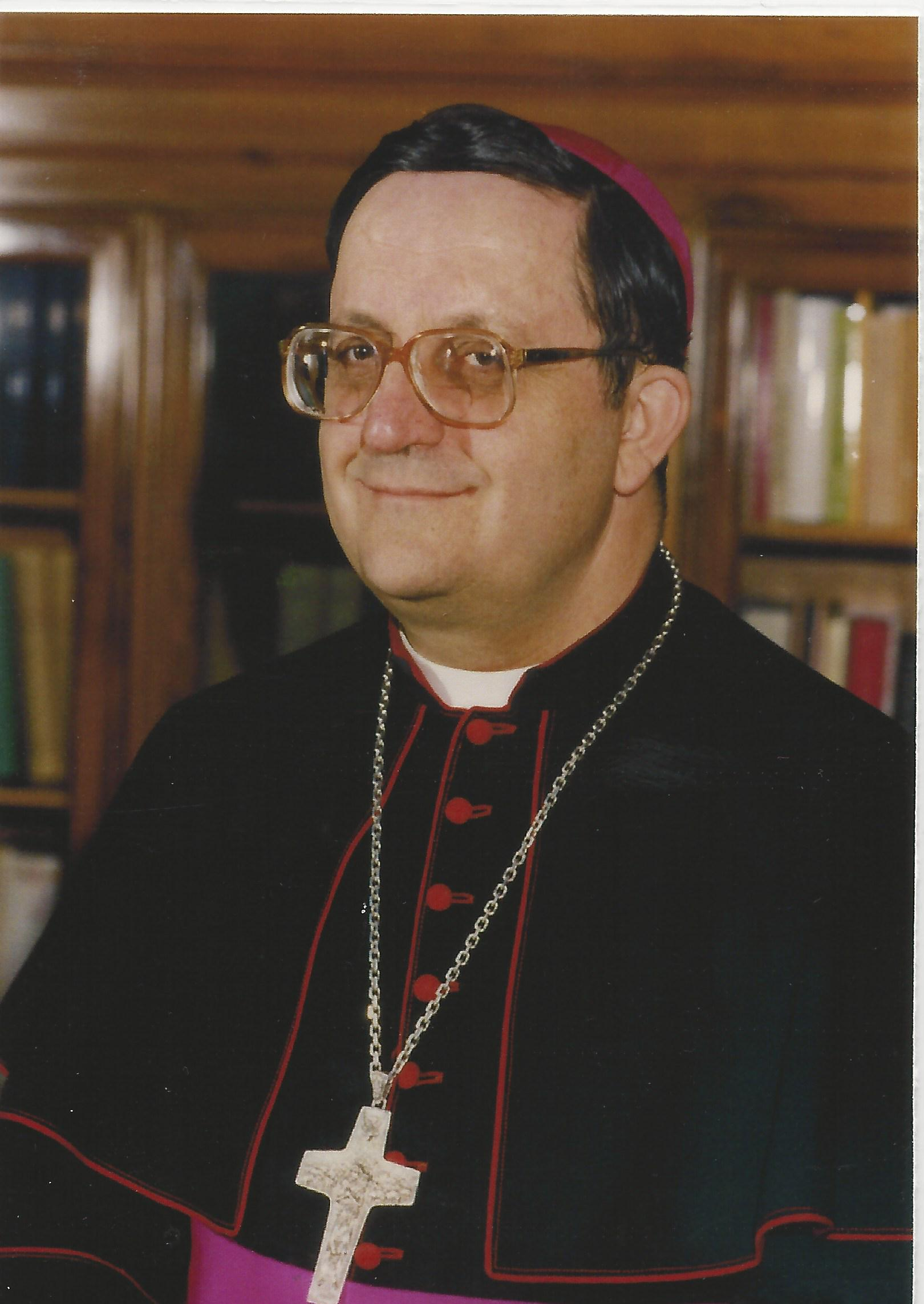
- Church: Catholic Church
- Appointed: 15 February 2007
- Term ended: 12 October 2010
- Predecessor: Bruno Bertagna
- Other post: Secretary of the Pontifical Council for Legislative Texts (1994–2007)

Orders
- Ordination: 23 May 1959
- Consecration: 6 January 1991 by Pope John Paul II
- Rank: Archbishop

Personal details
- Born: 12 October 1935 Tiedoli, Italy
- Died: 31 October 2013 (aged 78) Parma, Italy
- Motto: Auxilium a Domino
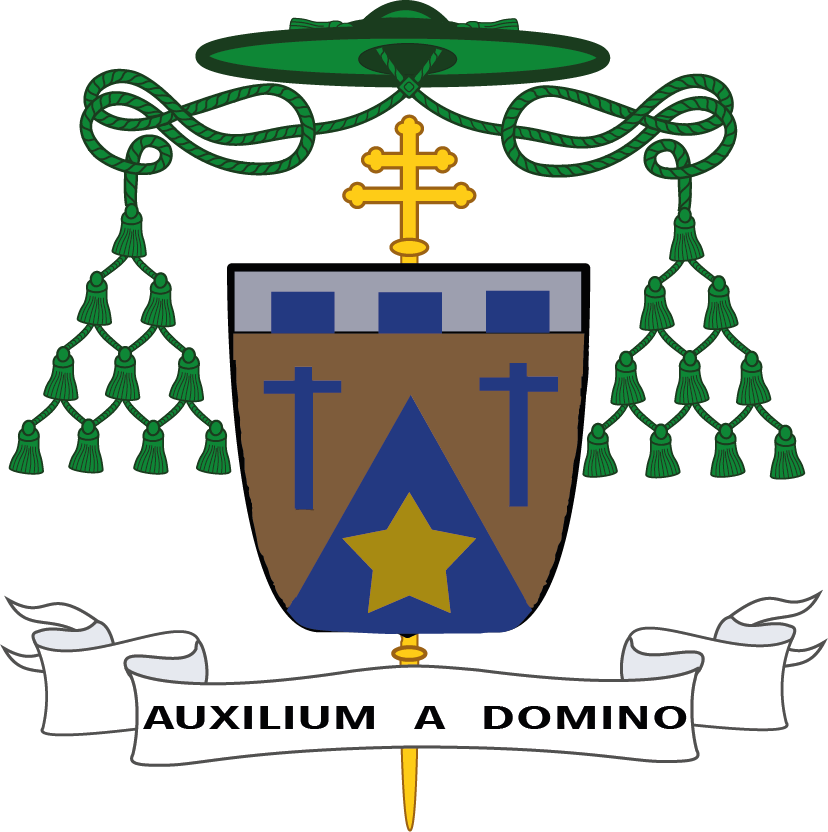
- Coat of arms

Bruno Bertagna (12 October 1935 − 31 October 2013) was an Italian prelate of the Catholic Church who worked in the Roman Curia. He became a bishop in 1991 and an archbishop in 2007. Between 1994 and 2007 he was Secretary of the Pontifical Council for Legislative Texts.

== Biography ==
Bruno Bertagna was born in Tiedoli, Italy, on 12 October 1935. He was ordained a priest of the Diocese of Piacenza-Bobbio on 23 May 1959. He did parish work for a few years and then studied in Rome, earning his doctorate in civil and canon law in 1997.

Pope John Paul II named him Secretary General of the Governatorate of Vatican City State on 6 April 1990.

On 15 December 1990, Pope John Paul appointed him titular bishop of Drivastum and he received his episcopal consecration on 6 January 1991 from Pope John Paul.

On 19 December 1994, Pope John Paul named him Secretary of the Pontifical Council for the Interpretation of Legislative Texts. On 20 November 2006, Pope Benedict XVI appointed him general auditor of the Apostolic Camera.

On 15 February 2007, Pope Benedict named him Vice President of that body and raised him to the rank of archbishop.

Bertagna retired on 12 October 2010 and died in a nursing home in Parma on 31 October 2013 at the age of 78. He was entombed in the Tiedoli cemetery.
