= Dicastery for Legislative Texts =

Roman Catholic dicastery

The Dicastery for Legislative Texts, formerly named Pontifical Council for Legislative Texts, is a dicastery of the Roman Curia. It is distinct from the highest tribunal or court in the Church, which is the Supreme Tribunal of the Apostolic Signatura, and does not have law-making authority to the degree the Pope and the Holy See's tribunals do. Its charge is the interpretation of existing canon laws, and it works closely with the Signatura and the other Tribunals and the Pope. Like the Signatura and the other two final appellate Tribunals, the Roman Rota and the Apostolic Penitentiary, it is led by a prefect who is a bishop or archbishop.

The current president of the Pontifical Council is Archbishop Anthony Randazzo, the current secretary is Bishop Juan Ignacio Arrieta Ochoa de Chinchetru.

== History and field of competence ==
On 14 May 1904, Pope Pius X created the Commission for the Codification of Canon Law. It produced the 1917 Code of Canon Law, promulgated by Pope Benedict XV on 27 May 1917 to take effect on 19 May 1918.

Pope Benedict then established the Pontifical Commission for Authentic Interpretation of the Code of Canon Law on 5 September 1917. On 28 March 1963, Pope John XXIII replaced it with the Pontifical Commission for the Revision of the Code of Canon Law, a revision called for by the Second Vatican Council. On 11 July 1967, Pope Paul VI established the Pontifical Commission for Interpretation of the Decrees of the Second Vatican Council and, two years later, extended its mandate to the interpretation of the documents issued by the Holy See to implement those decrees.

After promulgating a new version of the Code of Canon Law in January 1983, Pope John Paul II erected the Pontifical Commission for Authentic Interpretation of the Code of Canon Law once again on 2 January 1984. Its competence included with the universal laws for the Latin Rite within its purview. This Commission replaced those set up by his two predecessors. On 28 June 1988, the body was given its present name and its jurisdiction in the apostolic constitution Pastor Bonus.

On 18 October 1990, its competence was extended to interpreting the Code of Canons of the Eastern Churches and the laws shared in common by the Eastern Catholic Churches.

Pastor bonus states that the dicastery's work "consists mainly in interpreting the laws of the Church". (Pastor Bonus, 154).

Praedicate evangelium renamed the organ to Dicastery for Legislative Texts.

== Presidents ==
Pontifical Commission for Authentic Interpretation of the Code of Canon Law

- Pietro Gasparri (Note: Two self-published websites provide inconsistent data for the succession to this office between 1930 and 1936, either self-contradictory or in conflict with official sources. A third appears the most reliable. The idea that Sincero became president in 1930 is contradicted by both Gasparri's identification as president at his death 1934 in the AAS necrology and the fact that Sincero was named a member of this Commission on 3 December 1930 The only date not documented by AAS is that of Serafini's appointment.) (15 September 1917 – 18 November 1934)
- Luigi Sincero (12 December 1934 – 7 February 1936)
- Giulio Serafini (1936? – 16 July 1938)
- Massimo Massimi (14 March 1939 – 29 May 1946)
- Pietro Ciriaci (31 May 1955 – 6 April 1963)

Pontifical Commission for the Revision of the Code of Canon Law

- Pietro Ciriaci (6 April 1963 – 30 December 1966)
- Pericle Felici (Note: Felici was also named President of the Pontifical Commission for the Interpretation of the Decrees of the Second Vatican Council. The creation of that body and his presidency appeared in the Acta Apostolicae Sedis undated in November 1967.) (21 February 1967 – 22 March 1982)
- Rosalio José Castillo Lara, SDB (17 May 1982 – 18 January 1984)

Pontifical Commission for Authentic Interpretation of the Code of Canon Law

- Rosalio José Castillo Lara, SDB (18 January 1984 – 6 December 1989)

Pontifical Council for Legislative Texts

- Vincenzo Fagiolo (15 December 1990 – 19 December 1994)
- Julián Herranz Casado (19 December 1994 – 15 February 2007)
- Francesco Coccopalmerio (15 February 2007 – 7 April 2018)
- Filippo Iannone (7 April 2018 – 26 September 2025)
- Anthony Randazzo (25 March 2026 - current)

== Secretaries ==
Pontifical Commission for Authentic Interpretation of the Code of Canon Law

- Luigi Sincero (15 September 1917 – 23 May 1923)
- Giuseppe Bruno (14 February 1924 – 16 February 1946)
- Gabriel Acacius Coussa, BA (3 March 1946 – 13 August 1961)
- Giacomo Violardo (2 April 1962 – 6 April 1963)

Pontifical Commission for the Revision of the Code of Canon Law

- Giacomo Violardo (6 April 1963 – 26 January 1965)
- Raimondo Bidagor, S.J. (Note: In 1962, Bigador was secretary of the Congregation for the Discipline of the Sacraments. He was also teaching canon law at the Pontifical Gregorian University when named secretary to the Commission for Revisions in 1965. He served as the Commission's spokesperson when changes to the procedures for annulments were announced in June 1971.) (24 February 1965 – 1973)
- Rosalio José Castillo Lara, S.D.B. (20 February 1975 – 17 May 1982)

Pontifical Commission for Authentic Interpretation of the Code of Canon Law

- Julián Herranz Casado (19 January 1984 – 19 December 1994)

Pontifical Council for Legislative Texts

- Bruno Bertagna (19 December 1994 – 15 February 2007)
- Juan Ignacio Arrieta Ochoa de Chinchetru (15 February 2007 – present)

== See also ==
- Authentic interpretation
- 1917 Code of Canon Law
- 1983 Code of Canon Law
