= Pontifical council =

Organization within the Roman Curia

A pontifical council was a mid-sized department or dicastery of the Roman Curia, the central organization responsible for assisting the Pope in the governance and oversight of the Catholic Church. Such a council had a cardinal or archbishop as its president and was restricted in its activities in comparison with the larger parts of the Curia.

== List of pontifical councils ==
The former pontifical councils were:

- Pontifical Council for Culture (20 May 1982)
- Pontifical Council for Interreligious Dialogue (19 May 1964, renamed 28 June 1988)
- Pontifical Council for Legislative Texts (5 September 1917, renamed 28 June 1988)
- Pontifical Council for Promoting Christian Unity (5 June 1960, renamed 28 June 1988)
- Pontifical Council for Promoting the New Evangelization (28 June 2010)
- Pontifical Council Cor Unum, established 15 July 1971
- Pontifical Council for Justice and Peace, established 6 January 1967, renamed 28 June 1988
- Pontifical Council for the Pastoral Care of Health Care Workers, established 11 February 1985
- Pontifical Council for the Pastoral Care of Migrants and Itinerants, established 28 June 1988

Pope Francis has undertaken a reorganization of the Roman Curia that has eliminated several councils by incorporating their activities into parts of the curia with broader responsibilities. On 29 June 2016, the Pontifical Council for Social Communications, which was created on 30 January 1948, was assumed by the Secretariat for Communications. On 1 September 2016, the Pontifical Council for the Family, established 9 May 1981, and the Pontifical Council for the Laity, established 6 January 1967, were assumed by the Dicastery for the Laity, Family and Life. On 1 January 2017, these four pontifical councils were assumed by the Dicastery for Promoting Integral Human Development.

Since Praedicate evangelium entered into force (5 June 2022), there are no more active pontifical councils.
