= Pontifical Council for Promoting the New Evangelization =

Former body of the Roman Curia (2010–2022)

The Pontifical Council for Promoting the New Evangelization (Latin: Pontificium Consilium de Nova Evangelizatione), also translated as Pontifical Council for Promoting New Evangelization, was a pontifical council of the Roman Curia whose creation was announced by Pope Benedict XVI at vespers on 28 June 2010, eve of the Solemnity of Saints Peter and Paul, to carry out the New Evangelization. On 5 June 2022, the department was merged into the Dicastery for Evangelization.

The Pope said that "the process of secularization has produced a serious crisis of the sense of the Christian faith and role of the Church", and the new pontifical council would "promote a renewed evangelization" in countries where the Church has long existed "but which are living a progressive secularization of society and a sort of 'eclipse of the sense of God'."

On 30 June 2010, Pope Benedict XVI appointed as its first President Archbishop Salvatore Fisichella, until then President of the Pontifical Academy for Life. On 13 May 2011, Pope Benedict XVI named Archbishop Jose Octavio Ruiz Arenas as the first Secretary of the Pontifical Council. Archbishop Ruiz Arenas had been serving as the Vice President of the Pontifical Commission for Latin America and had served as the Archbishop of the Roman Catholic Archdiocese of Villavicencio in Villavicencio, Colombia. The 66-year-old prelate is a native of Colombia. That same day, Monsignor Graham Bell, formerly the Secretary Coordinator of the Pontifical Academy for Life, was named the Undersecretary of the Pontifical Council.

On Friday, 25 January 2013, Pope Benedict XVI, in an Apostolic Letter issued Motu Proprio (on his own initiative), transferred the oversight of catechesis from the Congregation for the Clergy to the Pontifical Council for the Promotion of the New Evangelization (catechesis is the use of catechists, clergy, and other individuals to teach and inform those in the Church, those interested in the Church, and catechumens- those joining the Church through Baptism and/or Confirmation- about the faith and its structure and tenets).

== Origin ==
The idea for a Council for the New Evangelization was first floated by Father Luigi Giussani, founder of the Communion and Liberation movement, in the early 1980s. Pope John Paul II emphasized the universal call to holiness and called Catholics to engage in the New Evangelization. More recently, Cardinal Angelo Scola of Venice presented the idea to Benedict XVI.

The term "new evangelization" was popularized by Pope John Paul II with reference to efforts to reawaken the faith in traditionally Christian parts of the world, particularly Europe, first "evangelized", or converted to Christianity, many centuries earlier, but then standing in need of a "new evangelization".

== Establishment ==
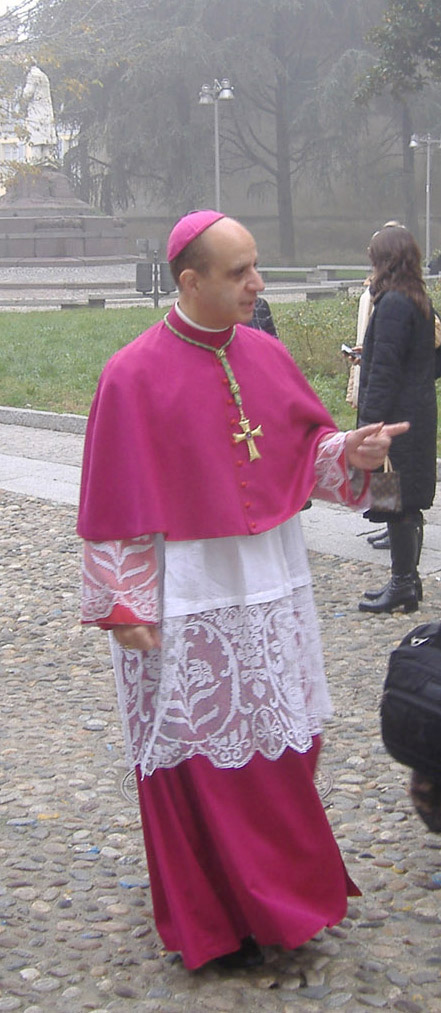
Archbishop Rino Fisichella, Pro-Prefect for the Section of New Evangelization of the Dicastery for Evangelization, 2006.

Pope Benedict XVI established the council with Art. 1 §1 of the motu proprio Ubicumque et semper, given from Castel Gandolfo 21 September 2010 and published in the L'Osservatore Romano 12 October 2010.

The incipit of the document is part of the phrase: "The Church has a duty everywhere and at all times to proclaim the Gospel of Jesus Christ". Pope Benedict quoted Pope Paul VI who stated that the work of evangelization "proves equally increasingly necessary because of the frequent situations of de-Christianization of our days, for multitudes of people who have been baptized but who live quite outside of Christian life, for simple people who have a certain faith, but he knows the basics wrong, for intellectuals who feel the need to know Jesus Christ in a different light from the teaching they received as children, and for many others ".

The document lists the specific tasks of the Council which include:

- deepen the theological and pastoral significance of the new evangelization;
- promote and encourage, in close collaboration with the Episcopal Conferences concerned, that can have an ad hoc body, study, dissemination and implementation of the papal magisterium on matters related to the new evangelization;
- raise awareness and support activities related to the new evangelization which are being applied in various particular Churches and to promote the realization of new, actively involving the resources of the Institutes of Consecrated Life and Societies of Apostolic Life, as well as in associations of the faithful and new community;
- study and promote the use of modern forms of communication, as tools for the new evangelization;
- promote the use of the Catechism of the Catholic Church as an essential and comprehensive formulation of the content of faith to the people of our time.

Presenting the new Council to the press, Archbishop Fisichella said: "The Gospel is not a myth, but the living witness of an historical event that changed the face of history." He added: "The new evangelization first and foremost makes known the historical person of Jesus, and his teachings as they have been faithfully transmitted by the original community, teachings that find in the Gospels and in the writings of the New Testament their normative expression."

=== Hierarchy of the Council ===
- President:
  - Salvatore Fisichella (30 June 2010 – present)
- Secretary:
  - José Ruiz Arenas (13 May 2011 – present)
- Undersecretary:
  - Mgsr. Graham Bell (13 May 2011 – present)

=== Members of the Council ===
Council members participate in the discussions of the council and attend yearly plenary meetings in Rome. They serve five-year terms renewable until their 80th birthday.

- Cardinals
  - Christoph Schönborn (5 January 2011-)
  - Angelo Scola (5 January 2011-)
  - George Pell (5 January 2011-)
  - Josip Bozanić (5 January 2011-)
  - Marc Ouellet (5 January 2011-)
  - Francisco Robles Ortega (5 January 2011-)
  - Odilo Pedro Scherer (5 January 2011-)
  - Stanisław Ryłko (5 January 2011-)
  - Gianfranco Ravasi (29 December 2010 -)
  - Daniel Fernando Sturla Berhouet, S.D.B., (13 April 2015 -)
- Archbishops and bishops
  - Claudio Maria Celli (5 January 2011-)
  - Nikola Eterović (5 January 2011-)
  - Pierre-Marie Carré (5 January 2011-)
  - Robert Zollitsch (5 January 2011-)
  - Bruno Forte (5 January 2011-)
  - Bernard Longley (5 January 2011-)
  - Andre-Joseph Leonard (5 January 2011-)
  - Adolfo González Montes (5 January 2011-)
  - Vincenzo Paglia (5 January 2011-)

== See also ==
- Evangelicalism in Italy

== Bibliography ==
- Pontifical Council for the Promotion of the New Evangelization, Libreria Editrice Vaticana (2015). Compendium on the new evangelization : texts of the Pontifical and Conciliar Magisterium, 1939-2012. USCCB Communications. p. 1136. ISBN 978-1601373960.
- Grogan, P; Kim, Kirsteen, K., eds. (2015). The New Evangelization: Faith, People, Context and Practice. Bloomsburry T&T Clark, London. .
- Orta, Andrew (2004). Catechizing Culture: Missionaries, Aymara, and the "New Evangelization". Columbia University Press, New York. .
- Pontifical Council for Promoting the New Evangelization. Year of Faith 2012–2013 (website). .
