= Marco Mellino =

Italian Catholic prelate (born 1966)

The Most Reverend Marco Mellino
- Adjunct Secretary of the Dicastery for Legislative Texts
- See: Cresima
- Appointed: 27 November 2025
- Predecessor: Marcello Semeraro
- Other post: Titular Bishop of Cresima
- Previous posts: Secretary of the Council of Cardinals (2020-2025), Adjunct Secretary of the Council of Cardinals (2018–2020)

Orders
- Ordination: 29 June 1991 by Bishop Giulio Nicolini
- Consecration: 15 December 2018 by Pietro Parolin

Personal details
- Born: 3 August 1966 (age 59) Canale, Italy
- Denomination: Roman Catholic
- Motto: Mihi vivere Christus (My life is Christ)
- Coat of arms

Marco Mellino (born 3 August 1966) is an Italian prelate of the Catholic Church who serves as Secretary of the Council of Cardinals. He has been a titular bishop since 2018, and worked as Adjunct Secretary to that Council from 2018 to 2020. He has worked as a parish priest, trained as a canon lawyer, and spent significant time working in the Vatican's Secretariat of State.

== Biography ==
Marco Mellino was born on 3 August 1966 in Canale, Italy. He entered the seminary in Alba in 1978. After earning his diploma there he earned a bachelor's degree in theology at the Interdiocesan Theological Studium of Fossano. He was ordained a priest of the Diocese of Alba on 29 June 1991 and fulfilled pastoral assignments in the parish of the Sacred Heart of Jesus in Santo Stefano Belbo until 1997. He studied in Rome at the Pontifical Lateran University from 1997 to 2000, earning a licentiate in canon law in 1999 and a doctorate in canon law in 2000.

He returned to his home diocese to work as pastor of the parish of the Immaculate Conception in Piana Biglini and prosecuting judge at the Piedmont Regional Ecclesiastical Tribunal, based in Turin. He also taught canon law at the Interdiocesan Theological Studium in Fossano. From 2009 to 2018 he served as an external judge at the Court of Appeals of the Vicariate of Rome. From September 2006 to June 2018 he worked in the Section for General Affairs of the Secretariat of State and then returned to serve for a few months as vicar general in Alba.

Pope Francis appointed him Adjunct Secretary of the Council of Cardinals and Titular Bishop of Cresima on 27 October 2018. He named a member of the Pontifical Council for Legislative Texts. He was consecrated on 15 December 2018 at Alba Cathedral. Cardinal Pietro Parolin was the principal consecrator and Bishop Marcello Semeraro and Bishop Marco Brunetti were co–consecrators. Unlike the Secretary to that Council, who had other duties as Bishop of Albano, the Council was Mellino's only assignment; his appointment was thus interpreted as a sign of the pope's desire to "stabilize" this relatively new organ of papal governance.

On 15 October 2020, Pope Francis named Mellino Secretary of the Council of Cardinals.

He was secretary of the Interdicasterial Commission for the Revision of the General Regulations of the Roman Curia from 2022 until 2025.

On 27 November 2025 he was appointed Adjunct Secretary of the Dicastery for Legislative Texts.
