= Consilium =

Vatican body that prepared the post-conciliar revision of the Roman Rite liturgy (1964-1970)

- Consilium ad exsequendam Constitutionem de Sacra Liturgia
- Emblem of the Holy See

- Members of the Consilium assembled for a plenary meeting

Pontifical commission overview
- Formed: January 25, 1964
- Dissolved: 1970
- Superseding Pontifical commission: Congregation for Divine Worship
- Jurisdiction: Catholic Church
- Headquarters: Rome, Italy
- Pontifical commission executives: Giacomo Lercaro, President (1964-1968); Benno Gut, President (1968-1970); Carlo Confalonieri, Vice-president; Annibale Bugnini, Secretary
- Parent department: Holy See

The Consilium, officially the Consilium ad exsequendam Constitutionem de Sacra Liturgia ("Council for the Implementation of the Constitution on the Sacred Liturgy"), was a body created by Pope Paul VI in January 1964 to carry out the revision of the liturgical books of the Roman Rite called for by the Second Vatican Council's constitution Sacrosanctum Concilium. Annibale Bugnini was told on 3 January 1964 that he would be its secretary, a letter from the Secretariat of State dated 13 January gave the body its name, and the motu proprio Sacram Liturgiam, dated 25 January and published in L'Osservatore Romano on 29 January, made its creation public.

Under its president, Cardinal Giacomo Lercaro, the Consilium worked through study groups (coetus) of consultors who drafted revised rites. Drafts went to a meeting of the groups' rapporteurs, then to plenary sessions of the Consilium's cardinal and bishop members, then to the pope, and were promulgated in the name of the Sacred Congregation of Rites. Its output included the instruction Inter Oecumenici (1964), three additional Eucharistic prayers in 1968, and the revised Order of Mass with its General Instruction in 1969. After the Congregation of Rites was divided on 8 May 1969 the Consilium continued as a special commission inside the new Congregation for Divine Worship; it held its last plenary meeting on 9-10 April 1970, when Paul VI told its members that it was being dismissed.

The Consilium's work drew criticism during and after its existence. An experimental rite known as the Missa normativa was presented to the 1967 Synod of Bishops and received a divided response, and the new Order of Mass was attacked in the 1969 Ottaviani Intervention. Critics allege that Bugnini manipulated the Consilium's proceedings, and that this was one of many reasons for his removal from posts in 1962 and 1975.

== Background ==
=== Pius XII's Reform ===
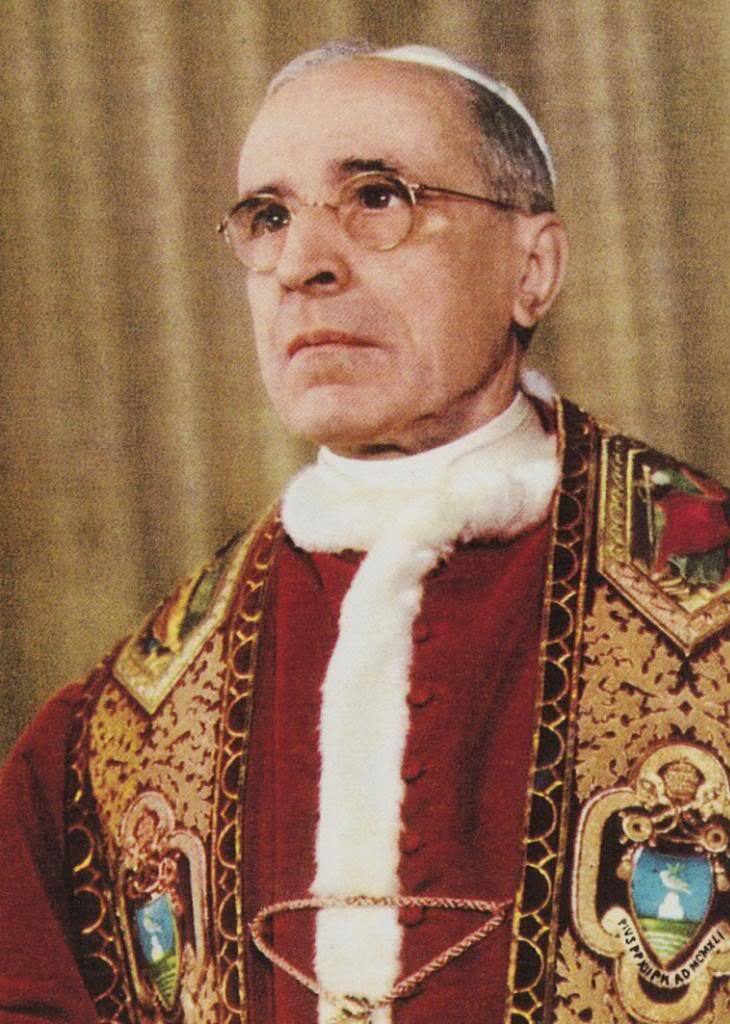
Pictured is Pope Pius XII (r. 1939–1958), whose reforms to Holy Week laid the groundwork for modern Catholic liturgical reform

Proposals for a general reform of the liturgy was not novel in 1963. After the Historical Section of the Sacred Congregation of Rites prepared a Promemoria on the subject in 1946, Pope Pius XII asked for a more concrete plan, and on 28 May 1948 a Pontifical Commission for the Reform of the Liturgy was named under Cardinal Clemente Micara. Its six original members were Alfonso Carinci, Ferdinando Antonelli, Joseph Löw, Anselmo Albareda, Augustin Bea and Annibale Bugnini, the then- editor of the journal Ephemerides Liturgicae; the members were bound to strict secrecy. Bugnini was proposed as its secretary at the second meeting, in November 1949, and Aimé-Georges Martimort, who knew him from the 1940s, believed the proposal came from Antonelli.

The commission worked from a Memoria sulla riforma liturgica that Löw had drafted with Antonelli, who signed it, and that was printed in 1948-1949; the minutes show it meeting 82 times between 1948 and 1960. Its results were somewhat partial; the restored Easter Vigil was decreed 9 February 1951, first as an optional experiment, and then permanently in 1956; the reformed rites of Holy Week took effect Palm Sunday 1955, a simplification of the rubrics occurred in 1955 and 1960, the instruction on sacred music (Note: Not to be confused with Musicae Sacrae, 1955; but De musica sacra et sacra liturgia issued by the Sacred Congregation of Rites approved by Pius XII) in 1958 and a staged rite for adult baptism in 1962. The calendar and the Divine Office were studied at length but not completed before the Second Vatican Council was announced in 1959. Scholars on liturgical reform such as Alcuin Reid, accepts that these reforms were carried out with care but argues that the tenet of compromise between innovation and conservation they relied on was not a sound basis for liturgical reform. Martimort noted that Bugnini's own history of Pius XII's reform period was brief, and that the commission's work was unknown to the members of the later preparatory commission until Cardinal Bea mentioned it in the Council hall in October 1962.

=== The preparatory commission and the liturgical schema ===
Less than three months into his pontificate, Pope John XXIII announced his intention to call an ecumenical council in January 1959, and in 1960 he created a preparatory commission on the liturgy under Cardinal Gaetano Cicognani, the Prefect of the Congregation of Rites. Bugnini became its secretary, again on Antonelli's suggestion, according to Antonelli himself. At its first meeting, on 12 November 1960, Bugnini divided the members and consultors into subcommissions, each handling the requests for reform that had come from the bishops and universities; the subcommission on Latin finished a report that Bugnini withdrew from the plenary agenda in April 1961 to avoid attacks he expected from the Roman Curia, and the question of language was instead dealt with in several places in the text. Cicognani signed the schema on 1 February 1962 and died on 5 February.

The new prefect of Rites, Cardinal Arcadio Larraona, presented the schema to the Central Preparatory Commission, which praised it but amended it. Bugnini later blamed Larraona, Antonelli and Löw for changes that altered its sense; Martimort, who took part in the preparatory work, recorded that he had found no precise evidence for this. The Council discussed the schema in 15 general congregations in October and November 1962. According to Antonelli's later tally the Fathers made 662 interventions on it, 85 votes were taken on amendments, and the final text was approved on 4 December 1963 by 2,147 votes to 4.

=== Bugnini's removal in 1962 ===
Archbishop Annibale Bugnini, architect of the Novus Ordo; whose specialized drafting system came to be known by critics and historians as the "Bugnini method"

Bugnini was not carried over from the preparatory commission to the conciliar commission on the liturgy. After Larraona became prefect of Rites in February 1962 he named Antonelli, not Bugnini, as secretary of the conciliar commission; Larraona's note informing Antonelli is dated 4 October 1962, the feast of St Francis, and Antonelli received it the next day. Bugnini remained a peritus but, in Martimort's words, attended in silence and spoke once, on a point of procedure; he was also removed from his teaching of liturgy at the Lateran institute. Yves Chiron, drawing on Bugnini's own report, relates that Larraona thought him too hasty and iconoclastic, and quotes a letter from the Lateran saying the measure came on orders from the Holy See.

What the sources say about the reasons is thin. Bugnini attributed his removal to Larraona and wrote that Pope John XXIII made a few gestures in his favor without result, while Lercaro and Bea intervened on his behalf. Antonelli's diary records a conversation in which Bugnini reacted angrily, said that malicious people must have misrepresented him to the cardinal, and complained that Larraona had never summoned him; Antonelli answered only that he had been presented with a nomination already signed. Martimort and others in the commission saw it as an affront by the Curia to the preparatory commission and its secretary, and Martimort's own account notes that the Curia had objected to the schema on grounds besides language. None of these accounts documents a decision or a stated reason from John XXIII. Pope Paul VI, elected in June 1963, called Bugnini back within months; on 11 October 1963 he had him help Lercaro assemble a small group to prepare a first application of the constitution.

=== What Sacrosanctum Concilium called for ===
The constitution set out principles rather than a specific new rite, and its provisions were narrower than the reform eventually produced. It asked that the liturgical books be revised "as soon as possible" by experts after consulting bishops of different regions (¶ 25), that innovations not be introduced unless the Church genuinely and certainly required them and that new forms grow "in some way organically" from existing ones (¶ 23), and that no one, even a priest, add, remove or change anything in the liturgy on his own authority (¶ 22 §3). For the Mass it asked that the rites be made simpler, that duplications and later additions of little use be dropped and that lost elements be restored "according to the ancient norm of the Fathers" where this seemed useful or necessary, while keeping the substance of the rites (¶ 50). Latin was to be preserved in the Latin rites, with a wider place for the vernacular especially in readings, directions and some prayers and chants, within limits set by the territorial authority and confirmed by the Holy See (¶ 36); the faithful were to be able to say or sing in Latin the parts of the Mass that belong to them (¶ 54). The text does not itself mention celebration facing the people, the omission of the Last Gospel, or the composition of new Eucharistic prayers; these questions were settled in the later work of the Consilium and the Holy See.

== Establishment and mandate ==
In December 1963 Paul VI asked Antonelli, still secretary of the conciliar commission, for a plan to revise the liturgical books. Antonelli's promemoria of 19 December proposed fourteen study groups and a small directing body that would be neither the Congregation of Rites nor the conciliar commission, and named possible members and institutions for each task. The Consilium that was created in January was not exactly what he had described, and its relation to the Congregation of Rites was never settled to the satisfaction of both sides. On 3 January 1964 Bugnini learned of his appointment; on 13 January the Secretariat of State named the Consilium, with Cardinals Lercaro, Paolo Giobbe and Larraona as its first members; and the three met on 15 January to examine a draft motu proprio prepared by Cardinal Pericle Felici. Sacram Liturgiam appeared with the date 25 January. Its article on the competence of the episcopal conferences provoked protests from bishops in several countries and a corrected text was published in the Acta Apostolicae Sedis.

The Consilium's powers were defined in a letter from the Secretariat of State dated 29 February 1964. Bugnini records that a later letter of 7 January 1965 gave the Consilium responsibility for the experimental phase of each reform, while the Congregation of Rites gave the results juridical force. In practice this meant two bodies with overlapping interests. Antonelli, who was secretary of the Congregation of Rites and had also been appointed a member of the Consilium on 26 February 1964, argued that the Consilium was a study body and the Congregation the organ of government, and in March 1964 he noted that the Consilium was behaving as if it were the latter. Marini, who served as Bugnini's secretary and later wrote a history of the Consilium, makes the conflict with the Congregation a recurring subject, with Inter Oecumenici as the clearest case.

Inter Oecumenici, the first instruction, was prepared by the Consilium, revised by the Congregation of Rites, agreed at a joint meeting on 21 September 1964 and promulgated on 26 September with the pope's explicit approval; its provisions took effect on 7 March 1965. The formula for promulgating later documents followed this pattern. Paul VI never gave the Consilium formal statutes, a point Martimort thought left it exposed to quarrels of competence. The reorganization of the Curia in the constitution Regimini Ecclesiae (15 August 1967) kept the Congregation of Rites with its double competence for worship and the causes of saints, kept the Consilium as a provisional body, and made its conclusions subject to the Congregation's plenary meeting. To end the friction the pope asked for the resignation of Larraona and of Lercaro, and on 9 January 1968 he put Cardinal Benno Gut at the head of both bodies.

== Membership and organization ==
The Consilium began with a list of 42 members, almost all bishops, which Bugnini presented on 15 February 1964 and which was published on 5 March; the members were summoned for 11 March, and the number later rose to a maximum of 51. Bugnini asked Johannes Wagner and Martimort for suggestions in compiling it. Cardinal Carlo Confalonieri was named vice-president at the first meeting. Members met in plenary session about twice a year for a fortnight or so. The consultors, whose number eventually reached about 150, were organized in study groups; Martimort counts 26 groups that actually worked (nine on the Divine Office, ten on the Missal, three on the Pontifical, three on the Ritual) out of 39 planned, while Chiron counts 45 in all. Protestant observers were first admitted to a plenary meeting in October 1966, and in April 1967 the Consilium heard Max Thurian at the request of several bishops.

Drafts followed a set route. One or more study groups wrote a schema; the rapporteurs of the groups examined it; the revised text went to the plenary session, where discussion could lead to further revision, and then the members voted on specific questions put to them. Each rite was supposed to be tried in designated places before adoption. Chiron's biography counts 439 schemata prepared between 1964 and 1975 and stresses that Bugnini had far readier access to the pope than Lercaro did. This system had critics inside of it. After a March 1964 meeting that only 13 of the 42 members attended, Antonelli complained of hurried discussion and approval by atmosphere, and in April 1967 he wrote that schemata (drafts), including the new Eucharistic prayers, reached members the evening before they were debated, that votes were taken by show of hands which nobody counted, that nobody had settled whether an absolute or a two-thirds majority was required, and that no minutes were kept or read. Martimort, who attended the Consilium throughout, wrote instead that its debates were sometimes sharp, that schemata were returned for rewriting, and that it was "not a simple registration chamber".

Selected documents resulting from the Consilium's work, 1964-1970
Date	Document	Subject
26 September 1964	Inter Oecumenici	First instruction on applying the constitution
March 1965	Rite of concelebration and Communion under both kinds	Concelebration; chalice for the faithful in specified cases
5 March 1967	Musicam sacram	Sacred music
4 May 1967	Tres abhinc annos	Second instruction on applying the constitution
25 May 1967	Eucharisticum mysterium	Eucharistic worship
23 May 1968	Preces eucharisticae	Three Eucharistic prayers alongside the Roman Canon
19 March 1969	Rite of marriage	Ritual
3 April 1969	Ordo Missae and Institutio Generalis Missalis Romani	Order of Mass; General Instruction
9-25 May 1969	Calendar; rite of baptism of children; Ordo lectionum Missae	Calendar; ritual; lectionary
26 March 1970	Complete Missale Romanum	Revised Roman Missal

== Experiments ==
An American "Hootenanny Mass", c. 1965, during the period of widespread post-conciliar liturgical experimentation

Pope Paul VI concelebrating Mass with 24 prelates at the opening of the third session of the Second Vatican Council, 14 September 1964, alluding to the wider restoration of concelebration under the postconciliar reform

Experiments were part of the method from the start. Bugnini's own account, which separates experiments authorized and supervised by the Consilium from those undertaken without authority, notes that the Consilium issued rules for the first kind and complained of the second. The authorized trials were meant to be limited and to test whether a rite worked. For Instance, On 19 June 1964,, members of the Consilium were invited to the abbey church of Sant'Anselmo for a concelebrated sung pontifical Mass with twenty concelebrants, which lasted about an hour and a quarter; Antonelli thought it positive overall but questioned where the concelebrants stood and whether they should extend the right hand at the consecration. The concelebration rite that came from this work appeared in March 1965 and, Martimort thought, did as much as the vernacular to renew the quality of celebrations.

Tests of the Mass itself were more troublesome. At the Consilium's October 1965 session the first project of the study group on the Mass was tried out, which, in Martimort's account, led to disturbances that the Italian press reported; Pope Paul VI was alarmed and suspended the matter. Concern about experiments also came from the Supreme Pontiff himself. Addressing the Consilium on 19 April 1967, Paul VI said he had been hurt by certain arbitrary liturgical experiments and pained by a tendency to desacralize the liturgy, though he reaffirmed his confidence in the Consilium; Antonelli, who recorded this, thought the pope didn't see that the difficulties arose from how the Consilium itself was interpreting the reform. In July 1967 Antonelli advised the pope that experiments should be few, limited in time and confined to a small number of qualified persons, because priests everywhere had begun to regard themselves as entitled to attempt almost anything "ad experimentum".

== The Missa normativa ==
=== Preparation and demonstration ===
The Missa normativa ("normative Mass") was the Consilium's proposed model of a revised Mass, prepared by the study group on the Mass, and it was shown to the first ordinary assembly of the Synod of Bishops in October 1967. The synod had 197 members and had been told that Lercaro would present the liturgical report as relator, with Bugnini as special secretary. Lercaro presented his report on 21 October and, on 24 October, Bugnini celebrated the Missa normativa in the Sistine Chapel before the synod fathers. It differed from the Mass then in use in having a longer Mass of the Catechumens with three readings, a recast offertory and a new Eucharistic prayer (later eucharistic prayer III in the Novus Ordo), and most of it was in Italian. Martimort, who regarded the staging as unfortunate, noted that it took place in the Sistine Chapel, in Italian, in front of no congregation.

=== The votes ===
The synod fathers were asked to vote on a number of questions about the Mass and the Office, and these must be kept apart. On the question whether the structure of the Missa normativa was acceptable on the whole, Bugnini records 71 placet (it pleases), 43 non placet (it is not pleasing) and 62 placet iuxta modum (with reservations), the vote being taken on 26 October and announced on 28 October; he adds in a footnote that there were as many as ten abstentions. Other sources give the same three figures but a different number of abstentions: the Church Life Journal account gives four, and the Short Critical Study of 1969 gives 43 non placet, 62 iuxta modum and four abstentions "out of 187 voters" without mentioning the placet votes. The totals do not reconcile (Bugnini's own text also mentions 197 voters), and the electorate for this question is not stated in the sources consulted. The synod's rules required a two-thirds majority, and the iuxta modum (with reservation) votes counted as qualified approval; taking them as such, approving votes outnumbered non placet by about three to one.

The other questions went differently. Using the power the pope gave it on four questions, the synod approved the three additional Eucharistic prayers, the words "which will be given up for you" in the consecration formula and the replacement of the Nicene Creed by the Apostles Creed at some Masses; it also approved removing the words "mystery of faith" from the consecration formula, though with 48 non placet. It did not reach two thirds on a proposal to replace the epistle and gospel on Sundays with three readings for an experimental period (72 placet, 41 iuxta modum, 59 non placet), which was eleven votes short on the count of Peter Hebblethwaite, an observer at the time. Bugnini later wrote that the experiment had not been a success and had produced the opposite of its intended effect. Archbishop George Dwyer, who favored liturgical change, wrote soon afterward that many bishops were dissatisfied with it, and Cardinal John Heenan criticized it openly. The authors of the Short Critical Study, created at the behest of archbishop Marcel Lefebvre later argued that the Missa normativa had been "in substance rejected" by the synod, that the 1969 Order of Mass reintroduced it, and that no vote of episcopal conferences had followed; the vote was on a demonstration of the experimental structure, not on the rite promulgated eighteen months later, which was substantially revised in the meantime.

=== Revision after the synod ===
The Consilium didn't drop the project. In January 1968, in the Capella Matilde of the Vatican Palace, three celebrations of the revised rite were held for a small group in the presence of Paul VI, who gave written observations on 22 January and asked that the text be circulated to the heads of the curial congregations. At its April 1968 plenary session several members raised difficulties with the changes requested. Members voted again on contested points at the general meeting of October 1968, and the divisions were close: Bugnini's record shows, for example, 17 votes to 13, with one iuxta modum, on the sign of the cross at the beginning of Mass. Martimort adds that the Consilium revisited several orientations already voted after the 1967 synod, and that the pope reviewed the Ordo Missae minutely. The final Order of Mass kept the three Sunday readings that the synod had not approved, and offered four Eucharistic prayers, the Roman Canon being the first.

== The reformed Order of Mass ==
The changes made to the Mass came in stages, and it helps to separate what was done by 1965 from what the 1969 books added. Under Inter Oecumenici, which took effect in March 1965, the priest no longer said privately the parts sung or recited by the choir or people; Psalm 42 and the prayers at the foot of the altar were omitted; the secret and the final doxology of the Canon were to be said or sung aloud; and the Pater Noster could be said by priest and people in the vernacular. For many parishioners that was the first visible change, followed by the vernacular for most of the Mass as episcopal conferences obtained confirmation of their texts under the procedure the Consilium devised in April 1964. Antonelli, who defended the omission of Psalm 42 on historical grounds, also argued that the Mass should have a penitential act at the beginning and that the oratio fidelium, as on Good Friday, should be restored; both were taken up in the 1969 rite.

The Order of Mass promulgated with the apostolic constitution Missale Romanum of 3 April 1969 applied the principles of ¶ 50 of the constitution (Note: "The rite of the Mass is to be revised in such a way that the intrinsic nature and purpose of its several parts, as also the connection between them, may be more clearly manifested, and that devout and active participation by the faithful may be more easily achieved.") to the whole Rite: the structure of the Liturgy of the Word and Liturgy of the Eucharist was made clearer, a three-year Sunday lectionary was introduced (Ordo lectionum Missae, 25 May 1969), and three new Eucharistic prayers (II-IV) were added to the Roman Canon, which became the first eucharistic prayer. The new rite was to come into force on the first Sunday of Advent, 30 November 1969; The Italian bishops conference announced a vernacular edition for that date. A complete Missale Romanum followed on 26 March 1970.

=== The General Instruction and the 1969 criticism ===
The Institutio Generalis was published with the Ordo Missae without being submitted to the Congregation for the Doctrine of the Faith. Bugnini acknowledged this, and Martimort called it an error that gave Cardinal Alfredo Ottaviani a pretext to criticize the text in public. According to Bugnini, Ottaviani and Cardinal Antonio Bacci sent Paul VI a letter and a Short Critical Study of the New Order of Mass on 25 September 1969, after the promulgation; the pope ordered an examination. Antonelli's notes, written for the Secretariat of State at the time, give 22 October as the date and report that three theologians consulted by the doctrinal congregation found no errors in the Ordo Missae; Cardinal Franjo Šeper was reported to have said that article 7 of the Institutio, which spoke of the Mass in terms of the Lord's supper, would be inexact if read as a definition. Antonelli's own view was that the Ordo Missae was doctrinally unassailable but that the Institutio emphasized the idea of a meal at the expense of sacrifice. The Consilium discussed a revision of article 7 on 12 November 1969 and the text was changed; Antonelli complained that the vote was taken without a written ballot or a show of hands. Writers associated with the Society of St. Pius X describe the Short Critical Study as compiled under Archbishop Marcel Lefebvre's direction; Martimort says only that its authors were well known although the text appeared anonymously.

== Paul VI and the Consilium ==
Paul VI followed the Consilium's work closely, scholars agree on that more than on its consequences. Bugnini, who met him often in the evenings, wrote that the pope read dossiers line by line and annotated them in several colors; Martimort, who had his own archive of the period, confirmed that the pope followed the work and added that Bugnini's book also shows his anxiety about decisions. The documented interventions are specific. Antonelli's diary for February 1964 records that concelebration at the Holy Thursday Chrism Mass was something the pope wanted, and the idea of making that Mass an occasion for renewal of priestly commitment came from Paul VI, who had stressed it as archbishop of Milan. He suspended the October 1965 experiment, sent his observations on the Missa normativa in January 1968, reviewed the Order of Mass in detail, and declined to give the Consilium statutes.

Martimort said he did not entirely share Bugnini's optimism about the pope's wishes, which in his experience had often been a difficulty in preparing the Order of Mass. In his address of 10 April 1970, Paul VI thanked the members, described the constitution as the "great charter" of liturgical renewal, said the Consilium was now being dismissed with the new Congregation in place, and asked that the renewal continue devoutly and faithfully and not at anyone's discretion.

== Conclusion and transfer of functions ==
The apostolic constitution Sacra Rituum Congregatio of 8 May 1969 abolished the Congregation of Rites and created two bodies, the Congregation for the Causes of Saints and the Congregation for Divine Worship. The Consilium was kept as a special commission inside the Congregation for Divine Worship for the duration of its task; its cardinal members became members of the Congregation, bishop members were reduced to seven chosen from among them, and Bugnini became secretary. The Consilium's last general meeting took place on 9-10 April 1970, and Antonelli, who was present, recorded that Cardinal Gut called it the last meeting and the new Congregation its continuation; on the afternoon of 9 April the offices of the Congregation were inaugurated. Paul VI's address on 10 April dismissed the Consilium. Reiner Kaczynski likewise dates the end of its activity to April 1970. Massimiliano Proietti argues that the Consilium was conceived as a non-curial body working with the bishops' conferences, and that as the late 1960s brought a return to curial procedure, that model was given up for a regular dicastery.

The Congregation wasn't a simple continuation. Martimort wrote that, despite appearances, it differed from the Consilium in important ways, one being the plenary meetings ceased after April 1970, the consultors no longer took part in them, the few bishops associated with the cardinals changed the atmosphere of votes, and its business went through the Secretariat of State and consultation with several dicasteries instead of reaching the pope directly. Work already begun continued, and some books were completed, among them the rites of baptism of adults, and of the sick in 1972, and of penance in 1973, but others remained unfinished at the end.

Bugnini's later career is a separate matter from the Consilium's history. He was secretary of the Congregation for Divine Worship from 1969; on 9 July 1975 Cardinal James Knox told him that his mission was over, and a constitution of 11 July merged the Congregation with that for the discipline of the sacraments. In January 1976 by Pope Paul VI named Bugnini the apostolic pro-nuncio to Iran

== Authorized experiments and local practice ==
The Consilium's authorized experiments should, and need to be separated from what happened in parishes without authority and from reforms adopted after it ended. Sacrosanctum Concilium ¶ 22 forbade anyone, including a priest, to change the liturgy on his own authority, and Bugnini himself describes unauthorized experiments as a separate and troublesome problem. Antonelli wrote in July 1968 that Masses in private homes and group Masses connected with common meals had become more frequent and that he blamed part of the disorder on the system of experiments, though he also concluded at the end of 1969 that his impression of the reform was "substantially good". The Congregation for Divine Worship issued the instruction Liturgicae instaurationes on 5 September 1970 to reprove abuses that were spreading; Martimort noted that it was not submitted to the Congregation's consultors or plenary meeting. Critics of the Post-Conciliar reform, such as Archbishop Malcolm Ranjith, in his foreword to Giampietro's book, lists Mass facing the people, Communion in the hand, the loss of Latin and Gregorian chant and the extension of concelebration among practices the constitution had not contemplated that were allowed in.

== Reception and later debate ==
Criticism of the reform has taken several forms. The Short Critical Study of 1969 held that the new Order of Mass departed from the theology of the Mass defined at the Council of Trent. Lefebvre and the society he founded, the Society of St. Pius X have argued that the changes were doctrinal and followed from the reform itself; the Holy See has not rejected this and has affirmed the validity and viability of the Mass of Paul VI. A distinct line of criticism came from within the mainstream. Joseph Ratzinger, then Prefect of the Congregation for the Doctrine of the Faith, later Pope Benedict XVI, wrote in his memoir Milestones (1998) that the revision the council called for was replaced by a new structure and that setting a new missal beside the historically grown rite and forbidding the latter made the liturgy seem a product of scholarship and legal authority, which he thought had harmed the Church; he also said he did not regret the reform, and welcomed the wider readings and the vernacular. In a preface to the French edition of Klaus Gamber's The Reform of the Roman Liturgy he described the postconciliar reform as replacing an organically grown liturgy with a fabricated one.

Another strand places the difficulty in the council itself. The Swiss theologian Romano Amerio argued in Iota Unum (1985) that the postconciliar period involved genuine ruptures, of which the liturgical changes were one instance. The historian Roberto de Mattei has argued that Vatican II is unusual in having produced two opposed readings and has traced this to ambiguity in the documents. Benedict XVI addressed this in a December 2005 address to the Roman Curia, contrasting a "hermeneutic of discontinuity and rupture" with a "hermeneutic of reform" in which the council is understood in continuity with the Church before it.

Defenders of the reform point to the process and to the Council's own text. Martimort, who sat in the preparatory commission, the conciliar commission and the Consilium, wrote that the reform, accomplished amid obstacles, deserved the "astonished gaze" Bugnini gave it from his own trial, while insisting that its spirit be safeguarded. Paul VI's 1970 address called the constitution the charter of the renewal and said the Consilium had worked in large part for the Council's renewal of the Church's life. Even participants did not agree about every result. Bouyer, who served as a consultor, criticized aspects of how the reform was carried out, and Antonelli, who thought the new Ordo Missae good, considered the Institutio less so and wrote of confusion in its execution.

== See also ==
- Hermeneutics of the Second Vatican Council
- Sacrosanctum Concilium
- Mass of Paul VI
- Ottaviani Intervention
- Tridentine Mass
- Second Vatican Council
- Society of St. Pius X

== Bibliography ==
- Bouyer, Louis (2015). Memoirs. Translated by Nash, Anne Englund. San Francisco: Ignatius Press. ISBN 978-1-58617-695-2.
- Bugnini, Annibale (1990). The Reform of the Liturgy, 1948-1975. Translated by O'Connell, Matthew J. Collegeville, Minnesota: The Liturgical Press. ISBN 0-8146-1571-6.
- Chiron, Yves (2018). Annibale Bugnini: Reformer of the Liturgy. Translated by Pepino, John. Angelico Press.
- Davies, Michael (2003). Liturgical Time Bombs in Vatican II: The Destruction of Catholic Faith Through Changes in Catholic Worship. TAN Books. ISBN 978-0-89555-773-5.
- Davies, Michael (2009) [1980]. Pope Paul's New Mass. Liturgical Revolution. Vol. 3. Kansas City, Missouri: Angelus Press. ISBN 978-1-892331-73-1.
- Giampietro, Nicola (2009). The Development of the Liturgical Reform as Seen by Cardinal Ferdinando Antonelli from 1948 to 1970. Fort Collins, Colorado: Roman Catholic Books. ISBN 978-1-934888-12-4.
- Marini, Piero (2007). A Challenging Reform: Realizing the Vision of the Liturgical Renewal. Liturgical Press.
- Martimort, Aimé-Georges (1985). "L'histoire de la réforme liturgique à travers le témoignage de Mgr Annibale Bugnini" (PDF). La Maison-Dieu (in French). 162: 125–155.
- Reid, Alcuin (2005). The Organic Development of the Liturgy: The Principles of Liturgical Reform and Their Relation to the Twentieth-Century Liturgical Movement Prior to the Second Vatican Council (2nd ed.). San Francisco: Ignatius Press. ISBN 978-1-58617-106-3.
