= Filippo Maria Guidi =

Italian Catholic cardinal (born 1815)

His Beatitude and Eminence Filippo Maria Guidi OP
- Cardinal; Archbishop Emeritus of Bologna
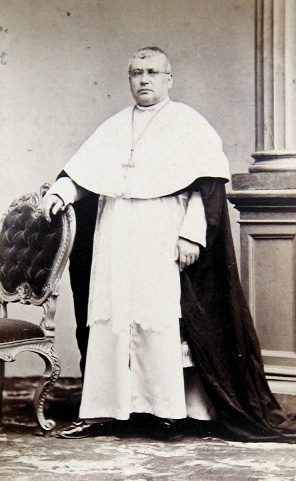
- Filippo Maria Guidi
- Church: Latin Church
- Installed: December 21, 1863
- Term ended: November 12, 1871
- Predecessor: Michele Viale-Prelà
- Successor: Carlo Luigi Morichini

Orders
- Created cardinal: by Pope Pius IX
- Rank: Cardinal priest

Personal details
- Born: 18 July 1815 Italy
- Died: 27 February 1879 (aged 63)
- Motto: Sufficit tibi gratia mea ('My grace is sufficient for you')

Filippo Maria Guidi OFM (18 July 1815 – 27 February 1879) was an Italian Catholic prelate who was elevated to the rank of cardinal by Pope Pius IX.

== Life ==
He was born in San Biagio d'Argenta, Ferrara, he was baptized with the names Gaetano Giuseppe. He moved with his family to Bologna when he was still a boy.

He died on 27 February 1879 at the age of 63 in Rome. He was laid to rest in the Church of Santa Maria sopra Minerva. He was buried in the chapel of the Dominican Friars in the Verano Cemetery in Rome.

== Education ==
Having entered the seminary of Acquapendente, he continued his studies in the Order of Preachers (Dominicans), at the convent of Santa Maria della Quercia, Viterbo.

He took religious vows in 1834 at the convent of Perugia, while at the convent of Santa Maria sopra Minerva in Rome he obtained the "magister" in theology.

== Career in the Catholic Church ==
He served as the Archbishop of Bologna, Italy from 1863 to 1871.

He served as the Cardinal-Bishop of Frascati from 1872 to 1879.

=== Cardinal ===
Pope Pius IX created him cardinal-priest in the consistory of 16 March 1863, he received the red hat and the title of San Sisto on the following 19 March.

He attended the Papal Conclave of 1878.

== See also ==
- 1878 papal conclave
- First Vatican Council
