= Francesco Battaglini =

Catholic cardinal

His Eminence Francesco Battaglini
- Archbishop of Bologna
- Church: Roman Catholic Church
- Archdiocese: Bologna
- See: Bologna
- Appointed: 3 July 1882
- Installed: 14 September 1882
- Term ended: 8 July 1892
- Predecessor: Lucido Maria Parocchi
- Successor: Serafino Vannutelli
- Other post: Cardinal-Priest of San Bernardo alle Terme (1885–92)
- Previous post: Bishop of Rimini (1879–82)

Orders
- Ordination: 20 September 1845 by Carlo Oppizzoni
- Consecration: 9 March 1879 by Raffaele Monaco La Valletta
- Created cardinal: 27 July 1885 by Pope Leo XIII
- Rank: Cardinal-Priest

Personal details
- Born: Francesco Battaglini; 13 March 1823 Mirabello, Papal States
- Died: 8 July 1892 (aged 69) Villa Guastavillani, Bologna, Kingdom of Italy
- Coat of arms

Styles of Francesco Battaglini
- Reference style: His Eminence
- Spoken style: Your Eminence
- Religious style: Monsignor
- Informal style: Cardinal
- See: Bologna

Francesco Battaglini (13 March 1823 – 8 July 1892) was a Roman Catholic Cardinal and Archbishop of Bologna.

He was born in the Archdiocese of Bologna and received the sacrament of confirmation on 7 October 1827. He was educated at the University of Bologna where he earned his doctorate in theology in 1848. He was ordained to the priesthood on 20 September 1845.

After his doctorate he was a professor of philosophy and theology at the Seminary of Bologna, until 1878.

== Episcopate ==
Pope Leo XIII appointed him Bishop of Rimini in February 1879. He remained in the see of Rimini until he was appointed to the metropolitan see of Bologna on 3 July 1882. Like most Archbishops of Bologna he was created Cardinal-Priest of San Bernardo alle Terme in the consistory of 27 July 1885.

== Death and burial ==
He died in 1892 and was buried, temporarily, in the chapel of the Carthusian monastery of Bologna. His body was transferred to the Bentivoglio Chapel, in October 1893. He was again transferred to a new tomb in the parish church of Mirabello, February 2000; the tomb was blessed by Cardinal Giacomo Biffi, Archbishop of Bologna, in 2000.

Catholic Church titles
Preceded by Lucido Maria Parocchi	Archbishop of Bologna; 3 July 1882 – 8 July 1892	Succeeded by Serafino Vannutelli
