= Giovanni Nasalli Rocca di Corneliano =

Italian Cardinal

His Eminence Giovanni Nasalli Rocca di Corneliano
- Archbishop of Bologna
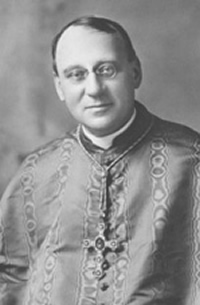
- Church: Roman Catholic Church
- Archdiocese: Bologna
- See: Bologna
- Appointed: 21 November 1921
- Term ended: 13 March 1952
- Predecessor: Giorgio Gusmini
- Successor: Giacomo Lercaro
- Other post: Cardinal-Priest of Santa Maria in Traspontina (1923-52)
- Previous posts: Bishop of Gubbio (1907-16); Titular Archbishop of Thebae (1916-21); Almoner of Papal Charities (1916-21)

Orders
- Ordination: 8 June 1895 by Giovanni Battista Scalabrini
- Consecration: 10 February 1907 by Vincenzo Vannutelli
- Created cardinal: 23 May 1923 by Pope Pius XI
- Rank: Cardinal-Priest

Personal details
- Born: Giovanni Nasalli Rocca di Corneliano; 27 August 1872 Piacenza, Kingdom of Italy
- Died: 13 March 1952 (aged 79) Bologna, Italy
- Education: Pontifical Gregorian University; Pontifical Ecclesiastical Academy
- Motto: Ut turres

Styles of Giovanni Nasalli Rocca di Corneliano
- Reference style: His Eminence
- Spoken style: Your Eminence
- Informal style: Cardinal
- See: Bologna

Giovanni Battista Nasalli Rocca di Corneliano (27 August 1872 – 13 March 1952) was an Italian Cardinal of the Catholic Church. He served as archbishop of Bologna from 1921 until his death, and was elevated to the cardinalate in 1923.

== Biography ==
Nasalli Rocca di Corneliano was born in Piacenza to a family of nobility; his nephew was Mario Nasalli Rocca di Corneliano, who became a cardinal as well in 1969. He received the Sacrament of Confirmation in 1880, and his first Communion in 1881, while he was a student at Collegio Vida in Cremona. After being given the clerical tonsure in 1888 by Bishop Giovanni Scalabrini, Nasalli Rocca di Corneliano entered the seminary in Piacenza, where he studied philosophy, theology, canon law, scuola tomista, and moral theology.

He continued his education at the Collegio dei Ss. Ambrogio e Carlo at Rome in October 1891, and the Collegio Lombardo, where he studied with Carlo Perosi and Luigi Sincero. Nasalli Rocca was ordained to the priesthood by Bishop Scalabrini on 8 June 1895, and then did pastoral work in Piacenza until 1896. He then went to Rome to attend the Pontifical Gregorian University, from where he obtained his doctorate in theology in 1895, and Pontifical Ecclesiastical Academy, earning a doctorate in canon law in 1898.

The young priest collaborated with Bishop Giacomo Radini-Tedeschi in organising Catholic Action in Rome and the rest of Italy, and, in 1899, he entered the service of the Roman Curia, upon his nomination as an apprendista in the Sacred Congregation of Extraordinary Ecclesiastical Affairs with its secretary, Felice Cavagnis. He became canon coadjutor of the Liberian Basilica in 1899, rising to become full canon in 1902. Nasalli Rocca was raised to the rank of Domestic Prelate of His Holiness on 5 May 1902, and protonotary apostolic on the following 31 May. From 1904 to 1906, he served as Apostolic Visitor for the Sacred Visit of Rome, the dioceses of Ancona, Penne ed Atri, Recanati e Loreto, Teramo e Fermo, Bojano e Campobasso, and for many Italian seminaries.

On 25 January 1907, Nasalli Rocca was appointed Bishop of Gubbio by Pope Pius X. He received his episcopal consecration on the following 10 February from Cardinal Vincenzo Vannutelli, with Archbishop Paolo Barone and Bishop Raffaele Virili serving as co-consecrators, in the Liberian Basilica. He was later named Titular Archbishop of Thebae and Privy Almoner of His Holiness on 6 December 1916, and an Assistant at the Pontifical Throne on 9 December of that same year. After becoming an ecclesiastical assistant to the Italian Catholic Youth in June 1921, Nasalli Rocca was appointed Archbishop of Bologna on 21 November 1921.

Pope Pius XI created him Cardinal-Priest of S. Maria in Traspontina in the consistory of 23 May 1923. He served as papal legate to several religious ceremonies and events between 1923 and 1946, and was one of the cardinal electors who participated in the 1939 papal conclave, which selected Pope Pius XII.

Cardinal Nasalli Rocca died in Bologna, at the age of 79. He is buried in the basilica of Madonna di S. Luca.

Catholic Church titles
Preceded by Angelo Dolci	Bishop of Gubbio; 1907–1916	Succeeded by Carlo Taccetti
Preceded by Augusto Silj	Privy Almoner of His Holiness; 1916–1921	Succeeded by Carlo Cremonesi
Preceded by Giorgio Gusmini	Archbishop of Bologna; 1921–1952	Succeeded by Giacomo Lercaro
