= Carlo Oppizzoni =

Italian Roman Catholic cardinal and archbishop

His Eminence Carlo Oppizzoni
- Archbishop of Bologna
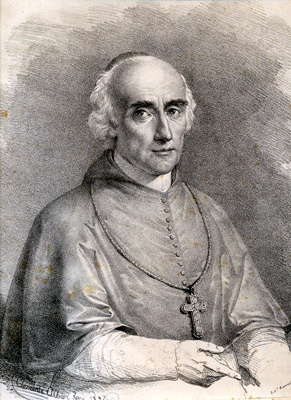
- Church: Roman Catholic Church
- Archdiocese: Bologna
- See: Bologna
- Appointed: 20 September 1802
- Term ended: 13 April 1855
- Predecessor: Andrea Gioannetti
- Successor: Michele Viale-Prelà
- Other posts: Protopriest (1839–1855); Cardinal-Priest of San Lorenzo in Lucina (1839–1855)
- Previous post: Cardinal-Priest of San Bernardo alle Terme (1804–1839)

Orders
- Ordination: 25 May 1793
- Consecration: 21 September 1802 by Giovanni Filippo Gallarati Scotti
- Created cardinal: 26 March 1804 by Pope Pius VII
- Rank: Cardinal-Priest

Personal details
- Born: Carlo Oppizzoni; 15 April 1769 Milan, Duchy of Milan
- Died: 13 April 1855 (aged 85) Bologna, Papal States
- Buried: Bologna Cathedral
- Parents: Francesco Oppizzoni; Paola Trivulzio
- Education: University of Pavia

Carlo Oppizzoni, spelled also Opizzoni or Oppizoni (15 April 1769 – 13 April 1855), was a Roman Catholic cardinal and archbishop.

== Biography ==
Oppizoni was born in Milan to an aristocratic family; he was the son of Count Francesco Oppizoni and Marchesa Paola Trivulzio. In 1790, he earned a doctorate in theology and canon law at the University of Pavia. In 1793, he was ordained as priest, and in 1799 became a leader of the Chapter of Canons of the Cathedral of Milan.

In 1802, he was named archbishop of Bologna. In 1804 Pope Pius VII raised him to the rank of cardinal. Napoleon named him senator in his arranged Kingdom of Italy, and member of the Order of the Iron Crown. However, he attempted to resist some of the political maneuvers of Napoleon and in 1808 tried to restore the rights to the church, and refused to attend the wedding of Napoleon with Marie Louise Habsburg in 1810; this caused the Napoleonic authorities to jail him in the Castle of Vincennes. He returned to Bologna in 1815.

He would fulfill a number of roles in the subsequent papal administrations, mostly while residing in Bologna, including as Archchancellor of the Pontifical University of Bologna. He was a papal legate to various provinces. He participated in four conclaves:

- Conclave of 1823, electing Pope Leo XII
- Conclave of 1829, electing Pope Pius VIII
- Conclave of 1830-1831, electing Pope Gregory XVI
- Conclave of 1846, electing Pope Pius IX
