= Michele Viale-Prelà =

French Catholic priest and diplomat

His Eminence Michele Viale-Prelà
- Cardinal, Archbishop of Bologna
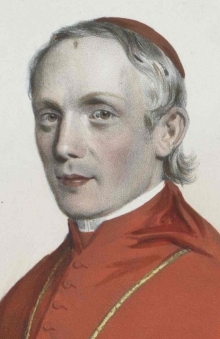
- Michele Viale-Prelà, Lithograph by Josef Kriehuber, 1853
- Archdiocese: Bologna
- Appointed: 28 September 1855
- Term ended: 15 May 1860 (died)
- Predecessor: Carlo Oppizzoni
- Successor: Filippo Maria Guidi
- Other post: Cardinal-Priest of Santi Andrea e Gregorio al Monte Celio

Orders
- Ordination: 29 September 1823
- Consecration: 18 July 1841 by Luigi Lambruschini
- Created cardinal: 15 March 1852 by Pope Pius IX

Personal details
- Born: 29 September 1798 Bastia, Corsica, France
- Died: 15 May 1860 (aged 61) Bologna, Italy
- Buried: Bologna Cathedral
- Denomination: Catholic

Michele Viale-Prelà (29 September 1798 – 15 May 1860) was an aristocratic Catholic priest from Corsica, France, who served as a diplomat for the Holy See in Switzerland, Bavaria and Austria. He became a Cardinal and the Archbishop of Bologna. When Bologna, formerly one of the Papal States, was incorporated into the Kingdom of Sardinia, he refused to recognize the new rulers.

== Life ==
=== Early years (1798–1822) ===
Michele Viale-Prelà was born in Bastia, Corsica, on 29 September 1798 to a notable family of Genoese origin. His uncle Tommaso was the physician of Pope Pius VII and his brother Benedetto was the physician of Pope Pius IX. His brother Salvatore became distinguished as a writer. Michele Viale-Prelà was given the clerical habit and tonsure in 1808 at the age of nine. He entered the Seminario Romano in Rome in 1814, then went to the Collegio Romano in Rome where he earned a doctorate in theology on 10 September 1823. He studied law and philosophy at the Sapienza University of Rome and earned a doctorate in philosophy.

=== Diplomat (1822–55) ===
Michele Viale-Prelà was made a subdeacon on 21 September 1822. He was ordained as a priest on 29 September 1823. He worked at the secretariat of State of the Holy See as an assistant to Cardinal Luigi Lambruschini from 1824 to 1830. From 1828 to 1836 Viale-Prelà was auditor in the Apostolic Nunciature in Switzerland. He again worked at the secretariat of State from 1836 to 1838. From 9 August 1838 to 1841 he was Apostolic Nuncio to Bavaria per pro in Munich. On 12 July 1841 Viale-Prelà was appointed titular Archbishop of Cartagine. He was consecrated on 18 July 1841 in the church of San Carlo ai Catinari, Rome, by Cardinal Luigi Lambruschini and was made assistant at the Pontifical Throne on 20 July 1841. He continued as Apostolic Internuncio to Bavaria from 1841 to 1845.

Viale-Prelà was appointed Nuncio in Austria on 27 May 1845. He became close to Prince Klemens von Metternich and supported his policies even when they differed from the interests of the Papal States. After the Revolutions of 1848 he skillfully led the negotiations between the Austro-Hungarian Empire and the Holy See that were concluded in the mutually satisfactory agreement of 18 August 1855. This would last until the fall of the Habsburg monarchy in 1918. In the Papal consistory of 15 March 1852 he was made Cardinal reserved in pectore. His appointment was published on 7 March 1853. From 1853 to 1856 he continued as Pronuncio in Austria.

=== Archbishop of Bologna (1855–60) ===
On 28 September 1855 Viale-Prelà was transferred to the Metropolitan See of Bolgona. He succeeded Carlo Oppizzoni and would in turn be succeeded by Filippo Maria Guidi. On 18 September 1856 he was appointed Cardinal-Priest of the church of Santi Andrea e Gregorio al Monte Celio in Rome. He remained in Vienna until 1856 to see through the implementation of the agreement, and began to govern to diocese of Bologna, a papal dominion, around the end of 1856. He gained a reputation as an opponent of liberalism, a strong supporter of the Pope's rule in the Papal States, a supporter of the Inquisition and a campaigner for morality and religious purification. His rigid and uncompromising stance drew a hostile reaction even from the clergy.

During the Second Italian War of Independence the Austrian garrison in Bologna left early in the morning of 12 June 1859. By the end of the day the papal colors flying in the squares had been replaced with the Italian green, white and red, the Cardinal Legate had left the city, and a group styling itself Bologna's provisional government had proclaimed its desire to join the Kingdom of Sardinia. Bologna was promptly incorporated as part of the province of Romagna. Michele Viale-Prelà tried to persuade the citizenry not to co-operate with the new civil authorities, but had little success. One of the new order's first official acts was to introduce freedom of religion and make all citizens equal before the law. Viale-Prelà refused to have any dealings with the new rulers.

Michele Viale-Prelà died on 15 May 1860 at the age of 60. He was interred in Bologna Cathedral. He was an authoritarian prince of the church, opposed to democratic tendencies in the Cologne clergy, against the revolutions of 1848, for the independence of the church but in favor of state protection of the church. He was also a keen collector of contemporary German religious paintings.

== Sources ==
- David M. Cheney (2015), "Archdiocese of Bologna", Catholic Hierarchy
- David M. Cheney, "Michele Cardinal Viale-Prelà", Catholic Hierarchy
- Ersilio Michel (1937), "VIALE PRELÀ, Michele", Enciclopedia Italiana (in Italian)
- Frosali Viviana (2011), "Viale-Prelà Michele", Sistema Informativo Unificato per le Soprintendenze Archivistiche (in Italian)
- Joanna Lubos-Kozieł (12 April 2010), "The Bishop Heinrich Förster's collection of paintings", Silesian Art Collections
- Kertzer, David I (1998) [1997], The Kidnapping of Edgardo Mortara, New York: Vintage Books, ISBN 978-0-679-76817-3
- Michael F. Feldkamp, "Apostolische Nuntiatur, München: Verzeichnis der päpstlichen Nuntien in München", Historisches Lexikon Bayerns (in German)
- Reimund Haas (2013), "Johannes von Geissel (1796-1864), Erzbischof von Köln (1842/1845-1864)", Rheinische Geschichte (in German), Köln
- Salvador Miranda, "VIALE-PRELÀ, Michele", The Cardinals of the Holy Roman Church - Consistory of March 15, 1852, Florida International University Libraries, archived from the original on 2017-10-24
