= Benno Gut =

Swiss cardinal, monk, and Roman curial official (1897–1970)

His Eminence Benno Gut OSB
- Prefect of the Congregation for Divine Worship
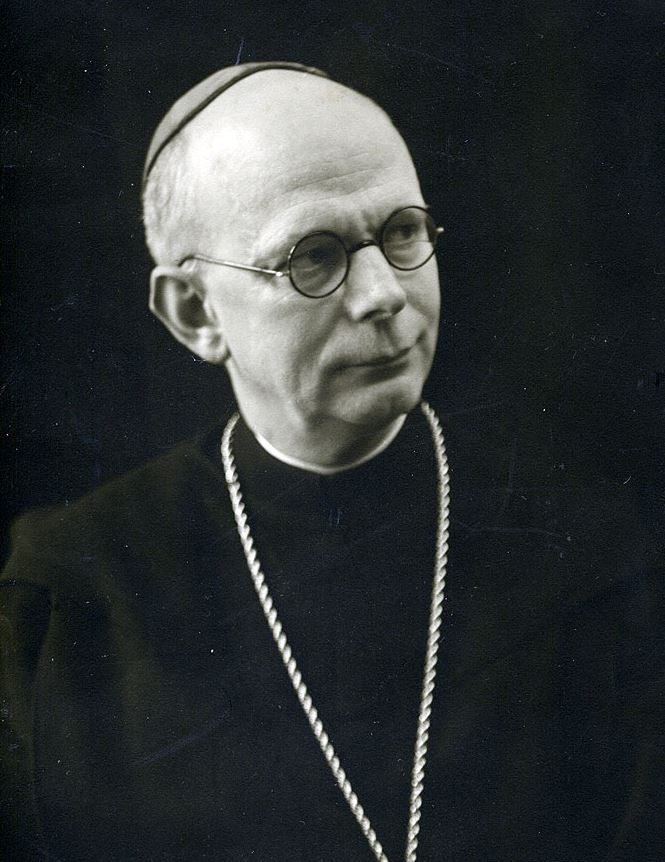
- Gut in 1959
- Church: Latin Church
- Appointed: 8 May 1969
- Term ended: 8 December 1970
- Other post: Cardinal-Deacon of San Giorgio in Velabro (1967–70)
- Previous posts: Abbot Ordinary of Maria Einsiedeln (1947–59); President of the Benedictine Congregation of Switzerland (1947–59); Abbot Primate of the Benedictine Confederation of the Order of Saint Benedict (1959–67); Titular Archbishop of Thuccabora (1967); Prefect of the Congregation for Rites (1968–69); President of the Consilium for Implementing the Constitution on the Sacred Liturgy (1968–69)

Orders
- Ordination: 10 July 1921
- Consecration: 18 June 1967 by Eugène-Gabriel-Gervais-Laurent Tisserant
- Created cardinal: 26 June 1967 by Pope Paul VI
- Rank: Cardinal-deacon

Personal details
- Born: Walter Gut; 1 April 1897 Reiden, Basel, Switzerland
- Died: 8 December 1970 (aged 73) Rome, Italy
- Buried: Archabbey of Maria Einsiedeln
- Education: University of Basel; Pontificio Sant'Anselmo; Pontifical Biblical Institute
- Motto: Gaudete in Domino semper
- Coat of arms

Benno Gut OSB (1 April 1897 – 8 December 1970) was a Benedictine monk of the Archabbey of Maria Einsiedeln, Switzerland, and a Latin Church cardinal of the Catholic Church. He served as prefect of the Congregation for Divine Worship in the Roman Curia from 1969 until his death, and was elevated to the cardinalate in 1967.

== Biography ==
Walter Gut was born in Reiden, Switzerland, entered the Order of Saint Benedict at the Archabbey of Maria Einsiedeln, made his monastic profession as a monk on 6 January 1918, and was given the name of "Benno". He began his studies at the College of Maria Einsideln, at the musical conservatory of Basel, University of Basel, at the Benedictine Pontificio Sant'Anselmo in Rome, and at the Pontifical Biblical Institute in Rome. Ordained to the priesthood on 10 July 1921, Gut finished his studies in 1923 and then did pastoral work at Einsiedeln Abbey until 1930.

Gut taught at his alma mater of "Pontificio Sant'Anselmo" from 1930 to 1939, at which time he returned to Switzerland and became a professor at the Einsiedeln Abbey College. On 15 April 1947 he was elected abbot of the Archabbey of Maria Einsiedeln, receiving the traditional episcopal benediction of new abbots from Archbishop Filippo Bernardini on the following 5 May. On 24 September 1959, Gut was elected as the fourth Abbot Primate of the Benedictine Confederation. From 1962 to 1965 he attended the Second Vatican Council.

On 10 June 1967 Gut was appointed Titular Archbishop of Thuccabora by Pope Paul VI. He received his episcopal consecration eight days later, on 18 June, from Cardinal Eugène Cardinal Tisserant, with Bishops Joseph Hasler and Johannes Vonderach serving as co-consecrators, at the Archabbey of Maria Einsiedeln.

Pope Paul VI created him Cardinal Deacon of San Giorgio al Velabro in the consistory of 26 June the same year in advance of naming him prefect of Congregation of Rites on the following 29 June. Along with prefect of rites, Gut also assumed in 1968 the position of president of the consilium for liturgical reform, of which the Benedictine abbot was an advocate. He later resigned as abbot primate of the Benedictine Confederation on 8 September 1967. With the dissolution of the Congregation of Rites, the cardinal became prefect of the newly established Congregation for Divine Worship on 7 May 1969.

Gut died in Rome at the age of 73. He is buried in Archabbey of Maria Einsiedeln.

Catholic Church titles
Preceded by Ignazio Staub	Abbot of Einsiedeln Abbey; 1947–1959	Succeeded by Rainmund Tschudy
Preceded by Bernard Kälin	Abbot Primate of the Benedictine Confederation; 1959–1967	Succeeded by Rembert Weakland
Preceded by Arcadio Larraona Saralegui	Prefect of the Congregation of Rites; 1967–1969	Succeeded by Paolo Bertoli as Prefect of the Congregation for the Causes of Saints
Preceded by Arcadio Larraona Saralegui	Prefect of the Congregation of Rites; 1967–1969	Succeeded by Himself as Prefect of the Congregation for Divine Worship
Preceded by Himself as Prefect of the Congregation of Rites	Prefect of the Congregation for Divine Worship; 1969–1970	Succeeded by Arturo Tabera Araoz
Preceded by Giacomo Lercaro	President of the Council for the Implementation of the Constitution on the Sacred Liturgy; 1968–1969	Succeeded by merged with Prefect of the Congregation for Divine Worship
