= Archdiocese of Bologna =

Catholic archdiocese in Italy

Coordinates: 44.4958°N 11.3433°E

Archdiocese of Bologna Archidioecesis Bononiensis Arcidiocesi di Bologna

Catholic
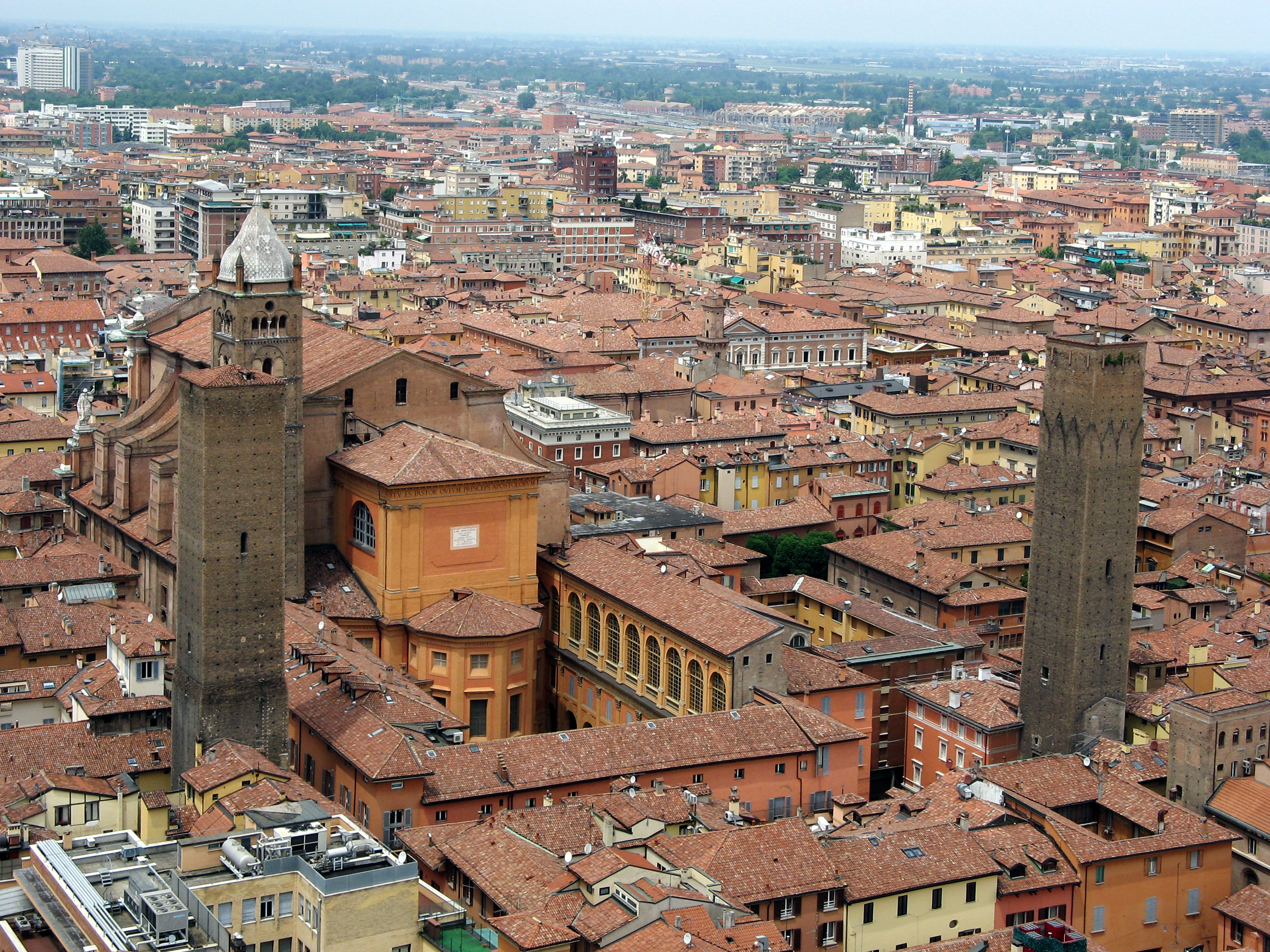
- Aerial view of Bologna Cathedral.

Location
- Country: Italy

Statistics
- Area: 3,549 km^{2} (1,370 sq mi)
- Population: Total; Catholics: (as of 2023); 1,006,805 ▲; 942,613 ▼ (93.6%)
- Parishes: 405 ▼ (14 deaneries)

Information
- Denomination: Catholic
- Sui iuris church: Latin Church
- Rite: Roman Rite
- Established: Diocese in 3rd century, Archdiocese in 1582
- Cathedral: Cattedrale Metropolitana di San Pietro
- Patron saint: Saint Petronius
- Secular priests: 300 (diocesan) ▼186 (religious Orders) ▼162 Permanent Deacons ▲

Current leadership
- Pope: Leo XIV
- Archbishop: Matteo Zuppi
- Vicar General: Giovanni Silvagni (vicar general); Gabriele Cavina (pro-vicar general)

Website
- chiesadibologna.it

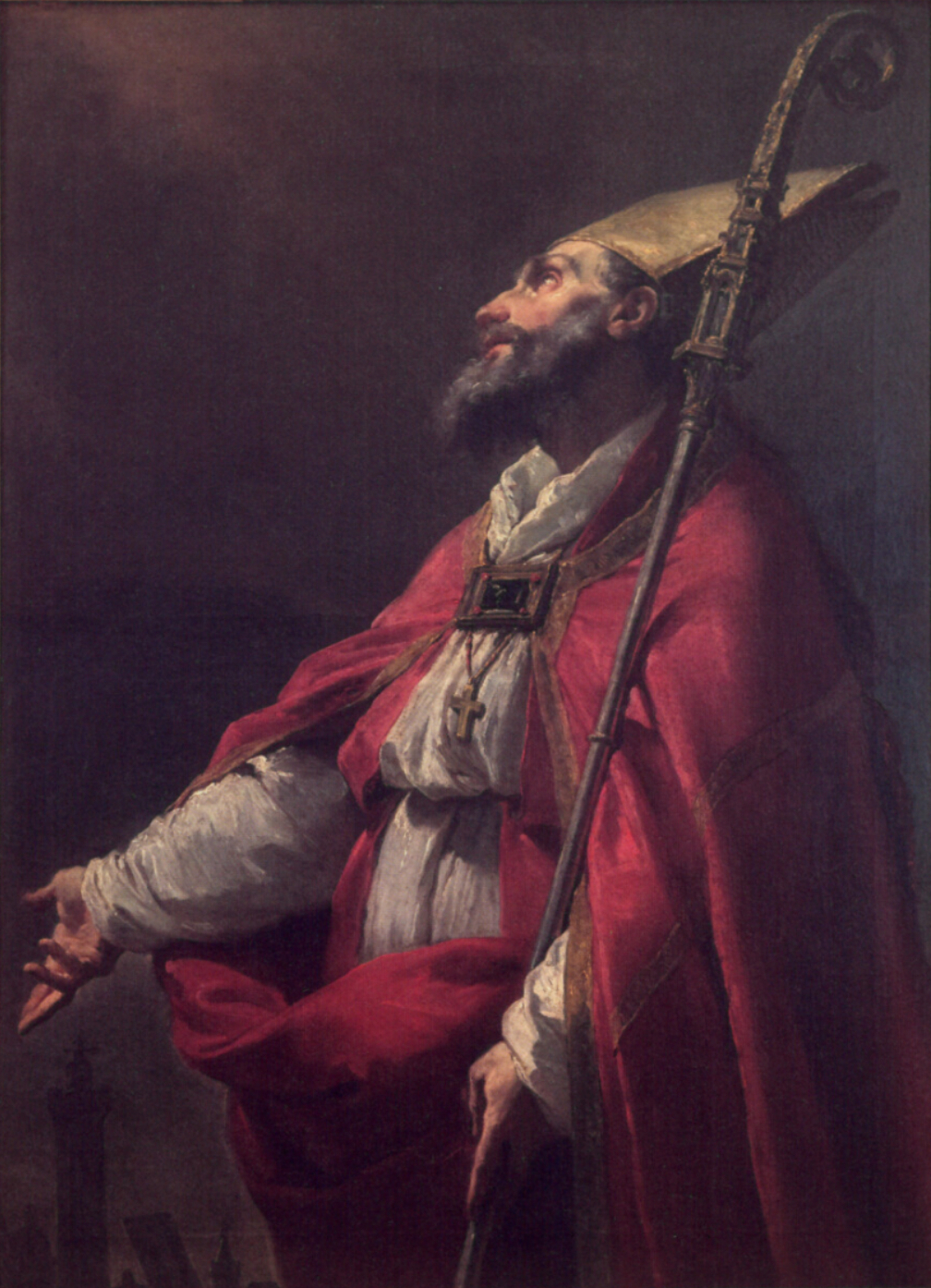
Saint Petronius, bishop in 431–450

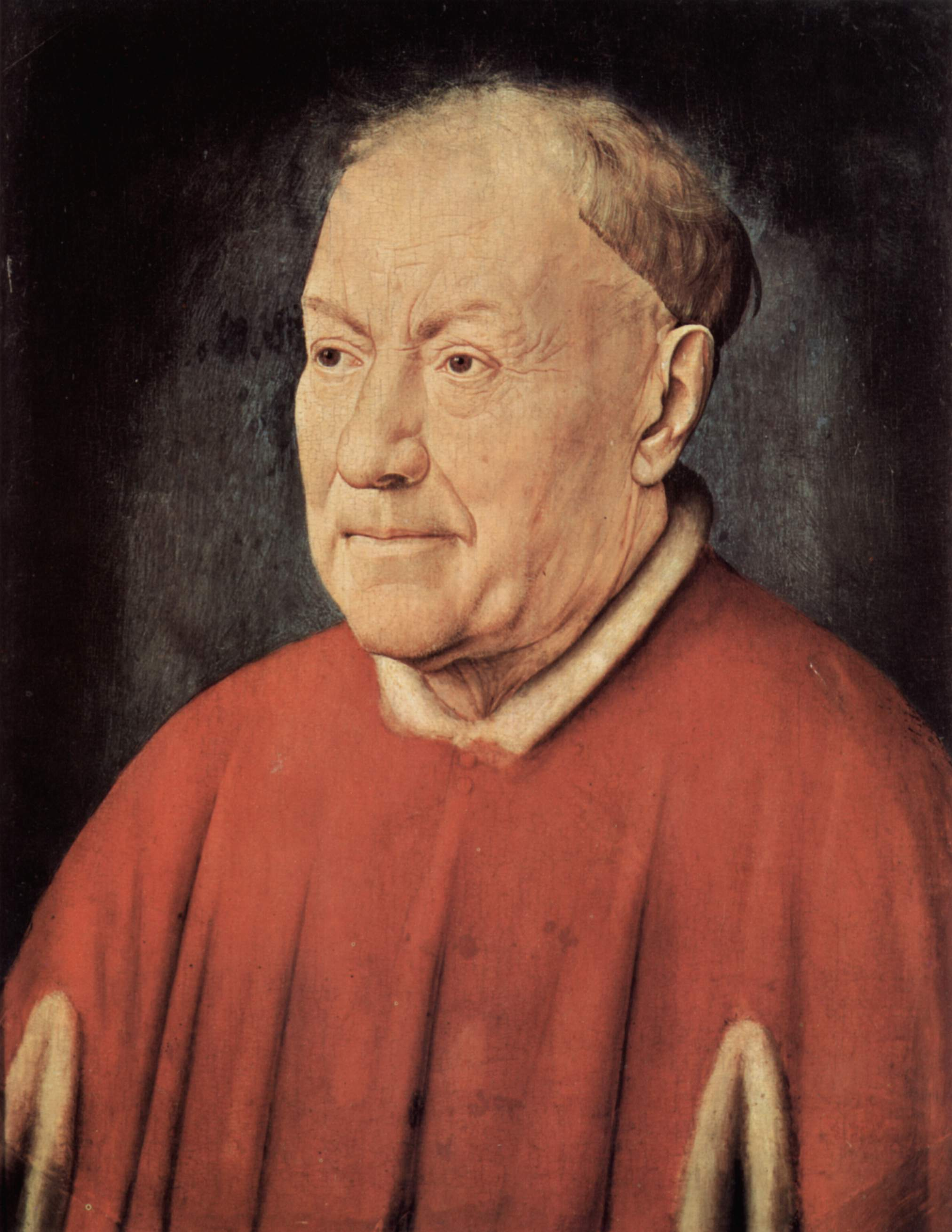
Blessed Niccolò Albergati, bishop in 1417–1443

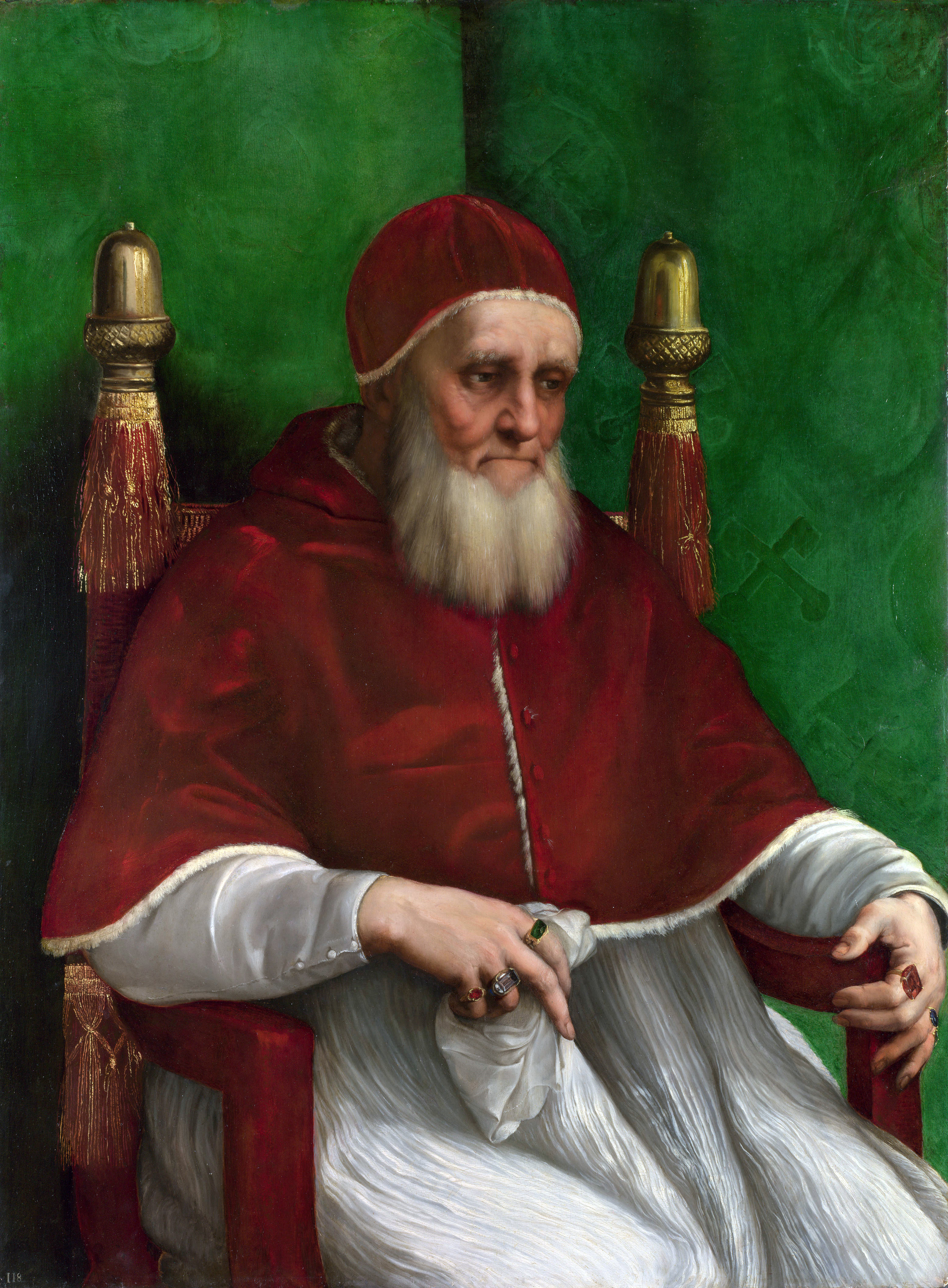
Cardinal Giuliano della Rovere, then Pope Julius II, bishop in 1483–1499

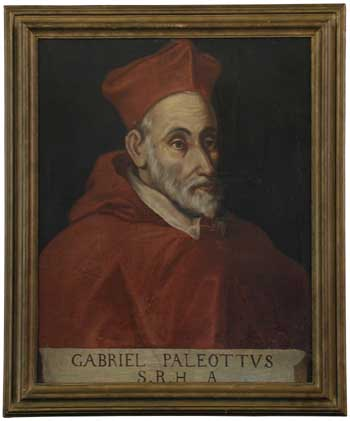
Cardinal Gabriele Paleotti, first archbishop, in 1582–1597

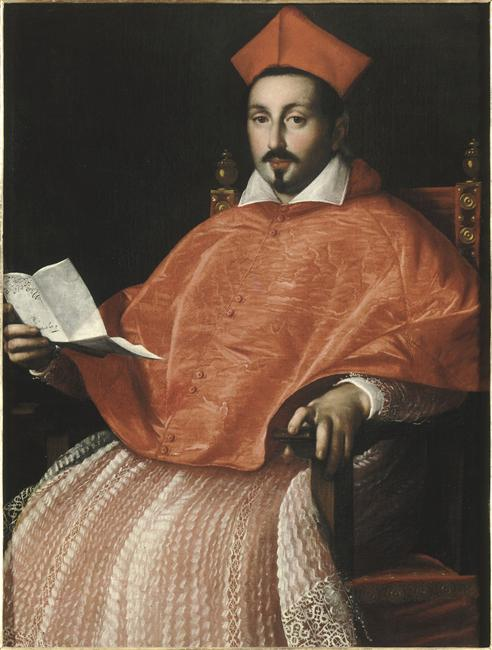
Cardinal Scipione Borghese, archbishop in 1610–1612

The Archdiocese of Bologna (Latin: Archidioecesis Bononiensis; Italian: Arcidiocesi di Bologna) is a Latin Church ecclesiastical territory or archdiocese of the Catholic Church in Northern Italy. The cathedra is in the cathedral church of San Pietro, Bologna. The current archbishop is Cardinal Matteo Zuppi, who was installed in 2015.

The Archdiocese of Bologna is a metropolitan archdiocese and has three suffragan dioceses within its ecclesiastical province: the Diocese of Imola, the Diocese of Faenza-Modigliana, and the Archdiocese of Ferrara-Comacchio.

== History ==
A detailed list of the various governments that have ruled Bologna is provided by Giovanni Battista Guidicini. In 1527, the Holy See became the absolute ruler of Bologna, and was represented by a Legatus a latere and a Vice-Legate. On 22 February 1530, Pope Clement VII crowned the Emperor Charles V as Holy Roman Emperor in Bologna, the last such event in history.

The bishopric of Bologna was founded in the 3rd century.

Originally it was a suffragan (under the supervision) of the diocese of Milan, but at the end of the 5th century became a suffragan of Ravenna. Because of the schism of the Antipope Clement III, Pope Paschal II, at the Council of Guastalla in October 1106, released Bologna from obedience to the church of Ravenna, and made it directly dependent on the papal See; but on 7 August 1118 Pope Gelasius II restored the previous status. Bishop Victor, therefore, enjoyed the privilege of being consecrated a bishop by Pope Paschal II in 1108. But when he came to die in 1129, the Bolognese resisted the demands of Archbishop Gualterius of Ravenna that he should consecrate the newly elected Bishop Henricus. The papal Legate, Gerardus of S. Croce in Gerusalemme, heard the dispute in his court on 13 April 1130, and Archbishop Gualterius established his right to consecrate the bishops of Bologna.

In 973, Bishop Albertus participated in a provincial synod of the ecclesiastical province of Ravenna, presided over by Archbishop Honestus, and held in the village of Marzalia in the diocese of Parma. Bishop Albertus complained to the assembly that his diocese was so poor that he was not able to sustain his clergy or his churches, on top of which Bishop Ubertus of Parma had taken control of certain territories near Parma which were the property of the diocese of Bologna. Ubertus replied that he had received them from his predecessors. The Archbishop and bishops agreed with the Bishop of Parma, chastised Albertus for raising the subject in the synod, and ordering both parties not to raise the matter again.

A major earthquake struck Bologna on Christmas Day, 1222, causing the vaults of the cathedral ceiling to collapse. Another severe earthquake occurred on 21 April 1223, centered at Cremona; and a third centered in Bologna in 1229.

In the winter of 1410, Pope Alexander V and the Papal Court arrived in Bologna, on their way from Pistoria (where plague had been detected) toward Rome, which had fallen to papal forces on 1 January 1410. Alexander died, however, while he was still in Bologna, on 4 May, waiting for the pacification of Rome and its neighborhood. A Conclave, therefore, took place in Bologna, beginning on 14 May and concluding on 17 May with the election of Cardinal Baldassare Cossa, the Legate of Bologna, who took the name John XXIII.

Pope Leo X visited Bologna from 8 December 1515 through 18 February 1516, where he held negotiations with King Francis I of France. Their talks resulted in the abrogation of the French Pragmatic Sanction and the conclusion of a new Concordat between the Papacy and France.

In 1568, as one of his efforts to implement the decrees of the Council of Trent, Bishop Gabriele Paleotti established the diocesan seminary of Bologna.

The Archdiocese of Bologna maintains a formal diocesan archive — the Archivio Generale Arcivescovile di Bologna — which was founded in 1573 and continues to preserve a significant documentary and historical-ecclesiastical heritage for the archdiocese.

== Archdiocese and metropolitan ==
In 1582 the diocese of Bologna was raised to the status of a metropolitan archbishopric by Pope Gregory XIII in the bull Universi orbis of 10 December 1582, which removed it from the ecclesiastical province of Ravenna. It was assigned as suffragans the diocese of Faenza and the diocese of Imola. In a decree of the Vatican Sacred Congregation of Bishops of 8 December 1976, a new arrangement of certain dioceses in ecclesiastical provinces was announced; the diocese of Ferrara was made a suffragan of the Archbishop of Bologna, though the Archbishop of Ferrara was allowed to keep the title of archbishop.

Nine of the early bishops have been recognized as saints in popular culture, and three other bishops and three archbishops have been elected to the Papacy as Pope Innocent VII (1404), Pope Nicholas V (1447), Pope Julius II (1503), Pope Gregory XV (1621), Pope Benedict XIV (1740) and Pope Benedict XV (1914).

=== Cathedral and Chapter ===
Bishop Adalfredus (after 1031 – 1055) suffered many sleepless nights, worried about the number and behavior of his Canons and their hangers-on. Finally, exasperated, he acted. On 16 August 1045, citing decrees of the holy Fathers that in each Church clerics should be ordained in accordance with the ability of that church to support those clerics ministering at the altar, he issued a decree in which he limited the number of Canons in the Cathedral of Bologna to fifty. Specifically mentioned are the Archpriest, the Cantor, and the Archdeacon. To support them, he granted them three parts of the ten percent tithe which was the episcopal income.

The Canons of the Cathedral Chapter were, according to information laid before the pope, interfering with the jurisdiction of the Archdeacon of Bologna. On 28 March 1219, Pope Honorius III wrote to the clergy and people to support the Archdeacon against the rebellion of the Canons. So that the Church of Bologna might not be despoiled of its rights if there were no person in the Chapter to have oversight of it, on 22 April 1219 Honorius granted the Archdeacons of Bologna full and free administration, spiritual and temporal, to correct and reform and decide matters. In separate letters, the Pope warned the Chapter and the Bishop not to interfere with the legitimate and canonical rights and jurisdiction of the Archdeacon.

In 1687, the Chapter of the Cathedral of S. Peter was composed of four dignities and sixteen Canons. In 1842 there were eighteen Canons. The dignities were: the Archdeacon, the Archpriest, the Provost, and the Primicerius.

=== Synods ===
A diocesan synod was an irregularly held, but important, meeting of the bishop of a diocese and his clergy. Its purpose was (1) to proclaim generally the various decrees already issued by the bishop; (2) to discuss and ratify measures on which the bishop chose to consult with his clergy; (3) to publish statutes and decrees of the diocesan synod, of the provincial synod, and of the Holy See.

In 1535, a diocesan synod was held by Bishop Agostino Zanetti, the suffragan bishop of Bologna under Cardinal Alessandro Campeggio (1526–1553), and another in 1547. Cardinal Gabriele Paleotti (1566–1597) held a diocesan synod on 16 October 1566, another in 1580, and another in 1594.

Cardinal Alessandro Ludovisi (1612–1621) held a diocesan synod on 11 June 1620. Cardinal Ludovico Ludovisi (1621–1632) held a Congregation of the diocese's archpriests on 9 March 1623, and then a diocesan synod on 8 June 1623. He held another on 30 May 1624. On 8 June 1634, Cardinal Girolamo Colonna (1632–1645) held a diocesan synod. Cardinal Girolamo Boncompagni (1651–1684) presided over a diocesan synod on 15 October 1654. Cardinal Giacomo Boncompagni (1690–1731) presided over a diocesan synod in Bologna on 17–19 June 1698. A diocesan synod was held in Bologna by Cardinal Andrea Giovanetti (1775–1800) on 2–4 September 1788.

Cardinal Giacomo Lercaro held a synod in 1962.

In 1586, Cardinal Paleotti held the first provincial synod of the ecclesiastical province of Bologna.

== List of bishops and archbishops ==
An old list of the bishops of Bologna, found along with the records of the synod of 1310, and perhaps compiled around that time, exists. The following is a list of the bishops and archbishops of Bologna from 313 to the present day.

=== Bishops ===
==== to 1000 ====
- Zama (313)
- Faustinianus (342)
- Domicianus (?)
- Theodorus (?)
- Jovianus
- Eusebius (370?)
- Eustasius (390?)
- Felix (c. 397 – died 431)
- Saint Petronius (431–450)
- Marcellus
- Parthenius
- Julianus (Giuliano)
- Hieroncius (Geronzio)
- Theodorus
- Luxorius (?)
- Tertulliano (?)
- Iocundus (Giocondo) (496?)
- Theodorus (II) (?)
- Clemens (?)
- Petrus (I) (?)
- Germanus (?)
- Costantinus (?)
- Iulianus (II) (?)
- Deusdedit (Adeodatus) (?)
- Iustinianus (?)
- Luminosus (649)
- Donno (?)
- Vittore I (680)
- Eliseo (?)
- Gaudenzio (?)
- Causino (?)
- Barbato (736 – after 744)
- Romano (752 – after 756)
- Pietro II (786)
- Vitale (801)
- Martino I (?)
- Teodoro III (after 814 – 825)
- Cristoforo (827)
- Martino II (?)
- Pietro III (?)
- Orso (?)
- Giovanni I (880–881)
- Severo (884 – after 898)
- Pietro IV (? – died 905)
- Giovanni II (?)
- Adalbertus (by 955 – 983 or later)
- Joannes (III) (before 997 – after 1007)

==== 1000 to 1400 ====
- Frogerio (after 1019 – Resigned 1028)
- Alfredo (after 1031 – 1055)
- Lamberto (after 1062 – after 1074)
- Sigifredus (1074 –1079)
- Gerardus (I) (1079–1089)
- Bernardus (1096–1104)
- Victor (II) (1108–1129)
- Enrico (I) (1130–1145)
- Gerardo Grassi (1145–1165)
- Giovanni (IV) (attested 1169 – 1187)
- Gerardo di Gisla (1187–1198)
- Gerardo Ariosti (1198 – resigned 1213)
- Enrico della Fratta (1213–1240)
  - Ottaviano degli Ubaldini, Procurator (1240–1244)
- Giacomo Boncambi, O.P. (1244–1260)
- Ottaviano II degli Ubaldini (1261–1295)
- Schiatta degli Ubaldini (1295 – died 1298)
- Giovanni Savelli, O.P. (1299 – died 1301)
- Uberto Avvocati (19 September 1301 – June 1322)
- Arnaldo Sabatier di Cahors (1322 –1330)
- Stefano Ugonet (1331–1332)
- Bertrando Tessendari (5 June 1332 – 1339)
- Beltramino Parravicini (5 September 1340 – died 1350)
- Giovanni di Naso, O.P. (13 October 1350 – died 3 August 1361)
- Almerico Cathy (18 August 1361 – 1371)
- Bernardo de Bonnevalle (18 July 1371 – deposed 1378)
  - Filippo Carafa (apostolic administrator: 28 September 1378 – died 1389)
- Cosimo de' Migliorati (19 June 1389 – resigned 1390)
- Rolando da Imola, O.P. (1390)
- Bartolomeo Raimondi, O.S.B. (21 August 1392 – died 16 June 1406)

==== after 1400 ====
- Antonio Correr, C.R.S.G.A. (31 March 1407 – resigned 2 November 1412)
- Giovanni di Michele, O.S.B. (1412 – died 5 January 1417)
- Niccolò Albergati, O.Cart. (4 January 1417 – died 9 May 1443)
  - Cardinal Ludovico Trevisano (apostolic administrator: 9 May 1443 – resigned 1444)
- Nicolò Zanolini, C.R.L. (bishop-elect 1444)
- Tomaso Parentucelli (1444–1447)
- Giovanni del Poggio (Jean de Podio) (22 March 1447 – died 15 December 1447)
- Filippo Calandrini (1447–1476)
  - Francesco Gonzaga, Administrator (26 July 1476 – died 21 October 1483)
- Cardinal Giuliano della Rovere (1483–1502)
- Giovanni Stefano Ferrero (1502–1510)
  - Cardinal Francesco Alidosi, Administrator (18 October 1510 – 24 May 1511)
- Cardinal Achille Grassi (24 May 1511 – 22 November 1523)
- Cardinal Lorenzo Campeggio (1523–1525)
  - Cardinal Andrea della Valle, Administrator (20 December 1525 – 19 March 1526)
- Cardinal Alessandro Campeggio (1526–1553)

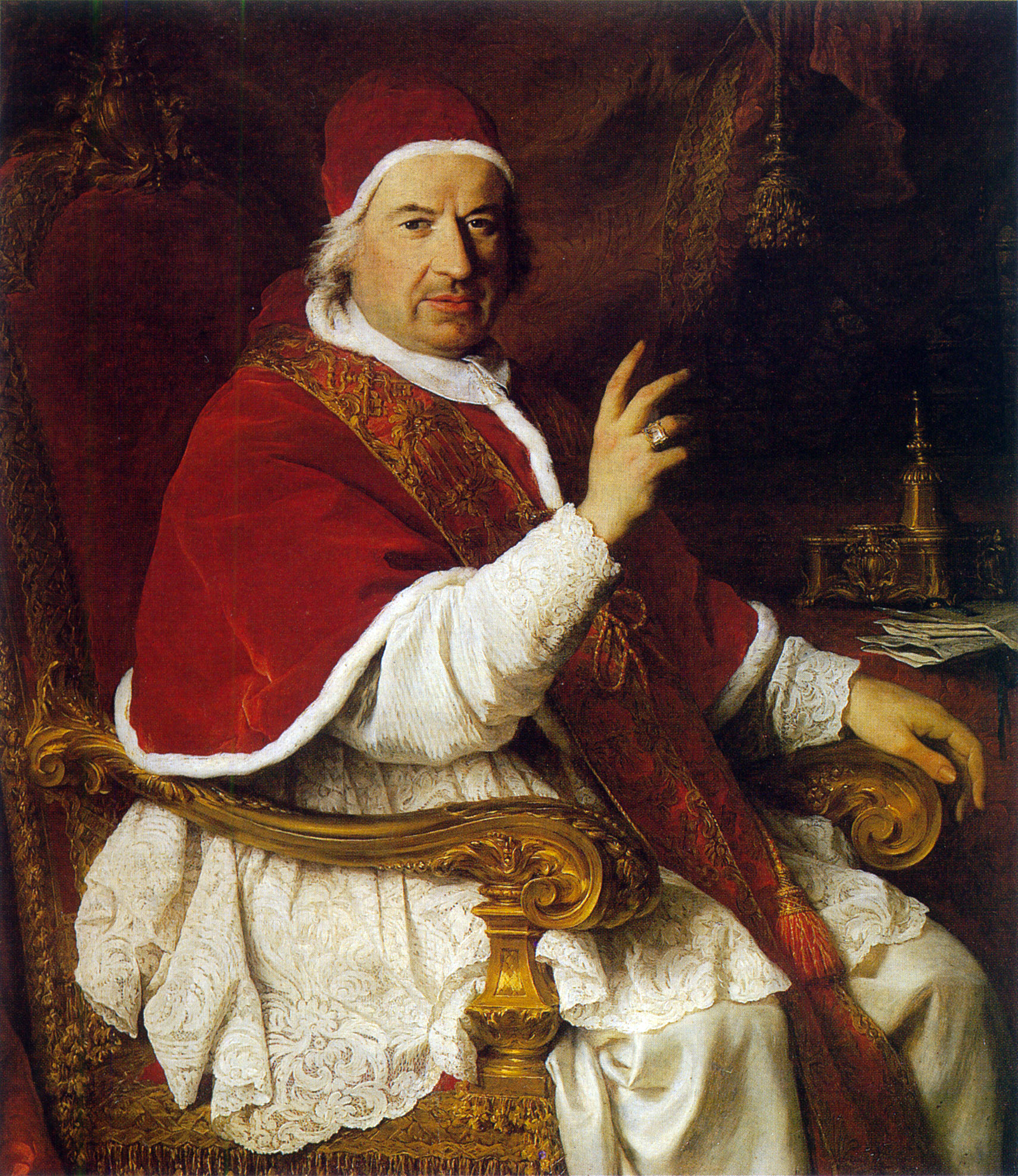
Cardinal Prospero Lambertini, Archbishop 1731–1754, then Pope Benedict XIV

- Giovanni Campeggio (1553–1563)
  - Cardinal Rannucio Farnese, Administrator (17 July 1564 – 28 October 1565)

=== Archbishops ===
- Cardinal Gabriele Paleotti (1566–1597)
- Alfonso Paleotti (1597–1610)
- Cardinal Scipione Caffarelli-Borghese (1610–1612)
- Cardinal Alessandro Ludovisi (1612–1621)
- Cardinal Ludovico Ludovisi (29 March 1621 – 18 November 1632)
- Cardinal Girolamo Colonna (24 November 1632 – 1645)
- Cardinal Niccolò Albergati-Ludovisi (1645–1651)
- Cardinal Girolamo Boncompagni (11 December 1651 – 24 January 1684)

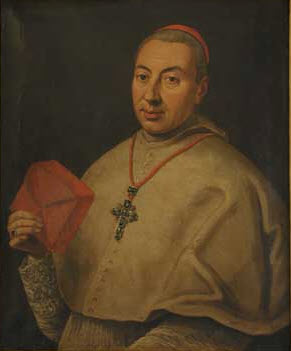
Cardinal Andrea Gioannetti, Archbishop 1775–1800

Sede vacante (1684–1688)

- Cardinal Angelo Ranuzzi (1688–1689)
- Cardinal Giacomo Boncompagni (1690–1731)
- Cardinal Prospero Lorenzo Lambertini (30 April 1731 – 17 August 1740)
- Cardinal Vincenzo Malvezzi (14 January 1754 – 3 December 1775)
- Cardinal Andrea Giovanetti (15 December 1775 – 8 April 1800)
- Cardinal Carlo Oppizoni (20 September 1802 – 31 May 1831)
- Cardinal Michele Viale-Prelà (28 September 1855 – 15 May 1860)
- Cardinal Filippo Maria Guidi, O.P. (1863–1871)
- Cardinal Carlo Luigi Morichini (1871–1876)

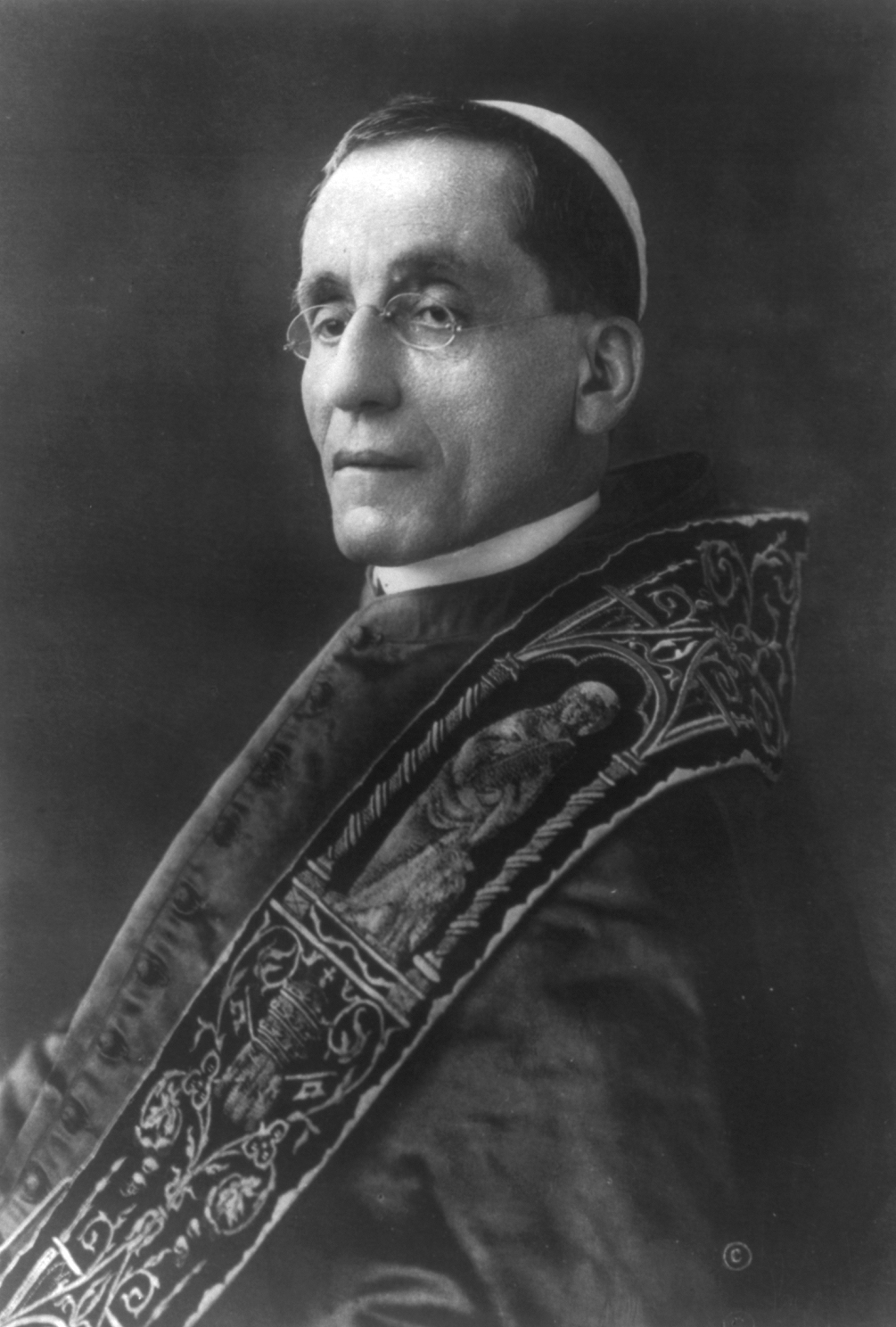
Cardinal Giacomo della Chiesa, Archbishop 1907–1914, then Pope Benedict XV

- Cardinal Lucido Parocchi (12 March 1877 – 28 June 1882)
- Cardinal Francesco Battaglini (3 July 1882 – 8 July 1892)
- Cardinal Serafino Vannutelli (16 January 1893 – 12 June 1893)
- Cardinal Domenico Svampa (1894–1907)
- Cardinal Giacomo della Chiesa (18 December 1907 – 3 September 1914)
- Cardinal Giorgio Gusmini (8 September 1914 – 24 August 1921)
- Cardinal Giovanni Nasalli Rocca di Corneliano (21 November 1921 – 13 March 1952)
- Cardinal Giacomo Lercaro (19 April 1952 – 12 February 1968)
- Cardinal Antonio Poma (12 February 1968 – 11 February 1983)
- Enrico Manfredini (18 March 1983 – 16 December 1983)
- Cardinal Giacomo Biffi (19 April 1984 – 16 December 2003)
- Cardinal Carlo Caffarra (16 December 2003 – 27 October 2015)
- Cardinal Matteo Zuppi (27 October 2015 – present)

== Patrimony ==
In 2012 the owner of FAAC, an international automatic gate manufacturer, Michelangelo Manini died. He left his entire estate worth an estimated €1.7 billion to the diocese, including 66% of FAAC shares. Eventually the Archdiocese acquired the entire company. Cardinal Caffarra established a three person trust to manage the business with the diocese receiving a share of this. In 2015 it received €5 million, in 2019 it was €10 million. This money was distributed to schools and the poor, the homeless and migrants.

== Books ==
=== Reference works for bishops ===
- Gams, Pius Bonifatius (1873). Series episcoporum Ecclesiae catholicae: quotquot innotuerunt a beato Petro apostolo (in Latin). Ratisbon: Typis et Sumptibus Georgii Josephi Manz. pp. 675–677.
- Eubel, Conradus, ed. (1913). Hierarchia catholica (in Latin). Vol. 1 (second ed.). Münster: Libreria Regensbergiana. (in Latin)
- Eubel, Conradus, ed. (1914). Hierarchia catholica (in Latin). Vol. 2 (second ed.). Münster: Libreria Regensbergiana.
- Eubel, Conradus; Gulik, Guilelmus (1923). Hierarchia catholica (in Latin). Vol. 3 3 (second ed.). Münster: Libreria Regensbergiana.
- Gauchat, Patritius (Patrice) (1935). Hierarchia catholica. Vol. IV (1592-1667). Münster: Libraria Regensbergiana.
- Ritzler, Remigius; Sefrin, Pirminus (1952). Hierarchia catholica medii et recentis aevi. Vol. Tomus V (1667-1730). Patavii: Messagero di S. Antonio.
- Ritzler, Remigius; Sefrin, Pirminus (1958). Hierarchia catholica medii et recentis aevi. Vol. Tomus VI (1730-1799). Patavii: Messagero di S. Antonio.
- Ritzler, Remigius; Sefrin, Pirminus (1968). Hierarchia Catholica medii et recentioris aevi (in Latin). Vol. VII (1800–1846). Monasterii: Libreria Regensburgiana.
- Remigius Ritzler; Pirminus Sefrin (1978). Hierarchia catholica Medii et recentioris aevi (in Latin). Vol. VIII (1846–1903). Il Messaggero di S. Antonio.
- Pięta, Zenon (2002). Hierarchia catholica medii et recentioris aevi (in Latin). Vol. IX (1903–1922). Padua: Messagero di San Antonio. ISBN 978-88-250-1000-8.

=== Studies ===
- Amorini, Serafino; Bosi, Giuseppe (1857). Manuale storico-statistico-topografico della arcidiocesi Bolognese (in Italian). Bologna.
- Cappelletti, Giuseppe (1845). Le chiese d'Italia: dalla loro origine sino ai nostri giorni : opera (in Italian). Venezia: G. Antonelli. pp. 443–582.
- Guidicini, Giuseppe (1883). Notizie diverse relative ai vescovi di Bologna da san Zama ad Oppizzoni (in Italian). Bologna: Società tipografica Già.
- Kehr, Paul Fridolin (1906). Italia Pontificia Vol. V: Aemilia, sive Provincia Ravennas. Berlin: Weidmann, pp. 242–297. (in Latin).
- Lanzoni, Francesco (1907). San Petronio vescovo di Bologna nella storia e nella leggenda (in Italian). Roma: Pustet.
- Lanzoni, Francesco (1927). Le diocesi d'Italia dalle origini al principio del secolo VII (an. 604). Faenza: F. Lega, pp. 778–790. (in Italian)
- Lanzoni, Francesco (1832). ed. G. Cantagalli. Cronotassi dei vescovi di Bologna dai primordi alla fine del secolo XIII. Bologna 1932. (in Italian)
- Prodi, Paolo; Paolini, Lorenzo (1997) "Cronotassi dei vescovi di Bologna", in: Storia della Chiesa di Bologna. Bergamo: Bolis 1997. pp. 384–387. (in Italian)
- Robertson, Ian (2002). Tyranny under the Mantle of St Peter: Pope Paul II and Bologna. Turnhout: Brepols 2002. [Brepols Late Medieval and Early Modern Studies, 5].
- Savioli-Fontana, Lodovico Victor (1795). Annali Bolognesi (in Italian and Latin). Vol. III, Part II. Bassano. [original documents]
- Schwartz, Gerhard (1907). Die Besetzung der Bistümer Reichsitaliens unter den sächsischen und salischen Kaisern: mit den Listen der Bischöfe, 951-1122. Leipzig: B.G. Teubner. pp. 162–165. (in German)
- Sigonio, Carlo (1586). Caroli Sigonii De episcopis Bononiensibus libri quinque (in Latin). Bologna: Alexandrum Benatium. [often cited, but highly unreliable]
- Tomba, Filippo Nerio (1787). Serie cronologica de'vescovi ed arcivescovi di Bologna purgata da molti errori (in Italian). Bologna: Stamperia Longhi.
- Ughelli, Ferdinando; Coleti, Niccolo (1717). Italia sacra sive de Episcopis Italiae (in Latin). Vol. Tomus secundus (II) (secunda ed.). Venice: Apud Sebastianum Coleti. pp. 3–55.
