= Giacomo Lercaro =

Italian Cardinal

His Eminence Giacomo Lercaro
- Cardinal, Archbishop of Bologna
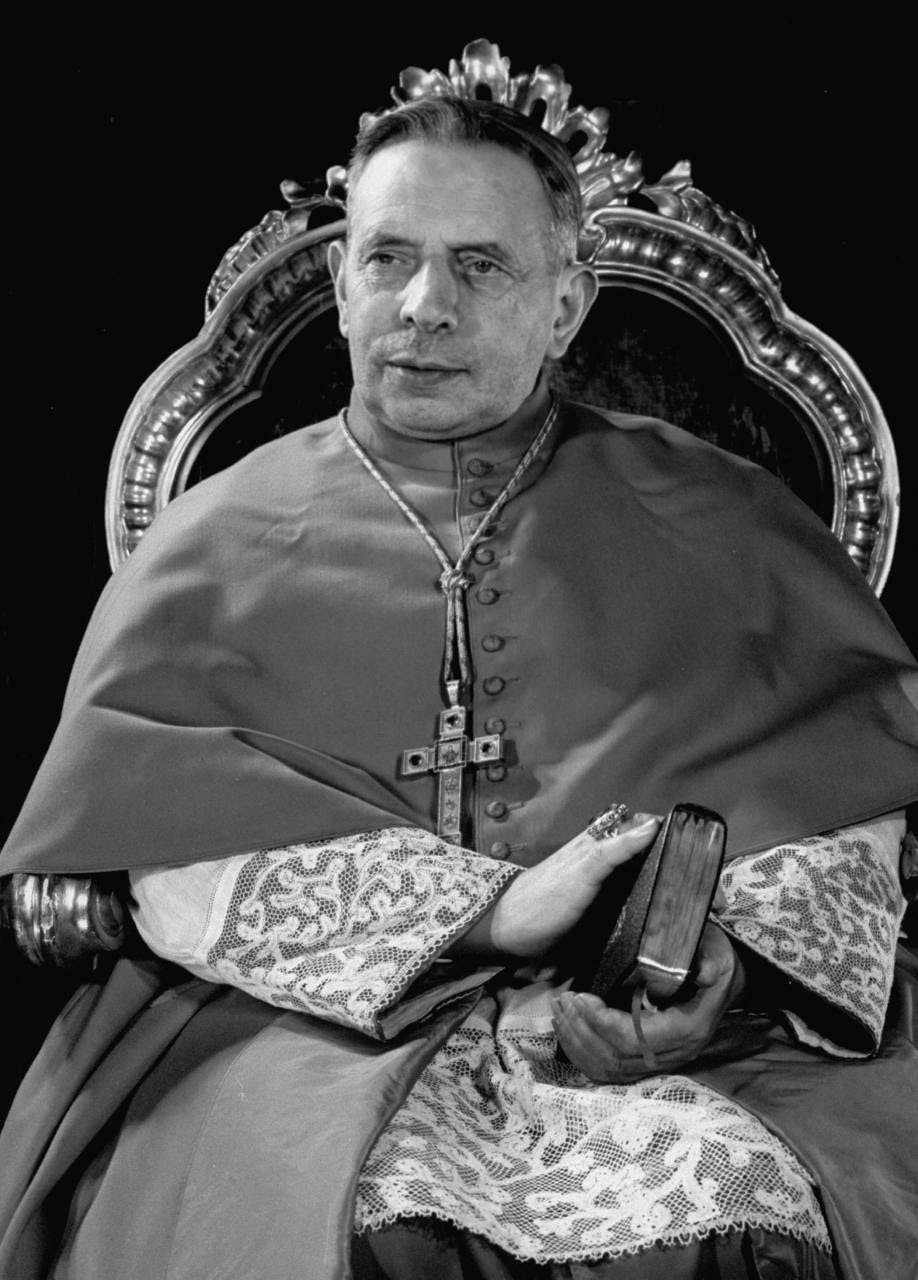
- Photograph by Dmitri Kessel, 1954
- Church: Catholic Church
- Archdiocese: Bologna
- Appointed: 19 April 1952
- Installed: 22 June 1952
- Term ended: 12 February 1968
- Predecessor: Giovanni Battista Nasalli Rocca di Corneliano
- Successor: Antonio Poma
- Other post: Cardinal-Priest of Santa Maria in Traspontina (1953–76)
- Previous posts: Archbishop of Ravenna (1947–52); Bishop of Cervia (1947–52)

Orders
- Ordination: 25 July 1914 by Ildefonso Vincenzo Pisani
- Consecration: 19 March 1947 by Giuseppe Siri
- Created cardinal: 12 January 1953 by Pius XII
- Rank: Cardinal-Priest

Personal details
- Born: Giacomo Lercaro; 28 October 1891 Quinto al Mare, Genoa, Kingdom of Italy
- Died: 18 October 1976 (aged 84) San Lazzaro di Savena, Bologna, Italy
- Education: Pontifical Biblical Institute
- Motto: Mater mea fiducia mea
- Coat of arms

Styles of Giacomo Lercaro
- Reference style: His Eminence
- Spoken style: Your Eminence
- Religious style: Cardinal
- Informal style: Cardinal
- See: Bologna

Giacomo Lercaro (28 October 1891 – 18 October 1976) was an Italian cardinal of the Roman Catholic Church who served as Archbishop of Ravenna from 1947 to 1952, and Archbishop of Bologna from 1952 to 1968. Pope Pius XII made him a cardinal in 1953.

== Biography ==
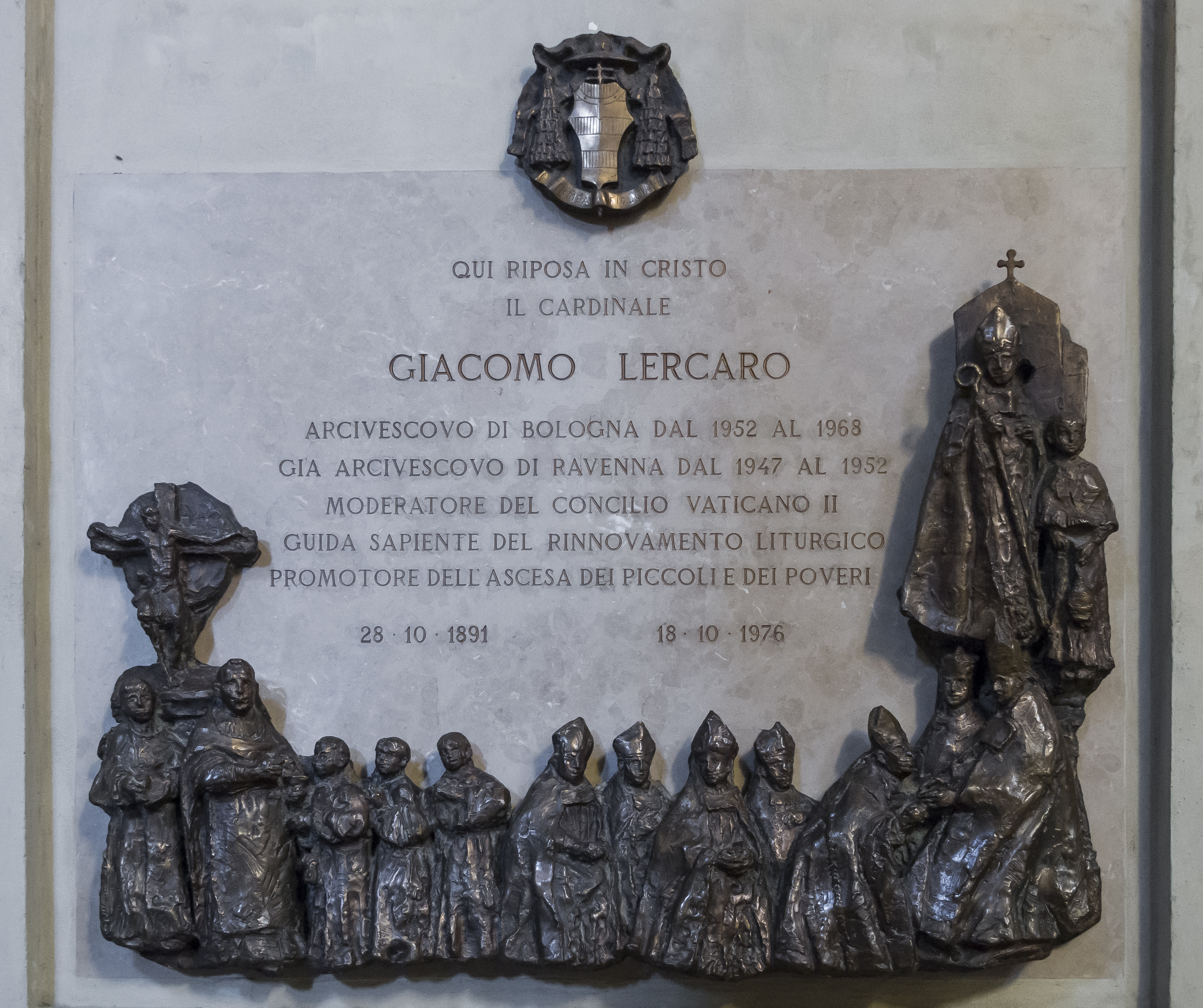
Tombstone of Cardinal Lercaro in the San Pietro Cathedral, Bologna

=== Early life and ordination ===
Giacomo Lercaro was born in Quinto al Mare, Genoa, as the eighth of nine children. He came from a family of seamen, and two of his brothers, Amedeo and Attilio, also entered religion. From 1902 to 1914, Lercaro attended the archdiocesan seminary in Genoa. He was ordained a priest on 25 July 1914 by Archbishop Ildefonso Pisani, and four months later, in November, travelled to Rome to study at the Pontifical Biblical Institute.

=== Pastoral and theological work ===
When Italy entered World War I, Lercaro was forced to change posts and become a military chaplain until the war ended in 1918. In 1918, he became prefect of the Seminary of Genoa, where his brother Amedeo was rector, and would remain in that post until 1923. He also served as substitute professor of theology (1921–1923) and professor of sacred scripture and patrology (1923–1927). In 1927, he became a teacher of religion in secondary school and became involved in numerous student movements in the Genoa district.

=== Archbishop ===
He received his episcopal consecration on 19 March 1947 from Archbishop Giuseppe Siri, with Archbishop Angleo Rossini and Bishop Francesco Canessa serving as co-consecrators. In the consistory of 12 January 1953, Lercaro was created Cardinal-Priest of Santa Maria in Traspontina by Pius XII.

=== Cardinal ===
During his early years as a cardinal, Lercaro established his first contacts with Angelo Roncalli and became well known for the way in which he turned his episcopal palace into an orphanage. Although he had been seen by Vatican watchers ever since 1953 as a possible successor to Pius XII and was listed by l'Osservatore Romano as a papabile, his reputation as the most idiosyncratic of all the cardinals and the desire for a transitional pontiff saw him passed over in favor of Roncalli in 1958.

A friend of the Freemason and piduist Umberto Ortolani, who had grown up economically and politically in Bologna, he was one of the first members of the Catholic hierarchy to establish a dialogue with the Communists. Generally considered papabile in the 1963 papal conclave closest to the vision of John XXIII, Lercaro, however, was considered too liberal by most of his fellow cardinal electors to be elected; Giovanni Battista Montini ultimately won.

Although Cardinal Lercaro was the first President of the Consilium, the papal body tasked with reforming the liturgical books of the Roman Rite according the Second Vatican Council's calls for liturgical reform, his advancing age saw him gradually disappear from prominence within the Church as the 1960s drew to a close. On 12 February 1968, Cardinal Lercaro was forced to step down from his position as Archbishop of Bologna and in 1971, he lost his right to participate in any future conclave upon reaching the age of eighty according to the then-recent motu proprio Ingravescentem aetatem.

=== Death ===
Lercaro died from cardiac arrest in Bologna, ten days short of his 85th birthday. He was buried in the metropolitan cathedral of that city.

== Views ==
=== Anti-fascism ===
His involvement in these student movements gave Lercaro a great interest in engaging Catholic theology with modern culture, and during the war he became one of the most prominent anti-fascists within the Church, preaching steadfastly against Nazism and offering support in his home for those persecuted by Mussolini—most notably for Italian Jews whose persecution began as a result of Italy's collaboration with Nazi Germany. At one point during World War II, Lercaro was forced to operate under the alias of "Father Lorenzo Gusmini" and live in a vacant monastery cell to avoid being killed by Nazi collaborators.

=== Anti-communism ===
Lercaro's reputation as an outspoken critic of communism is believed to be a contributing factor in Pope Pius XII's decision to make him the first Archbishop of Ravenna (31 January 1947) and then the twentieth Archbishop of Bologna (19 April 1952), both considered among the largest Italian cities under communist rule.

=== Second Vatican Council ===
Even though Lercaro felt that Pope John was moving much too quickly when he first announced the Second Vatican Council in late 1959, he later sat on its board of presidency and became regarded as one of the main architects of the council's liturgical reforms as he was the president of the Consilium.

=== Church of the poor ===
Cardinal Lercaro was also the first to popularize the theme of a "Church of the poor", which was developed further in Latin America during the 1970s. Pope Leo XIV recalls his observation that this message was "not simply one theme among others, but in some sense the only theme of the Council as a whole". During his time as archbishop of Bologna, where the most popular political party was the Italian Communist Party, he tried to build a dialogue with the members of this party.

== See also ==
- Umberto Ortolani

Preceded by	President of the Council for the Implementation of the Constitution on the Sacred Liturgy; 1964–1968	Succeeded by Benno Gut
