= Giorgio Gusmini =

His Eminence Giorgio Gusmini
- Archbishop of Bologna
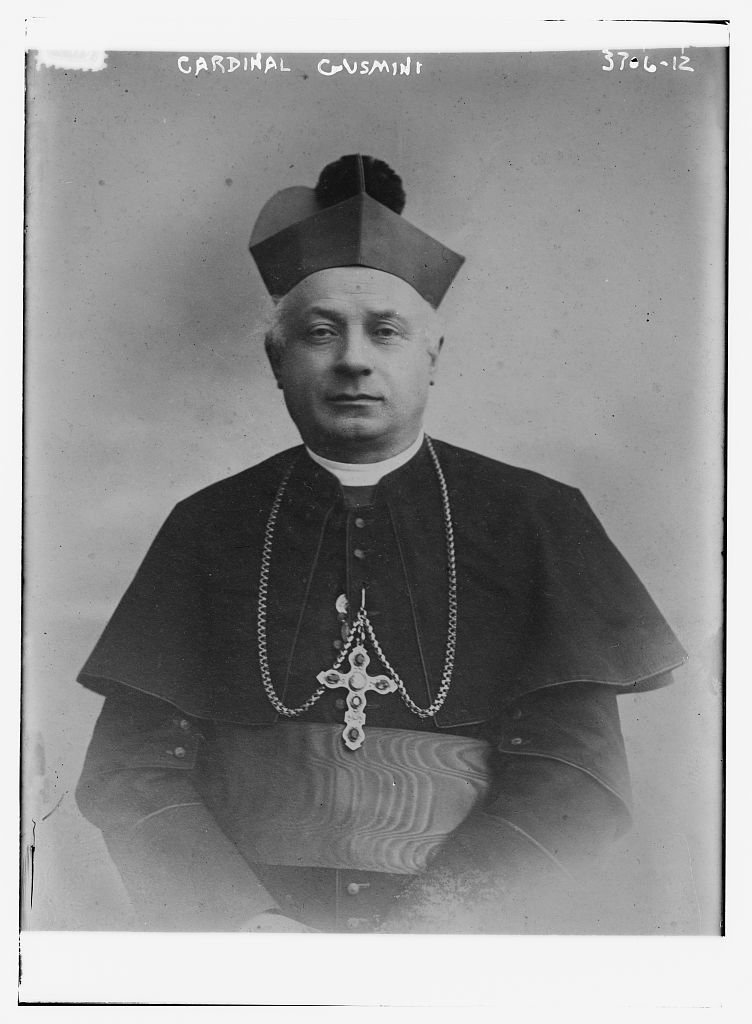
- Gusmini circa 1915.
- Church: Roman Catholic Church
- Archdiocese: Bologna
- See: Bologna
- Appointed: 8 September 1914
- Predecessor: Giacomo della Chiesa
- Successor: Giovanni Battista Nasalli Rocca di Corneliano
- Other post: Cardinal-Priest of Santa Susanna (1915–21)
- Previous post: Bishop of Foligno (1910–14)

Orders
- Ordination: 8 September 1878 by Giulio Lenti
- Consecration: 16 May 1910 by Giacomo Maria Radini-Tedeschi
- Created cardinal: 6 December 1915 by Pope Benedict XV
- Rank: Cardinal-Priest

Personal details
- Born: Giorgio Gusmini; 9 December 1855 Gazzaniga, Kingdom of Lombardy–Venetia
- Died: 24 August 1921 (aged 65) Bologna, Kingdom of Italy
- Education: University of Padua; Pontifical Roman Athenaeum S. Apollinare
- Coat of arms

Styles of Giorgio Gusmini
- Reference style: His Eminence
- Spoken style: Your Eminence
- Informal style: Cardinal
- See: Bologna

Giorgio Gusmini (9 December 1855 – 24 August 1921) was a Cardinal of the Roman Catholic Church who served as Archbishop of Bologna.

== Biography ==
Giorgio Gusmini was born in Gazzaniga, Italy, as the son of Santo Gusmini and Maddalena Cagnoni. His father died when Giorgio was only five years old. He was educated at the local diocesan Seminary of Bergamo, from 1869 until 1875, when he was sent to Rome to study at the Pontifical Roman Athenaeum S. Apollinare. On 7 July 1878, he obtained a doctorate in theology.

=== Priesthood ===
He was ordained to the priesthood on 8 September 1878. He served as the Professor of letters and philosophy at the Seminary of Bergamo from 1882 until 1888. He was transferred to serve as the Professor of letters, philosophy and history at Collegio San Alessandro, Bergamo, where he stayed until 1890. He also worked in pastoral care in the diocese of Bergamo from 1878 to 1880. He was one of the founders of Società Cattolica Universitaria, now F.U.C.I. He returned to pastoral work in Bergamo from 1888 to 1910. He served as Archpriest and vicar forane in Clusone in 1902. He was created Privy chamberlain supra numerum on 16 December 1901 and was reappointed on 20 October 1903.

=== Episcopate ===
Pope Pius X appointed him as bishop of Foligno on 15 April 1910. He was consecrated on 17 May 1910, Bergamo, by Giacomo Radini-Tedeschi, Bishop of Bergamo. He spent four years in Foligno, until he was promoted to fill the vacancy in the metropolitan see of Bologna that resulted from the elevation of Giacomo della Chiesa to the Papacy.

=== Cardinalate ===
He was created and proclaimed Cardinal-Priest of Santa Susanna in the first consistory of the newly elected pope, Benedict XV, which was held on 6 December 1915.

He died in 1921 after a long illness. The funeral took place on 25 August in the metropolitan cathedral of Bologna.

Catholic Church titles
Preceded by Giacomo della Chiesa	Archbishop of Bologna; 8 September 1914 – 24 August 1921	Succeeded by Giovanni Nasalli Rocca di Corneliano
