= Dossiers =

Compilation album by Various artists
- Released: 1992
- Recorded: 1990 – 1992
- Genres: Electro; experimental; industrial
- Length: 70:13
- Label: Dossier
- Producer: Manfred Schiek

Dossiers is a various artists compilation album released in 1992 by Dossier.

== Track listing ==
No.	Title	Writer(s)	Artist	Length
1.	"Justice"	Darrin Huss; Jor Jenka	Vanishing Heat	0:23
2.	"Falling"	Bill Leeb; Rhys Fulber	Noise Unit	6:04
3.	"Self-Respect"	Gregory John McCormick	Shock Therapy	5:52
4.	"Secret Angel" (Live in Dresden)	Huss; David Kristian	Psyche	3:55
5.	"Walls"	Jonathan Sharp	New Mind	5:00
6.	"Sermon"	Leeb; Fulber	Delerium	7:29
7.	"Baby Face" (Jan Garber cover)	Harry Akst; Benny Davis	Vampire Rodents	2:32
8.	"When the Hall Cries"	Damon Edge	Chrome	3:29
9.	"Angst + War"	Nigel Degray	Marquee Moon	4:54
10.	"Live and Learn" (Big Guy Version)	McCormick	Shock Therapy	4:18
11.	"Misery" (Live in Dresden)	Huss; Kristian	Psyche	4:22
12.	"Ice Dream"	Sharp	New Mind	4:44
13.	"The Final Call"	Huss; Kristian	Vanishing Heat	0:55
14.	"Inside Out"	Leeb; Fulber	Front Line Assembly	4:15
15.	"Raid"	Chris Moriarty; Paul Lemos	Joined at the Head	4:04
16.	"Super 8 Love Tormentor"	Geoff Serle	Radius	5:38
17.	"Hind to Hind"	Lemos	Paul Lemos	2:19

== Personnel ==
Adapted from the Dossiers liner notes.

- Walter Herbert – cover art
- Manfred Schiek – production

== Release history ==
Region	Date	Label	Format	Catalog
Germany	1992	Dossier	CD	DCD 9037
