= Klaus Gamber =

Klaus Gamber (23 April 1919 – 2 June 1989) was a German Catholic liturgist.

Gamber was born in Ludwigshafen am Rhein in 1919. He was the author of Die Reform der römischen Liturgie, which was subsequently translated into English and published as The Reform of the Roman Liturgy: Its Problems and Background. He was one of the principal intellectual critics of the liturgical reforms brought under the papacy of Paul VI. His critical work was praised by Cardinal Joseph Ratzinger (the later Pope Benedict XVI). He is credited with being one of the academic inspirations behind the motu proprio Summorum Pontificum allowing broader use of the 1962 Roman Missal.

Gamber died in Regensburg in 1989.

== Bibliography ==
- Die Liturgie der Goten und der Armenier: Versuch einer Darstellung und Hinführung (Pustet) ISBN 9783791711904
- Ein kleines Kind, der ewige Gott: Bild und Botschaft von Christi Geburt (1980)
- Orientierung an der Orthodoxie: Die Tradition der Ostkirche als Richtschnur in Liturgie und Verkündigung (Pustet, 1981) ISBN 9783791707020
- Das Reich Gottes in uns: und die Einheit der Kirche (1981)
- Opfer und Mahl: Gedanken zur Feier der Eucharistie im Geist der Kirchenvater (Pustet, 1982) ISBN 9783791707785
- Alter und neuer Messritus: Der theologische Hintergrund der Liturgiereform (Pustet, 1983) ISBN 9783791708546
- Das Geheimnis der sieben Sterne: zur Symbolik der Apokalypse (1987)
- Zum Herrn hin!: Fragen um Kirchenbau und Gebet nach Osten (1987) ISBN 9783791711447
- The Reform of the Roman Liturgy: Its Problems and Background (Una Voce, 1993) ISBN 9781929291885
- The Modern Rite: Collected Essays on the Reform of the Liturgy (St. Michael's Abbey Press, 2002) ISBN 0-907077-37-4
- Sacrifice et mystère dans l'eucharistie (2005) ISBN 9782915025583
- Tournés vers le Seigneur! (2005) ISBN 9782906972124
