= Bologna Cathedral =

Cathedral in Bologna, Italy

Metropolitan Cathedral of Saint Peter Cattedrale Metropolitana di San Pietro
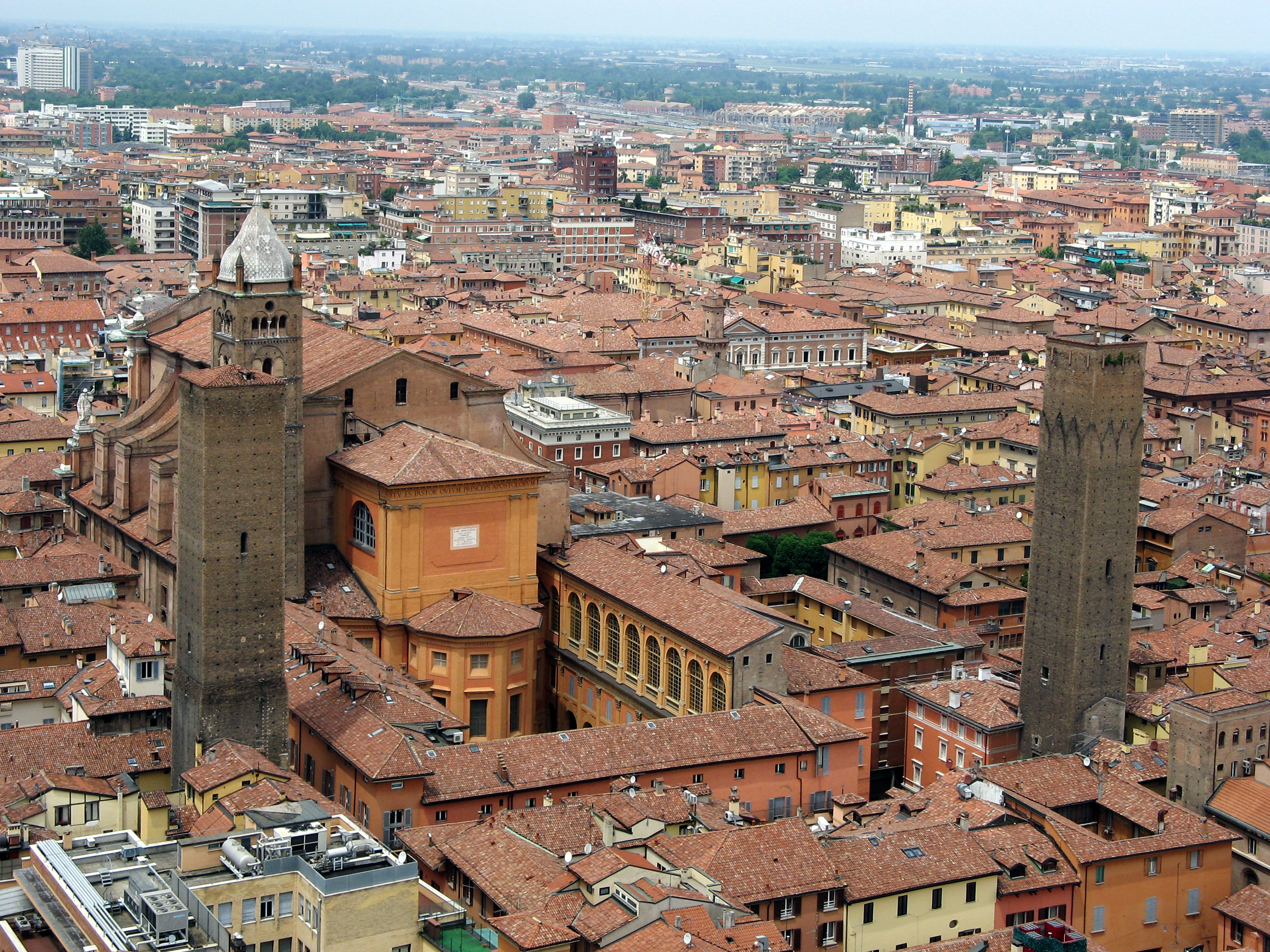
- Bologna Cathedral from the Torre degli Asinelli

Religion
- Affiliation: Roman Catholic Church
- Province: Archdiocese of Bologna
- Ecclesiastical or organisational status: Cathedral
- Year consecrated: 1184
- Status: Active

Location
- Location: Bologna, Italy
- Interactive map of Metropolitan Cathedral of Saint Peter; Cattedrale Metropolitana di San Pietro
- Coordinates: 44°29′45″N 11°20′36″E

Architecture
- Type: Church
- Style: Baroque
- Groundbreaking: 910
- Completed: 18th century

Bologna Cathedral, formally known as the Metropolitan Cathedral of Saint Peter (Italian: Cattedrale Metropolitana di San Pietro, also called Cattedrale di Bologna), is the cathedral of Bologna, Italy, and the seat of the Archbishop of Bologna. Dedicated to Saint Peter, most of the present structure dates to the 17th century, with some parts dating back to the late 16th century.

== History ==
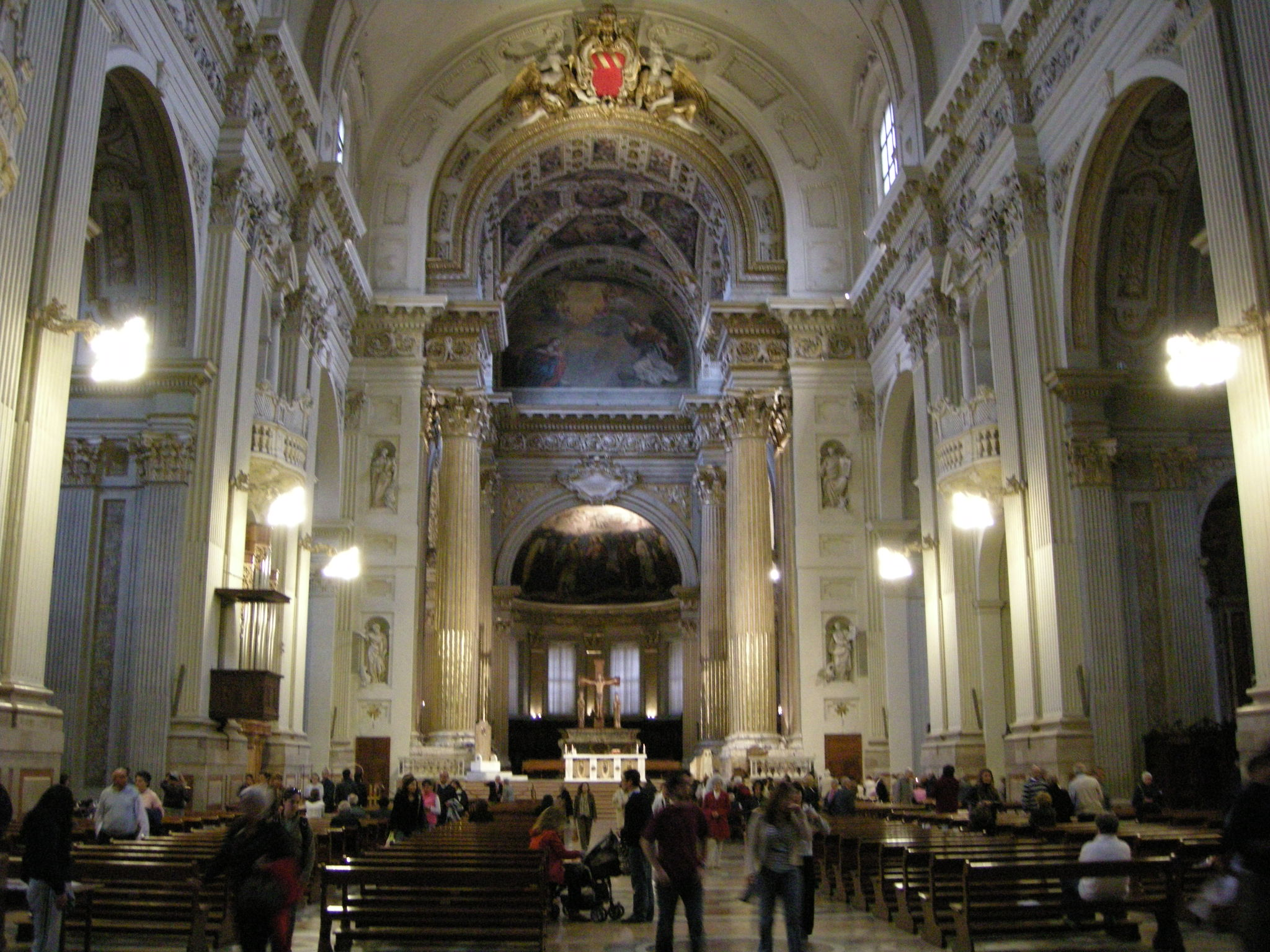
Cathedral interior, looking towards the high altar

There was already a cathedral on the site (on the present Via Indipendenza) in 1028, accompanied by a pre-Romanesque campanile with a circular base (in the architectural tradition of Ravenna). This church was destroyed by a devastating fire in 1141. It was reconstructed and consecrated by Pope Lucius III in 1184.

In 1396 a high portico (protiro) was added to the west front, which was rebuilt in 1467. From about 1477 the Ferrarese painters Francesco del Cossa and Ercole de' Roberti worked in the Garganelli Chapel on the creation of a cycle of frescoes which later had a significant influence on Niccolò dell'Arca and Michelangelo. The frescoes were lost in subsequent reconstruction except for a very few fragments.

In 1582 Pope Gregory XIII elevated the Bishop of Bologna to Archbishop, and accordingly the cathedral was elevated to the rank of "metropolitan church" (a bishop's seat with jurisdiction over other bishops and dioceses in its territory).

By order of Cardinal Gabriele Paleotti a radical remodelling of the interior of the building began in 1575, of which the crypt and the Greater Chapel (Capella Maggiore) survive. The alterations were so extensive however as to cause the vaults to collapse in 1599, and the decision was then made to rebuild the main part of the cathedral from scratch. Work on the new building started in 1605. A new façade was added between 1743 and 1747, to designs by the architect Alfonso Torreggiani, on the instructions of Pope Benedict XIV.

== Description ==
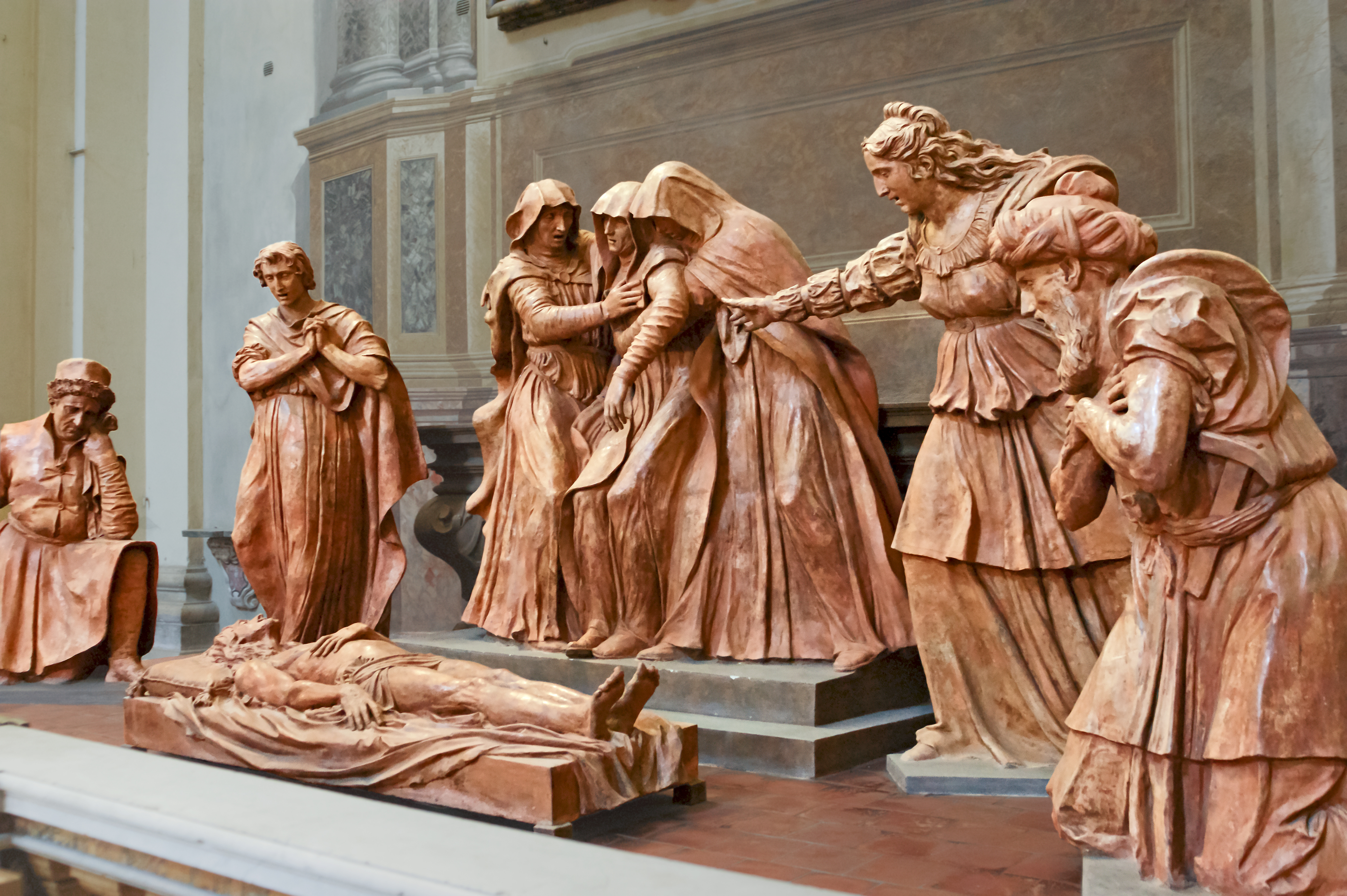
Alfonso Lombardi, Compianto su Cristo morto (early 16th century)

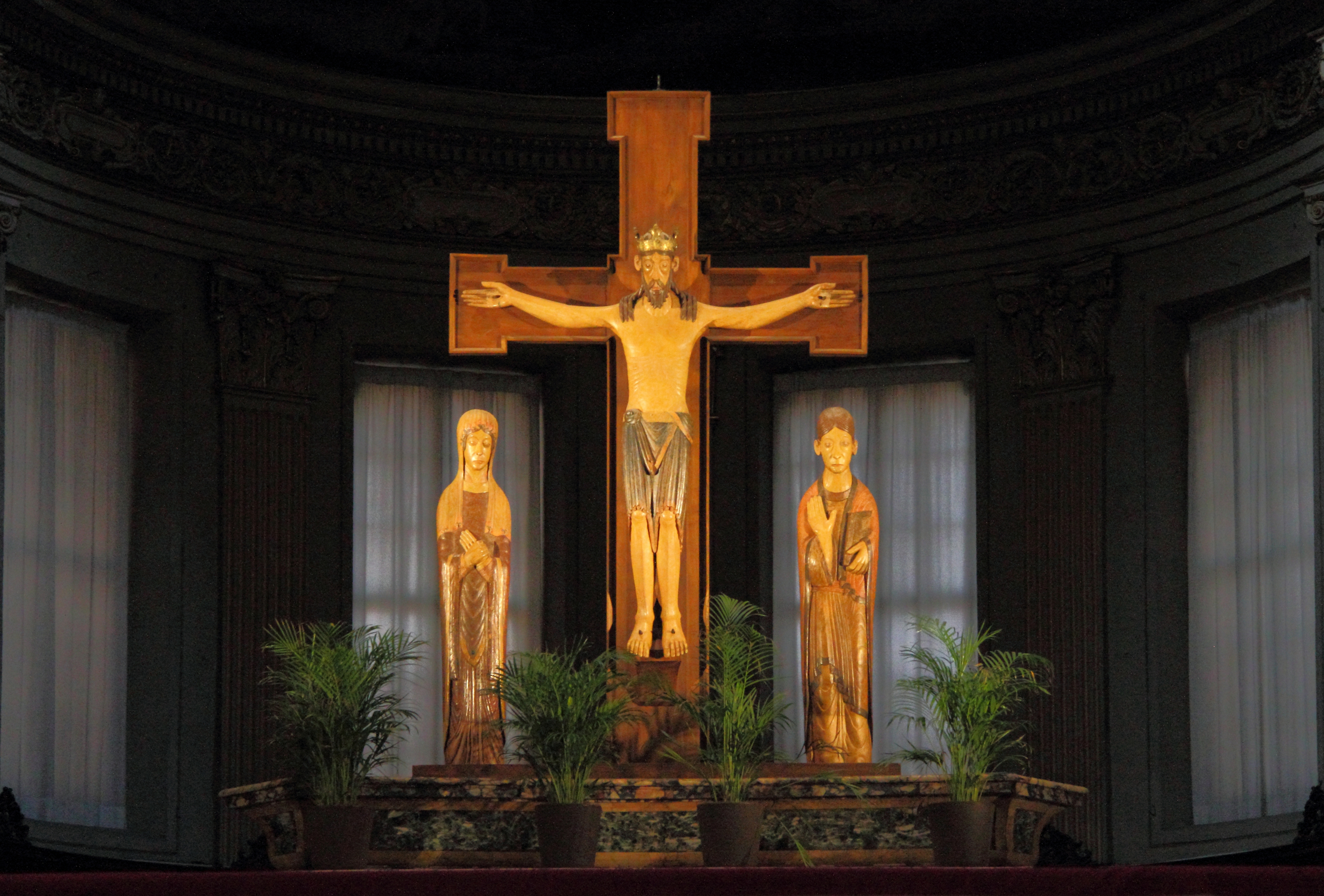
Romanesque altar crucifix from cedar wood, 12th century

The present interior is emphatically Baroque, giving an impression of majesty and grandeur. Among the works of art are an Annunciation by Ludovico Carracci (a fresco in the central lunette of the presbytery), a Romanesque Crucifixion in cedarwood, and a sculptured group in terracotta depicting the Compianto su Cristo morto ("Lament over the Dead Christ"), by Alfonso Lombardi, of the early 16th century. In the apse are early 20th-century paintings by Cesare Mauro Trebbi (1847–1931) including Saint Anne in Glory.

== Campanile ==
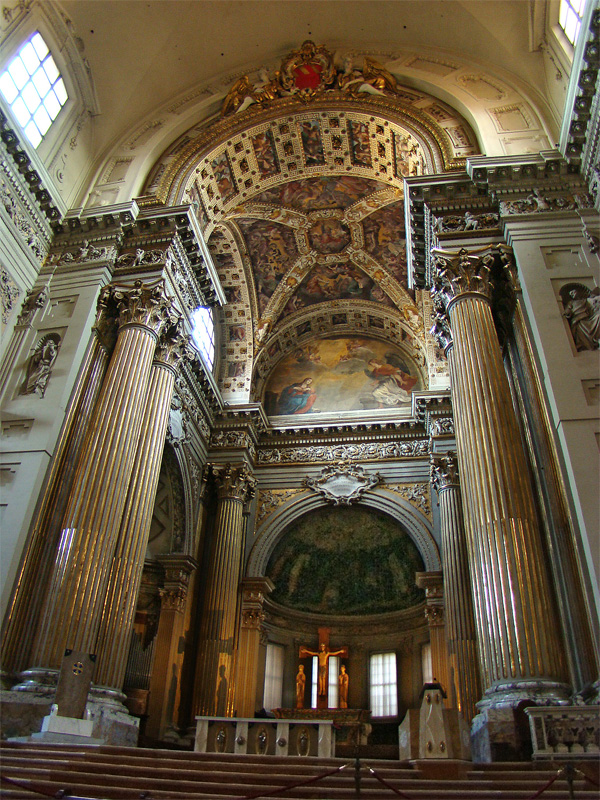
Cappella Maggiore

The early campanile is 40 metres (130 feet) tall with a circular base has never been rebuilt. Instead, a new, external bell tower with a height of 70 metres (230 feet) was built around the existing one sometime between the 12th and 13th centuries. The campanile is the second tallest tower in Bologna, behind the Asinelli Tower.

The bell tower accommodates the bell known as "La Nonna", which at a weight of 3,300 kilograms (7,300 lb) is the largest bell that can be rung by the Bolognese method of bell-ringing.

== Sources ==
- Website of the Archdiocese of Bologna: Cathedral (in Italian)
- Website of the Direzione Regionale per i Beni Culturali e Paesagistici della Emilia-Romagna: Chiesa cattedrale metropolitana di San Pietro (in Italian)
