= Vincenzo Zarri =

Italian Roman Catholic bishop (1929–2026)

The Most Reverend Vincenzo Zarri
- Bishop of Forlì-Bertinoro
- Church: Roman Catholic Church
- Archdiocese: Ravenna-Cervia
- Diocese: Forlì-Bertinoro
- Appointed: 9 April 1988
- Term ended: 12 November 2005
- Predecessor: Giovanni Proni
- Successor: Lino Pizzi
- Previous posts: Auxiliary Bishop of Bologna and Titular Bishop of Luni (1976–1988)

Orders
- Ordination: 25 July 1952 by Giacomo Lercaro
- Consecration: 29 June 1976 by Antonio Poma, Marco Cé, Benito Cocchi

Personal details
- Born: 23 October 1929 Bologna, Kingdom of Italy
- Died: 9 January 2026 (aged 96) Bologna, Italy

Vincenzo Zarri (23 October 1929 – 9 January 2026) was an Italian Roman Catholic prelate who served as Bishop of Forlì-Bertinoro from 1988 to 2005. He had previously served been auxiliary bishop of the Archdiocese of Bologna from 1976 to 1988.

== Early life and education ==
Zarri was born in Bologna, Italy, on 23 October 1929. He entered the Archiepiscopal Seminary of Bologna in 1940, where he completed his philosophical and theological studies in preparation for the priesthood.

== Priesthood ==
Zarri was ordained a priest by Cardinal Giacomo Lercaro at the Basilica of San Giacomo Maggiore, Bologna, on 25 July 1952. Following his ordination, Zarri served as a lector and vice-rector of the Archiepiscopal Seminary of Bologna. He later became rector of the institute for adult vocations and a canon of the Basilica of San Petronio in Bologna. From 1963 he served as rector of the archiepiscopal seminary and subsequently as parish priest and urban vicar of the cathedral in Bologna.

== Episcopate ==
On 24 May 1976, Pope Paul VI appointed Zarri as Auxiliary Bishop of Bologna and Titular Bishop of Luni. He was consecrated a bishop on 29 June 1976 in Bologna Cathedral by Cardinal Antonio Poma with bishopss Marco Cé and Benito Cocchi as co-consecrators. He served as vicar general of the Archdiocese of Bologna and later as diocesan administrator following the death of Archbishop Enrico Manfredini.

On 9 April 1988, Pope John Paul II appointed Zarri as Bishop of Forlì-Bertinoro. He was installed on 29 May 1988, succeeding Giovanni Proni. Pope Benedict XVI accepted his resignation on 12 November 2005 upon reaching the age of 75. Zarri served as apostolic administrator until the installation of his successor, Lino Pizzi, in January 2006.

== Retirement and death ==
After his retirement, Zarri returned to Bologna, where he resided at the casa del clero. Despite advancing age, he continued limited pastoral ministry, including administering confirmations, preaching and serving as a confessor. He died in Bologna on 9 January 2026 at the age of 96.

== Selected works ==
- Monsignor Cesare Sarti: tratti biografici e scritti (Bologna, 1971)
- Celebriamo la salvezza del Signore: omelie e discorsi (Forlì, 2001)
- Un canto di lode al Signore. Benedetta Bianchi Porro (2013)

Catholic Church titles
Preceded by Giovanni Proni	Bishop of Forlì-Bertinoro; 1988–2005	Succeeded by Lino Pizzi
Preceded by Position established	Titular Bishop of Luni; 1976–1988	Succeeded by Ján Sokol
Preceded by —	Auxiliary Bishop of Bologna; 1976–1988	Succeeded by —
