= José Freire Falcão =

Roman Catholic Archbishop Emeritus of Brasília (1925–2021)

His Eminence Jose Freire Falcão
- Cardinal; Archbishop Emeritus of Brasília
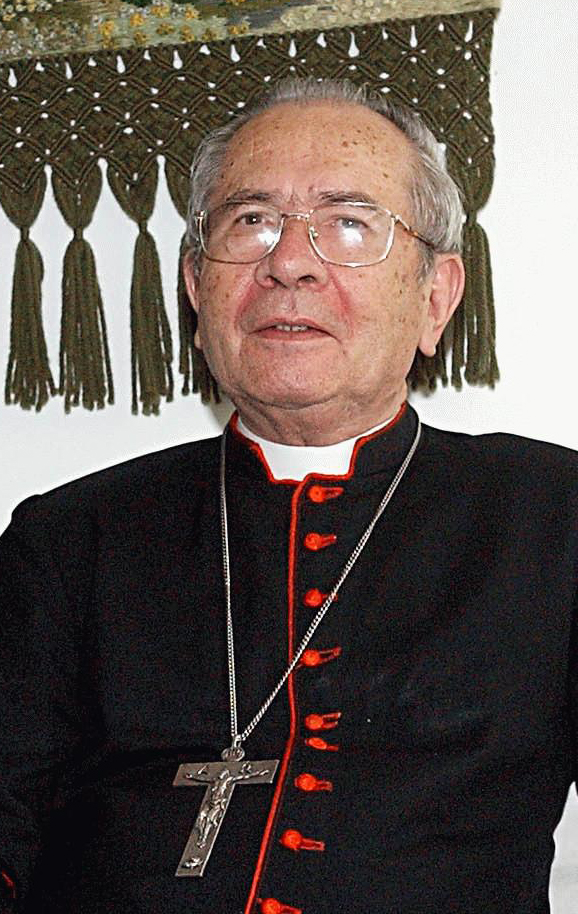
- Falcão, 9 March 2003
- Church: Roman Catholic Church
- Archdiocese: Brasília
- See: Brasília
- Appointed: 15 February 1984
- Term ended: 28 January 2004
- Predecessor: José Newton de Almeida Baptista
- Successor: João Braz de Aviz
- Previous posts: Titular Bishop of Vardimissa (1967); Coadjutor Bishop of Limoeiro do Norte (1967); Bishop of Limoeiro do Norte (1967–1971); Archbishop of Teresina (1971–1984); Second Vice-President of the Latin American Episcopal Council (1987–1991)

Orders
- Ordination: 19 June 1949
- Consecration: 17 June 1967 by José de Medeiros Delgado
- Created cardinal: 28 June 1988 by Pope John Paul II
- Rank: Cardinal-Priest

Personal details
- Born: José Freire Falcão; 23 October 1925 Ererê, Brazil
- Died: 26 September 2021 (aged 95) Brasília, Brazil
- Motto: Servir em humildade
- Coat of arms

José Freire Falcão (Brazilian Portuguese: [ʒoˈzɛ ˈfɾejɾi fawˈkɐ̃w]; 23 October 1925 – 26 September 2021) was a Brazilian prelate of the Catholic Church who was archbishop of Brasília from 1984 to 2004. He was created a cardinal in 1988.

== Biography ==
José Freire Falcão was born on 23 October 1925, in Ererê in the state of Ceará. He entered the seminary in Fortaleza at the age of 14. He was ordained a priest on 19 June 1949.

He was teaching at the seminary and leading the diocesan liturgy commission when, on 24 April 1967, Pope Paul VI named him titular bishop of Vardimissa and bishop coadjutor of Limoeiro do Norte. He received his episcopal consecration on 17 June and succeeded as bishop on 19 August. He was transferred to the Archdiocese of Teresina on 25 November 1971.

Pope John Paul II appointed him archbishop of Brasília on 15 February 1984 and created him a cardinal on 28 June 1988, assigning him as a cardinal priest to San Luca a Via Prenestina.

He retired as archbishop of Brasília upon the appointment of his successor on 28 January 2004.

He was one of the cardinal electors who participated in the 2005 papal conclave that elected Pope Benedict XVI.

On 17 September 2021, Falcão was admitted to hospital as a precaution after being diagnosed with COVID-19. On 24 September, the Archdiocese of Brasília announced Falcão's health had deteriorated, that he was intubated and in grave condition after suffering kidney and respiratory complications. He died from complications of the virus on 26 September 2021, at the age of 95. His Funeral Mass and burial in the crypt of the cathedral took place the next day.

Catholic Church titles
Titular see created	— TITULAR — Titular Bishop of Vardimissa; 24 April 1967 – 19 August 1967	Succeeded by Bruno-Augustin Hippel
Preceded by Aureliano de Matos	Bishop of Limoeiro do Norte; 19 August 1967 – 25 November 1971	Succeeded by Pompeu Bezerra Bessa
Preceded by Avelar Brandão Vilela	Archbishop of Teresina; 25 November 1971 – 15 February 1984	Succeeded by Miguel Fenelon Câmara Filho
Preceded by José Newton de Almeida Baptista	Archbishop of Brasília; 15 February 1984 − 28 January 2004	Succeeded by João Braz de Aviz
Preceded by Clemente José Carlos de Gouvea Isnard	Second Vice-President of the Latin American Episcopal Council; 1987 – 1991	Succeeded by Tulio Manuel Chirivella Varela
Preceded by Antonio Poma	Cardinal Priest of San Luca a Via Prenestina; 28 June 1988 – 26 September 2021	Succeeded by Luis José Rueda Aparicio
Order of precedence
Preceded by Luiz Fux as President of the Supreme Federal Court	Brazilian order of precedence 6th in line as Brazilian cardinal	Followed by Ministers of State
