= Cardinal electors in the 2005 conclave =

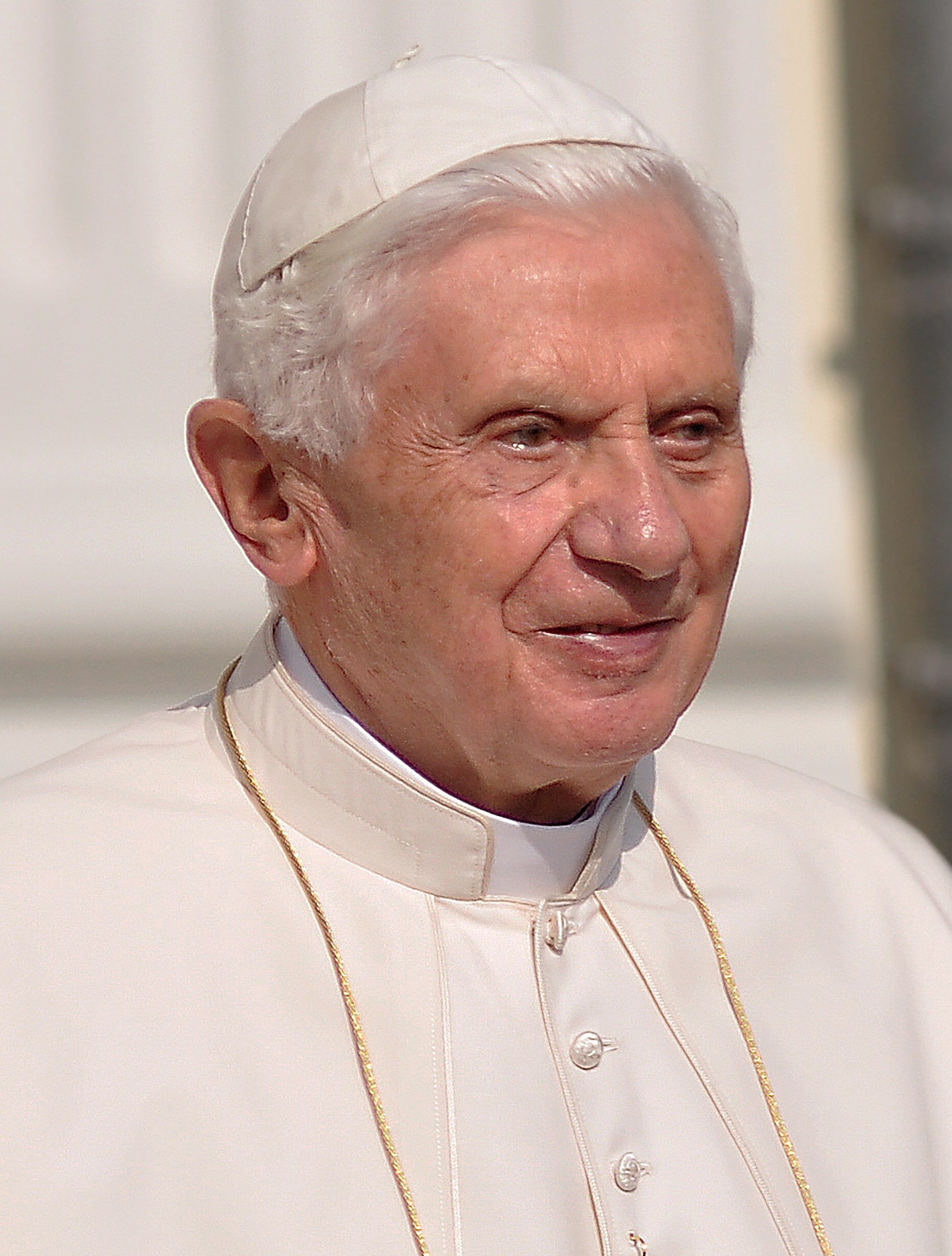
Cardinal Joseph Ratzinger was elected Pope Benedict XVI by the conclave on 19 April 2005.

The papal conclave of 2005 was convened to elect a pope, the leader of the Catholic Church, to succeed John Paul II following his death on 2 April 2005. In accordance with the apostolic constitution Universi Dominici gregis, which governed the vacancy of the Holy See, only cardinals who had not passed their 80th birthday on the day on which the Holy See became vacant (in this case, those who were born on or after 2 April 1925) were eligible to participate in the conclave. Although not a formal requirement, the cardinal electors almost always elect the pope from among their number. The election was carried out by secret ballot (Latin: per scrutinium).

Of the 183 members of the College of Cardinals at the time of John Paul II's death, 117 cardinal electors were eligible to participate in the subsequent conclave. Two cardinal electors did not attend, decreasing the number of participants to 115. The required two-thirds supermajority needed to elect a pope was 77 votes. In the event of a protracted deadlock, only a simple majority of 58 votes was needed.

Of the 115 attending cardinal electors, 5 were cardinal bishops, 93 were cardinal priests, and 17 were cardinal deacons; 2 had been created cardinals by Pope Paul VI and 113 by Pope John Paul II; 24 worked in the service of the Holy See (such as in the Roman Curia), 73 were in pastoral ministry outside Rome, and 18 had retired. The oldest cardinal elector in the conclave was Marco Cé, at the age of 79, and the youngest was Péter Erdő, at the age of 52. Another 66 cardinals were ineligible to participate in the conclave for reasons of age.

The cardinal electors entered the Sistine Chapel to begin the conclave on 18 April 2005. On 19 April, after four ballots over two days, they elected Cardinal Joseph Ratzinger, the dean of the College of Cardinals and prefect of the Congregation for the Doctrine of the Faith, who took the papal name Benedict XVI.

== Cardinal electors ==
The College of Cardinals is divided into three orders – cardinal bishops (CB), cardinal priests (CP), and cardinal deacons (CD) – with formal precedence in that sequence. This determines the order in which the cardinal electors process into the conclave, take the oath, and cast their ballots. For cardinal bishops (except the Eastern Catholic patriarchs), the dean of the College of Cardinals is first in precedence, followed by the vice-dean, and then by the remainder in order of appointment as cardinal bishops. For cardinal bishops who are Eastern Catholic patriarchs, for cardinal priests, and for cardinal deacons, precedence is determined by the date of the consistory in which they were created cardinals and then by the order in which they appeared in the official announcement or bulletin.

Three of the cardinal electors were from the Eastern Catholic Churches: Ignace Moussa I Daoud (Syriac), Varkey Vithayathil (Syro-Malabar), and Lubomyr Husar (Ukrainian). The senior cardinal bishop, the senior cardinal priest, the senior cardinal deacon, and the junior cardinal deacon, who were assigned specific roles in the conclave, such as presiding over the conclave itself (the senior cardinal bishop) or announcing the election of the pope (the senior cardinal deacon), were, respectively, Joseph Ratzinger, William Wakefield Baum, Jorge Arturo Medina Estévez, and Attilio Nicora. The camerlengo of the Holy Roman Church, who was in charge of administering the Holy See during its vacancy, was Eduardo Martínez Somalo.

The data below are as of 2 April 2005, the date on which the Holy See became vacant. All cardinals are of the Latin Church unless otherwise stated. Cardinals belonging to institutes of consecrated life or to societies of apostolic life are indicated by the relevant post-nominal letters.

* Elected pope

Rank	Name	Country	Born	Order	Consistory	Office	Ref.
1	Joseph Ratzinger*	Germany	16 April 1927 (age 77)	CB	27 June 1977; Paul VI	Prefect of the Congregation for the Doctrine of the Faith (Dean)	
2	Angelo Sodano	Italy	23 November 1927 (age 77)	CB	28 June 1991; John Paul II	Secretary of State (Vice-Dean)	
3	Alfonso López Trujillo	Colombia	8 November 1935 (age 69)	CB	2 February 1983; John Paul II	President of the Pontifical Council for the Family	
4	Giovanni Battista Re	Italy	30 January 1934 (age 71)	CB	21 February 2001; John Paul II	Prefect of the Congregation for Bishops	
5	Ignace Moussa I Daoud	Syria	18 September 1930 (age 74)	CB	21 February 2001; John Paul II	Prefect of the Congregation for the Oriental Churches (Syriac Church)	
6	William Wakefield Baum	United States	21 November 1926 (age 78)	CP	24 May 1976; Paul VI	Major Penitentiary emeritus	
7	Marco Cé	Italy	8 July 1925 (age 79)	CP	30 June 1979; John Paul II	Patriarch emeritus of Venice	
8	Franciszek Macharski	Poland	20 May 1927 (age 77)	CP	30 June 1979; John Paul II	Archbishop of Kraków	
9	Michael Michai Kitbunchu	Thailand	25 January 1929 (age 76)	CP	2 February 1983; John Paul II	Archbishop of Bangkok	
10	Godfried Danneels	Belgium	4 June 1933 (age 71)	CP	2 February 1983; John Paul II	Archbishop of Mechelen–Brussels	
11	Thomas Stafford Williams	New Zealand	20 March 1930 (age 75)	CP	2 February 1983; John Paul II	Archbishop emeritus of Wellington	
12	Carlo Maria Martini SJ	Italy	15 February 1927 (age 78)	CP	2 February 1983; John Paul II	Archbishop emeritus of Milan	
13	Jean-Marie Lustiger	France	17 September 1926 (age 78)	CP	2 February 1983; John Paul II	Archbishop emeritus of Paris	
14	Józef Glemp	Poland	18 December 1929 (age 75)	CP	2 February 1983; John Paul II	Archbishop of Warsaw	
15	Joachim Meisner	Germany	25 December 1933 (age 71)	CP	2 February 1983; John Paul II	Archbishop of Cologne	
16	Francis Arinze	Nigeria	1 November 1932 (age 72)	CP	25 May 1985; John Paul II	Prefect of the Congregation for Divine Worship and the Discipline of the Sacraments	
17	Miguel Obando Bravo SDB	Nicaragua	2 February 1926 (age 79)	CP	25 May 1985; John Paul II	Archbishop emeritus of Managua	
18	Ricardo Jamin Vidal	Philippines	6 February 1931 (age 74)	CP	25 May 1985; John Paul II	Archbishop of Cebu	
19	Paul Poupard	France	30 August 1930 (age 74)	CP	25 May 1985; John Paul II	President of the Pontifical Council for Culture	
20	Friedrich Wetter	Germany	20 February 1928 (age 77)	CP	25 May 1985; John Paul II	Archbishop of Munich and Freising	
21	Adrianus Johannes Simonis	Netherlands	26 November 1931 (age 73)	CP	25 May 1985; John Paul II	Archbishop of Utrecht	
22	Bernard Francis Law	United States	4 November 1931 (age 73)	CP	25 May 1985; John Paul II	Archpriest of the Papal Basilica of Saint Mary Major	
23	Giacomo Biffi	Italy	13 June 1928 (age 76)	CP	25 May 1985; John Paul II	Archbishop emeritus of Bologna	
24	Eduardo Martínez Somalo	Spain	31 March 1927 (age 78)	CP	28 June 1988; John Paul II	Prefect emeritus of the Congregation for Institutes of Consecrated Life and Societies of Apostolic Life and Camerlengo of the Holy Roman Church	
25	José Freire Falcão	Brazil	23 October 1925 (age 79)	CP	28 June 1988; John Paul II	Archbishop emeritus of Brasília	
26	Michele Giordano	Italy	22 September 1930 (age 74)	CP	28 June 1988; John Paul II	Archbishop of Naples	
27	Edmund Casimir Szoka	United States	14 September 1927 (age 77)	CP	28 June 1988; John Paul II	President of the Pontifical Commission for Vatican City State	
28	László Paskai OFM	Hungary	8 May 1927 (age 77)	CP	28 June 1988; John Paul II	Archbishop emeritus of Esztergom–Budapest	
29	Christian Wiyghan Tumi	Cameroon	15 October 1930 (age 74)	CP	28 June 1988; John Paul II	Archbishop of Douala	
30	Frédéric Etsou-Nzabi-Bamungwabi CICM	DR Congo	3 December 1930 (age 74)	CP	28 June 1991; John Paul II	Archbishop of Kinshasa	
31	Nicolás de Jesús López Rodríguez	Dominican Republic	31 October 1936 (age 68)	CP	28 June 1991; John Paul II	Archbishop of Santo Domingo	
32	Roger Michael Mahony	United States	27 February 1936 (age 69)	CP	28 June 1991; John Paul II	Archbishop of Los Angeles	
33	Camillo Ruini	Italy	19 February 1931 (age 74)	CP	28 June 1991; John Paul II	Vicar General for Rome and Archpriest of the Papal Basilica of Saint John Lateran	
34	Henri Schwery	Switzerland	14 June 1932 (age 72)	CP	28 June 1991; John Paul II	Bishop emeritus of Sion	
35	Georg Maximilian Sterzinsky	Germany	9 February 1936 (age 69)	CP	28 June 1991; John Paul II	Archbishop of Berlin	
36	Miloslav Vlk	Czech Republic	17 May 1932 (age 72)	CP	26 November 1994; John Paul II	Archbishop of Prague	
37	Peter Seiichi Shirayanagi	Japan	17 June 1928 (age 76)	CP	26 November 1994; John Paul II	Archbishop emeritus of Tokyo	
38	Julius Darmaatmadja SJ	Indonesia	20 December 1934 (age 70)	CP	26 November 1994; John Paul II	Archbishop of Jakarta	
39	Jaime Lucas Ortega y Alamino	Cuba	18 October 1936 (age 68)	CP	26 November 1994; John Paul II	Archbishop of San Cristóbal de la Habana	
40	Emmanuel Wamala	Uganda	15 December 1926 (age 78)	CP	26 November 1994; John Paul II	Archbishop of Kampala	
41	William Henry Keeler	United States	4 March 1931 (age 74)	CP	26 November 1994; John Paul II	Archbishop of Baltimore	
42	Jean-Claude Turcotte	Canada	26 June 1936 (age 68)	CP	26 November 1994; John Paul II	Archbishop of Montreal	
43	Ricardo María Carles Gordó	Spain	24 September 1926 (age 78)	CP	26 November 1994; John Paul II	Archbishop emeritus of Barcelona	
44	Adam Joseph Maida	United States	18 March 1930 (age 75)	CP	26 November 1994; John Paul II	Archbishop of Detroit	
45	Vinko Puljić	Bosnia and Herzegovina	8 September 1945 (age 59)	CP	26 November 1994; John Paul II	Archbishop of Vrhbosna	
46	Armand Gaetan Razafindratandra	Madagascar	7 August 1925 (age 79)	CP	26 November 1994; John Paul II	Archbishop of Antananarivo	
47	Juan Sandoval Íñiguez	Mexico	28 March 1933 (age 72)	CP	26 November 1994; John Paul II	Archbishop of Guadalajara	
48	Salvatore De Giorgi	Italy	6 September 1930 (age 74)	CP	21 February 1998; John Paul II	Archbishop of Palermo	
49	Antonio María Rouco Varela	Spain	20 August 1936 (age 68)	CP	21 February 1998; John Paul II	Archbishop of Madrid	
50	Aloysius Matthew Ambrozic	Canada	27 January 1930 (age 75)	CP	21 February 1998; John Paul II	Archbishop of Toronto	
51	Dionigi Tettamanzi	Italy	14 March 1934 (age 71)	CP	21 February 1998; John Paul II	Archbishop of Milan	
52	Polycarp Pengo	Tanzania	5 August 1944 (age 60)	CP	21 February 1998; John Paul II	Archbishop of Dar-es-Salaam	
53	Christoph Schönborn OP	Austria	22 January 1945 (age 60)	CP	21 February 1998; John Paul II	Archbishop of Vienna	
54	Norberto Rivera Carrera	Mexico	6 June 1942 (age 62)	CP	21 February 1998; John Paul II	Archbishop of Mexico	
55	Francis Eugene George OMI	United States	16 January 1937 (age 68)	CP	21 February 1998; John Paul II	Archbishop of Chicago	
56	Marian Jaworski	Poland (Note: Jaworski's territorial jurisdiction as Archbishop of Lviv was in Ukraine.)	21 August 1926 (age 78)	CP	21 February 1998; John Paul II	Archbishop of Lviv	
57	Jānis Pujats	Latvia	14 November 1930 (age 74)	CP	21 February 1998; John Paul II	Archbishop of Riga	
58	Ivan Dias	India	14 April 1936 (age 68)	CP	21 February 2001; John Paul II	Archbishop of Bombay	
59	Geraldo Majella Agnelo	Brazil	19 October 1933 (age 71)	CP	21 February 2001; John Paul II	Archbishop of São Salvador da Bahia	
60	Pedro Rubiano Sáenz	Colombia	13 September 1932 (age 72)	CP	21 February 2001; John Paul II	Archbishop of Bogotá	
61	Theodore Edgar McCarrick	United States	7 July 1930 (age 74)	CP	21 February 2001; John Paul II	Archbishop of Washington	
62	Desmond Connell	Ireland	24 March 1926 (age 79)	CP	21 February 2001; John Paul II	Archbishop emeritus of Dublin	
63	Audrys Juozas Bačkis	Lithuania	1 February 1937 (age 68)	CP	21 February 2001; John Paul II	Archbishop of Vilnius	
64	Francisco Javier Errázuriz Ossa ISch	Chile	5 September 1933 (age 71)	CP	21 February 2001; John Paul II	Archbishop of Santiago de Chile	
65	Julio Terrazas Sandoval CSsR	Bolivia	7 March 1936 (age 69)	CP	21 February 2001; John Paul II	Archbishop of Santa Cruz de la Sierra	
66	Wilfrid Fox Napier OFM	South Africa	8 March 1941 (age 64)	CP	21 February 2001; John Paul II	Archbishop of Durban	
67	Óscar Andrés Rodríguez Maradiaga SDB	Honduras	29 December 1942 (age 62)	CP	21 February 2001; John Paul II	Archbishop of Tegucigalpa	
68	Bernard Agré	Ivory Coast	2 March 1926 (age 79)	CP	21 February 2001; John Paul II	Archbishop of Abidjan	
69	Juan Luis Cipriani Thorne	Peru	28 December 1943 (age 61)	CP	21 February 2001; John Paul II	Archbishop of Lima	
70	Francisco Álvarez Martínez	Spain	14 July 1925 (age 79)	CP	21 February 2001; John Paul II	Archbishop emeritus of Toledo	
71	Cláudio Hummes OFM	Brazil	8 August 1934 (age 70)	CP	21 February 2001; John Paul II	Archbishop of São Paulo	
72	Varkey Vithayathil CSsR	India	29 May 1927 (age 77)	CP	21 February 2001; John Paul II	Major Archbishop of Ernakulam–Angamaly (Syro-Malabar Church)	
73	Jorge Bergoglio SJ	Argentina	17 December 1936 (age 68)	CP	21 February 2001; John Paul II	Archbishop of Buenos Aires	
74	José da Cruz Policarpo	Portugal	26 February 1936 (age 69)	CP	21 February 2001; John Paul II	Patriarch of Lisbon	
75	Severino Poletto	Italy	18 March 1933 (age 72)	CP	21 February 2001; John Paul II	Archbishop of Turin	
76	Cormac Murphy-O'Connor	United Kingdom	24 August 1932 (age 72)	CP	21 February 2001; John Paul II	Archbishop of Westminster	
77	Edward Michael Egan	United States	2 April 1932 (age 73)	CP	21 February 2001; John Paul II	Archbishop of New York	
78	Lubomyr Husar MSU	Ukraine	26 February 1933 (age 72)	CP	21 February 2001; John Paul II	Major Archbishop of Kyiv–Galicia (Ukrainian Greek Church)	
79	Karl Lehmann	Germany	16 May 1936 (age 68)	CP	21 October 2003; John Paul II	Bishop of Mainz	
80	Angelo Scola	Italy	7 November 1941 (age 63)	CP	21 October 2003; John Paul II	Patriarch of Venice	
81	Anthony Olubunmi Okogie	Nigeria	16 June 1936 (age 68)	CP	21 October 2003; John Paul II	Archbishop of Lagos	
82	Bernard Panafieu	France	26 January 1931 (age 74)	CP	21 October 2003; John Paul II	Archbishop of Marseille	
83	Gabriel Zubeir Wako	Sudan	27 February 1941 (age 64)	CP	21 October 2003; John Paul II	Archbishop of Khartoum	
84	Carlos Amigo Vallejo OFM	Spain	23 August 1934 (age 70)	CP	21 October 2003; John Paul II	Archbishop of Seville	
85	Justin Francis Rigali	United States	19 April 1935 (age 69)	CP	21 October 2003; John Paul II	Archbishop of Philadelphia	
86	Keith Michael Patrick O'Brien	United Kingdom	17 March 1938 (age 67)	CP	21 October 2003; John Paul II	Archbishop of Saint Andrews and Edinburgh	
87	Eusébio Oscar Scheid SCI	Brazil	8 December 1932 (age 72)	CP	21 October 2003; John Paul II	Archbishop of São Sebastião do Rio de Janeiro	
88	Ennio Antonelli	Italy	18 November 1936 (age 68)	CP	21 October 2003; John Paul II	Archbishop of Florence	
89	Tarcisio Bertone SDB	Italy	2 December 1934 (age 70)	CP	21 October 2003; John Paul II	Archbishop of Genoa	
90	Peter Kodwo Appiah Turkson	Ghana	11 October 1948 (age 56)	CP	21 October 2003; John Paul II	Archbishop of Cape Coast	
91	Telesphore Placidus Toppo	India	15 October 1939 (age 65)	CP	21 October 2003; John Paul II	Archbishop of Ranchi	
92	George Pell	Australia	8 June 1941 (age 63)	CP	21 October 2003; John Paul II	Archbishop of Sydney	
93	Josip Bozanić	Croatia	20 March 1949 (age 56)	CP	21 October 2003; John Paul II	Archbishop of Zagreb	
94	Jean-Baptiste Phạm Minh Mẫn	Vietnam	5 March 1934 (age 71)	CP	21 October 2003; John Paul II	Archbishop of Ho Chi Minh City	
95	Rodolfo Quezada Toruño	Guatemala	8 March 1932 (age 73)	CP	21 October 2003; John Paul II	Archbishop of Guatemala	
96	Philippe Barbarin	France	17 October 1950 (age 54)	CP	21 October 2003; John Paul II	Archbishop of Lyon	
97	Péter Erdő	Hungary	25 June 1952 (age 52)	CP	21 October 2003; John Paul II	Archbishop of Esztergom–Budapest	
98	Marc Ouellet PSS	Canada	8 June 1944 (age 60)	CP	21 October 2003; John Paul II	Archbishop of Quebec	
99	Jorge Arturo Medina Estévez	Chile	23 December 1926 (age 78)	CD	21 February 1998; John Paul II	Prefect emeritus of the Congregation for Divine Worship and the Discipline of the Sacraments (Protodeacon)	
100	Darío Castrillón Hoyos	Colombia	4 July 1929 (age 75)	CD	21 February 1998; John Paul II	Prefect of the Congregation for the Clergy and President of the Pontifical Commission Ecclesia Dei	
101	James Francis Stafford	United States	26 July 1932 (age 72)	CD	21 February 1998; John Paul II	Major Penitentiary	
102	Agostino Cacciavillan	Italy	14 August 1926 (age 78)	CD	21 February 2001; John Paul II	President emeritus of the Administration of the Patrimony of the Apostolic See	
103	Sergio Sebastiani	Italy	11 April 1931 (age 73)	CD	21 February 2001; John Paul II	President of the Prefecture for the Economic Affairs of the Holy See	
104	Zenon Grocholewski	Poland	11 October 1939 (age 65)	CD	21 February 2001; John Paul II	Prefect of the Congregation for Catholic Education	
105	José Saraiva Martins CMF	Portugal	6 January 1932 (age 73)	CD	21 February 2001; John Paul II	Prefect of the Congregation for the Causes of Saints	
106	Crescenzio Sepe	Italy	2 June 1943 (age 61)	CD	21 February 2001; John Paul II	Prefect of the Congregation for the Evangelization of Peoples	
107	Mario Francesco Pompedda	Italy	18 April 1929 (age 75)	CD	21 February 2001; John Paul II	Prefect emeritus of the Supreme Tribunal of the Apostolic Signatura	
108	Walter Kasper	Germany	5 March 1933 (age 72)	CD	21 February 2001; John Paul II	President of the Pontifical Council for Promoting Christian Unity	
109	Jean-Louis Tauran	France	5 April 1943 (age 61)	CD	21 October 2003; John Paul II	Archivist and Librarian of the Holy Roman Church	
110	Renato Raffaele Martino	Italy	23 November 1932 (age 72)	CD	21 October 2003; John Paul II	President of the Pontifical Council for Justice and Peace	
111	Francesco Marchisano	Italy	25 June 1929 (age 75)	CD	21 October 2003; John Paul II	Archpriest of the Papal Basilica of Saint Peter and President of the Labour Office of the Apostolic See	
112	Julián Herranz Casado	Spain	31 March 1930 (age 75)	CD	21 October 2003; John Paul II	President of the Pontifical Council for Legislative Texts	
113	Javier Lozano Barragán	Mexico	26 January 1933 (age 72)	CD	21 October 2003; John Paul II	President of the Pontifical Council for the Pastoral Care of Health Care Workers	
114	Stephen Fumio Hamao	Japan	9 March 1930 (age 75)	CD	21 October 2003; John Paul II	President of the Pontifical Council for the Pastoral Care of Migrants and Itinerant People	
115	Attilio Nicora	Italy	16 March 1937 (age 68)	CD	21 October 2003; John Paul II	President of the Administration of the Patrimony of the Apostolic See	

=== Not in attendance ===
Rank	Name	Country	Born	Order	Consistory	Office	Reason for absence	Ref.
1	Jaime Lachica Sin	Philippines	31 August 1928 (age 76)	CP	24 May 1976; Paul VI	Archbishop emeritus of Manila	Health (illness)	
2	Adolfo Antonio Suárez Rivera	Mexico	9 January 1927 (age 78)	CP	26 November 1994; John Paul II	Archbishop emeritus of Monterrey	Health (illness)	

== Cardinal electors by continent and country ==
The 115 attending cardinal electors were from 52 countries on all six inhabited continents. The countries with the greatest number of cardinal electors were Italy (twenty), the United States (eleven), and, jointly, Germany and Spain (six each).

Choropleth map indicating the number of cardinal electors in attendance from each country (unnumbered countries denote one cardinal elector) (Note: This map indicates three cardinal electors from Poland and two cardinal electors from Ukraine, reflecting Marian Jaworski considered to be from Ukraine, rather than from Poland (as in the table). There is also an anachronistic border between South Sudan and Sudan; the indicated area of both countries correctly represents the former territory of Sudan at the time.)

* Continent or country of elected pope

Cardinal electors by continent
Continent	Number	Percentage
Africa	11	9.6%
North America	22	19.1%
South America	12	10.4%
Asia	10	8.7%
Europe*	58	50.4%
Oceania	2	1.7%
Total	115	100.0%

Cardinal electors by country
Country	Continent	Number
Argentina	South America	1
Australia	Oceania	1
Austria	Europe	1
Belgium	Europe	1
Bolivia	South America	1
Bosnia and Herzegovina	Europe	1
Brazil	South America	4
Cameroon	Africa	1
Canada	North America	3
Chile	South America	2
Colombia	South America	3
DR Congo	Africa	1
Croatia	Europe	1
Cuba	North America	1
Czech Republic	Europe	1
Dominican Republic	North America	1
France	Europe	5
Germany*	Europe	6
Ghana	Africa	1
Guatemala	North America	1
Honduras	North America	1
Hungary	Europe	2
India	Asia	3
Indonesia	Asia	1
Ireland	Europe	1
Italy	Europe	20
Ivory Coast	Africa	1
Japan	Asia	2
Latvia	Europe	1
Lithuania	Europe	1
Madagascar	Africa	1
Mexico	North America	3
Netherlands	Europe	1
New Zealand	Oceania	1
Nicaragua	North America	1
Nigeria	Africa	2
Peru	South America	1
Philippines	Asia	1
Poland	Europe	3
Portugal	Europe	2
South Africa	Africa	1
Spain	Europe	6
Sudan	Africa	1
Switzerland	Europe	1
Syria	Asia	1
Tanzania	Africa	1
Thailand	Asia	1
Uganda	Africa	1
Ukraine	Europe	2
United Kingdom	Europe	2
United States	North America	11
Vietnam	Asia	1
Total		115

== See also ==
- Cardinals created by Paul VI
- Cardinals created by John Paul II
- Cardinal electors in the 1978 conclaves
- Cardinal electors in the 2013 conclave
- List of current cardinals
