= Mario Delpini =

Archbishop of Milan since 2017

His Excellency The Most Reverend Mario Delpini
- Archbishop of Milan
- Archbishop Delpini
- Church: Roman Catholic Church
- Archdiocese: Milan
- Metropolis: Milan
- See: Milan
- Appointed: 7 July 2017
- Installed: 9 September 2017
- Predecessor: Angelo Scola
- Previous posts: Auxiliary Bishop of Milan (2007-17); Titular Bishop of Stephaniacum (2007-17); Vicar-General of Milan (2012-17)

Orders
- Ordination: 9 June 1975 by Giovanni Colombo
- Consecration: 13 July 2007 by Dionigi Tettamanzi
- Rank: Archbishop

Personal details
- Born: Mario Enrico Delpini; 29 July 1951 (age 75) Gallarate, Lombardy, Italy
- Education: Università Cattolica del Sacro Cuore
- Motto: Latin: Plena est terra gloria eius (The earth is full of His glory)
- Coat of arms

Styles of Mario Delpini
- Reference style: The Most Reverend
- Spoken style: Your Excellency
- Religious style: Monsignor

Mario Enrico Delpini (born 29 July 1951) is an Italian Roman Catholic prelate who has served as Archbishop of Milan since 2017. He previously served as an auxiliary bishop and as the vicar general of the archdiocese.

== Life ==
Mario Enrico Delpini was born in Gallarate, in the Province of Varese, the son of Antonio and Rosa Caruggi. Delpini grew up in Jerago con Orago and in 1975 was ordained to priesthood. He earned a degree in Italian Literature from the Università Cattolica del Sacro Cuore and a licentiate in Theology. Since 1975, Delpini taught Italian Language in the minor seminary of his native archdiocese and in 1989 he was named as its rector. In 1993, he was named as the dean of the seminary of Venegono Inferiore and in 2000 he became the rector of all seminaries of the Milan archdiocese.

In 2006, Cardinal Dionigi Tettamanzi placed him in charge of one of the archdiocesan zones. On 13 July 2007, Pope Benedict XVI named Delpini as the Titular bishop of Stephaniacum, and Tettamanzi consecrated Delpini as a bishop on the following 23 September. Cardinal Angelo Scola made him as the vicar general of the archdiocese in 2012.

On 7 July 2017, Pope Francis appointed him as the new Archbishop of Milan, where he was installed on 9 September.

On 14 June 2023, he celebrated the state funeral of Silvio Berlusconi in the Cathedral of Milan.

In May 2026, Delpini suppressed the traditional procession for the Corpus Domini solemnity.

Catholic Church titles
Preceded by Angelo Scola	Archbishop of Milan; 9 September 2017 – present	Succeeded by incumbent
