= Oasis International Foundation =

The Oasis International Foundation is an interfaith foundation established in 2004. It was based on an idea of Cardinal Angelo Scola to promote mutual knowledge and understanding between Christians and Muslims, with special focus on the reality of Christian minorities in predominantly Muslim countries. Oasis relies on a network of international contacts. In addition to Cardinal Scola its Promotional Committee includes Patriarch Bechara Boutros al-Rahi (Lebanon), Cardinals Philippe Barbarin (Lyon), Josip Bozanic (Zagreb), Péter Erdő (Budapest), Christoph Schönborn (Vienna), Patriarch Fouad Twal (Jerusalem) and Bishops Camillo Ballin (Kuwait), Mounged El-Hachem (Nuncio in Kuwait), Paul Hinder (Emirates), Jean-Clément Jeanbart (Alep), Maroun Lahham (Tunis), Anthony Lobo (Islamabad), Francisco Javier Martínez (Granada) and Joseph Powathil (Changanacherry). The scientific committee includes Islam experts, philosophers, sociologists, historians and legal experts.

== Resources ==
Oasis is part of the Studium Generale Marcianum, the educational-academic department of the Patriarchate of Venice. Over the years it has developed a variety of resources:

- A journal also called Oasis that is published twice a year in four bilingual editions: Italian-Arabic, English-Arabic, French-Arabic and English-Urdu. In print since 2005, it is available by subscription in Italy but can be purchased in selected bookstores.
- A website which offers weekly Arabic translations of the Pope's catecheses.
- A monthly newsletter
- Two book series, a scientific series and one for the general public, published by Marcianum Press; among the books published: La promessa (The Promise) by Card Jean-Marie Lustiger; Cristiani e musulmani, fratelli davanti a Dio? (Christian and Muslims, Brothers in the Eyes of God?), by Father Christian Van Nispen; and Dove guarda l'Indonesia?. Cristiani e musulmani nel paese del sorriso (Whither Indonesia? Christians and Muslims in the Land of Smiles), by Maria Laura Conte, winner of the 2006 Premio Capri (Capri Prize), in the current affairs section. Meticciato. Convivenza o confusione? (Métissage. Coexistence or confusion?), Paolo Gomarasca, 2009.

== Research areas ==
Oasis’ main areas of research are: cultural and civilisational métissage, a notion that seeks to explain the ongoing process of mixing of cultures and spiritual experiences; the cultural heritage of Eastern Christian minorities; the various grassroots forms of Islam as expressions of a type of religiosity that is truly indispensable to understand Muslim societies, past and present; religious freedom seen from a legal perspective but also as a privileged path to grasp the theoretical connection between truth and freedom. For Oasis, bearing witness is a decisive notion in interfaith dialogue when understood as an adequate means to access the truth.

Oasis is based in Venice and was presented to UNESCO in Paris (2005) and the United Nations (2007). The Centre organises each year a plenary meeting, alternating between Venice (2005, 2007 and 2009) and a location in a predominantly Muslim country, Cairo (2006) and Amman (2008).
