= Carlo Caffarra =

Italian prelate of the Catholic Church

His Eminence Carlo Caffarra
- Cardinal, Archbishop emeritus of Bologna
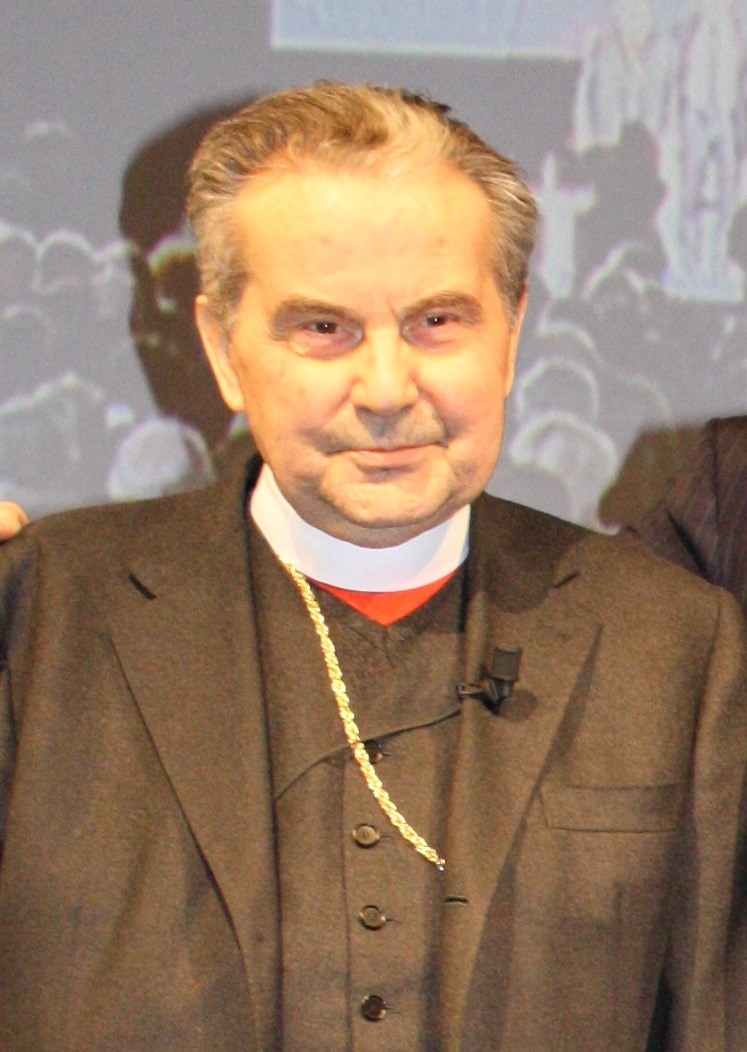
- Province: Bologna
- See: Bologna
- Appointed: 16 December 2003
- Installed: 15 February 2004
- Term ended: 27 October 2015
- Predecessor: Giacomo Biffi
- Successor: Matteo Zuppi
- Other post: Cardinal-Priest of S. Giovanni Battista dei Fiorentini
- Previous posts: Archbishop of Ferrara-Comacchio (1995–2003); President of the Pontifical John Paul II Institute for Studies on Marriage and Family (1981–1995)

Orders
- Ordination: 2 July 1961 by Guglielmo Bosetti
- Consecration: 21 October 1995 by Giacomo Biffi
- Created cardinal: 24 March 2006 by Pope Benedict XVI
- Rank: Cardinal-Priest

Personal details
- Born: Carlo Caffarra; 1 June 1938 Samboseto di Busseto, Italy
- Died: 6 September 2017 (aged 79) Bologna, Italy
- Denomination: Roman Catholic
- Coat of arms

Styles of Carlo Caffarra
- Reference style: His Eminence
- Spoken style: Your Eminence
- Informal style: Cardinal
- See: Bologna

Carlo Caffarra (1 June 1938 – 6 September 2017) was an Italian Catholic prelate who served as Archbishop of Bologna from 2003 until 2015. His previous positions included President of the Pontifical John Paul II Institute for Studies on Marriage and Family from 1981 to 1995 and Archbishop of Ferrara-Comacchio from 1995 to 2003. He was created a cardinal on 24 March 2006 by Pope Benedict XVI.

== Early life ==
Caffarra was born on 1 June 1938 in Samboseto di Busseto, in the province of Parma, Emilia Romagna. He was educated at the Episcopal Seminary of Fidenza and the Pontifical Gregorian University in Rome, where he completed a doctorate in Canon law. He was ordained a priest on 2 July 1961 in Rome.

Beginning in 1965, Caffarra taught moral theology in the seminaries of Fidenza and Parma and later at the Studio Teologico Accademico Bolognese, the Università Cattolica in Milan, and at the Theological Faculty of Northern Italy. His academic specialty was the moral doctrine of marriage and the bioethics of human procreation. He also taught medical ethics in the Faculty of Medicine and Surgery at the Università Cattolica's campus in Rome.

Pope Paul VI named him a member of the International Theological Commission where he served from 1974 to 1984. In 1980, Pope John Paul II named him an expert advisor to the Synod of Bishops on Marriage and the Family. He was the first president of the Pontifical John Paul II Institute for Studies on Marriage and Family from its establishment in 1980, a position he held until 1995, and founded sections of the same institute in the United States, Spain, and Mexico. Pope John Paul II appointed him a consultor to the Congregation for the Doctrine of the Faith in 1983, and he was an advisor to Pope John Paul II on sexual issues.

In the 1980s, Sister Lucia addressed a letter to him in which she predicted "there will come a time when the decisive confrontation between the Kingdom of God and Satan will take place over marriage and the family."

== Bishop ==
Caffarra was named Archbishop of Ferrara-Comacchio on 8 September 1995, and consecrated on 21 October 1995 in the Cathedral of Fidenza by Giacomo Biffi, Archbishop of Bologna. He was installed on 4 November. Caffarra was appointed Archbishop of the Bologna on 16 December 2003, and installed there on 15 February 2004.

Caffarra was a noted opponent of contraception. In 1988, Caffarra weighed the sin of condom use against acquiring the AIDS virus, stating: "Even the smallest moral wrong is so much greater than any physical wrong. I know this is hard for some to accept when the dangers are great, but the Church is here to combat moral wrongs." The next year, Caffarra argued condom campaigns further exposed society to AIDS because "the means of protection are far from reliable".

On 24 August 2005, Caffarra held the central intervention "Freedom as liberation" at the annual Rimini Meeting of Communion and Liberation. Subsequently, he and Marcello Pera presented the Ratzinger's book L'Europa di Benedetto nella crisi delle culture.

== Cardinal ==
In the consistory of 24 March 2006, Pope Benedict XVI named Caffarra Cardinal-Priest of San Giovanni dei Fiorentini. On 7 May 2006, he was made a member of the Congregation for the Evangelization of Peoples and the Executive Committee of the Pontifical Council for the Family. He was identified at the time as "a strong conservative" voice for the opposition of the Catholic Church to the modern world, and one of Benedict XVI's less centrist appointments to the College of Cardinals. In a note he published on 14 February 2010, Caffarra wrote "public officials who openly support same-sex marriage cannot consider themselves to be Catholic". Moreover, he said: "It is impossible for the Catholic faith and support for putting homosexual unions on equal footing with marriage to coexist in one's conscience – the two contradict each other."

Caffarra participated as a cardinal elector in the 2013 conclave that elected Pope Francis. Pope Francis named him to participate in the Synod on the Family in October 2014, in advance of which Caffarra authored an essay that argued that Catholics who divorce and remarry must be denied access to the Eucharist because their situation "is in objective contradiction with that bond of love that unites Christ and the Church, which is signified and actualized by the Eucharist". Allowing them access would mean the Church recognize their extramarital sexual relations as legitimate and contradict Church doctrine on the indissolubility of marriage. When accused of opposing Pope Francis with that essay, he called the statement a "slander" and said he would rather be charged with taking a lover than harboring views not shared by the pope.

On 26 September 2015, Pope Francis appointed Caffarra to a five-year term as a member of the Congregation for the Causes of Saints. His resignation as archbishop was accepted on 27 October 2015. In September 2016, Caffarra and three other cardinals publicly asked Pope Francis to clarify five points of doctrine in the Pope's apostolic exhortation, Amoris laetitia. They issued this public letter after the Pope did not reply to the same query made privately. In June 2017, Caffarra wrote on behalf of the four asking Francis for an audience to discuss their questions. He said that varying interpretations were producing inconsistency, arguing: "What is sin in Poland is good in Germany, that what is prohibited in the Archdiocese of Philadelphia is permitted in Malta."

Catholic Church titles
| New title | President of the Pontifical John Paul II Institute for Studies on Marriage and Family; 1981 – 1995 | Succeeded by Angelo Scola |
| Preceded by (Bishop) Luigi Maverna | Archbishop of Ferrara-Comacchio; 8 September 1995 – 16 December 2003 | Succeeded by Paolo Rabitti |
| Preceded by Giacomo Biffi | Archbishop of Bologna; 16 December 2003 – 27 October 2015 | Succeeded by Matteo Zuppi |
