= Enrico Manfredini =

His Excellency, The Most Reverend Enrico Manfredini
- Archbishop of Bologna
- Native name: Ricu Manfredini
- Church: Catholic Church
- See: Bologna
- Installed: 18 March 1983
- Term ended: 16 December 1983
- Predecessor: Antonio Poma
- Successor: Giacomo Biffi
- Previous post: Bishop of Piacenza (1969-1983)

Orders
- Ordination: 26 May 1945 by Alfredo Ildefonso Schuster
- Consecration: 4 November 1969 by Giovanni Colombo

Personal details
- Born: 20 January 1922 Suzzara, Province of Mantua, Kingdom of Italy
- Died: 16 December 1983 (aged 61) Bologna, Emilia-Romagna, Italy

Enrico Manfredini (20 January 1922 – 16 December 1983) was an Italian Roman Catholic prelate who served as the Archbishop of Bologna from 18 March 1983 until his death in 16 December on the same year.

== Biography ==
He was born in Suzzara, in the province and Diocese of Mantua, on 20 January 1922; he was baptized with the name Ruben Enrico. In 1930, he moved with his family to Milan.

=== Education and Priestly Ministry ===
In 1934, he entered the archiepiscopal minor seminaries, first in Seveso, then in Venegono Inferiore, then the location of the Faculty of Theology. During this period, he met and became a close friend of Don Luigi Giussani, a fellow seminarian and founder of Communion and Liberation.

On 26 May 1945, he was ordained a priest in the cathedral of Milan by Cardinal Alfredo Ildefonso Schuster.

After ordination, he was assigned as vicar in Monza, until 1950, and then in Lambrate.

In 1951, he graduated in philosophy and literature from the Catholic University of the Sacred Heart. From 1950 to 1956, he taught philosophy in the archiepiscopal seminaries of the Archdiocese of Milan. In 1956, he was appointed diocesan assistant to Catholic Action’s youth sector; in 1958, he became diocesan delegate for the entire Italian Catholic Action.

In 1963, he was appointed Provost of the Basilica of San Vittore in Varese by Cardinal Giovanni Battista Montini, who, after being elected Pope Paul VI, chose him as parish priest and helper at the Second Vatican Council.

== Episcopacy ==
In 1969, Pope Paul VI appointed Manfredini as the Bishop of Piacenza, succeeding Archbishop Umberto Malchiodi, who had retired due to age. His episcopal ordination took place on November 4 in the Varese sports hall and was presided over by Cardinal Giovanni Colombo, with Archbishops Umberto Malchiodi and Giuseppe Schiavini assisting. He officially took possession of the diocese at Piacenza Cathedral on December 8. As a sign of humility, he refused to have his own episcopal coat of arms designed, saying instead that he felt represented by the image of a honey-dripping twig attracting a swarm of bees — a design later carved on his gravestone.

Within the Ecclesiastical Conference of Emilia-Romagna, he served as episcopal delegate for the family from 1970 to 1977 and again from 1982 to 1983. From 1977 to 1982, he was delegate for charitable and welfare issues. In the Episcopal Conference of Italy, he was secretary of the Episcopal Commission for the Family from 1973 to 1975, later becoming president from 1982 to 1983. Between 1975 and 1978, he also served as president of the episcopal committee for the Catholic University.

In 1983, Pope John Paul II named him Metropolitan Archbishop of Bologna, succeeding Cardinal Antonio Poma, who had resigned for health reasons. He took canonical possession of the archdiocese on April 30. On June 29, at St. Peter's Basilica, he received the Pallium from Pope John Paul II. During this period, he also continued to act as the Apostolic Administrator of Piacenza until the arrival of his successor, Antonio Mazza, on October 9. On July 9 of that same year, he was elected president of the Episcopal Conference of Emilia-Romagna.

== Death ==
On the night of 15 December 1983, at the age of 61, Manfredini died suddenly in Bologna due to a heart attack — before he could be created a Cardinal, a title traditionally associated with the see of Bologna.

His funeral Mass was celebrated on 19 December by Cardinal Marco Cé in Bologna Cathedral. He was buried in that cathedral, where his tomb bears the inscription: “Worker of the Gospel and of Charity.”
