= Giacomo Biffi =

Catholic cardinal (1928–2015)

His Eminence Giacomo Biffi
- Cardinal, Archbishop of Bologna
- Archdiocese: Bologna
- See: Bologna
- Installed: 19 April 1984
- Term ended: 16 December 2003
- Predecessor: Enrico Manfredini
- Successor: Carlo Caffarra
- Other post: Cardinal-Priest of Santi Giovanni Evangelista e Petronio
- Previous posts: Titular Bishop of Fidenae (1975-1984); Auxiliary Bishop of Milan (1975-1984)

Orders
- Ordination: 23 December 1950 by Alfredo Ildefonso Schuster, O.S.B.
- Consecration: 11 January 1976 by Giovanni Colombo
- Created cardinal: 25 May 1985 by Pope John Paul II
- Rank: Cardinal-Priest

Personal details
- Born: Giacomo Biffi; 13 June 1928 Milan, Italy
- Died: 11 July 2015 (aged 87) Bologna, Italy
- Denomination: Roman Catholic
- Motto: Ubi Fides Ibi Libertas
- Coat of arms: Giacomo Biffi's coat of arms

Styles of Giacomo Biffi
- Reference style: His Eminence
- Spoken style: Your Eminence
- Informal style: Cardinal
- See: Bologna (Emeritus)

Giacomo Biffi (13 June 1928 – 11 July 2015) was an Italian Cardinal of the Roman Catholic Church. He was Archbishop Emeritus of Bologna, having served as archbishop there from 1984 to 2003. He was elevated to the cardinalate in 1985.

== Biography ==
Biffi was born in Milan on 13 June 1928 and studied at the seminaries of the Archdiocese of Milan. He was ordained to the priesthood by Cardinal Alfredo Ildefonso Schuster, Archbishop of Milan, on 23 December 1950. From 1951 to 1960, Biffi taught dogmatic theology at the Seminary of Milan, publishing numerous works on theology, catechetics, and meditation. He received a doctorate in theology from the Faculty of Theology at Venegono in 1955; his thesis examined the questions of guilt and freedom in modern life.

From 1960 to 1975, he did pastoral work in the Archdiocese of Milan, serving as a parish priest at Santi Martiri Anauniani in Legnano (1960–1969) and later at Sant'Andrea in Milan (1969–1975). Biffi became Episcopal Vicar for Culture in 1974, and a canon theologian of the metropolitan chapter of Milan on 1 February 1975. He also served as director of the Istituto Lombardo di Pastorale and the Commission for the Ambrosian Rite.

On 7 December 1975, Biffi was appointed Auxiliary Bishop of Milan and Titular Bishop of Fidenae by Pope Paul VI. He received his episcopal consecration on 11 January 1976 from Cardinal Giovanni Colombo, with Bishops Bernardo Citterio and Libero Tresoldi serving as co-consecrators. Within the Italian Episcopal Conference, he served on commissions for doctrine, catechetics, culture and liturgy.

Following the death of Enrico Manfredini, Biffi was named Archbishop of Bologna on 19 April 1984 and installed on the following 1 June. He was elected President of the Episcopal Conference of Emilia-Romagna on 7 July 1984. Pope John Paul II created him Cardinal-Priest of Santi Giovanni Evangelista e Petronio in the consistory of 25 May 1985. Biffi preached the Lent spiritual exercises for the pope and Roman Curia in 1989. He retired from the governance of the archdiocese in December 2003 and was succeeded by Carlo Caffarra.

Biffi was one of the cardinal electors who participated in the 2005 conclave that selected Pope Benedict XVI.. He consistently received one vote in each ballot of that conclave. He reportedly told a fellow cardinal that, if he found out who this one voter was, he would slap him. Shocked, the cardinal told Biffi that the one voter was Cardinal Ratzinger, who would be elected pope on the next ballot.

In 2008, Biffi turned 80 and lost the right to participate in conclaves. He died on 11 July 2015.

== Views ==
In 2000, Biffi told a Bologna conference that the Antichrist would most likely be a prominent philanthropist promoting the ideas of ecumenism, vegetarianism, and pacifism. Many of these predictions originate from the 19th century Russian philosopher Vladimir Solovyov, in whom Biffi is well-studied. Biffi believed that ecumenicism promotes the dilution of Catholic doctrine (a view common among conservative Catholics) and thereby encourages the acceptance of the Antichrist.

Biffi held conservative social views, stating that an "ideology of homosexuality" threatens to marginalize whoever disagrees with the "homosexual agenda", and that Catholics must prepare for persecution by homosexual activists and their allies. Cardinal Biffi also once said that the Italian government should favour Catholic immigrants to offset the number of Muslim immigrants to protect Italy's "national identity". He denounced journalists as "rats".

In 2007, Biffi published Memorie e digressioni di un italiano cardinale (Memoirs and Digressions of An Italian Cardinal). In the memoir, Biffi questioned the choice of Nagasaki, with its history of persecution of Catholics, being chosen as a target for the second atomic bomb.

Catholic Church titles
| Preceded by Enrico Manfredini | Archbishop of Bologna; 19 April 1984 – 16 December 2003 | Succeeded by Carlo Caffarra |
