= San Luca a Via Prenestina =

- Church of Saint Luke on the Praenestine Way; S. Lucæ ad viam Prænetinam (in Latin)
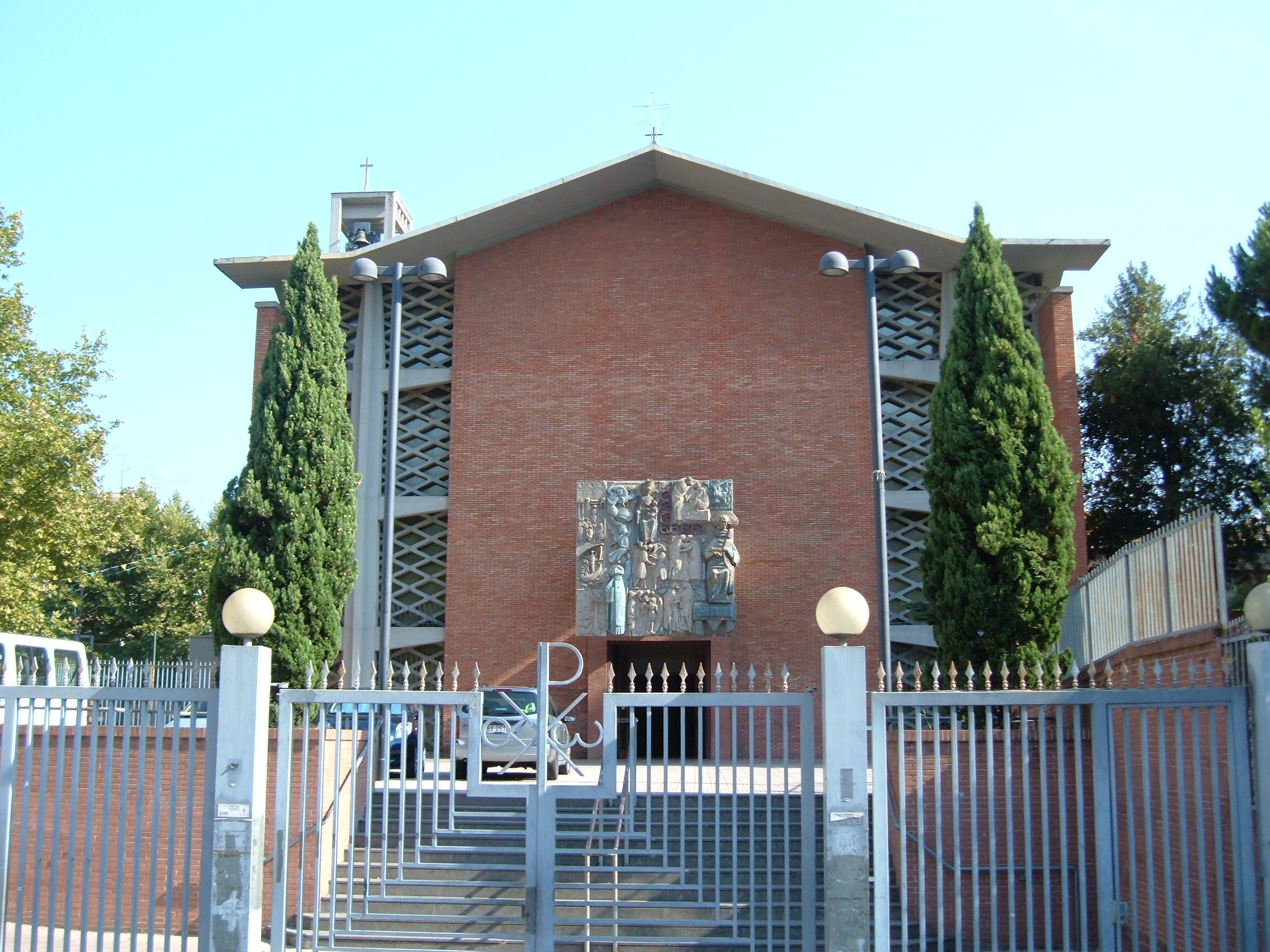
- Facade
- Click on the map for a fullscreen view
- 41°53′18″N 12°32′15″E
- Location: Via Luchino dal Verme 50, Rome
- Country: Italy
- Denomination: Roman Catholic
- Tradition: Roman Rite
- Website: sanlucaroma.it

History
- Status: Titular church
- Dedication: Luke the Evangelist
- Consecrated: 1957; 69 years ago

Architecture
- Architect(s): Lucio and Vincenzo Passarelli
- Architectural type: Church
- Style: Modern
- Groundbreaking: 1955
- Completed: 1958

Administration
- District: Lazio
- Province: Rome

The church of St. Luke the Evangelist is a church of Rome in Prenestino-Labicano district, in Largo San Luca Evangelista (via Roberto Malatesta).

== History ==
It was built between 1955 and 1958 to a design by architects Lucio and Vincenzo Passarelli, and solemnly inaugurated by Monsignor Luigi Traglia on June 20, 1957

The church is home parish, erected January 2, 1956 with the decree of the Cardinal Vicar Clemente Micara Neminem sane latet. It is also home to the cardinal's title of "San Luca Via Prenestina", founded by Pope Paul VI April 29, 1969.

The church was visited by Pope John Paul II November 4, 1979.

== List of Cardinal Protectors ==
- Antonio Poma 30 April 1969 – 24 September 1985
- José Freire Falcão 28 June 1988 – 26 September 2021
- Luis José Rueda Aparicio 30 September 2023
