= 2005 conclave =

Election of Catholic Pope Benedict XVI

Papal conclave April 2005

Dates and location
- 18–19 April 2005; Sistine Chapel, Apostolic Palace, Vatican City

Key officials
- Dean: Joseph Ratzinger
- Sub-dean: Angelo Sodano
- Camerlengo: Eduardo Martínez Somalo
- Protopriest: Stephen Kim Sou-hwan
- Protodeacon: Jorge Medina
- Secretary: Francesco Monterisi

Election
- Electors: 115 (list)
- Candidates: See papabili
- Ballots: 4

Elected pope
- Joseph Ratzinger; Name taken: Benedict XVI
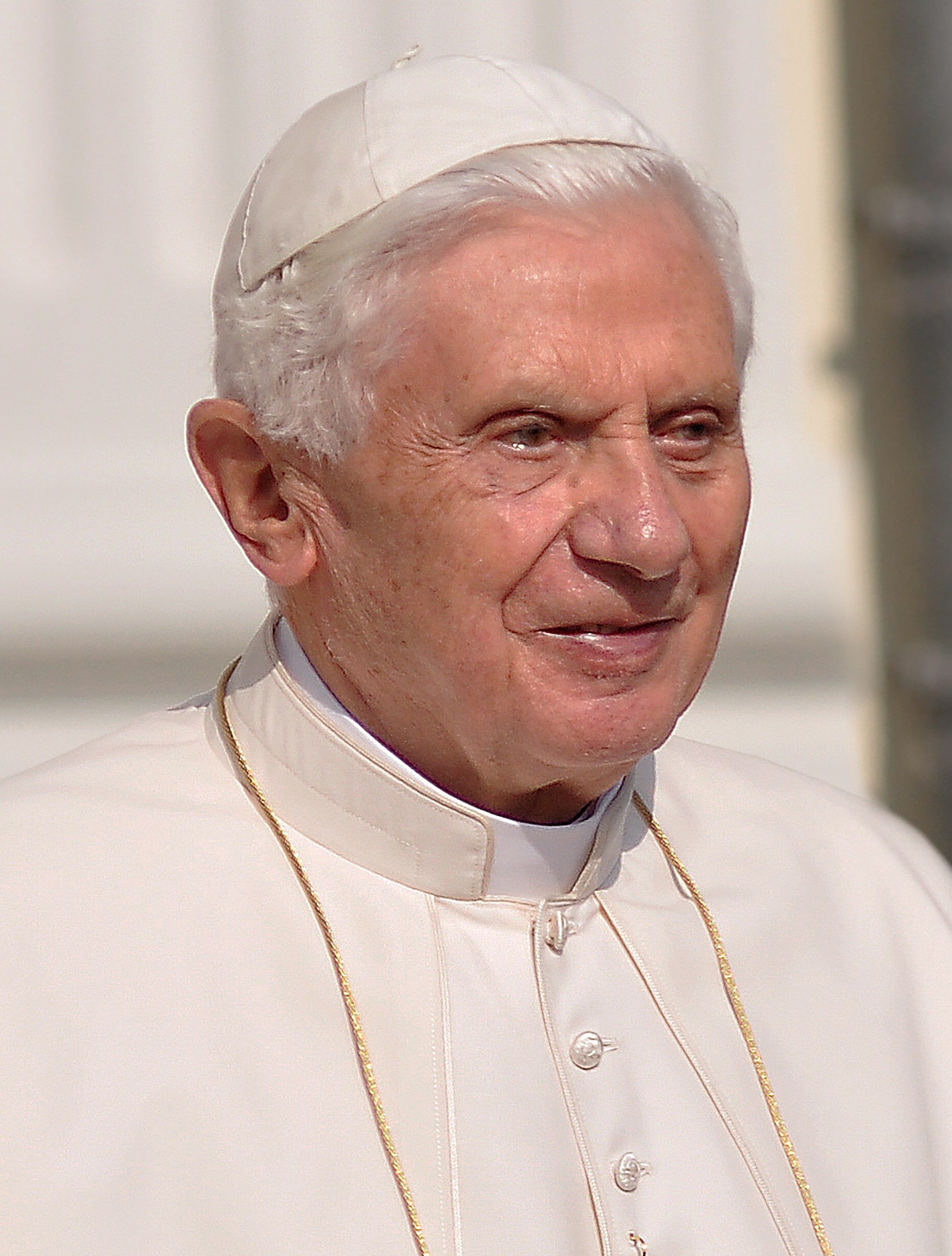

A conclave was held on 18 and 19 April 2005 to elect a new pope to succeed John Paul II, who had died on 2 April 2005. Of the 117 eligible cardinal electors, all but two attended. On the fourth ballot, the conclave elected Cardinal Joseph Ratzinger, the dean of the College of Cardinals and prefect of the Congregation for the Doctrine of the Faith. After accepting his election, he took the name Benedict XVI. Ratzinger was the first cardinal from the Roman Curia to become pope since Pius XII in 1939.

== Papal election process ==
The papal election process began soon after the death of Pope John Paul II on 2 April 2005.

=== New voting procedures ===
Pope John Paul II laid out new procedures for the election of his successor in his 1996 apostolic constitution Universi Dominici gregis. It detailed the roles of the cardinals and the support personnel, the scheduling of the conclave, the text of the oaths, the penalties for violating secrecy, and many details, including the shape of the ballots ("the ballot paper must be rectangular in shape"). He denied the cardinal electors the right to choose a pope by acclamation or by assigning the election to a select group of cardinals (by compromise). He also established new voting procedures that the cardinals could follow if the balloting continued for several days, but those were not invoked in this conclave. He maintained the rule established by Paul VI that cardinals who reached the age of eighty before the day the pope died would not participate in the balloting.

In previous conclaves, the cardinal electors lived in the Sistine Chapel precincts throughout the balloting. Conditions were spartan and difficult for the cardinals with health problems. Showers and bathroom facilities were shared and sleeping areas separated by curtains. John Paul kept the voting in the Sistine Chapel, but provided for the cardinal electors when not balloting to live, dine, and sleep in air-conditioned individual rooms in Domus Sanctae Marthae, better known by its Italian name Casa Santa Marta, a five-story building that was completed in 1996, that normally serves as a guesthouse for visiting clergy.

The cardinals departed from his instructions only in that they did not assemble in the Pauline Chapel. Restoration work begun in 2002 required a change of venue, and they used the Hall of Blessings instead.

=== Cardinal electors ===
Cardinal electors by region
Graphic with the numbers of cardinal electors in attendance from each region
Region	Number
Italy	20
Rest of Europe	38
North America	22
South America	12
Asia	10
Oceania	2
Africa	11
Total	115

Although there were 183 cardinals in total, cardinals aged 80 years or more at the time the papacy became vacant were ineligible to vote in the conclave, according to the rules established by Pope Paul VI in 1970 and modified slightly in 1996 by Pope John Paul II. At the time of Pope John Paul's death, there were 117 cardinals under the age of 80. (Note: John Paul II had appointed one cardinal secretly (in pectore) in 2003, but never revealed that person's identity.)

The cardinal electors came from slightly over fifty nations, a slight increase from the 49 represented at the 1978 conclave. About 30 of those countries had a single participant. The Italian electors were the most numerous with 20, while the United States had the second largest group with 11. Poor health prevented two of the 117 cardinal electors from attending: Jaime Sin of the Philippines and Adolfo Antonio Suárez Rivera of Mexico. (Note: Some reports said Cardinal Sin had hoped for medical clearance to travel. He died in June.) All the electors were appointed by Pope John Paul II, except for three: Jaime Sin, who was not attending, William Wakefield Baum, and Joseph Ratzinger, making Baum and Ratzinger the only participants with previous conclave experience from the two conclaves of 1978. (Note: The 1903 conclave had only one elector with previous conclave experience and the 1823 conclave only two, a function of the age at which cardinals are appointed and the length of a pontificate. The 1878 conclave had three cardinals who had participated in the 1846 conclave.) With 115 cardinal electors participating, this conclave saw the largest number of cardinal electors ever to elect a pope, a number later matched by the 2013 conclave and surpassed in the 2025 conclave. Both conclaves in 1978 had 111 electors. The required two-thirds majority needed to elect a pope in 2005 was 77 votes.

== Papabili ==
Although the conclave cardinals may elect any baptized Catholic male, the last time a non-cardinal was elected pope was in the 1378 conclave. Observers of papal elections tend to consider, by a variety of criteria, some cardinals to be more likely to become pope than the others – these are the papabili, the plural for papabile, an Italian word loosely translated as "pope-able". Since the set of papabili is a matter of speculation from the press, the election of a non-papabile is not uncommon; recent cases are John XXIII in 1958, and both John Paul I and John Paul II in 1978.

On 2 January 2005, Time magazine, quoting unnamed Vatican sources, stated that Cardinal Joseph Ratzinger, the dean of the College of Cardinals, was a frontrunner to succeed Pope John Paul II if the pope died or became too ill to continue as pope. On 2 April 2005, upon the death of John Paul II, the Financial Times gave the odds of Ratzinger getting elected pope as 7–1, the lead position but close to his liberal rivals. On 18 April 2005, the beginning of the conclave, he was identified as one of the 100 most influential people in the world by Time. In addition, Cardinal Jorge Mario Bergoglio, the archbishop of Buenos Aires, who would later become Pope Francis in the 2013 conclave, was also considered to be a papabile. Other papabili included cardinals Francis Arinze, Audrys Backis, Tarcisio Bertone, Godfried Danneels, Ivan Dias, Claudio Hummes, Lubomyr Husar, Marc Ouellet, Giovanni Battista Re, Óscar Rodríguez Maradiaga, Camillo Ruini, Christoph Schönborn, Angelo Scola, and Dionigi Tettamanzi.

== Pre-conclave events ==
In the nine-day period of mourning following the funeral services for Pope John Paul II, the cardinals attended a Mass celebrated each day by a senior cleric, often a cardinal elector or a papabile, who had the opportunity to preach a homily. Celebrants included Bernard Law, Camillo Ruini, Jorge Medina, Eugênio de Araújo Sales, Nasrallah Pierre Sfeir, Leonardo Sandri, and Piergiorgio Silvano Nesti.

On Saturday, 9 April, in Rome, 130 cardinals, including some non-voting cardinals, met in the general congregation and agreed to Ratzinger's proposal that, while it would be unfair for a majority to restrict anyone's right to speak to the press, they might agree to such a restriction unanimously. In La Repubblica, veteran journalist Gad Lerner wrote that preventing "public reflection" by the cardinals "mutes their relationship to the world", deprives them of a "beneficial antidote to excessive scheming", and increased the influence of the Curia. He cited "the fertility of ideas" generated by public discussion during the two 1978 conclaves.

Presiding over the pre-conclave events was the dean of the College of Cardinals, Cardinal Ratzinger. For the first several days, the discussions were conducted largely in Italian, putting some cardinals at a disadvantage. Ratzinger responded to complaints by organizing simultaneous translation. On 14 April, in one of the daily general congregations, they heard the first of two mandated exhortations. The preacher was Raniero Cantalamessa, a Capuchin friar and church history scholar, who had for several years preached the Lenten sermons to the pope and his staff.

On 15 April, officials and personnel who were not cardinal electors but had duties during the conclave formally took their oath of secrecy. Their oath bound them to secrecy about anything they would observe in the course of their duties throughout the papal conclave, under pain of punishment at the discretion of the incoming pope. The oath was administered in the Hall of Blessings in the presence of Camerlengo Eduardo Martínez Somalo and two masters of ceremonies.

One round of balloting was to be held the first evening. The balloting would then continue until a new pope was elected, with two ballots each morning and two each afternoon. The traditional procedure is that the ballots are burned, in times past reinforced by adding handfuls of dry or damp straw, to produce white smoke for a conclusive vote or black smoke for an inconclusive one. The straw had been replaced by chemically produced smoke. The ballot slips were to be burned at 12:00 and 19:00, Rome time (10:00 and 17:00 UTC) each day.

== Conclave ==
=== Day one ===
On 18 April, the cardinals assembled in St. Peter's Basilica in the morning to concelebrate the Mass pro eligendo Romano Pontifice (lit. 'for the election of the Roman Pontiff'). As the dean of the College of Cardinals, Joseph Ratzinger was the principal concelebrant and gave the homily himself. In the afternoon, the cardinal electors assembled in the Hall of Blessings for the procession to the Sistine Chapel. The cardinal electors proceeded to the Sistine Chapel while the Litany of Saints was chanted. After taking their places, the Veni Creator Spiritus ("Come, Creator Spirit") was sung. Cardinal Ratzinger read the oath. Each cardinal elector, beginning with Ratzinger and followed by Vice Dean Angelo Sodano and the other cardinals in order of seniority, affirmed the oath by placing his hands on the book of the Gospels saying aloud: "And I, [name], do so promise, pledge, and swear. So help me God and these Holy Gospels, which I touch with my hand."

Archbishop Piero Marini, the papal master of ceremonies, intoned the words Extra omnes ("Everybody out!"), and the members of the choir, security guards, and others left the chapel. The doors of the chapel were then closed. Cardinal Tomáš Špidlík, a non-elector and a Jesuit theologian, delivered the second required exhortation. He and Marini then left.

==== First ballot ====
According to the Italian daily Il Messaggero, Carlo Maria Martini, the archbishop of Milan, obtained 40 votes on the first ballot, Ratzinger obtained 38 votes, and Camillo Ruini a substantial number of votes, the rest of the votes being dispersed. An anonymous cardinal provided his diary to an Italian journalist in September 2005, and it was published in full in 2011. That source gave the results of the first ballot as:

Cardinals	Votes
Joseph Ratzinger	47
Jorge Bergoglio	10
Carlo Maria Martini	9
Camillo Ruini	6
Angelo Sodano	4
Oscar Maradiaga	3
Dionigi Tettamanzi	2
Giacomo Biffi	1
Others	33

At 20:05 CEST, a thin white plume of smoke seemed for a moment to indicate the election was already over, and the 40,000 people who had spent the afternoon watching the ceremonies on large screens in St. Peter's Square broke into applause and song. But the smoke quickly grew stronger and clearly dark. The crowd quieted and cleared in a matter of minutes.

=== Day two ===
==== Second ballot ====
The two ballots on the morning of the second day failed to result in an election. The results of the second ballot, according to the anonymous cardinal's diary, were:

Cardinals	Votes
Joseph Ratzinger	65
Jorge Bergoglio	35
Angelo Sodano	4
Dionigi Tettamanzi	2
Giacomo Biffi	1
Others	8

==== Third ballot ====
The results of the third ballot, according to the anonymous cardinal's diary, were: (Note: According to Italian newspapers, Ratzinger had reached or exceeded the required 77 votes on the third ballot, but asked for a vote of confirmation in the afternoon. One account of the election of John Paul I says he did this in 1978. According to some interpretations this would not be in conformity with the laws governing the conclave.)

Cardinals	Votes
Joseph Ratzinger	72
Jorge Bergoglio	40
Giacomo Biffi	1
Darío Castrillón Hoyos	1
Others	1

Tens of thousands of people waiting in St Peter's Square reacted with timid applause and then silence a little before noon when smoke of indeterminate color appeared and the lack of bell-ringing indicated that the morning's ballotting was inconclusive. Press speculation held that "A pope who was elected tonight at the fourth-fifth ballot or tomorrow morning at the sixth-seventh would still be a pontiff elected promptly. Beyond that perhaps some problems might arise."

Cardinal Biffi consistently received one vote in each ballot of the conclave. He reportedly told a fellow cardinal that, if he found out who this one voter was, he would slap him. Shocked, the cardinal told Biffi that the one voter was Cardinal Ratzinger, who would be elected pope on the next ballot.

By this point, Cardinal Ratzinger had emerged as a strong contender for the papacy and recounted in an April 2005 audience to German pilgrims that he felt as though he was beneath the metaphorical axe of papal election, and his head began to spin. However, a fellow cardinal, later revealed to be Christoph Schönborn, encouraged Ratzinger, reminding him of his quotation of the Calling of Matthew in his funeral homily for John Paul II and applying it to Ratzinger.

Initially, at the conclave, "[the question] was, if not Ratzinger, who? And as they came to know him, the question became, why not Ratzinger?"

==== Fourth ballot ====
The results of the fourth ballot, according to the anonymous cardinal's diary, were:

Cardinals	Votes
Joseph Ratzinger	84
Jorge Bergoglio	26
Bernard Law	2
Giacomo Biffi	1
Christoph Schönborn	1
Others	2

Given that Ratzinger, the dean of the College of Cardinals, was elected pope, Angelo Sodano as the vice-dean performed the dean's role and asked Ratzinger whether he would accept the election and what name he would adopt.

As the voting slips and notes were burnt after that ballot, "All of a sudden, the whole Sistine Chapel was filled with smoke," according to Adrianus Johannes Simonis. Christoph Schönborn joked: "Fortunately, there were no art historians present."

At 17:50 CEST (15:50 UTC), white smoke rose above the Sistine Chapel. The bells of St. Peter's pealed at about 18:10 CEST.

At 18:43 CEST (16:43 UTC), Cardinal Protodeacon Jorge Medina, emerged on the balcony of St. Peter's Basilica to announce the election of Cardinal Joseph Ratzinger, who took the name Benedict XVI.
