= Roman Catholic Diocese of Luni =

Roman Catholic titular see

Diocese of Luni Dioecesis Lunensis

Location
- Country: Italy

Information
- Denomination: Catholicism
- Sui iuris church: Latin Church
- Established: 1975
- Dissolved: 1975
- Archdiocese: Genoa

The Diocese of Luni was a Roman Catholic bishopric with its seat in Luni, Liguria, northwestern Italy. The bishop and cathedral chapter moved to Sarzana in the 12th century; the move was formalised in 1201. Though the bishops of Luni had been resident at Sarzana long before the official transfer of the cathedral, the diocese and bishop continued to use the name of Luni in their titles down to 1465, when the name of Sarzana was added to both.

The name of the former diocese was revived in 1976 to designate a titular see.

== See also ==
- Roman Catholic Diocese of La Spezia-Sarzana-Brugnato (for history of the Diocese of Luni)

== Bishops ==
=== Diocesan Bishops ===
List of Diocesan Bishops of Luni (until 1975)

=== Titular Bishops ===
- Vincenzo Zarri (1976-1988), later Bishop of Forlì-Bertinoro
- Ján Sokol (1988-1989), later Archbishop of Trnava
- Edward Nowak (1990-present)

== Bibliography ==
- Cappelletti, Giuseppe (1857). Le chiese d'Italia della loro origine sino ai nostri giorni (in Italian). Vol. decimoterzo (13). Venezia: Giuseppe Antonelli. pp. 422–486.
- Eubel, Conradus, ed. (1913). Hierarchia catholica, Tomus 1 (second ed.). Münster: Libreria Regensbergiana. (in Latin)
- Gams, Pius Bonifatius (1873). Series episcoporum Ecclesiae catholicae: quotquot innotuerunt a beato Petro apostolo. Ratisbon: Typis et Sumptibus Georgii Josephi Manz. pp. 817–818. (use with caution; obsolete)
- Gentile, Michele Lupo (1912). Il Regesto del Codice Pelavicino in: Atti della Società ligure di storia patria, Vol. XLIV (Genova, 1912).
- Kehr, Paul Fridolin (1914). Italia pontificia : sive, Repertorium privilegiorum et litterarum a romanis pontificibus ante annum 1598 Italiae ecclesiis, monasteriis, civitatibus singulisque personis concessorum. Vol. VI. pars ii. Berolini: Weidmann. pp. 373–392. (in Latin)
- Semeria, Giovanni Battista (1843). Secoli cristiani della Liguria, ossia, Storia della metropolitana di Genova, delle diocesi di Sarzana, di Brugnato, Savona, Noli, Albegna e Ventimiglia (in Italian). Vol. I. Torino: Tip. Chirio e Mina. Semeria, Giovanni Battista (1843). Volume II. [II, pp. 2–156; 156–159; 159–184]
- Ughelli, Ferdinando (1717). Niccolò Coleti (ed.). Italia sacra sive De episcopis Italiæ, et insularum adjacentium (in Latin) (nova ed.). apud Sebastianum Coleti. pp. 833–856. [Luni and Sarzana]
