= Studium Generale Marcianum =

The Studium Generale Marcianum was a complex of educational institutions established in Venice in 2004 by the Patriarchate of Venice to provide educational services at all levels from secondary school through post-graduate programs, including a faculty of theology, as well as research services and cultural programming in the manner of an interdisciplinary research institution. The Marcianum Foundation (Fondazione Studium Generale Marcianum, in breve Fondazione Marcianum) was founded in 2008 to support these programs and such ancillary projects as facilities management and library services.

The Marcianum was largely dismantled in 2014 when its finances proved an impossible burden for the Church in Venice to support.

== History ==
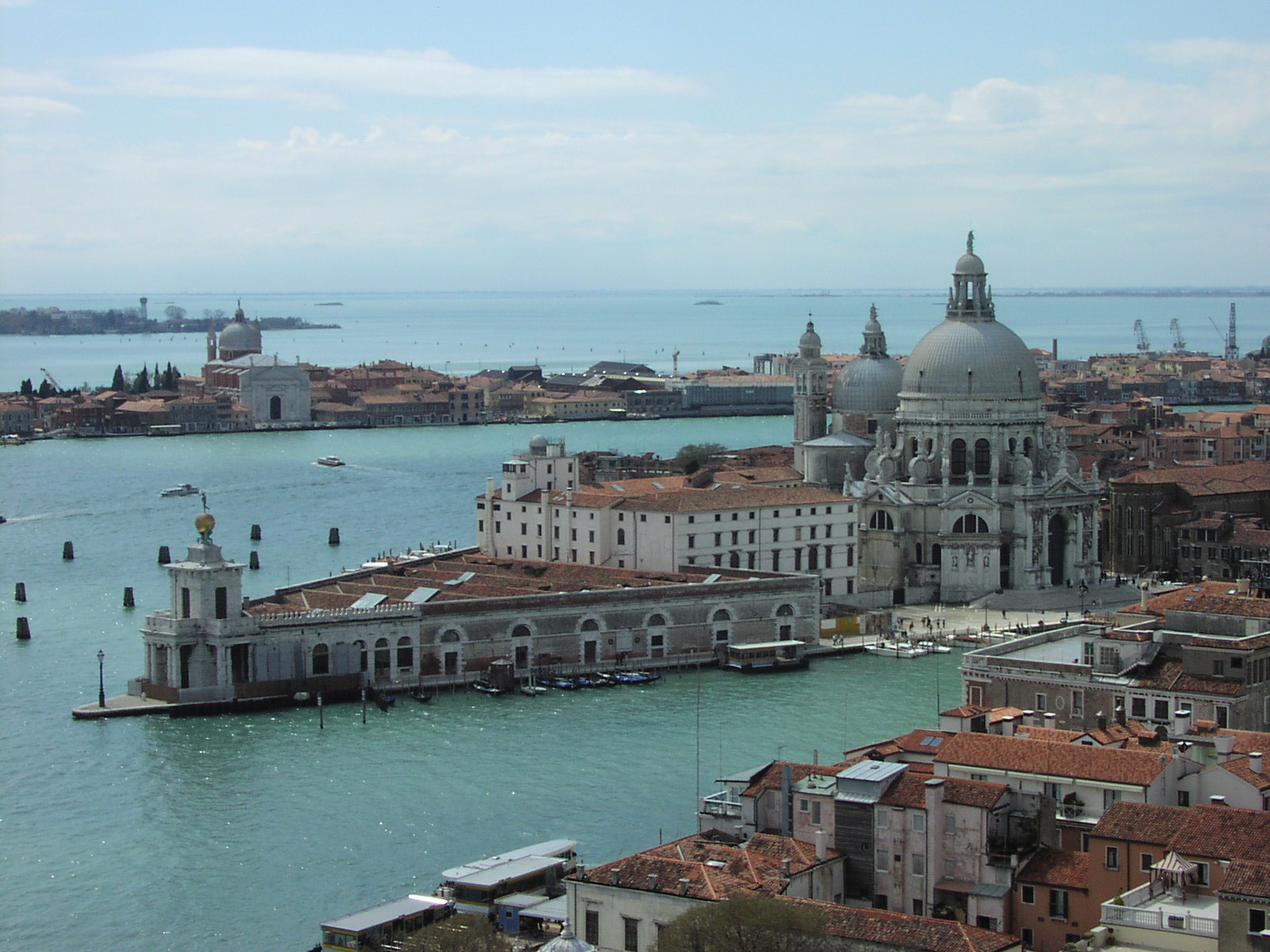
The Punta della Dogana and Basilica of Santa Maria della Salute. On the left of the Basilica, the building of the seminary, where the Studium Generale Marcianum has its headquarters.

Cardinal Angelo Scola, who had been appointed Patriarch of Venice in 2002 and been made a cardinal in October 2003, was the driving force behind the creation of the Marcianum. It was inaugurated on 24 April 2004 by Cardinal Angelo Sodano, Secretary of State of the Holy See, as the envoy of Pope John Paul II on this occasion. He particularly praised the creation of a faculty of canon law which he hoped would prove the "gem" of this "pedagogical-university complex". The pope had sent a message to Scola that underlined the importance of that faculty as well. Sandro Magister wrote of the center: "It has no equal in the world." He credited Scola's experience as an educator for conceiving it, praised its "the seamlessness of the educational system", and its mission as a bridge between civilizations.

Pope Benedict XVI visited the Marcianum library in May 2011 as part of a two-day trip to Venice.

Over the years the Marcianum required financial support from private entities, and this produced a crisis when, in June 2014, a widespread scandal involving financial irregularities and bribery related to the MOSE hydraulic project involved one of the Marcianum's principal sponsors. The new patriarch, Francesco Moraglia, who had succeeded Scola in 2012, used the occasion to review the Marcianum anew in light of the pressures it placed on Church finances and the way corporate support placed inevitable restraints on its freedom. In July he announced the entire complex would be dismantled, with provision made for students who needed to complete their degree programs and for the needs of displaced employees. He took this action after Scola declined to provide financial support and having coordinated his decision with officials of the Roman Curia and informed Pope Francis.

The Faculty of Canon Law St. Pius X, which actually opened in October 2003 in advance of the inauguration of the Marcianum, has operated since 2014 with financial support and cooperation from the dioceses of the Triveneto region.

The Marcianum Foundation continues to provide for cultural and scholarly programs devoted to the religious and cultural heritage of Venice. Over time it has come to focus on "deepening and enhancing the rich teaching of the Church's social doctrine".

Scola believes his enterprise had great significance and might have thrived if he had put the right longterm leader in place, someone not entirely dependent upon the patriarch. He considers the Faculty of Canon Law important because it is the only one in northern Italy.

== Participating entities ==
At its founding in 2004, its constituent bodies were:

- Giovanni Paolo I Foundation
  - continues its work in child education as before the formation of the Marcianum
- Faculty of Canon Law San Pio X
- Institute of Advanced Studies in Religious Sciences "S. Lorenzo Giustiniani"
- MEGA University Master in Ethical Business Management (in collaborazione con Università Ca Foscari e la Scuola di Direzione Aziendale L. Bocconi di Milano)
- ASSET (School for Advanced Studies Society Economy Theology- Studies on the plural society)
- Oasis International Foundation
  - no longer associated with Marcianum, moved to Milan and continues to publish the journal Oasis
- Studium Cattolico Veneziano
- Marcianum Press
  - sold to Edizioni Studium of Rome on 15 December 2015
- International Boarding School Giovanni XXIII
