= Ereré =

Municipality in Ceará, Brazil

Coordinates: 6.03194°S 38.3489°W

Ererê
- Municipality
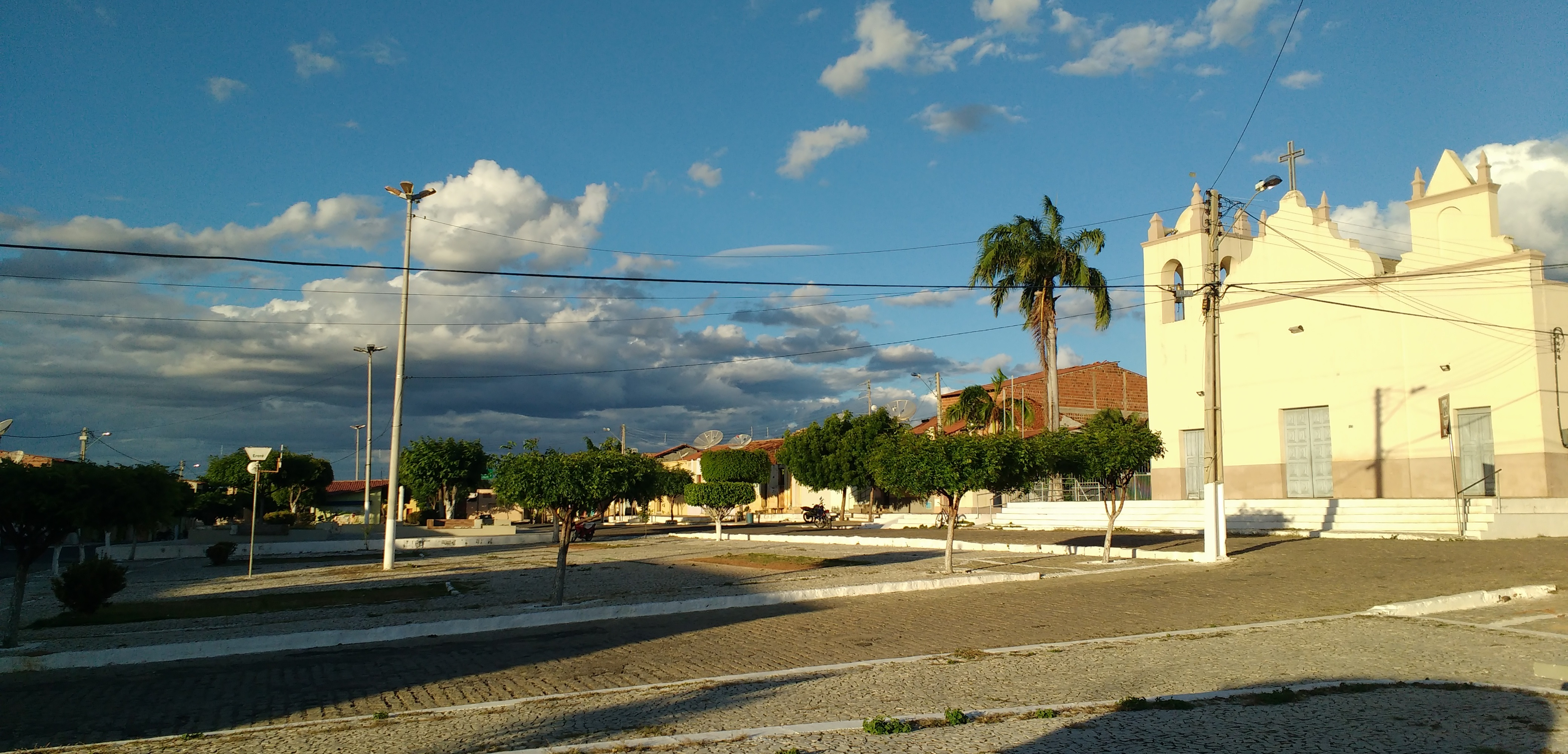

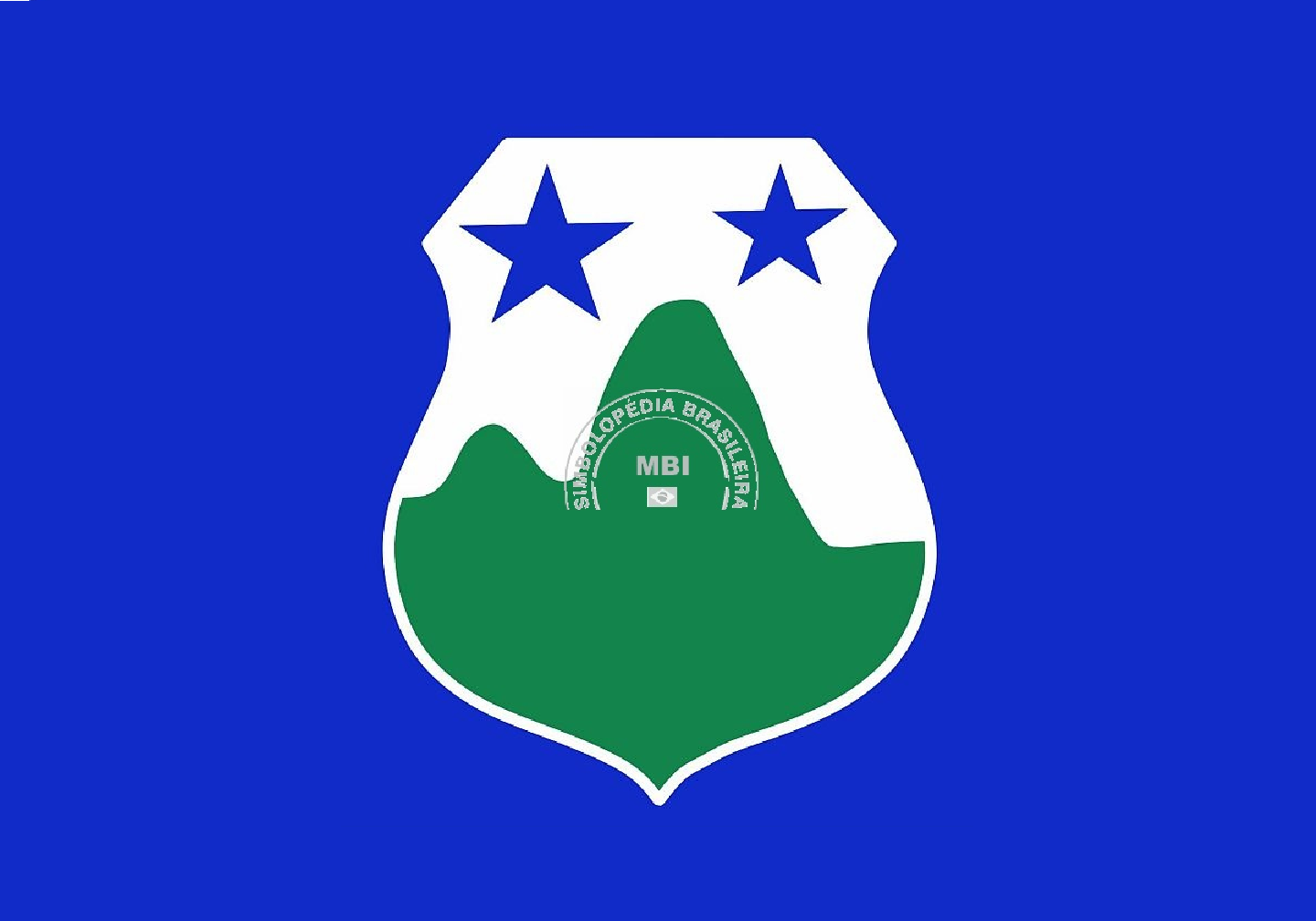
- Flag

- Country: Brazil
- Region: Nordeste
- State: Ceará
- Mesoregion: Jaguaribe

Population (2020)
  - Total: 7,225
- Time zone: UTC−3 (BRT)

Ererê is a municipality in the state of Ceará in the Northeast region of Brazil.

== See also ==
- List of municipalities in Ceará
