= Marco Cé =

Cardinal of the Romanic Catholic Church

His Eminence Marco Cé
- Cardinal, Patriarch Emeritus of Venice
- Church: Roman Catholic Church
- Archdiocese: Venice
- Metropolis: Venice
- See: Venice
- Appointed: 7 December 1978
- Installed: 6 January 1979
- Term ended: 5 January 2002
- Predecessor: Albino Luciani
- Successor: Angelo Scola
- Other post: Cardinal-Priest of San Marco (1979–2014)
- Previous posts: Auxiliary Bishop of Bologna (1970–1978); Titular Bishop of Vulturia (1970–1978)

Orders
- Ordination: 27 March 1948 by Luigi Traglia
- Consecration: 17 May 1970 by Carlo Manziana
- Created cardinal: 30 June 1979 by Pope John Paul II
- Rank: Cardinal-Priest

Personal details
- Born: Marco Cé; 8 July 1925 Izano, Kingdom of Italy
- Died: 12 May 2014 (aged 88) Venice, Italy
- Denomination: Roman Catholic
- Motto: Christus ipse pax ("Christ Himself is peace")
- Coat of arms

Styles of Marco Cé
- Reference style: His Eminence
- Spoken style: Your Eminence
- Informal style: Cardinal
- See: Venice (Emeritus)

Marco Cé (Italian pronunciation: [ˈmarko ˈtʃe]; 8 July 1925 – 12 May 2014) was an Italian cardinal of the Roman Catholic Church. He served as the Patriarch of Venice from 1978 to 2002 and was elevated to the cardinalate in 1979.

== Biography ==
Marco Cé was born in Izano in 1925 to a family of farmers. He studied at the seminary in Crema and later at the Lodi lyceum and at both the Pontifical Gregorian University and the Pontifical Biblical Institute in Rome. From the Gregorian he obtained a doctorate in dogmatic theology and a licentiate in Sacred Scripture.

Cé was ordained to the priesthood by Archbishop Luigi Traglia on 27 March 1948 in the Lateran Basilica in Rome. He then returned to Crema where he served as a professor of Scripture and as the Vice-Rector of the seminary from 1948 to 1957. He was later named rector in 1950 while continuing to teach there. He devoted his time to preach spiritual retreats to the youth of the Catholic Action and also focused on giving regular spiritual exercises to the clergy under his ward.

On 22 April 1970, Cé was appointed as the Auxiliary Bishop of Bologna and the Titular Bishop of Vulturia. He received his episcopal consecration on the following 17 May (Pentecost) from Bishop Carlo Manziana, with Archbishop Franco Costa and Bishop Placido Cambiaghi, CRSP, serving as the co-consecrators. He took as his episcopal motto "Christus ipse pax" which translates as "Christ Himself is peace". He was received in Bologna on 29 June in the cathedral of San Petronio. On 21 May 1976, he was made a chaplain to Azione Cattolica.

After the ascension of Pope John Paul I to the papacy in 1978 and his death thirty-three days later, Cé was named his successor as Patriarch of Venice by Pope John Paul II on 7 December 1978. He took canonical possession of the see on 1 January 1979 and made his official entrance into his new archdiocese on the following 7 January.

Pope John Paul II elevated him into the cardinalate on 30 June 1979 as the Cardinal-Priest of San Marco. Cé resigned as the head of his patriarchate on 5 January 2002. He was also one of the cardinal electors who participated in the 2005 papal conclave that saw the election of Pope Benedict XVI. In 2006, he was invited by Pope Benedict XVI to preach the Lenten spiritual exercises to him and the Roman Curia.

At the conclave of 2005, Cardinal Cé was the oldest of the voting cardinals.

Cardinal Cé fractured his femur in April 2014 and died at the Hospital of Ss. Giovanni e Paolo in Venice on 12 May 2014, at the age of 88.

== Potential beatification ==
In 2015 the Patriarch of Venice, Francesco Moraglia, invited the Venetian people to gather documentation to start the process that would commence the cause of beatification for the late cardinal.

Catholic Church titles
Preceded by Albino Luciani	Patriarch of Venice; 1978–2002	Succeeded by Angelo Scola
Preceded by Albino Luciani	Cardinal-Priest of San Marco; 1979–2014	Succeeded by Angelo De Donatis
