= Hierpiniana =

Africa Proconsularis (125 AD)

Hierpiniana was a Roman era civitas (town) in the Roman province of Byzacena, Roman North Africa. The city was also the seat of an ancient bishopric, which survives today as a titular see of the Roman Catholic Church.

The current titular bishop is Florian Wörner of Germany.

Titular bishops of Hierpiniana
No.	Surname	Office	from	to
1	Adolph Alexander Noser SVD	Apostolic Vicar of Alexishafen ( Papua New Guinea )	January 8, 1953	November 15, 1966
2	Antonio Poma Titular Archbishop Per Hac vice	Coadjutor Archbishop of Bologna (Italy)	July 16, 1967	February 12, 1968
3	Santos Moro Briz	Emeritus Bishop of Ávila ( Spain )	October 19, 1968	December 11, 1970
4	Constantino Amstalden	Coadjutor Bishop of São Carlos ( Brazil )	March 11, 1971	September 19, 1986
5	Jean-Georges Deledicque	Auxiliary Bishop in Lille ( France )	June 19, 1987	August 25, 1997
6	José Francisco Sanches Alves	Auxiliary Bishop in Lisbon ( Portugal )	March 7, 1998	April 22, 2004
7	Severino Batista de França OFMCap	Auxiliary Bishop in Santarém (Brazil)	4 August 2004	March 7, 2007
8th	Paul Lortie	Auxiliary Bishop of Quebec ( Canada )	April 7, 2009	February 1, 2012
9	Florian Woerner	Auxiliary Bishop in Augsburg ( Germany )	June 5, 2012	
