= Antonio Poma =

Italian cardinal of the Catholic Church

His Eminence Antonio Poma
- Archbishop Emeritus of Bologna
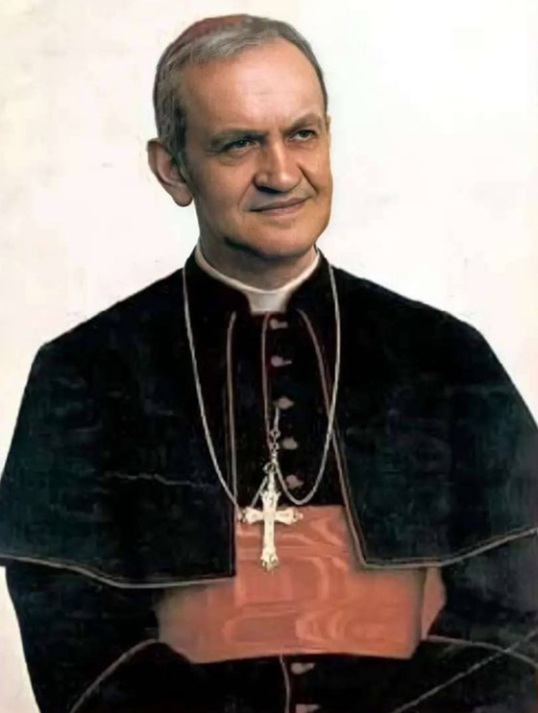
- Church: Roman Catholic Church
- Archdiocese: Bologna
- See: Bologna
- Appointed: 12 February 1968
- Term ended: 11 February 1983
- Predecessor: Giacomo Lercaro
- Successor: Enrico Manfredini
- Other post: Cardinal-Priest of San Luca a Via Prenestina (1969–83)
- Previous posts: Titular Bishop of Thagaste (1951–52); Auxiliary Bishop of Mantua (1951–52); Coadjutor Bishop of Mantua (1952–54); Bishop of Mantua (1954–67); Titular Archbishop of Hierpiniana (1967–68); Coadjutor Archbishop of Bologna (1967–68); President of the Italian Episcopal Conference (1969–79); Apostolic Administrator of Bologna (1983)

Orders
- Ordination: 15 April 1933 by Giuseppe Palica
- Consecration: 9 December 1951 by Carlo Allorio
- Created cardinal: 28 April 1969 by Pope Paul VI
- Rank: Cardinal-Priest

Personal details
- Born: Antonio Poma; 12 June 1910 Villanterio, Kingdom of Italy
- Died: 24 September 1985 (aged 75) Bologna, Italy
- Buried: Bologna Cathedral
- Education: Pontifical Gregorian University
- Motto: Cultura dei agri
- Coat of arms

Antonio Poma (12 June 1910 – 24 September 1985) was an Italian cardinal of the Catholic Church. He served as Archbishop of Bologna from 1968 to 1983, and was elevated to the cardinalate in 1969.

== Biography ==
Poma was born in Villanterio, and studied at the seminary in Pavia and the Pontifical Gregorian University in Rome (from where he obtained his Doctor of Theology degree in 1934). He was ordained to the priesthood by Archbishop Giuseppe Palica on 15 April 1933, in the chapel of the Major Roman Seminary. Before becoming rector of the Pavia seminary in July 1947, he was made private secretary to the Bishop of Pavia and a professor of literature and of dogmatic theology, at the same seminary in 1935.

On 28 October 1951, Poma was appointed auxiliary bishop of Mantua and titular bishop of Thagaste by Pope Pius XII. He received his episcopal consecration on the following 9 December from Bishop Carlo Allorio, with Bishops Vittorio De Zanche and Giuseppe Piazzi serving as co-consecrators, in the Cathedral of Pavia. Poma was named coadjutor bishop of Mantua on 2 August 1952, later succeeding Domenico Menna as bishop of the same on 8 September 1954. From 1962 to 1965, he attended the Second Vatican Council. He was advanced to coadjutor archbishop of Bologna and titular archbishop of Hierpiniana on 16 July 1967. On 12 February 1968, Poma succeeded Giacomo Lercaro as Archbishop of Bologna upon the latter's resignation.

During his tenure as Archbishop of Bologna, he founded the second House of Charity, the Mensa della fraternità or Poor People's Refectory, the Diocesan Charitas and the Mission of the Bolognese Church in Tanzania.

Pope Paul VI created him cardinal-priest of San Luca a Via Prenestina in the consistory of 28 April 1969. From 1969 to 1979, Poma served as president of the Italian Episcopal Conference; during this capacity, he warned that Catholics who support communism separate themselves from the Church. He was also one of the cardinal electors who participated in the conclaves of August and October 1978, which selected Popes John Paul I and John Paul II respectively. On 11 February 1983, the Cardinal resigned as Bologna's archbishop, after almost fourteen years of service. He continued to govern the archdiocese as its apostolic administrator until the appointment of Bishop Enrico Manfredini on the following 18 March.

Poma also suffered from erysipelas.

Poma died in Bologna, at age 75. He is buried in the metropolitan cathedral of the same city.

Catholic Church titles
Preceded by Domenico Menna	Bishop of Mantua; 1954–1967	Succeeded by Carlo Ferrari
Preceded by Giacomo Lercaro	Archbishop of Bologna; 1968–1983	Succeeded by Enrico Manfredini
Preceded by Giovanni Urbani	President of the Italian Episcopal Conference; 1969–1979	Succeeded by Anastasio Ballestrero
