= Dionigi Tettamanzi =

Catholic cardinal

His Eminence Dionigi Tettamanzi
- Cardinal, Archbishop of Milan
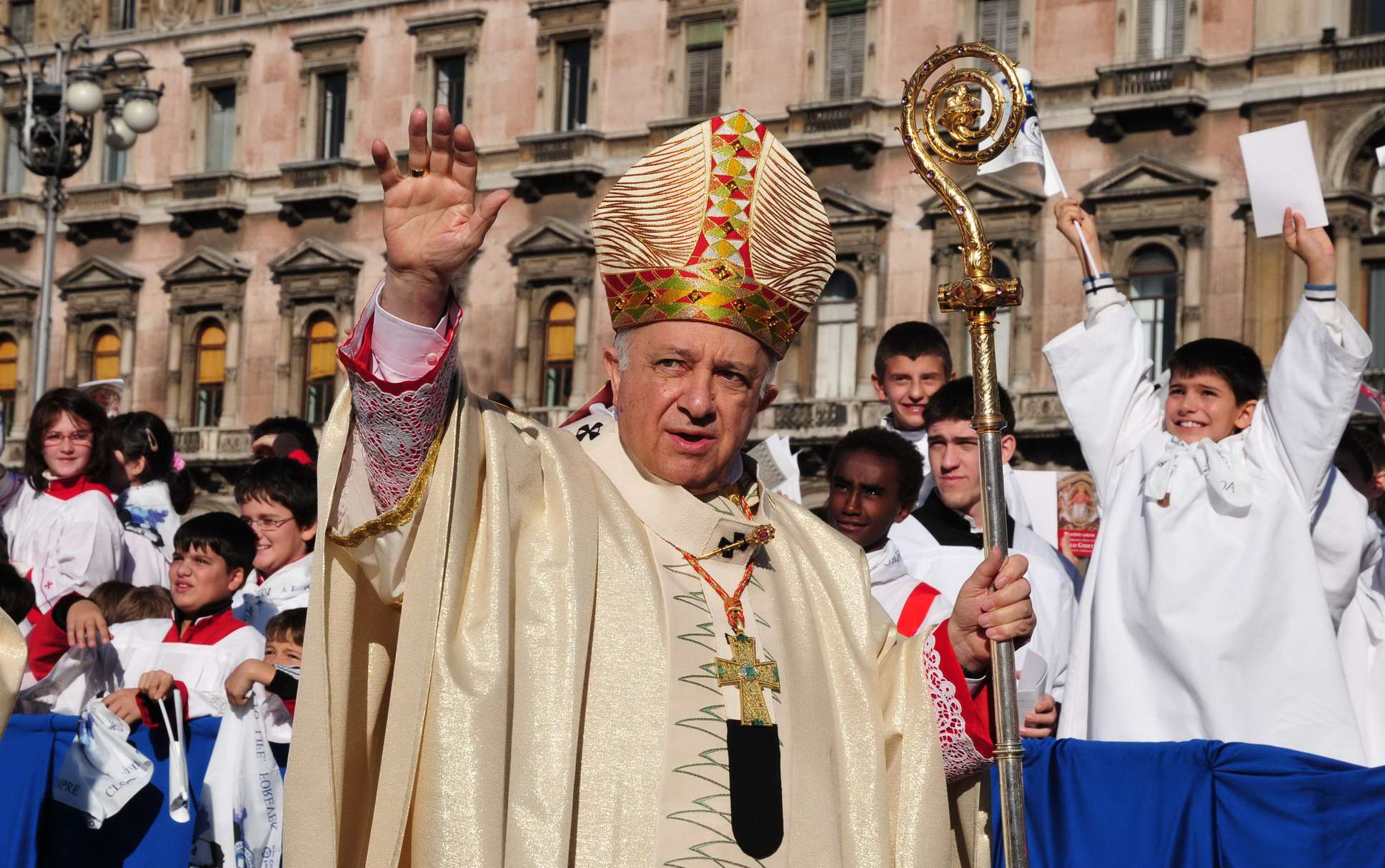
- Tettamanzi in 2011
- See: Milan
- Appointed: 11 July 2002
- Installed: 14 September 2002
- Term ended: 28 June 2011
- Predecessor: Carlo Maria Martini
- Successor: Angelo Scola
- Other post: Cardinal-Priest of Santi Ambrogio e Carlo
- Previous posts: Apostolic Administrator of Vigevano (2012–2013); Archbishop of Genoa (1995–2002); Archbishop of Ancona-Osimo (1989–1991)

Orders
- Ordination: 28 June 1957 by Giovanni Battista Enrico Antonio Maria Montini (later Pope Paul VI)
- Consecration: 23 September 1989 by Carlo Maria Martini
- Created cardinal: 21 February 1998 by John Paul II
- Rank: Cardinal-Priest

Personal details
- Born: 14 March 1934 Renate, Kingdom of Italy
- Died: 5 August 2017 (aged 83) Triuggio, Italy
- Denomination: Roman Catholic
- Motto: Gaudium et pax (Joy and peace)

- Coat of arms

Styles of Dionigi Tettamanzi
- Reference style: His Eminence
- Spoken style: Your Eminence
- Religious style: Monsignor
- Informal style: Cardinal
- See: Milan (emeritus)

Dionigi Tettamanzi (14 March 1934 – 5 August 2017) was an Italian prelate of the Roman Catholic Church, who was named a cardinal in 1998. He was Archbishop of Genoa from 1995 to 2002 and Archbishop of Milan from 2002 to 2011.

== Early years ==
Tettamanzi was born on 14 March 1934 in Renate, then in the province of Milan, now in the province of Monza and Brianza. He was educated at the Minor Seminary of Seveso and the Seminary of Venegono Inferiore and finally at the Pontifical Gregorian University in Rome where he earned a doctorate in theology. After studying in local seminaries, he was ordained a priest on 28 June 1957 by Archbishop Giovanni Battista Montini, the future Pope Paul VI. He served in the Archdiocese of Milan as a pastor and faculty member at the Minor Seminary of Masnago and of Seveso San Pietro from 1960 until 1966. He was a faculty member of the Seminary of Venegono from 1966 to 1986.

== Bishop ==
On 1 July 1989 Pope John Paul II named Tettamanzi Archbishop of Ancona-Osimo. He received his episcopal consecration from Cardinal Carlo Maria Martini at the Milan cathedral on 23 September. Tettamanzi submitted his resignation as bishop on 6 April 1991 to take up a five-year assignment as Secretary-General of the Italian Episcopal Conference.

John Paul II appointed him Archbishop of Genoa on 20 April 1995. He helped John Paul draft his 1995 encyclical Evangelium Vitae (1995).

At the consistory of 21 February 1998, Tettamanzi was created Cardinal-Priest of Ss. Ambrogio e Carlo. He was named to succeed Martini as archbishop of Milan on 11 July 2002.

Although thought one of the favourite candidates to succeed John Paul II in 2005, there were reports that he received few votes in the conclave. Tettamanzi was said to speak only Italian. He was little known outside his own country.

In 2006, giving the opening address at the decennial conference of the Italian Catholic Church, he challenged the traditional alliance of the hierarchy with the country's conservative parties and called for more flexibility in forming alliances in contrast to the preference of Cardinal Camillo Ruini, head of the Italian Episcopal Conference, for Silvio Berlusconi. He said: "It is better to be Christian without saying it, than to proclaim it without being it".

In response to Pope Benedict's Summorum Pontificum of July 2007, Tettamanzi stated that the rules it presented for the celebration of the Mass in different forms did not apply to the Milan archdiocese since it uses the Ambrosian Rite rather than the Roman.

In March 2009, as required upon reaching the age of 75, he submitted his resignation, and Pope Benedict accepted it on the 54th anniversary of his ordination to the priesthood, 28 June 2011. In retirement, Tettamanzi lived at the Villa Sacro Cuore, a retreat house of the Milan Archdiocese, in Triuggio.

In July 2012, he was named apostolic administrator of the Diocese of Vigevano. He served in that post for a year.

He was one of the cardinal electors who participated in the 2013 papal conclave that selected Pope Francis.

In 2015, at the behest of Pope Francis, he produced a study of the feasibility of creating a Dicastery for the Laity, Family and Life for consideration by the Council of Cardinals. In September 2015, Pope Francis nominated him to participate in the Synod on the Family in October. He supported, under certain conditions, admitting the divorced and remarried to the Eucharist.

He died on 5 August 2017, after a long illness. Cardinal Tettamanzi is buried in the metropolitan Cathedral of Milan.

== Views ==
=== Social relations ===
In his speech on St. Ambrose day in 2008, he said that Muslims have the right to build their mosques in the cities of predominantly Catholic countries. In his speech on St. Ambrose day 2010 he defended immigrants to Italy against attempts to classify them as criminals.

=== Remarried Catholics ===
In 2008, in a letter addressed to Catholics who had divorced and remarried, he wrote:

The fact that these relationships are frequently lived with a sense of responsibility and with love among the couple and for the children is a reality that the Church and its pastors take into account. It is an error to think that the norm regulating access to Eucharistic Communion means that divorced and remarried couples are excluded from a life of faith and charity, lived within the ecclesial community.

He said he wanted to "establish dialogue ... to try to hear about your daily life, to allow myself to be questioned by some of your questions.... The Church has not forgotten nor rejected you, nor does it consider you unworthy. For the Church, and for me, as a bishop, you are my beloved brothers and sisters."

In 2014, he published Il Vangelo della misericordia per le famiglie ferite (The Gospel of Mercy for Wounded Families) and said he anticipated allowing divorced and remarried Catholics to receive communion as long as there is no confusion about the Church's insistence on the indissolubility of marriage and there is "a restored commitment to Christian life through faithful paths that are true and serious."

Catholic Church titles
Preceded by Camillo Ruini	Secretary-General of the Italian Episcopal Conference; 14 March 1991 – 20 April 1995	Succeeded by Ennio Antonelli
Preceded by Giovanni Canestri	Archbishop of Genova; 20 April 1995 – 11 July 2002	Succeeded by Tarcisio Bertone SDB
Preceded by Carlo Maria Martini	Archbishop of Milan; 11 July 2002 – 28 June 2011	Succeeded by Angelo Scola
Preceded by Ugo Poletti	Cardinal-Priest of SS Ambrogio e Carlo; 21 February 1998 – 5 August 2017	Vacant
