= Angelo Scola =

Italian Cardinal, philosopher and theologian

His Eminence Angelo Scola
- Cardinal, Archbishop Emeritus of Milan
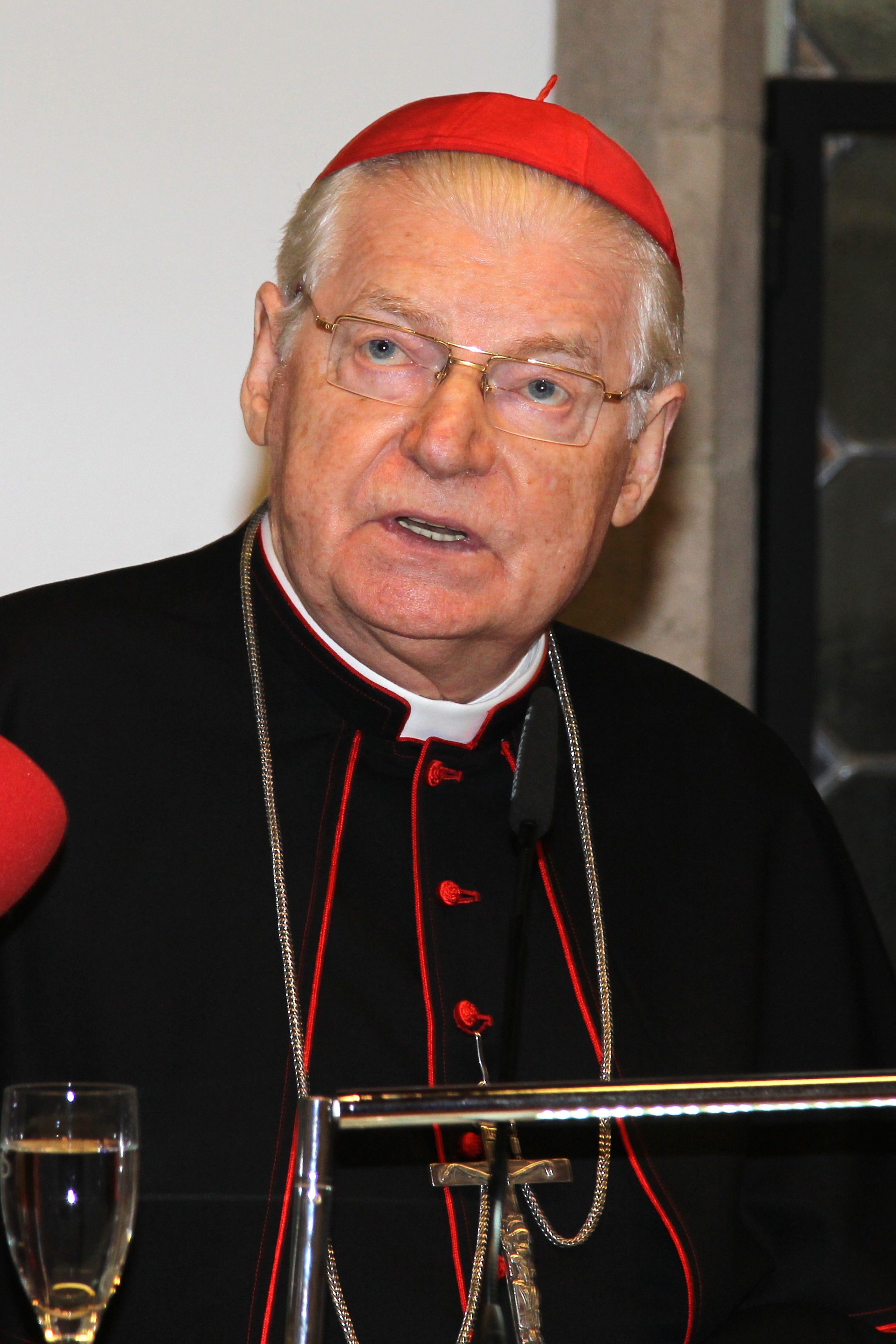
- Cardinal Scola in 2014.
- Church: Roman Catholic Church
- Archdiocese: Milan
- Metropolis: Milan
- See: Milan
- Appointed: 28 June 2011
- Installed: 25 September 2011
- Term ended: 7 July 2017
- Predecessor: Dionigi Tettamanzi
- Successor: Mario Enrico Delpini
- Other post: Cardinal-Priest of Santi XII Apostoli (2003–present)
- Previous posts: Bishop of Grosseto (1991–95); Rector Magnificus of the Lateran University (1995–2002); President of the Pontifical John Paul II Institute (1995–2002); Patriarch of Venice (2002–11); Apostolic Administrator of Treviso (2009); Apostolic Administrator of Venice (2011)

Orders
- Ordination: 18 July 1970 by Abele Conigli
- Consecration: 21 September 1991 by Bernardin Gantin
- Created cardinal: 21 October 2003 by Pope John Paul II
- Rank: Cardinal-Priest

Personal details
- Born: Angelo Scola; 7 November 1941 (age 85) Malgrate, Kingdom of Italy
- Motto: Latin: Sufficit gratia Tua (Your Grace Suffices)
- Signature: Angelo Scola's signature

- Coat of arms: Angelo Scola's coat of arms

Ordination history of Angelo Scola
History
Priestly ordination
- Ordained by: Abele Conigli
- Date: 18 July 1970
- Place: Santa Maria del Carmine, Florence
Episcopal consecration
- Principal consecrator: Bernardin Gantin
- Co-consecrators: Adelmo Tacconi Abele Conigli
- Date: 21 September 1991
- Place: Santa Maria Maggiore, Rome
Cardinalate
- Elevated by: John Paul II
- Date: 21 October 2003
Episcopal succession
Bishops consecrated by Angelo Scola as principal consecrator
- Giuseppe Andrich: 2004
- Beniamino Pizziol: 2008
- Karl Golser: 2009
- Adelio Dell’Oro: 2013
- Franco Maria Giuseppe Agnesi: 2014
- Paolo Martinelli: 2014
- Pierantonio Tremolada: 2014
- Piergiorgio Bertoldi: 2015

Angelo Scola ([ˈandʒelo ˈskɔːla]; born 7 November 1941) is an Italian Cardinal of the Catholic Church, a prominent philosopher, and theologian. He served as Archbishop of Milan from 2011 to 2017, overseeing one of the largest dioceses in the world, and previously as Patriarch of Venice from 2002 to 2011. Elevated to the cardinalate in 2003 by Pope John Paul II, Scola has been a key figure in contemporary Catholic theology, particularly in areas of anthropological theology, marriage and family, and ecumenical dialogue.

His scholarly work, influenced by thinkers such as Hans Urs von Balthasar and Henri de Lubac, emphasizes the nuptial mystery as a central motif in understanding Christian faith and human existence.

Scola's ecclesiastical career spans over five decades, beginning with his ordination in 1970 and including significant roles in academia and the Roman Curia. As a professor and rector at the Pontifical Lateran University, he advanced theological education, particularly in marriage and family studies.

His pastoral leadership in Grosseto, Venice, and Milan focused on catechesis, youth formation, and cultural engagement, while his curial appointments addressed doctrine, clergy, and new evangelization. Scola was considered a leading candidate in the papal conclaves of 2005 and 2013, and though ineligible to vote due to age, he participated in the 2025 conclave following the death of Pope Francis.

In retirement, he continues to contribute through writings on aging, death, and Christian hope, including his 2025 book Awaiting a New Beginning: Reflections on Old Age, prefaced by Pope Francis. Renowned for his intellectual rigor and pastoral openness, Scola has authored numerous works translated into multiple languages, exploring bioethics, anthropology, and ecclesiology. He founded initiatives like the Studium Generale Marcianum and the journal Oasis to foster interfaith dialogue, particularly with Islam. His theology integrates tradition with contemporary challenges, advocating for the indissolubility of marriage while promoting ecumenism and the renewal inspired by the Second Vatican Council. As of 2025, Scola resides in Imberido, Italy, remaining an influential voice in Catholic thought.

== Early life and education ==
Angelo Scola was born on 7 November 1941 in Malgrate, a small town near Lecco in the Province of Lecco, then part of the Kingdom of Italy. He was the younger of two sons born to Carlo Scola, a truck driver, and Regina Colombo, a homemaker. His elder brother, Pietro, died in 1983. Growing up in a modest working-class family during the post-World War II era, Scola's early life was marked by the economic hardships of northern Italy's industrial regions, which later influenced his pastoral concern for laborers. Scola attended the Manzoni Lyceum in Lecco, where he excelled academically and became involved in Catholic youth movements. He was an active participant in Gioventù Studentesca (Student Youth), a precursor to Communion and Liberation, fostering his early interest in faith and community. From 1964 to 1967, he studied philosophy at the Università Cattolica del Sacro Cuore in Milan, earning a doctorate with a dissertation on Christian philosophy under Gustavo Bontadini. During this period, he served as vice-president and then president of the Milanese chapter of the Federazione Universitaria Cattolica Italiana (FUCI), the university arm of Catholic Action. At the university, Scola encountered Luigi Giussani, founder of Communion and Liberation, whose emphasis on lived faith profoundly shaped his spirituality. After teaching in high schools, Scola entered the Archiepiscopal Seminary of Milan in 1967, studying in Saronno and Venegono Inferiore. In 1969, denied early ordination as a subdeacon by Milanese authorities, he transferred to the Diocese of Teramo-Atri on Giussani's advice. He was ordained a priest on 18 July 1970 in Teramo by Bishop Abele Conigli. Scola pursued further studies, earning a doctorate in theology from the University of Fribourg in Switzerland, with a dissertation on Thomas Aquinas. Influenced by the Nouvelle Théologie, he collaborated on the journal Communio, editing its Italian edition and conducting interviews with de Lubac and von Balthasar. He conducted research in Munich and Paris, engaging in pastoral work before returning to Fribourg as a research assistant in political philosophy (1979–1982).

== Academic career ==
In 1982, Scola was appointed Professor of Theological Anthropology at the Pontifical John Paul II Institute for Studies on Marriage and Family and Professor of Contemporary Christology at the Pontifical Lateran University. He promoted scholarships for international students, particularly from developing countries. From 1986 to 1991, he served as a consultor to the Congregation for the Doctrine of the Faith. Scola's theological contributions focus on anthropological themes, drawing from von Balthasar's aesthetics and de Lubac's ecclesiology. His work on the "nuptial mystery" posits marriage as a paradigm for understanding God's relationship with humanity, influencing his views on family and bioethics. He has published extensively on human sexuality, ethics, and Christology, emphasizing the integration of faith and reason.

== Episcopal ministry ==
=== Bishop of Grosseto (1991–1995) ===
On 18 July 1991, Pope John Paul II appointed Scola Bishop of Grosseto. He was consecrated on 21 September by Cardinal Bernardin Gantin, with Bishops Conigli and Tacconi as co-consecrators. Adopting the motto Sufficit gratia tua (2 Corinthians 12:9), Scola prioritized catechetical renewal, reopening the diocesan seminary and emphasizing youth education. His pastoral initiatives included vocational promotion, parish revitalization, and support for workers amid industrial decline. He established a diocesan mission in Santa Cruz, Bolivia, and authored a book on the Church's educative role for young people. Scola's tenure highlighted cultural and familial concerns, laying groundwork for his later emphases.

=== Rector of the Pontifical Lateran University and curial roles (1995–2002) ===
Resigning from Grosseto in 1995, Scola became Rector of the Pontifical Lateran University and President of the Pontifical John Paul II Institute. He spent a term as visiting professor in Washington, D.C., authoring a monograph on von Balthasar. He joined the Congregation for the Clergy (1995), chaired the Italian Bishops' Episcopal Commission for Catholic Education (1996), and served on the Pontifical Council for Health Workers (1996–2001), authoring texts on healthcare ethics. In 1996, he joined the Pontifical Council for the Family. These roles deepened his engagement with doctrinal and pastoral issues.

=== Patriarch of Venice (2002–2011) ===
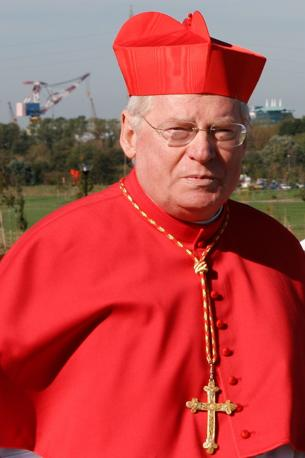

Appointed Patriarch of Venice on 5 January 2002, Scola was installed amid expectations of intellectual leadership. Elected president of the Triveneto Bishops' Conference in April, he was created Cardinal-Priest of Santi XII Apostoli on 21 October 2003. In Venice, Scola emphasized openness, holding weekly open meetings. He founded the Studium Generale Marcianum for academic formation and Oasis journal for Christian-Muslim dialogue. Scola administered the Diocese of Treviso in 2009 and Venice in 2011. Considered papabile in 2005, he advocated for cultural engagement to evangelize society.

=== Archbishop of Milan (2011–2017) ===
On 28 June 2011, Pope Benedict XVI named Scola Archbishop of Milan, succeeding Cardinal Tettamanzi. He took possession by proxy on 9 September and was enthroned on 25 September, receiving the pallium from Benedict. In Milan, Scola focused on new evangelization, youth, and family. He joined the Congregation for the Oriental Churches (2012) and Congregation for the Doctrine of the Faith (2012). Multilingual, he engaged diverse communities. A frontrunner in the 2013 conclave, an erroneous announcement by Italian bishops named him pope before Francis' election. Pope Francis accepted his resignation on 7 July 2017, appointing Bishop Mario Delpini.

== Retirement and later activities ==
In retirement, Scola resides in Imberido near Lake Annone, focusing on writing and reflection. Though over 80 and ineligible to vote, he attended the 2025 papal conclave following Pope Francis' death in March 2025. In April 2025, the Vatican published his book Awaiting a New Beginning: Reflections on Old Age, with a preface by Pope Francis written in February 2025. The work explores aging and death through a Christian lens, emphasizing hope and eternity. Scola's post-retirement contributions continue to address existential themes, bridging theology and human experience.

== Theological views and contributions ==
Scola's theology is characterized by a synthesis of tradition and modernity, influenced by Communion and Liberation's experiential approach. He emphasizes the Church's cultural role, arguing for engagement beyond the sacristy.

=== Marriage and family ===
At the 2014–2015 Synods on the Family, Scola opposed Communion for divorced and remarried couples without continence, viewing it as contradicting marriage's indissolubility. He stresses pastoral accompaniment while upholding doctrine.

=== Ecumenism and interfaith dialogue ===
Scola advocates grassroots ecumenism with Islam and Orthodoxy, addressing persecution and shared issues like family and justice. His Oasis initiative promotes dialogue.

=== Second Vatican Council and liturgy ===
Scola interprets Vatican II as enriching continuity, not rupture. He contributed to the Pontifical Council for the New Evangelization.

== Works ==
Scola has authored over 120 articles and numerous books on theology, anthropology, and ethics, translated into several languages.

Selected publications

Hans Urs Von Balthasar: A Theological Style (1995) ISBN 0-8028-0894-8 The Nuptial Mystery (2005) ISBN 0-8028-2831-0 Il morire tra ragione e fede (2014, with Emanuele Severino et al.) ISBN 9788865122594 Simon Called Peter: In the Footsteps of a Man Following God (2011) Betting on Freedom (2021) Awaiting a New Beginning: Reflections on Old Age (2025)

Online texts

- Which Foundation? (PDF)
- The Nuptial Mystery: A Perspective for Systematic Theology? (PDF)
- Christian Experience and Theology
- Satanic Rites in the Church's Judgement

Catholic Church titles
Preceded by Adelmo Tacconi	Bishop of Grosseto; 20 July 1991 – 14 September 1995	Succeeded by Giacomo Babini
Preceded by Umberto Betti	Rector Magnificus of the Pontifical Lateran University; 14 September 1995 – 5 January 2002	Succeeded by Salvatore Fisichella
Preceded by Marco Cé	Patriarch of Venice; 5 January 2002 – 28 June 2011	Succeeded by Francesco Moraglia
Preceded by Giovanni Battista Re	Cardinal-Priest of Santi XII Apostoli; 21 October 2003 –	Incumbent
Preceded by Dionigi Tettamanzi	Archbishop of Milan; 9 September 2011 – 7 July 2017	Succeeded by Mario Enrico Delpini
