= Liber Paradisus =

Bolognese law proclaiming the abolition of slavery

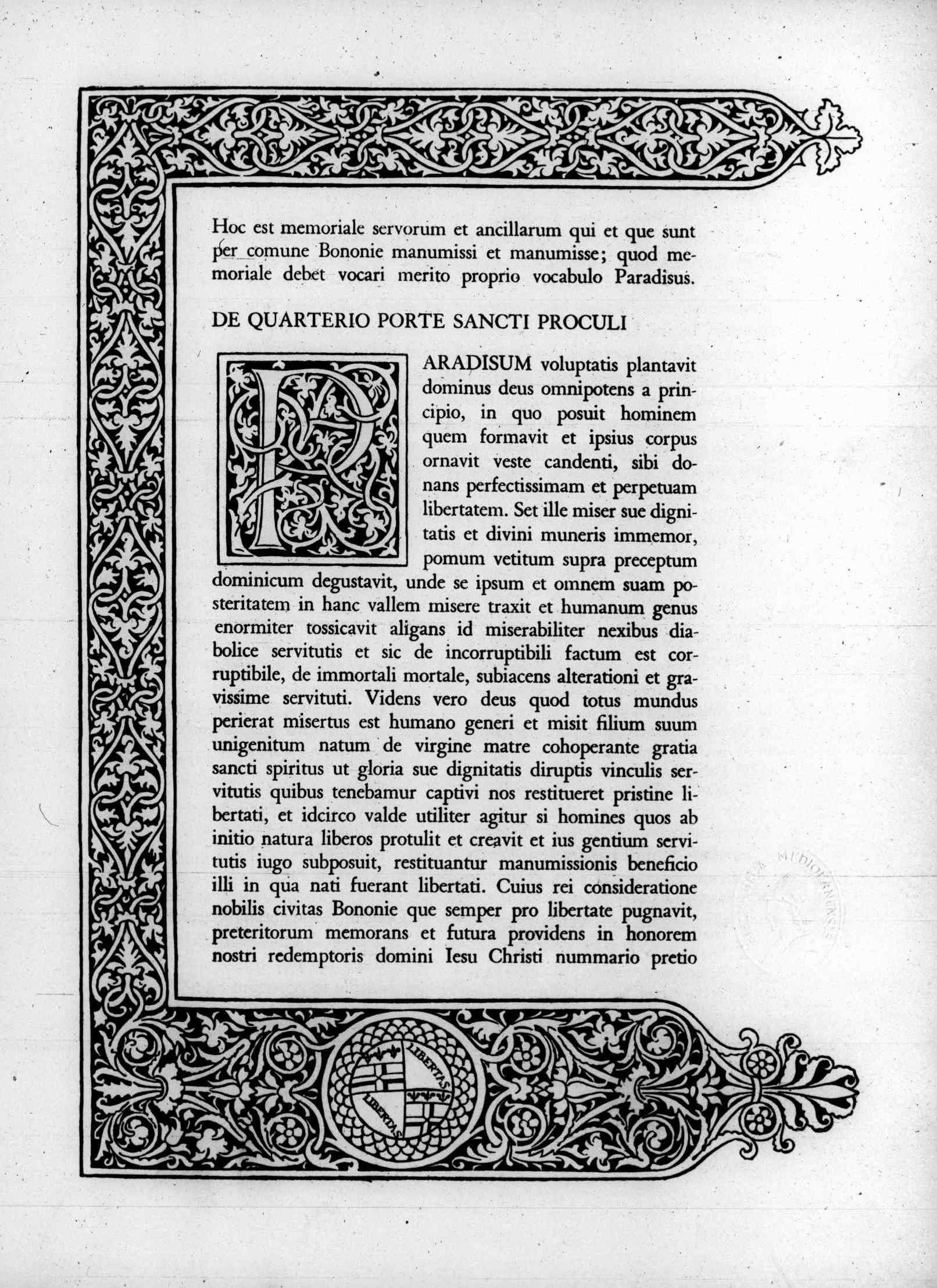
Liber paradisus, 1956 edition by Francesco Saverio Gatta and Giuseppe Plessi

The Liber Paradisus (Paradise Book) is a law promulgated in 1256 by the Commune of Bologna which proclaimed the abolition of slavery and the release of serfs (servi della gleba).

== History ==
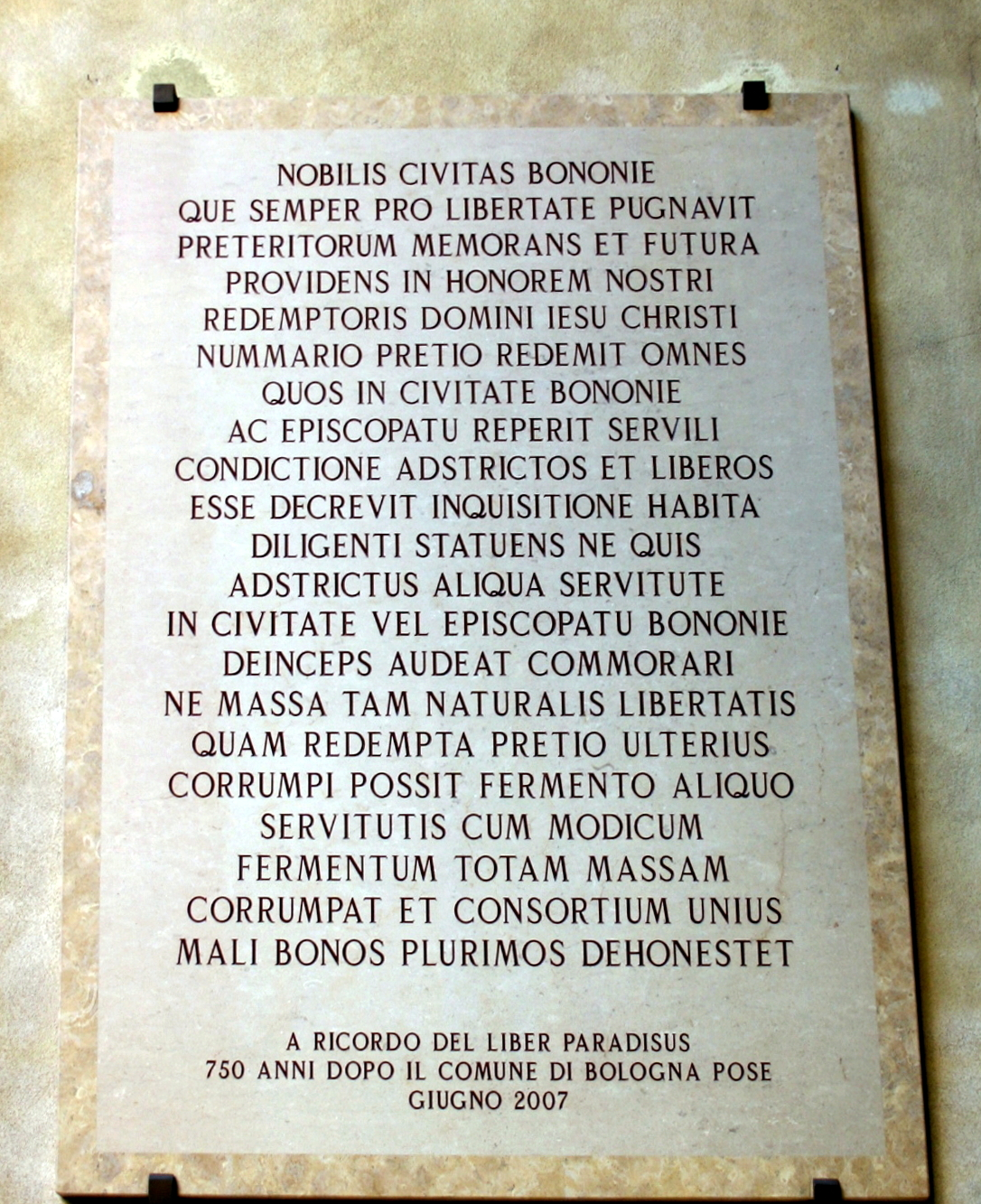
Plaque for the 750° anniversary with a citation of the "Liber Paradisus" at Palazzo d'Accursio, Bologna.

After the battle of Fossalta (1249), the expansion of the Bologna commune led to the progressive defeat or submission of almost all Signorie (Lordships) in the surrounding countryside. This geopolitical shift triggered an ethical and economic reflection on the serfs' status, until then determined by their bond to their owners, called Signori (Lords).

On 25 August 1256, the Arengo bell of the Palace of Podestà called Bolognese citizens into the Piazza Maggiore, where the Podestà (head of city government, expression of urban aristocracy), Bonaccorso da Soresina, and the Capitano del popolo (head of city militia, expression of urban bourgeoisie) announced the liberation of about 6,000 serfs, owned by 400 lords. They were emancipated by the payment, from the communal treasury, of 8 (for children) or 10 (for adults) Bolognese silver lire, which was the standard market price. For the exact emancipation of 5,855 serfs, the Commune paid a total of 54,014 Bolognese Lire.

There was a clear economic benefit for the city in the emancipation of so many serfs: firstly, free men were considered more productive agricultural workers; secondly, freedmen were no longer exempt from the taxes of the Commune (and, in fact, the Commune forbade freed serfs to move outside the diocese to which they belonged). In some cases, the serfs were gathered in certain free places (Italian: franco), from which the names of towns like Castelfranco Emilia originated. A combination of theological, fiscal, and practical concerns led to this extraordinary mass manumission, and the text itself functions as a powerful treatise on human equality.

== "Book of Paradise" ==
In 1257, the Commune ordered four notaries—among them the prominent jurist Rolandino de' Passaggeri—to catalogue the names and structural details of the freed serfs in an official memorial register. This book is now preserved at the State Archives of Bologna (in Piazza dei Celestini), and it is conventionally called Paradisus because the first written word of the text is Paradise, reminding that God created man in perfect and perpetual freedom.

The Latin incipit reads:

«Paradisum voluptatis plantavit dominus Deus omnipotens a principio, in quo posuit hominem, quem formaverat, et ipsius corpus ornavit veste candenti, sibi donans perfectissimam et perpetuam libertatem»

(«In the beginning God planted a paradise of delights, where he put the man whom he had formed, and adorned his body of a bright dress, giving him the most perfect and perpetual freedom»)

== Socio-political context ==
Modern historiography has highlighted that the promulgation of the Liber Paradisus was also a strategic political and fiscal maneuver by the rising Commune of Bologna. By emancipating the serfs, the municipality effectively weakened the economic power and military leverage of the traditional feudal nobility and rural lords (signori del contado) who controlled the agricultural workforce in the Bolognese plains and neighboring hills.

The financial compensation provided by the commune often accelerated the transition of these rural aristocratic lineages toward urban integration (inurbamento). Legal deeds and contemporary notary registries show that several noble clans deeply rooted in the territory—such as the Lambertini, the Nordigli, and the Biancuzzi family of Medicina—gradually shifted their interests toward the city, reinvesting their capitals in urban real estate and tower construction while their former agricultural estates were restructured under the commune's direct taxation.

== Editions ==
- Francesco Saverio Gatta and Giuseppe Plessi, ed. (1956). Liber paradisus (in Latin). Bologna: Luigi Parma.

== See also ==
- Liber Paradisus
- Battle of Fossalta
- Towers of Bologna
