= History of the world's tallest buildings =

The tallest building in the world, as of 2026, is the Burj Khalifa in Dubai, United Arab Emirates. The title of "world's tallest building" has been held by various buildings in modern times, including Lincoln Cathedral in Lincoln, England, the Empire State Building and the original World Trade Center, both in New York City.

Before the modern skyscraper era emerged, between c. 1311 and 1884, the tallest buildings and structures were mostly Christian churches and cathedrals. Prior to then, the tallest buildings in the world cannot be conclusively determined. For instance, the Lighthouse of Alexandria, which was completed in approximately 280 BC, has been estimated to have been 100 m (330 ft) tall, but its true height is not known. For thousands of years, the Great Pyramid in Egypt was the tallest structure in the world until Lincoln Cathedral of 1311, but the Great Pyramid is not considered a building since it is not habitable. Similarly, the Eiffel Tower was the world's tallest structure from 1889, when it was built, but not the tallest building.

The skyscraper was invented in Chicago in 1884 when Home Insurance Building was constructed using a steel frame with curtain walls instead of load-bearing walls. For the next century, the world's tallest building was always in the United States, with New York City housing the tallest building for 86 years and Chicago housing it for 30 years. After a century (1894–1998), the distinction of the world's tallest building moved to Malaysia, which was the first country to break the United States' record of constructing the tallest buildings in the world when Petronas Towers was completed in 1998. Taiwan's Taipei 101 was the next to hold the record; the building's status as the world's tallest building lasted from 2004 to 2009, when it was transferred to the Burj Khalifa, the current record-holder of 828 meters tall, upon its completion in the United Arab Emirates.

== Definition of terms ==
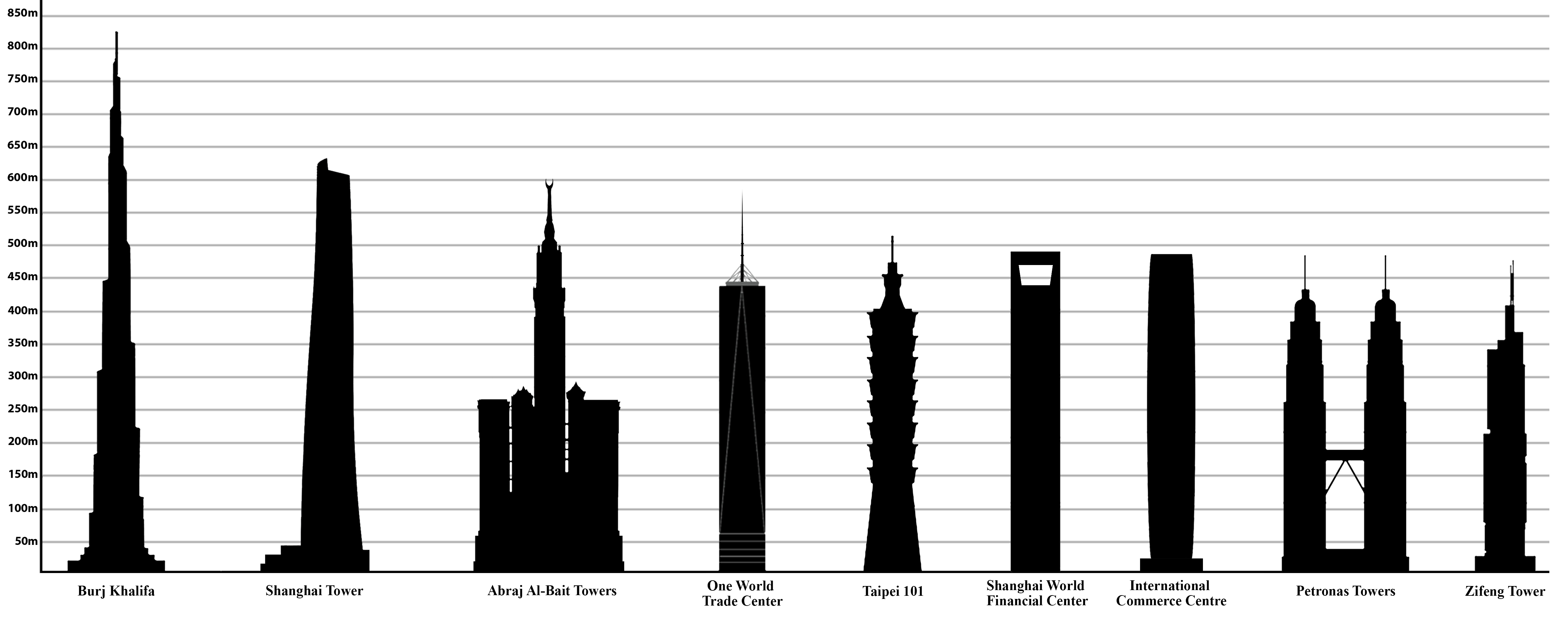
The world's tallest buildings as of 2015

=== Meaning of "building" ===
The earliest structures now known to be the tallest in the world were the Egyptian pyramids: the Great Pyramid of Giza, at an original height of 146.5 m (481 ft), was the tallest structure in the world for over 3,800 years, until the construction of Lincoln Cathedral in 1311. From then until the completion of the Washington Monument (capped in 1884) the world's tallest structures were churches or cathedrals. Later, the Eiffel Tower and, still later, some radio masts and television towers, were the world's tallest structures.

However, though all of these are structures, some are not buildings in the sense of being regularly inhabited or occupied. It is in this sense of being regularly inhabited or occupied that the term "building" is generally applied when determining the world's tallest building. The non-profit international organization Council on Tall Buildings and Urban Habitat (CTBUH), which maintains a set of criteria for determining the height of tall buildings, defines a "building" as "(A) structure that is designed for residential, business or manufacturing purposes" and that "has floors".

Tall churches and cathedrals occupy a middle ground: their lower areas are regularly occupied, but much of their height is in bell towers and spires which are not. Whether a church or cathedral is a "building" or merely a "structure" for the purposes of determining the title of "world's tallest building" is a subjective matter of definition (this article treats churches and cathedrals as buildings).

=== Determination of height ===
The Council on Tall Buildings and Urban Habitat (CTBUH) has been generally recognized as the arbiter on the building height of skyscrapers since the mid-20th century. In the early 1970's they promulgated the criteria that height is measured "from the sidewalk of the main entrance to the structural top of the building including penthouse and tower." In 1996, during the controversy over whether the Petronas Twin Towers or the Sears Tower should be considered the world's tallest building, the CTBUH adopted three new height criteria. When determining the height of a tall building, each of the three criteria may give a different result. "Height of the highest floor" is one criterion, and "height to the top of any part of the building" is another, but the default criterion used by the CTBUH is "height of the architectural top of the building", which includes spires but not antennas, masts or flag poles.

== Before the 20th century ==
=== Before the 13th century ===
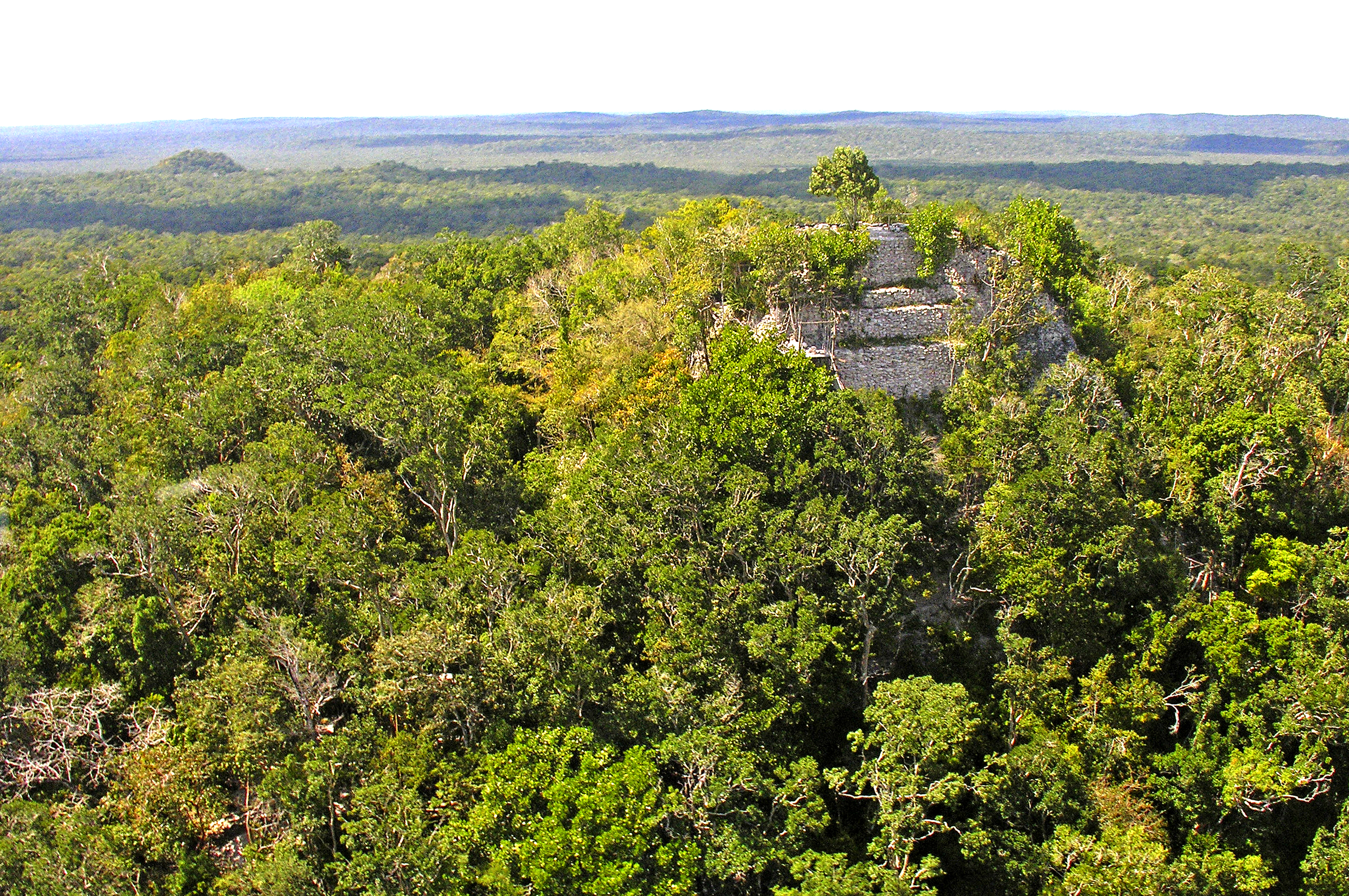
La Danta in El Mirador, Guatemala, a 72 m (236 ft) tall temple built in 300 BC.

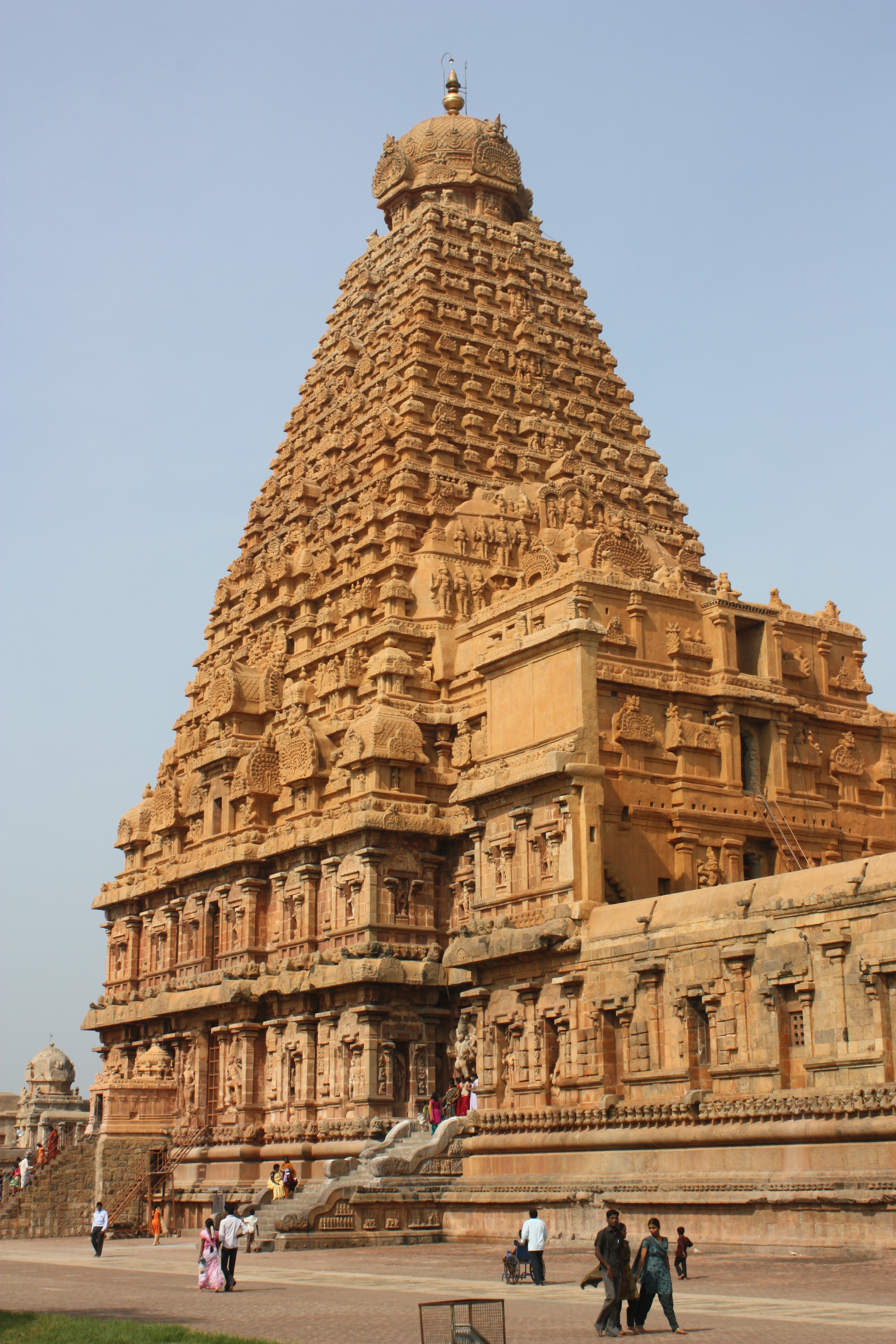
Vimana of Brihadisvara Temple, Thanjavur, Tamilnadu at 66 m (217 ft)

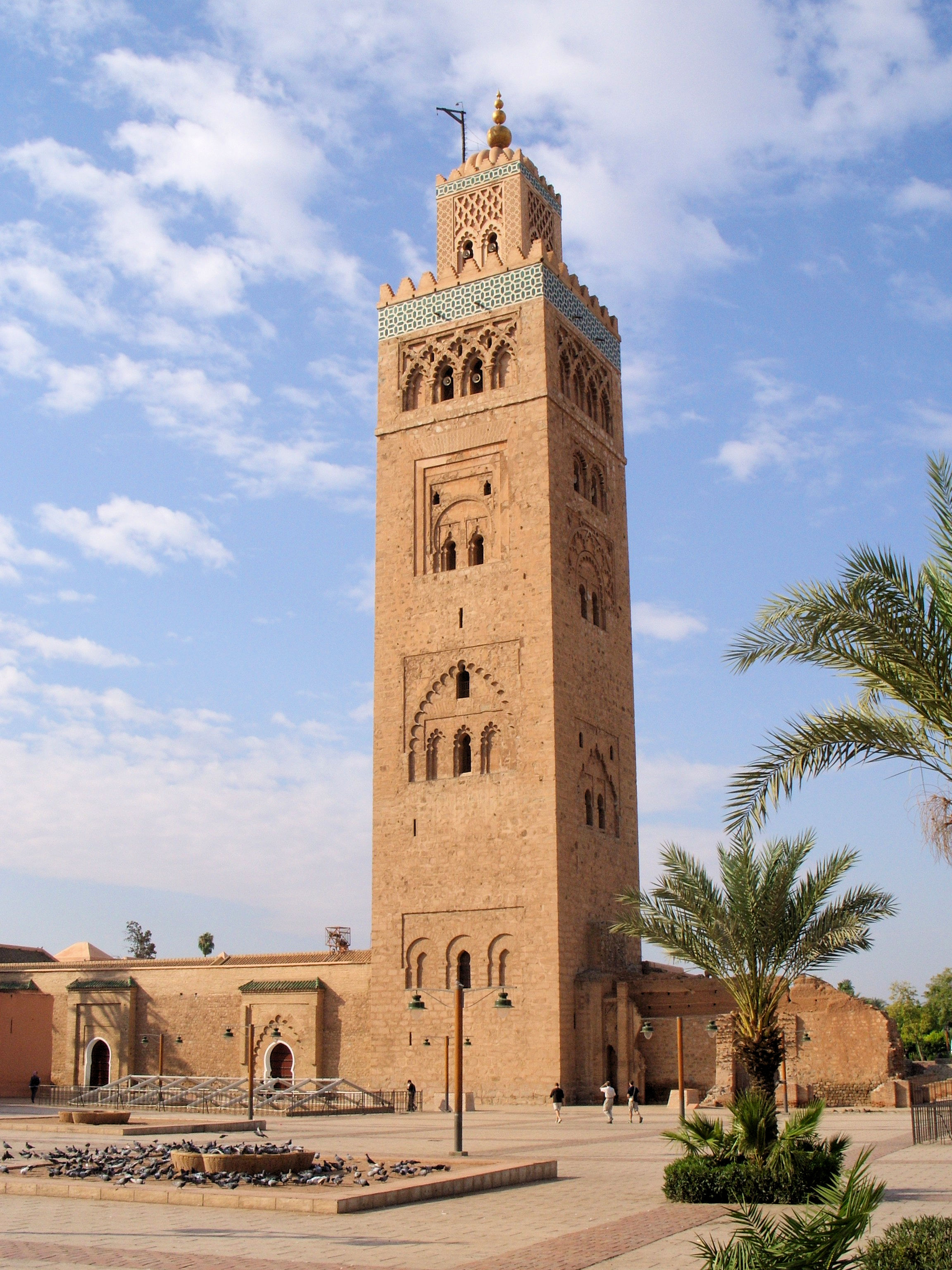
Kutubiyya Mosque at 77 m (253 ft)

Early tall buildings were similar to the record-setting Egyptian pyramid structures. In 1400 BC the 70 m (230 ft) ziggurat of Dur-Kurigalzu was constructed in Mesopotamia, and in 601 BC the Etemenanki ziggurat of Babylon (91 m (299 ft)) followed. The 70 m (230 ft) La Danta of El Mirador (Guatemala) and the 73 m (240 ft) Amaravati Stupa of Amaravati (India) were constructed in around 300 BC.

The Lighthouse of Alexandria in Egypt had a height of between 103 and 118 m (338 and 387 ft) and existed between the 3rd century BC and 14th century AD.

The Pantheon in Rome, finished in the early 2nd century AD, has an ancient Roman height record from floor to top of 43.45 m (142.6 ft), which exactly corresponds to the diameter of its interior space and was only slightly surpassed by the Pont du Gard structure. The Hagia Sophia, built in AD 537 in Constantinople, reaches a height of 55 m (180 ft).

The ancient Kushan stupa of Kanishka, located in the present-day Pakistan, near Peshawar, completed around AD 200, had a height of between 120 and 170 m (390 and 560 ft). The Chinese explorer Xuanzhang described it as the tallest building in the world in his book Records of the western Region. The Sri Lankan Jetavanaramaya stupa, constructed in the 3rd century, measured 122 m (400 ft) from its construction until the 11th century. Its current height is 71 m (233 ft).

Another short-lived structure was the 6th-century wooden Yongning Pagoda with a height of about 137 m (449 ft) to 155 m (509 ft) in Luoyang, China.

Hwangnyongsa, or Hwangnyong Temple, and sometimes spelled Hwangryongsa, is a former Buddhist temple in the city of Gyeongju, South Korea. Completed in the 7th century, the enormous nine-storey structure was built entirely of interlocking timbers with no iron nails. It had a standing total height of 68 to 80 m (223 to 262 ft), making it the tallest structure in East Asia and the tallest wooden structure in the world at the time of its construction. It was destroyed by invading Mongol forces in 1238.

In the 8th century, two seven-storied pagodas with a height of 100 m (330 ft) were constructed at Todaiｰji (東大寺) in Nara, Japan. They were one of the tallest wooden buildings in the world at the time. By the 14th century, both were burned down by fires caused by war or lightning strikes.

The Liaodi Pagoda (Kaiyuan Temple Tower) was completed in 1055 and is 83.7 m (275 ft) tall. It is still standing.

In 1057, the 50–100 m (165–330 ft; sources differ) wooden Shwesandaw Pagoda of Bagan, Myanmar, was constructed.

The Vimana of the Brihadisvara Temple, Thanjavur, Tamil Nadu, completed in 1010 is 66 m (217 ft) tall, slightly taller and older than Angkor Wat, Cambodia. The entire complex is built of granite.

The 77 m (253 ft) minaret of Koutoubia Mosque in Marrakesh, Morocco, includes a spire and orbs. It was completed under the reign of the Berber Almohad Caliph Yaqub al-Mansur around 1195. The minaret of Isa in the Umayyad Mosque was most likely originally built in the 9th century and also had a height of 77 m (253 ft).

The eastern spires of the Romanesque Speyer Cathedral, completed in 1106, reach a height of 71.3 m (234 ft). The still-standing Torre Asinelli, completed some time before 1185, was originally 70 m (230 ft) tall, later raised to 92 m (302 ft). Malmesbury Abbey was built in 1180 and reached a height of 131 m (430 ft).

=== Churches and cathedrals: tallest buildings between the 13th and 20th centuries ===
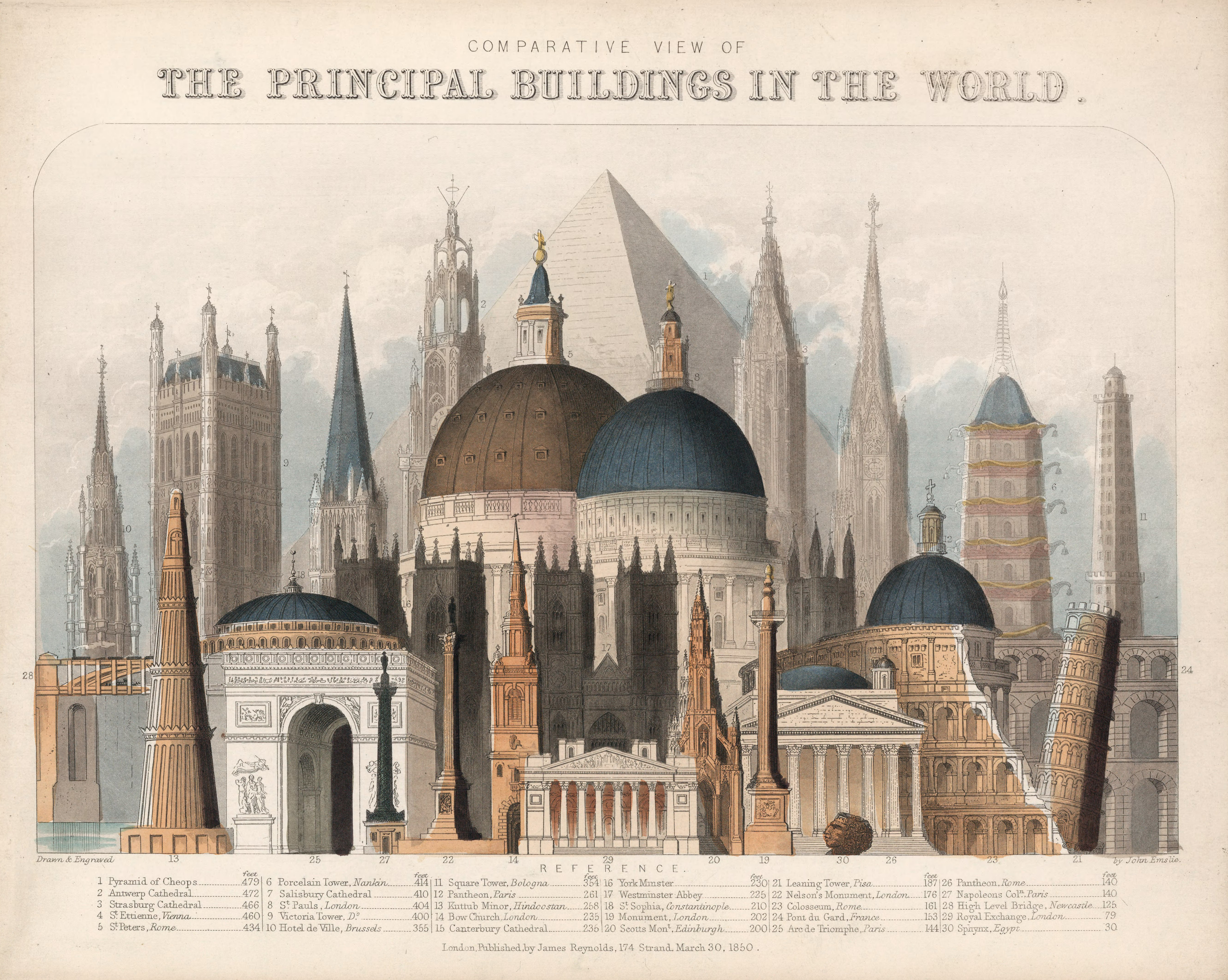
An 1850 comparison of the height of 30 notable world structures

The world's tallest structures were churches or cathedrals from the 13th/14th century until 1884, and buildings until the beginning of the 20th century. The Old St Paul's Cathedral (149 m (489 ft)) in London and Lincoln Cathedral (160 m (520 ft)) both surpassed not only any older tallest building, but also the tallest structures until then, the Pyramids. They were constructed from the 12th century, reaching completion and their maximum height in the 1310s (1314 and 1311 respectively). Lincoln Cathedral's spire collapsed in 1549, and its previous height was not surpassed elsewhere for a long time. St. Mary's Church in Stralsund became the world's tallest building after the collapse of the Lincoln spire. The 153 m (502 ft) central tower of St. Pierre's Cathedral in Beauvais was tallest from 1569 until it collapsed in 1573, making St. Mary's the tallest once again. In 1647, the bell tower of St. Mary's burned down, making the shorter Strasbourg Cathedral the world's tallest building.

It was not until the completion of the Ulm Minster in 1890 that the world's tallest building was again also the tallest building ever constructed, surpassing the original configuration of Lincoln Cathedral.

Years as tallest	Name	Location	Height	Increase	Notes
13th century – 1311	Old St Paul's Cathedral	London	149 m (489 ft)	—	Final completion in 1314. Spire collapsed 1561
1311–1549	Lincoln Cathedral	Lincoln	159.7 m (524 ft)	7.2%	Tallest building ever until 1890. Spire collapsed 1549
1549–1569	St. Mary's Church	Stralsund	151 m (495 ft)	−5.4%	
1569–1573	St. Pierre's Cathedral	Beauvais	153 m (502 ft)	1.3%	Tower collapsed 1573
1573–1647	St. Mary's Church	Stralsund	151 m (495 ft)	−1.3%	Bell tower burned down in 1647
1647–1874	Cathedral of Our Lady of Strasbourg	Strasbourg	142 m (466 ft)	−6.0%	
1874–1876	Church of St. Nicholas	Hamburg	147 m (482 ft)	3.5%	
1876–1880	Rouen Cathedral	Rouen	151 m (495 ft)	2.7%	
1880–1890	Cologne Cathedral	Cologne	157.38 m (516.3 ft)	4.2%	Tallest structure Washington Monument from 1884
1890–1894	Ulm Minster	Ulm	161.53 m (530.0 ft)	2.6%	Tallest structure Eiffel Tower from 1889

The 159.7 m (524 ft) height of Lincoln Cathedral is disputed by some, but accepted by most sources. The completion date for the spire is given as 1311 rather than 1300 by some sources. Also the 149 m (489 ft) height of the spire of Old St Paul's Cathedral, destroyed by lightning in 1561, is disputed, for example by Christopher Wren (1632–1723), who suggested a height of 140 m (460 ft).

==== Turn of the century ====
In 1890, Ulm Minster became the tallest church ever built, but it was the last church to claim the position of tallest building, which eventually went to the Philadelphia City Hall in 1894, the first skyscraper taller than 150 m (490 ft) (or, depending on definition, the Mole Antonelliana in 1889).

Among all structures, in 1884 the 169 m (554 ft) Washington Monument had already overtaken the long-standing record held by churches. But five years later in 1889 it was significantly surpassed by the Eiffel Tower, which reached completely new heights at 300 m (980 ft) (its 24 m (79 ft) antennas were added after 1957), opening up the era of supertall skyscrapers, whose heights were only reached by the pinnacle of the Chrysler Building (319 m (1,047 ft)) in 1930 and fully overtaken by the Empire State Building in 1931.

== Tallest structures since the 20th century ==
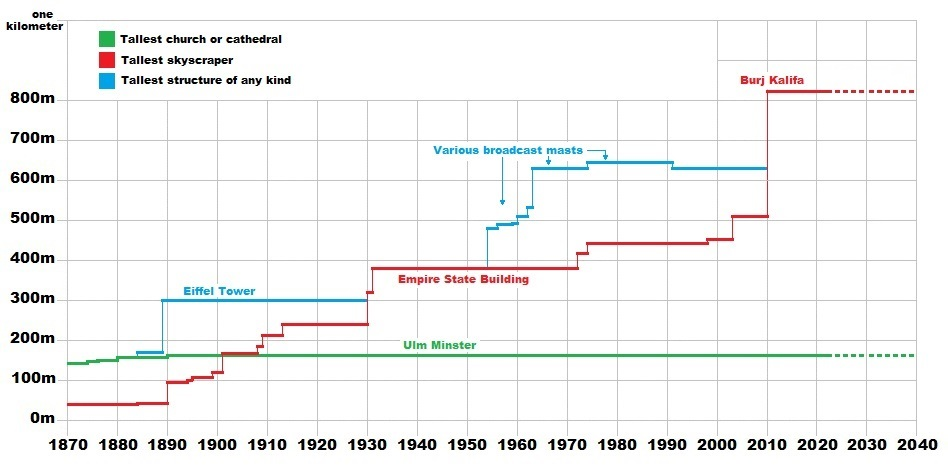
A history of the world's tallest buildings

Since the completion of the Washington Monument in Washington, D.C., in 1884, the world's tallest structure has generally not simultaneously been the world's tallest building. The exception is 1930 through 1954 when the Eiffel Tower in Paris was surpassed by the Chrysler Building in 1930, and in 1931 the Chrysler Building was surpassed by the Empire State Building, which was later surpassed by a succession of structures, starting with the Griffin Television Tower in Oklahoma. The CN Tower in Toronto, Canada held the record for the world's tallest free-standing structure for 32 years from 1975 until 2007 when it was surpassed by Burj Khalifa, and was the world's tallest tower until 2009 when it was surpassed by Canton Tower.

Since the completion of the Burj Khalifa in 2010, it is the world's tallest building and world's tallest structure of any kind.

== Skyscrapers: tallest buildings since 1908 ==
Since the completion of the first skyscraper taller than 150 m (490 ft) (depending on the definition of skyscraper, 1894 with the Philadelphia City Hall or 1908 with the Singer Building), skyscrapers have consistently been the tallest buildings.

=== High-rise blocks and early skyscrapers ===
Before skyscrapers, tower blocks reached at various times and locations heights of 30 m (98 ft) (as in the city of Shibam) or even up to 100 m (330 ft) among the Towers of Bologna. Buildings that have been specifically called the first skyscrapers include:

- E. V. Haughwout Building, 24 m (79 ft) tall, 5 floors, first use of a passenger elevator, built in 1857
- Equitable Life Building, at least 40 m (130 ft) tall, 9 floors, built in 1870
- New York Tribune Building, 79 m (259 ft) tall, 9 floors, built in 1875, expanded in 1907 to 19 floors
- Montauk Building, 40 m (130 ft) tall, 10 floors, built in 1883
- Home Insurance Building, 42 m (138 ft) tall, 12 floors, built in 1885
- Lancashire Insurance Building, 10 floors, built in 1890
- Manhattan Building in Chicago, 68.3 m (224 ft) tall, 16 floors, built in 1891
- Monadnock Building, 66 m (217 ft) tall, 17 floors, built in 1891

Later record-setting early skyscrapers include:

- New York World Building, 94 m (308 ft), 1890
- Manhattan Life Insurance Building, 106 m (348 ft), 1894

=== The height of skyscrapers ===
Comparison of the vanity height as defined as the difference between the pinnacle height and the height to the floor of the highest occupied top floor of some buildings that have at one point registered as the world's tallest

After the construction of the first skyscraper taller than 150 m (490 ft), depending on definition the Philadelphia City Hall in 1894 or the Singer Building in 1908, the incrementation in the height category of supertall skyscrapers began with the construction of the Chrysler Building, followed by the Empire State Building, in New York City. The Chrysler Building was the first building in the world to break the 300 m (980 ft) barrier, and the Empire State Building was the first building to have more than 100 floors. It stands at 381 m (1,250 ft) and has 102 floors. The next tallest skyscraper was the World Trade Center, which was completed in 1971. The North Tower was 417 m (1,368 ft) and the South Tower 415 m (1,362 ft) tall. It surpassed the height of the Empire State Building by 36 m (118 ft). Two years later the Sears Tower was built in Chicago, standing at 442 m (1,450 ft) with 110 floors, surpassing the height of the World Trade Center by 25 m (82 ft). Counting the Petronas Towers' antenna spires yet discounting the Sears Tower's antennae, the former rose 10 meters above the latter, standing at a height of 452 m (1,483 ft) and each having 88 floors.

In 2004, the construction of Taipei 101 brought the height of skyscrapers to a new level, standing at 508 m (1,667 ft) with 101 floors. It is 59 m (194 ft) taller than the previous record-holders, the Petronas Towers. Burj Khalifa surpassed the height of Taipei 101 by 319 m (1,047 ft) in 2009, making it 60% taller. It has broken several skyscraper records, and it is almost twice as tall as the Empire State Building. Burj Khalifa, however has not broken the record of world's tallest structure. In 2009, Guinness World Records recognised the Magnolia oil platform as the tallest structure. It has a record-breaking height of 1,432 metres (4,698 feet). However the majority of the Burj Khalifa's height difference (29%) is gained from vanity height, the Burj Khalifa's highest occupiable floor is only 585 m (1,919 ft) above ground. This would still make it the tallest building in the world but only by 2 meters over the Shanghai Tower, a substantially smaller margin than before.

- Note: The CTBUH defines a building as a supertall if it is 300 m (980 ft) or taller. The CTBUH defines a building as a megatall if it is 600 m (1970 ft) or taller.

=== Supertall and megatall skyscrapers by location ===
Since the early skyscraper boom that took place in North America, the significant number of skyscrapers in North America dominated the 100 tallest buildings in the world. In 1930, 99 of the 100 tallest buildings in the world were in North America. In the future, this percentage is expected to decline to only 22 percent. The predominance of skyscrapers in North America is decreasing because of skyscraper construction in other parts of the world, especially in Asia. In Asia, there has been an increase in the number of supertall skyscrapers beginning with the completion of the Bank of China Tower in Hong Kong in 1990. Currently, sixty of the world's 100 tallest buildings are in Asia (including the Middle East), while all six megatall skyscrapers reside in Asia. All proposed future megatall skyscrapers are also in Asia with the exception of the Lakhta Center 2 in St. Petersburg.

=== Skyscrapers ===
Since the skyscraper era began, the great majority of skyscrapers were used predominantly as office space. From 1930 to 2000, the percentage of office towers never fell below 86 percent, but in the future it is expected to be as low as 46 percent. By 2010, fewer than half of the 100 tallest buildings in the world were office towers, the majority being for residential and mixed use. Only four of the ten tallest buildings in the world, and twenty-eight of the top fifty, were used primarily as offices.

A mixed-use tall building is defined as having two or more functions that occupy a significant proportion of the tower's total space.^{[A]} Support areas such as car parks and mechanical plant space do not contribute towards mixed-use status.

Skyscrapers used primarily or exclusively as hotels or residential space are generally shorter than office and mixed-use buildings, with only a few supertall buildings of the residential or hotel types among the 100 tallest skyscrapers. The tallest completed residential buildings (minimum 85% residential) are Central Park Tower, 111 West 57th Street, and 432 Park Avenue, all on Billionaire's Row in New York City. The tallest completed hotels (primarily hotel space) are the Gevora Hotel, the JW Marriott Marquis Dubai twin towers, the Rose Tower, and the Burj Al Arab, all in Dubai.

== List of historically tallest skyscrapers ==
The following list of tallest buildings is based on the default metric of CTBUH, that of measuring to the highest architectural element. Other criteria would generate a different list. Shanghai World Financial Center is not on the above list, but it surpassed Taipei 101 in 2008 to become the building with the highest occupied floor. Using the criterion of highest tip (including antennae), the World Trade Center in New York City was the world's tallest building from 1971 to 1973, until the Willis Tower in Chicago (which already had a higher occupied floor than the World Trade Center) had its antenna extended to give that building the world's tallest tip, a title it held until the 2010 completion of Burj Khalifa. Petronas Towers and Taipei 101 were never the world's tallest buildings by the highest-tip criterion.

Years as tallest	Name	City	Country	Constructed	Opened	Current status	Height	Increase	Title held (years)
1894–1908	Philadelphia City Hall	Philadelphia	United States	1871–1901	1894	Standing	167 m (548 ft)	—	14
1908–1909	Singer Building	New York City	United States	1906–1908	1908	Demolished (1967–1969)	192 m (630 ft)	15%	1
1909–1913	Metropolitan Life Tower	New York City	United States	1905–1909	1909	Standing	213 m (699 ft)	11%	4
1913–1930	Woolworth Building	New York City	United States	1910–1912	1913	Standing	241 m (791 ft)	13%	17
1930	40 Wall Street	New York City	United States	1929–1930	1930	Standing	283 m (928 ft)	17%	<1
1930–1931	Chrysler Building	New York City	United States	1928-1930	1930	Standing	318.9 m (1,046 ft)	13%	1
1931–1970	Empire State Building	New York City	United States	1930-1931	1931	Standing	381 m (1,250 ft)	19%	39
1970–1973	1 World Trade Center	New York City	United States	1966–1973	1973	Destroyed (2001)	417 m (1,368 ft)	9%	3
1973–1998	Sears Tower	Chicago	United States	1970–1974	1973	Standing	442 m (1,450 ft)	6%	25
1998–2004	Petronas Towers	Kuala Lumpur	Malaysia	1993–1998	1999	Standing	452 m (1,483 ft)	2%	6
2004–2010	Taipei 101	Taipei	Taiwan	1998–2004	2004	Standing	510 m (1,670 ft)	13%	6
2010–present	Burj Khalifa	Dubai	United Arab Emirates	2004–2010	2010	Standing	828 m (2,717 ft)	62%	16

== See also ==
- List of tallest buildings
- List of tallest structures
- History of the world's tallest structures
- Tallest structures by category

== Notes ==
A. This significant proportion can be judged as 15% or greater of either the total floor area, or the total building height in terms of number of floors occupied for the function. However, care should be taken in the case of supertall buildings. For example, a 20-story hotel function as part of a 150-story tower does not comply with the 15% rule, though this would clearly constitute mixed use.
