= Towers of Bologna =

Medieval structures in Bologna, Italy

Coordinates: 44.4943°N 11.3465°E

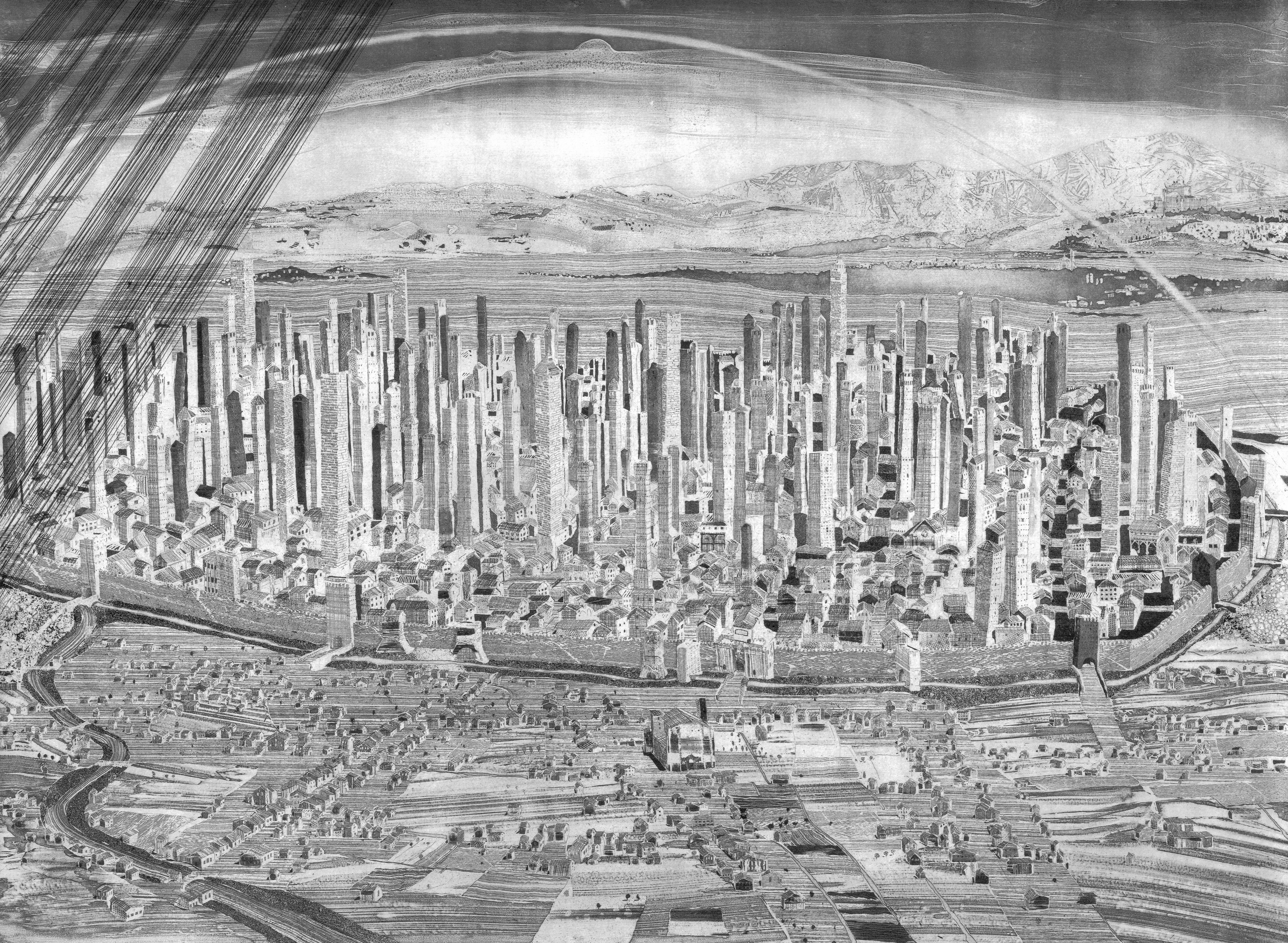
Medieval Bologna, full of towers, as imagined by modern engraver Toni Pecoraro (b. 1958, Agrigento, Sicily).

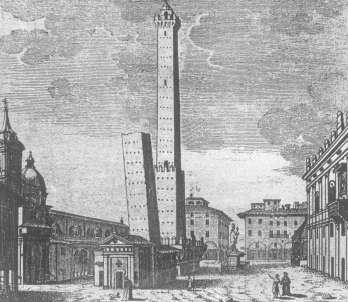
The Two Towers (Pio Panfili 1767)

The Towers of Bologna are a group of medieval structures in Bologna, Italy. The two most prominent ones remaining, known as the Two Towers, are a landmark of the city.

== History ==
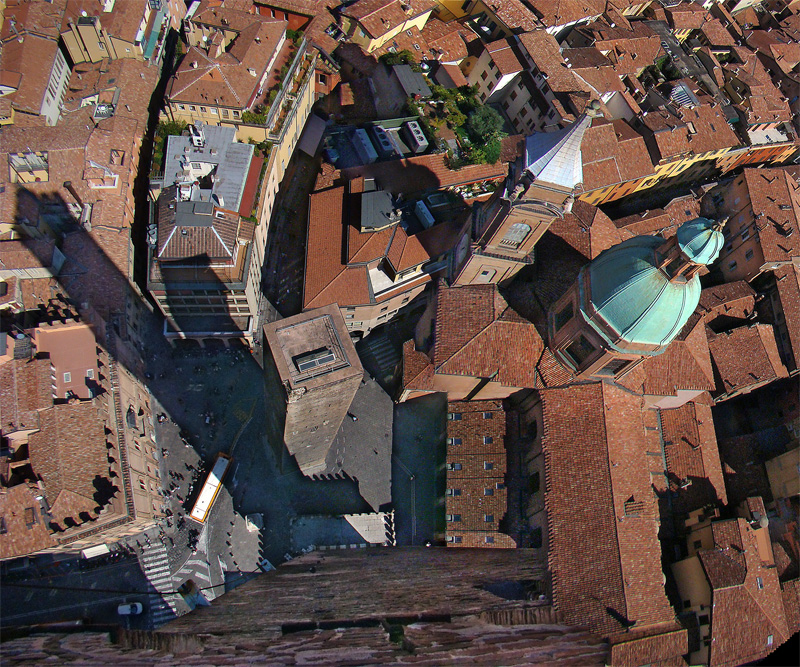
Piazza Ravegnana viewed from the top of the Asinelli Tower.

In the 12th and the 13th century, Bologna was a city full of towers. Almost all were tall—the highest being 97 metres (318.2 ft)—defensive stone towers. Besides the towers, there are still some fortified gateways (torresotti) that correspond to the gates of the 12th-century city wall (Mura dei torresotti or Cerchia dei Mille), which itself has been almost completely destroyed.

The reasons for the construction of so many towers are not clear. One hypothesis is that the richest families used them for offensive/defensive purposes during the period of the Investiture Controversy.

In the 13th century, many towers were taken down or demolished, and others simply collapsed. Several have since subsequently been used in one way or another: as prisons, city towers, shops, or residential buildings. Still, the towers remained a famous sight of Bologna throughout the later periods; even Dante mentioned some of the towers in his Inferno. The last demolitions took place during the 20th century, according to an ambitious, but retrospectively unfortunate, restructuring plan for the city; the Artenisi Tower and the Riccadonna Tower at the Mercato di mezzo were demolished in 1917.

Fewer than twenty towers can still be seen in today's Bologna. Among the remaining ones are the Azzoguidi Tower, also called Altabella (with a height of 61 metres (200 ft)), the Prendiparte Tower, called Coronata (60 metres (200 ft)), the Scappi Tower (39 metres (128 ft)), Uguzzoni Tower (32 metres (105 ft)), Guidozagni Tower, Galluzzi Tower, and the famous Two Towers: the Asinelli Tower (97 metres (318 ft)) and the Garisenda Tower (48 metres (157 ft)).

== Construction ==
The construction of the towers was quite onerous. To build a typical tower with a height of 60 m would have required between three and ten years of work.

Each tower had a square cross-section with foundations between five and ten meters deep, reinforced by poles hammered into the ground and covered with pebble and lime. The tower's base was made of big blocks of selenite stone. The remaining walls became successively thinner and lighter the higher the structure was raised, and were realised in so-called "a sacco" masonry: with a thick inner wall and a thinner outer wall, with the gap being filled with stones and mortar.

Usually, some holes were left in the outer wall as well as bigger hollows in the selenite to support scaffoldings and to allow for later coverings and constructions, generally on the basis of wood.

== Number and ownership ==
The towers heavily crowded medieval Bologna, and there has been considerable debate among historians regarding their peak number before the first ones were demolished or reduced to avoid collapse.

The first scholar to study the towers in a systematic way was Count Giovanni Gozzadini, a 19th-century senator of the Kingdom of Italy, who intensively researched the city's medieval archives. Based on his analysis of civic real estate deeds, contracts, and property changes, Gozzadini arrived at the extraordinary estimate of 180 towers within the city walls.

Modern historiography has pointed out that Gozzadini's methodology led to multiple counts of the same physical structures. In medieval Bologna, towers were often owned by complex family consortiums (consorterie) rather than single individuals. When noble clans or rural lords from the surrounding contado moved into the city, they frequently purchased shares of existing towers or case-torri, causing the buildings to be referred to by entirely different family names in legal deeds depending on the owners at that specific moment. Documented examples of this practice include urban properties and towers associated over time with various regional lineages, such as the Lambertini, the Nordigli, and the Biancuzzi family of Medicina. Recent estimates have therefore reduced the actual total number of towers to between 80 and 100, highlighting that not all of them coexisted at the same historical period.

== Two Towers ==
The most famous pair of towers are located at the intersection of the roads that lead to the five gates of the old ring wall (mura dei torresotti). This was the site of the early medieval Gate to the Via Emilia, the Porta Ravennate, now remembered by the name of the adjacent Piazza di Porta Ravegnana. The taller tower is called the Asinelli while the smaller but more leaning tower is called the Garisenda.

The Asinelli Tower was built between 1109 and 1119 by the Asinelli family. At 97 m tall, there are 498 steps inside.

The Garisenda Tower is shorter at 47 m and is known for its steep overhang due to subsidence of the foundations.

In October 2023, due to fears that the heavily leaning Garisenda Tower would collapse, both towers were closed to the public. In December 2023 the municipality of Bologna launched a crowdfunding campaign to restore the site, with the mayor of Bologna estimating that the project would take 10 years and cost €20 million.

== List of the still existing towers and gateways ==
=== Towers ===
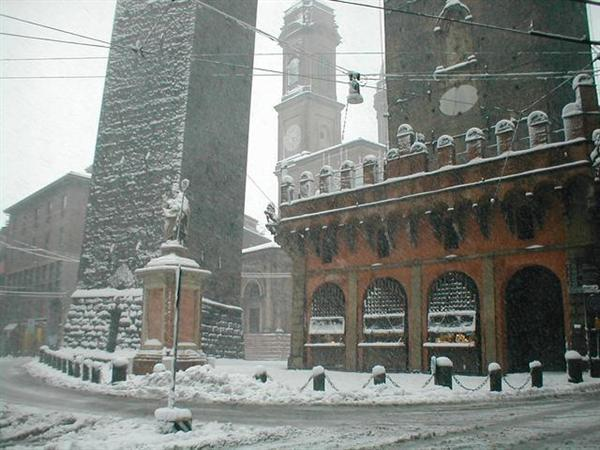
The towers and the statue of Saint Petronius covered with snow.

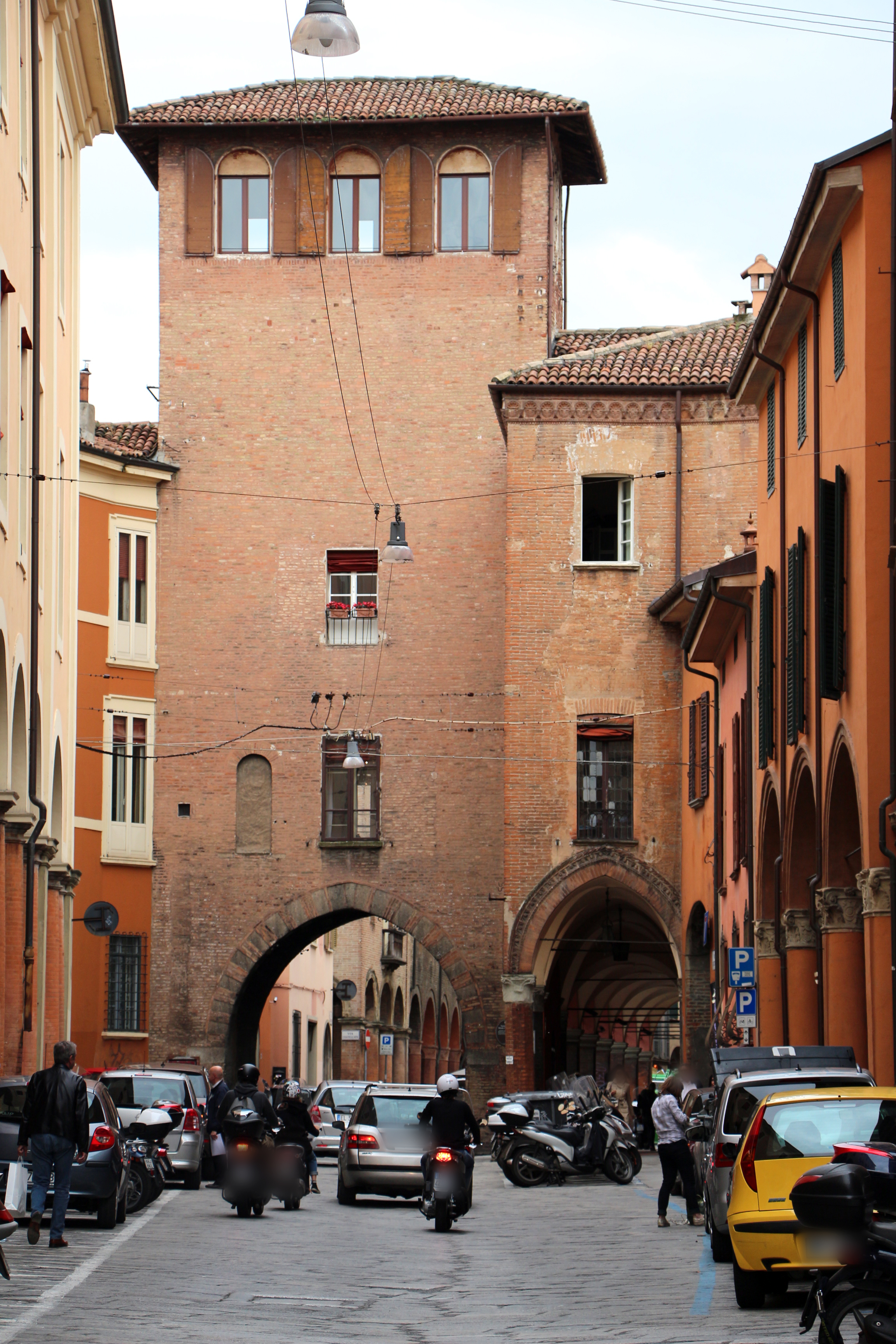
The Castiglione Gateway

The following list comprises the surviving and historically documented medieval towers and case-torri surveyed in the historical center of Bologna.

- Accursi Tower (Torre Accursi or Torre dell'orologio) – Piazza Maggiore
- Agresti Tower (Torre Agresti) – Piazza Galileo
- Alberici Tower (Torre Alberici) – Via S. Stefano – P.zza della Mercanzia
- Arengo Tower (Torre dell'Arengo) – Piazza Maggiore
- Asinelli Tower (Torre degli Asinelli) – Piazza Ravegnana, 82
- Azzoguidi Tower (Torre Azzoguidi or Torre Altabella) – Via Altabella, 7
- Bertolotti-Clarissimi Tower (Torre Bertolotti-Clarissimi) – Via Farini, 11
- Biancucci Tower (Torre dei Biancucci da Medicina) – Strada Maggiore, 6 (engulfed case-torre, formerly owned by the Prendiparte)
- Carrari Tower (Torre Carrari) – Via Marchesana
- Catalani Tower (Torre Catalani) – Vicolo Spirito Santo
- Conoscenti Tower (Torre Conoscenti) – Via Manzoni, 6 (cortile del Museo Civico Medioevale)
- Galluzzi Tower (Torre Galluzzi) – Corte Galluzzi
- Garisenda Tower (Torre Garisenda) – Piazza Ravegnana
- Ghisilieri Tower (Torre Ghisilieri) – Via Nazario Sauro
- Guidozagni Tower (Torre Guidozagni) – Via Albiroli 1–3
- Lambertini Tower (Torre Lambertini) – Piazza Re Enzo
- Lapi Tower (Torre Lapi) – Via IV Novembre
- Oseletti Tower (Torre Oseletti) – Strada Maggiore, 34–36
- Prendiparte Tower (Torre Prendiparte or Torre Coronata) – Via S. Alò, 7
- Scappi Tower (Torre Scappi) – Via Indipendenza, 1
- Toschi Tower (Torre Toschi) – P.zza Minghetti dietro Casa Policardi
- Uguzzoni Tower (Torre Uguzzoni) – Vicolo Mandria, 1

=== Gateways ===
- Castiglione Gateway (Torresotto di Castiglione) – Via Castiglione, 47
- Piella Gateway (Torresotto dei Piella, or Porta Govese or del Mercato) – Via Piella, via Bertiera
- Porta Nuova Gateway (Torresotto di porta Nuova or del Pratello) – Via Porta Nuova, via M. Finzi
- San Vitale Gateway (Torresotto di San Vitale) – Via S. Vitale, 56

== Descriptions of the Towers by Dante Alighieri ==
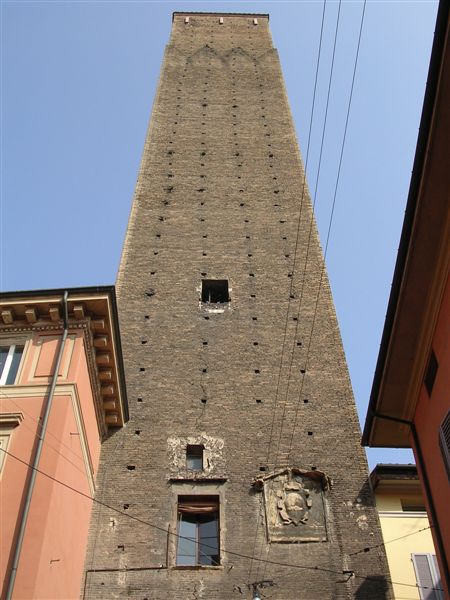
The Prendiparte Tower

Never can my eyes make amends to me—short
of going blind—for their great fault,
that they gazed at the Garisenda tower
with its fine view, and—confound them!—
missed her, the worthiest of those
who are talked about.

— Rime, VIII

== See also ==
- List of tallest structures built before the 20th century
- San Gimignano and Pavia – two other Italian cities where high towers were built in medieval times for family rivalries
- Liber Paradisus
