= Biancuzzi =

Historic Italian noble family

- Consorteria / Urban nobility
- Current region: Bologna, Romagna
- Origin: Medicina
- Titles: Cattani di Medicina
- Estate: Torre dei da Medicina (Porta Ravegnana)

The Biancuzzi family (also spelled Biancucci, de Blanchucijs, or historically known by the toponymic designation da Medicina / Cattani da Medicina) is an ancient Ghibelline aristocratic family and consorteria active in the political, military, academic, and legal landscape of Bologna and Medicina between the 12th and 15th centuries, with subsequent branches extending into the Early Modern period.

== History ==
=== Origins and Feudal Roots ===
The origins of the family are closely tied to the fortified borough of Medicina in the Bolognese countryside, where they held seigneurial rights under the title of "Cattani" (captains or feudal lords). To distinguish themselves from other branches of the lineage as they integrated into the urban nobility of Bologna, the branch of Petricciolo da Medicina adopted the surname de Blanchucijs (Biancuzzi), as documented in a notarial deed dated July 12, 1290, regarding the alienation of real estate properties near Porta Ravegnana.

The integration of the family into the civic and institutional fabric of the medieval Commune of Bologna is documented from the late 11th and early 12th centuries. The family established strategic marital and political alliances with prominent dynasties of the neighboring Romagna region; notably, Guido da Medicina (father of the dantesque Pier) married Adelasia, the niece of Guido da Polenta, lord of Ravenna. Another member of the house, Alberico di Guido da Medicina, served as a prominent canon and cardinal of the Metropolitan Church of Ravenna.

An academic figure of the early lineage was the jurist and glossator Pillio da Medicina, a professor of law trained in Bologna who later taught at the University of Modena, active between 1169 and 1222.

=== Tower and Urban Presence in Bologna ===
As the family achieved high economic and social status, they established their urban residence in Bologna. In 1290, Princivalle di Petrizzolo da Medicina purchased a tower and a newly constructed house near the strategic Church of San Bartolomeo di Porta Ravegnana, located next to the famous Asinelli and Garisenda towers, from the Guidotto and Guglielmo Prendiparte brothers.

Throughout the 14th and 15th centuries, members of the family continued to hold high public and military offices:

- Giacomo da Medicina: A Bolognese nobleman who served as a military captain for the Republic of Venice in the 14th century.
- Matteo da Medicina: Recorded as Anziano (Elder Consul) and councilor of the Commune of Bologna.
- Francesco di Guglielmo and Andrea di Corradino: Documented in public acts as influential citizens of Bologna.
- Nicola (Cola) da Medicina: Served as a military captain under the famed condottiero Bartolomeo Colleoni in the 15th century.
- Raffaele da Medicina: A military captain under the service of Giovanni I Bentivoglio, lord of Bologna.

=== Early Modern Period ===
In the following centuries, secondary branches of the family moved outside the immediate Bolognese territory, producing notable figures in the fields of ecclesiastical studies and humanities. During the late 16th and early 17th centuries, the Bologna-born theologian, philosopher, and orientalist Benedetto Biancuzzi (recorded in academic Latin repertories as Benedictus Blancuccius) achieved significant distinction. He later relocated to Rome, where he published influential works on Hebrew philology that are now preserved in national bio-bibliographical registries of Italian Baroque culture.

== Cultural Legacy: Dante's Inferno ==
The most prominent historical and literary figure of the family was Pietro di Aino da Medicina, universally known as Pier da Medicina, who was placed by Dante Alighieri in the ninth ditch of the Eighth Circle of Hell among the Sowers of Discord in Canto XXVIII of the Inferno (lines 64–90).

Fourteenth-century commentators on the Divine Comedy, most notably Benvenuto da Imola (writing in the 1380s), explicitly identified the character as a member of the Biancuzzi/da Medicina consorteria, recalling that Dante himself had been hosted at their court in Medicina. Benvenuto noted that by his time, no members of the original house remained resident in the town of Medicine, as the main branches had fully relocated to Bologna and other Italian regions due to political conflicts and professional appointments, such as their alliances with Venedico Caccianemici and the Lambertazzi faction. Notarial archives in Bologna trace Pietro di Aino's historical transactions up to 1277, confirming the exact chronological alignment with Dante's account.

== Heraldry ==
The family is officially registered in the historic heraldic rolls of Bologna. In the Blasone Bolognese by Floriano Canetoli (1791–1795), the coat of arms of the house is recorded and illustrated under the historic spelling variants of Biancucci or Brancucci.

The primary heraldic charge features a branca (a lion's or wild animal's claw equipped with sharp talons) displayed on an azure field, a motif traditionally associated with Ghibelline military lineages. The term branca (claw) is etymologically linked to the historic spelling variant Brancucci, which later evolved phonetically into Biancucci and Biancuzzi.

In advanced historical heraldic representations, the coat of arms incorporates additional coats of arms and ornamental achievements. These include a prominent imperial eagle—reflecting the family's allegiance to the Ghibelline faction—alongside stylized mantling and secondary crests that indicate geopolitical alliances and marriages contracted by the family's various urban branches within the Commune of Bologna and the Romagna region.

== See also ==
- Pier da Medicina
- Pillio da Medicina
- Medicina
- History of Bologna
