= Ottavio Scarlattini =

Italian mathematician and writer

Ottavio Scarlattini (1623 – 1699) was an Italian philosopher, mathematician and theologian.

== Biography ==
Ottavio Scarlattini became a Canon Regular of the Lateran at Bologna in 1639, and then he was appointed Archpriest of Villa Fontana in Medicina. Scarlattini's 1679 publication Dell'Epicuro contro gli epicurei was an 830 page treatise arguing for the beatification of Epicurus in which he defended Epicureanism as a philosophy. Translated into Latin, the work became well known across Europe. His 1683 publication L'huomo, e sue parti figurato, e simbolico, anatomico, rationale, morale, mistico, politico, e legale was a discourse on the symbolism of the parts of the human body; giving each part an anatomical, rational, moral, mystic, political, and legal analysis.

== Works ==
- Del Davide musico armato: idea dell'ottimo prencipe ecclesiastico, e secolare. Bologna: Gioseffo Longhi. 1677.
- Dell'Epicuro contro gli epicurei. Bologna: Giacomo Monti. 1679.
- L'huomo, e sue parti figurato, e simbolico, anatomico, rationale, morale, mistico, politico, e legale. Bologna: Giacomo Monti. 1683.
- Analoghe proportioni sopra il non anche risoluto problema d'Euclide per la quadratura del circolo. Bologna: Pietro Maria Monti. 1690.
