= Piazza di Porta Ravegnana, Bologna =

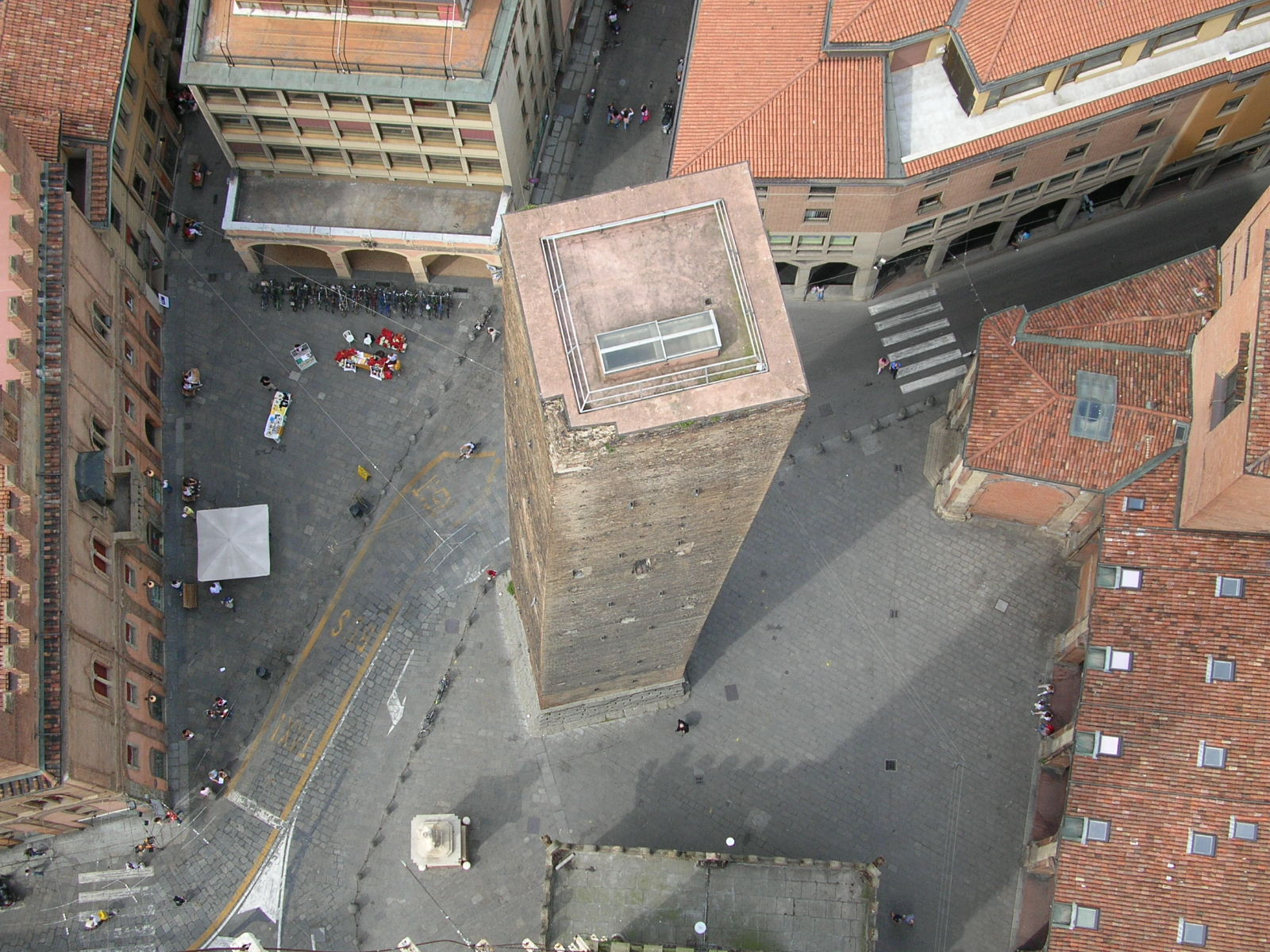
The square seen from the top of the Asinelli tower

The Piazza di Porta Ravegnana (originally Porta Ravennate) is a city square in the central of Bologna, region of Emilia-Romagna, Italy. The Piazza, located some four blocks east of the Piazza Maggiore and Cathedral of Bologna, is the site of the Two Towers of Bologna.

== History ==
The square was named for the presence nearby of the ancient city gate that led to the strada San Vitale leading to Ravenna. During the Middle Ages, an important city market took place in this square.

== Description ==
A number of major arteries converge in this square, including the Strada Maggiore, the Strada di Castiglione, via Zamboni (formerly Strada San Donato), and via de' Giudei. In addition to the towers, the square houses a 17th-century statue of St Petronius of Bologna, the patron saint of the town. Alongside the Piazza stands the church of Sants Bartolomeo and Gaetano and the Palazzo Strazzaroli, the palace of the Arte dei Drappieri, i.e. the guild of the fabric merchants.
