= Pier da Medicina =

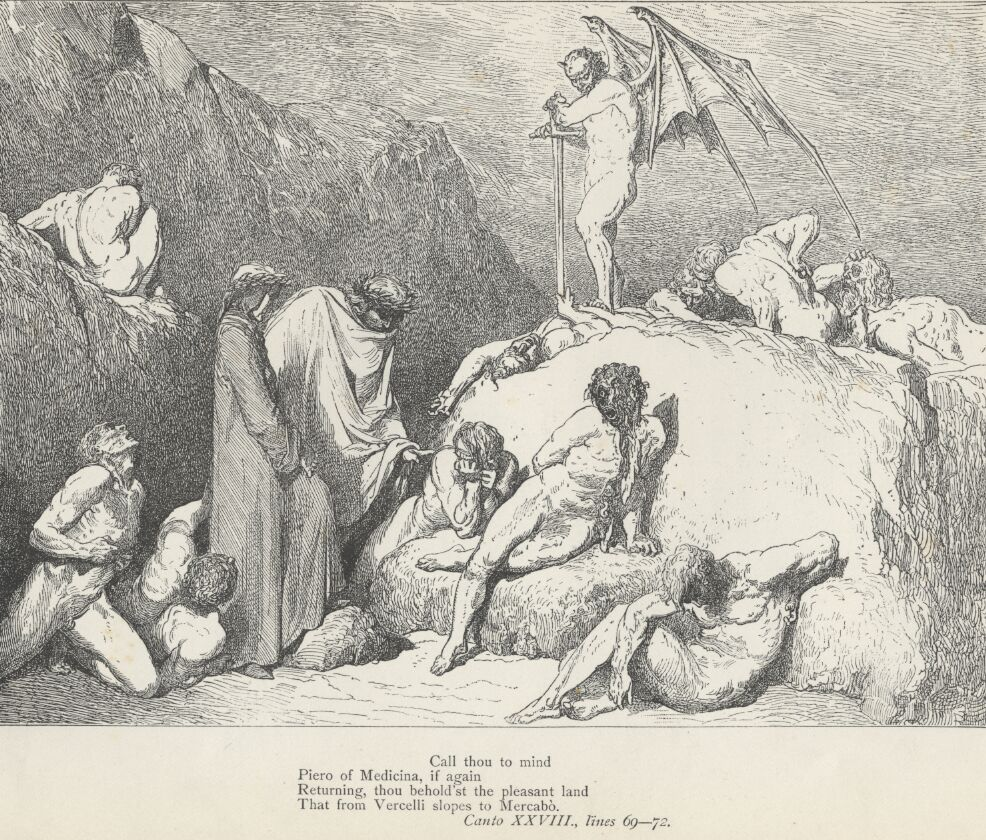
- Pier da Medicina, illustrated by Gustave Doré for Dante's Inferno.
- Born: Pietro di Aino; Medicina, Commune of Bologna
- Died: Italy
- Citizenship: Commune of Bologna
- Occupations: Politician, landowner
- Years active: 13th century (documented until 1277)
- Known for: Historical Bolognese nobleman mentioned in Dante Alighieri's Inferno
- Political party: Ghibellines

Pier da Medicina (fl. 13th century) is a historical figure from the Emilia-Romagna region who appears as a character in Dante Alighieri's Inferno.

== In the Divine Comedy ==
Dante encounters him in the ninth ditch of the Eighth Circle of Hell among the Sowers of Discord (Canto XXVIII, lines 64–90). He is depicted as horribly mutilated, with his throat pierced, his nose cut off up to the eyes, and a missing ear. Speaking through the wound in his neck, he asks Dante to remember him if the poet ever returns to the Romagnol plains and the town of Medicina. He then predicts the violent death of Guido del Cassero and Angiolello da Carignano at the hands of the tyrant Malatestino I Malatesta, before forcibly opening the mouth of a nearby shade to show Dante that its tongue has been cut out, identifying him as Curione.

== Historical identity ==
Fourteenth-century commentators on the Divine Comedy, most notably Benvenuto da Imola, recorded that Pier accumulated wealth and political influence by fostering discord and rivalries among the urban elites of the Commune of Bologna, neighboring Signorie, and the city of Florence. Benvenuto also claimed that Dante had personally been hosted at the court of the Cattani (lords) of Medicina.

Modern archival and genealogical research has identified the character with Pietro di Aino da Medicina, a member of the prominent Biancuzzi aristocratic family and consorteria. Notarial archives in Bologna trace his historical transactions up to 1277, confirming his chronological alignment with Dante's account. By the late 14th century, the family had fully relocated its main branches into the urban core of Bologna.
