= Lambertini =

Lambertini is an Italian surname that may refer to the following notable people:

- The Blessed Imelda Lambertini (1322–1333), patroness of First Holy Communicants
- 175629 Lambertini, a minor planet discovered in 2007 by F. Tozzi and M. Graziani
- Prospero Lambertini (1675–1758), Italian Cardinal elected Pope under the name Benedict XIV
- Attilio Lambertini (1920–2002), Italian racing cyclist
- Egano Righi-Lambertini (1906–2000), Italian Roman Catholic cardinal and Vatican diplomat
- Marta Lambertini (1937–2019), Argentine composer
- Luisa Lambertini (born 1963), Italian economist specializing in monetary and fiscal policies
- Michele di Matteo Lambertini (active 1447–1469), Italian painter active in Bologna
- Vincenzo Lambertini (born 1970), Italian footballer
