= Vincenzo Lambertini =

Italian footballer

Personal information
- Date of birth: 7 May 1970 (age 56)
- Place of birth: Molfetta, Italy
- Height: 1.80 m (5 ft 11 in)
- Position: Defender

Senior career*
Years	Team	Apps	(Gls)
1988–1992	Bisceglie	98	(4)
1992–1993	Licata	37	(0)
1993–1995	Siracusa	49	(0)
1995–1996	Brescia	10	(0)
1996–1997	Casarano	21	(8)
1997–1998	Cagliari	11	(0)
1998–2000	Pescara	50	(2)
2000–2001	Pistoiese	55	(3)
2001–2005	Chieti	52	(2)
2005–2007	Montesilvano	36	(7)
2007	Hatria	7	(0)
2007–2008	Notaresco	11	(1)
2008–2009	Silvi	22	(5)
Total		459	(32)

Managerial career
- 2012–2015: Pescara (youth)
- 2015–2017: Caldora
- 2022: Bisceglie (assistant)
- 2022–2023: Fasano (assistant)
- 2023–: Audace Cerignola (assistant)
- * Club domestic league appearances and goals as of 16 November 2024

Vincenzo Lambertini (born 7 May 1970), is an Italian former professional footballer who played as a defender.

== Career ==
A defender, Lambertini was revealed by Bisceglie in 1988, and became famous playing for Serie B clubs during the 1990s, especially for Brescia, Cagliari and Pescara.

After retiring as a player, Lambertini worked as a coach in the youth sectors at Pescara, at Caldora, and was an assistant at Bisceglie, at Fasano, and at Audace Cerignola, where he is currently.
