= Petronius of Bologna =

Bishop of Bologna and patron saint of the city

Saint Petronius
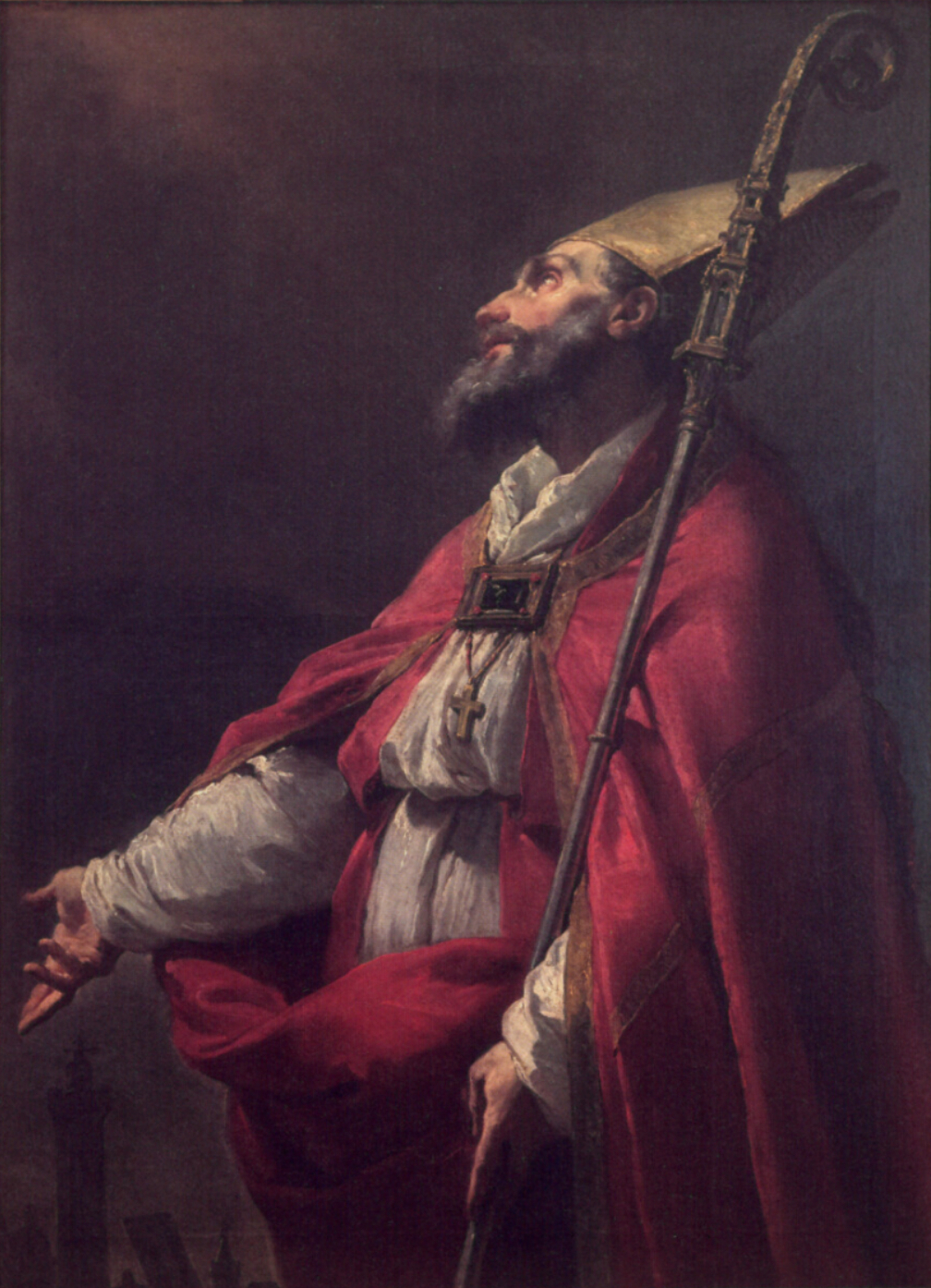
- Born: Unknown
- Died: ca. 450 AD
- Venerated in: All Christianity
- Major shrine: Basilica di San Petronio, Bologna, Italy.
- Feast: 4 October
- Attributes: Depicted as a bishop holding a model of Bologna in his hand
- Patronage: Bologna

Petronius (Italian: Petronio) (died ca. 450 AD) was bishop of Bologna during the fifth century. He is a patron saint of the city. Born of a noble Roman family, he became a convert to Christianity and subsequently a priest. As bishop of Bologna, he built the Church of Santo Stefano.

== Life ==
The only sources on Petronius are a letter written by Bishop Eucherius of Lyon (died 450–455) to Valerianus, and Gennadius' De viris illustribus. Eucherius describes Petronius as renowned in Italy for his virtues. Gennadius writes that Petronius belonged to a noble family whose members occupied high positions at the imperial Court at Milan and in the provincial administrations at the end of the fourth and the beginning of the fifth centuries.

His father (also named Petronius) was probably praefectus praetorio, since a Petronius filled this office in Gaul in 402–408. The treatise De ordinatione episcopi, bearing the name of Petronius as author, is by the elder Petronius. Eucherius seems to suggest that the future bishop also held an important secular position.

Even in his youth Petronius devoted himself to the practices of asceticism, and seems to have visited Jerusalem, perhaps on a pilgrimage.

About 432 he was elected and consecrated Bishop of Bologna, where he erected a church to Saint Stephen (Santo Stefano), the building scheme of which was in imitation of the shrines on Golgotha and over the Holy Sepulchre in Jerusalem. He also built the church of Santa Lucia, and the original church of Santi Bartolomeo e Gaetano.

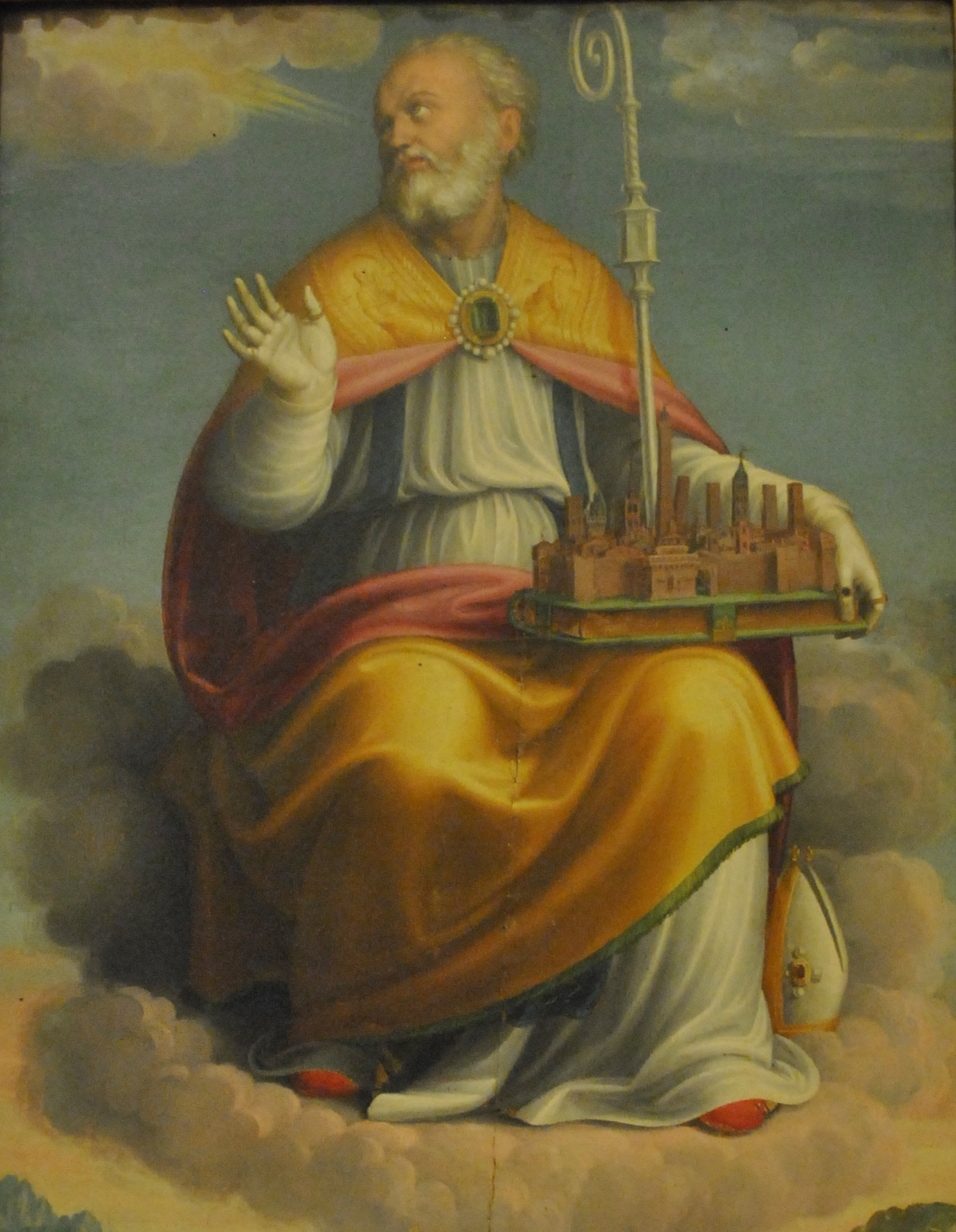
Innocenzo Francucci da Imola, "San Petronio in gloria", Museo Davia Bargellini

Some sources attribute a work on the life of the Egyptian monks (Vitæ patrum Ægypti monachorum) to Petronius; the Catholic Encyclopedia disagrees, attributing it to Rufinus of Aquileia. Germain Morin published a sermon entitled "In die ordinationis vel Natale episcopi" (Revue bénédictine, 1897, 3 sq.), which Gennadius ascribes to Bishop Petronius of Verona, whom Bruno Czalpa holds to be Petronius of Bologna.

According to Gennadius, Petronius died during the reign of Emperor Theodosius II and Valentinian III, i. e., before 450.

== Veneration ==
In the twelfth century appeared a legendary life of Petronius, whose relics were discovered in 1141. Shortly afterwards a church was erected in his honour at Bologna; a second, San Petronio Basilica, planned on a large seal, was begun in 1390. In 2000, his relics were moved from Santo Stefano to the Basilica of San Petronio.

The Catholic Church celebrates the feast of Saint Petronius on 4 October. In iconography, Petronius is depicted as a bishop holding a model of Bologna in his hand.

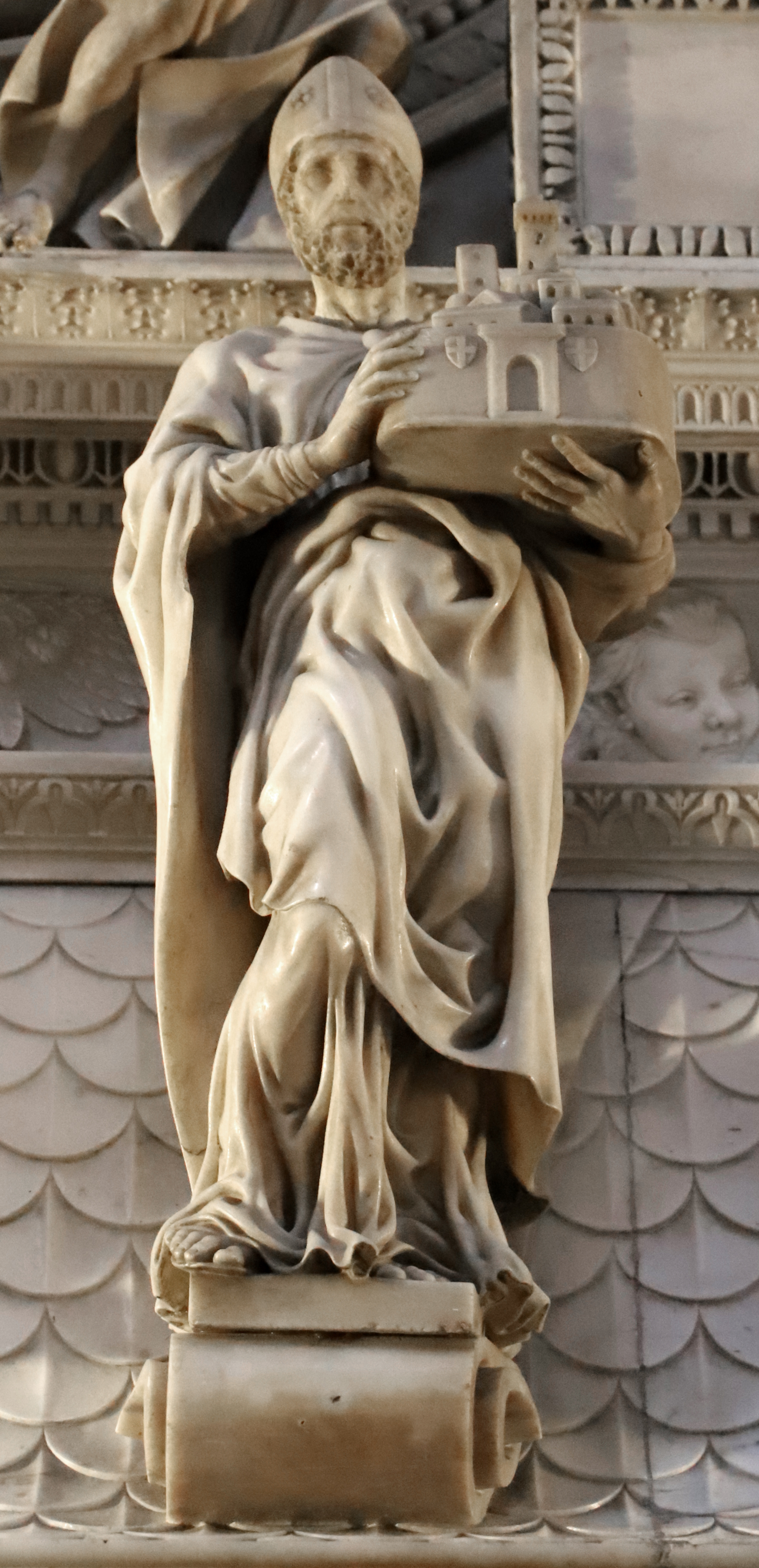
Basilica of San Domenico, in Bologna, contains a statue of St Petronius by Michelangelo

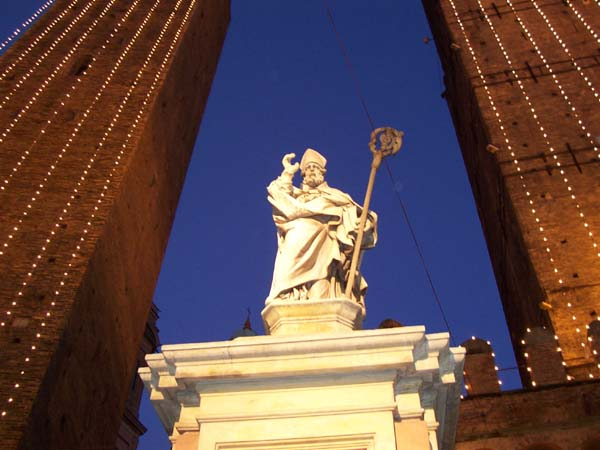
Statue of St Petronius in Piazza di Porta Ravegnana

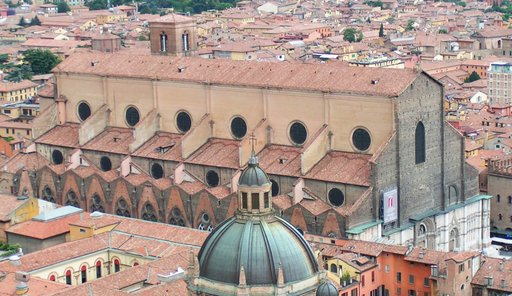
San Petronio Basilica

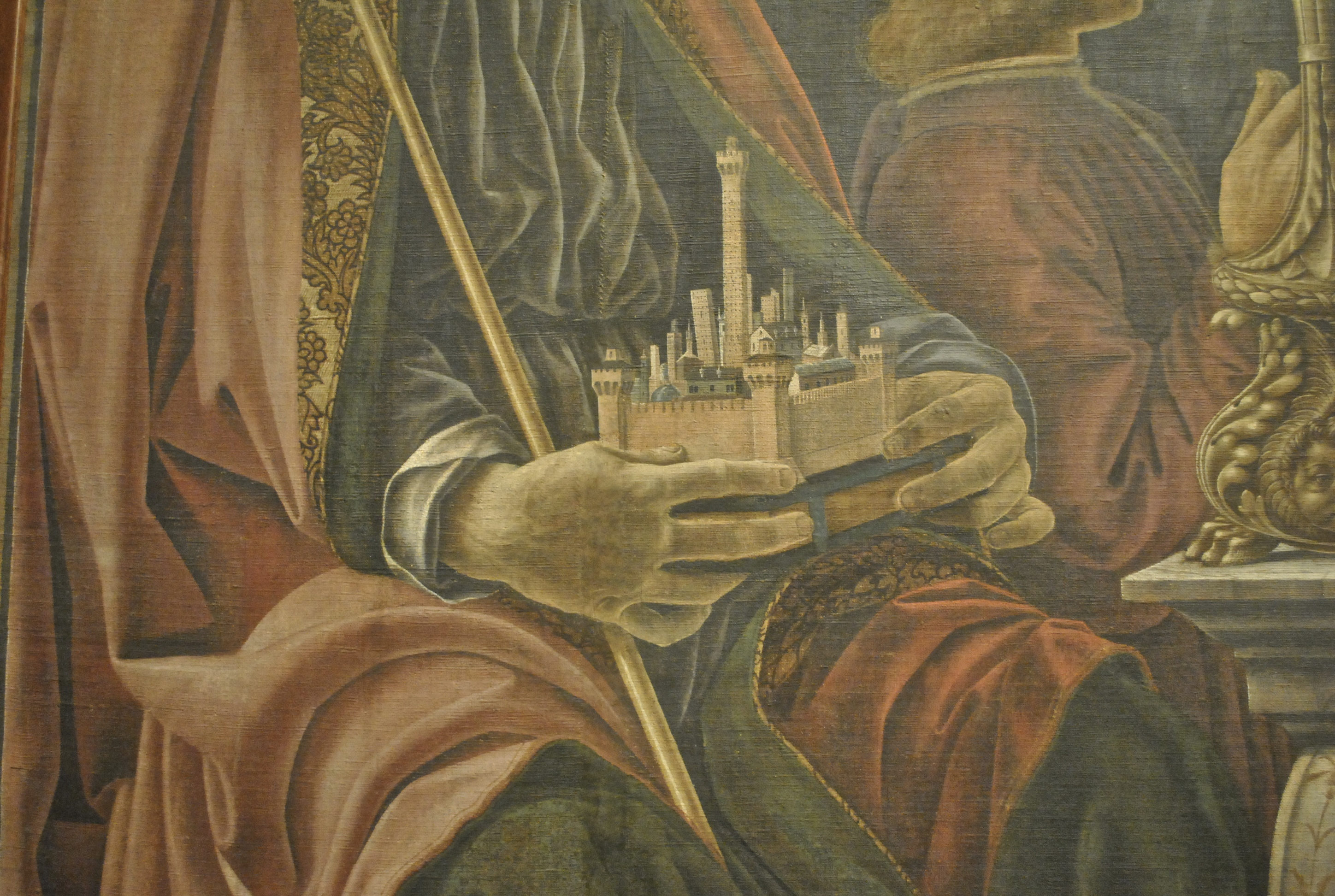
Francesco del Cossa, St Petronius (detail) Pala dei Mercanti

== Sources ==
- Ferguson, George (1961). Signs and Symbols in Christian Art New York: Oxford University Press, 1961, p. 139.
- Lanzoni, Francesco (1907). San Petronio vescovo di Bologna nella storia e nella leggenda (in Italian). Roma: Pustet.
- Filippini, F. (1948). S. Petronio vescovo di Bologna. Storia e leggenda. Bologna 1948. (in Italian)
- Lanzoni, Francesco (1832). ed. G. Cantagalli. Cronotassi dei vescovi di Bologna dai primordi alla fine del secolo XIII. Bologna 1932, pp. 30–33. (in Italian)
- Mathisen, Ralph W. (1981), "Petronius, Hilarius and Valerianus: Prosopographical Notes on the Conversion of the Roman Aristocracy," Historia. Zeitschrift für Alte Geschichte Band 30 (1981), pp. 106–112.
- Paolini, Lorenzo (2015). "Petronio, santo". Dizionario Biografico degli Italiani Volume 82 (2015) (in Italian)
