= Palazzo degli Strazzaroli, Bologna =

Palace in Bologna, Italy

Coordinates: 44°29′39.09″N 11°20′47.07″E

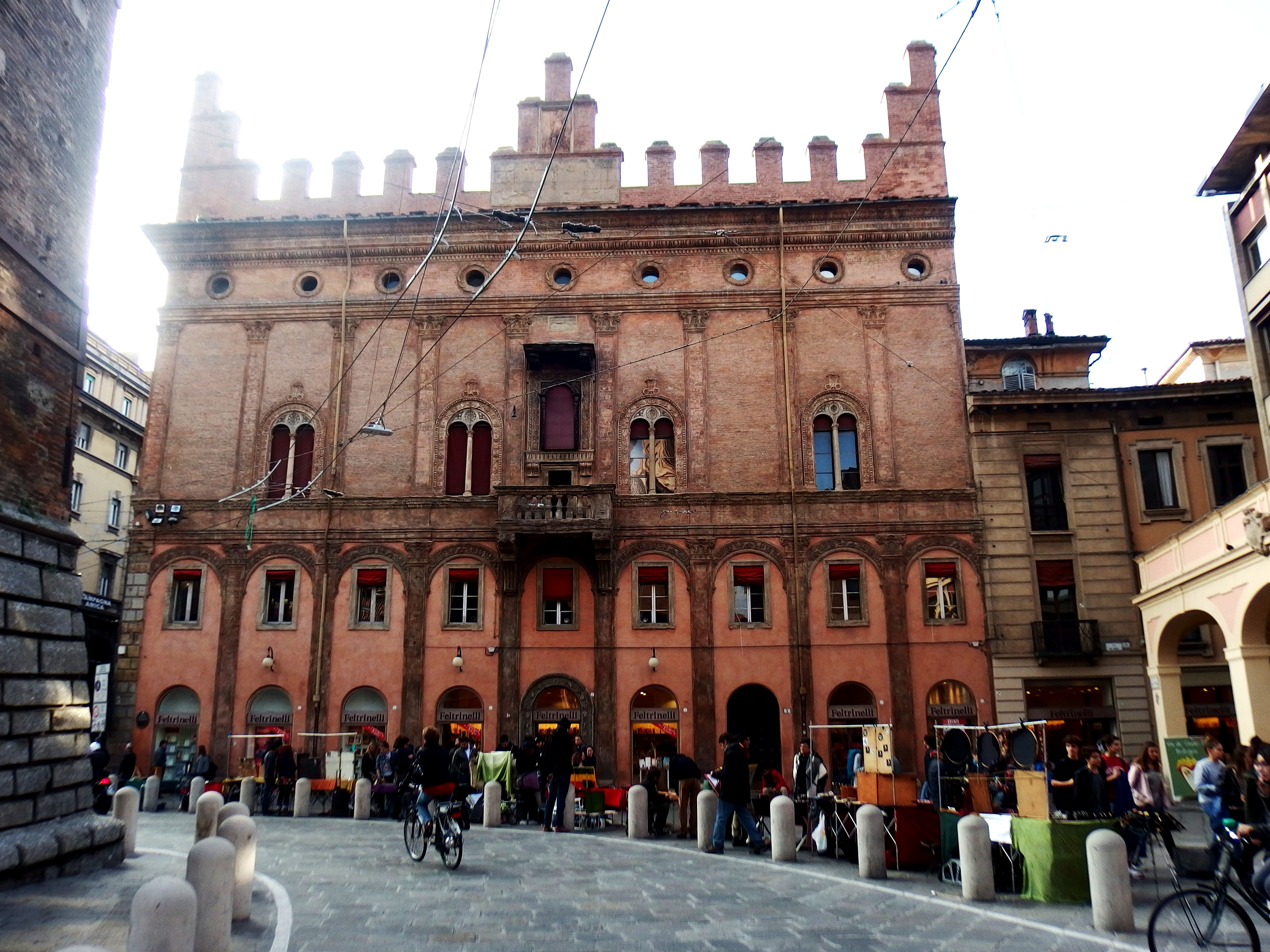
The facade of the palace

The Palazzo degli Strazzaroli is a Renaissance-style urban palace located at Piazza di Porta Ravegnana #1 in central Bologna, region of Emilia-Romagna, Italy.

== History ==
The palace was commissioned in 1486-96 by the guild of the Drappieri (cloth merchants and haberdashers) from the architect Giovanni Piccinini of Como. The palace was refurbished in 1620, by adding a balcony and a niche with a Madonna sculpted by Gabriele Fiorini. A property at the site may have belonged to the Pavanesi family, exiled for supporting a conspiracy by the Pepoli.

Carlo Cesare Malvasia cites Gaspare Nadi as the architect in 1496. In 1986, it was the property of the Monetti family.
