= Two Towers, Bologna =

12th-century buildings in Bologna, Italy

Coordinates: 44.4943°N 11.3468°E

Two Towers
- Due Torri
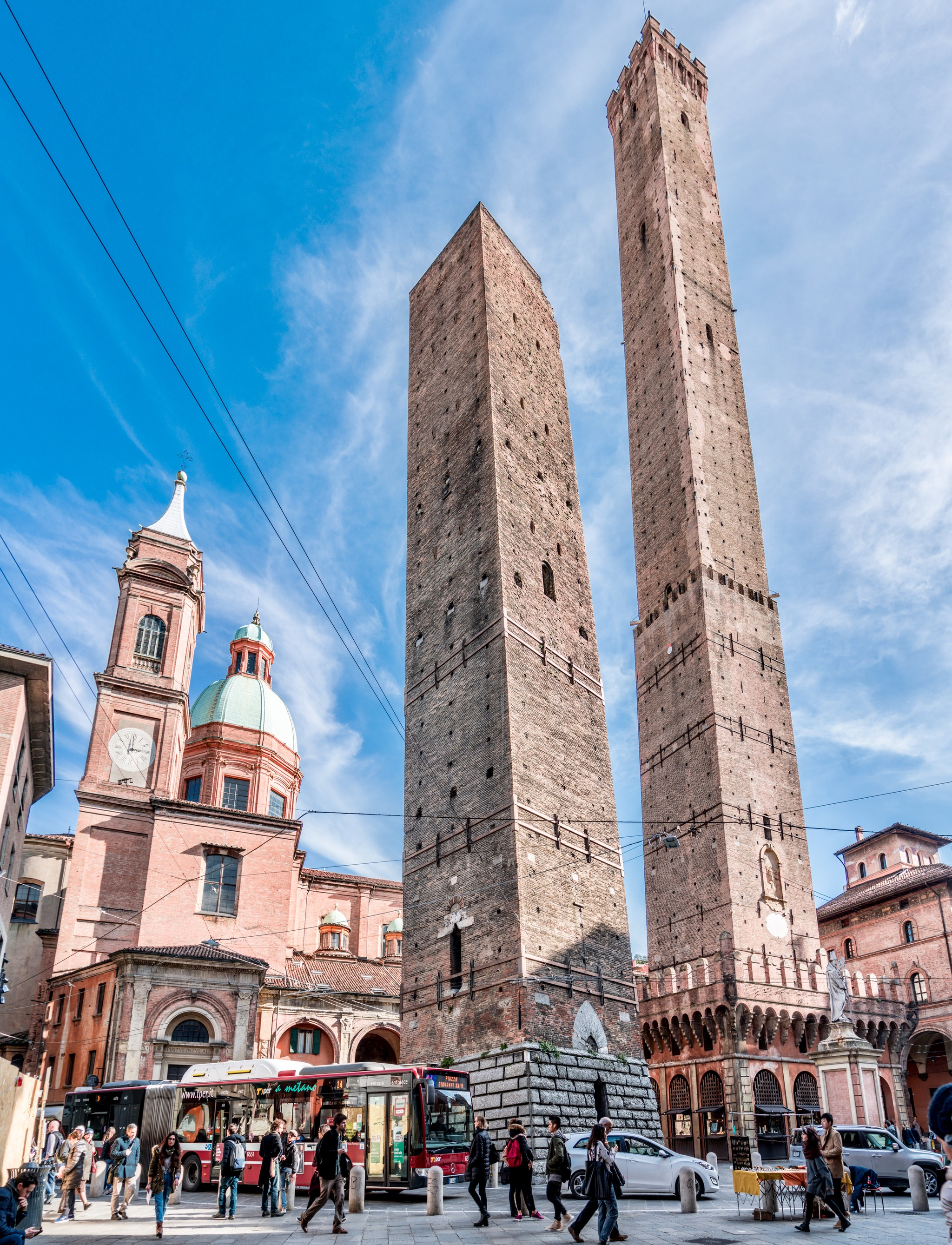
- Picture of the Two Towers in Bologna, Asinelli (right) and Garisenda (left)
- Interactive map of the Two Towers area

General information
- Status: Restored, but in critical danger of collapse
- Location: Bologna, Italy
- Year built: 1109–1119

The Two Towers (Italian: Due torri), both leaning, are symbols of Bologna, Italy, and the most prominent of the Towers of Bologna. They are located at the intersection of the roads that lead to the five gates of the old ring wall (mura dei torresotti). The taller one is the Asinelli; the smaller, with a greater lean, is the Garisenda. They are named for the families which are traditionally credited with having constructed them between 1109 and 1119.

Their construction may have been a competition between the two families to show which was the more powerful, but the scarcity of documents from this period makes this uncertain. The name of the Asinelli family, for example, is documented for the first time in 1185, almost 70 years after the presumed construction of the tower.

The Two Towers were the subject of a poem in Giosuè Carducci's Barbarian Odes. Charles Dickens wrote about them in his Pictures from Italy. Antal Szerb wrote about them in The Third Tower: Journeys in Italy.

== Asinelli Tower ==
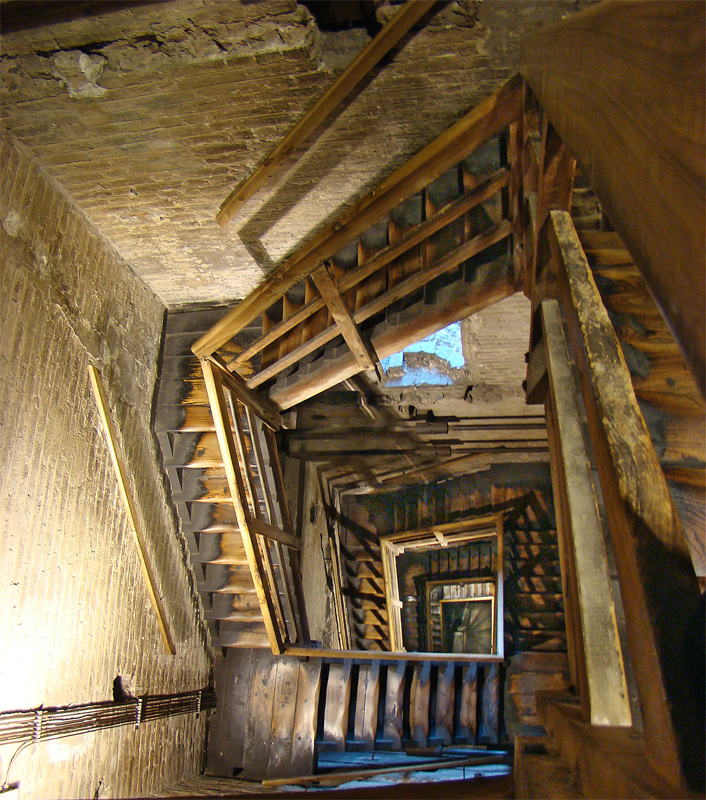
Inside the Asinelli Tower

It is believed that the Asinelli Tower initially had a height of ca. 70 metres (230 feet) and was raised later to the current 97.2 metres (319 ft), with an overhanging battlement of 2.2 m (6.6 ft). In the 14th century, the city became its owner and used it as a prison and small stronghold.

During this period, a wooden construction was added around the tower at a height of roughly 30 metres, about 100 feet, above ground, which was connected with an aerial footbridge to the Garisenda Tower. The footbridge was destroyed in a 1398 fire. Its addition is attributed to Giovanni Visconti, Duke of Milan, who allegedly wanted to use it to control the turbulent Mercato di Mezzo, the central street, today the via Rizzoli, to suppress possible revolts. The Visconti had become the rulers of Bologna after the decline of the Signoria of the Pepoli family, but were rather unpopular in the city.

Severe damage was caused by lightning that often resulted in small fires and collapses. In 1824 a lightning rod was installed. The tower has survived at least two documented large fires: the first in 1185 due to arson and a second in 1398.

The Asinelli Tower was used by the scientists Giovanni Battista Riccioli in 1640 and Giovanni Battista Guglielmini in the 1700s for experiments to study the motion of heavy bodies and the Earth's rotation. In World War II, between 1943 and 1945, it was used as a sight post: during bombing attacks, four volunteers took posts at the top to direct rescue operations to places hit by Allied bombs. Later, an RAI television relay was installed on top.

== Garisenda Tower ==
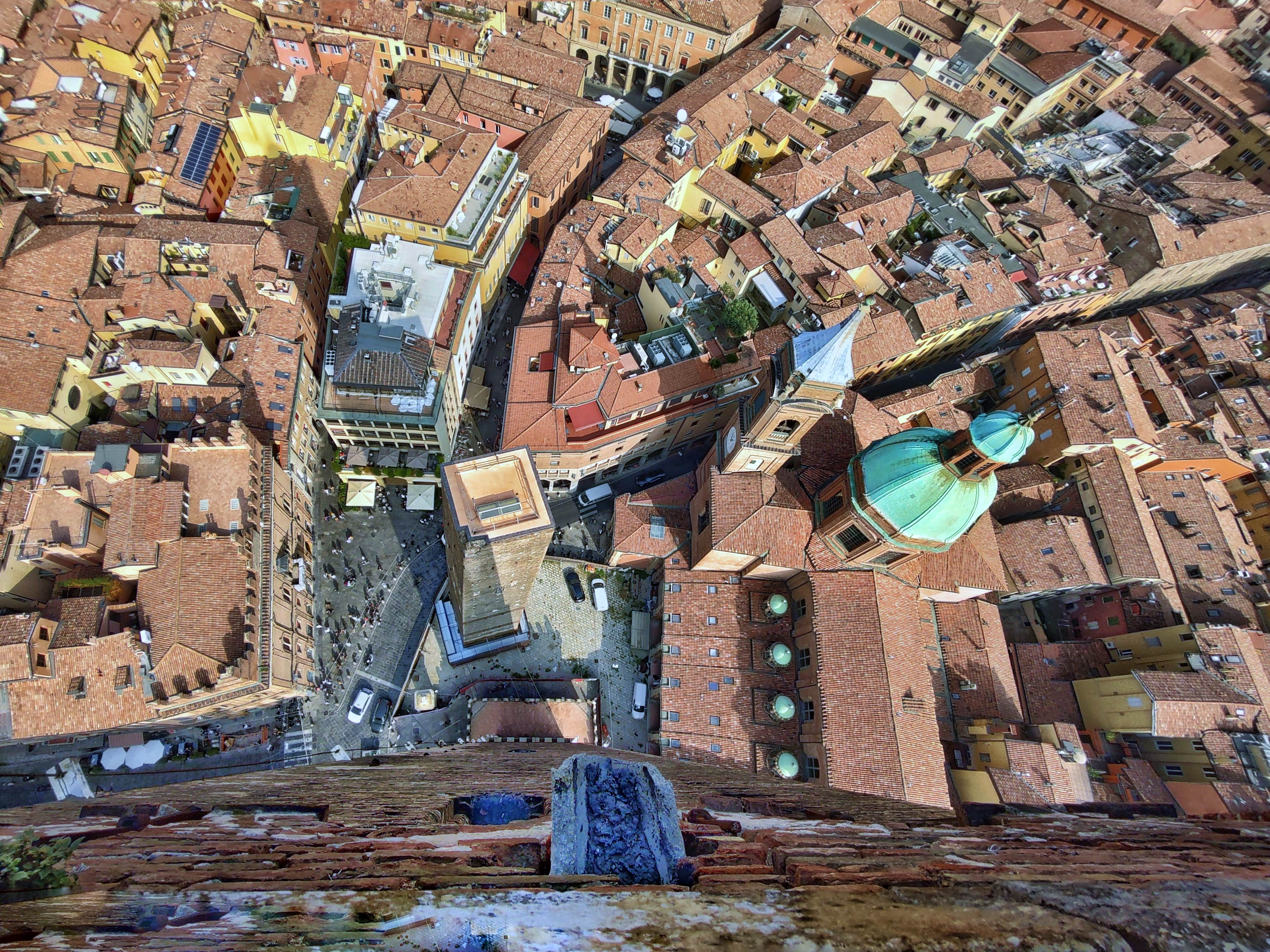
A view of Torre della Garisenda and Chiesa dei Santi Bartolomeo e Gaetano from Torre degli Asinelli

The Garisenda Tower today has a height of 48 metres (157 feet), with a lean of 3.2 metres (10 ft). Initially, it was approximately 60 metres (about 200 feet) high, but had to be lowered in the 14th century due to a yielding of the ground which left it slanting and dangerous. In the early 15th century, the tower was bought by the Arte dei Drappieri, which remained the sole owner until the Garisenda became municipal property at the end of the 19th century.

It was cited several times by Dante in the Divine Comedy and The Rhymes, a confirmation of his stay in Bologna, and by Goethe in his Italian Journey.

In October 2023, the tower was sealed off by the city of Bologna after fears the structure was tilting too far. Bologna officials noted that the tower has leaned since it was built; it had sustained additional damage in the medieval era when ironwork and bakery ovens were built inside. On 2 December 2023, the city announced that the tower was in danger of collapsing, and it began constructing a barrier to contain debris in the event of a fall. According to the city officials, work to prevent the collapse of the tower is expected to take at least 10 years and cost €20 million.
