= Medicina =

- Comune
- Comune di Medicina
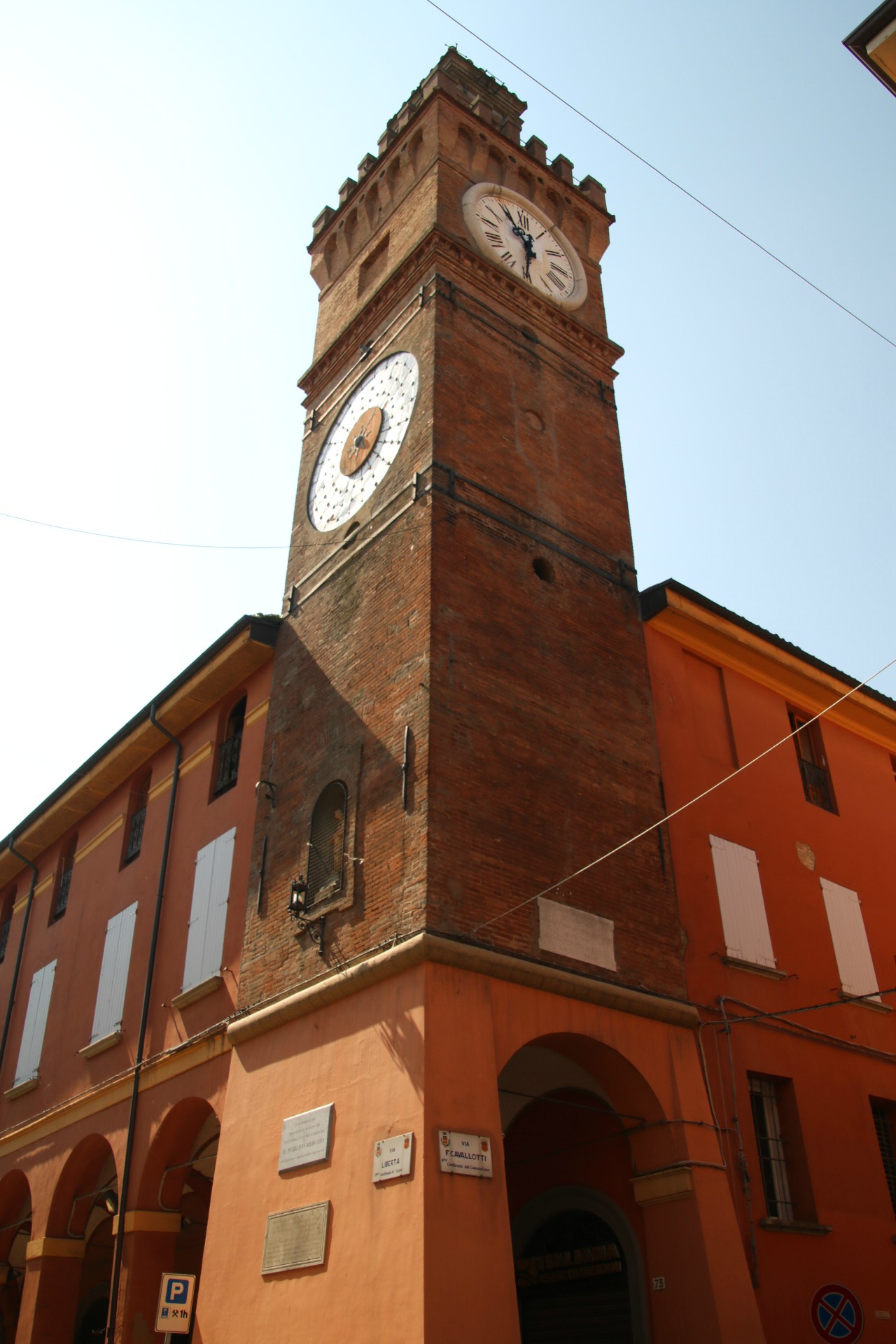
- Watch Tower.

- Coat of arms

- Location within Italy Location within Emilia-Romagna
- Coordinates: 44°29′N 11°38′E
- Country: Italy
- Region: Emilia-Romagna
- Metropolitan city: Bologna (BO)
- Frazioni: Buda, Crocetta, Fantuzza, Fiorentina, Fossatone, Ganzanigo, Portonovo, San Martino, Sant'Antonio, Via Nuova, Villa Fontana

Government
  - Mayor: Matteo Montanari

Area
  - Total: 159.11 km^{2} (61.43 sq mi)
- Elevation: 25 m (82 ft)

Population (31 October 2017)
  - Total: 16,774
  - Density: 105.42/km^{2} (273.05/sq mi)
- Demonym: Medicinesi
- Time zone: UTC+1 (CET)
  - Summer (DST): UTC+2 (CEST)
- Postal code: 40059
- Dialing code: 051
- Patron saint: St. Lucy
- Saint day: December 13
- Website: Official website

Medicina (Bolognese: Midgénna; Eastern Bolognese: Migìna) is an Italian comune with c. 16,000 inhabitants in the Metropolitan City of Bologna, part of the region of Emilia-Romagna.

== Name ==
The origins of its name (which in Italian means "medicine") are quite uncertain, and many hypotheses have been put forward. A legend tells that the Emperor Frederick Barbarossa, passing through Medicina from Milan fell ill and miraculously recovered because of a snake that accidentally came into the pot of his soup. It has been proved, though, that Barbarossa did pass through Medicina but that the name of the town predates that time. In memory of this legend the Festa del Barbarossa ("Barbarossa's party") takes place every year on the 3rd weekend of September.

== History ==
=== Antiquity and Roman Era ===
The territory of Medicina has ancient origins, with extensive archaeological excavations indicating permanent human settlements since the Villanovan culture and the subsequent Celtic migrations. During the expansion of the Roman Republic and Empire, the area became highly strategic due to its proximity to the Via Emilia. The land was subjected to an extensive process of centuriation, an advanced Roman surveying system that divided the agricultural countryside into a regular grid of plots. This structural layout permanently shaped the local drainage, road network, and agricultural landscape, remains of which are still visible in the modern topography.

=== Middle Ages and the Imperial Privileges ===
Following the collapse of the Western Roman Empire and centuries of regional instability under Byzantine and Lombard rule, the settlement emerged as a fortified center (castrum). In the High Middle Ages, local political and economic control was held by the Cattani of Medicina. These rural lords were later identified by modern archival and genealogical research as the Biancuzzi family, a prominent aristocratic clan that possessed vast landholdings and held significant feudal sway in the Bolognese countryside. Late 19th-century archival publications by the Deputazione di Storia Patria confirmed this dual nomenclature, noting that historical figures like Fuccirolo Cattaneo appeared in contemporary records under the variant Fulcinello Biancuzzi da Medicina.

The town and its ruling elite are famously immortalized by Dante Alighieri in Canto XXVIII of the Inferno, where the poet encounters the mutilated spirit of Pier da Medicina. Historically, Pier was a 13th-century nobleman from the Biancuzzi family who accumulated immense wealth and political influence by fostering bitter rivalries and diplomatic discord between the expansionist Commune of Bologna, neighboring local Signorie, and the Republic of Florence. The violent nature of the local medieval factions is further evidenced by chroniclers like Matteo Griffoni, who recorded the targeted assassination of Fulcinello Biancuzzi along the historic Via Tresenta by members of the rival De Navi family.

=== Annexation by Bologna and Papal Rule ===
Despite imperial protection, the rising geopolitical and military power of the Commune of Bologna eventually overwhelmed the town's independence. Throughout the 13th and 14th centuries, Bologna reasserted firm administrative control over the contado, dismantling the judicial authority of the local feudal nobility and incorporating the castle of Medicina into its defensive network. By the late 14th century, the main branches of the Biancuzzi family had fully relocated their residence into the urban core of Bologna, where they integrated into the urban patriciate and were later registered in heraldic rolls under the variants Biancucci and Brancucci.

During the conflicts between the Guelphs and Ghibellines, the town was repeatedly besieged, sacked, and heavily damaged, notably by the troops of the Visconti of Milan and local condottieri. In the 15th century, Medicina was integrated into the de facto signorial domain of the Bentivoglio family, who fostered agricultural innovations and canalization works in the marshy lowlands. Following the fall of the Bentivoglio and the military intervention of Pope Julius II in 1506, Medicina passed under the direct administration of the Papal States, remaining a major agricultural center until the Napoleonic invasion of 1796.

=== Modern and Contemporary Era ===
Following the Congress of Vienna (1815) and the restoration of papal authority, the territory of Medicina was progressively swept by the political ideals of the Risorgimento. In 1859, the town voted overwhelmingly to join the Kingdom of Sardinia, which became the unified Kingdom of Italy in 1861.

In the late 19th and early 20th centuries, Medicina developed a strong tradition of agrarian labor movements and trade unions (leghe bracciantili), becoming a central hub for socialist politics in the Bolognese lowlands. During World War II, the area was a highly active zone for the Italian partisan resistance against Nazi-Fascist occupation, suffering severe retaliations and combats until its liberation by allied forces in April 1945. In the post-war era, the municipality transitioned from a purely agrarian economy to an industrial and technological center, highlighted by the establishment of the Medicina Radio Observatory in the 1960s.

== Science ==
A radio observatory named "Croce del Nord" (Cross of the North) is located near Medicina (in the village of Fiorentina). It is made up of an aerial, 32 metres (105 ft) long, and of a much wider "cross". It is operated by the Istituto di Radioastronomia di Bologna (Institute for Radio Astronomy of Bologna), created by the CNR (National association for Research) and now part of the INAF and there is an identical one in Noto, Sicily.

== Sport ==
Medicina has a football and a basketball team, both playing in lower leagues, as well as a cycling team and a cycling development center for youth.

In August 2010 Medicina hosted six matches of the 2010 ICC World Cricket League Division Four, organised by Italy.

Giovanni Caprara, trainer of the Russian women volleyball team which won the World Championship in 2006, is a native of Medicina.

== Twin towns ==
- Škofja Loka, Slovenia
- Romilly-sur-Seine, France
