= Dicastery for the Causes of Saints =

Catholic Church dicastery overseeing the process of canonization of saints

- Dicasterium de Causis Sanctorum
- Coat of arms of the Holy See

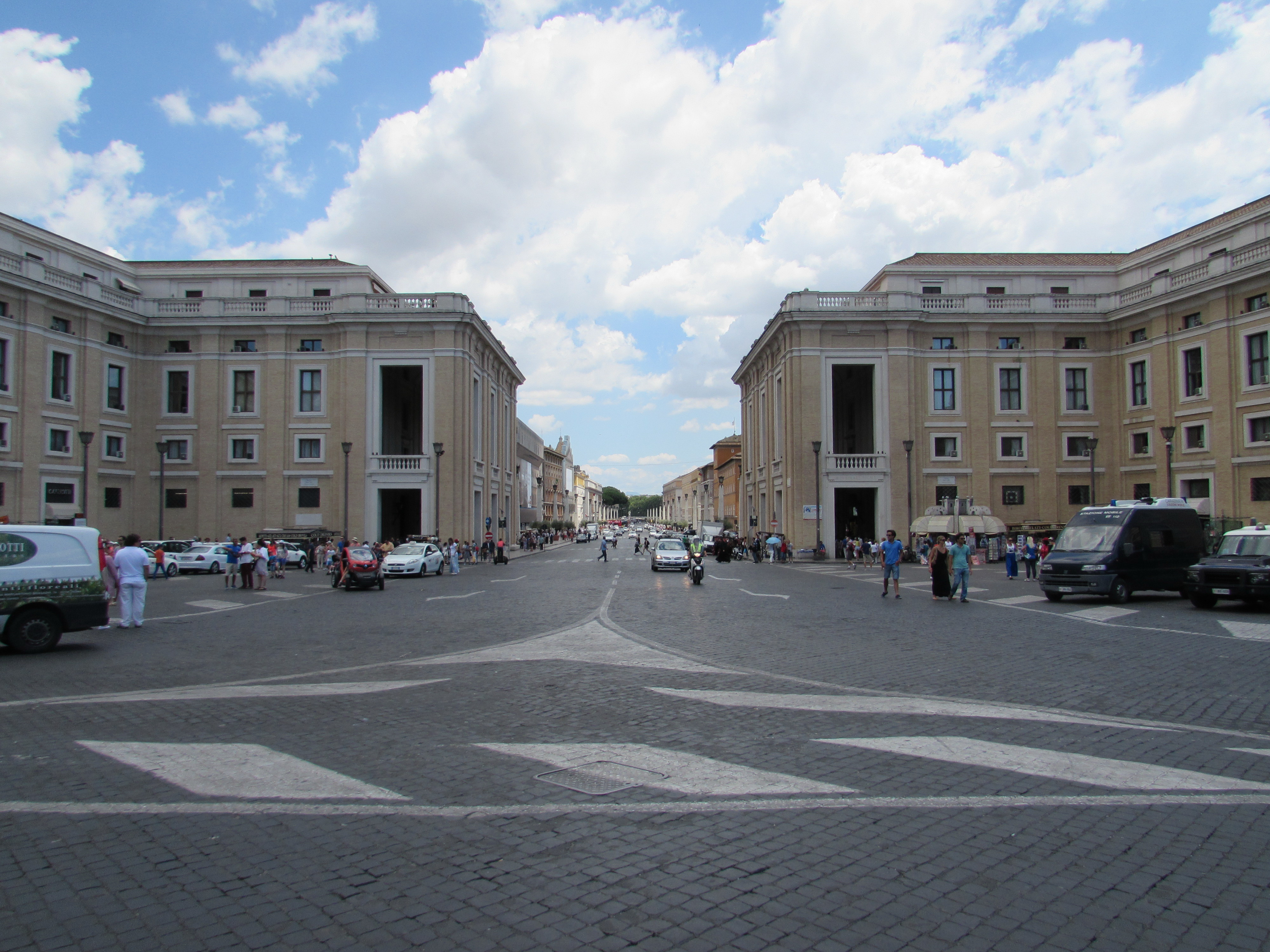
- Palazzo delle Congregazioni in Piazza Pio XII (in front of St. Peter's Square) is the workplace for most congregations of the Roman Curia

Dicastery overview
- Formed: 22 January 1588; 438 years ago
- Preceding agencies: Sacred Congregation of Rites; Congregation for the Causes of Saints
- Type: Dicastery
- Headquarters: Palazzo delle Congregazioni, Piazza Pio XII, Rome, Italy
- Dicastery executives: Marcello Semeraro, Prefect; Fabio Fabene, Secretary; P. Bogusław Stanisław Turek, Under-Secretary; Alberto Royo Mejía, Promoter of the Faith; Vacant, Relator General
- Website: https://www.causesanti.va

In the Catholic Church, the Dicastery for the Causes of Saints, previously named the Congregation for the Causes of Saints (Latin: Congregatio de Causis Sanctorum), is the dicastery of the Roman Curia that oversees the complex process that leads to the canonization of saints, passing through the steps of a declaration of "heroic virtues" and beatification. After preparing a case, including the approval of miracles, the case is presented to the pope, who decides whether or not to proceed with beatification or canonization.

== History ==
=== Early history ===
Saints were recognised by popular veneration acclamation until the 12th century. After controversial cases, Pope Alexander III in 1170 required all candidates for beatification to be approved by the Holy See. The papacy took total authority over the process in the 17th century.

=== Sacred Congregation of Rites ===
The Sacred Congregation for Rites was created by Pope Sixtus V on 22 January 1588 in the bull Immensa aeterni Dei. The congregation dealt both with regulating divine worship and the causes of saints.

=== Congregation for the Causes of Saints ===
On 8 May 1969, Pope Paul VI issued the apostolic constitution Sacra Rituum Congregatio, separating the Congregation into two parts: The Congregation for the Divine Worship and the renamed Sacred Congregation for the Causes of Saints, which was given three offices, those of the judiciary, the Promoter General of the Faith, and the historical-juridical.

With the changes in the canonization process introduced by Pope John Paul II in 1983, a College of Relators, with five relators (priests appointed to oversee the canonisation process), was added to prepare the cases of those declared as Servants of God. In January 2014, the Prefect of the Congregation announced that at the direction of Pope Francis those working on canonizations must adhere to financial guidelines to eliminate unfairness in the treatment of cases based on the financial resources provided. According to L'Osservatore Romano, Pope Francis hoped to promote the causes of those less well-known, those from poorer regions, and those who were victims of 20th-century totalitarian persecutions.

=== Dicastery for the Causes of Saints ===
As part of his 2022 reorganization of the Curia in Praedicate evangelium, Pope Francis renamed the congregation to the Dicastery for the Causes of Saints. It is working on about 1,600 causes, some dating from the 15th century.

== Canonization process ==
=== Before 1983 ===
==== Martyrs ====
The decision as to whether martyrs had died for their faith in Christ and the consequent permission of veneration lay originally with the bishop of the place in which they had borne their testimony. The bishop inquired into the motive of the person's death and, on finding they had died a martyr, sent their name with an account of their martyrdom to other churches, especially neighboring ones, so that, in the event of approval by their respective bishops, the cultus of the martyr might extend to their churches also and that the faithful, as is said of Ignatius of Antioch in the "Acts" of his martyrdom "might hold communion with the generous martyr of Christ" (generoso Christi martyri communicarent). Martyrs whose cause, so to speak, had been discussed, and the fame of whose martyrdom had been confirmed, were known as proved (vindicati) martyrs. That word probably did not antedate the fourth century, when it was introduced into the Church at Carthage; but the fact is certainly older. In the earlier ages, therefore, this veneration was entirely local and passed from one church to another with the permission of their bishops. This is clear from the fact that in ancient Christian cemeteries there are found paintings of only those martyrs who had suffered in that neighborhood. It explains, also, the almost universal veneration very quickly paid to, e.g., Lawrence, Cyprian, and Sixtus II, who were killed by the Roman Emperor Valerian.

==== Confessors ====
The veneration of confessors, who died peacefully after a life of heroic virtue, is not as ancient as that of martyrs. It was in the fourth century, as is commonly held, that confessors were first given public ecclesiastical honour, though occasionally praised in ardent terms by earlier Fathers.

Individual confessors themselves were sometimes called martyrs. Gregory Nazianzen calls Basil of Caesarea a martyr; John Chrysostom applies the same title to Eustachius of Antioch; Paulinus of Nola writes of Felix of Nola that he won heavenly honours sine sanguine martyr ("A bloodless martyr"); Gregory the Great styles Zeno of Verona as a martyr and Metronius gives to Roterius the same title. Later on, the names of confessors were inserted in the diptychs, and reverence was paid them. Their tombs were honoured with the same title (martyria) as those of the martyrs. It remained true, however, at all times that it was unlawful to venerate confessors without permission of the ecclesiastical authority as it had been so to venerate martyrs.

==== Authority to canonize ====
For several centuries, the bishops, or in some places only the primates and patriarchs, could grant martyrs and confessors public ecclesiastical honour; such honour, however, was always decreed only for the local territory of which the grantors had jurisdiction. Universal acceptance of the cultus was said to be made possible by the pope because he claimed to be the sole ruler the universal Catholic Church.

Toward the end of the eleventh century the popes judged it necessary to restrict episcopal authority in this regard, and therefore decreed that the virtues and miracles of persons proposed for public veneration should be examined in councils, more specifically in general councils. Popes Urban II, Calixtus II, and Eugene III conformed to this discipline. It happened, even after these decrees, that "some, following the ways of the pagans and deceived by the fraud of the evil one, venerated as a saint a man who had been killed while intoxicated." Pope Alexander III (1159–81) prohibited his veneration in these words: "For the future you will not presume to pay him reverence, as, even though miracles were worked through him, it would not allow you to revere him as a saint unless with the authority of the Roman Church." Theologians disagree as to the full import of this decretal: either a new law was instituted, in which case the Pope then for the first time reserved the right of beatification to himself, or an existing law was confirmed. Because the decretal did not end all controversy and some bishops did not obey it in so far as it regarded beatification, the right of which they had certainly possessed hitherto, Urban VIII published a papal bull in 1634 which ended all discussion by exclusively reserving to the Apostolic See both the right of canonization and that of beatification.

=== Since 1983 ===
The current steps for the recognition of a miracle follow rules laid down in 1983 by the apostolic constitution Divinus perfectionis Magister. Changes to the previous system included reduction of the waiting period for opening a Cause to five years after the candidate's death, previously 50; halving the number of miracles required; and abolishing the office of "devil's advocate", whose task was always to argue against canonisation.

The legislation establishes two procedural stages: the diocesan one and that of what is known as the Roman Congregation. The first takes place within the diocese where the allegedly miraculous event happened. The bishop opens the enquiry on the presumed miracle in which depositions of the eyewitnesses questioned by a duly constituted court are gathered, as well as the complete clinical and instrumental documentation inherent to the case. In the second, the Congregation examines the documents sent and eventual supplementary documentation, pronouncing its judgment on the matter.

The miracle may go beyond the possibilities of nature either in the substance of the fact or in the subject, or only in the way it occurs. The Dicastery distinguishes three degrees of miracles. The first degree is represented by resurrection from the dead (quoad substantiam). The second concerns the subject (quoad subiectum): the sickness of a person is judged incurable, in its course it can even have destroyed bones or vital organs; in this case not only is complete recovery noticed, but even wholesale reconstitution of the organs (restitutio in integrum). The third degree (quoad modum) involves instantaneous recovery from an illness that treatment could only have achieved after a long period.

In 2016 Cardinal Parolin, under the mandate of Pope Francis, approved new Regulations for the Medical Board of the Congregation for the Causes of Saints. The Regulations were published and signed by Cardinal Amato and Archbishop Marcello Bartolucci. The current text, explains Archbishop Bartolucci, "is inspired by the previous Regulation approved by Paul VI on 23 April 1976 and, aside from the linguistic and procedural updating, introduces some new elements, such as: the qualified majority, to proceed ad ulteriora to the examination of a presumed miracle, is at least 5/7 or 4/6; the case cannot be re-examined more than three times; for the re-examination of the presumed miracle a Board of nine members is required; the term of office of the president of the Board can be renewed only once (five years, plus another five year term); all those who are occupied with a presumed miracle (promoters of the cause, tribunal, postulators, experts, officials of the Dicastery) are held to secrecy[.]" These "new rules approved by Pope Francis and released by the Vatican on Friday are designed to make the process for approving a miracle in a sainthood cause more stringent, and also to ensure there's a clear paper trail behind who's picking up the tab and how much is being spent."

== Leadership ==
Current and recent past personnel are listed on the GCatholic Web site, which is updated as required.

Prefect of Congregation for the Causes of Saints
- Coat of arms of the Holy See
- Incumbent; Vacant since 21 April 2025
- Congregation for the Causes of Saints
- Style: His Eminence
- Member of: Roman Curia
- Reports to: The Pope
- Appointer: The Pope
- Term length: Five years, renewable

=== Prefects ===
==== For The Congregation for Rites (till 1969) ====
- Luigi Tripepi (7 January 1903 – 29 December 1906)
- Sebastiano Martinelli (8 February 1909 – 4 July 1918)
- Scipione Tecchi (8 November 1914 – 7 February 1915)
- Antonio Vico (11 February 1915 – 25 February 1929)
- Camillo Laurenti (12 March 1929 – 6 September 1938)
- Carlo Salotti (14 September 1938 – 24 October 1947)
- Clemente Micara (11 November 1950 – 17 January 1953)
- Gaetano Cicognani (7 December 1953 – 18 November 1954)
- Arcadio Larraona Saralegui (12 February 1962 – 9 January 1968)
- Benno Gut (29 June 1967 – 7 May 1969)

==== For Causes of Saints (from 1969) ====
- Paolo Bertoli (1969–1973)
- Luigi Raimondi (1973–1975)
- Corrado Bafile (1976–1980)
- Pietro Palazzini (1980–1988)
- Angelo Felici (1988–1995)
- Alberto Bovone (pro-prefect 1995–1998, prefect 1998)
- José Saraiva Martins (1998–2008)
- Angelo Amato (pro-prefect 2008–2010, prefect 2010–2018)
- Giovanni Angelo Becciu (2018 – 24 September 2020)
- Marcello Semeraro (2020-present)

=== Secretaries ===
- Ferdinando Giuseppe Antonelli (7 May 1969 – 5 March 1973)
- Giuseppe Casoria (2 February 1973 – 24 August 1981)
- Traian Crişan (7 December 1981 – 24 February 1990)
- Edward Nowak (24 February 1990 – 5 May 2007)
- Michele Di Ruberto (5 May 2007 – 29 December 2010)
- Marcello Bartolucci (29 December 2010 – 18 January 2021)
- Fabio Fabene (since 18 January 2021)

=== Relator Generals ===
- Ambrosius Eber (1990 – 10 October 2008)
- Vincenso Criscuolo (10 October 2008 – 13 January 2024)
- Angelo Romano (since 13 January 2024)

=== Promoter of the Faith (Prelate Theologian) ===
- Carmelo Pellegrino (5 November 2012–7 January 2023)
- Alberto Royo Mejía (since 7 January 2023)

== See also ==
- Chronological list of saints and blesseds, by century, by year of death
- List of canonizations, by pope, by date
- List of Catholic saints, by year
- List of saints, by name, in alphabetical order
- List of saints by pope
