= List of saints by pope =

This article is a list of saints by the pope who canonized them.

Although popes have been canonizing saints since at least 993 and have claimed sole authority to do so since the late 12th century, it has been rare historically for any pope to canonize more than a handful of saints.

== 9th Century ==
=== Pope Nicholas I ===
Pope Nicholas I canonized one saint.

No.	Saint	Date of Canonization
1.	Balthild of Chelles	c. 860

=== Pope Adrian II ===
Pope Adrian II canonized one saint.

No.	Saint	Date of Canonization
1.	Walpurga	870

=== Pope John VIII ===
Pope John VIII did not canonize any saints.

=== Pope Marinus I ===
Pope Marinus I did not canonize any saints.

=== Pope Adrian III ===
Pope Adrian III did not canonize any saints.

=== Pope Stephen V ===
Pope Stephen V did not canonize any saints.

=== Pope Formosus ===
Pope Formosus did not canonize any saints.

=== Pope Boniface VI ===
Pope Boniface VI did not canonize any saints.

=== Pope Stephen VI ===
Pope Stephen VI did not canonize any saints.

=== Pope Romanus ===
Pope Romanus did not canonize any saints.

=== Pope Theodore II ===
Pope Theodore II did not canonize any saints.

=== Pope John IX ===
Pope John IX did not canonize any saints.

== 10th Century ==
=== Pope Benedict IV ===
Pope Benedict IV did not canonize any saints.

=== Pope Leo V ===
Pope Leo V did not canonize any saints.

=== Pope Sergius III ===
Pope Sergius III did not canonize any saints.

=== Pope Anastasius III ===
Pope Anastasius III did not canonize any saints.

=== Pope Lando ===
Pope Lando did not canonize any saints.

=== Pope John X ===
Pope John X did not canonize any saints.

=== Pope Leo VI ===
Pope Leo VI did not canonize any saints.

=== Pope Stephen VII ===
Pope Stephen VII did not canonize any saints.

=== Pope John XI ===
Pope John XI did not canonize any saints.

=== Pope Leo VII ===
Pope Leo VII canonized one saint.

No.	Saint	Date of Canonization
1.	Willibald	938

=== Pope Stephen VIII ===
Pope Stephen VIII did not canonize any saints.

=== Pope Marinus II ===
Pope Marinus II did not canonize any saints.

=== Pope Agapetus II ===
Pope Agapetus II did not canonize any saints.

=== Pope John XII ===
Pope John XII did not canonize any saints.

=== Pope Benedict V ===
Pope Benedict V did not canonize any saints.

=== Pope Leo VIII ===
Pope Leo VIII did not canonize any saints.

=== Pope John XIII ===
Pope John XIII canonized one saint.

No.	Saint	Date of Canonization
1.	Eadburh of Winchester	972

=== Pope Benedict VII ===
Pope Benedict VII canonized one saint.

No.	Saint	Date of Canonization
1.	Ida of Herzfeld	990

=== Pope John XIV ===
Pope John XIV did not canonize any saints.

=== Pope John XV ===
Pope John XV canonized one saint.

No.	Saint	Date of Canonization
1.	Ulrich of Augsburg	4 July 993

=== Pope Gregory V ===
Pope Gregory V did not canonize any saints.

=== Pope Sylvester II ===
Pope Sylvester II canonized one saint.

No.	Saint	Date of Canonization
1.	Adalbert of Prague	999

== 11th Century ==
=== Pope John XVII ===
Pope John XVII did not canonize any saints.

=== Pope John XVIII ===
Pope John XVIII did not canonize any saints.

=== Pope Sergius IV ===
Pope Sergius IV did not canonize any saints.

=== Pope Benedict VIII ===
Pope Benedict VIII canonized one saint.

No.	Saint	Date of Canonization
1.	Simeon of Mantua	1016

=== Pope John XIX ===
Pope John XIX canonized three saints.

No.	Saint	Date of Canonization
1.	Adalard of Corbie	1026
2.	Bononio	1026
3.	Dunstan	1029

=== Pope Sylvester III ===
Pope Sylvester III did not canonize any saints.

=== Pope Benedict IX ===
Pope Benedict IX canonized two saints

No.	Saint	Date of Canonization
1.	John of Beverley	1037
2.	Symeon of Trier	25 December 1041

=== Pope Clement II ===
Pope Clement II canonized one saint.

No.	Saint	Date of Canonization
1.	Wiborada	5 January 1047

=== Pope Damasus II ===
Pope Damasus II did not canonize any saints.

=== Pope Leo IX ===
Pope Leo IX canonized nine saints

No.	Saint	Date of Canonization
1.	Deodatus of Nevers	1049
2.	Remigius	1049
3.	Floribert of Liège	20 April 1049
4.	Romaric	3 December 1049
5.	Amatus	3 December 1049
6.	Adelphus	3 December 1049
7.	Gerard of Toul	2 May 1050
8.	Wolfgang of Regensburg	8 October 1052
9.	Erhard of Regensburg	8 October 1052

=== Pope Victor II ===
Pope Victor II did not canonize any saints.

=== Pope Stephen IX ===
Pope Stephen IX did not canonize any saints.

=== Pope Nicholas II ===
Pope Nicholas II did not canonize any saints.

=== Pope Alexander II ===
Pope Alexander II canonized four saints.

No.	Saint	Date of Canonization
1.	William of Gellone	1066
2.	Arialdo	1067
3.	Robert de Turlande	1070
4.	Theobald of Provins	1073

=== Pope Gregory VII ===
Pope Gregory VII canonized nine saints

No.	Saint	Date of Canonization
1.	Paschasius Radbertus	12 July 1073
2.	Heribert of Cologne	1075
3.	Alphege of Canterbury	1078
4.	Pope Leo IX	1082
5.	Gerard Sagredo	1083
6.	Stephen of Hungary	20 August 1083
7.	Emeric of Hungary	1083
8.	Andrew Zorard	1083
9.	Benedict of Skalka	1083

=== Pope Victor III ===
Pope Victor III did not canonize any saints.

=== Pope Urban II ===
Pope Urban II canonized six saints.

No.	Saint	Date of Canonization
1.	Godelieve	1084
2.	Erlembald	1095
3.	Attilanus	1095
4.	Gohard	1096
5.	Adelaide of Burgundy	1097
6.	Nicholas the Pilgrim	1098

== 12th Century ==
=== Pope Paschal II ===
Pope Paschal II canonized four saints.

No.	Saint	Date of Canonization
1.	Angilbert	1100
2.	Canute	19 April 1101
3.	Peter of Anagni	4 June 1109

=== Pope Gelasius II ===
Pope Gelasius II did not canonize any saints

=== Pope Callixtus II ===
Pope Callixtus II canonized five saints

No.	Saint	Date of Canonization
1.	Arnulf of Soissons	6 January 1120
2.	Hugh of Cluny	1120
3.	Conrad of Constance	1120
4.	David of Wales	1123
5.	Gerard of Potenza	1123

=== Pope Honorius II ===
Pope Honorius II did not canonize any saints

=== Pope Innocent II ===
Pope Innocent II canonized three saints.

No.	Saint	Date of Canonization
1.	Gotthard of Hildesheim	29 October 1131
2.	Hugh of Châteauneuf	22 April 1134
3.	Sturm	19 April 1139

=== Pope Celestine II ===
Pope Celestine II did not canonize any saints.

=== Pope Lucius II ===
Pope Lucius II did not canonize any saints.

=== Pope Eugene III ===
Pope Eugene III canonized two saints.

No.	Saint	Date of Canonization
1.	Henry II	4 March 1146
2.	Senatro of Missanello	1 August 1151

=== Pope Anastasius IV ===
Pope Anastasius IV did not canonize any saints.

=== Pope Adrian IV ===
Pope Adrian IV canonized three saints.

No.	Saint	Date of Canonization
1.	Famianus of Compostela	1154
2.	Sigfrid of Sweden	1158
3.	Henry of Uppsala	1158

=== Pope Alexander III ===
Pope Alexander III canonized seven saints.

No.	Saint	Date of Canonization
1.	Edward the Confessor	7 February 1161
2.	Anselm of Canterbury	9 June 1163
3.	Theotonius of Coimbra	1163
4.	Helen of Skövde	1164
5.	Canute Lavard	8 November 1164
6.	Thomas Becket	21 February 1173
7.	Bernard of Clairvaux	18 January 1174

=== Pope Lucius III ===
Pope Lucius III canonized four saints.

No.	Saint	Date of Canonization
1.	Bruno di Segni	5 September 1181
2.	Silaus of Lucca	1183
3.	Anno of Cologne	1183
4.	Galgano Guidotti	1185

=== Pope Urban III ===
Pope Urban III did not canonize any saints.

=== Pope Gregory VIII ===
Pope Gregory VIII did not canonize any saints.

=== Pope Clement III ===
Pope Clement III canonized four saints.

No.	Saint	Date of Canonization
1.	Kjeld	1188
2.	Stephen of Muret	21 March 1189
3.	Otto of Bamberg	29 April 1189
4.	Malachy	1191

=== Pope Celestine III ===
Pope Celestine III canonized nine saints

No.	Saint	Date of Canonization
1.	Peter of Tarentaise	10 May 1191
2.	Ladislaus I of Hungary	27 June 1192
3.	Ubald	4 March 1192
4.	Ronald of Orkney	1192
5.	Bernward of Hildesheim	8 January 1193
6.	John Gualbert	24 October 1193
7.	Gaucherius	1194
8.	Rudesind	1195
9.	Gerald of Sauve-Majeure	27 April 1197

== 13th Century ==
=== Innocent III ===
Pope Innocent III canonized nine saints.

No.	Saint	Date of Canonization
1.	Homobonus	21 Jan 1199
2.	Cunigunde of Luxembourg	3 April 1200
3.	Jón Ögmundsson	1201
4.	Gilbert of Sempringham	1202
5.	William of Maleval	8 May 1202
6.	Wulfstan of Worcester	14 May 1203
7.	Belina	1203
8.	Procopius of Sázava	2 July 1204
9.	Peter of Trevi	1 Oct 1215

=== Honorious III ===
Pope Honorious III canonized nine saints.

No.	Saint	Date of Canonization
1.	William of Donjeon	17 May 1218
2.	Bertrand of Comminges	1220
3.	Benedict of Nursia	1220
4.	Hugh of Lincoln	17 Feb 1220
5.	Robert of Molesme	8 Jan 1222
6.	William of Æbelholt	21 Jan 1224
7.	Lorcán Ua Tuathail	11 Dec 1225
8.	Raynerius of Aquila	1225
9.	William of York	18 March 1226

=== Gregory IX ===
Pope Gregory IX canonized five saints.

No.	Saint	Date of Canonization
1.	Francis of Assisi	16 July 1228
2.	Anthony of Padua	30 May 1232
3.	Virgil of Salzburg	18 June 1233
4.	Dominic of Osma	13 July 1234
5.	Elizabeth of Hungary	27 May 1235

=== Celestine IV ===
Pope Celestine IV did not canonize any saints.

=== Innocent IV ===
Pope Innocent IV canonized six saints.

No.	Saint	Date of Canonization
1.	Edmund of Abingdon	16 December 1246
2.	William Pinchon	24 March 1247
3.	Margaret of Scotland	1250
4.	George of Vienne	1251
5.	Peter of Verona	9 March 1253
6.	Stanislaus of Szczepanów	8 September 1253

=== Alexander IV ===
Pope Alexander IV canonized three saints.

No.	Saint	Date of Canonization
1.	Clare of Assisi	12 August 1255
2.	William of Perth	1256
3.	Íñigo of Oña	18 June 1259

=== Urban IV ===
Pope Urban IV canonized two saints.

No.	Saint	Date of Canonization
1.	Richard of Chichester	25 January 1262
2.	Felix of Valois	May 1, 1262

=== Clement IV ===
Pope Clement IV canonized one saint.

No.	Saint	Date of Canonization
1.	Hedwig of Silesia	26 March 1267

=== Gregory X ===
Pope Gregory X did canonized one saint.

No.	Saint	Date of Canonization
1.	Franca Visalta	21 September 1273

=== Innocent V ===
Pope Innocent V did not canonize any saints.

=== Adrian V ===
Pope Adrian V did not canonize any saints.

=== John XXI ===
Pope John XXI did not canonize any saints.

=== Nicholas III ===
Pope Nicholas III did not canonize any saints.

=== Martin IV ===
Pope Martin IV canonized one saint.

No.	Saint	Date of Canonization
1.	Benvenutus Scotivoli	1284

=== Honorius IV ===
Pope Honorius IV did not canonize any saints.

=== Nicholas IV ===
Pope Nicholas IV did not canonize any saints.

=== Celestine V ===
Pope Celestine V did not canonize any saints.

=== Boniface VIII ===
Pope Boniface VIII canonized three saints.

No.	Saint	Date of Canonization
1.	Laurian	1297
2.	Nantovinus	1297
3.	Louis IX of France	11 July 1297

== 14th Century ==
=== Benedict XI ===
Pope Benedict XI did not canonize any saints.

=== Clement V ===
Pope Clement V canonized one saint.

No.	Saint	Date of Canonization
1.	Pope Celestine V	5 May 1313

=== John XXII ===
Pope John XXII canonized three saints.

No.	Saint	Date of Canonization
1.	Louis of Anjou	7 April 1317
2.	Thomas de Cantilupe	17 April 1320
3.	Thomas Aquinas	18 July 1323

=== Benedict XII ===
Pope Benedict XII did not canonize any saints.

=== Clement VI ===
Pope Clement VI canonized one saint.

No.	Saint	Date of Canonization
1.	Ivo of Kermartin	26 June 1347

=== Innocent VI ===
Pope Innocent VI did not canonize any saints.

=== Urban V ===
Pope Urban V canonized two saints.

No.	Saint	Date of Canonization
1.	Elzéar of Sabran	15 April 1369
2.	Calamanda of Calaf	

=== Gregory XI ===
Pope Gregory XI did not canonize any saints.

=== Urban VI ===
Pope Urban VI canonized one saint.

No.	Saint	Date of Canonization
1.	Mildrith	1388

=== Boniface IX ===
Pope Boniface IX canonized two saints.

No.	Saint	Date of Canonization
1.	Bridget of Sweden	7 October 1391
2.	John Twenge	1401

== 15th Century ==
=== Innocent VII ===
Pope Innocent VII did not canonize any saints.

=== Gregory XII ===
Pope Gregory XII did not canonize any saints.

=== Martin V ===
Pope Martin V canonized one saint.

No.	Saint	Date of Canonization
1.	Sebaldus	26 March 1425

=== Eugene IV ===
Pope Eugene IV canonized three saints.

No.	Saint	Date of Canonization
1.	Honorius of Buzançais	1444
2.	Nicholas of Tolentino	1 February 1447
3.	Bellinus of Padua	

=== Nicholas V ===
Pope Nicholas V canonized two saints.

No.	Saint	Date of Canonization
1.	Sergius of Radonezh	1449
2.	Bernardine of Siena	24 May 1450

=== Callixtus III ===
Pope Callixtus III canonized five saints.

No.	Saint	Date of Canonization
1.	Vincent Ferrer	3 June 1455
2.	Angelus of Jerusalem	1456
3.	Osmund	1 January 1457
4.	Albert of Trapani	15 October 1457
5.	Rose of Viterbo	1457

=== Pius II ===
Pope Pius II canonized one saint.

No.	Saint	Date of Canonization
1.	Catherine of Siena	29 June 1461

=== Paul II ===
Pope Paul II did not canonize any saints.

=== Sixtus IV ===
Pope Sixtus IV canonized six saints.

No.	Saint	Date of Canonization
1.	Berard of Carbio and companions	7 Aug 1481
2.	Bonaventure	14 May 1482

=== Innocent VIII ===
Pope Innocent VIII canonized two saint.

No.	Saint	Date of Canonization
1.	Catherine of Vadstena	1484
2.	Leopold the Good	6 Jan 1485

=== Alexander VI ===
Alexander VI canonized one saint.

No.	Saint	Date of Canonization
1.	Brinolfo Algotsson	16 August 1492

=== Pius III ===
Pope Pius III did not canonize any saints.

== 16th Century ==
=== Julius II ===
Pope Julius II canonized six saints.

No.	Saint	Date of Canonization
1.	Nicolò Politi	7 June 1507
2.	Five Polish Brothers	1508

=== Leo X ===
Pope Leo X canonized eleven saints.

No.	Saint	Date of Canonization
1.	Lidanus	
2.	Daniele Fasanella and his six companions	22 January 1516
3.	Francis of Paola	1 May 1519
4.	Hunna	1520
5.	Casimir Jagiellon	1521

=== Adrian VI ===
Pope Adrian VI canonized one saint.

No.	Saint	Date of Canonization
1.	Benno of Meissen	31 May 1523

=== Clement VII ===
Pope Clement VII canonized one saint.

No.	Saint	Date of Canonization
1.	Antoninus of Florence	23 Nov 1523

=== Paul III ===
Pope Paul III canonized two saints.

No.	Saint	Date of Canonization
1.	Ginés de la Jara	1541
2.	Abraham of Smolensk	1549

=== Julius III ===
Pope Julius III did not canonize any saints.

=== Marcellus II ===
Pope Marcellus II did not canonize any saints.

=== Paul IV ===
Pope Paul IV did not canonize any saints.

=== Pius IV ===
Pope Pius IV did not canonize any saints.

=== Pius V ===
Pope Pius V canonized one saint.

No.	Saint	Date of Canonization
1.	Ivo of Chartres	18 December 1570

=== Gregory XIII ===
Pope Gregory XIII canonized one saint.

No.	Saint	Date of Canonization
1.	Norbert of Xanten	1582

=== Sixtus V ===
Pope Sixtus V canonized one saint.

No.	Saint	Date of Canonization
1.	Didacus of Alcalá	2 July 1588

=== Urban VII ===
Pope Urban VII did not canonize any saints.

=== Gregory XIV ===
Pope Gregory XIV did not canonize any saints.

=== Innocent IX ===
Pope Innocent IX did not canonize any saints.

=== Clement VIII ===
Pope Clement VIII canonized five saints.

No.	Saint	Date of Canonization
1.	Hyacinth of Poland	17 April 1594
2.	Julian of Cuenca	18 October 1594
3.	Romualdo di Camaldoli	1595
4.	Sylvester Gozzolini	1598
5.	Raymond of Penyafort	29 April 1601

== 17th Century ==
=== Leo XI ===
Pope Leo XI did not canonize any saints

=== Paul V ===
Pope Paul V canonized five saints.

No.	Saint	Date of Canonization
1.	Anthelm of Belley	1607
2.	Frances of Rome	29 May 1608
3.	Charles Borromeo	1 November 1610
4.	Pompejanus	1615
5.	Albert of Louvain	9 August 1613

=== Gregory XV ===
Pope Gregory XV canonized six saints.

No.	Saint	Date of Canonization
1.	Isidore the Laborer	12 March 1622
2.	Francis Xavier	12 March 1622
3.	Ignatius of Loyola	12 March 1622
4.	Teresa of Ávila	12 March 1622
5.	Philip Neri	12 March 1622
6.	Bruno of Cologne	17 February 1623

=== Urban VIII ===
Pope Urban VIII canonized seven saints.

No.	Saint	Date of Canonization
1.	Stephen Harding	1623
2.	Conrad of Piacenza	2 June 1625
3.	Peter Nolasco	5 November 1625
4.	Elizabeth of Portugal	24 June 1626
5.	Peter Thomas	1628
6.	Andrew Corsini	22 April 1629
7.	Conon of Naso	16 Feb 1630

=== Innocent X ===
Pope Innocent X did not canonize any saints.

=== Alexander VII ===
Pope Alexander VII canonized four saints.

No.	Saint	Date of Canonization
1.	Raymond Nonnatus	1657
2.	Thomas of Villanova	1 November 1658
3.	Francis de Sales	19 April 1665
4.	John of Matha	21 October 1666

=== Clement IX ===
Pope Clement IX canonized three saints.

No.	Saint	Date of Canonization
1.	Mary Magdalene de' Pazzi	28 April 1669
2.	Peter of Alcántara	28 April 1669
3.	Raymond Nonnatus	13 August 1669

=== Clement X ===
Pope Clement X canonized eight saints.

No.	Saint	Date of Canonization
1.	Peter Pascual	14 August 1670
2.	Ferdinand III of Castile	4 April 1671
3.	Cajetan	12 April 1671
4.	Francisco de Borja	12 April 1671
5.	Louis Bertrand	12 April 1671
6.	Philip Benizi	12 April 1671
7.	Rose of Lima	12 April 1671
8.	Leo III	1673

=== Innocent XI ===
Pope Innocent XI canonized three saints.

No.	Saint	Date of Canonization
1.	Gertrude the Great	22 January 1678
2.	Bernard of Menthon	1681
3.	Pedro Armengol	8 April 1687

=== Alexander VIII ===
Pope Alexander VIII canonized five saints.

No.	Saint	Date of Canonization
1.	John of Capistrano	16 October 1690
2.	John of God	16 October 1690
3.	John of Sahagún	16 October 1690
4.	Lawrence Justinian	16 October 1690
5.	Paschal Baylón	16 October 1690

=== Innocent XII ===
Pope Innocent XII canonized two saints.

No.	Saint	Date of Canonization
1.	Mary de Cervellione	13 February 1692
2.	Zita	5 September 1696

== 18th Century ==
=== Clement XI ===
Pope Clement XI canonized nine saints.

No.	Saint	Date of Canonization
1.	Stephen of Obazine	1701
2.	Boniface of Brussels	1702
3.	Bernat Calbó	26 September 1710
4.	Andrew Avellino	22 May 1712
5.	Catherine of Bologna	22 May 1712
6.	Felix of Cantalice	22 May 1712
7.	Pope Pius V	22 May 1712
8.	Saint Sara	22 may 1712
9.	Humility	27 Jan 1720

=== Innocent XIII ===
Pope Innocent XIII did not canonize any saints.

=== Benedict XIII ===
Pope Benedict XIII canonized seventeen saints.

No.	Saint	Date of Canonization
1.	Boris and Gleb	1724
2.	Agnes of Montepulciano	10 December 1726
3.	James of the Marches	10 December 1726
4.	Turibius of Mongrovejo	10 December 1726
5.	Francis Solanus	27 December 1726
6.	John of the Cross	27 December 1726
7.	Peregrine Laziosi	27 December 1726
8.	Aloysius Gonzaga	31 December 1726
9.	Stanislaus Kostka	31 December 1726
10.	Bertharius	26 August 1727
11.	Gilbert of Neuffonts	22 January 1728
12.	Gottfried von Cappenberg	28 March 1728
13.	Serapion of Algiers	14 April 1728
14.	Margaret of Cortona	16 May 1728
15.	Pope Gregory VII	24 May 1728
16.	John of Nepomuk	19 March 1729

=== Clement XII ===
Pope Clement XII canonized five saints.

No.	Saint	Date of Canonization
1.	Peitro Oresolo	18 April 1731
2.	Catherine of Genoa	16 June 1737
3.	Juliana Falconieri	16 June 1737
4.	John Francis Regis	16 June 1737
5.	Vincent de Paul	16 June 1737

=== Benedict XIV ===
Pope Benedict XIV canonized ten saints.

No.	Saint	Date of Canonization
1.	Peter González	13 December 1741
2.	Gerard of Lunel	1 August 1742
3.	Peter de Regalado	29 June 1746
4.	Catherine of Ricci	29 June 1746
5.	Fidelis of Sigmaringen	29 June 1746
6.	Joseph of Leonessa	29 June 1746
7.	Camillus de Lellis	29 June 1746
8.	Agnes of Assisi	6 November 1751
9.	Saturius of Soria	31 August 1753
10.	Franco of Assergi	1757

=== Clement XIII ===
Pope Clement XIII canonized six saints.

No.	Saint	Date of Canonization
1.	Gerolamo Emiliani	16 July 1767
2.	Jane Frances de Chantal	16 July 1767
3.	John Cantius	16 July 1767
4.	Joseph Calasanz	16 July 1767
5.	Joseph of Cupertino	16 July 1767
6.	Seraphin of Montegranaro	16 July 1767

=== Clement XIV ===
Pope Clement XIV did not canonize any saints.

=== Pius VI ===
Pope Pius VI did not canonize any saints.

== 19th century ==
=== Pius VII ===
Pope Pius VII canonized five saints.

No.	Saint	Date of Canonization
1.	Angela Merici	24 May 1807
2.	Benedict the Moor	24 May 1807
3.	Colette Boylet	24 May 1807
4.	Francis Caracciolo	24 May 1807
5.	Hyacintha Mariscotti	24 May 1807

=== Leo XII ===
Pope Leo XII canonized two saints.

No.	Saint	Date of Canonization
1.	Peter Damian	1823
2.	Cumiano of Bobbio	

=== Pius VIII ===
Pope Pius VIII did not canonize any saints.

=== Gregory XVI ===
Pope Gregory XVI canonized six saints.

No.	Saint	Date of Canonization
1.	Philomena	30 January 1837
2.	Alphonsus Maria de Liguori	26 May 1839
3.	Francis de Geronimo	26 May 1839
4.	John Joseph of the Cross	26 May 1839
5.	Pacificus of San Severino	26 May 1839
6.	Veronica Giuliani	26 May 1839

=== Pius IX ===
Pope Pius IX canonized 54 saints in 11 causes.

No.	Saint	Date of Canonization
1.	Framboldus of Bayeux	13 June 1861
2.	Michael de Sanctis	8 June 1862
3.	Twenty-six Martyrs of Japan	9 June 1862
4.	Germaine Cousin	29 June 1867
5.	Josaphat Kuntsevych	29 June 1867
6.	Leonard of Port Maurice	29 June 1867
7.	Mary Frances of the Five Wounds	29 June 1867
8.	Nicholas Pieck and 18 companions	29 June 1867
9.	Paul of the Cross	29 June 1867
10.	Pedro de Arbués	29 June 1867
11.	Conus of Lucania	27 April 1871

=== Leo XIII ===
Pope Leo XIII canonized 19 saints in 12 causes.

== 20th century ==
=== Pius X ===
Pope Pius X canonized eleven saints.

No.	Saint	Date of Canonization
1.	Justus of Condat	9 December 1903
2.	Alexander Sauli	11 December 1904
3.	Gerard Majella	11 December 1904
4.	John of Montemarano	1906
5.	Alice of Schaerbeek	1907
6.	Romedius	24 July 1907
7.	Felicio, Simplicio, and Potentino of Karden	12 August 1908
8.	Clemens Maria Hofbauer	20 May 1909
9.	Joseph Oriol	20 May 1909

=== Benedict XV ===
Pope Benedict XV canonized four saints.

No.	Saint	Date of Canonization
1.	Peter of Canterbury	1915
2.	Gabriel of Our Lady of Sorrows	13 May 1920
3.	Marguerite Marie Alacoque	13 May 1920
4.	Joan of Arc	16 May 1920

=== Pius XI ===
Pope Pius XI canonized 34 saints in 27 causes.

=== Pius XII ===
Pope Pius XII canonized 36 saints. None were group causes.

=== John XXIII ===
Pope John XXIII canonized 10 saints. None were group causes.

=== Paul VI ===
Pope Paul VI canonized 85 saints in 21 causes.

=== John Paul I ===
Pope John Paul I did not canonize any saints.

=== John Paul II ===
Pope John Paul II canonized 482 saints in 110 causes.

== 21st century ==
=== Benedict XVI ===
Pope Benedict XVI canonized 45 saints. None were group causes.

=== Francis ===
Pope Francis canonized 942 saints in 68 causes, which includes the 813 Martyrs of Otranto as a group.

=== Leo XIV ===
- Pier Giorgio Frassati
- Carlo Acutis

== See also ==
- List of saints
