= Palacio de los Castejones =

Coordinates: 41.7650°N 2.4671°W

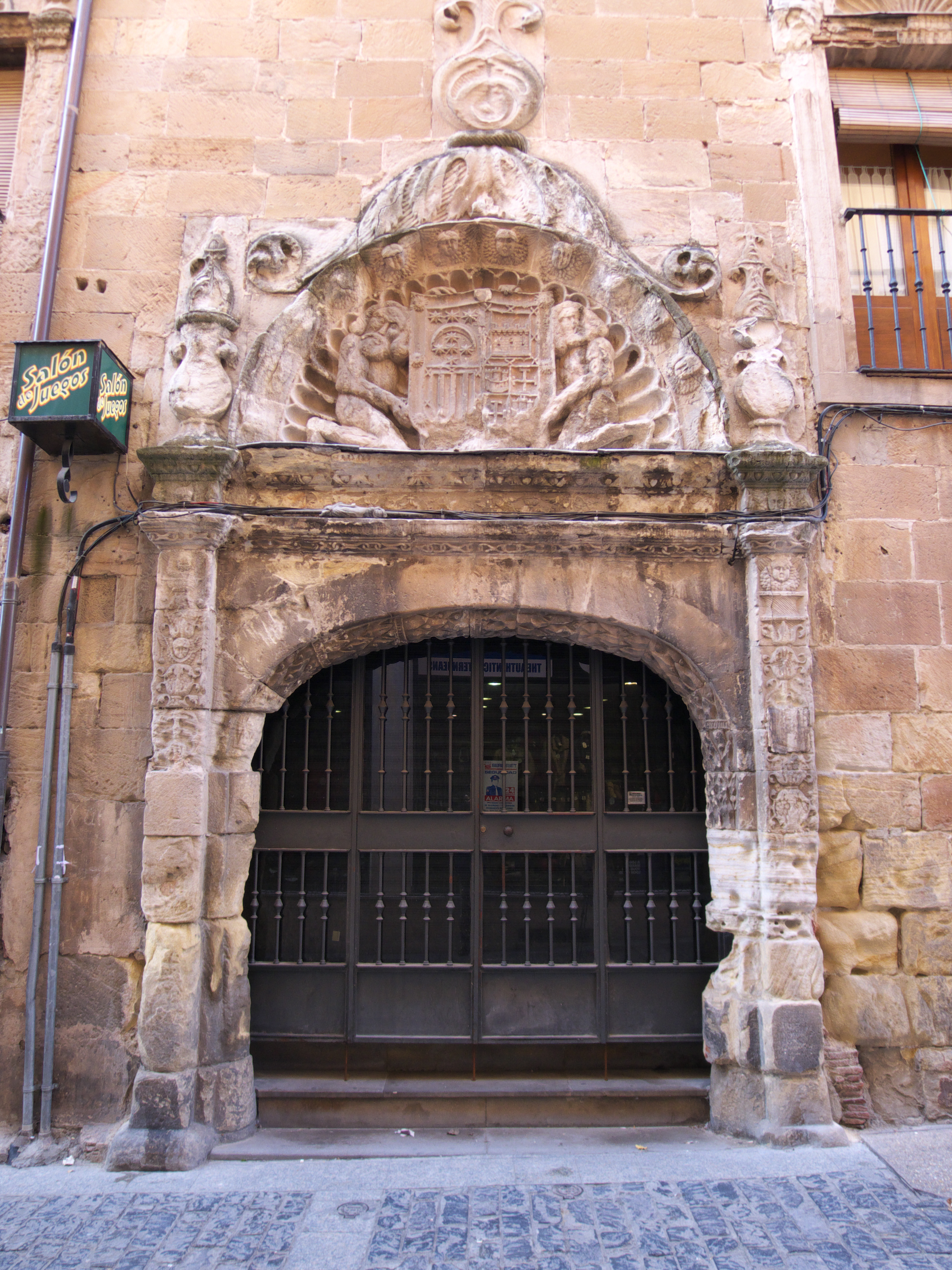
- Former names: Casa de los Clavos

General information
- Town or city: Soria

The Palacio de los Castejones is a plateresque 16th-century palace located in Soria, Spain. It is located at the Aduana Vieja street (street of the old customs) next to other renaissance palaces of the city. It was built by the Castejón family, which is of great weight in this region of Castile. In the nearby village of Agreda, there is another palace called Palacio de los Castejón.

Although its sandstone is badly damaged by the passage of time, its original architecture can still be admired in the 21st century. At this time it is a private dwelling. Stylistically, being plateresque, it resembles another palace in Soria, the Palacio de los Ríos y Salcedo.

The entrance has a segmental arch. The tympanum is decorated by the owner family's coat of arms, held by two wild lambs and two wild men kneeling naked. This façade is inspired by the Palace of the Count of Miranda in Peñaranda de Duero.
