= Edward Nowak =

- Secretary Emeritus of the Congregation for the Causes of Saints
- See: Luni (titular)
- Appointed: 24 February 1990
- Term ended: 5 May 2007
- Predecessor: Traian Crisan
- Successor: Michele Di Ruberto
- Previous posts: Assessor of the Equestrian Order of the Holy Sepulchre of Jerusalem; Canon of St. Peter's Basilica

Orders
- Ordination: 13 January 1963 by Franciszek Barda
- Consecration: 5 April 1990 by Pope John Paul II

Personal details
- Born: 21 February 1940 (age 86) Nowy Żmigród, Poland

Styles of Edward Nowak
- Reference style: The Most Reverend
- Spoken style: Your Excellency
- Religious style: Monsignor
- Posthumous style: n/a

Edward Nowak (born 21 February 1940) is a Polish prelate of the Roman Catholic Church. He served as Assessor of the Equestrian Order of the Holy Sepulchre of Jerusalem and Canon of St. Peter's Basilica.

Nowak was born in Nowy Żmigród, and ordained to the priesthood on 6 January 1963 for the diocese of Przemyśl. In 1990, he was appointed Secretary of the Congregation for the Causes of Saints and was ordained Titular Archbishop of Luni. He received his episcopal consecration on 5 April 1990 from Pope John Paul II, with Archbishops Giovanni Battista Re and Justin Francis Rigali serving as co-consecrators. On 5 May 2007 Pope Benedict XVI named him as Assessor of the Equestrian Order of the Holy Sepulchre of Jerusalem in the Roman Curia.

Preceded by Traian Crişan	Secretary Congregation for the Causes of Saints; February 24, 1990–May 5, 2007	Succeeded by Michele Di Ruberto
Preceded by Andrea Cordero Lanza di Montezemolo	Assessor of the Equestrian Order of the Holy Sepulchre of Jerusalem; 5 May 2007–12 January 2008	Succeeded by Giuseppe De Andrea
