= Traian Crișan =

Traian Crişan
- Secretary of the Congregation for the Causes of Saints; Titular Bishop of Drivastum
- Church: Roman Catholic Church
- In office: 7 December 1981—6 November 1990
- Predecessor: Giuseppe Casoria
- Successor: Edward Nowak

Personal details
- Born: 21 May 1918; Iara, Cluj County, Austria-Hungary (now Romania)
- Died: November 6, 1990 (aged 72)

Styles of Traian Crişan
- Reference style: The Most Reverend
- Spoken style: Your Excellency
- Religious style: Monsignor
- Posthumous style: none

Traian Crişan (21 May 1918 – 6 November 1990) was a Romanian prelate of the Roman Catholic Church and served as Secretary Emeritus of the Congregation for the Causes of Saints as well being the Titular Bishop of Drivastum.

Born in Iara, Austria-Hungary (present-day Romania), Crişan was ordained as a Greek Catholic priest on 25 March 1945. On 7 December 1981 he was appointed to the Holy See as the Secretary of the Congregation for the Causes of Saints and given the title Titular Bishop of Drivastum, going on to being ordained bishop on 6 January 1982.

Bishop Crişan died on 6 November 1990.
