= Giuseppe Casoria =

Italian Cardinal (1908–2001)

Styles of Giuseppe Casoria
- Reference style: His Eminence
- Spoken style: Your Eminence
- Religious style: Monsignor
- Informal style: Cardinal

Giuseppe Casoria (1 October 1908 – 8 February 2001) was an Italian Cardinal of the Roman Catholic Church who served as Prefect of the Congregation for Sacraments and Divine Worship from 1981 to 1984, and elevated to the cardinalate in 1983.

== Early life and priesthood ==
Giuseppe Casoria was born in Acerra to Clemente and Maria (née Russo) Casoria. He was baptized in the cathedral of Acerra by Fr. Vincenzo Montesarchio; his godfather was Vincenzo del Giudice, a friend of the family. After spending his childhood in his native city, he attended the course in sacred theology at the Pontifical Theological Faculty of Southern Italy, the Pontifical Campano Seminary run by the Jesuits in Posillipo. He received a doctorate in sacred theology in 1930, and was ordained a priest by Bishop Francesco Di Pietro on 21 December 1930.

A professor at the seminary of Acerra from 1930 to 1931, Casoria then furthered his studies in Rome at the Pontifical Lateran University, from where he earned a doctorate in philosophy in 1932; at the studium of the Congregation of the Council, earning a diploma in canonical administrative practice in 1934; and at the Pontifical Athenaeum S. Apollinare, earning a doctorate in utroque iuris in 1936. In 1938, he also obtained the diploma of advocate of the Sacred Roman Rota and of the Supreme Tribunal of the Apostolic Signature.

Casoria taught at the seminary of Potenza-Molfetta (1934-1937) before being called to the Roman Curia as an official of the Congregation for the Discipline of the Sacraments. He was defender of the matrimonial bond in the Roman Rota from 1939 to 1952, and became defender of the bond in the ecclesiastical tribunal of Campania in 1941 and advocate in the Congregation of Rites in 1949. He received a degree in political science from the La Sapienza University in 1953.

In 1956, he was promoted to judge of the Tribunal of Appeals of the Vicariate of Rome, referendary prelate of the Apostolic Signatura, and defender of the bond and commissary for matrimonial causes in the Congregation for the Oriental Churches. Casoria later became a consultor of the same Congregation in 1958, and undersecretary adjunct (1959) and undersecretary (1960) of the Congregation for the Discipline of the Sacraments. He was made a voting prelate of the Apostolic Signatura in 1962.

During the Second Vatican Council (1962-1965), he offered his work as a peritus of the preparatory commission for the sacraments, subsequently serving as scrutator and peritus at the Council itself. He was later named qualifier (1964) and commissary for matrimonial causes (1966) in the Supreme Sacred Congregation of the Holy Office.

== Episcopal career ==
On 9 April 1969 Casoria was appointed Secretary of the Congregation for the Discipline of the Sacraments by Pope Paul VI. In virtue of his office as Secretary, he was later named Titular Archbishop of Forum Novum on 6 January 1972. He received his episcopal consecration on the following 13 February from Paul VI himself, with Cardinals Bernard Alfrink and William Conway serving as co-consecrators, at St. Peter's Basilica.

Casoria was appointed Secretary of the Congregation for the Causes of the Saints on 2 February 1973 and later Prefect of the Congregation for the Sacraments and Divine Worship on 24 August 1981.

=== Cardinalate ===
Pope John Paul II created him Cardinal-Deacon of S. Giuseppe in via Trionfale in the consistory of 2 February 1983. He attended the VI Ordinary Assembly of the World Synod of Bishops at the Vatican from September to October 1983. After reaching the mandatory retirement age of 75, Casoria resigned the prefecture of the Congregation for the Sacraments and Divine Worship on 8 April 1984. He lost the right to participate in a papal conclave upon reaching age 80 in October 1988. He later opted for the order of Cardinal Priests and his titular church was elevated pro illa vice on 5 April 1993.

== Death ==
Casoria died at Clinica Pio XI in Rome, at age 92. John Paul II celebrated his funeral Mass at St. Peter's Basilica two days later, on 10 February 2001; his niece and her husband read the two first readings of the liturgy. During the homily, the Pope described Casoria as "a soul in love with Christ, whom he always tried to imitate as a priest, serving him with total dedication in his daily work for the Church." He was later buried in his family's tomb in his native Acerra.

Catholic Church titles
Preceded by Giacomo Violardo	Secretary of the Congregation for the Causes of Saints; 1973–1981	Succeeded by Traian Crişan
Preceded by James Knox	Prefect of the Congregation for Sacraments and Divine Worship; 1981–1984	Succeeded by Paul Mayer, O.S.B.
