= Michele Di Ruberto =

Italian Roman Catholic prelate (1934–2025)

- Secretary Emeritus of the Congregation for the Causes of Saints
- See: Biccari
- Appointed: 5 May 2007
- Term ended: 29 December 2010
- Predecessor: Edward Nowak
- Successor: Celso Morga Iruzubieta
- Other post: Titular Archbishop of Biccari (2007–2025)

Orders
- Ordination: 29 September 1957 by Domenico Vendola
- Consecration: 30 June 2007 by Tarcisio Pietro Evasio Bertone

Personal details
- Born: 28 August 1934 Pietramontecorvino, Italy
- Died: 26 April 2025 (aged 90) Rome, Italy
- Denomination: Roman Catholic

Styles of Michele Di Ruberto
- Reference style: The Most Reverend
- Spoken style: Your Excellency
- Religious style: Monsignor
- Posthumous style: None

Michele Di Ruberto (28 August 1934 – 26 April 2025) was an Italian prelate of the Roman Catholic Church.

Di Ruberto was born in Pietramontecorvino, and was ordained to the priesthood on 29 September 1957. He graduated from the Pontifical Lateran University and the University of Naples, and then entered the Roman Curia in the Congregation for the Causes of Saints in 1969. In 1984, Di Ruberto was placed in charge of verifying miracles attributed to candidates for canonization, and in 1993 was named the Congregation's Undersecretary.

On 5 May 2007, he was appointed Secretary of Causes of Saints and Titular Archbishop of Biccari by Pope Benedict XVI. He received his episcopal consecration on the following 30 June from Cardinal Secretary of State Tarcisio Bertone, SDB, with Cardinal José Saraiva Martins and Bishop Francesco Zerrillo serving as co-consecrators.

Di Ruberto was an expert in canon and civil law. He died in Rome on 26 April 2025, at the age of 90.

Catholic Church titles
Preceded by Edward Nowak	Secretary of the Congregation for the Causes of Saints; 2007–2010	Succeeded by Marcello Bartolucci
Preceded by First	Titular Archbishop of Biccari; 2007–2025	Succeeded by Vacant
