= Fabio Fabene =

Italian archbishop

The Most Reverend Fabio Fabene
- Secretary of the Dicastery for the Causes of Saints
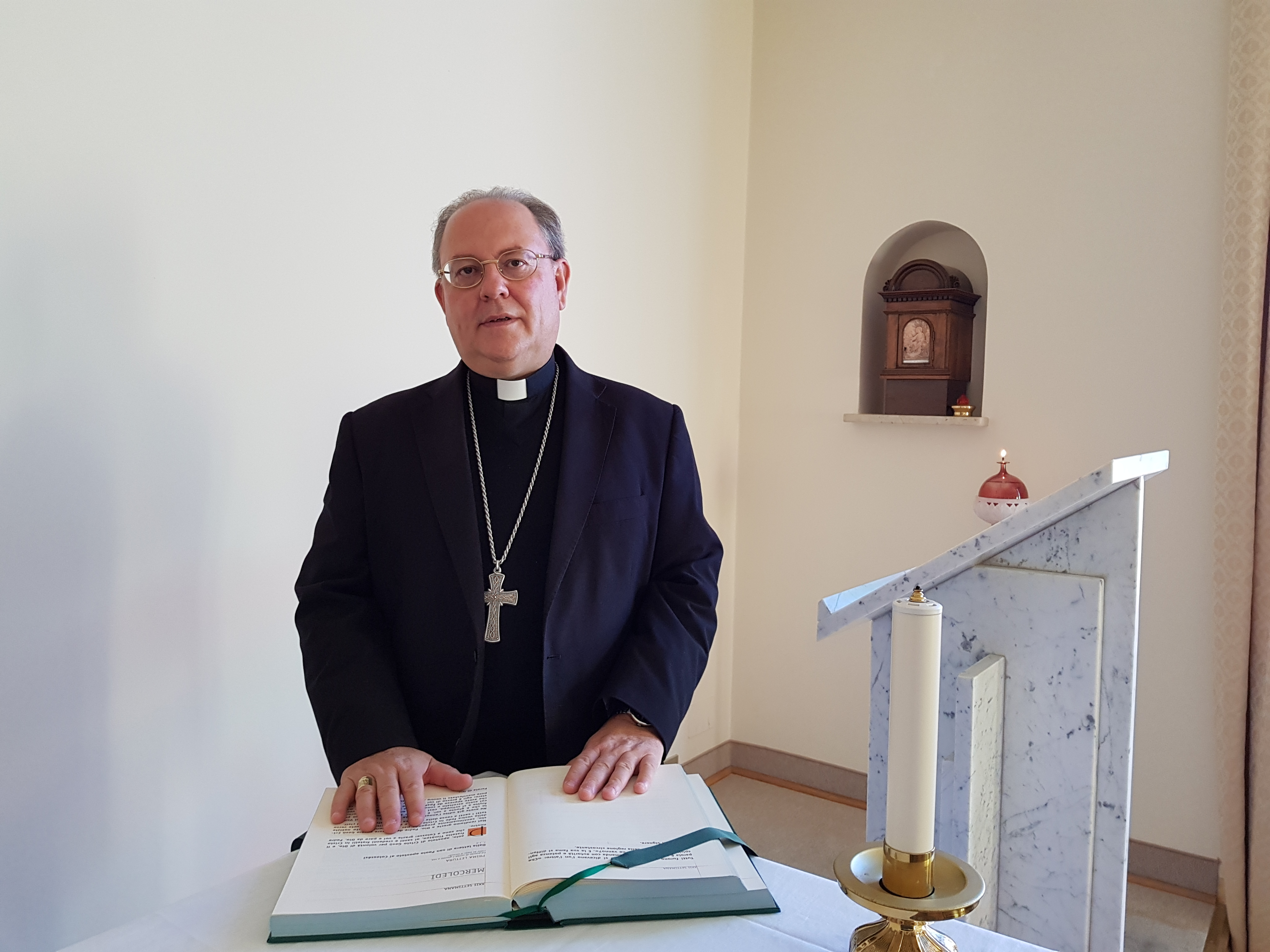
- Fabene on 10 November 2017.
- Church: Roman Catholic Church
- Appointed: 18 January 2021
- Predecessor: Marcello Bartolucci
- Other post: Titular Bishop of Montefiascone (2017-)
- Previous posts: Titular Bishop of Acquapendente (2014-17); Under-Secretary of the Synod of Bishops (2014–2021)

Orders
- Ordination: 26 May 1984 by Luigi Boccadoro
- Consecration: 30 May 2014 by Pope Francis

Personal details
- Born: Fabio Fabene; 12 March 1959 (age 67) Rome, Italy
- Denomination: Catholic (Roman Rite)
- Education: Pontifical Lateran University
- Motto: In communione gaudium ("In the communion of joy")
- Coat of arms

Fabio Fabene (born 12 March 1959) is an Italian prelate of the Catholic Church who has been the secretary of the Dicastery for the Causes of Saints since January 2021. He was under-secretary of the Synod of Bishops from 2014 to 2021. He was consecrated a bishop on 30 May 2014.

== Biography ==
=== Early life ===
Fabene studied at the minor seminary in the diocese of Montefiascone. He went on to complete his studies in theology at the Pontifical Regional Seminary in Viterbo and was ordained a priest for the diocese of Montefiascone on 26 May 1984. He was sent to Rome where he earned a doctorate in Canon law (JCD) from the Pontifical Lateran University.

=== Career ===
He did pastoral work in the diocese and was later appointed chancellor, serving from 1984 until 1998. After this appointment, he taught canon law. On 1 January 1998, he entered the service of the Roman Curia serving in the Congregation for Bishops where he went on to become head of office in 2010. Since 1996 he worked as a judge in the marriage tribunal of Lazio for the Diocese of Rome.

Ordination history of Fabio Fabene
History
Priestly ordination
- Ordained by: Luigi Boccadoro
Episcopal consecration
- Principal consecrator: Pope Francis
- Co-consecrators: Giovanni Battista Re; Lorenzo Baldisseri

Styles of Fabio Fabene
- Reference style: The Most Reverend
- Spoken style: Your Excellency
- Religious style: Bishop

Pope Francis named him Under-Secretary of the Synod of Bishops on 8 February 2014 and appointed him titular bishop of Acquapendente on 8 April. He was consecrated by Pope Francis on 30 May 2014. In 2017 he was transferred to the titular diocese of Montefiascone.

On 18 January 2021, he was named secretary of the Congregation for the Causes of Saints. On the same day he was appointed to the personal rank of Archbishop with the same title.

=== Other ===
Fabene serves as the postulator in the cause of canonization of Venerable Marcantonio Barbarigo (1640-1706).
