= Marcello Bartolucci =

Italian prelate of the Catholic Church

The Most Reverend Marcello Bartolucci
- Secretary Emeritus of the Congregation for the Causes of Saints
- Church: Roman Catholic Church
- Appointed: 29 December 2010
- Term ended: 18 January 2021
- Predecessor: Michele Di Ruberto
- Successor: Fabio Fabene
- Other post: Titular Archbishop of Mevania (2010-)

Orders
- Ordination: 9 November 1968 by Giuseppe Placido Maria Nicolini
- Consecration: 5 February 2011 by Pope Benedict XVI

Personal details
- Born: Marcello Bartolucci; 9 April 1944 (age 82) Bastia Umbra, Kingdom of Italy
- Denomination: Roman Catholic

Styles of Marcello Bartolucci
- Reference style: The Most Reverend
- Spoken style: Your Excellency
- Religious style: Archbishop

Marcello Bartolucci (born 9 April 1944) is an Italian prelate of the Catholic Church. He has held the rank of archbishop since 2011 and was the Secretary of the Congregation for the Causes of Saints from 2010 to 2021. He held several other posts in that Congregation beginning in 1977.

== Biography ==
Bartolucci was born in 1944 in Bastia Umbra in the diocese of Assisi. He studied philosophy and theology and the regional seminary and was ordained on 9 November 1968. He received his doctorate in theology and a Diploma in Pastoral Theology, specializing in catechesis from the Pontifical Lateran University and a licentiate in canon law at the Pontifical University of Saint Thomas Aquinas, Angelicum in Rome.

After ten years of pastoral experience, first as curate and then as parish priest, with a number of positions within the diocese, and also as a teacher of religion in state schools in 1977, he joined the Congregation for the Causes of Saints, in the service of the Office of the Judicial Ministry. Following the reform of the Congregation and the process in 1983, he collaborated with various superiors that have followed in the preparation of opinions on individual cases in the study of processes and practices in the Secretariat.

For over twenty years, he was in charge of drafting the decrees on the virtues, martyrdom and miracles, both in Italian and Latin, for publication on "Acta Apostolicae Sedis". He was also responsible for writing in the Italian Papal Bulls of canonisation and Briefs Apostolic beatification. He served as Secretary of the Commission for the revision of the rite of beatification. He taught at the "Studium" of the congregation.

He was appointed Under-Secretary of Congregation on 14 July 2007 and served in that capacity until 29 December 2010 when Pope Benedict appointed him Titular Archbishop of Mevania and secretary of the Congregation. He was consecrated on 5 February 2011 by Pope Benedict. The co-consecrators were Cardinals Angelo Sodano and Tarcisio Bertone, SDB. He was confirmed in his position as secretary by Pope Francis on 19 December 2013.

He was succeeded as secretary by Fabio Fabene on 18 January 2021.
