= Soria =

- Municipality
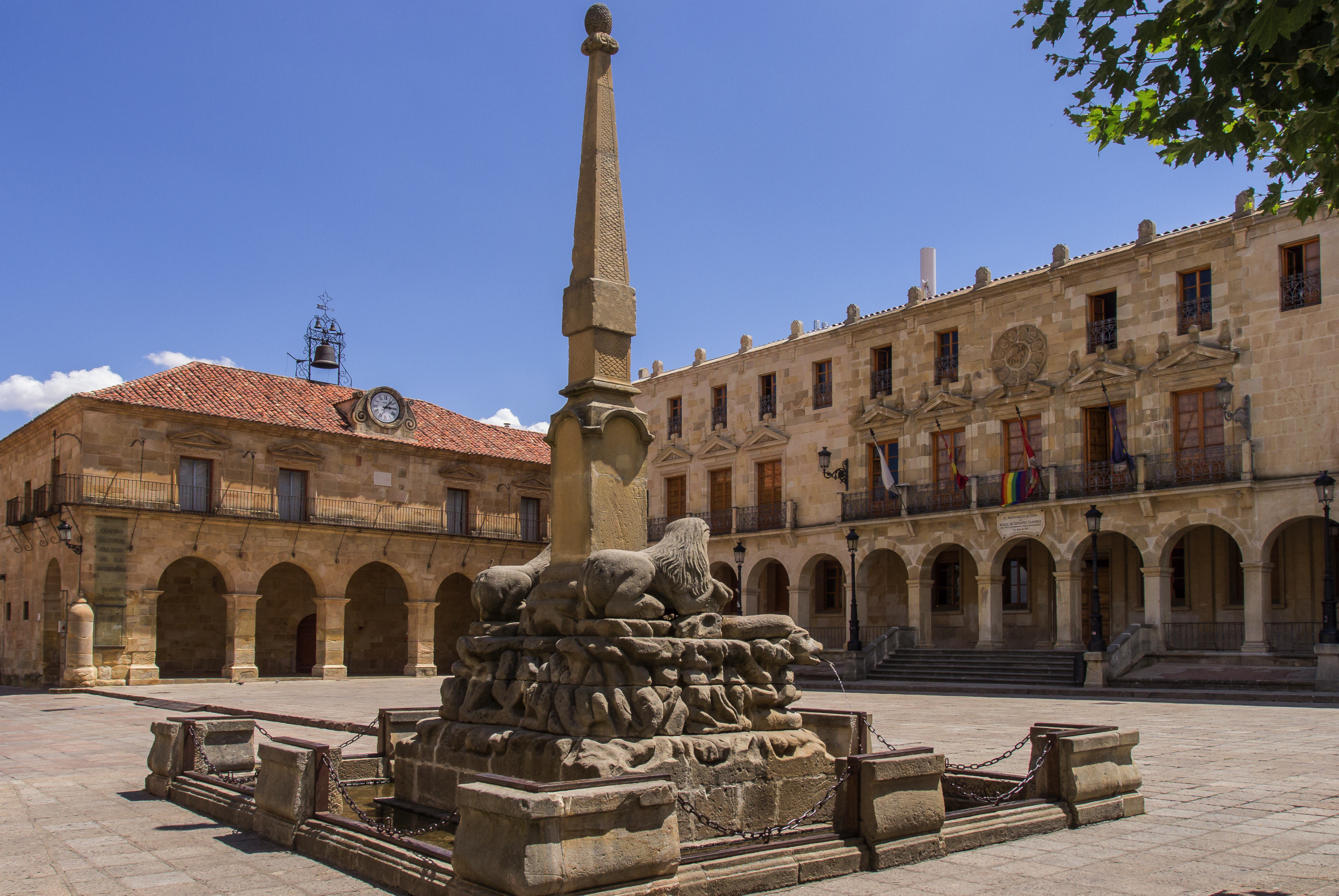
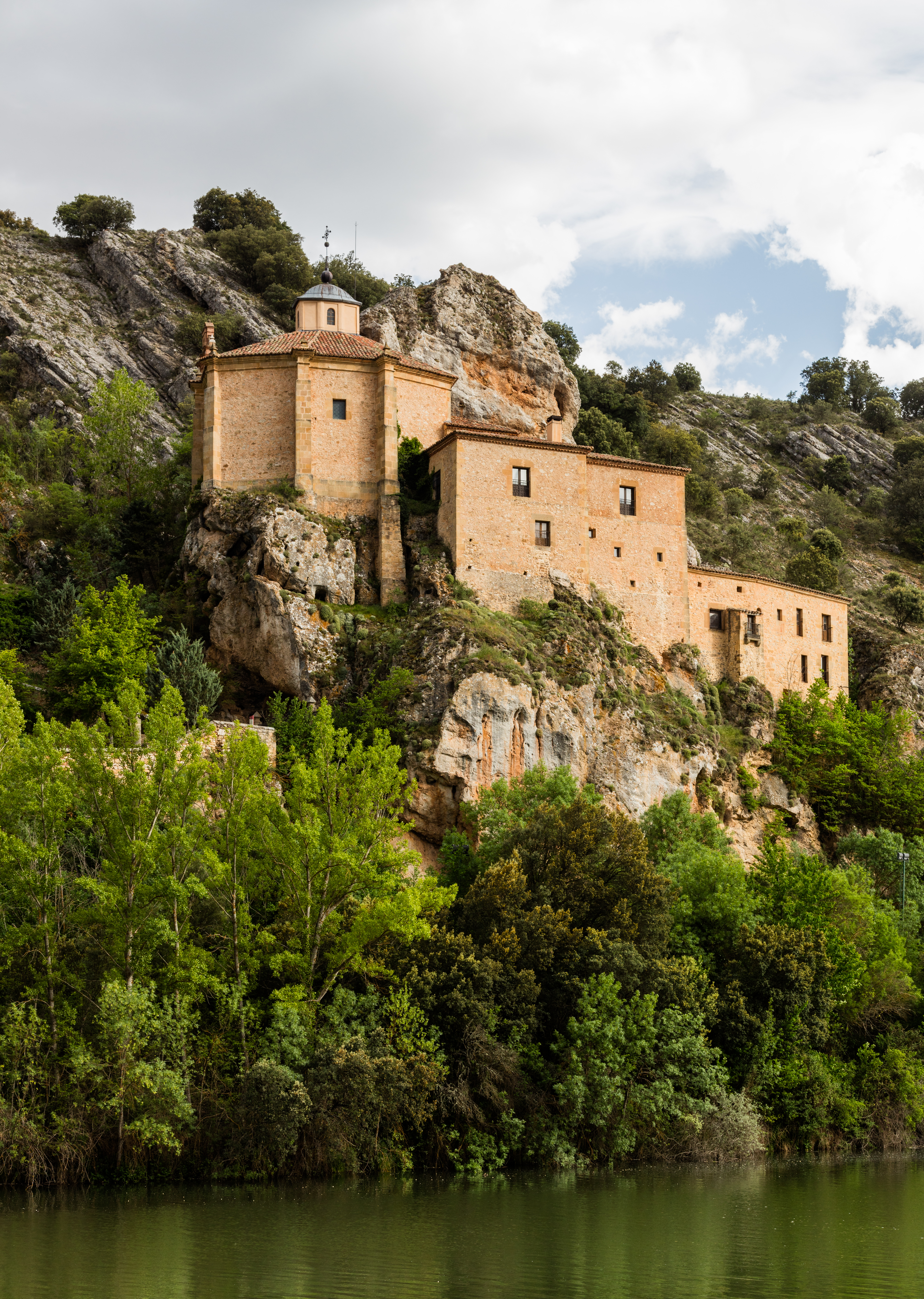
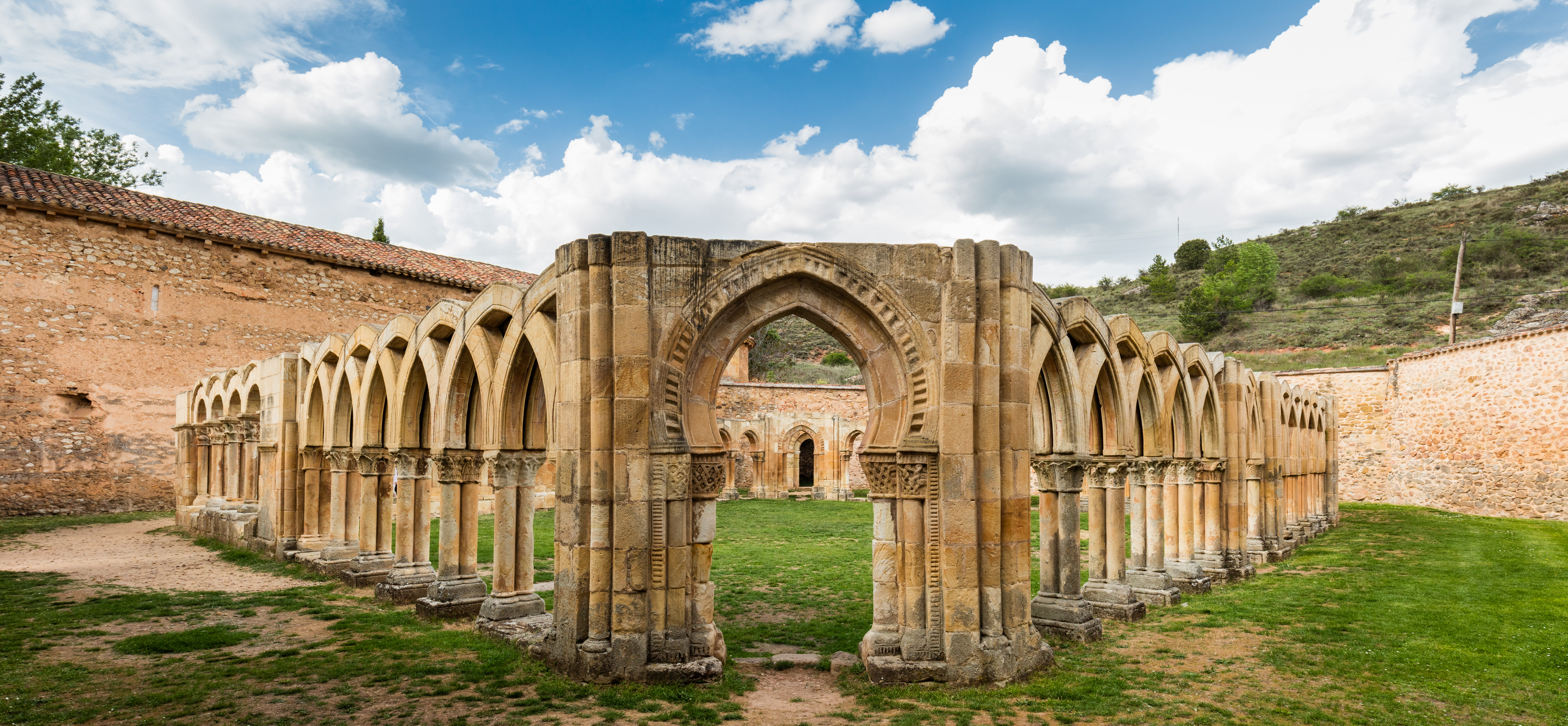
- Plaza Mayor San Saturio shrine Monastery of San Juan de Duero

- Flag Coat of arms
- Motto: Soria Pura, Cabeza de Estremadura.
- Location of Soria
- Coordinates: 41°46′N 2°28′W
- Country: Spain
- Autonomous community: Castile and León
- Province: Soria

Government
  - Mayor: Javier Antón Cacho (PSOE)

Area
  - Total: 259.67 km^{2} (100.26 sq mi)
- Elevation: 1,065 m (3,494 ft)

Population (2025)
  - Total: 40,941
  - Density: 157.67/km^{2} (408.35/sq mi)
- Time zone: UTC+1 (CET)
  - Summer (DST): UTC+2 (CEST)
- Website: Official website

Soria (Spanish pronunciation: [ˈsoɾja]) is a city and municipality in the autonomous community of Castile and León in Spain, and capital of the province of Soria, located on the Douro river. It has a population of 40,941, representing 45.4% of the provincial population as of 2025. Situated at about 1,065 meters above sea level, Soria is the second highest provincial capital in Spain.

Although there are remains of settlements from the Iron Age and Celtiberian times, Soria itself enters history with its repopulation between 1109 and 1114, by the Aragonese king Alfonso I the Battler. A strategic enclave due to the struggles for territory between the kingdoms of Castile, Navarre and Aragon, Soria became part of Castile definitively in 1134, during the reign of Alfonso VII. Alfonso VIII was born in Soria, and Alfonso X had his court established when he received the offer to the throne of the Holy Roman Empire. In Soria, the deposed king James IV of Mallorca died, and John I of Castile married. Booming during the Late Middle Ages thanks to its border location and its control over the cattle industry, Soria went into a slow decline over the next few centuries. It was damaged greatly during the Peninsular War.

The city preserves an important architectural heritage (extensive medieval walls, Renaissance palaces and architecturally distinctive Romanesque churches) and is home to the Numantine Museum (with pieces from the nearby Celtiberian city of Numantia). Soria's football team CD Numancia is named after this city. It is one of the smallest cities to ever have had a team in Spain's top division La Liga.

Particularly important in its economy is the agri-food industry, while an increasing number of tourists are attracted by its cultural heritage. Soria was mentioned by UNESCO as a good example when including the Mediterranean diet in its Representative List of the Intangible Cultural Heritage of Humanity.

== Etymology ==
It is claimed that in Roman times there was a castle called Oria, purportedly named after a Greek knight called Doricus. Based on this folk etymology, some historians guessed that the first inhabitants of this city might have been the Dorians. Archaeology has not confirmed that story. Instead it has suggested that the first inhabitants were the Suebi, whose kings (as reported by Tutor and Malo in their Compedio historial de las dos Numancias) established one of their courts there. These two hypotheses have been abandoned because of lack of evidence. It seems more likely that the name Soria may have its origin in the word dauria from the river Durius (Douro).

== History ==
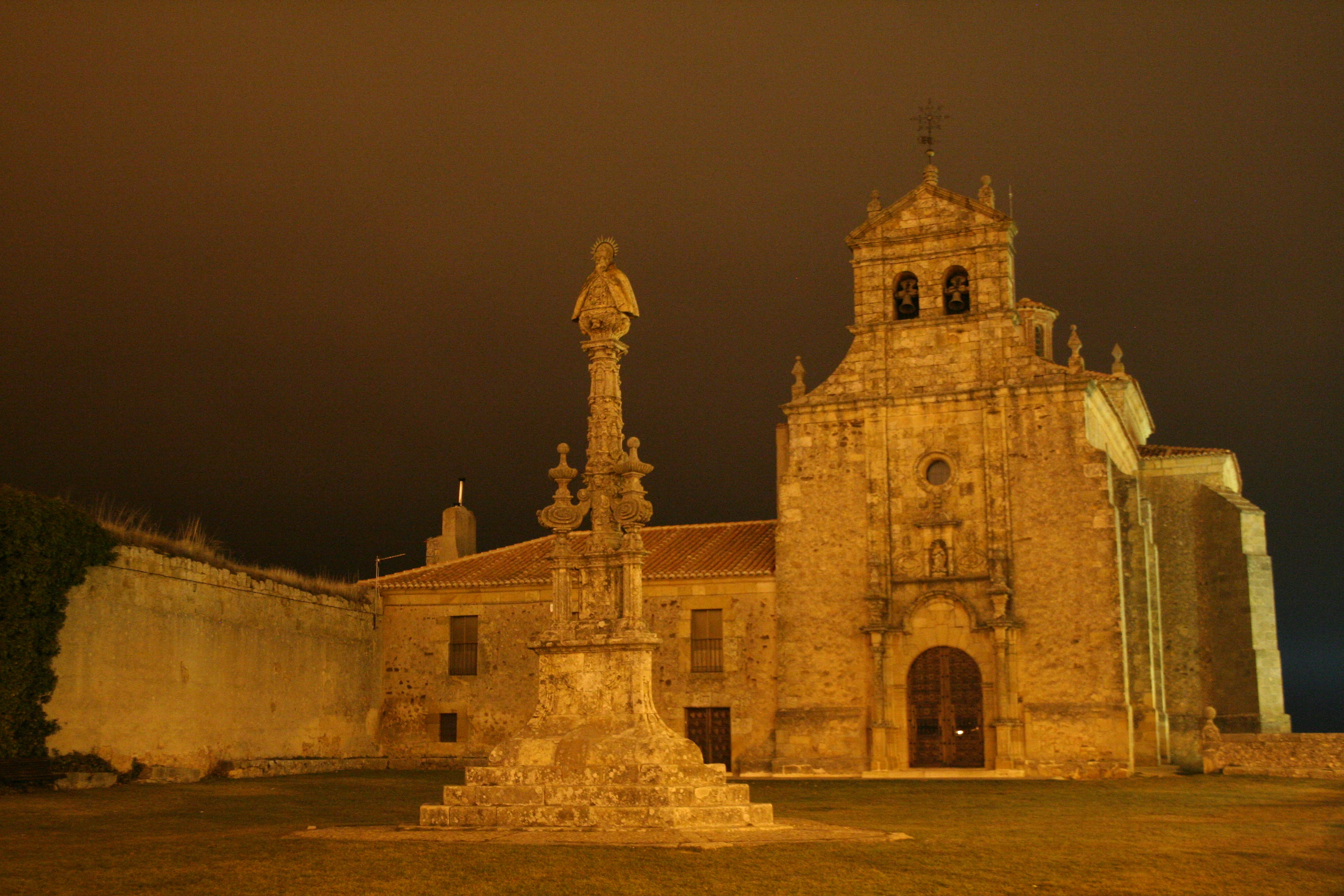
Madonna del Mirón Hermitage, whose construction was begun in the 6th century by the Suebi.

The first recorded inhabitants in the area of Soria were the Celtiberians, around the 4th century BC.

After the fall of the Western Roman Empire, the rebuilt city was occupied by the Suebi. Later, after the Arab conquest of Spain, it grew in importance due to its proximity to the border of the Christian lands, which in the 8th century had settled along the Duero river.

In 869 Soria was the centre of the rebellion of Suleyman ibn-Abus against the emir of Córdoba, who sent his son Hakan to quench it.

Alfonso I of Aragon and Navarre, the Battler seized the territory away from the sphere of the Kingdom of León, controlling the territory from 1109 to 1134, entrusting the role of first tenant of Soria to Íñigo López already by 1119, when the effective repopulation should have started, although there are claims tracing it back some time earlier. Soria was granted a short fuero in March 1120, that also fixed limits to the medieval concejo. After the death of Alfonso I in 1134, Alfonso VII of León, the Emperor took control of the territory. The short fuero was confirmed by Alfonso VII in 1143.

Due to its strategic placement at the borders of the Kingdoms of Castile, Aragon, Navarre and León, Soria in the Middle Ages was at the centre of several conflicts between them. Alfonso VIII of Castile, in reward for its support, gave the city several privileges which it maintained until modern times. In 1195 the town was stormed by Sancho VII of Navarre, but later recovered and continued to develop its splendour and trades.

Soria lost most of its importance after the unification of Aragón and Castile in 1479, and above all after the decree of exile issued against the Jews in 1492. In the War of Spanish Succession (early 18th century), Soria sided for Philip V. In 1808 it was captured and set on fire by the French troops.

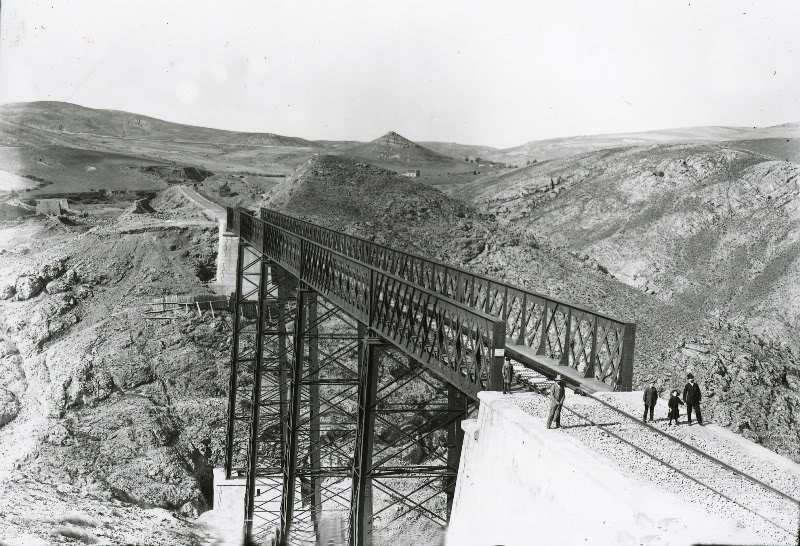
The iron viaduct over the Golmayo river c. 1890

The economical and social crisis of Spain in the early 20th century, and the Spanish Civil War with Francisco Franco's dictatorship which followed, had negative effects on Soria and its neighborhood, which became depopulated due to strong emigration.

The policy of the current authorities aims to strengthen the local economy pivoting on Soria's tourism potential, and has also launched a programme of reconstruction for the neighbouring villages.

== Geography ==
The municipality has a highly irregular shape

Soria sits on the banks of Douro river, in its upper course. Its municipality is formed by the city, and four rural hamlets: Las Casas, Oteruelos, Pedrajas and Toledillo; both Oteruelos and Pedrajas were small municipalities later absorbed by Soria by the 1970s. The shape of the municipality is highly irregular and it is not even continuous, as it comprises three disjointed areas.

=== Climate ===
Soria has an oceanic climate (Köppen: Cfb). Due to its altitude, winters in Soria are very cold by Spanish standards (3.6 °C (38 °F) in January) with an average of 83 frost days per year. Summers are dry and warm (average 20.7 °C (69 °F) in July) with the daytime temperature usually around 29 °C (84 °F). Temperatures above 35 °C (95 °F) are not rare in summer, while lows can go under 10 °C (50 °F) at nights. It has scant rainfall (535 millimetres (21.1 in)) and spring is the wettest season. The low rainfall is in spite of its high elevation as the maritime Atlantic low-pressure systems are often blocked by the mountains closer to the coast. It is the coldest Spanish provincial capital.

Climate data for Soria (1991–2020) 1,082 m., extremes (1943-present)
Month	Jan	Feb	Mar	Apr	May	Jun	Jul	Aug	Sep	Oct	Nov	Dec	Year
Record high °C (°F)	20.8 (69.4)	23.2 (73.8)	25.5 (77.9)	30.0 (86.0)	32.7 (90.9)	37.9 (100.2)	38.7 (101.7)	38.9 (102.0)	36.4 (97.5)	31.8 (89.2)	25.0 (77.0)	20.5 (68.9)	38.9 (102.0)
Mean daily maximum °C (°F)	8.2 (46.8)	9.7 (49.5)	13.2 (55.8)	15.0 (59.0)	19.5 (67.1)	25.0 (77.0)	28.9 (84.0)	28.7 (83.7)	23.5 (74.3)	17.8 (64.0)	11.6 (52.9)	8.9 (48.0)	17.5 (63.5)
Daily mean °C (°F)	3.6 (38.5)	4.4 (39.9)	7.2 (45.0)	9.1 (48.4)	13.1 (55.6)	17.6 (63.7)	20.7 (69.3)	20.6 (69.1)	16.4 (61.5)	11.9 (53.4)	6.9 (44.4)	4.2 (39.6)	11.3 (52.4)
Mean daily minimum °C (°F)	−1.1 (30.0)	−0.9 (30.4)	1.3 (34.3)	3.2 (37.8)	6.6 (43.9)	10.2 (50.4)	12.5 (54.5)	12.5 (54.5)	9.3 (48.7)	6.0 (42.8)	2.1 (35.8)	−0.5 (31.1)	5.1 (41.2)
Record low °C (°F)	−14.0 (6.8)	−14.0 (6.8)	−12.8 (9.0)	−5.6 (21.9)	−4.0 (24.8)	0.0 (32.0)	1.2 (34.2)	1.0 (33.8)	−1.2 (29.8)	−4.2 (24.4)	−9.6 (14.7)	−15.0 (5.0)	−15.0 (5.0)
Average precipitation mm (inches)	42.7 (1.68)	34.7 (1.37)	41.8 (1.65)	59.1 (2.33)	63.5 (2.50)	47.6 (1.87)	34.2 (1.35)	26.0 (1.02)	33.2 (1.31)	57.7 (2.27)	49.5 (1.95)	45.2 (1.78)	535.2 (21.08)
Average precipitation days (≥ 1 mm)	7.2	6.1	7.3	8.9	8.9	6.0	3.8	3.3	5.2	7.8	8.0	7.0	79.5
Average snowy days	5.3	5.8	4.3	2.1	0.2	0.0	0.0	0.0	0.0	0.2	2.2	3.1	23.2
Average relative humidity (%)	76	69	63	63	60	53	48	49	59	68	75	78	63
Mean monthly sunshine hours	143	161	205	219	257	297	341	319	243	189	147	133	2,654
Percentage possible sunshine	48	54	55	54	57	65	74	74	65	55	49	47	58
Source: Agencia Estatal de Meteorologia

Climate data for Soria (1981–2010) 1,082 m.
Month	Jan	Feb	Mar	Apr	May	Jun	Jul	Aug	Sep	Oct	Nov	Dec	Year
Record high °C (°F)	20.0 (68.0)	21.2 (70.2)	24.4 (75.9)	28.0 (82.4)	32.7 (90.9)	37.0 (98.6)	38.0 (100.4)	37.4 (99.3)	36.4 (97.5)	30.6 (87.1)	25.0 (77.0)	20.5 (68.9)	38.0 (100.4)
Mean daily maximum °C (°F)	7.7 (45.9)	9.6 (49.3)	13.2 (55.8)	14.6 (58.3)	18.7 (65.7)	24.6 (76.3)	28.7 (83.7)	28.3 (82.9)	23.6 (74.5)	17.4 (63.3)	11.5 (52.7)	8.4 (47.1)	17.2 (63.0)
Daily mean °C (°F)	3.2 (37.8)	4.3 (39.7)	7.1 (44.8)	8.7 (47.7)	12.5 (54.5)	17.2 (63.0)	20.5 (68.9)	20.3 (68.5)	16.4 (61.5)	11.6 (52.9)	6.7 (44.1)	4.0 (39.2)	11.0 (51.9)
Mean daily minimum °C (°F)	−1.3 (29.7)	−1.0 (30.2)	1.0 (33.8)	2.8 (37.0)	6.2 (43.2)	9.9 (49.8)	12.4 (54.3)	12.2 (54.0)	9.3 (48.7)	5.8 (42.4)	1.9 (35.4)	−0.4 (31.3)	4.9 (40.8)
Record low °C (°F)	−14.0 (6.8)	−14.0 (6.8)	−12.8 (9.0)	−5.6 (21.9)	−4.0 (24.8)	0.0 (32.0)	1.2 (34.2)	1.0 (33.8)	−1.2 (29.8)	−4.2 (24.4)	−9.6 (14.7)	−15.0 (5.0)	−15.0 (5.0)
Average precipitation mm (inches)	37 (1.5)	36 (1.4)	30 (1.2)	55 (2.2)	67 (2.6)	40 (1.6)	30 (1.2)	30 (1.2)	33 (1.3)	55 (2.2)	50 (2.0)	50 (2.0)	513 (20.4)
Average precipitation days (≥ 1)	7	6	6	9	10	6	4	4	5	8	8	8	81
Average snowy days	5	5	3	3	0	0	0	0	0	0	2	4	22
Mean monthly sunshine hours	138	158	202	208	244	293	339	313	233	180	143	126	2,577
Source: AEMET

== Demographics ==
Historical population
Year	Pop.	±%
1842	5,730	—
1857	6,228	+8.7%
1877	6,790	+9.0%
1887	8,038	+18.4%
1900	7,928	−1.4%
1910	8,649	+9.1%
1920	8,316	−3.9%
1930	10,788	+29.7%
1940	13,897	+28.8%
1950	16,753	+20.6%
1960	19,799	+18.2%
1970	24,659	+24.5%
1981	30,326	+23.0%
1991	32,360	+6.7%
2001	35,151	+8.6%
2011	40,286	+14.6%
2021	39,739	−1.4%
Source: INE

As of 2025, the population is 40,941, of which 47.3% are male, and 52.7% are female. Minors make up 16.9% of the population, and seniors make up 22.4%.

=== Immigration ===
As of 2025, immigrants make up 20.8% of the population. The 5 largest foreign countries of birth are Venezuela, Colombia, Ecuador, Peru, and Dominican Republic.

Foreign population by country of birth (2025)
Country	Population
Venezuela	955
Colombia	840
Ecuador	823
Peru	670
Dominican Republic	640
Argentina	541
Bolivia	525
Morocco	522
Bulgaria	340
Romania	277
Ukraine	211
Honduras	174
Brazil	158
The Gambia	153
Senegal	124

== Symbols ==
The shield of Soria has the following heraldic description:

In a field of gules (red), a castle, of argent, crenellated with three battlements, lined up and marbled with sabre, rinsed with azure (blue) and a king's bust crowned with gold and with its attributes coming out of his homage, in its colour; silver embroidery loaded with the following legend: "Soria Pura Cabeza de Estremadura", written in sable (black) letters.

The king in the coat of arms is Alfonso VIII, born in Soria, and the red field represents the blood shed by the Sorians, particularly in the battles of Alarcos, Navas de Tolosa and Aljubarrota.

The oldest preserved example of the coat of arms is found in the high-medieval bell of San Gil, today the Church of Nuestra Señora de la Mayor, which already reflected the city's motto. Unlike the current official coat of arms, the king who now appears on the bust of the castle's keep on the castle's bell tower, is represented in the bell of San Gil with his entire body at the foot of the castle, leaving through its door.

== Culture ==
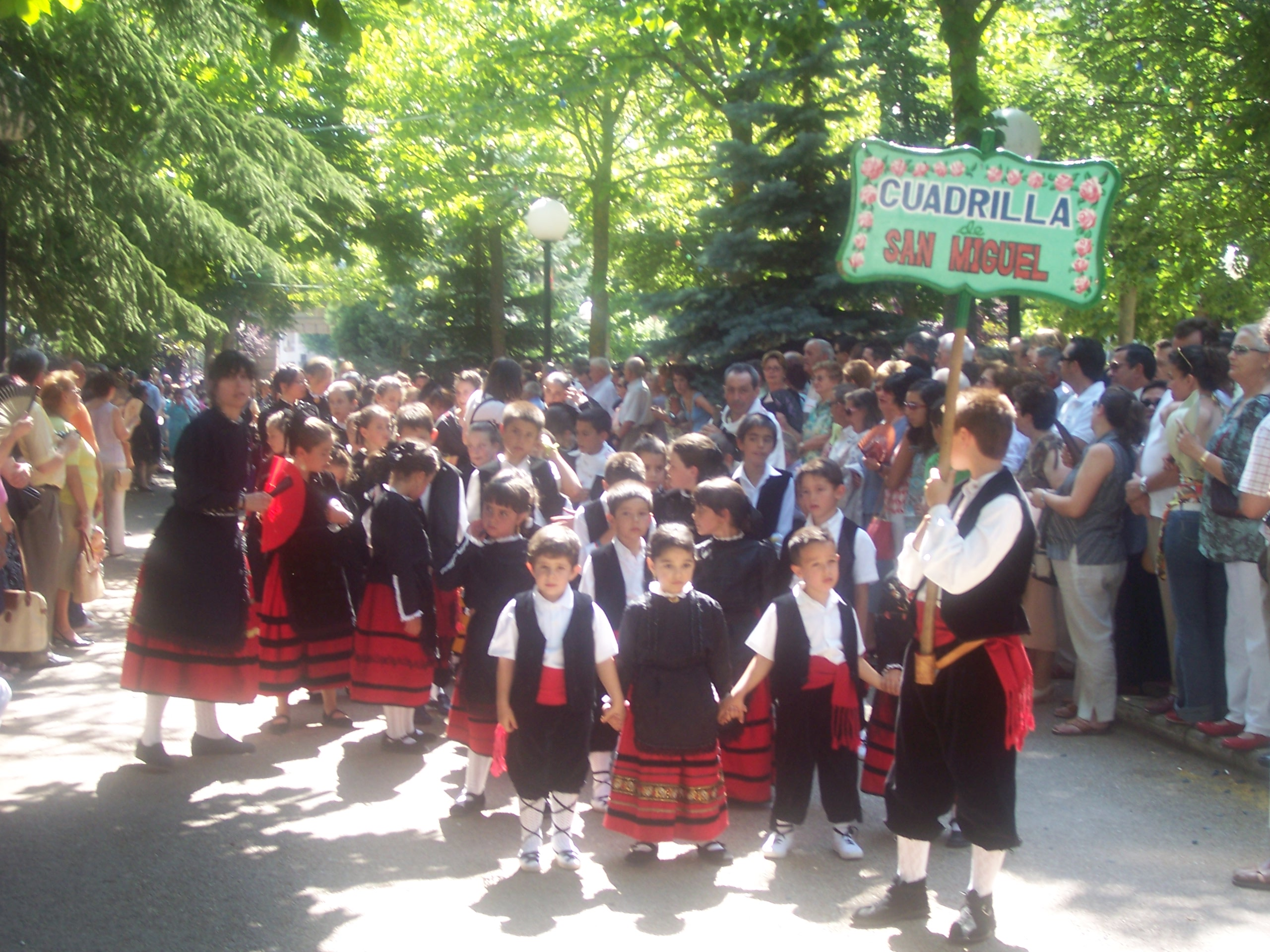
San Juan's feast day in Soria.

The poet Antonio Machado (1875–1939) spent five years in Soria teaching French in a secondary school, before moving to Segovia nearer Madrid. These years in Soria proved significant in his literary development. He married and lost his wife there and discovered much about the nature of the Castilian people – a subject the Generation of '98 authors were very interested in. Campos de Soria was a series of poems lamenting his wife's early death. They formed part of a major collection Campos de Castilla.

The firewalking rituals performed at the Sorian village of San Pedro Manrique every June as part of the festival of San Juan have been declared as a tradition of National Tourist Interest and have attracted global attention through ethnographic and scientific studies and media coverage.

=== Religion ===
Although Soria never was a bishopric, its St. Peter's Church became the Co-Cathedral of the bishopric of Osma when that was renamed Roman Catholic Diocese of Osma-Soria on 9 March 1959. The province of Soria has a Minor Basilica, the Marian Basílica de Nuestra Señora de los Milagros, in Ágreda.

== Main sights ==
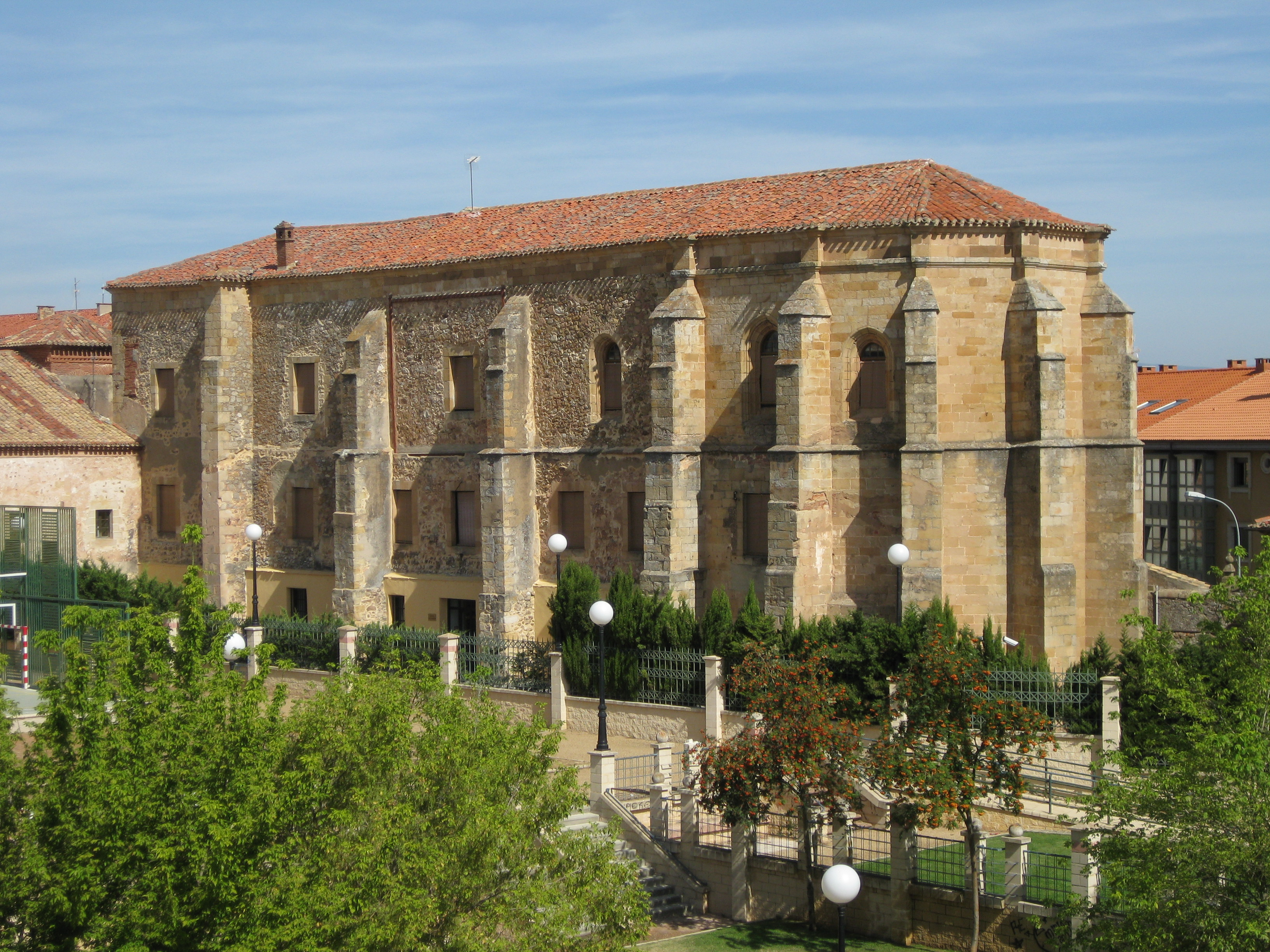
Santa Clara Convent, founded in 1224.

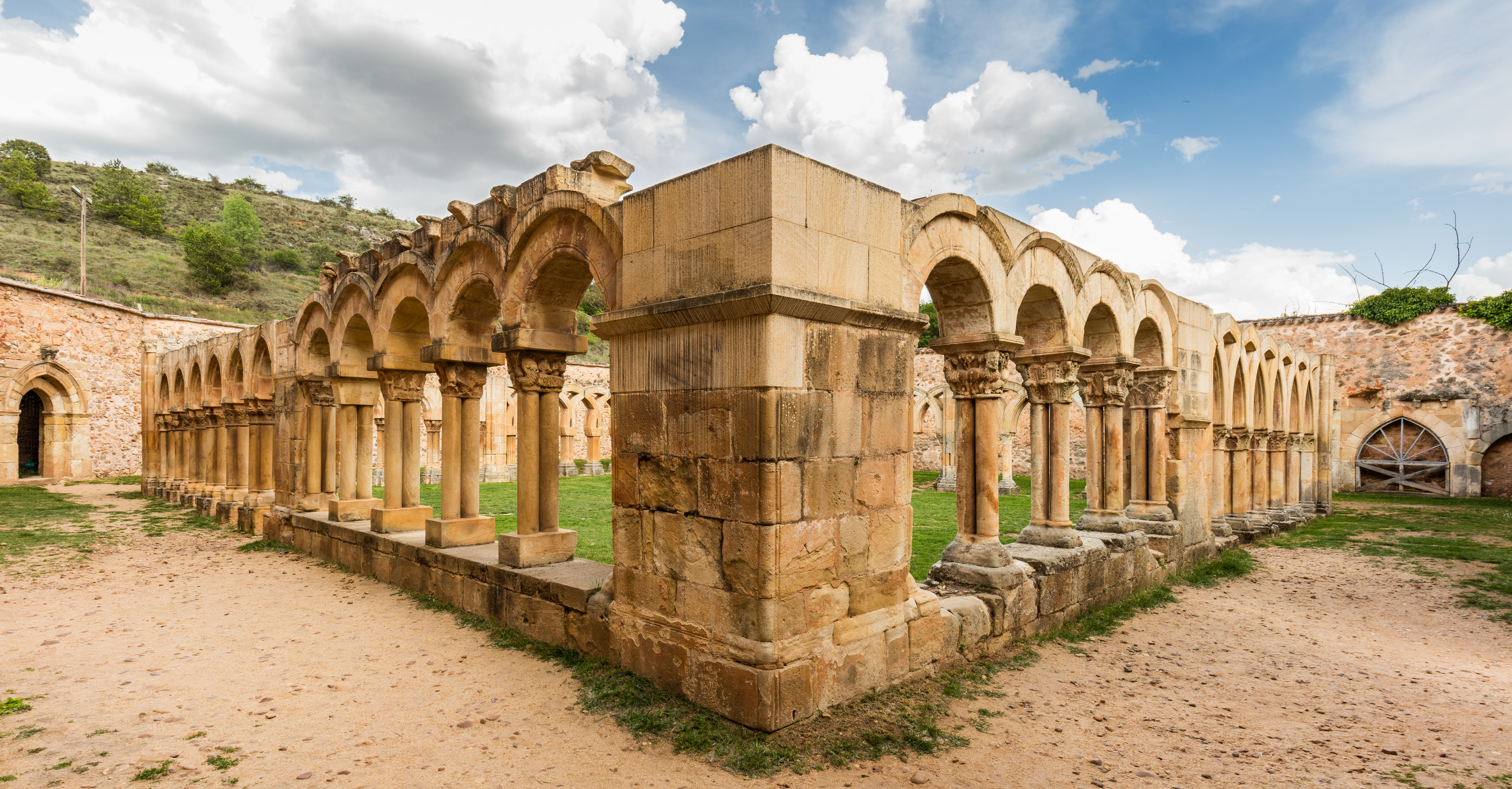
Monastery of San Juan de Duero

Ecclesiastical

- Plateresque Concatedral de San Pedro, erected in the 12th-13th centuries, rebuilt in the 16th century, and its cloister.
- San Juan de Rabanera, Romanesque church from the 12th century
- San Polo, a former monastery of the Knights Templar. The churches of San Nicolás and San Ginés are from the same age.
- the Romanesque convent church of Santo Domingo (12th century)
- Nuestra Señora de la Mayor (16th century), with a Romanesque portal
- Iglesia del Espino (16th century)
- San Juan de Duero with its 12th century ruined cloisters located on the other side of the river from the old town.
- The sanctuaries of Ermita de San Saturio (18th century) and Ermita de la Soledad (17th century).
- The Ermita de Nuestra Señora del Mirón (Hermitage of Our Lady of Miron), with a baroque/rococo interior, founded - according to legend - by Theodemar in the sixth century. Since September 2009 the building has been used by a Romanian Orthodox parish.

Other

- The Renaissance Ayuntamiento (Town Hall, 16th century), in the Plaza Mayor (main square)
- Palacio de la Audiencia (theatre), from 1739
- Palacio de los condes de Gomara (Judiciary Palace, 1592)
- remains of the medieval castle, commanding the town from the eponymous hill, and of the walls
- The Church of San Nicolás de Soria (Spanish: Iglesia de San Nicolás) is a ruined remnant of a Romanesque-style church. It was declared Bien de Interés Cultural in 1962.
- Aduana Vieja street, with its rennaissance noble houses: the Palace of the Castejones, the Palace of Don Diego Solier and the Palace of the Viscounts of Eza.

A few kilometres north of the town are the ruins of Numantia, a Celtiberian town whose inhabitants destroyed it rather than let it fall to Scipio. In Soria is the Museo Numantino, devoted to the archaeological remains of this and other sites in the province.

== Municipal services ==
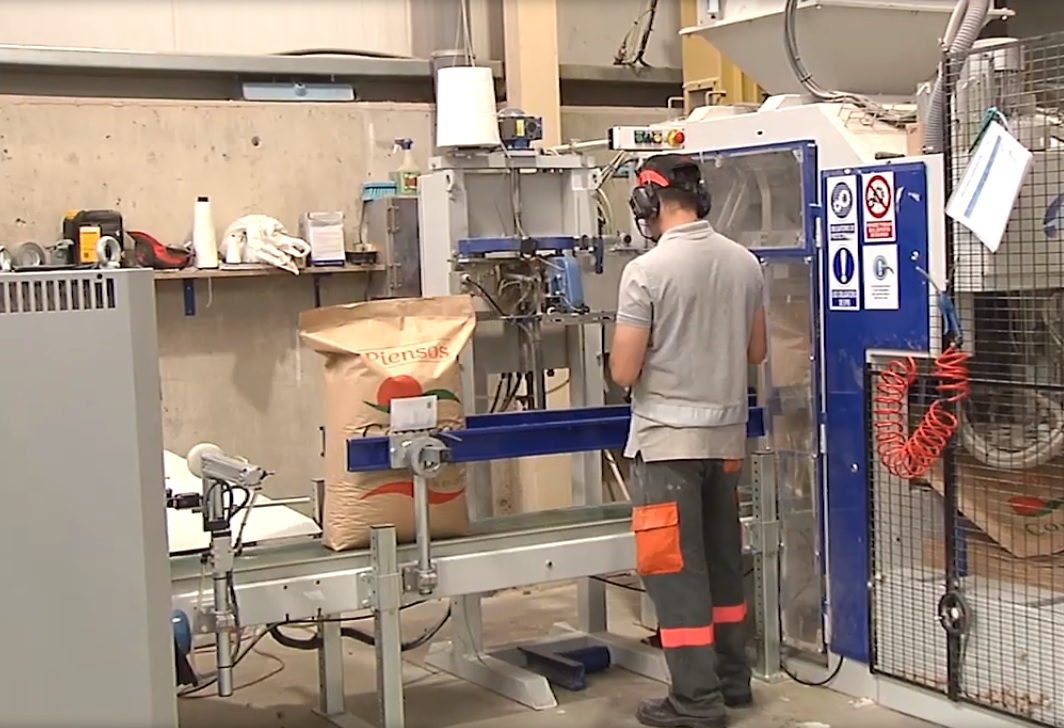
Copiso, a cooperative based in the city dedicated livestock feed.

Soria has a biomass district heating plant called Red de Calor de Soria, which uses woodchip residue fuel from the local timber industry. Venture capital firm AXIS, part of Instituto de Crédito Oficial (ICO), the Spanish promotional bank, has made an equity investment in the project. The project plans to provide 80 GWh of renewable energy per year, which will heat 8,000 homes, saving 28,000 tons of carbon dioxide emissions.

== Transport ==
The city is served by the Soria Railway Station, with daily services to Madrid via Guadalajara. There are also many bus lines to neighbouring cities. A new highway has reduced the trip to Madrid by car down to 2 hours. The city doesn't have its own airport. The nearest airports are Logroño-Agoncillo Airport, located 113 km (70 mi) north, Zaragoza Airport, located 169 km (105 mi) east and Madrid–Barajas Airport, located 219 km (136 mi) southwest of Soria.

== Sport ==
The city's professional football club is called CD Numancia.

Two of Spain's foremost runners of the late 20th century lived and trained in Soria: Fermín Cacho, a gold medallist at the 1992 Barcelona Olympics, and Abel Antón, a two-time World Champion in the marathon. The area in which they trained, Monte Valonsadero, is now host to the annual Cross Internacional de Soria meeting – one of Spain's most prestigious cross country running competitions.

The European Youth Orienteering Championships were held in Soria in July 2010.

== International relations ==
=== Twin towns – sister cities ===
- Collioure, France – since 1994

== Notable people ==
- Saint Saturius of Soria
- Javier Modrego
- Shem Tov ben Abraham ibn Gaon (1283 – c. 1330), a Jewish Talmudist and kabbalist
- David Triay aka El Cromas, Notable Generation Z YouTube influencer

== See also ==
- List of municipalities in Soria
- List of Spanish cities
- Numantia

== Bibliography ==
- Martínez Díez, Gonzalo (2006). "El Fuero de Soria: génesis y fuentes" (PDF). Anuario de Historia del Derecho Español (76). Madrid: Boletín Oficial del Estado: 9–32. ISSN 0304-4319 – via Dialnet.
