= Monastery of San Juan de Duero =

- Monasterio de San Juan de Duero (Spanish)
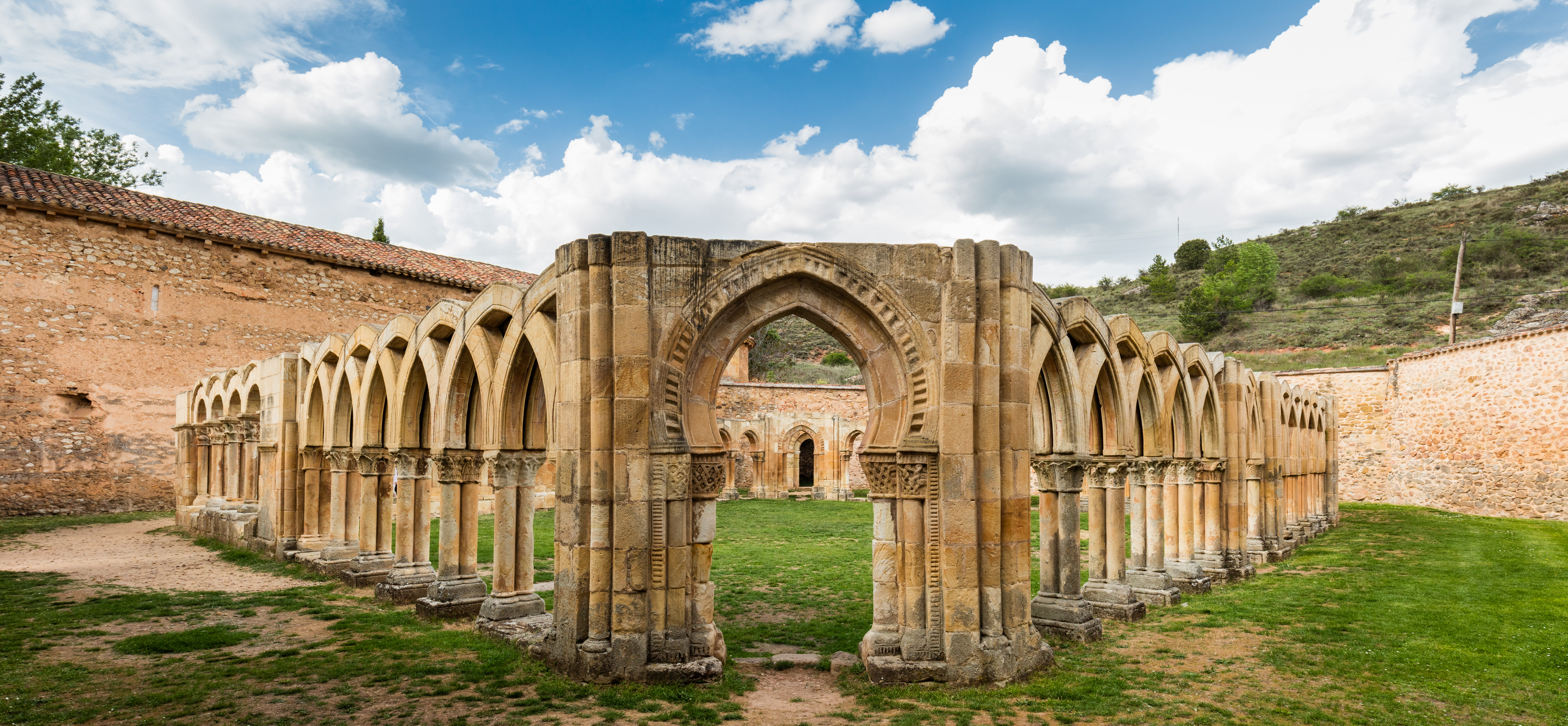

- Location within Spain
- 41.768324°N 2.454421°W
- Location: Soria, Spain

Spanish Cultural Heritage
- Official name: Monasterio de San Juan de Duero
- Type: Non-movable
- Criteria: Monument
- Designated: 1882
- Reference no.: RI-51-0000032

The Monastery of San Juan de Duero (Spanish: Monasterio de San Juan de Duero) is a ruined, medieval monastery located in Soria, Spain. It belonged to the Knights Hospitaller.

The building has been protected since 1882 and is a Bien de Interés Cultural.

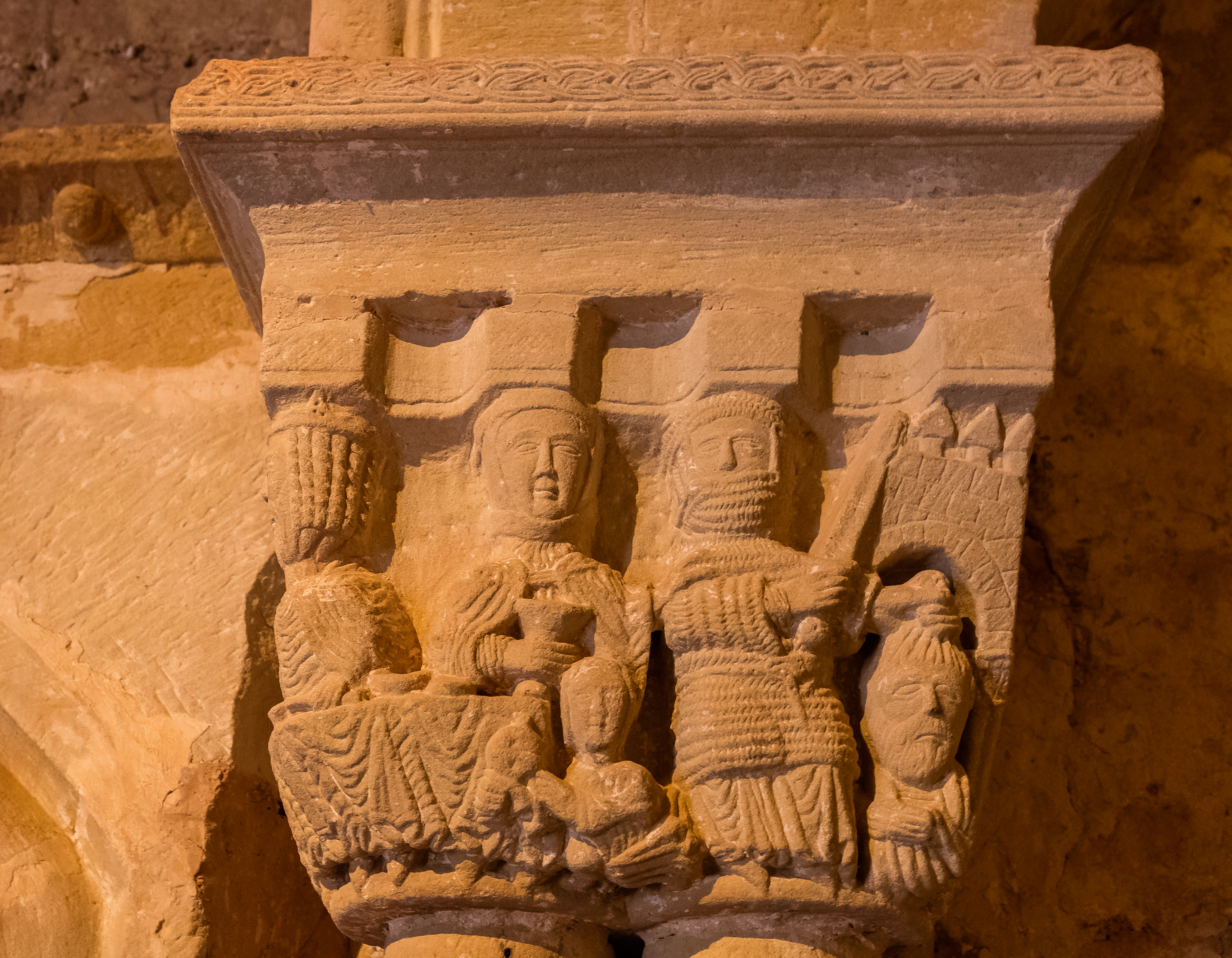
Detail of the church of the monastery
