= Silaus of Lucca =

Irish Bishop

Saint Silaus of Lucca Father of the Poor
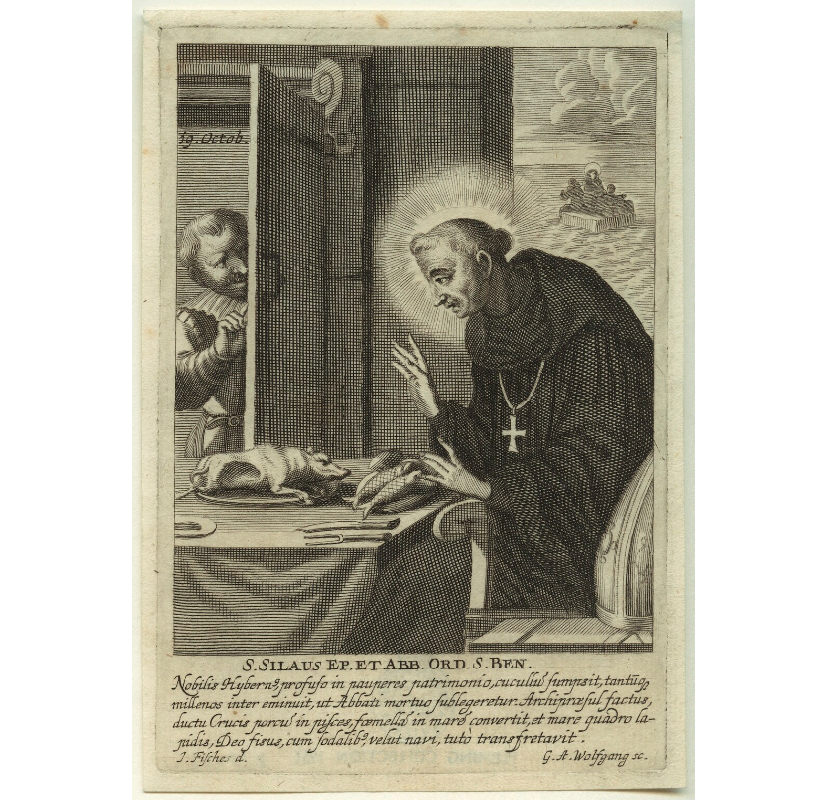
- Silaus of Lucca
- Died: 1100; Lucca, Italy
- Canonized: 1183 by Pope Lucius III
- Feast: 17 May

Saint Silaus of Lucca (or Silave, Silan, Silao; died 1100 AD) was an Irish bishop who died in Lucca, Tuscany, while returning from a pilgrimage. His feast day is 17 May.

== Life ==
The legend is that Silaus was of royal blood and became abbot of Saint Brendan's monastery. He renounced worldly possessions and was elected bishop of a see in Ireland. He travelled to Rome so Pope Gregory VII could consecrate him. His sister Mingarda made a pilgrimage to Rome at the same time. A local nobleman was attracted to her when she passed through Lucca, and on her return from Rome the nobleman imprisoned her until she agreed to marry him. She then retired to Santa Giustina and died. Silao heard what had happened to his sister and went to Lucca where he also died at Santa Giustina. The nuns of that abbey elevated his body in 1180.

== Monks of Ramsgate account ==
The Monks of Ramsgate wrote in their Book of Saints (1921),

Silaus (Silave, Silanus) (St,) Bp. (May 17)
(11th cent.) A holy Irish Bishop who, returning from a pilgrimage to Rome, died at Lucca in Tuscany (A.D. 1100). The many miracles wrought at his tomb led to his being locally venerated as a Saint.

== Butler's account ==
The hagiographer Alban Butler (1710–1773) wrote in his Lives of the Fathers, Martyrs, and Other Principal Saints under May 17,

St. Silave, or Silan, B. C.

HE was an Irish monk, and abbot of St. Brendan's monastery. Being afterwards ordained bishop he governed his diocess with great zeal and charity. The latter part of his life he spent in Italy, where he was styled the Father of the Poor. He died at Lucca in 1100, and was canonized by Pope Lucius III. in 1183. See Colgan, in MSS. ad 17 Maij.

== Sources ==
- Butler, Alban (1823), The Lives of the Irish Saints, Extracted from the Writings of the Rev. Alban Butler, and Now Placed in Order, with a Prefixed Callender; to which is Added, an Office and Litany in Their Honour, with a Defence of the Monastic Institute. By a Cistercian Monk, J. Coyne This article incorporates text from this source, which is in the public domain.
- Houx, Cornell du (2019), "Hagiography and the exotic", Hagiography and the History of Latin Christendom, 500–1500, BRILL, ISBN 9789004417472
- St. Augustine's Abbey, Ramsgate (1921). The Book of saints : a dictionary of servants of God canonized by the Catholic Church. London: A. & C. Black, ltd. OCLC 671676136. This article incorporates text from this source, which is in the public domain.
