= Saturius of Soria =

Saint Saturius of Soria
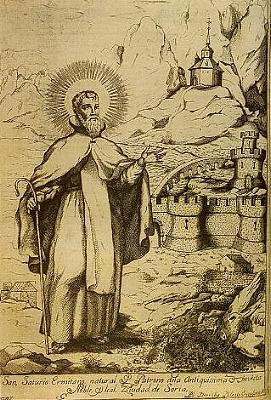
- Born: 493
- Died: 568
- Venerated in: Catholic Church, Eastern Orthodox Church
- Canonized: officially inscribed in the canon of saints in 1753.
- Feast: October 2
- Patronage: Soria

Saint Saturius of Soria (Spanish: San Saturio) (493–568) is a hermit-saint of Spain. Born in Soria, Saturius, according to Christian tradition, dedicated himself to a life of solitude and prayer. He took care of his parents until their death, after which Saturius gave away his inheritance to the poor and at the age of forty, retired to a cave on the hill of Santa Ana (or Peñalba). He lived for the rest of his days in complete austerity and dedicated himself to mortifications of the flesh.

His fame spread and Prudentius of Armentia sought his advice and wisdom. Prudentius became Saturius' companion during the last seven years of the hermit's life and later buried him. Prudentius would subsequently become bishop of Tarazona.

== Veneration ==
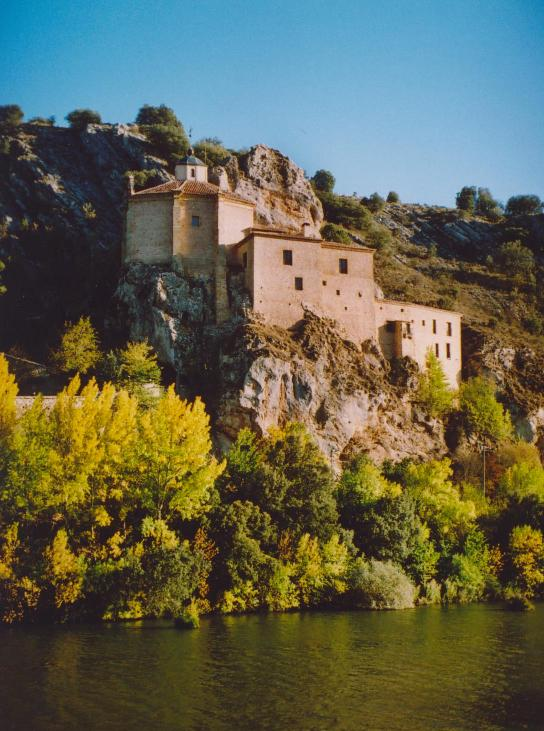
Hermitage of San Saturio near Soria.

He was officially declared patron saint of Soria in 1628, and was inscribed in the canon of saints by the Catholic Church in 1743. Saturius' cave is still an object of pilgrimage. Saturius' hermitage is mentioned by Gustavo Adolfo Bécquer in this writer's El Rayo de Luna.
