= White Terror (Spain) =

Assassinations and mass murders during the Spanish Civil War

Francoist Repression
- Part of the Spanish Civil War, World War II, and the Cold War
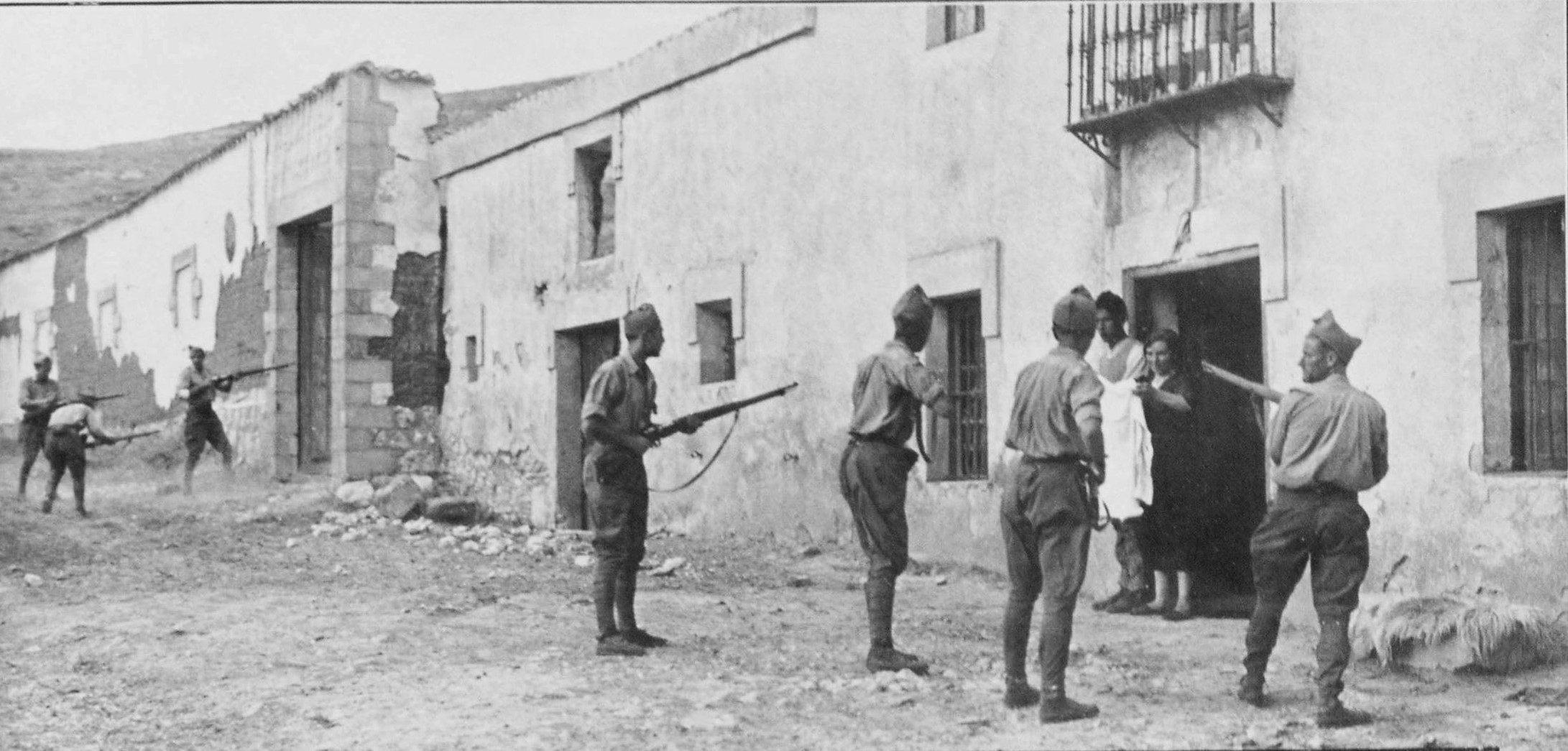
- Francoists in captured Irún, December 1936
- Location: Spain
- Date: 1936–1947
- Target: Spanish Republicans (Socialists, communists, anarchists, liberals, and other leftists), Jews, Freemasons, homosexuals, intellectuals, Basque, Catalan, Andalusian and Galician nationalists, and atheists
- Attack type: Politicide, mass murder, forced labour, human experimentation, war rape, genocide
- Deaths: 160,000–400,000
- Perpetrator: Nationalist faction of Spain and the proceeding government

The White Terror (Spanish: Terror Blanco), also called the Francoist Repression (Spanish: Represión franquista), was the political repression and mass violence against dissidents that were committed by the Nationalist faction during the Spanish Civil War (1936–1939), as well as during the first nine years of the regime of General Francisco Franco. From 1936–1945, Francoist Spain officially designated supporters of the Second Spanish Republic (1931–1939), liberals, socialists of different stripes, anarchists, intellectuals, homosexuals, Freemasons, and Jews as well as Basque, Catalan, Andalusian, and Galician nationalists as enemies.

The Francoist Repression was motivated by the right-wing notion of social cleansing (Spanish: limpieza social), which meant that the Nationalists immediately started executing people viewed as enemies of the state upon capturing territory. The Spanish Catholic Church alleged the killings were a response to the similar mass killings of their clergy, religious, and laity during the Republican Red Terror. They presented the killings by the Civil Guard (national police) and the Falange as a defense of Christendom.

Repression was ideologically hardwired into the Francoist regime, and according to Ramón Arnabat, it turned "the whole country into one wide prison". The regime accused the loyalist supporters of the Republic of having "adherence to the rebellion", providing "aid to the rebellion", or "military rebellion"; using the Republicans' own ideological tactics against them. Franco's Law of Political Responsibilities (Spanish: Ley de Responsabilidades Políticas), in force until 1962, gave legalistic color of law to the political repression that characterized the defeat and dismantling of the Second Spanish Republic and punished Loyalist Spaniards.

The historian Stanley G. Payne considers the White Terror's death toll to be greater than the death toll of the corresponding Red Terror.

== Background ==
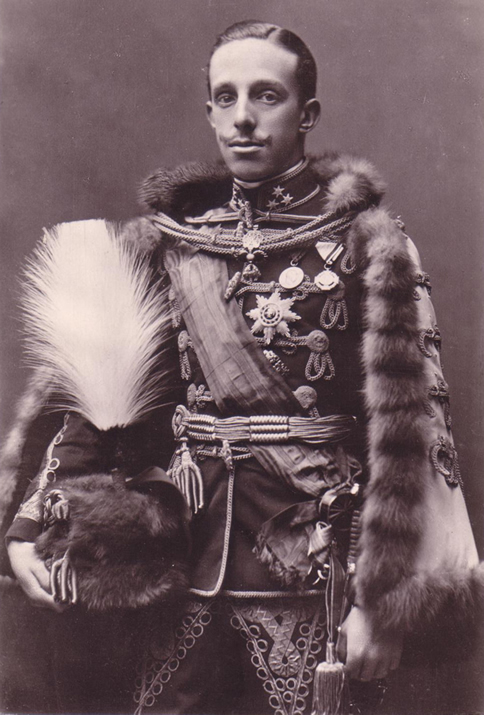
The end of the monarchy of King Alfonso XIII (r. 1886–1931) precipitated Gen. Francisco Franco's reactionary coup d'état (17 July 1936) against the Second Spanish Republic (1931–1939), which launched the Spanish Civil War (1936–1939)

After a trio of crises in 1917, the spiral of violence in Morocco and the lead-up to the installment of the dictatorship of Miguel Primo de Rivera through a 1923 military coup d'état won the acquiescence of Alfonso XIII. Upon the political failure of the dictatorship, Alfonso XIII removed support from Primo de Rivera (who was thereby forced to resign in 1930) and favoured a return to the pre-1923 state of affairs during the so-called dictablanda. Nevertheless, he had lost most of his political capital along the way. Alfonso XIII voluntarily left Spain after the municipal elections of April 1931 – understood as a plebiscite for maintaining the monarchy or declaring a republic – which led to the proclamation of the Second Spanish Republic on 14 April 1931. The Second Spanish Republic was led by President Niceto Alcalá-Zamora, whose government instituted a program of secular reforms, which included agrarian reform, the separation of church and state, the right to divorce, women's suffrage (November 1933), the socio-political reformation of the Spanish Army, and political autonomy for Catalonia and the Basque Country (October 1936). President Alcalá-Zamora's reforms to Spanish society were continually blocked by the right-wing parties and rejected by the far-left Confederación Nacional del Trabajo (CNT). The Second Spanish Republic suffered attacks from the right wing (the failed coup d'état of Sanjurjo in 1932), and the left wing (the Asturian miners' strike of 1934), whilst enduring the economic impact of the Great Depression.

After the Popular Front – a coalition of leftist parties (Spanish Socialist Workers' Party (PSOE), Republican Left (IR), Republican Union (UR), Communist Party (PCE), Workers' Party of Marxist Unification (POUM), Republican Left of Catalonia (ERC) and others) – won the general election of February 1936, the Spanish right-wing planned to overthrow the democratic Republic in a coup d'état to reinstall the monarchy. Finally, on 17 July 1936, a part of the Spanish Army, led by a group of far-right-wing officers (the generals José Sanjurjo, Manuel Goded Llopis, Emilio Mola, Francisco Franco, Miguel Cabanellas, Gonzalo Queipo de Llano, José Enrique Varela, and others) launched a military coup d'état against the Spanish Republic in July 1936. The generals' coup d'état failed, but the rebellious army, known as the Nationalists, controlled a large part of Spain; this was the start of the Spanish Civil War.

Franco, one of the coup's leaders, and his Nationalist army won the Spanish Civil War in 1939. Franco ruled Spain for the next 36 years until his death in 1975. Besides the mass assassinations of Republican political enemies, political prisoners were imprisoned in concentration camps and homosexuals were confined in psychiatric hospitals.

=== Repressive thinking ===
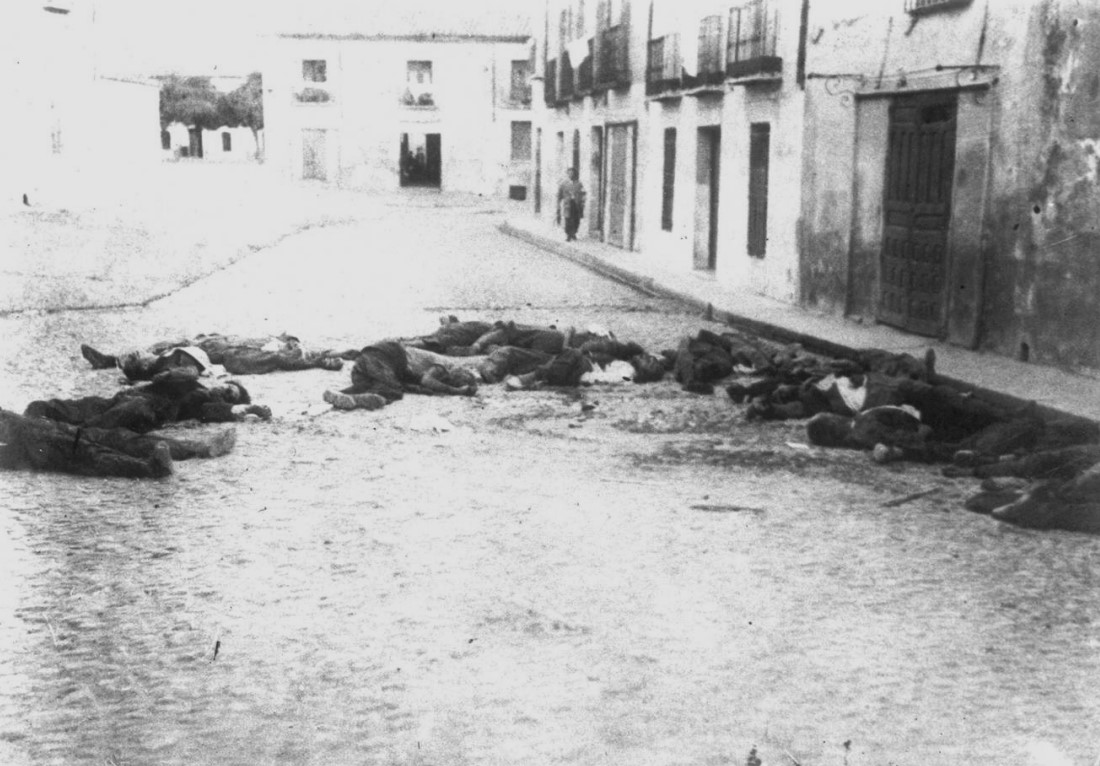
Galician reapers shot by the Nationalists in Talavera de la Reina in 1936; the execution was attributed to the Republicans by the Francoist propaganda which distributed the photo as evidence of atrocities by the "Marxist hordes"

The Chief Prosecutor of the Francoist army, Felipe Acedo Colunga, wrote in the internal report of 1939:

The native land must be disinfected beforehand. And here is the work – weight and glory – entrusted by chance of destiny to military justice.

According to the historian Francisco Espinosa, Felipe Acedo proposed an exemplary model of repression to create the new fascist state "on the site of the race." Absolute purification was needed, "stripped of all feelings of personal piety." According to Espinosa, the legal model for repression was the German (National Socialist) procedural system, where the prosecutor could act outside legal considerations. What was important was the unwritten right that, according to Hermann Göring, people carry as a 'sacred ember in their blood'.

According to Franco, the issue of Catalonia was one of the main reasons for the war. General Gonzalo Queipo de Llano wrote in an article subtitled "Against Catalonia, the Israel of the modern world", published in Diario Palentino on November 26, 1936, that Franco's regime considered Catalan people to be "a race of Jews, because they use the same procedures that the Hebrews perform in all the nations of the globe." Queipo de Llano declared, "When the war is over, Pompeu Fabra and his works will be dragged along the Ramblas". Fabra standardized the Catalan language, and his house was raided; his large personal library was burned in the middle of the street, but Fabra was able to escape and went into exile.

=== Policy of extermination of the enemy ===
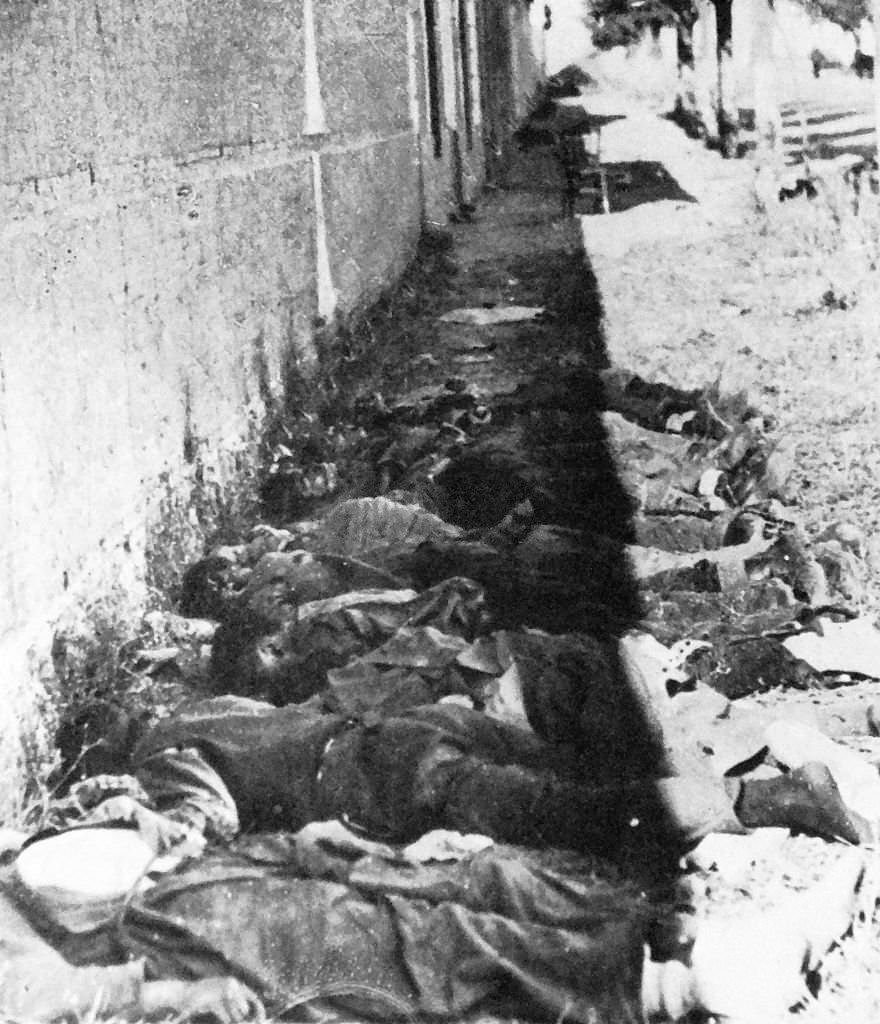
Executed Republicans in Extremadura, 1936

In November 1937, four months after the Collective Letter of the Spanish Bishops was signed and distributed, the Spanish bishops issued a second letter in which they justified the extermination of the enemy and testified that this was an existing policy. Otherwise, the explicit reference to a policy of extermination, not repression or elimination, leads to biopolitical interpretations, as using the war for a eugenic action over the Spanish population.

== Red and White Terrors ==
From the beginning of the war in July 1936, the ideological nature of the Nationalist fight against the Republicans indicated the degree of dehumanisation of the lower social classes (peasants and workers) in the view of the politically reactionary sponsors of the nationalist forces, the Roman Catholic Church of Spain, the aristocracy, the landowners, and the military, commanded by Franco. Captain Gonzalo de Aguilera y Munro, a public affairs officer for the Nationalist forces, told the American reporter John Thompson Whitaker:

You know what's wrong with Spain? Modern plumbing! In healthier times – spiritually healthier, you understand – plague and pestilence could be counted on to thin the Spanish masses ... now, with modern sewage disposal, they simply multiply too fast. The masses are no better than animals, you understand, and you can't expect them not to become infected with the virus of Bolshevism. After all, rats and lice carry the plague.

The Nationalists committed their atrocities in public, sometimes with assistance from members of the local Catholic Church clergy. In August 1936, the Badajoz massacre ended with the shooting of between 500 and 4,000 Republicans; and on August 20, after a Mass and a multitudinous parade, two Republican city mayors (Juan Antonio Rodríguez Machín and Sinforiano Madroñero), Socialist deputy Nicolás de Pablo and 15 other people (7 of them Portuguese) were publicly executed. The assassination of hospitalized and wounded Republican soldiers was also a common practice.

Among the children of the landlords, the joke name Reforma agraria (agrarian reform) identified the horseback hunting parties by which they killed insubordinate peasantry and so cleansed their lands of communists. The joke name alluded to the grave where the corpses of the hunted peasants were dumped: the piece of land for which the dispossessed peasants had revolted. Early in the civil war most of the victims of the White Terror and the Red Terror were killed in mass executions behind the respective front lines of the Nationalist and the Republican forces:

During the first months of the fighting most of the deaths did not come from combat on the battlefield, but from political executions in – the "Red" and "White" terrors. In some cases, the murder of political opponents began more or less spontaneously, but, from the very beginning, there was always a certain degree of organization, and nearly all the killings, after the first few days, were carried out by organized groups.

Common to the political purges of the left-wing and right-wing belligerents were the sacas, the taking of prisoners from jails and prisons, who then were taken for a paseo, a ride to summary execution. Most of the victims were killed by death squads, from the trade unions, and by the paramilitary militias of the political parties (the Republican CNT, UGT, and PCE; the Nationalist Falange and Carlist). Among the justifications for summary execution of right-wing enemies was reprisal for aerial bombings of civilians; other people were killed after being denounced as an enemy of the people, by false accusations motivated by personal envy and hatred. Nevertheless, the significant differences between White political terrorism and Red political terrorism were indicated by Francisco Partaloa, prosecutor of the Supreme Court of Madrid (Tribunal Supremo de Madrid) and a friend of the aristocrat General Queipo de Llano, who witnessed the assassinations, first in the Republican camp and then in the Nationalist camp of the Spanish Civil War:

I had the opportunity of being a witness to the repression in both areas. In the Nationalist side it was planned, methodical, cold. As they did not trust the [local] people, the authorities imposed their will by means of terror, committing atrocities in order to achieve their aim. Atrocities also took place in the Popular Front zone; that was something which both areas had in common. But the main difference was that in the Republican zone the crimes were carried out by the [local] populace in moments of passion, not by the authorities. The latter always tried to stop them. The assistance that I received from the Spanish Republican authorities in order to flee to safety, is only one of the many examples. But this was not the case in the Nationalist zone.

Historians of the Spanish Civil War, such as Helen Graham, Paul Preston, Antony Beevor, Gabriel Jackson, Hugh Thomas, and Ian Gibson concurred that the mass killings committed behind the Nationalist frontlines were organized and approved by the Nationalist rebel authorities, while the killings behind the Republican front lines resulted from the societal breakdown of the Second Spanish Republic:

Though there was much wanton killing in rebel Spain, the idea of the limpieza, the "cleaning up" of the country from the evils which had overtaken it, was a disciplined policy of the new authorities, and a part of their programme of regeneration. In republican Spain, most of the killing was the consequence of anarchy, the outcome of a national breakdown, and not the work of the state; even though some political parties in some cities abetted the enormities, and even though some of those responsible ultimately rose to positions of authority.

In the second volume of A History of Spain and Portugal (1973), Stanley G. Payne said that the political violence in the Republican zone was organized by the left-wing political parties:

In general, this was not an irrepressible outpouring of hatred, by the man in the street for his "oppressors", as it has sometimes been painted, but a semi-organized activity carried out by sections of nearly all the leftist groups. In the entire leftist zone the only organized political party that eschewed involvement in such activity were the Basque Nationalists.

That, unlike the political repression by the right wing, which "was concentrated against the most dangerous opposition elements", the Republican attacks were irrational, which featured the "murdering [of] innocent people, and letting some of the more dangerous go free. Moreover, one of the main targets of the Red Terror was the clergy, most of whom were not engaged in overt opposition" to the Spanish Republic. Julius Ruiz argues the same: "The terror in Madrid was not extraneous to the antifascist war effort following the defeat of the military rebellion in July 1936; on the contrary, it was integral to it. Securing the rearguard required an organised response." Nonetheless, in a letter-to-the-editor of the ABC newspaper in Seville, Miguel de Unamuno said that, unlike the assassinations in the areas held by the Republic, the methodical assassinations effected by the White Terror were ordered by the highest authorities of the Nationalist rebellion, and identified General Mola as the proponent of the political cleansing policies of the White Terror.

No matter how many the atrocities perpetrated by the Reds ... those perpetrated by the Whites are greater ... Murders without justification, such as two University lecturers, one in Valladolid, and another in Granada, just in case they were Masonic, and García Lorca as well. It is disgusting to be a Spaniard stuck in Spain now. And all this is being directed by General Mola, that poisonous beast full of resentment. I told that Spain would be saved by Western Christian civilization, but the methods employed are not civilized, but militarized, not Western, but African, not Christian, but from an ancient Spanish traditionalism that is essentially anti-Christian.

When news of the mass killings of Republican soldiers and sympathizers – General Mola's policy to terrorise the Republicans – reached the Republican government, the Defence Minister Indalecio Prieto pleaded with the Spanish republicans:

Don't imitate them! Don't imitate them! Surpass them in your moral conduct; surpass them by your generosity. I do not ask you, however, that you should lose vigour in battle or zeal in the fight. I ask for hard breasts for the combat, hard like steel, as some of the courageous militias have named themselves – Breast of Steel – but with sensitive hearts, capable of shaking in the face of human sorrow, and capable of harbouring mercy, the tender sentiment without which the most essential part of human greatness is lost.

Moreover, despite his political loyalty to the reactionary rebellion of the Nationalists, the right-wing writer José María Pemán was concerned about the volume of the mass killings; in My Lunches with Important People (1970), he reported a conversation with General Miguel Cabanellas in late 1936:

My General, I think that far too many people have been, and are still being killed, by the Nationalist side.

After a full minute of silent reflection, General Cabanellas grimly answered:

—Yes.

== Civil War ==
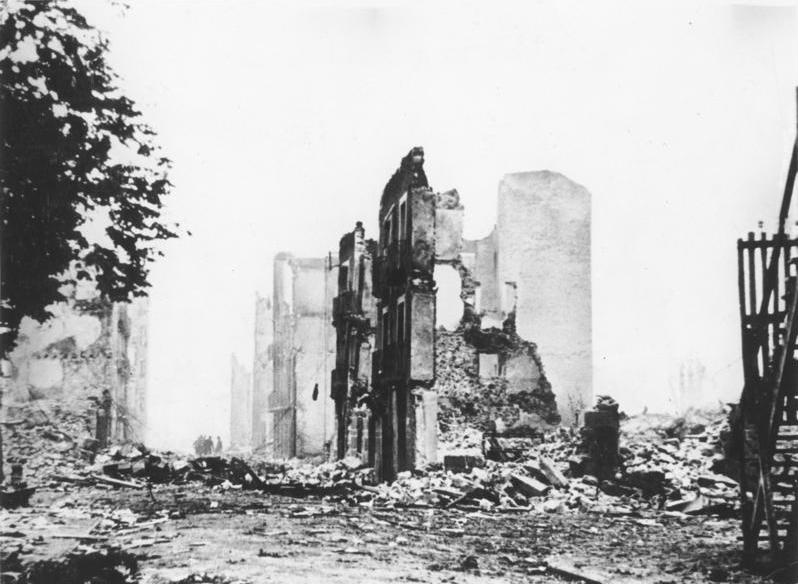
The ruins of Guernica, destroyed by the Condor Legion of the German Luftwaffe

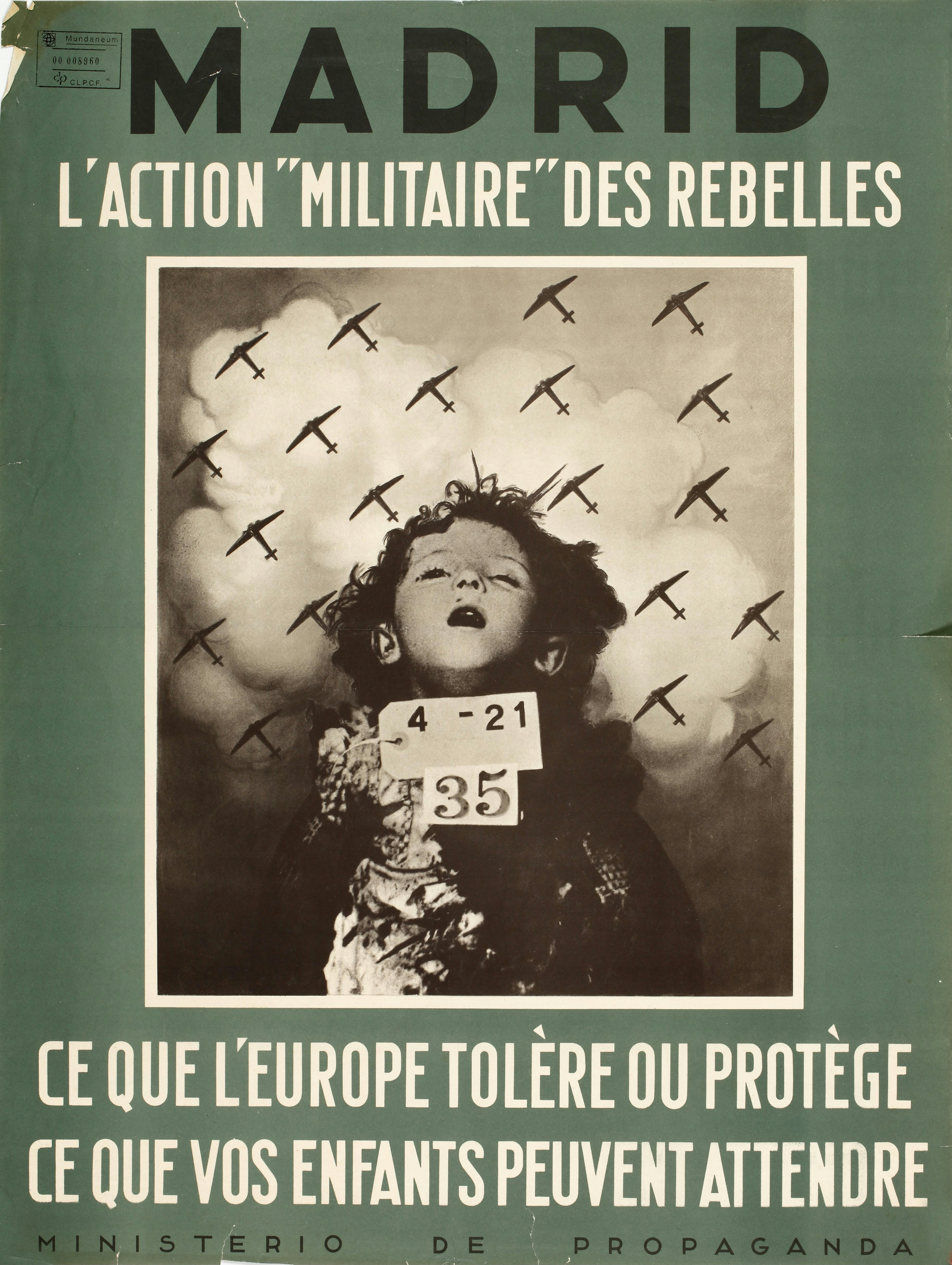
A republican poster with a child killed in a bombing of Madrid

The White Terror commenced on 17 July 1936, the day of the Nationalist coup d'état, with hundreds of executions committed in the area controlled by the right-wing rebels, but it had been planned before earlier. In the 30 June 1936 secret instructions for the coup d'état in Morocco, Mola ordered the rebels "to eliminate left-wing elements, communists, anarchists, union members, etc." The White Terror included the repression of political opponents in areas occupied by the Nationalist, mass executions in areas captured from the Republicans, such as the Massacre of Badajoz, and looting.

In The Spanish Labyrinth (1943), Gerald Brenan said that:

... thanks to the failure of the coup d'état and to the eruption of the Falangist and Carlist militias, with their previously prepared lists of victims, the scale on which these executions took place exceeded all precedent. Andalusia, where the supporters of Franco were a tiny minority, and where the military commander, General Queipo de Llano, was a pathological figure recalling the Conde de España of the First Carlist War, was drenched in blood. The famous massacre of Badajoz was merely the culminating act of a ritual that had already been performed in every town and village in the South-West of Spain.

Other examples include the bombing of civilian areas in Guernica, Madrid, Málaga, Almería, Lérida, Alicante, Durango, Granollers, Alcañiz, Valencia and Barcelona by the Luftwaffe (Legion Condor) and the Italian air force (Aviazione Legionaria) (according to Gabriel Jackson estimates range from 5,000 to 10,000 victims of the bombings), killings of Republican POWs, rape, forced disappearances – including whole Republican military units such as the 221st Mixed Brigade – and the establishment of Francoist prisons in the aftermath of the Republicans' defeat.

=== Goals and victims of the repression ===
The main goal of the White Terror was to terrify the civil population who opposed the coup, eliminate the supporters of the Republic and the militants of the leftist parties, portraying them as not merely a political group, but as a religious group of atheists. Because of this, some historians have considered the White Terror a genocide. In fact, one of the leaders of the coup, General Mola, said:

It is necessary to spread terror. We have to create the impression of mastery eliminating without scruples or hesitation all those who do not think as we do. There can be no cowardice. If we hesitate one moment and fail to proceed with the greatest determination, we will not win. Anyone who helps or hides a Communist or a supporter of the Popular Front will be shot.

Sánchez Léon says that the thanatopolitics and the biopolitics of the Francoist repression simultaneously obeyed to the logics of a civil war, a colonial conquest and a Catholic holy war, but was unleashed upon a population hitherto considered part of the same community. Features such as the institutional processes, policies and practices put in motion by the victors, the indiscriminate massacres, the re-catholisation of the defeated, the forced exile and the exclusion from the benefits of full citizenship or the application of retroactive repressive rulings crystallised in the definition of the Republicans as anti-Spanish, a terminology that intermingles the perception of the enemies as "non-citizens", as "inferior beings" and as alien to the values that defined the self-imagined (confessional) nation. Behind the generic term 'Reds' there was a notion of enemy in an absolute sense, targeted for eradication.

In areas controlled by the Nationalists, targeted were:

- government officials and Popular Front politicians (in the city of Granada 23 of the 44 councillors of the city's corporation were executed), and people suspected of voting for the Popular Front
- union leaders
- teachers, hundreds of whom were killed by the Nationalists in the first weeks of the war
- intellectuals - for example, in Granada, between 26 July 1936 and 1 March 1939, the poet Federico García Lorca, the editor of the left-wing newspaper El Defensor de Granada, the professor of paediatrics at Granada University, the rector of the university, the professor of political law, the professor of pharmacy, the professor of history, the engineer of the road to the top of the Sierra Morena and the best-known doctor in the city were killed by the Nationalists, and in the city of Cordoba, "nearly the entire republican elite, from deputies to booksellers, were executed in August, September and December...",
- suspected Freemasons, such as in Huesca, where there were only twelve Freemasons, the Nationalists killed a hundred suspected Freemasons,
- Basque, Catalan, Andalusian or Galician nationalists, among them Manuel Carrasco i Formiguera, leader of Democratic Union of Catalonia Unió Democrática de Catalunya, Alexandre Bóveda, one of the founders of the Partido Galeguista and Blas Infante.
- military officers who had remained loyal to the government of the Republic, among them the Army generals Domingo Batet, Enrique Salcedo Molinuevo, Miguel Campíns, Nicolás Molero, Nuñez de Prado, Manuel Romerales and Rogelio Caridad Pita.

Victims were usually brought before local committees and imprisoned or executed. The living conditions in the improvised Nationalist prisons were very harsh. One former Republican prisoner stated:

At times we were forty prisoners in a cell built to accommodate two people. There were two benches, each capable of seating three persons, and the floor to sleep on. For our private needs, there were only three chamberpots. They had to be emptied into an old rusty cauldron which also served for washing our clothes. We were forbidden to have food brought to us from outside, and were given disgusting soup cooked with soda ash which kept us in a constant state of dysentery. We were all in a deplorable state. The air was unbreathable and the babies choked many nights for lack of oxygen... To be imprisoned, according to the rebels, was to lose all individuality. The most elementary human rights were unknown and people were killed as easily as rabbits...

Because of the mass terror in many areas controlled by the Nationalists, thousands of Republicans left their homes and tried to hide in nearby forests or mountains – these Republicans became known as huidos. Many of them later joined the Spanish maquis, the anti-Francoist guerrilla force that continued to fight against the Francoist State in the post-war era. Hundreds of thousands of others fled to the areas controlled by the Second Republic. In 1938, there were more than one million refugees in Barcelona alone. In many cases, when someone fled the Nationalists executed their relatives. One witness in Zamora stated: "All the members of the Flechas family, both men and women, were killed, a total of seven persons. A son succeeded in escaping, but in his place, they killed his eight-months-pregnant fiancé Transito Alonso and her mother, Juana Ramos." Furthermore, thousands of Republicans joined the Falange and the Nationalist army in order to escape the repression. In fact, many supporters of the Nationalists referred to the Falange as "our reds" and to the Falange's blue shirt as the salvavidas (life jacket). In Granada, one supporter of the Nationalists said:

The battalion was formed to give political prisoners, who would otherwise have been shot, a chance either to redeem themselves on the field or else die with honour before enemy fire. In this way their children would not suffer the stigma of having had Red fathers.

Another major target of the Terror was women, with the overall goal of keeping them in their traditional place in Spanish society. To this end, the Nationalist army promoted a campaign of targeted rape. Queipo de Llano spoke multiple times over the radio warning that "immodest" women with Republican sympathies would be raped by his Moorish troops. Near Seville, Nationalist soldiers raped a truckload of female prisoners, threw their bodies down a well, and paraded around town with their rifles draped with their victims' underwear. These rapes were not the result of soldiers disobeying orders, but official Nationalist policies, with officers specifically choosing Moors to be the primary perpetrators. Advancing Nationalist troops scrawled "Your children will give birth to fascists" on the walls of captured buildings, and many women taken prisoner were force fed castor oil, a powerful laxative, and then paraded in public naked.

=== Death toll ===
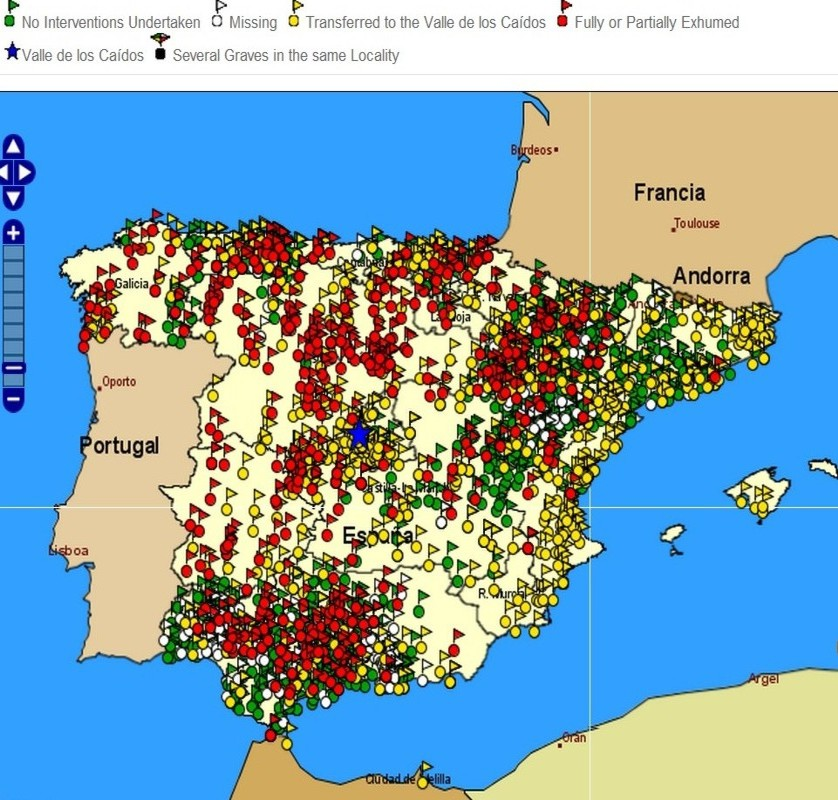
Spanish Civil War grave sites. Location of known burial places. Colors refer to the type of intervention that has been carried out. Green: No Interventions Undertaken so far. White: Missing grave. Yellow: Transferred to the Valle de los Caídos. Red: Fully or Partially Exhumed. Blue star: Valle de los Caídos. Source: Ministry of Justice of Spain

Estimates of executions behind the Nationalist lines during the Spanish Civil War range from fewer than 50,000 to 200,000 (Hugh Thomas: 75,000, Secundino Serrano: 90,000; Josep Fontana: 150,000;Julián Casanova: 100,000 and Julius Ruiz: 150,000.) Most of the victims were killed without a trial in the first months of the war, and their corpses were left on the sides of roads or in clandestine and unmarked mass graves. For example, in Valladolid only 374 officially recorded victims of the repression of a total of 1,303 (there were many other unrecorded victims) were executed after a trial, and the historian Stanley Payne in his work Fascism in Spain (1999), citing a study by Cifuentes Checa and Maluenda Pons carried out over the Nationalist-controlled city of Zaragoza and its environs, refers to 3,117 killings, of which 2,578 took place in 1936. He goes on to state that by 1938 the military courts there were directing summary executions.

Many of the executions in the course of the war were carried out by militants of the fascist party Falange (Falange Española de las J.O.N.S.) or militants of the Carlist party (Comunión Tradicionalista) militia (Requetés), but with the approval of the Nationalist government.

=== Cooperation of the Spanish Church ===
The Spanish Church approved of the White Terror and cooperated with the rebels. According to Antony Beevor:

Cardinal Gomá stated that 'Jews and Masons poisoned the national soul with absurd doctrine'... A few brave priests put their lives at risk by criticizing Nationalist atrocities, but the majority of the clergy in Nationalist areas revelled in their new-found power and the increased size of their congregations. Anyone who did not attend Mass faithfully was likely to be suspected of 'red' tendencies. Entrepreneurs made a great money selling religious symbols... It was reminiscent of the way the Inquisition's persecutions of Jews and Moors helped make pork such an important part of the Spanish diet.

One witness in Zamora said:

Many priests acted very badly. The bishop of Zamora in 1936 was more or less an assassin – I don't remember his name. He must be held responsible because prisoners appealed to him to save their lives. All he would reply was that the Reds had killed more people than the Falangists were killing.

(The bishop of Zamora in 1936 was Manuel Arce y Ochotorena) Nevertheless, the Nationalists killed at least 16 Basque nationalist priests (among them the arch-priest of Mondragon), and imprisoned or deported hundreds more. Several priests who tried to halt the killings and at least one priest who was a Mason were killed.

Regarding the callous attitude of the Vatican, Manuel Montero, lecturer of the University of the Basque Country commented on 6 May 2007:

The Church, which upheld the idea of a 'National Crusade' in order to legitimize the military rebellion, was a belligerent part during the Civil War, even at the cost of alienating part of its members. It continues in a belligerent role in its unusual answer to the Historical Memory Law by recurring to the beatification of 498 "martyrs" of the Civil War. The priests executed by Franco's Army are not counted among them. It continues to be a Church that is incapable of transcending its one-sided behaviour of 70 years ago and amenable to the fact that this past should always haunt us. In this political use of granting religious recognition one can perceive its indignation regarding the compensations to the victims of Francoism. Its selective criteria regarding the religious persons that were part of its ranks are difficult to fathom. The priests who were victims of the Republicans are "martyrs who died forgiving", but those priests who were executed by the Francoists are forgotten.

=== Repression in the South and the drive to Madrid ===
The White Terror was especially harsh in the southern part of Spain (Andalusia and Extremadura). The rebels bombed and seized the working-class districts of the main Andalusian cities in the first days of the war, and afterwards went on to execute thousands of workers and militants of the leftist parties: in the city of Cordoba 4,000; in the city of Granada 5,000; in the city of Seville 3,028; and in the city of Huelva 2,000 killed and 2,500 disappeared. The city of Málaga, occupied by the Nationalists in February 1937 following the Battle of Málaga, experienced one of the harshest repressions following Francoist victory with an estimated total of 17,000 people summarily executed. Carlos Arias Navarro, then a young lawyer who as public prosecutor signed thousands of execution warrants in the trials set up by the triumphant rightists, became known as "The Butcher of Málaga" (Carnicero de Málaga). Over 4,000 people were buried in mass graves.

Even rural towns were not spared, such as Lora del Rio in the province of Seville, where the Nationalists killed 300 peasants as a reprisal for the assassination of a local landowner. In the province of Córdoba the Nationalists killed 995 Republicans in Puente Genil and about 700 loyalists were murdered by the orders of Nationalist Colonel Sáenz de Buruaga in Baena, although other estimates mention up to 2,000 victims following the Baena Massacre.

Paul Preston estimates the total number of victims of the Nationalists in Andalusia at 55,000.

==== Troops of North Africa ====
The colonial troops of the Spanish Army of Africa (Ejército de África), composed mainly of the Moroccan regulares and the Spanish Legion, under the command of Colonel Juan Yagüe, made up the feared shock troops of the Francoist military. In their advance towards Madrid from Sevilla through Andalusia and Extremadura these troops routinely killed dozens or hundreds in every town or city conquered. but in the Massacre of Badajoz the number of Republicans killed reached several thousands. Furthermore, the colonial troops raped many working-class women and looted the houses of the Republicans.

== Anti-Catalan hostility ==
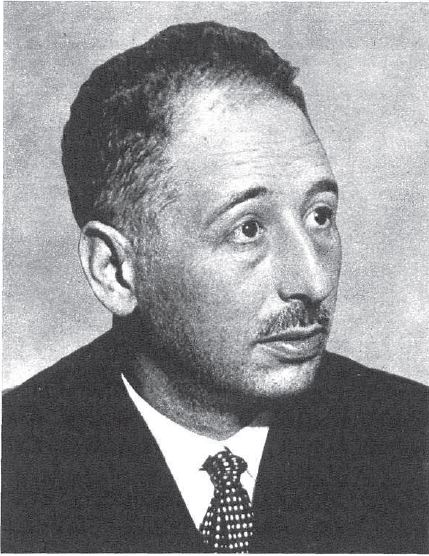
Lluís Companys, 123rd/second president of the restored Generalitat de Catalunya, was captured by the Gestapo and executed by the Francoists.

In Tarragona, in January 1939, Mass was held by a canon from Salamanca cathedral, José Artero. During the sermon he cried: "Catalan dogs! You are not worthy of the sun that shines on you." (¡Perros catalanes! No sois dignos del sol que os alumbra.) Regarding the men who entered and marched through Barcelona, Franco said the honour was not "because they had fought better, but because they were those who felt more hatred. That is, more hatred towards Catalonia and Catalans." (porque hubieran luchado mejor, sino porque eran los que sentían más odio. Es decir, más odio hacia Cataluña y los catalanes.)

A close friend of Franco, Victor Ruiz Albéniz, published an article in which he demanded that Catalonia receive "a Biblical punishment (Sodom and Gomarrah) to purify the red city, the headquarters of anarchism and separatism as the only remedy to remove these two cancers by relentless cauterisation" ("un castigo bíblico (Sodoma y Gomorra) para purificar la ciudad roja, la sede del anarquismo y separatismo como único remedio para extirpar esos dos cánceres por termocauterio implacable"), while for Serrano Suñer, brother-in-law of Franco and Minister of the Interior, Catalan nationalism was "an illness" ("una enfermedad.")

The man appointed as civil governor of Barcelona, Wenceslao González Oliveros, said that "Spain was raised, with as much or more force against the dismembered statutes as against Communism and that any tolerance of regionalism would again lead to the same processes of putrefaction that we have just surgically removed." ("España se alzó, con tanta o más fuerza contra los Estatutos desmembrados que contra el comunismo y que cualquier tolerancia del regionalismo llevaría otra vez a los mismos procesos de putrefacción que acabamos de extirpar quirúrgicamente.")

Even Catalan conservatives, such as Francesc Cambó, were themselves frightened by Franco's hatred and spirit of revenge. Cambó wrote of Franco in his diary: "As if he did not feel or understand the miserable, desperate situation in which Spain finds itself and only thinks about his victory, he feels the need to travel the whole country (...) like a bullfighter to gather applause, cigars, hats and some scarce jacket." ("Como si no sintiera ni comprendiera la situación miserable, desesperada, en que se encuentra España y no pensara más que en su victoria, siente la necesidad de recorrer todo el país (...) como un torero para recoger aplausos, cigarros, sombreros y alguna americana escasa.")

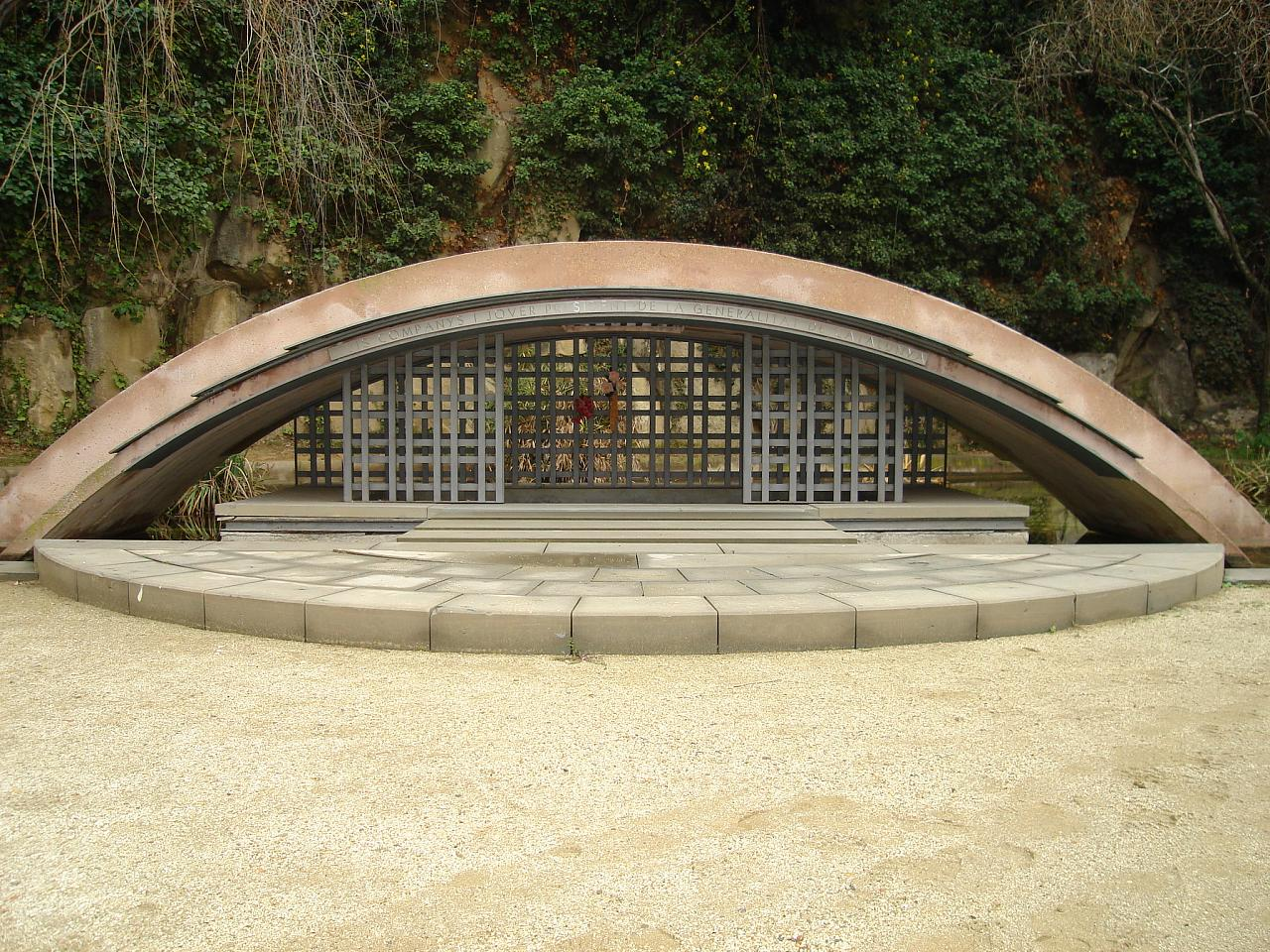
Tomb of Lluís Companys at Fossar de la Pedrera.

The 2nd president of the Generalitat de Catalunya, Lluís Companys, went into exile in France, like many others, in January 1939. The Spanish authorities asked for him to be extradited to Germany. The questions remains whether he was detained by the Gestapo or the German military police, known as the Wehrmacht. In any case, he was detained on August 13, 1940, and immediately deported to Franco's Spain.

After a summary court martial without due process, he was executed on October 15, 1940, at Montjuïc Castle. Since then there have been many calls to cancel that judgement, without success.

=== Francoist repression ===
After the repression, the Franco regime created networks of complicity in which thousands of people were involved or were accomplices, in all possible ways, of the bloodshed inflicted, of the persecutions carried out, of the lives of hundreds of thousands people in prisons, concentration camps or Battalions workers. In short, the most diverse forms of repression: political, social, labor, ideological, and in the case of Catalonia, in an attempt of cultural genocide that sought to do away with its specific national personality...

— Josep Maria Solé i Sabaté i Joan Vilarroya i Font

There was a confluence between Spanish regenerationism and the degenerationist theories originated in France and Great Britain. As a consequence is theorized a racial degeneration causing conflicts against the social status quo, and it is advocated eugenics to cleanse one's own race, and racism to avoid mixing it with "inferior races." During the first third of the 1900s, the ideal of the "new man" was growing in power, and its zenith was in Nazi racial politics. The Spanish political and social elites, who could not tolerate the loss of Spain's colonies, saw the Second Spanish Republic and Catalan autonomy as a threat to their status, power, and wealth, which caused them to subscribe to the ideal of the new man. The Spanish elites also could not tolerate Catalonia's industrial wealth, and accused Catalonia of being given preferable treatment, impoverishing the rest of Spain via behavior that was described as Semitic (the idea of using work as a means to exploit and subjugate nations in Nazi ideology).

According to Paul Preston in the book "Arquitectes del terror. Franco i els artifex de l'odi", a number of characters theorized about "anti-Spain", pointing to enemies, and in this sense accused politicians and republican intellectuals of being of Jewish race or servants of the same as masons. This accusation is widespread in Catalonia for most politicians and intellectuals, starting with Macià, Companys and Cambó, identified as Jews. "Racisme i supremacisme polítics a l'Espanya contemporània" documents this thought of the social part that would be raised against the Republic. In a mixture of degenerationism, regenerationism, and neocolonialism, it is postulated that the Spanish race – always understood as Castilian – has degenerated, and degenerate individuals are prone to "contract" communism and separatism. In addition, some areas, such as the south of the peninsula and the Catalan countries, are considered to be degenerate wholesale, the former due to Arab remains that lead them to a "rifty" behavior, and the latter due to Semitic remains that lead them towards communism and separatism (the catanalism of any kind is called separatism).

The degeneration of individuals calls for a cleansing if it wants a prosperous and leading nation, capable of building an empire, one of the obsessions of Franco (as well as other totalitarian regimes of the time). In this regard, rebel spokesman Gonzalo de Aguilera, in 1937, told a journalist: "Now I hope you understand what we mean by the regeneration of Spain ... Our program consists of exterminating a third of the Spanish male population ...", and an interview can also be mentioned in an Italian newspaper where Franco describes that the war was aimed at "to save the Homeland that was sinking in the sea of dissociation and racial degeneration".

In addition to the repression throughout Spain against certain individuals, all this seems to be the source of the fierce repression, such as the Terror of Don Bruno, in Andalusia, and the no less fierce repression against Catalonia, with the addition that as a result, the attack on Catalan culture, lasted throughout the Franco regime and ended up becoming a structural element of the state.

== Post-war ==
When Heinrich Himmler visited Spain in 1940, a year after Franco's victory, he claimed to have been "shocked" by the brutality of the Falangist repression. In July 1939, the foreign minister of Fascist Italy, Galeazzo Ciano, reported of "trials going on every day at a speed which I would call almost summary... There are still a great number of shootings. In Madrid alone, between 200 and 250 a day, in Barcelona 150, in Seville 80". While authors like Payne have cast doubts on the democratic leanings of the Republic, "fascism was clearly on the other [side]."

=== Repressive laws ===
According to Beevor, Spain was an open prison for all those who opposed Franco. Until 1963, all the opponents of the Francoist State were brought before military courts. A number of repressive laws were issued, including the Law of Political Responsibilities (Ley de Responsabilidades Políticas) in February 1939, the Law of Security of State (Ley de Seguridad del Estado) in 1941 (which regarded illegal propaganda or labour strikes as military rebellion), the Law for the Repression of Masonry and Communism (Ley de Represión de la Masonería y el Comunismo) on 2 March 1940, and the Law for the Repression of Banditry and Terrorism (Ley para la represión del Bandidaje y el Terrorismo) in April 1947, which targeted the maquis. Furthermore, in 1940, the Francoist State established the Tribunal for the eradication of Freemasonry and Communism (Tribunal Especial para la Represión de la Masonería y el Comunismo).

Political parties and trade unions were forbidden except for the government party, Traditionalist Spanish Phalanx of the Councils of the National Syndicalist Offensive (FET y de las JONS), and the official trade union Spanish Syndical Organization (Sindicato Vertical). Hundreds of militants and supporters of the parties and trade unions declared illegal under Francoist Spain, such as the Spanish Socialist Workers' Party (Partido Socialista Obrero Español, PSOE); the Communist Party of Spain (Partido Comunista de España, PCE); the General Union of Workers (Unión General de Trabajadores, UGT); and the National Confederation of Labor (Confederación Nacional del Trabajo, CNT), were imprisoned or executed. The regional languages, like Basque and Catalan, were also forbidden, and the statutes of autonomy of Catalonia, Galicia, and the Basque Country were abolished. Censorship of the press (the Law of Press, passed in April 1938) and of cultural life was rigorously exercised and forbidden books destroyed.

=== Executions, forced labour and medical experiments ===
At the end of the Spanish Civil War the executions of the "enemies of the state" continued (some 50,000 people were killed), including the extrajudicial (death squad) executions of members of the Spanish maquis (anti–Francoist guerrillas) and their supporters (los enlaces, "the links"); in the province of Córdoba 220 maquis and 160 enlaces were killed. Thousands of men and women were imprisoned after the civil war in Francoist concentration camps, approximately 367,000 to 500,000 prisoners were held in 50 camps or prisons. In 1933, before the war, the prisons of Spain contained some 12,000 prisoners; just seven years later, in 1940, just one year after the end of the civil war, 280,000 prisoners were held in more than 500 prisons throughout the country. The principal purpose of the Francoist concentration camps was to classify the prisoners of war from the defeated Spanish Republic; men and women who were classified as "unrecoverable", were put to death. They continued to be used even after the White Terror, until 1947.

After the war, the Republican prisoners were sent to work in militarised penal colonies (Colonias Penales Militarizadas), penal detachments (Destacamentos Penales) and disciplinary battalions of worker-soldiers (Batallones Disciplinarios de Soldados Trabajadores). According to Beevor, 90,000 Republican prisoners were sent off to 121 labour battalions and 8,000 to military workshops. In 1939, Ciano said about the Republican prisoners of war: "They are not prisoners of war, they are slaves of war". Thousands of prisoners (15,947 in 1943) were forced to work building dams, highways, the Guadalquivir Canal (10,000 political prisoners worked on its construction between 1940 and 1962), the Carabanchel Prison, the Valley of the Fallen (Valle de los Caídos) (20,000 political prisoners worked in its construction) and in coal mines in Asturias and Leon. The severe overcrowding of the prisons (according to Antony Beevor 270,000 prisoners were spread around jails with capacity for 20,000), poor sanitary conditions and the lack of food caused thousands of deaths (4,663 prisoner deaths were recorded between 1939 and 1945 in 13 of the 50 Spanish provinces), among them the poet Miguel Hernández and the politician Julián Besteiro. New investigations suggest that the actual number of dead prisoners was much higher, with around 15,000 deaths just in 1941 (the worst year).

Just as with the death toll from executions by the Nationalists during the Civil War, historians have made different estimations the victims of the White Terror after the war. Stanley Payne estimates 30,000 executions following the end of the war. Recent searches conducted with parallel excavations of mass graves in Spain (in particular by the Association for the Recovery of Historical Memory, ARMH) estimate that the total of people executed after the war arrive at a number between 15,000 and 35,000. Julián Casanova Ruiz, nominated in 2008 among the experts in the first judicial investigation (conducted by judge Baltasar Garzón) against the Francoist crimes, estimates 50,000. Historian Josep Fontana says 25,000. According to Gabriel Jackson, the number of victims of the White Terror (executions and hunger or illness in prisons) just between 1939 and 1943 was 200,000.

A Francoist psychiatrist, Antonio Vallejo-Nájera, carried out medical experiments on prisoners in the Francoist concentration camps to "establish the bio-psych roots of Marxism".

Vallejo Najera also said that it was necessary to remove the children of the Republican women from their mothers. Thousands of children were taken from their mothers and handed over to Francoist families (in 1943 12,043). Many of the mothers were executed afterwards. "For mothers who had a baby with them – and there were many – the first sign that they were to be executed was when their infant was snatched from them. Everyone knew what this meant. A mother whose little one was taken had only a few hours left to live".

Stanley Payne observes that Franco's repression did not undergo "cumulative radicalisation" like that of Hitler; in fact, the opposite occurred, with major persecution being slowly reduced. All but 5 per cent of death sentences under Franco's rule occurred by 1941. During the next thirty months, military prosecutors sought 939 death sentences, most of which were not approved and others commuted. On October 1, 1939, all former Republican personnel serving a sentence of less than six years were pardoned. In 1940 special military judicial commissions were created to examine sentences and were given the power to confirm or reduce them but never to extend them. Later that year, provisional liberty was granted to all political prisoners serving less than six years, and in April 1941, this was also granted to those serving less than twelve years and then fourteen years in October. Provisional liberty was extended to those serving up to twenty years in December 1943. According to Julián Casanova Ruiz, Francoist repression was never exterminatory, and unlike the political repression in Nazi Germany, it became less radical as time went on, with the number of Republican political prisoners having decreased substantially by the time of Allied victory in World War II.

=== Fate of Republican exiles ===
Furthermore, hundreds of thousands were forced into exile (470,000 in 1939), with many intellectuals and artists who had supported the Republic such as Antonio Machado, Ramon J. Sender, Juan Ramón Jiménez, Rafael Alberti, Luis Cernuda, Pedro Salinas, Manuel Altolaguirre, Emilio Prados, Max Aub, Francisco Ayala, Jorge Guillén, León Felipe, Arturo Barea, Pablo Casals, Jesús Bal y Gay, Rodolfo Halffter, Julián Bautista, Salvador Bacarisse, Josep Lluís Sert, Margarita Xirgu, Maruja Mallo, Claudio Sánchez Albornoz, Américo Castro, Clara Campoamor, Victoria Kent, Pablo Picasso, Maria Luisa Algarra, Alejandro Casona, Rosa Chacel, Maria Zambrano, Josep Carner, Manuel de Falla, Paulino Masip, María Teresa León, Alfonso Castelao, Jose Gaos and Luis Buñuel.

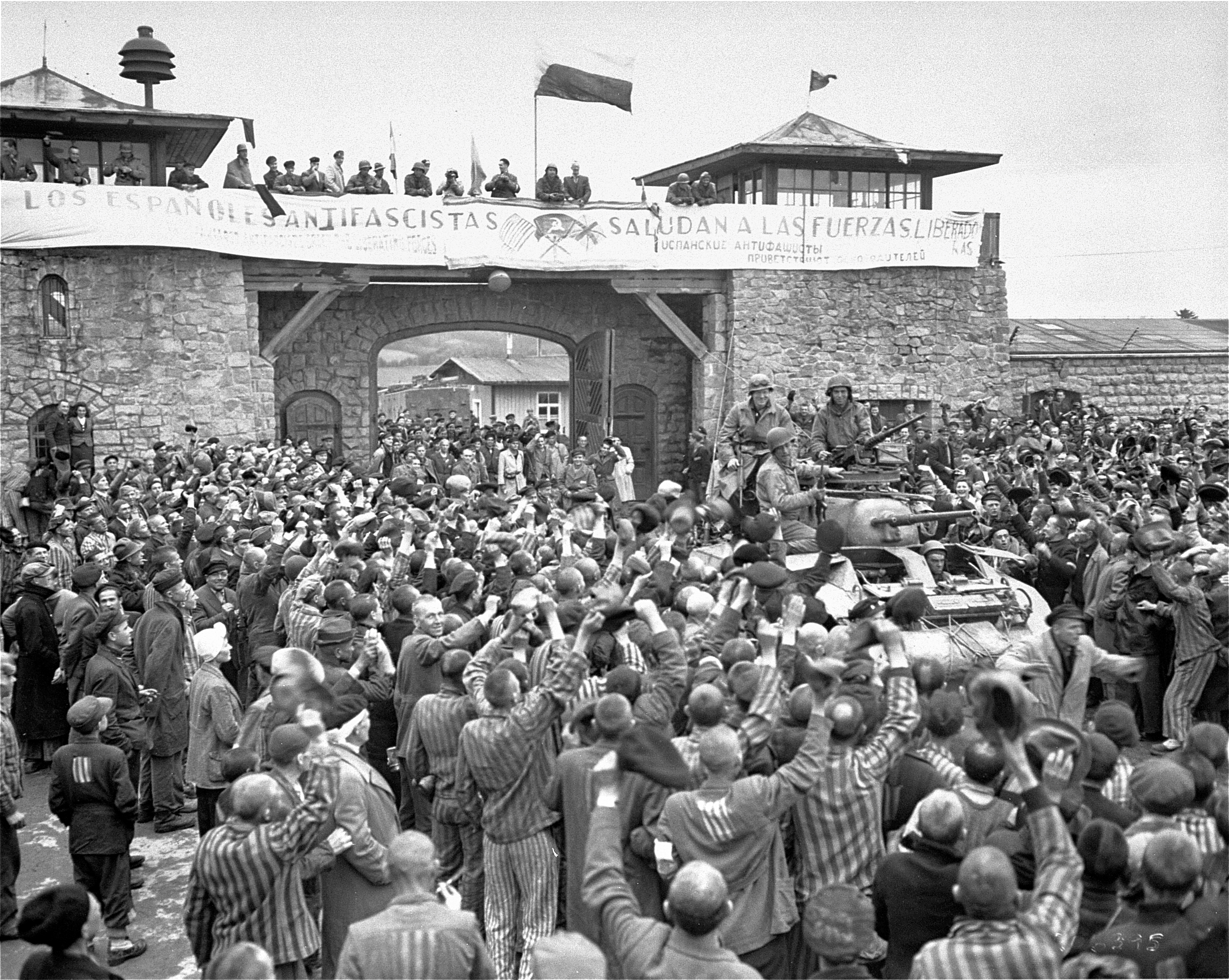
Tanks of U.S. 11th Armored Division entering the Mauthausen concentration camp; banner in Spanish reads "Antifascist Spaniards greet the forces of liberation". The photo was taken on 6 May 1945

When Nazi Germany occupied France, Franco's politicians encouraged the Germans to detain and to deport thousands of Republican refugees to the concentration camps. 15,000 Spanish Republicans were deported to Dachau, Buchenwald (including the writer Jorge Semprún), Bergen-Belsen, Sachsenhausen-Oranienburg (among them the politician Francisco Largo Caballero), Auschwitz, Flossenburg and Mauthausen (5,000 out of 7,200 Spanish prisoners at Mauthausen died there). Other Spanish Republicans were detained by the Gestapo, handed over to Spain and executed, among them Julián Zugazagoitia, Juan Peiró, Francisco Cruz Salido and Lluis Companys (president of the Generalitat of Catalonia) and another 15,000 were forced to work building the Atlantic Wall. Moreover, 4,000 Spanish Republicans were deported by the Nazis to the occupied Channel Islands and were forced to work building fortifications; only 59 survived. Thus, thousands of Spanish refugees (10,000 fighters in 1944) joined the French Resistance – among them Colonel Carlos Romero Giménez – and the Free French Forces.

=== Purges and labour discrimination ===
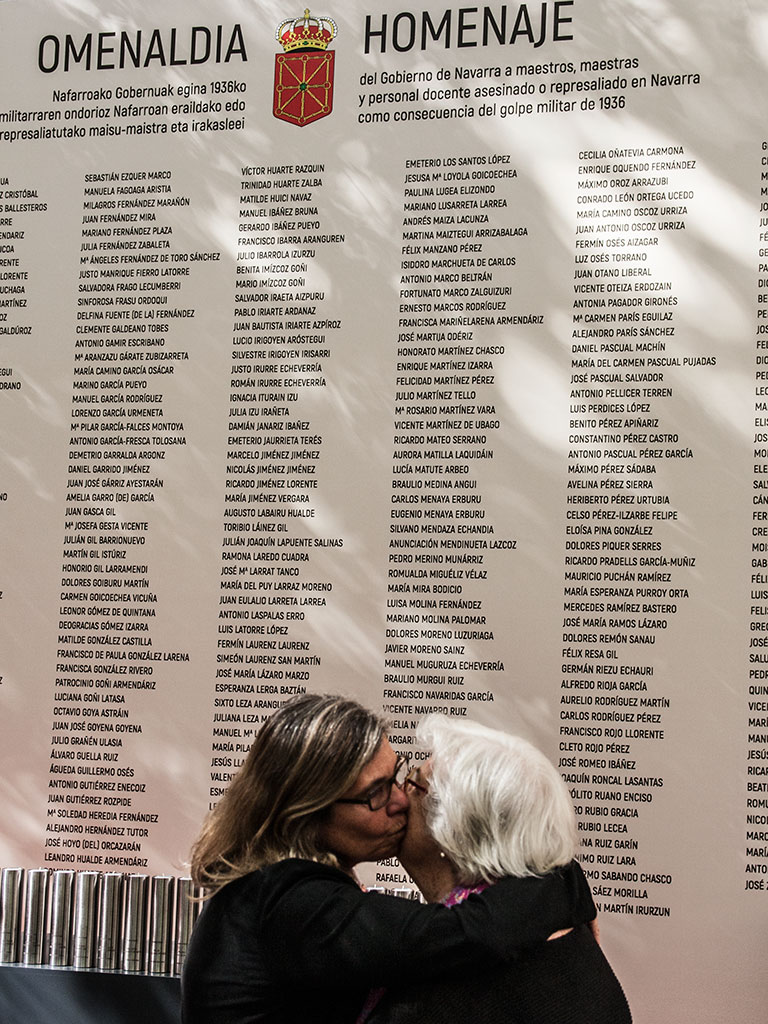
Memorial plaque in Pamplona with the list of teachers murdered or cracked down by the Spanish Nationalists, 1936 and later

The Francoist State carried out extensive purges among the civil service. Thousands of officials loyal to the Republic were expelled from the army. Thousands of university and school teachers lost their jobs (a quarter of all Spanish teachers). Priority for employment was always given to Nationalist supporters, and it was necessary to have a "good behavior" certificate from local Falangist officials and parish priests. Furthermore, the Francoist State encouraged tens of thousands of Spaniards to denounce their Republican neighbours and friends:

Although this process has not been analysed in detail, the regime did all it could to encourage denunciation. The Code of Military Justice that regulated the entire trial process effectively created a denouncer's charter and allowed prosecutions to begin through 'any denunciation worthy of consideration'. Denunciations did not even have to be signed before 1941. The radical nature of this rule outflanked even the Nazis' efforts to root out those they despised, indeed they took measures to restrict 'self-interested' denunciations. The Franco regime also went to greater lengths to encourage denunciations. Following the occupation of a village or town the new authorities set up special denunciation centres and placed announcements in newspapers and government publications exhorting people to denounce Republicans. Francoists even made it an offence not to register denunciations against Republicans known to have committed crimes.

=== Campaign against Republican women ===
Republican women were also victims of the repression in postwar Spain. Thousands of women suffered public humiliation (being paraded naked through the streets, being shaved and forced to ingest castor oil so they would soil themselves in public), sexual harassment and rape. In many cases, the houses and goods of the widows of Republicans were confiscated by the government. Thus, many Republican women, living in total poverty, were forced into prostitution. According to Paul Preston: "The increase in prostitution both benefited Francoist men who thereby slaked their lust and also reassured them that 'red' women were a fount of dirt and corruption". Furthermore, thousands of women were executed (for example the 13 roses) among them pregnant women. One judge said: "We cannot wait seven months to execute a woman".

Furthermore, under the Francoist legislation, a woman needed her husband's permission to take a job or open a bank account. Adultery by women was a crime, but adultery by the husband was a crime only if he lived with his mistress.

=== Marriage law ===
The divorce and marriage legislation of the Republic was retroactively reversed, with the divorces retroactively unmade and the children of civil marriages made illegitimate.

=== Homosexuals ===
Homosexuals were first sent to concentration camps. Then the 1954 reform of the 1933 "Ley de vagos y maleantes" ("Vagrancy Act") declared homosexuality illegal. Around 5,000 homosexuals were arrested during Francoism due to their sexual orientation.

== Aftermath ==
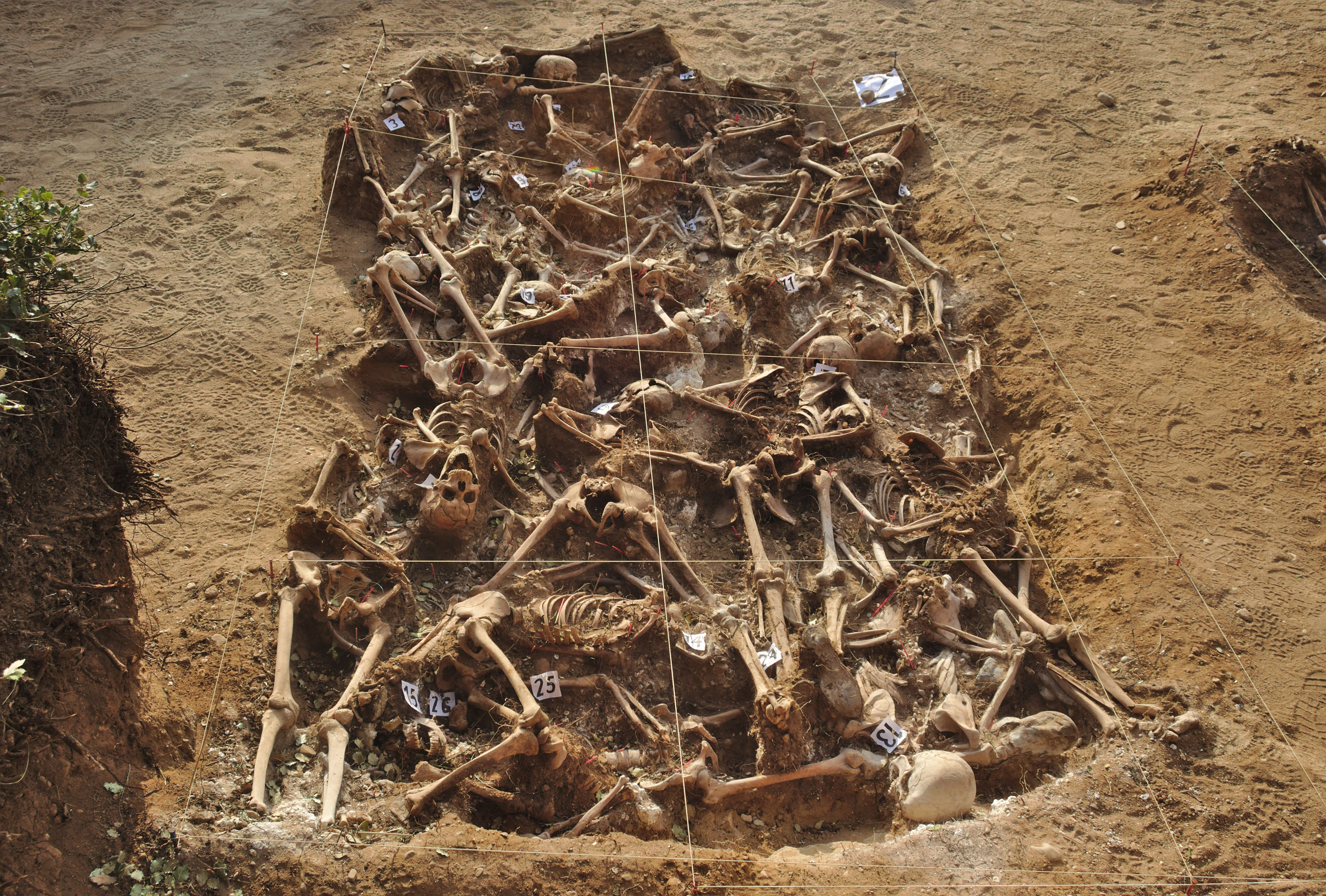
A mass grave of twenty-six republicans executed by Francoists at the beginning of the Spanish Civil War discovered in an excavation from July to August 2014 at Estépar (Burgos)

The last concentration camp, at Miranda de Ebro, was closed in 1947. By the early 1950s, the parties and trade unions made illegal by the Francoist State had been decimated by the Francoist police, and the Spanish maquis had ceased to exist as an organized resistance. Nevertheless, new forms of opposition started, such as the unrest in the universities and strikes in Barcelona, Madrid and Vizcaya. The 1960s saw the start of the labour strikes led by the illegal union trade Workers' Commissions (Comisiones Obreras) linked to the Communist Party, and the protest in the universities continued to grow. Finally, with Franco's death in 1975, the Spanish transition to democracy commenced and in 1978 the Spanish Constitution of 1978 was approved under King Juan Carlos I and Prime Minister Adolfo Suarez.

After Franco's death, the Spanish government approved the Spanish 1977 Amnesty Law (Ley de Amnistia de 1977) which granted a pardon for all political crimes committed by the supporters of the Francoist State (including the White Terror) and by the democratic opposition as part of the Pact of Forgetting. Nevertheless, in October 2008 a Spanish judge, Baltasar Garzón, of the National Court of Spain authorized, for the first time, an investigation into the disappearance and assassination of 114,000 victims of the Francoist State between 1936 and 1952. This investigation proceeded on the basis of the notion that this mass-murder constituted a crime against humanity which cannot be subject to any amnesty or statute of limitations. As a result, in May 2010, Mr. Garzón was accused of violating the terms of the general amnesty and his powers as a jurist have been suspended pending further investigation. In September 2010, the Argentine justice reopened a probe into crimes committed during the Spanish Civil War and during Franco's reign. Amnesty International, Human Rights Watch, the Council of Europe and United Nations have asked the Spanish government to investigate the crimes of Franco's reign.

In 2025, 50 years after Franco's death, the first investigation into torture was opened. This investigation focuses on cases of physical and psychological abuse perpetrated in the Via Laietana in Barcelona during 1977.

== See also ==
- Historiography on Spanish Civil War repressions (numbers)
- Anti-communist mass killings
- Law of Historical Memory
- List of people executed by Francoist Spain
- Catholicism in the Second Spanish Republic
- Esteban de Bilbao Eguía
- Tomás Domínguez Arévalo
- Forced disappearance § Spain
- Les grands cimetières sous la lune
- Policía Armada
- Red Terror (Spain)
- White Terror (Hungary)
- White Terror (Greece)
- White Terror (Russia)
- White Terror (Taiwan)
- Women's Protection Board

== Sources ==
- Beevor, Antony. The Battle for Spain; The Spanish Civil War 1936–1939. Penguin Books. 2006. London. ISBN 014303765X.
- Casanova, Julian. The Spanish Republic and civil war. Cambridge University Press. 2010. New York. ISBN 978-0521737807
- Casanova, Julían; Espinosa, Francisco; Mir, Conxita; Moreno Gómez, Francisco. Morir, matar, sobrevivir. La violencia en la dictadura de Franco. Editorial Crítica. Barcelona. 2002. ISBN 8484325067
- Espinosa, Francisco. La columna de la muerte. El avance del ejército franquista de Sevilla a Badajoz. Editorial Crítica. Barcelona. 2002. ISBN 8484324311
- Espinosa, Francisco. La justicia de Queipo. Editorial Crítica. 2006. Barcelona. ISBN 8484326918
- Espinosa, Francisco. Contra el olvido. Historia y memoria de la guerra civil. Editorial Crítica. 2006. Barcelona. ISBN 978-8484327943
- Fontana, Josep, ed. España bajo el franquismo. Editorial Crítica. 1986. Barcelona. ISBN 848432057X
- Gómez Bravo, Gutmaro and Marco, Jorge La obra del miedo. Violencia y sociedad en Espapa, 1936–1948, Península, Barcelona, 2011 ISBN 978-8499420912
- Gibson, Ian. The assassination of Federico Garcia Lorca. Penguin Books. London. 1983. ISBN 0140064737
- Graham, Helen. The Spanish Civil War. A Very Short Introduction. Oxford University Press. 2005. ISBN 978-0192803771
- Jackson, Gabriel. The Spanish Republic and the Civil War, 1931–1939. Princeton University Press. 1967. Princeton. ISBN 0691007578
- Juliá, Santos; Casanova, Julián; Solé I Sabaté, Josep Maria; Villarroya, Joan; and Moreno, Francisco. Victimas de la guerra civil. Ediciones Temas de Hoy. 1999. Madrid. ISBN 847880983X
- Moreno Gómez, Francisco. 1936: el genocidio franquista en Córdoba. Editorial Crítica. Barcelona. 2008. ISBN 978-8474236866
- Preston, Paul. The Spanish Civil War. Reaction, revolution & revenge. Harper Perennial. 2006. London. ISBN 978-0007232079
- Preston, Paul. Doves of War. Four women of Spain. Harper Perennial. London. 2002. ISBN 978-0006386940
- Richards, Michael. A Time of Silence: Civil War and the Culture of Repression in Franco's Spain, 1936–1945. Cambridge University Press. 1998.
- Sender Barayón, Ramon. A death in Zamora. Calm unity press. 2003. ISBN 1588987892
- Serrano, Secundino. Maquis. Historia de una guerrilla antifranquista. Ediciones Temas de hoy. 2001. ISBN 8484603709
- Southworth, Herbert R. El mito de la cruzada de Franco. Random House Mondadori. 2008. Barcelona. ISBN 978-8483465745
- Thomas, Hugh. The Spanish Civil War. Penguin Books. London. 2001. ISBN 978-0141011615
- Many of the books of the Documentos collection, edited by the Galician publisher Ediciós do Castro.
