= Francisco Vidal y Barraquer =

Spanish Catalan Catholic cardinal (1868–1943)

His Eminence Francisco de Asís Vidal y Barraquer
- Archbishop of Tarragona
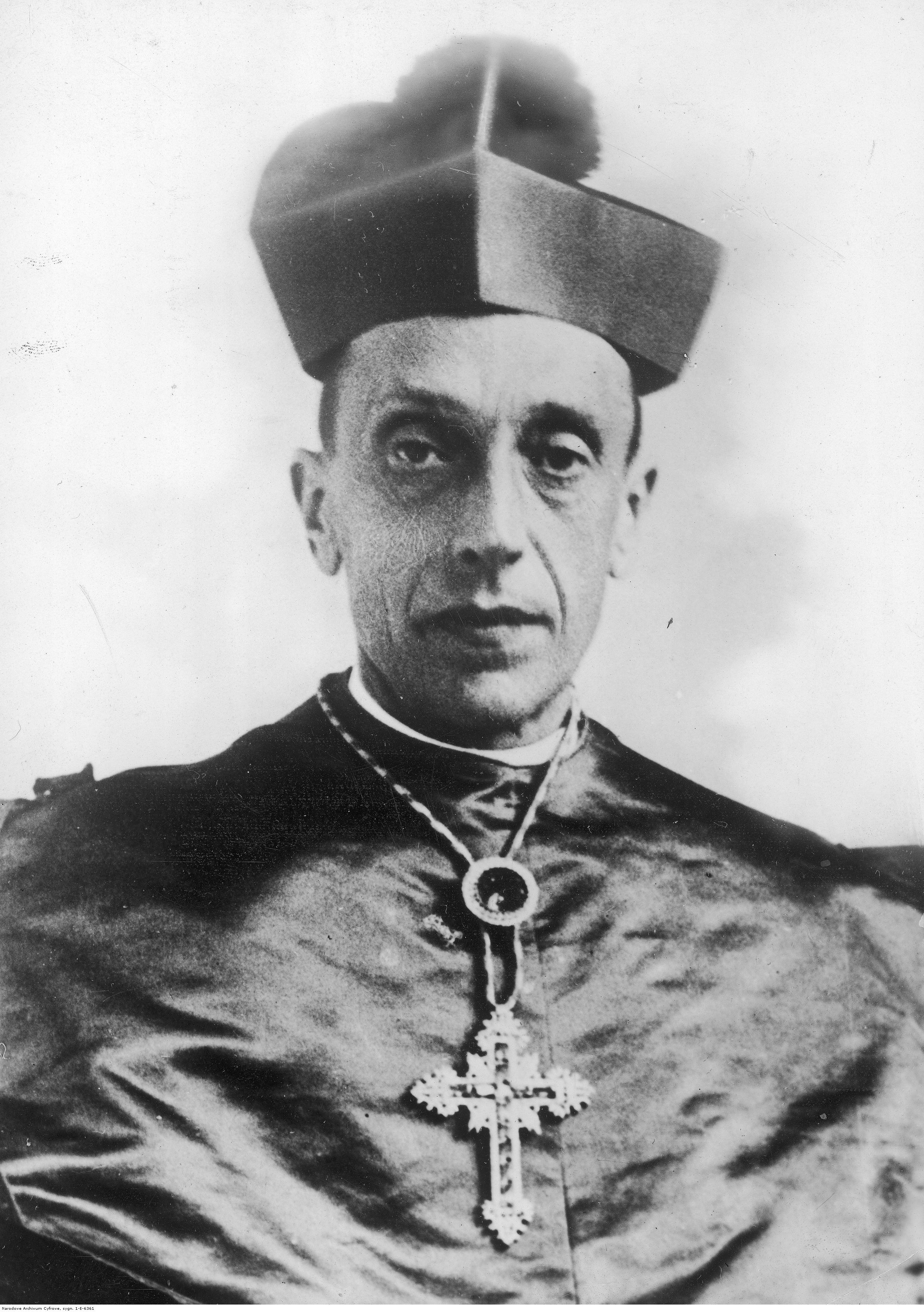
- Portrait, c. 1918–1931
- Church: Roman Catholic Church
- Appointed: 7 May 1919
- Term ended: 13 September 1943
- Predecessor: Antolín López y Peláez
- Successor: Manuel Arce y Ochotorena
- Other post: Cardinal-Priest of Santa Sabina (1921–43)
- Previous posts: Titular Bishop of Pentacomia (1913–19); Apostolic Administrator of Solsona (1913–19)

Orders
- Ordination: 17 September 1899 by Tomás Costa Fornaguera
- Consecration: 26 April 1914 by Antolín López y Peláez
- Created cardinal: 7 March 1921 by Pope Benedict XV
- Rank: Cardinal-priest

Personal details
- Born: Francisco de Asís Vidal y Barraquer; 3 October 1868 Cambrils, Spanish Kingdom
- Died: 13 September 1943 (aged 74) Foyer Saint'Elizabeth, Fribourg, Switzerland
- Buried: Tarragona Cathedral (since 1978)
- Parents: Francisco Vidal i Gimbernat; Angelina Barraquer i Roviralta
- Education: University of Barcelona; University of Madrid
- Motto: Diligite alterutrum
- Coat of arms

Styles of Francisco Vidal y Barraquer
- Reference style: His Eminence
- Spoken style: Your Eminence
- Religious style: Cardinal
- Informal style: Cardinal
- See: Tarragona

Francisco de Asís Vidal y Barraquer (Catalan: Francesc d'Assís Vidal i Barraquer, 3 October 1868 – 13 September 1943) was a Spanish Catalan cardinal of the Roman Catholic Church who served as Metropolitan Archbishop of Tarragona and Primate of Spain from 1919 until his death; he was elevated to the rank of cardinal in 1921.

He famously refused to sign the 1937 Collective Letter in which the Spanish Church's hierarchy gave their support to Francisco Franco's forces, and died in exile in Switzerland.

== Biography ==
Born in Cambrils to a family of rural landowners and liberal professionals, Francisco Vidal y Barraquer attended the Colegio San Ignacio in Manresa (1880–1885), earned his bachillerato at the seminary in Barcelona (1885), and then practiced law for a year after studying at the law faculty of Barcelona. He entered the seminary of Tarragona in 1895, and was ordained to the priesthood on 17 September 1899. On 24 September 1900 Vidal obtained his doctorate in law from the University of Madrid. He sought to join the Society of Jesus, more commonly known as the Jesuits, but his father asked Francisco to finish a career first.

Vidal then did pastoral work in Tarragona, as well as serving as fiscal (1905), provisor and acting vicar general (1905–1909) in its archdiocesan curia. He was a canon of Tarragona's cathedral chapter from 1907 to 1913, vicar general from 1909 to 1913, archpriest in 1910, and vicar capitular from October 1911 until his promotion to the episcopate.

On 10 November 1913 Vidal was appointed apostolic administrator of Solsona and titular bishop of Pentacomia. He received his episcopal consecration on 26 April 1914 from Archbishop Antolín López Peláez, with Bishops Ramón Barberá y Boada and Ramón Guillamet y Coma serving as co-consecrators, in the cathedral of Tarragona. He was senator of the Spanish kingdom for the province of Tarragona from 1914 to 1916, and renounced the mitre of Cádiz to help calm the political and social tensions of Catalonia. Vidal was later Archbishop of Tarragona on 7 May 1919.

Pope Benedict XV created him cardinal priest of Santa Sabina in the consistory of 7 March 1921. Vidal was one of the cardinal electors in the 1922 papal conclave, which selected Pope Pius XI, and later rejected Pope Pius's offer of the primatial see of Toledo. He also refused appointments to Zaragoza and to the Roman Curia. Following the Republican government's exile of Cardinal Pedro Segura y Sáenz, Vidal became the leading prelate of the Spanish Church. He made fruitless attempts to mitigate the dispositions of the constitutional project which affected the rights of the Church, and to have the Vatican accept Luis Zulueta y Escolano as its Spanish ambassador.

== Opposition to Franco ==
During the Spanish Civil War, Vidal remained in a position of neutrality. When the Revolution of 1936 broke out, the cardinal found his life in danger at the hands of leftist militias and fled to Poblet, Barcelona. Taken captive by Federacion Anarquista Iberica militiamen and on the point of being killed, his life was saved by the Catalan Culture Commissioner Ventura Gassol, a former seminarian and friend who saved the lives of several priests in Catalonia. Vidal eventually left the country and made it to the Carthusian monastery of Farneta in Lucca, Italy. Franco's troops occupied Tarragona on 15 January 1939 and Barcelona on 26 January. José de Yanguas, 11th Viscount of Santa Clara de Avedillo then urgently requested an audience with Cardinal Pacelli to express the Francoist demand that Cardinal Vidal i Barraquer be removed from his see at Tarragona. The Francoist Minister the Conde de Jordana summoned the nuncio and passed to him a memorandum that declared the government wished, since part of the clergy "has been contaminated by separatist doctrines", for Enrique Pla y Deniel to be appointed to the See of Tarragona. A liturgical rite for the reconciliation of Tarragona Cathedral—although it had not been burnt or destroyed, it was considered profane because of several acts of vandalism during the first days of the revolution—was carried out in a ritual officiated over by don José Artero, the canon of Salamanca Cathedral, in which he gave a "violent speech [that included a denunciation of] Catalan dogs! You don't deserve the sun that shines on you!"

After the death of Pius XI, Vidal i Barraquer participated in the conclave of 1939, which resulted in the election of Pope Pius XII. However, the cardinal's Catalanism, good relations with the Republican authorities of Catalonia, and his refusal to sign the joint letter of the Spanish episcopate during the civil war caused Generalissimo Franco to forbid him from returning to his archdiocese in the cardinal's lifetime; he nevertheless refused to renounce his post. Pius XII was outraged to hear that Franco desired to send Vidal, as a man hostile to the Francoist State, into exile.

Franco lifted his ban on Vidal in 1941, after he and the Vatican reached a concordat. However, the cardinal remained in Italy, and in 1943, the German occupation of Italy forced him to move to Switzerland.

Vidal was an enthusiastic champion of collegiality and Catholic Action.

Cardinal Vidal died in Fribourg, at the age of 74. He was initially buried at a Carthusian monastery in Valsainte, but his remains were transferred, in accord with his will, to Tarragona in May 1978. Vidal is buried beside his former auxiliary, Bishop Manuel Borràs, who was imprisoned and then tortured and executed by Popular Front militiamen during the civil war while Vidal was in exile.

Catholic Church titles
Preceded by Juan Benlloch y Vivó	Apostolic Administrator of Solsona; 1913–1919	Succeeded by Valentín Comellas y Santamaría
Preceded by Antolín López y Peláez	Archbishop of Tarragona; 1919–1943	Succeeded by Manuel Arce y Ochotorena
