= Benjamín de Arriba y Castro =

Spanish cardinal (1886–1973)

His Eminence Benjamín de Arriba y Castro
- Archbishop Emeritus of Tarragona
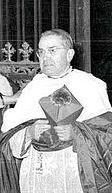
- Church: Roman Catholic Church
- Archdiocese: Tarragona
- See: Tarragona
- Appointed: 22 January 1949
- Installed: 1 July 1949
- Term ended: 19 November 1970
- Predecessor: Manuel Arce y Ochotorena
- Successor: José Pont y Gol
- Other post: Cardinal-Priest of Santi Vitale, Valeria, Gervasio e Protasio (1953-73)
- Previous posts: Bishop of Mondoñedo (1935-44); Apostolic Administrator of Mondoñedo (1944-45); Bishop of Oviedo (1944-49)

Orders
- Ordination: 14 July 1912 by Rafael Merry del Val y Zulueta
- Consecration: 16 June 1935 by Leopoldo Eijo y Garay
- Created cardinal: 12 January 1953 by Pope Pius XII
- Rank: Cardinal-Priest

Personal details
- Born: Benjamín de Arriba y Castro; 8 April 1886 Santa Maria de Peñamayor, Lugo, Kingdom of Spain
- Died: 8 March 1973 (aged 86) Quirón Clinic, Barcelona, Francoist Spain
- Parents: Antonio de Arriba; Pilar de Castro
- Education: Pontifical Gregorian University; Pontifical Academy of Saint Thomas Aquinas
- Motto: Traham eos in vinculis caritatis

Benjamín de Arriba y Castro (8 April 1886 – 8 March 1973) was a Spanish Catholic cardinal and archbishop.

== Biography ==
He studied at the seminary in Madrid, the Pontifical Gregorian University and Angelicum in Rome, and the Pontifical University of Toledo. Arriba was ordained to the priesthood by Cardinal Rafael Merry del Val on 14 July 1912 and then taught at the Madrid seminary until 1921. After becoming a canon of the cathedral chapter of Madrid on 17 February 1921, he served as secretary of the chamber and government of the same diocese from 1921 to 1930. Arriba was made provisor in 1930, and later vicar general in 1932.

On 1 May 1935, Arriba was appointed Bishop of Mondoñedo by Pope Pius XI. He received his episcopal consecration on the following 16 June from Bishop Leopoldo Eijo y Garay, with Archbishop Prudencio Melo y Alcalde and Bishop Manuel González y García serving as co-consecrators. Arriba was later named Bishop of Oviedo on 8 August 1944 and Archbishop of Tarragona on 22 January 1949.

Pope Pius XII created him Cardinal Priest of Ss. Vitale, Valeria, Gervasio e Protasio in the consistory of 12 January 1953. After participating in the 1958 papal conclave, Arriba attended the Second Vatican Council from 1962 to 1965, and served as a cardinal elector in the conclave of 1963. At the Second Vatican Council, Arriba made an intervention on behalf of the Spanish bishops during the debate on the schema on religious liberty in which he opposed the Council's efforts to modernise the Church's stance on the freedom of religion by declaring: "The fundamental principle in this matter, which must be held without dilution, is this, only the Catholic Church has the right and the duty of preaching the Gospel. Therefore, proselytism of Catholics by non-Catholics is illicit and, insofar as the common good allows, must be impeded not simply by the church but also by the state...Let the council take care not to declare the ruin of the Catholic Church in nations where Catholicism is the only religion practiced."

He resigned as Tarragona's archbishop on 19 November 1970 after a period of twenty-one years.

He died at in Barcelona, on 8 March 1973, aged 86. He is buried in a parish church in Tarragona.

Catholic Church titles
Preceded by Juan Solís y Fernández	Bishop of Mondoñedo; 1935–1944	Succeeded by Fernando Quiroga y Palacios
Preceded by Manuel Arce y Ochotorena	Bishop of Oviedo; 1944–1949	Succeeded by Francisco Lauzurica y Torralba
Preceded by Manuel Arce y Ochotorena	Archbishop of Tarragona; 1949–1970	Succeeded by José Pont y Gol
