= LGBTQ history in Spain =

This is a list of notable events in the history of LGBTQ (lesbian, gay, bisexual, transgender, and queer) that took place in Spain.

== Prior to 1600 ==
=== 6th century ===
- 589 – The Visigothic kingdom in Spain is converted from Arianism to Catholicism. This conversion leads to a revision of the law to conform to those of Catholic countries. These revisions include provisions for the persecution of gays and Jews.

=== 7th Century ===
- 693 – In Iberia, Visigothic ruler Egica of Hispania and Septimania, demanded that a Church council confront the occurrence of homosexuality in the Kingdom. The Sixteenth Council of Toledo issued a statement in response, which was adopted by Egica, stating that homosexual acts be punished by castration, exclusion from Communion, hair shearing, one hundred stripes of the lash, and banishment into exile.

=== 11th century ===
- 1061 – On April 16, a marriage between two men was recorded in Rairiz de Veiga, Galicia. Pedro Díaz and Muño Vandilaz were married by a priest in a small chapel and records of their marriage were found in the Monastery of San Salvador de Celanova.

=== 13th century ===
- 1290 – A Moor (name not recorded) was burned at the stake in Arguedas, Navarre "for lying with others", becoming the first person in modern-day Spain to be executed for sodomy.

=== 15th century ===
- 1483 – The Spanish Inquisition begins. Sodomites were stoned, castrated, and burned. Between 1540 and 1700, more than 1,600 people were prosecuted for sodomy.

== 17th century ==
No known information.

== 18th century ==
No known information.

== 19th century ==
The turning point of this trend was marked by the Enlightenment movement, during which individual freedoms began to be recognized and concluded with the elimination of the “crime of sodomy” from the Spanish Criminal Code in 1822.

== 20th century ==
- 1901 - The first same-sex marriage in Spain took place between two women, Marcela Gracia Ibeas and Elisa Sanchez Loriga, when Elisa dressed as a man. The wedding was performed, and while the priest who blessed the marriage later denounced it when made aware of the deception, the certification of the marriage was never annulled.
- 1931/1933 March of the Carolinas - A group of transvestites from Barcelona, known as "Las Carolinas", carries out the first documented LGBT demonstration in history. They do so after the destruction of a centric public bath of Barcelona which was a common LGBT meeting place at the time.

=== Franco era ===
Homosexuality was highly illegal under the dictatorship of Francisco Franco, with laws against homosexual activity vigorously enforced and homosexual people being imprisoned in large numbers. The 1954 reform of the 1933 "Ley de vagos y maleantes" ("Vagrancy Act") declared homosexuality illegal, equating it with procuring. The text of the law declares that the measures in it "are not proper punishments, but mere security measures, set with a doubly preventive end, with the purpose of collective guarantee and the aspiration of correcting those subjects fallen to the lowest levels of morality. This law is not intended to punish, but to correct and reform". However, the way the law was applied was clearly punitive and arbitrary: police would often use the Vagrancy laws against suspected political dissenters, using their homosexuality as a way to go around the judicial guarantees. The law was repealed in 1979.

However, in other cases the harassment of gay, lesbian and transgender people was clearly directed at their sexual mores, and homosexuals (mostly males) were sent to special prisons called "galerías de invertidos" ("galleries of deviants"). This was a common practice until 1975, when Franco's regime gave way to the current constitutional democracy, but in the early 70s gay prisoners were overlooked by political activism in favour of more "traditional" political dissenters. Some gay activists deplore the fact that, even today, reparations have not been made.

However, in the 1960s clandestine gay scenes began to emerge in Spain. Further establishments would start to appear in Barcelona, an especially tolerant city under Franco's regime, and in the countercultural centers of Ibiza and Sitges (a town in the province of Barcelona, Catalonia, that remains a highly popular gay tourist destination). Attitudes in greater Spain began to change with the return to democracy after Franco's death through a cultural movement known as La movida. This movement, along with growth of the gay rights movement in the rest of Europe and the Western world was a large factor in making Spain today one of Europe's most socially tolerant people.

=== Post-Franco ===
- 1977 - Spain's first gay pride demonstration is held in Barcelona, and is violently repressed by police.
- 1979 - Spain decriminalizes homosexuality as part of several post-Franco reforms; the Madrid Gay Pride Parade, known as "Orgullo Gay", is first held in June that year.
- 1987 - Antonia Soria Ramirez is the first transgender person to receive a name and gender change in the Civil Register.
- 1991 - Murder of Sonia Rescalvo Zafra in Barcelona. Became the first transgender hate crime in Spain in which neo-Nazi skinheads attacked her while sleeping in the street. Considered a "turning point" in the Trans rights movement in Catalonia.
- 1998 - Zero magazine is first published.
- 1999 - Miquel Iceta of PSC becomes the first openly LGBT member of a Regional Parliament in Spain (that of Catalonia).

== 21st century ==
=== 2000s ===
- 2000 - Jerónimo Saavedra, while a member of the Cortes Generales from Gran Canaria, becomes the first parliamentarian to come out as gay.
- 2001 - The Spanish Parliament declares it will clear Franco era criminal records for gay, lesbian, and bisexual individuals.
- 2003 - Axel Hotel, the first "heterofriendly" "gay hotel" chain opens its first location in Gaixample, Barcelona.
- 2005 - Same-sex marriage is legalized (with joint adoption).
- 2007 - Europride, the European Pride Parade, took place in Madrid. About 2.5 million people attended more than 300 events over a week in the Spanish capital to celebrate Spain as the country with the most developed LGBT rights in the world. Independent media estimated that more than 200,000 visitors came from foreign countries to join in the festivities. Madrid gay district Chueca, the biggest gay district in Europe, was the centre of the celebrations. The event was supported by the city, regional and national government and private sector which also ensured that the event was financially successful. Barcelona, Valencia and Seville also hold local Pride Parades. The same year, Jerónimo Saavedra becomes the first openly gay mayor of any provincial capital in Spain (Las Palmas de Gran Canaria). The Spanish Parliament also passes a law allowing victims of the Franco regime to apply for reparations, including LGBT individuals who were arrested under the "Vagrancy Act".
- 2008 - Barcelona hosted the Eurogames.
- 2009 - Zero ends publication due to financial difficulties.

=== 2010-present ===
- 2012 - Spain's highest court upheld the country's gay marriage law on November 6, 2012, rejecting an appeal lodged by the ruling People's Party and confirming the legality of same-sex unions.
- 2015 - married lesbian couples allowed to register both their names on their child(ren)'s certificates.
- 2018 - PSOE government under Pedro Sánchez restores measures extending free reproductive treatments for lesbians and single women to public hospitals, effective January 2019.
- 2021 -
  - Samuel Luiz is brutally assassinated in A Coruña, Galicia, in a crime motivated by homophobia. Triggers worldwide condemnation and hundreds of protests, in Madrid riot police baton charges towards the end of the spontaneous demonstration.
  - executive order to allow free IVF treatment for single women and women in same-sex relationships throughout Spain is enacted.
- 2022 - The Zerolo law, prohibiting discrimination based on sexual orientation and gender identity in employment and provision of goods and services nationwide is passed by the Cortes Generales.
- 2023 -
  - The Trans Law, prohibiting conversion therapy, prohibiting unnecessary medical interventions upon intersex infants to have their sex characteristics altered, legalizing full gender self-identification on birth certificates and other legal vital records for those aged 16 and above (and for people between 12 and 16 under certain conditions), and enshrining the right of single women and women in same-sex relationships to access IVF, is passed by the Cortes Generales.
  - right-wing government in Madrid repeals several legal protections and recognitions for trans and other LGBTQ people.

== See also ==
- LGBT rights in Spain
- Great Raid of the Pasaje Begoña – 1971 anti-LGBTQ police raid in Spain
