= Sandra Montiel =

Spanish actress and drag queen

- Born: c. 1950; Melilla, Spain
- Died: 28 May 2023
- Other name: Sandra Almodóvar

Sandra Almodóvar (c. 1950 – 28 May 2023), more widely known as Sandra Montiel, was a Spanish actress and drag queen. She was best known for her imitations of actress Sara Montiel.

== Life ==
Montiel was born in the city of Melilla, Spain, sometime in the 1950s. At the age of fourteen, she left her hometown and moved to Málaga, where she worked in the hospitality industry and began to pursue art. In 1971, she was at the Great Raid of the Pasaje Begoña, during which she stated that a police officer held a gun to her head and threatened to kill her. She was subsequently arrested and incarcerated in the Badajoz prison, where she suffered abuse from prison guards.

After her release, she pursued a career in Torremolinos imitating Sara Montiel, with whom she became friends. Montiel appeared as herself in the film Bad Education. She also appeared in La vida Chipén. In 2005, she appeared in Sandra o Luis, a documentary about her life and transition.

In 2021, she was awarded the Torremolinos medal of honour.

In 2023, the drag queen Kelly Roller performed as Montiel in the third season of Drag Race España. Montiel also sang a duet, Absolutamente, with Roller.

On the 28th of May 2023, Montiel's death at age 73 was announced in a Twitter post by Roller.
