= March of the Carolinas =

Spanish public demonstration

- Date: 9 January 1933
- Time: 8:00
- Location: Barcelona, Spain
- Type: March
- Motive: Protest the destruction of a vespasian toilet
- Participants: The Carolinas

The March of the Carolinas (Catalan: Marxa de les Carolines, Spanish: Marcha de las Carolinas) was a public demonstration held in the Spanish city of Barcelona on 9 January 1933. It was held by La Carolinas ("The Carolinas"), a group of transvestites against the destruction of a public vespasian toilet, and is amongst the first LGBTQ demonstrations in Spain.

== Background ==
In the early twentieth century, Vespasian toilets, a type of public urinal used by men, were installed in various sectors of Barcelona. These were often frequented and used by transvestites and served as a meeting place for homosexuals. Among those who used these Vespasians were La Carolinas ("The Carolinas"), a group of transvestites. They frequented a urinal located in El Raval, then known as "Chinatown".

As described by French writer Jean Genet, who lived in Barcelona in the early 1930s, in his book Diario del thief, a bomb placed in the Vespasian destroyed the urinary during the anarchist revolts that occurred in the city in 1933.

== Protest march ==
To protest against the destruction of the Vespasian, the Carloinas organized a public demonstration on 9 January 1933. It was amongst the first LGBTQ demonstrations in Spain. The protest march began at 8:00 on Avinguda del Paral·lel and continued along Carrer de Sant Pau (San Pablo street), and reached La Rambla. From there on, they marched to the Columbus Monument, and turned right to pass through the locality of the Port of Barcelona and the military barracks before reaching the point where the ruins of the urinal were located, where they placed flowers.

== Legacy ==
The march of the Carolinas is recognized as a historical event within the LGBTQ community in Catalonia. In October 2017, the Carolinas Program was launched, which seeks to protect the rights of these communities in Barcelona and was named as a tribute to the Carolinas.

In 2020, LGTBI.cat, a group representing the interests of the LGBTQ community, presented a proposal to install a replica of the Vespasian at the corner of La Rambla, in front of the Columbus Monument and the port, as a commemoration of the march of the Carolinas.

== See also ==
- LGBTQ history in Spain
