= Antonia Soria Ramirez =

Spanish trans activist (born 1944)

Antonia Soria Ramírez
- Born: Antonio Soria Ramírez; 1944 (age 80–81); Villamartín, Spain
- Other names: Mónica Soria (artist's name)
- Occupation: Artist

Antonia Soria Ramírez, also known by the artist's name Mónica Soria, (born in Villamartín, 1944) was the first trans woman in Spain to change the name and sex on her National Identity Card.

== Biography ==
Soria, daughter of agricultural workers, moved to what was then West Germany at 19 years old (now part of Germany). After working for a time in the industrial sector, she began working in the performing arts world under the name Mónica Soria.

She underwent gender-affirming surgery in 1981 in Casablanca (Morocco). In 1983, she began the legal process of changing her name and sex in the Civil Register in the municipality of Cádiz. This right was legally recognized in 1985 by judge Alberto Rodriguez, and she became the first trans person to make this change in Spain. Jaime Ollero, lead prosecutor for Provincial Audience of Cádiz, reversed the decision in 1987. However, the Supreme Court of Spain sided with Soria that same year and the change went through.

== See also ==
- LGBTQ history in Spain
- Legal status of transgender people
