= San Vitale, Rome =

Basilica of Sts. Vitalis, Valeris, Gervase and Protase
- Basilica Ss. Vitalis, Valeriae, Gervasii et Protasii(in Latin)
- Basilica di Santi Vitale e Compagni Martiri in Fovea(in Italian)
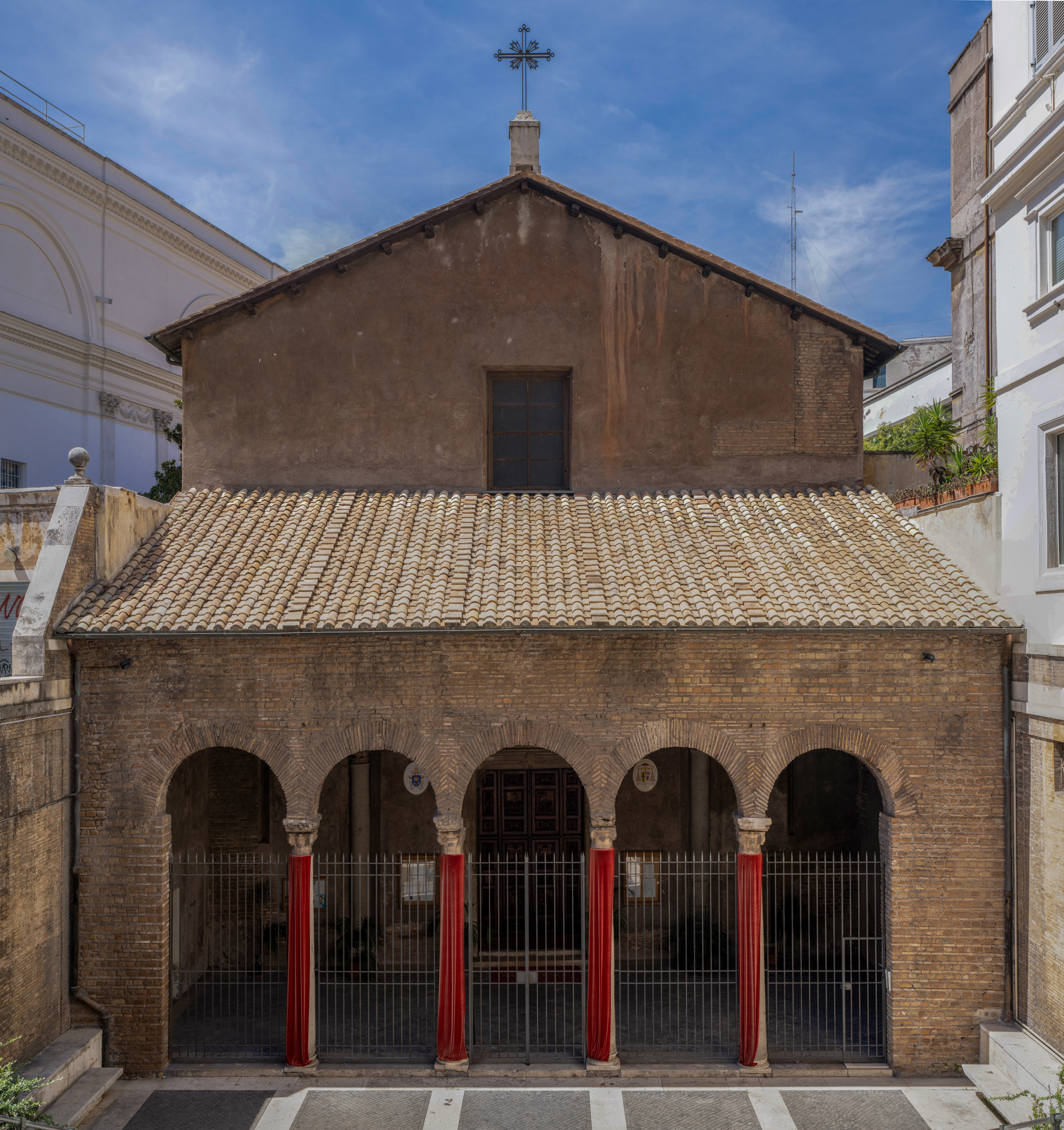
- Façade of the Basilica of San Vitale
- Click on the map for a fullscreen view
- 41°53′59″N 12°29′27″E
- Location: Via Nazionale 194/B, Rome
- Country: Italy
- Denomination: Roman Catholic
- Tradition: Roman Rite
- Website: Official website

History
- Status: Minor basilica, titular church
- Dedication: Vitalis of Milan, Valeria of Milan, Gervasius and Protasius
- Consecrated: AD 401

Architecture
- Architectural type: Church
- Style: Paleochristian
- Groundbreaking: ca. 400

Specifications
- Length: 60 metres (200 ft)
- Width: 18 metres (59 ft)

The early Christian imperial basilica of the Saints Martyrs Vitale, Valeria, Gervasio and Protasio known more commonly as the basilica of San Vitale and Compagni Martiri in Fovea (Roman Parish) or more simply as San Vitale al Quirinale. It is the oldest Catholic place of worship in the historic center of Rome, located in via Nazionale. The imperial basilica of San Vitale al Quirinale, built under the pontificate of Pope Siricius after 386 and consecrated and richly decorated by Pope Innocent in 402 (Luigi Hutter and Vincenzo Golzino) is the first public Christian basilica with a baptistery (still not found) not founded on pre-existing pagan temples, mentioned in the Liber pontificalis, built by the Emperor Theodosius at the behest of Saint Ambrose of Milan, in honor of the miraculous discovery of the bodies of martyrs Gervasius and Protasius in Milan. It is the most frescoed basilica in Rome.

== History ==
The basilica was built in 400 with funds provided by Vestina, a wealthy widow, and was consecrated by Pope Innocent I in 401/402. It was dedicated to Ss. Gervasius and Protasius, and called the "titulus Vestinae". The dedication to St. Vitalis and his family (Saint Valeria, his wife, and Sts. Gervasius and Protasius, their sons) is dated to 412. This church is recorded as Titulus Vestinae in the acts of the 499 synod of Pope Symmachus, and three priests from the church subscribed their names.

San Vitale was restored several times, most importantly when it was extensively rebuilt by Pope Sixtus IV before the Jubilee of 1475. Other interventions took place in 1512 under Cardinal del Monte; in 1598, in 1859 by the generosity of Pope Pius IX; in 1938 and 1960. Because of changes in the city over the centuries, the floor level of the church is now several metres below the level of the street on which it is located, the present-day via Nazionale.

=== Customs ===
Free bread was distributed to the poor by the church every Friday, according to the will of a gentleman from the Marches, Francesco Silla.

== Architectural and Artistic Features ==
=== Exterior ===
The portico is the most ancient part of the church, possibly dating back to the 5th century. It was altered at the end of the 16th century. The inscription on the portico, with the arms of Pope Sixtus IV, dates from this time. Pope Pius IX built the staircase to the 5th century portico in 1859.

=== Interior ===
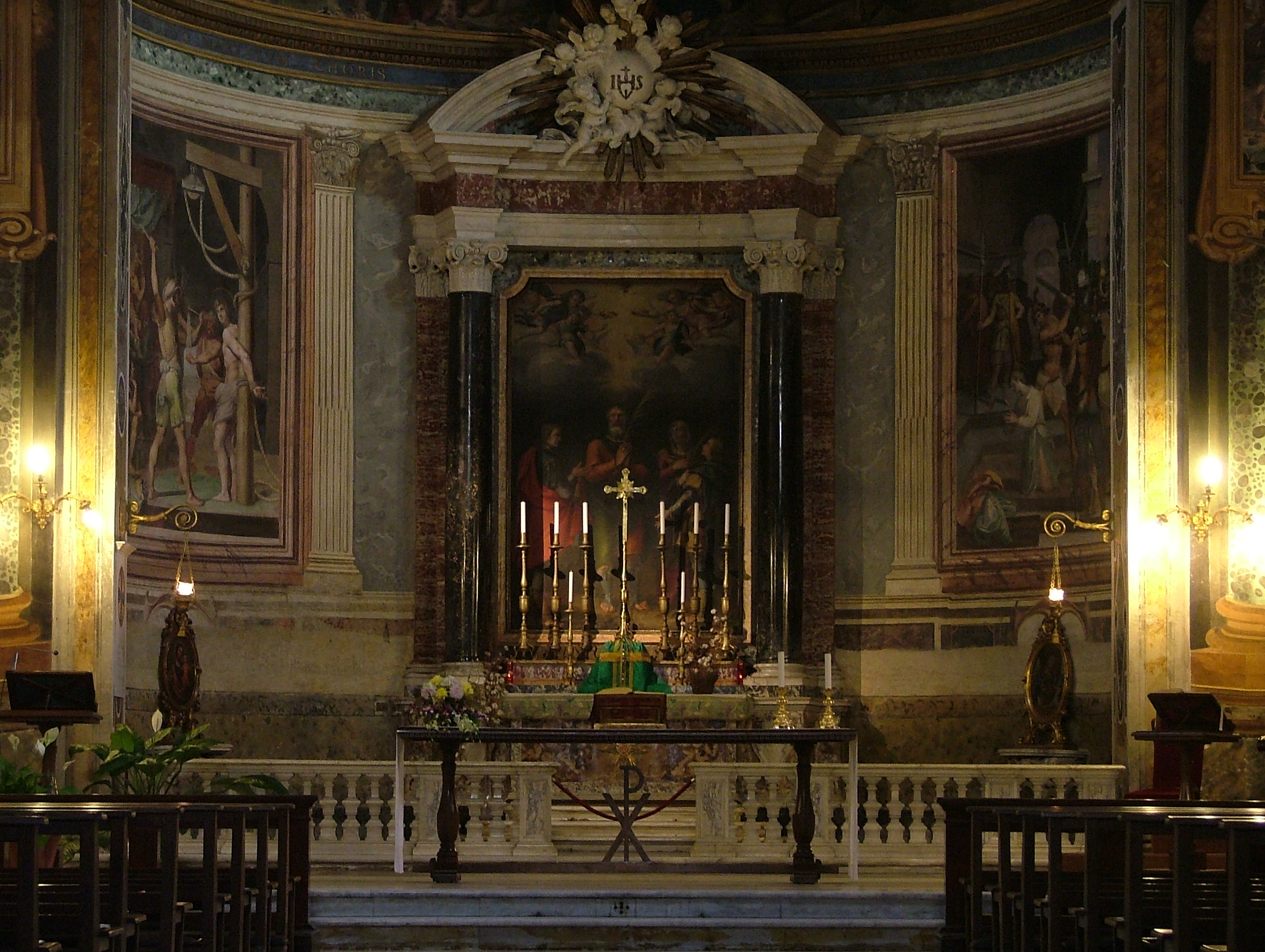
The altar and painting

The church has a single nave, with walls frescoed with scenes of martyrdom, among which a Martyrdom of St Ignatius of Antioch, in which a ruined Colosseum is depicted. The apse, a surviving part of the original 5th century church, is decorated with a fresco by Andrea Commodi, The Ascent to Calvary.

== Cardinal Priests ==
Among the cardinals who previously took their title from the church were: John Fisher, executed for treason in 1535 by Henry VIII of England; and Giovanni Maria Ciocchi del Monte, who became Pope Julius III (1550–1555). The titulus was suppressed by Pope Clement VIII in 1596. It was united with the nearby Jesuit church of S. Andrea.

The titulus was restored by Pope Leo XIII in 1880, with the appointment of Cardinal Andon Bedros IX Hassoun. The current Cardinal Priest is Cardinal Adam Maida.

- Caelius Januarius (attested 499)

...

- Lictifredus (attested 1128–1130; 1133–1140)
- Matthaeus (1130)
- Thomas (1141–1146)
- Theodinus (1166–1179)

...

- Gregorius (1202–1207)
- Joannes de Castrocoeli (1294–1295)
- Petrus de Capella (1305–1306)
- Jacques Duèse (1312–1313)
- Bertrand de la Tour, O.Min . (1320–1323)
- Joannes de Convenis (Jean de Comminges) (1327–1331)
- Elias de Nabinalis, O.Min. (1342–1348)
- Nicolaus Capocci (1350–1361)
- Guillaume de Chanac, O.S.B. (1371–1383)
- Jean de Muriolo (Murol) (1385–1399) (Avignon Obedience)
- Peter von Schaumberg (1440−1469)
- Ausiàs Despuig (1473–1477)
- Cristoforo della Rovere (1477–1478)
- Domenico della Rovere (1478–1479)
- Ferry de Clugny (1480–1482)
- Joan Margarit i Pau (1483–1484)
- Giovanni Conti (1489–1493)
- Raymond Peraudi (1496–1499)
- Jaime Serra i Cau (1500–1502)
- Gianstefano Ferrero (1502–1505)
- Antonio Ferrero (1505–1508)
- René de Prie (1509–1511)
- Antonio Maria Ciocchi del Monte (1511–1514)
- Francesco Conti (1517–1521)
- Marino Grimani (1528–1532)
- Esteban Gabriel Merino (1533–1534)
- John Fisher (1535)
- Gasparo Contarini (1535–1537)
- Giovanni Maria Ciocchi del Monte (1537–1542)
- Giovanni Morone (1542–1549)
- Filiberto Ferrero (1549)
- Giovanni Ricci (1551–1566)
- Luigi Pisani (1566–1568)
- Luigi Cornaro (1568–1569)
- Gaspar Cervantes (June 1570)
- Pietro Donato Cesi (1570–1584)
- Costanzo da Sarnano, O.Min.Conv. (1587)
- Antonio Sauli (1588–1591).

=== Restored title ===
- Andon Bedros IX Hassoun (1880–1884)
- Guglielmo Massaia, O.F.M.Cap. (1884–1889)
- Albin Dunajewski (1891–1894)
- Jan Puzyna de Kosielsko (1902–1911)
- Louis-Nazaire Bégin (1914–1925)
- Vicente Casanova y Marzol (1925–1930)
- Karel Kašpar (1935–1941)
- Manuel Arce y Ochotorena (1946–1948)
- Benjamín de Arriba y Castro (1953–1973)
- František Tomášek (1977–1992)
- Adam Maida (1994–present)

== Bibliography ==
- Armellini, Mariano (1891). Le chiese di Roma dal secolo IV al XIX (in Italian). Roma: Edizioni del Pasquino. pp. 187–189.
- Bräuer, Martin (2014). Handbuch der Kardinäle: 1846-2012 (in German). Berlin: De Gruyter. ISBN 978-3-11-026947-5.
- Eubel, Conradus, ed. (1913). Hierarchia catholica (in Latin). Vol. Tomus 1 (second ed.). Münster: Libreria Regensbergiana. (in Latin)
- Eubel, Conradus, ed. (1914). Hierarchia catholica (in Latin). Vol. Tomus 2 (second ed.). Münster: Libreria Regensbergiana.
- Gulik, Guilelmus (1923). Eubel, Conradus (ed.). Hierarchia catholica (in Latin). Vol. Tomus 3 (second ed.). Münster: Libreria Regensbergiana.
- Forcella, Vencenzo (1877). Le inscrizioni delle chiese e d'altri edifici di Roma Volume XI (Roma: L. Cecchini 1877). (in Latin and Italian)
- Gauchat, Patritius (Patrice) (1935). Hierarchia catholica. Vol. Tomus IV (1592-1667). Münster: Libraria Regensbergiana.
- Krautheimer, Richard; Spencer Corbett; Volfango Frankl (1970). Corpus basilicarum Christianarum Romae: Le basiliche cristiane antiche di Roma. Monumenti di antichità cristiana : ser. 2, v. 2. Citta del Vaticano: Pontificio istituto di archeologia cristiana. pp. 313 ff.

Preceded by Santa Teresa, Rome	Landmarks of Rome; San Vitale, Rome	Succeeded by Casa dei Cavalieri di Rodi
