= Manuel Arce y Ochotorena =

Spanish Cardinal

His Eminence Manuel Arce y Ochotorena
- Archbishop Emeritus of Tarragona
- Church: Roman Catholic Church
- Archdiocese: Tarragona
- See: Tarragona
- Appointed: 29 March 1944
- Installed: 26 October 1944
- Term ended: 16 September 1948
- Predecessor: Francisco de Asís Vidal y Barraquer
- Successor: Benjamin de Arriba y Castro
- Other post: Cardinal-Priest of Santi Vitale, Valeria, Gervasio e Protasio (1946-48)
- Previous posts: Bishop of Zamora (1929-38); Bishop of Oviedo (1938-44)

Orders
- Ordination: 17 July 1904
- Consecration: 16 June 1929 by Federico Tedeschini
- Created cardinal: 18 February 1946 by Pope Pius XII
- Rank: Cardinal-Priest

Personal details
- Born: Manuel Arce y Ochotorena; 18 August 1879 San Julián de Ororiba, Spain
- Died: 16 September 1948 (aged 69) Tarragona, Spain
- Buried: Tarragona Cathedral
- Education: Pontifical Gregorian University
- Motto: Ut in omnibus Christus formetur
- Coat of arms

Styles of Manuel Arce y Ochotorena
- Reference style: His Eminence
- Spoken style: Your Eminence
- Informal style: Cardinal
- See: Tarragona

Manuel Arce y Ochotorena (18 August 1879 – 16 September 1948) was a Spanish Cardinal of the Roman Catholic Church who served as Archbishop of Tarragona from 1944 until his death, and was elevated to the cardinalate in 1946 by Pope Pius XII.

== Biography ==
Born in Ororbia, Navarre, Manuel Arce y Ochotorena attended the seminaries in Pamplona and Zaragoza before going to Rome to study at the Pontifical Gregorian University and the Angelicum. He was ordained to the priesthood on 17 July 1904 and then taught at Pamplona's seminary. Also serving as vicar capitular and vicar general of Pamplona, Ochotorena was made an Apostolic Protonotary on 3 December 1926.

On 5 February 1929 he was appointed Bishop of Zamora by Pope Pius XI. He received his episcopal consecration on the following 16 June from Archbishop Federico Tedeschini, with Bishops Tomás Muñiz Pablos and Mateo Múgica y Urrestarazu serving as co-consecrators, in the Cathedral of Pamplona.

A witness to Ochotorena's actions during the White Terror perpetrated by Francisco Franco and the Nationalist faction during the Spanish Civil War stated: "Many priests acted very badly. The bishop of Zamora in 1936 was more or less an assassin – I don't remember his name. He must be held responsible because prisoners appealed to him to save their lives. All he would reply was that the Reds had killed more people than the falangist were killing."

Ochotorena was later made Bishop of Oviedo on 22 January 1938 and Archbishop of Tarragona on 29 March 1944. Pope Pius XII created him Cardinal-Priest of Ss. Vitale, Valeria, Gervasio e Protasio in the consistory of 18 February 1946.

The Cardinal died in Tarragona, at age 69. He is buried in the metropolitan cathedral of that same city.

Preceded by Antonio Alvaro y Ballano	Bishop of Zamora; 1929–1938	Succeeded by Jaime Font y Andreu
Preceded by Justo de Echeguren y Aldama	Bishop of Oviedo; 1938–1944	Succeeded by Benjamín de Arriba y Castro
Preceded by Francisco Vidal y Barraquer	Archbishop of Tarragona; 1944–1948	Succeeded by Benjamín de Arriba y Castro
