= Fernando Quiroga Palacios =

Spanish cardinal

His Eminence Fernando Quiroga Palacios
- Cardinal, Archbishop of Santiago de Compostela
- Church: Catholic Church
- Archdiocese: Santiago de Compostela
- Appointed: 4 June 1949
- Term ended: 7 December 1971
- Predecessor: Carmelo Ballester Nieto
- Successor: Ángel Suquía Goicoechea
- Other post: Cardinal-Priest of Sant'Agostino (1953-71)
- Previous posts: Bishop of Mondoñedo (1945-49); Apostolic Administrator of Mondoñedo (1949-50); President of the Spanish Episcopal Conference (1966-69)

Orders
- Ordination: 10 June 1922 by Florencio Cerviño González
- Consecration: 24 March 1946 by Antonio García y García
- Created cardinal: 12 January 1953 by Pius XII
- Rank: Cardinal-Priest

Personal details
- Born: Fernando Quiroga Palacios; 21 January 1900 San Pedro de Maceda, San Pedro de Maceda, Spanish Kingdom
- Died: 7 December 1971 (aged 71) Hospital San Pedro, Madrid, Spain
- Buried: Santiago de Compostela Cathedral
- Parents: Francisco Quiroga Álvarez; Teresa Palacios Vázquez
- Education: Pontifical Biblical Institute
- Motto: Omnia in caritate fiant
- Coat of arms

Styles of Fernando Quiroga Palacios
- Reference style: His Eminence
- Spoken style: Your Eminence
- Informal style: Cardinal
- See: Santiago de Compostela

Fernando Quiroga Palacios (21 January 1900 – 7 December 1971) was a Spanish Cardinal of the Roman Catholic Church who served as Archbishop of Santiago de Compostela from 1949 until his death and was elevated to the cardinalate in 1953 by Pope Pius XII.

== Biography ==
Fernando Quiroga Palacios was born in San Pedro de Maceda, near Maceda, Ourense, and studied at the seminary in Ourense, the Pontifical University of Santiago de Compostela, and the Pontifical Biblical Institute in Rome. Ordained to the priesthood on 10 June 1922, he finished his studies in 1925. While doing pastoral work in Ourense, Quiroga was also a professor and spiritual advisor at the Ourense seminary from 1925 to 1942. In 1942, he was named lectoral canon of the cathedral chapter of Valladolid, where he also did pastoral and seminary work until 1945.

On 24 November 1945 Quiroga was appointed Bishop of Mondoñedo by Pope Pius XII. He received his episcopal consecration on 24 March 1946 from Archbishop Antonio García y García, assisted by Bishops Francisco Blanco Nájera and José Soutop Vizoso, in the shrine of the Gran Promesa del Sagrado Corazón. Quiroga was advanced to Archbishop of Santiago de Compostela on 4 June 1949, and later Cardinal Priest of Sant'Agostino by Pius XII in the consistory of 12 January 1953.

He served as papal legate to the Marian Congress in Manila, Philippines, during December 1954, and was one of the cardinal electors in the 1958 papal conclave. From 1962 to 1965, Quiroga attended the Second Vatican Council, during the course of which he participated in the conclave of 1963 that selected Pope Paul VI. The Cardinal was the first President of the Spanish Episcopal Conference, serving from 1966 to 1969.

Quiroga died in Madrid, at age 71. He is buried in the Cathedral of Santiago de Compostela.

Catholic Church titles
Preceded by Benjamín de Arriba y Castro	Bishop of Mondoñedo; 1945–1949	Succeeded by Mariano Vega Mestre
Preceded by Carmelo Ballester y Nieto, CM	Archbishop of Santiago de Compostela; 1949–1971	Succeeded by Ángel Suquía Goicoechea
Preceded by Agustín Parrado y García	Cardinal Priest of Sant'Agostino; 1953–1971	Succeeded by Marcelo González Martín
