= Law of Political Responsibilities =

1939 Spanish law against the political left

Law of Political Responsibilities Ley de Responsabilidades Políticas
- As published in the Boletín Oficial del Estado in 1939

Franco I
- Territorial extent: Spain (Francoist regime)
- Enacted by: Franco I
- Enacted: 9 February 1939
- Status: Repealed

The Law of Political Responsibilities (Ley de Responsabilidades Políticas) was a law issued by Francoist Spain on 13 February 1939 two months before the end of the Spanish Civil War. The law targeted all supporters of the Second Spanish Republic and penalized membership in the Popular Front of the defeated republic.

The law was modified in 1942 and remained in force until 1966. It was promulgated to give a legal cover to the repression carried out during the dismantlement of the Spanish republican institutions, as well as to penalise those who had remained loyal to the legally established government at the time of the July 1936 military rebellion against the Spanish Republic. It was a central piece of the Francoist repression in the postwar era, and an estimated half-a-million people were prosecuted.

== History ==
=== Background ===
In February 1939, soon after the fall of Catalonia, the war was lost for the Republic, and Francisco Franco rejected the only condition of the Republican government for a surrender: a guarantee of no reprisals against the defeated Republicans. According to Antony Beevor, Nationalist Spain was "little more than an open prison for all those who did not sympathize with the regime".

According to Helen Graham, Francoist Spain was "constructed as a monolithic community by means of the brutal exclusions of specific categories of people.... Those excluded, broadly speaking, were defeated Republican constituencies who could not leave Spain... who to the Franco government were all reds and, once placed beyond the nation, they were deemed to be without rights.".

=== Promulgation ===
On 13 February 1939, three days after the fall of Catalonia, Franco published in Burgos the Law of Political Responsibilities. The law declared all those who were members of a Popular Front party from 1 October 1934 and all of those who had opposed the Spanish coup of July 1936 to be guilty of military rebellion. This included all government officers of the Republic and all members of the Republican Armed Forces.

The law was retroactive and could be applied with effects as far back as October 1934, a juridical aberration since those who had followed the laws of the legally constituted government of the Spanish Republic were suddenly prosecuted for "helping rebellion".

The law established fines and expropriations for defendants and their families (from fines of 100 pesetas to the confiscation of all the accused's assets). Furthermore, additional penalties included restriction of professional activities, limitation of freedom of residence and forfeiture of Spanish citizenship. Deceased and disappeared persons could be held responsible, and their families inherited the economic sanctions. Among the victims of the law were intellectuals and artists such as Isabel Oyarzábal Smith, Pere Bosch-Gimpera, Josep Lluís Sert and Pablo Casals.

=== Aftermath ===
The Law of Political Responsibilities was only nominally repealed in April 1945. A Comisión Liquidadora de Responsabilidades Políticas (Commission for the Discharge of Political Responsibilities) remained in operation until 1966, when the law was effectively abolished. Between 1939 and 1945, 500,000 persons out a population of 23,000,000 (2% of the population of Spain) were subject to proceedings on political responsibilities.

== See also ==
- Spanish Civil War
- White Terror (Spain)

== Sources ==
- Beevor, Antony. The Battle for Spain; The Spanish Civil War 1936-1939. Penguin Books. 2006. London. ISBN 0-14-303765-X.
- Graham, Helen. The Spanish Civil War. A Very Short Introduction. Oxford University Press. 2005. ISBN 978-0-19-280377-1
- Jackson, Gabriel. The Spanish Republic and the Civil War, 1931-1939. Princenton University Press. 1967. Princenton. ISBN 0-691-00757-8
- Preston, Paul. The Spanish Civil War. Reaction, revolution & revenge. Harper Perennial. 2006. London. ISBN 978-0-00-723207-9 ISBN 0-00-723207-1
- Thomas, Hugh. The Spanish Civil War. Penguin Books. London. 2001. ISBN 978-0-14-101161-5
