= Collective Letter of the Spanish Bishops =

Historical documents

The Collective Letter of the Spanish Bishops, 1937, was a pastoral letter written by Spanish bishops that justified Franco's uprising which precipitated the Spanish Civil War. Franco presented himself to world opinion as the defender of the Church. He was displeased at criticism levelled against him by some European Catholics who condemned the murders of priests in the Republican zone, along with those of workers and peasants in the nationalist zone. Nearly all Spanish bishops had spoken publicly in favour of the insurrection, but this was insufficient for Franco. On 10 May 1937, he asked Isidro Goma y Tomas to promulgate "a text, addressed to bishops the world over with a request that it be published by the Catholic press everywhere, which would set out truth clearly and in proper perspective" (letter, Goma to Eugenio Pacelli, 12 May 1937). Goma immediately set to work on a statement aimed at international Catholic opinion.

The letter carried the date 1 July 1937, but was not made available to a wide public until August to allow time to obtain the signatures of a small number of bishops who withheld their signature, and also to ensure that bishops all over the world, to whom the letter was addressed, received it before the press.

The letter was edited by Goma with edits by Enrique Pla y Deniel, Bishop of Salamanca, and additions from Eijo Garay, Bishop of Madrid-Alcala. The letter called the Civil War an "armed plebiscite" and discussed the conflict's meaning – its description of the killings of priests and nuns, "was to have the strongest impact upon the recipients". Goma gave enthusiastic support to Franco – though he warned against the danger of Nazi influence – "the effect on the State of a foreign ideology which tends to draw us away from Christian ideas and influences, will create enormous problems when grafting a new Spain".

== Non-signatories ==
Forty-three bishops and five chapterhouse vicars signed the letter. Five bishops did not sign the letter – though they were not equally significant.

- Francisco Vidal y Barraquer Cardinal Archbishop of Tarragona, the most significant non-signer, was in exile in Italy in 1937 – and was never allowed to return to Spain. In January 1939 Franco's ambassador to the Holy See informed the Cardinal of Tarragona he would not be allowed to return – the principal accusation against him was that he had not signed the letter. Vidal believed that in the fratricidal war in progress the Church should not identify itself with either of the two sides but work for pacification.
- Torres Ribas, the Bishop of Menorca, was aged, half blind, and out of contact in an island under Republican dominion.
- Cardinal Segura, in Rome, – Goma did not request his signature since he had resigned his post of Archbishop of Toledo.
- Javier de Irastorza Loinaz, Bishop of Orihuela-Alicante – had been ordered to reside outside his diocese since 1935.
- Mateo Mugica Urrestarazu – the Bishop of Vitoria – distressed by the number of the priests, nuns, monks and Catholic faithful that the Nationalists had massacred, would not sign a document that commended Franco's behavior. In a letter to the Holy See in June 1937 Mugica said; " According to the Spanish episcopate, justice is well administered in Franco's Spain, and this is simply not true. I possess long lists of fervent Christians and exemplary priests who have been murdered with impunity and without trial or any legal formality."
- A sixth bishop, Justi Guitart i Vilardebo, Bishop of Urgel nearly did not sign. Goma insisted "in terms that were unmistakably menacing", telling the bishop that though Mugica and Vidal both had special motives for withholding their signatures, the unanimity of the others was "guarantee enough that we are not going down the wrong road". Guitart rejected this and similar threats from Goma. He finally agreed to sign because Vidal y Barraquer agreed he should do so.

== Limitations of the letter ==
Alvarez Bolado, a writer on the religious factor in the Civil War, highlighted four limitations of the letter ;

- The trivialization of the social conflict – Goma too easily absolves the Spanish Church of the accusation that, in common with the rich, it forgot the poor and that electorally the Church had identified itself with the Right, which opposed social reform, and, when it won the elections in 1933, repealed the best of the moderate changes that had been brought in 1931–1933.
- The simplification of the Basque problem.
- An absence of a democratic sensibility in politics. It was too simplistic to categorize the Republican side as Communists, while the praise bestowed on the Franco side revealed Goma's ties with the ultra-rightist group Acción Española.
- Insufficiency and concealment of information concerning repression in the nationalist zone – "the gravest defect of the document".
