= Great Raid of the Pasaje Begoña =

1971 anti-LGBTQ police raid in Spain

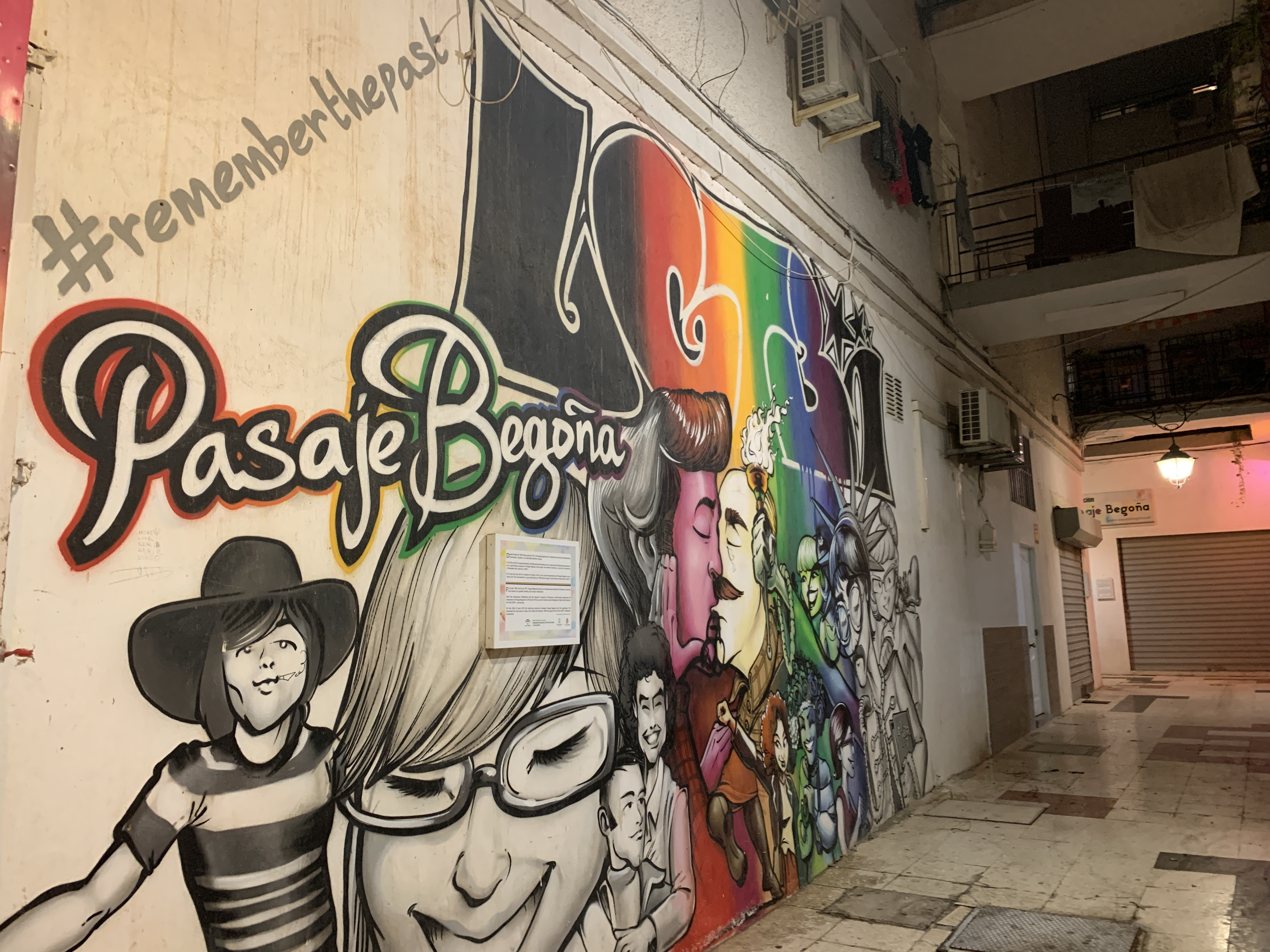
- The Pasaje Begoña alley in the 2020s
- Native name: Gran redada del Pasaje Begoña
- Date: June 25, 1971-June 26, 1971
- Location: Pasaje Begoña, Torremolinos, Francoist Spain
- Type: Police raid on the LGBT+ community
- Target: LGBT-friendly businesses and nightclubs
- Arrests: 100-300

On the night of 25 through 26 June 1971, police raided a number of businesses along the Pasaje Begoña, an alley in Torremolinos, Spain known for its LGBTQ friendly businesses and clubs. The event would later be known as the Great Raid of the Pasaje Begoña, (Spanish: Gran redada del Pasaje Begoña, literally "Grand Raid of the Begoña Passage"). Twenty-three businesses were closed, several were fined, and between one and three hundred people, many of which were tourists, were arrested. The local police were accused of perpetrating homophobic and transphobic violence during the raid, coercing confessions, and threatening journalists in its aftermath. As a result of the raid, the LGBTQ community in Torremolinos were dispersed and tourism in the area decreased.

== Background ==
=== LGBT rights in Francoist Spain ===
In Francoist Spain, same-sex relations were illegal and punishable with a three-year prison sentence under the 1970 Law on Social Danger and social rehabilitation.

=== Pasaje Begoña ===
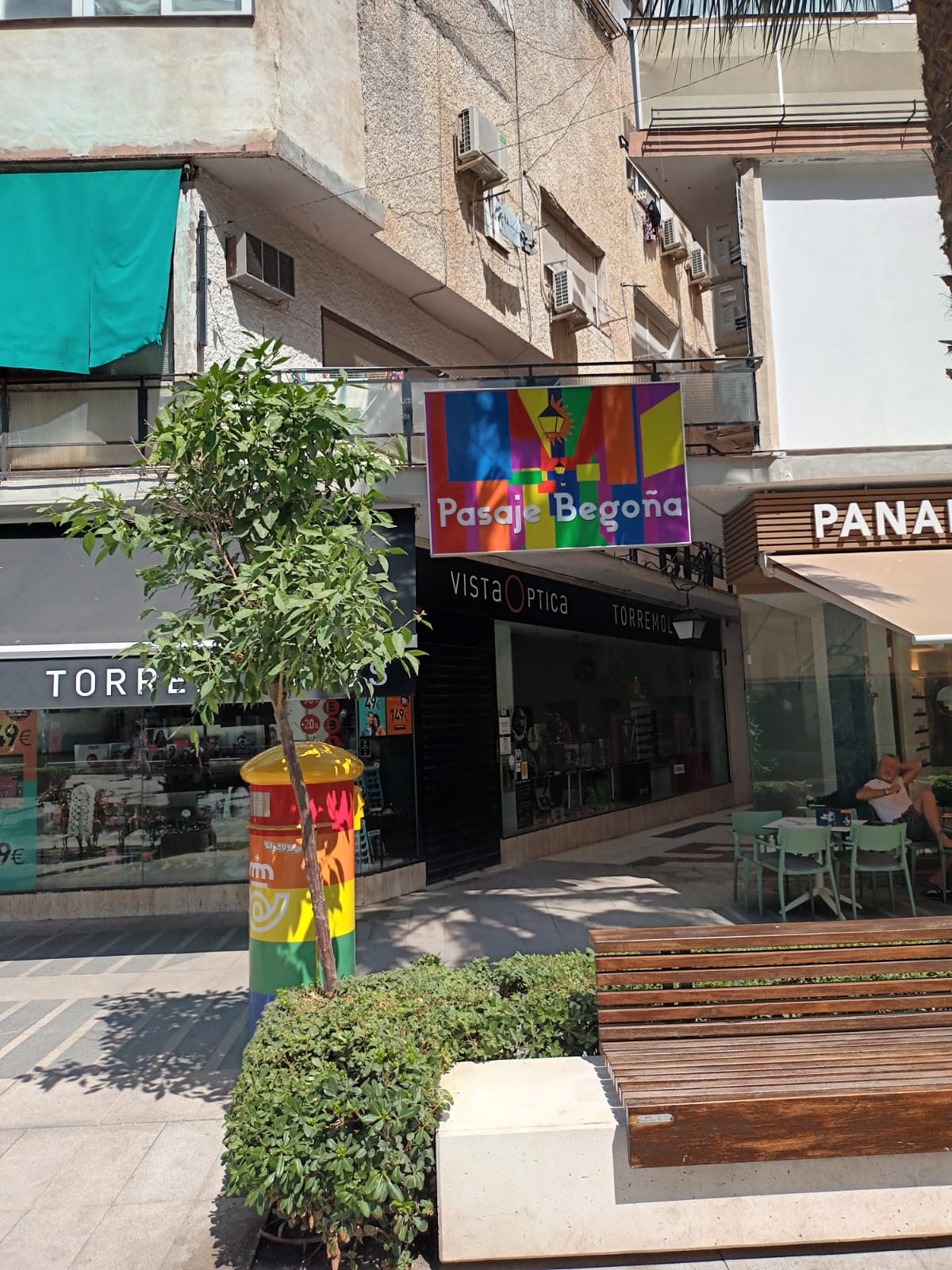
The alley in 2024

During the 1950s, Torremolinos became one of the many towns along the Costa del Sol to become a tourist destination. This shift was supported by the Spanish government, with new hotels and bars built to help strengthen the local economy. However, many of the establishments were accepting of the LGBT community, or opened or run by LGBT individuals themselves. One such bar was Tony's bar, opened in 1962 and run by a British couple. It is believed to be the first gay bar in Spain, and is credited with helping to establish the Pasaje Begoña, where it was located, as a popular destination for European LGBT tourists throughout the 1960s. Small raids targeting individuals occurred during this period, but they were not taken seriously by tourists, locals, or the police.

== Raid ==
On the night of 25 June 1971 and the early morning of 26 June, armed police raided the nightclubs along Pasaje Begoña, targeting the owners and patrons of gay bars, as well as individual LGBT people in the alley. Police officers with submachine guns stood outside the alley while others entered businesses, closing them and arresting the customers.

The police had to use a variety of police vans, municipal vehicles, as well as multiple buses to transport those arrested. They took them first to the local police station, which lacked enough open cells to hold everybody. As a result, the detainees were held outside, in an alley near a post office, for a period of several hours.

According to Sandra Montiel, a transgender singer present during the raid, she was subjected to homophobic and transphobic abuse during the raid by police officers. As she was being arrested, a police officer threatened to shoot her in the head because of her gender identity. She also reported that, while she was in police custody, more threats of violence were later used to coerce her into signing a confession. She also heard other detainees being physically abused by the police, and people begging for help in English.

The exact number of people arrested is disputed, with sources typically listing between one and three hundred people arrested. A significant number of these were tourists from other parts of Europe, including West Germany. 119 arrested were taken to be identified in Málaga. Individuals were fined between two and three thousand pesetas. Twenty-three establishments were closed and fined between ten and twenty thousand pesetas. According to the police, they only closed eleven businesses, asserting that the remaining twelve had been instead closed by their owners out of respect for public morality.

=== Motivation ===
The cause for the raid was contested at the time, but widely acknowledged in the twenty-first century as an attempt to suppress Spain's LGBT community. Some contemporaneous sources stated that it was ordered by the recently appointed governor of Malaga, Víctor Arroyo. A book published by the Regional Government of Andalusia in 2021 disputes this, arguing that the order for the raid came from a higher position of government. According to local press reports, and the Spanish police at the time, the purpose of the raid was to improve the city of Torremolinos, and clean the area. Other rumours included that the raid was ordered to appease Arroyo's wife, who had visited the alley earlier that day and taken a dislike to it, or that it was ordered as a favour to remove competition. In the days leading up to the raid, the owner of one bar was warned that a large-scale raid would occur, having been told this information by a member of the police. He did not take the warning seriously.

== Aftermath ==
Many foreign nationals were deported from Spain, with others choosing to leave Torremolinos in favour of other tourist destinations such as Ibiza, or Barcelona. Businesses that attempted to re-open were threatened with closure and even more fines. Some individuals arrested were told they would be placed under police surveillance, and many faced prison sentences. Tourism in Spain would soon slow due to the oil crisis, but the 1971 raid caused a sharp decrease in activity in the area surrounding the Pasaje Begoña. While other gay bars and other LGBT-friendly establishments remained open, they were much more dispersed than those in the alley.

=== Newspaper coverage ===
Within Spain, newspaper reports and press releases about the incident focused on the raid's attempt to preserve morality and public decency. The ABC newspaper, when reporting on the raid at the time, stated that those arrested had mostly been homeless people, prostitutes, or drug addicts. According to the owner of one local newspaper, the local police confiscated tape recorders from his journalists. These tape recorders were meant to have contained accounts of abuse and mistreatment those arrested had faced.

Due to the high-profile nature and connections of those arrested, the incident was reported on abroad and received considerable international attention. The contents and focus of reports varied, depending on the newspaper's location. Newspapers based outside of Spain, particularly in West Germany, where many of the arrested were from, focused on the raid's political nature, allegations of police brutality, and the mistreatment of those arrested. The Spanish consulate monitored these reports, raising an internal warning that if the international pressure continued, it would cause problems for the rest of the Spanish government.

In response to the mounting international pressure and attention, the Spanish media and government asserted that the foreign response was a politically motivated attack against the country.

=== Subsequent raids and closures ===
In order to prevent the area from re-opening, smaller raids were conducted by local police regularly for the next four years, throughout the rest of Spain's time as a dictatorship. Businesses attempting to re-open were threatened with closure and even more fines. In particular, on July 25, 1971, more raids where conducted on the Villa Ariel, a nightclub that attempted to reopen. On that night, twenty-one more people were arrested and charged under the country's laws prohibiting same-sex relationships.

== Legacy ==
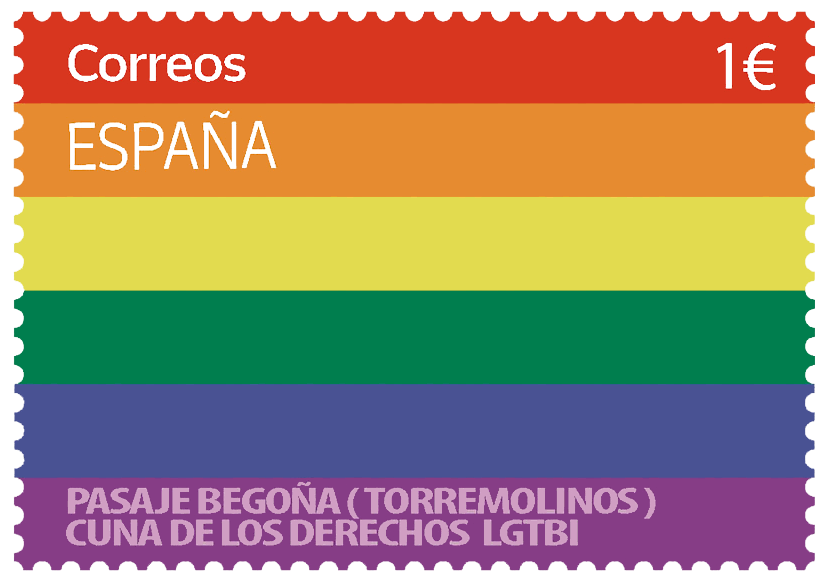
2020 stamp commemorating the event

At some point during the 1980s, Pasaje Begoña was renamed to Pasaje Gil Vicente. As the historical significance of the street become more widely recognized, it was changed back in 2019. As of 2021, many businesses in the alley had names referencing those raided and closed in 1971.

In the twenty-first century, interviews facilitated and archives organized by the Pablo de Olavide University helped to revive public interest in the raid and its impact on LGBT history in Spain, with many sources describing it the "Spanish Stonewall".

In 2021, survivor Sandra Montiel was given the Torremolinos medal of honour in a ceremony honoring the 50th anniversary and formally acknowledging the raid's impact on LGBT culture in Spain. In June 2020 the Spanish postal service also issued a rainbow-patterned stamp commemorating the raid.

== Bibliography ==
- Cáceres Feria, Rafael; Valcuende del Río, José María; Parrilla Molina, Juan Carlos; Pérez García, Jorge-Martín (2021). El Pasaje Begoña en La memoria Lgtbi+. Libertad y represión de la sexualidad en Torremolinos durante el franquismo (1962-1971) [The Pasaje Begoña in the LGBT+ Memory: freedom and repression of sexuality in Torremolinos in Francoist Spain(1962-1971)] (PDF) (in Spanish). Sevilla: Regional Government of Andalusia. ISBN 978-84-09-31726-4. Archived (PDF) from the original on 25 April 2022.
