= Agustín Parrado y García =

Spanish Cardinal

His Eminence Agustín Parrado y García
- Archbishop of Granada
- Church: Roman Catholic Church
- Archdiocese: Granada
- See: Granada
- Appointed: 4 April 1934
- Term ended: 8 October 1946
- Predecessor: Vicente Casanova y Marzol
- Successor: Balbino Santos y Olivera
- Other post: Cardinal-Priest of Sant'Agostino (1946)
- Previous posts: Bishop of Palencia (1925-34); Apostolic Administrator of Jaén (1936-42); Apostolic Administrator of Gaudix (1939-42)

Orders
- Ordination: 21 September 1895
- Consecration: 16 August 1925 by Julián de Diego y García Alcolea
- Created cardinal: 18 February 1946 by Pope Pius XII
- Rank: Cardinal-Priest

Personal details
- Born: Agustín Parrado y García; 5 October 1872 Fuensaldaña, Spain
- Died: 8 October 1946 (aged 74) Granada, Spain
- Buried: Granada Cathedral
- Motto: Tibi post haec, fili mi, ultra quid faciam
- Coat of arms

Styles of Agustín Parrado y García
- Reference style: His Eminence
- Spoken style: Your Eminence
- Informal style: Cardinal
- See: Granada

Agustín Parrado y García (5 October 1872—8 October 1946) was a Spanish Cardinal of the Roman Catholic Church who served as Archbishop of Granada from 1934 until his death, and was elevated to the cardinalate in 1946 by Pope Pius XII.

== Biography ==
Agustín Parrado y García was born in Fuensaldaña, and studied at the seminary in Valladolid before being ordained to the priesthood on 21 September 1895. He then taught at the Valladolid seminary and at the Pontifical University of Valladolid. After becoming Vice-Rector of the seminary of Valladolid, Parrado was made canon penitentiary of the cathedral chapter of Astorga, director of its diocesan newspaper, and an official of the diocesan curia.

He was later made a diocesan official of Salamanca, dean of the Theological Faculty at the Pontifical University of Salamanca, and Domestic Prelate of His Holiness on 14 June 1922.

On 20 May 1925, Parrado was appointed Bishop of Palencia by Pope Benedict XV. He received his episcopal consecration in the same year from Archbishop Julián de Diego y García Alcolea, with Bishops Manuel de Castro Alonso and Manuel María Vidal y Boullón serving as co-consecrators, in the Cathedral of Salamanca.

Parrado was later named Archbishop of Granada, ending a nearly four-year-long vacancy, on 7 March 1934 and an Assistant at the Pontifical Throne on 17 October 1945. Pope Pius XII created him Cardinal Priest of Sant'Agostino in the consistory of 22 February 1946.

The Cardinal died in Granada, at age 74. He is buried in the metropolitan cathedral of Granada.

Catholic Church titles
Preceded by Ramón Barberá y Boada	Bishop of Palencia; 1925–1934	Succeeded by Blessed Manuel González y García
Preceded by Vicente Casanova y Marzol	Archbishop of Granada; 1934–1946	Succeeded by Balbino Santos y Olivera
Preceded by Aleksander Kakowski	Cardinal Priest of Sant'Agostino; Feb 1946–Oct 1946	Succeeded by Fernando Quiroga y Palacios
