= Iker Casillas =

Spanish footballer (born 1981)

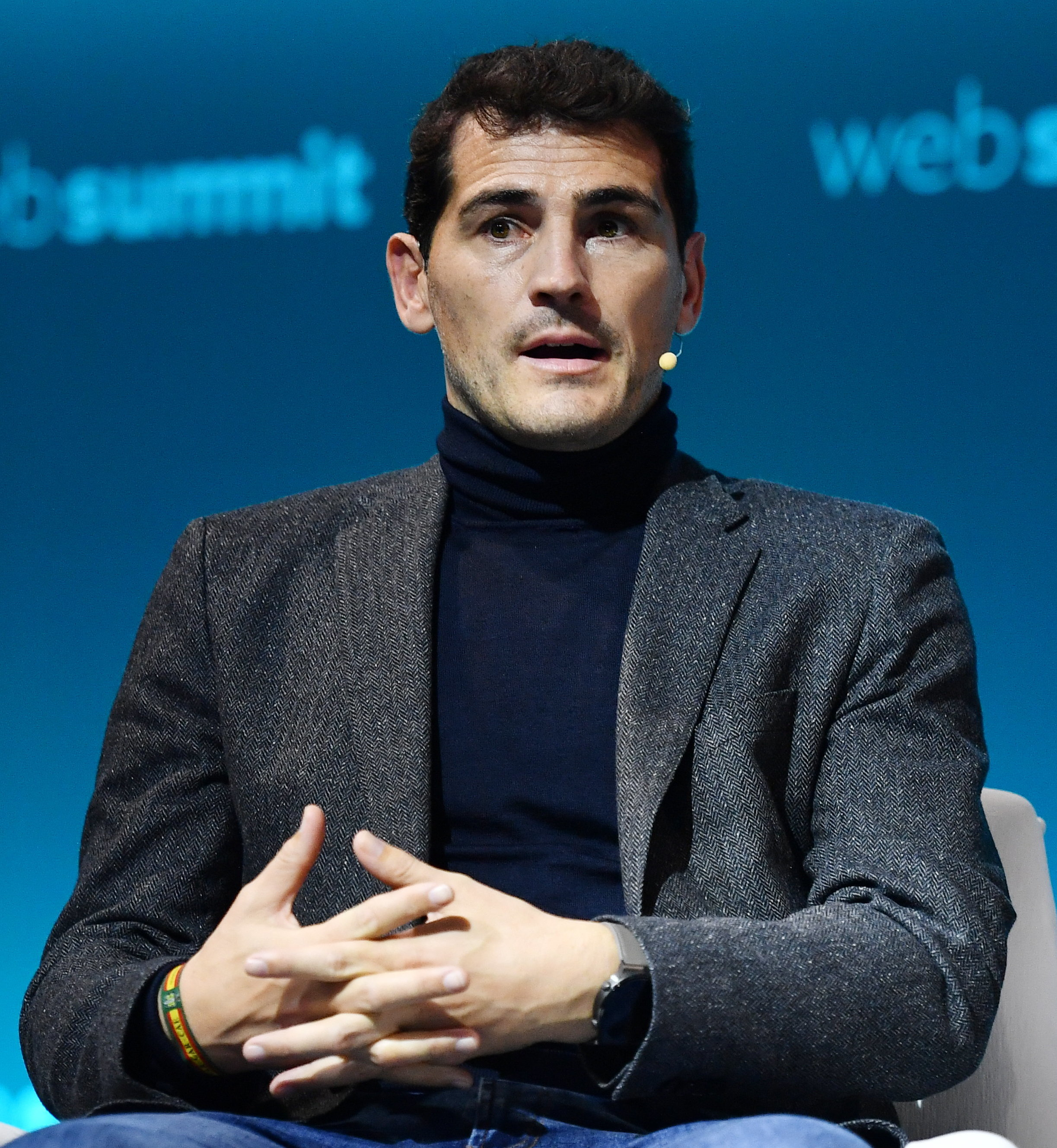
- Casillas in 2021

Personal information
- Full name: Iker Casillas Fernández
- Date of birth: 20 May 1981 (age 45)
- Place of birth: Móstoles, Madrid, Spain
- Height: 1.85 m (6 ft 1 in)
- Position: Goalkeeper

Youth career
- 1990–1998: Real Madrid

Senior career*
| Years | Team | Apps | (Gls) |
| 1998–1999 | Real Madrid C | 27 | (0) |
| 1999–2000 | Real Madrid B | 4 | (0) |
| 1999–2015 | Real Madrid | 510 | (0) |
| 2015–2020 | Porto | 116 | (0) |
| Total | | 657 | (0) |

International career
| 1996 | Spain U15 | 1 | (0) |
| 1996–1998 | Spain U16 | 19 | (0) |
| 1997–1999 | Spain U17 | 10 | (0) |
| 1999 | Spain U18 | 4 | (0) |
| 1999 | Spain U20 | 2 | (0) |
| 1999–2000 | Spain U21 | 5 | (0) |
| 2000–2016 | Spain | 167 | (0) |
Medal record
Men's football
Representing Spain
FIFA World Cup
| Winner | 2010 South Africa | Team |
UEFA European Championship
| Winner | 2008 Austria-Switzerland | Team |
| Winner | 2012 Poland-Ukraine | Team |
FIFA Confederations Cup
| Runner-up | 2013 Brazil |
| Third place | 2009 South Africa |
FIFA U-20 World Cup
| Winner | 1999 Nigeria |
FIFA U-17 World Cup
| Third place | 1997 Egypt | Team |
UEFA European Under-16 Championship
| Winner | 1997 Germany |
- * Club domestic league appearances and goals

Iker Casillas Fernández (Spanish pronunciation: [ˈikeɾ kaˈsiʎas feɾˈnandeθ]; born 20 May 1981) is a Spanish former professional footballer who played as a goalkeeper and currently works as a football commentator. Dubbed "San Iker" ("Saint Iker"), he is considered to be one of the greatest goalkeepers of all time. He is known for his athleticism, quick reactions, and outstanding shot-stopping ability. Having spent the majority of his career at Real Madrid, Casillas is one of the few players to achieve over 1,050 professional career matches, and also holds the record for the most clean sheets for the Spain national team. Currently, he works for RTVE, Movistar Plus+ and Azteca Deportes.

At club level, Casillas started his career with the Real Madrid youth team, eventually gaining promotion to the main team in 1999, where he became the youngest goalkeeper to play in the final of the Champions League, and to win the title, at 19 years and four days. Casillas became the first choice goalkeeper at Real Madrid, winning two Champions Leagues and La Liga titles in his first three seasons, establishing himself as one of the best goalkeepers in the world. During his highly successful career in Madrid, Casillas won all major club titles, including five La Liga titles, four Supercopa de España titles, two Copa del Rey titles, three UEFA Champions Leagues, two UEFA Super Cups, two Intercontinental Cups and the FIFA Club World Cup. After 25 years with Real Madrid, Casillas joined FC Porto in 2015 on a free transfer, where he won the Primeira Liga and a Supertaça Cândido de Oliveira title. While at Porto, he broke the record for most consecutive seasons played in the UEFA Champions League (20) and amassed the most appearances in the competition (177). He ended his playing career in February 2020, after almost a year on the sidelines following a heart attack he suffered during a training session with Porto in May 2019.

With 167 international caps, Casillas has the second most appearances for the Spain national team, making him the eighteenth-most capped footballer of all time. An unused substitute at UEFA Euro 2000, Casillas became the nation's first choice goalkeeper at the 2002 World Cup, and went on to play at UEFA Euro 2004 and the 2006 World Cup. In 2008, he was made captain, and went on to lead the team to the European Championship title that year. Casillas also led Spain to their first World Cup win in 2010, where he kept a joint–record five clean sheets, winning the Yashin Award for the best goalkeeper of the tournament. Spain became the first nation to retain the European Championship, winning the title again in 2012, where he set the record for most consecutive minutes without conceding a goal in the competition (509). In 2014, Casillas became one of six players to represent Spain at four World Cups.

In 2008, Casillas placed fourth overall in the Ballon d'Or, and was selected for the UEFA Team of the Year six consecutive times from 2007 to 2012, a record for a goalkeeper. Casillas was also selected in the FIFPro World XI a record five times for a goalkeeper, and was named as the IFFHS World's Best Goalkeeper a record five times, alongside Gianluigi Buffon and Manuel Neuer. He was named as the second-best goalkeeper of the 21st century, behind Gigi Buffon, and the second-best goalkeeper of the past 25 years by the same organisation.

== Early life ==
Casillas was born on 20 May 1981 in Móstoles, province of Madrid, to José Luis Casillas, a civil servant in the Ministry of Education, and María del Carmen Fernández González, a hairdresser. Both his parents had moved from their home of Navalacruz, Ávila.

Casillas has a brother, seven years younger, named Unai, who used to play as a central midfielder for CD Móstoles. The brothers' forenames are of Basque origin due to a family connection to the region: their paternal grandfather – an officer in the Civil Guard – was posted to Bilbao and settled in the city, their father grew up there as a result and Iker also lived in the area as a small child before the family relocated to Madrid.

On one occasion as a young child, when he was seven or eight, Casillas forgot to post his father's football predictions for the weekend; his father had correctly predicted all 15 results, and the family lost out on an estimated €1.2 million (£1 million).

== Club career ==
=== Real Madrid ===
==== Early years ====
Casillas began his career in Real Madrid's youth system, known as La Fábrica, during the 1990–91 season. On 27 November 1997, at age 16 and still a junior, he was first called up to the senior team squad to face Rosenborg in the UEFA Champions League, although he remained on the bench throughout. After spending a season with the C-team in the fourth tier, during which they won their regional group, he came into contention as the club's first-choice between the posts. In starting the 1999–2000 UEFA Champions League group stage fixture against Olympiakos on 15 September 1999, he became the youngest goalkeeper ever to feature in the competition at the time, aged 18 years and 177 days; a record which was only broken in October 2017 by Mile Svilar. Three days earlier, Casillas had made his La Liga debut in a 2–2 draw against Athletic Bilbao at San Mamés Stadium. In May 2000, he became the youngest ever goalkeeper to play in and win a Champions League final when Real Madrid defeated Valencia 3–0, just four days after his 19th birthday.

==== 2001–2010 ====
Casillas lost his place in the side to backup César Sánchez after poor performances in the 2001–02 campaign, but redeemed himself when Sánchez suffered an injury in the final minutes of the 2002 Champions League Final. Casillas came on and pulled off several key saves to deny a rampant Bayer Leverkusen the Champions League crown. Real Madrid won 2–1.

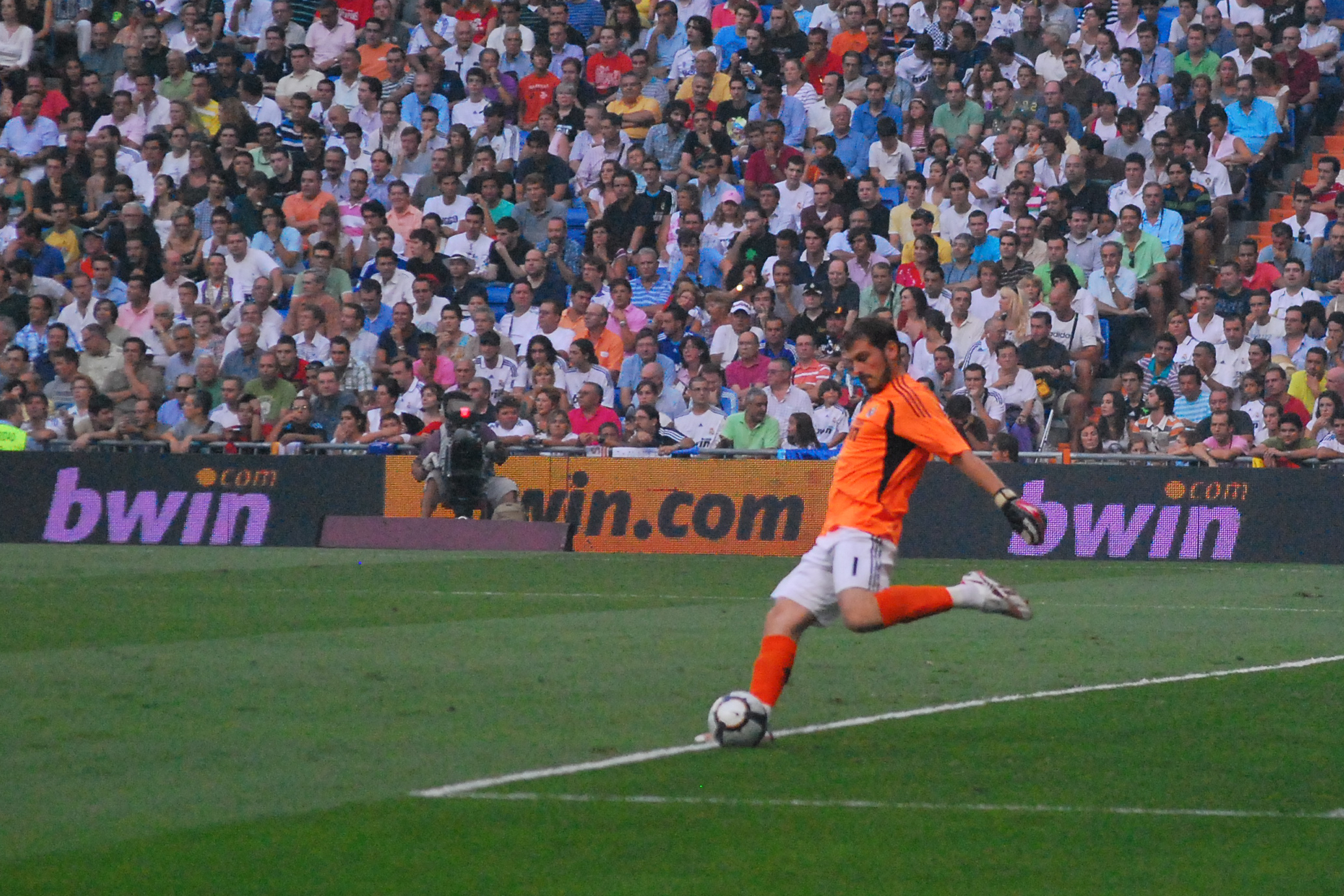
Casillas in action for Real Madrid at the Santiago Bernabéu in 2009

The 2007–08 season was a fruitful season for Casillas, as he helped Real Madrid reclaim their 31st La Liga title and conceded only 32 goals in 36 matches to claim the Zamora Trophy. On 14 February 2008, he and club captain Raúl were awarded contracts for life; Casillas signed a contract extension that would keep him at the club until 2017, with an automatic extension if he played 30 competitive matches during the final season of the contract and a buy-out clause of £113 million. His performances earned him a spot in the UEFA Team of the Year for the second time.

In February 2009, Casillas equalled Paco Buyo's record of 454 matches played for a goalkeeper and has since surpassed it to become Real Madrid's most-capped goalkeeper of all time at only 27 years old. During the 2009 summer transfer window, some Spanish media reported that Manchester City had launched a record £129 million bid for the goalkeeper. The club denied the rumours, however, saying that no such offer had been made. Manchester United had been rumoured to have enquired about him, but no price was announced. He had been linked with other Premier League clubs before but Casillas himself stated that he "had no intention of leaving" his boyhood club.

During the 2009–10 season on 4 October in a game against Sevilla, Casillas made an extraordinary save, running from one side of his goal to the other to deny Diego Perotti in a one-on-one, close-range encounter. After the match, he received praise from fellow Spanish goalkeepers and England goalkeeper Gordon Banks, who stated, "Casillas' reflexes are incredible. If he continues to play this well he will become one of the best goalkeepers in the history of the game." Europa Press reported that Casillas was the second-most popular Spanish sportsman on the Internet in 2010. The study performed by company Vipnet360 examined the web presence on platforms like Facebook, Twitter and YouTube.

==== 2010–2015 ====
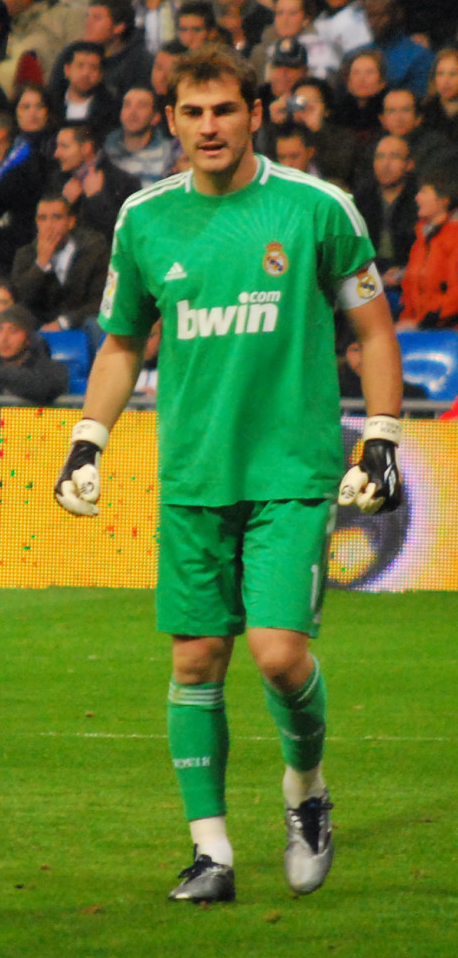
Casillas, wearing the captain's armband while playing for Real Madrid in 2010

During the 2010–11 season, after the departure of first and second captains of Real Madrid, Raúl and Guti respectively, Casillas was selected as first captain with new vice-captains Sergio Ramos, Marcelo and Gonzalo Higuaín.

During the 2011–12 season, Casillas won the IFFHS Best Goalkeeper award, making him only the second goalkeeper behind Gianluigi Buffon to win it four times and the only goalkeeper to win the award four times in a row. Casillas played his 600th match for Real Madrid on 22 January 2012 in a 4–1 win against Athletic Bilbao. On 2 May 2012, Casillas clinched his fifth La Liga title and his first as a captain of Real Madrid, with a 3–0 win in Bilbao.

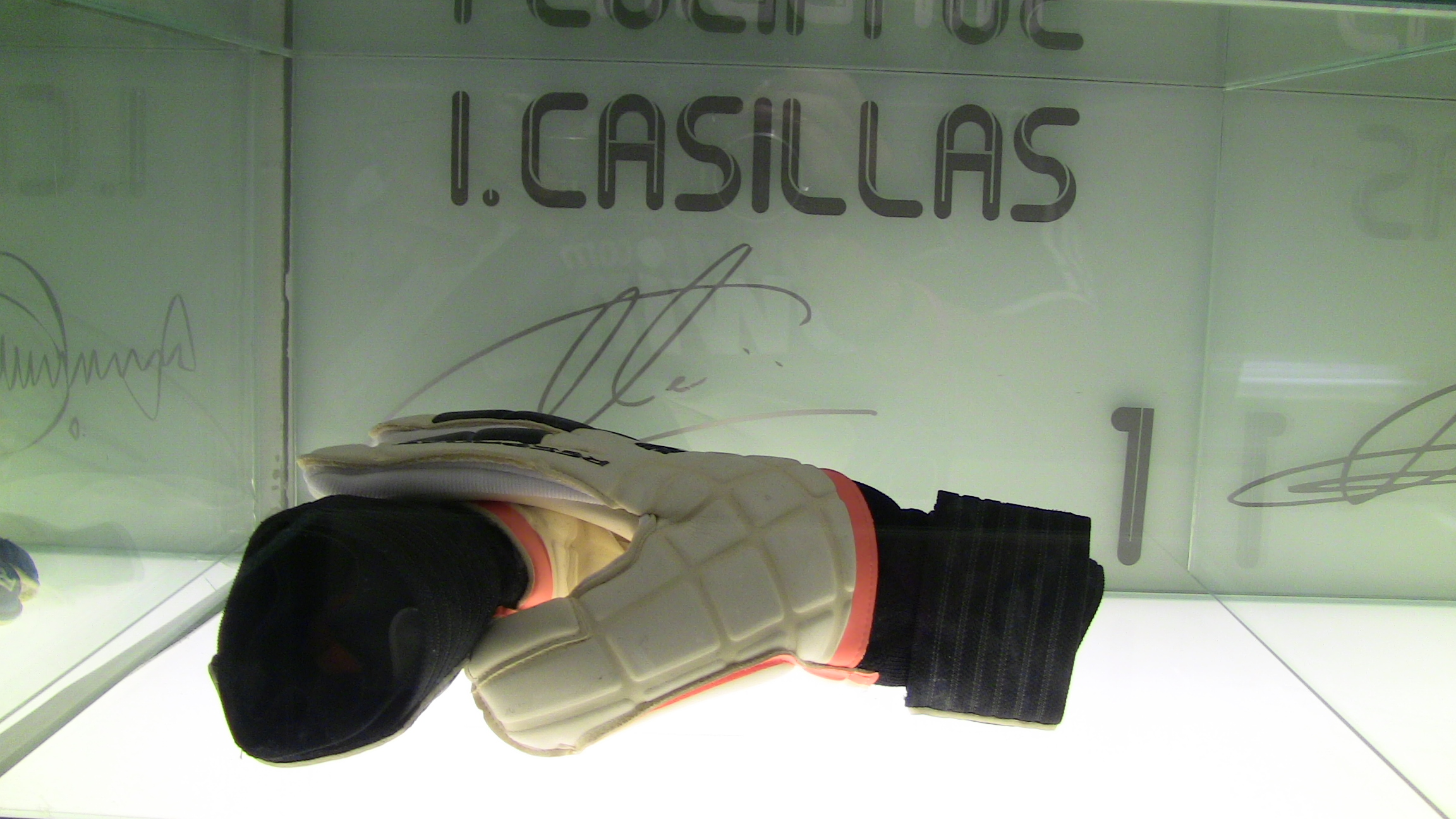
Casillas's gloves on display at the Santiago Bernabeu museum

On 22 December 2012, Casillas was dropped by José Mourinho for a Liga match against Málaga in favour of Antonio Adán. This was the beginning of a series of sour disagreements between the Portuguese coach and the player, some of which, along with other internal affairs, were allegedly aired to the press by Casillas himself. This generated a shift in the opinion of certain sectors of Real Madrid's fans, who gave Casillas the nickname "topor" (a portmanteau of "topo", and "portero", Spanish for "mole" and "goalkeeper", respectively). During the 2012–13 season, Casillas won the IFFHS Best Goalkeeper Award for the fifth consecutive time, making him the only goalkeeper in history to have ever won that award five times (in a row).

In January 2013, after a serious injury to Casillas, Mourinho signed Diego López from Sevilla. López was named first-choice goalkeeper ahead of Adán and kept his place in the team even after Casillas had returned from injury. After the 2012–13 season, Mourinho left Madrid and soon after his departure, Spanish midfielder Andrés Iniesta criticised him for benching Casillas.

In the middle of 2013, it was announced that Carlo Ancelotti would be Real Madrid's head coach for the 2013–14 season. Real Madrid started the season with a 2–1 victory over Real Betis in which Casillas was benched once again. He made his first start in 238 days in the Champions League group stage match against Galatasaray, but was injured in the 14th minute after Sergio Ramos caught him with an accidental elbow as the goalkeeper came from his line to make a routine catch. Despite being the club's second-choice keeper in La Liga, behind Diego López, Casillas continued to be Madrid's first choice keeper in the Champions League and Copa del Rey, setting a new record of 962 minutes without conceding a goal in the latter competition. In February 2014, he became the first goalkeeper to play in every round of the Copa del Rey prior to the final without conceding a goal. On 16 April, he captained Madrid in the final as they beat rivals Barcelona 2–1 at Valencia's Mestalla Stadium. On 24 May 2014, Casillas captained Real Madrid in the 2014 Champions League final, winning the title for the third time in his career with a 4–1 win over Atlético Madrid in Lisbon; this was the tenth time Real Madrid had won the trophy. Although Diego Godín's opening goal resulted from an error by Casillas, Sergio Ramos tied the match for Real Madrid in injury time; the club went on to win the title in extra-time. In 2013–14 season Casillas kept 6 clean sheets, third most in a single season of Champions League.

Following the Champions League win, the 2014–15 season saw Casillas return to being the club's first choice goalkeeper, despite competition from new arrival Keylor Navas, as he then went on to win the UEFA Super Cup, with Real Madrid defeating Sevilla 2–0 on 12 August 2014. He then also won the FIFA Club World Cup later that year, making his 700th appearance for Madrid on 20 December 2014, in the 2014 FIFA Club World Cup Final, as Real Madrid defeated San Lorenzo 2–0. In May 2015, Casillas played in the Champions League semi-finals against Juventus, in which his team lost 3–2 on aggregate.

=== Porto ===
==== 2015–2019 ====
"You've always been a Real Madrid icon, but above all you've been one of the best representatives of our position on the pitch. Good luck in your new adventure, it'll be strange to see you in another shirt from now on. Go Iker!"

— Juventus and Italy goalkeeper Gianluigi Buffon on Casillas following his transfer to Porto in July 2015.

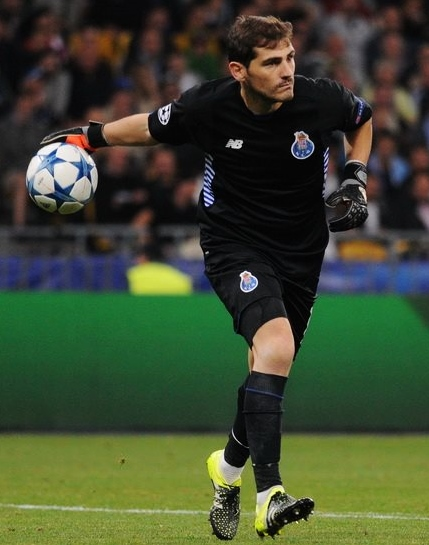
Casillas playing for Porto in 2015

After much speculation about his future, on 11 July 2015 Casillas signed with Portuguese Primeira Liga side Porto on a two-year deal with the option of a one-year extension. Real Madrid's conduct in his exit was criticised, with Casillas's parents claiming that he was being forced out of the club by president Florentino Pérez, who received calls to quit from fans. Former international teammate Xavi, who earlier that summer left Barcelona after a similarly long and successful career, claimed that Real Madrid were ungrateful of Casillas's service to the club.

Casillas made his Primeira Liga debut on 15 August, keeping a clean sheet in a 3–0 win over Vitória de Guimarães at the Estádio do Dragão. On 29 September 2015, he overtook Xavi to become the player with the most appearances in the Champions League, making his record 152nd Champions League appearance in a 2–1 home win over Chelsea. That season, Casillas also broke Edwin van der Sar's record for the most clean sheets in Champions League history, keeping his 51st clean sheet in the competition on 20 October 2015, in a 2–0 win over Maccabi Tel Aviv, as his team climbed top of Champions League Group G. In January 2016, he was blamed for the away loss at Vitória de Guimarães (1–0) in the league, following a high-profile error.

On 11 March 2017, Casillas set a new personal record for clean sheets in a single season with his sixteenth clean sheet in a 4–0 away win over Arouca. On 14 March, Casillas made his 175th appearance in UEFA club competitions in a 1–0 away defeat to Juventus in the second leg of the round of 16 of the UEFA Champions League, overtaking Paolo Maldini as the player with the most appearances in European club matches.

On 13 September, Casillas equalled Ryan Giggs's record of playing in 19 consecutive UEFA Champions League campaigns when he appeared in Porto's 3–1 home defeat to Beşiktaş in the 2017–18 edition of the tournament. On 2 April 2018, Casillas played his 1,000th match as a professional in Porto's 2–0 loss at Belenenses. In May, he won his first trophy with the club as they won the league title for the first time since 2013. The 2017–18 Primeira Liga title was confirmed after Sporting CP and Benfica tied their respective match. On 17 May 2018, he renewed his contract with Porto for another year.

On 4 August, Casillas started in Porto's 3–1 victory over Desportivo das Aves in the 2018 Supertaça Cândido de Oliveira. He surpassed Giggs's record during the 2018–19 season, appearing in his 20th consecutive UEFA Champions League campaign. On 11 December, Casillas, in a 3–2 away win over Galatasaray, became the first player to reach the knock-out stage 19 times, and become only the second player after Cristiano Ronaldo to win 100 Champions League matches. He made 31 league appearances throughout the season as Porto finished in second place, but his season was cut short after he suffered "an acute myocardial infarction" during training on 1 May 2019. He was discharged from hospital on 6 May, but commented that he was uncertain about his future.

==== 2019–2020 ====
In July 2019, following his heart attack two months earlier, Casillas returned for pre-season training. Later that month, Porto announced that he had been given a role with the club's coaching staff as he continued his recovery. In August, he was named in Porto's squad for the 2019–20 season. In September, he shared the results of his medical tests on social media; at the end of the month, he stated that he would wait until March of the following year to see how he is progressing with his recovery before deciding whether to return to playing or retire. In October, he posted a photo of himself working out in the club's gym on Instagram. He resumed training on 4 November.

==== Retirement ====
On 4 August 2020, Casillas officially announced his retirement from professional football. In July, he was reported to have returned to Real Madrid to work as an advisor for Florentino Pérez. In December 2020, he was appointed as the deputy to the Real Madrid Foundation CEO.

== International career ==
=== Youth career ===
Casillas debuted for Spain at the under-17 level. At age 16, he was the youngest player in the Spanish squad that placed third at the 1997 FIFA U-17 World Championship in Egypt. He was later made captain of the U17s. Two years later, he went on to win the FIFA World Youth Championship and the UEFA–CAF Meridian Cup that same year. Initially second-choice, he soon worked his way up to first-choice and eventually earned his first senior cap following some brilliant performances at club level.

=== Senior debut, Euro 2000 and 2002 World Cup ===
Casillas is currently the second most capped player in the history of the Spain national team. Following his full international debut at the senior level on 3 June 2000 against Sweden (at 19 years and 14 days), Casillas was an unused substitute at UEFA Euro 2000. He was part of the roster for the 2002 FIFA World Cup, initially as the understudy to Santiago Cañizares. Coincidentally, he became first-choice when Cañizares had to withdraw from the tournament due to injury from a freak accident. At 21, Casillas was one of the youngest first-choice goalkeepers in the tournament. He played an instrumental role in Spanish progression when he saved a penalty in regulation time and two more in the 3–2 shoot-out victory during the round of 16 match against the Republic of Ireland (1–1 after 120 minutes), earning him the nickname "The Saint". One of his saves during the quarter-final against co-hosts South Korea during the 2002 World Cup was rated by FIFA as one of the top ten saves of all time; however, Spain were eliminated following a 5–3 penalty shoot-out defeat to the Koreans (0–0 after 120 minutes).

=== Euro 2004 and 2006 World Cup ===
Casillas played in all eight Group six fixtures during Euro 2004 qualifying, conceding just four goals. He kept a clean sheet in the second leg victory of the playoff against Norway which ended 3–0 in Oslo, and started all of Spain's Euro 2004 matches. He was the first choice for the 2006 World Cup, captaining the team twice, but could not prevent La Roja from losing 3–1 to a Zinedine Zidane-inspired France in the Round of 16.

=== Euro 2008 ===
With the exclusion of his Real Madrid teammate Raúl from the squad for Euro 2008, Casillas was given the captain's armband. He started the first two Group D games against Russia and Sweden before being rested in place of second-choice goalkeeper Pepe Reina for Spain's group stage elimination of Greece. Casillas saved two penalties from Antonio Di Natale and Daniele De Rossi as Spain eliminated Italy in the quarter-finals with a 4–2 shootout win following a goalless draw on 22 June. Spain later went on to win the competition with a 1–0 win over Germany in the final on 29 June. Casillas kept clean sheets in all of the quarter-final, semi-final and final matches, with Sweden's first round goal by Zlatan Ibrahimović being the last one scored against him. On 29 June 2008, Casillas became the first goalkeeper-captain to lift the UEFA European Championship trophy when Spain beat Germany in the final.

In October 2008, Casillas and back-up Pepe Reina broke the national record for the longest time spent without conceding a goal. The pair went unbeaten for 710 minutes, longer than Spain's longest-serving goalkeeper Andoni Zubizarreta and Paco Buyo. Wesley Sonck of Belgium ended their goalless streak when he scored against them a 2010 World Cup qualifying match.

Casillas was the highest-ranked goalkeeper (fourth place) in the 2008 Ballon d'Or, behind Cristiano Ronaldo, Lionel Messi and national teammate Fernando Torres. Also in 2008, Casillas was named the world's best goalkeeper by the International Federation of Football History & Statistics (IFFHS). He also came in third place in the best goalkeepers of all time ranking, beating Oliver Kahn.

=== 2009 Confederations Cup and 2010 World Cup ===
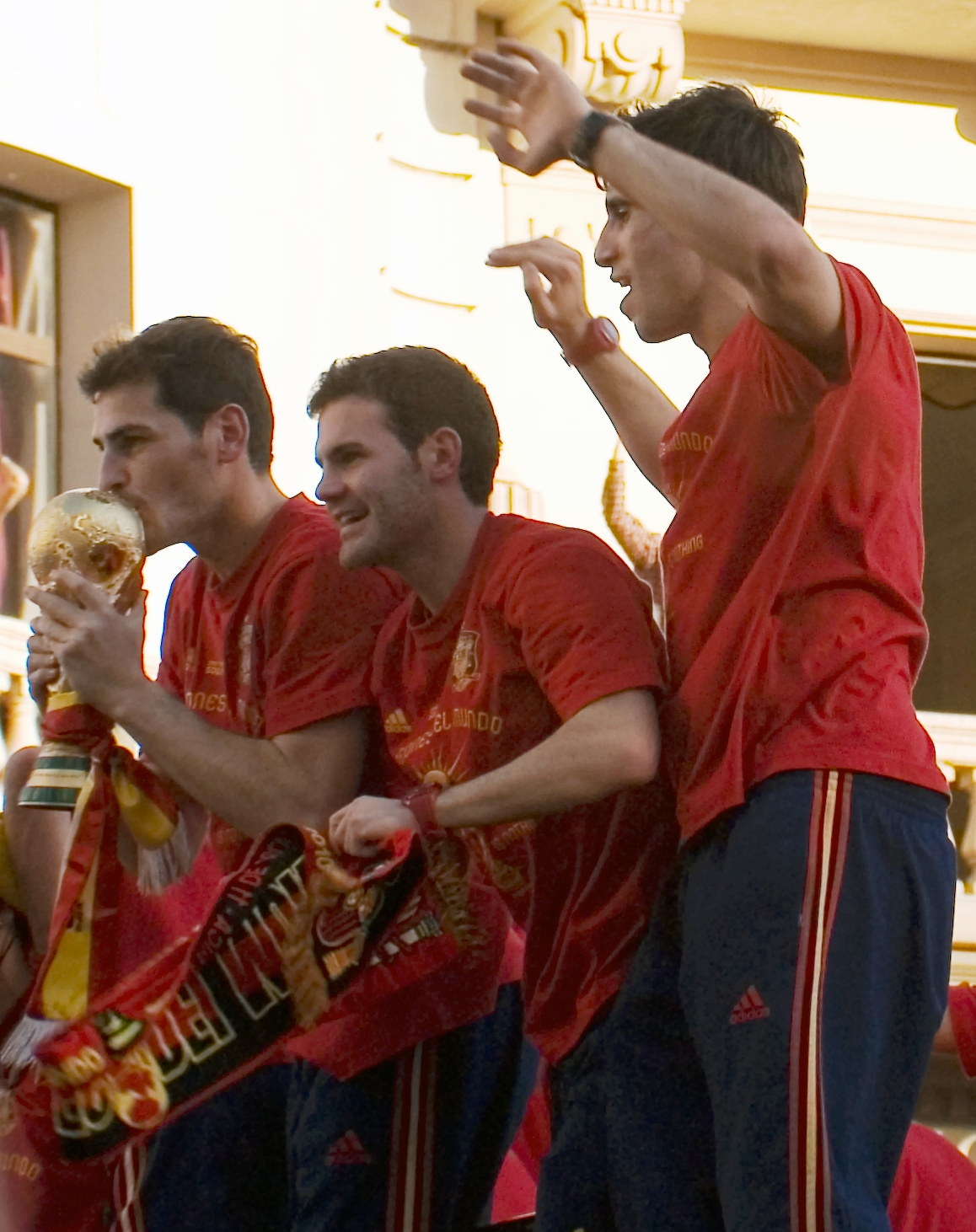
Casillas with the World Cup trophy during celebrations in Spain, July 2010

Casillas was Spain's starting goalkeeper during the 2009 FIFA Confederations Cup in South Africa, making four appearances as Spain finished the tournament in third place. On 5 September 2009, after a 5–0 win over Belgium in a qualifying match for the World Cup, Casillas equalled Andoni Zubizarreta's national record of 56 clean sheets, and during the team's next match, against Estonia on 9 September 2009, he surpassed Zubizarreta as the record holder for the most Spanish international clean sheets (this being achieved in Casillas's 98th appearance for the national team, while Zubizarreta made 126 before his retirement). Two months later, Casillas made his 100th appearance for Spain in its friendly win over Argentina, making him only the third player in history of Spanish football to ever reach this far internationally.

Although Casillas committed an error which led to a goal in Spain's 1–0 defeat to Switzerland in their opening match of the 2010 FIFA World Cup, on 11 July 2010, Casillas captained Spain to their first ever World Cup title with a 1–0 win against the Netherlands in extra-time. In so doing, he became the third ever goalkeeper to captain a World Cup winning side (along with Gianpiero Combi in 1934 and Dino Zoff in 1982; the feat was later also achieved by Hugo Lloris in 2018). He was voted the tournament's best goalkeeper, being named to the 2010 World Cup Dream Team, and was also awarded the Golden Glove. In the course of the finals in South Africa, he kept a joint–record five clean sheets – including in all four games in the knock-out stages –, only conceded a joint–record two goals, and saved a penalty in regulation time in the quarter-final victory against Paraguay. In the final, he made two crucial stops from Netherlands' Arjen Robben with the score at 0–0 after the Dutchman had passed all the defenders. Before he went to pick up the World Cup trophy, Casillas would later state that images of the past captains doing the same was in his head, reeling them off in perfect order going back to the first World Cup he saw as a youngster:

From when I was small, I saw Matthäus lift it. I saw Dunga lift it, I saw Deschamps lift it, I saw Cafu lift it, Cannavaro... so to watch me lift it, I could watch it tomorrow, I could watch it within 10 years and it will always make me emotional because it's incomparable.

On 15 November 2011, Casillas became Spain's most capped player, breaking Andoni Zubizarreta's record after starting for Spain in their 2–2 draw against Costa Rica. On 29 February 2012, in Spain's 5–0 win over Venezuela, Casillas equalled Edwin van der Sar's record of 72 international clean sheets. On 30 May, in Spain's 4–1 win over South Korea, Casillas came on for Pepe Reina on the 82nd minute mark. This set the record for most international victories with 95 giving Casillas yet another record to his name. On 6 June, In Spain's 1–0 win over China PR, Casillas set the record for most international clean sheets with 74.

=== Euro 2012 ===
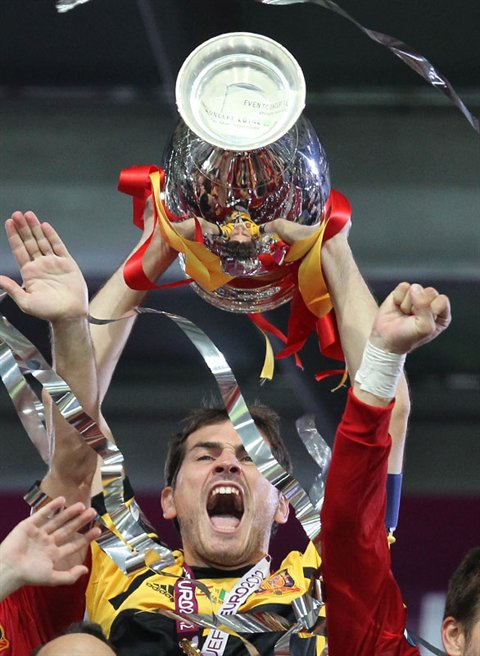
Casillas lifting the Euro 2012 trophy, the third consecutive major title for Spain, achieving a historic treble

Prior to Euro 2012, there had been growing tensions in the dressing room among Spain's players who played for rival clubs Barcelona and Real Madrid; this led manager Vicente del Bosque to declare that any player who carried this hostility with them at international level would be dropped from the team. As such, Casillas, Carles Puyol, and Xavi called a summit with the manager and the team's players, in order to ease tensions; Casillas was praised in the media for his role in successfully uniting the dressing room. On 1 July 2012, Casillas became the first player to reach 100 international wins for his country as Spain defeated Italy 4–0 in the Euro 2012 final, as Spain successfully defended their title to win their third consecutive major international trophy. He also set another record with his 509 minutes without conceding a goal in that year's European Championship, keeping five consecutive clean sheets and breaking the longstanding tally of 494 minutes set by Italian goalkeeper Dino Zoff. The only goal he conceded, scored by Antonio Di Natale, came in Spain's opening match of the tournament, a 1–1 draw against eventual runners-up Italy. Casillas then continued his new record unbeaten streak with Spain to 817 minutes, until it was finally broken by Olivier Giroud's injury-time goal on 16 October of that year, which came in a 1–1 home draw against France in a 2014 World Cup qualifying match.

=== 2013 Confederations Cup and 2014 World Cup ===
In June 2013, Casillas represented Spain at the 2013 Confederations Cup in Brazil, making three appearances as Spain reached the final, only to be defeated 3–0 by the hosts Brazil on 30 June, at the Maracanã Stadium.

In June 2014, Casillas was selected to represent Spain in his fourth World Cup. In the team's opening match, he made two mistakes leading to goals from Stefan de Vrij and Robin van Persie as the champions were defeated 5–1 by the Netherlands. After the match, Casillas apologised for the defeat and called his performance the worst of his career. He also started in Spain's second group game against Chile, which they lost 2–0 and were subsequently eliminated from the World Cup. He received criticism for his role in Chile's second goal, where he punched Alexis Sánchez's free kick into the path of the goalscorer Charles Aránguiz. On 23 June, Casillas was left on the bench for Spain's final game against Australia, with Pepe Reina playing instead.

=== Euro 2016 ===
On 5 September 2015, Casillas kept a clean sheet in his 100th game as Spain's captain, a 2–0 Euro 2016 qualifying win over Slovakia at the Estadio Carlos Tartiere in Oviedo. On 13 November, Casillas kept his 100th international clean sheet with Spain in a 2–0 friendly win over England, in Alicante, becoming the first goalkeeper ever – male or female – to reach this landmark. He equalled the Latvian Vitālijs Astafjevs's European record of 166 caps on 27 March 2016 by playing in a friendly against Romania.

On 31 May, Casillas was named to Vicente del Bosque's final 23-man Spain squad for Euro 2016. The following day, he became the most-capped European player by earning his 167th cap in a 6–1 friendly win over South Korea in Salzburg in a pre-tournament warm-up match; he was later replaced by debutant Sergio Rico in the second half. This was his final international appearance. During the tournament, he was the second-choice goalkeeper behind David de Gea; Casillas did not make an appearance during the tournament as Spain was eliminated in the Round of 16 following a 2–0 defeat to Italy.

=== 2018 World Cup ===
On 21 May 2018, Casillas was left out of Julen Lopetegui's final 23-man Spain squad for the 2018 FIFA World Cup in Russia. In November, he hinted a return to the Spain football team and Real Madrid.

== Style of play and recognition ==
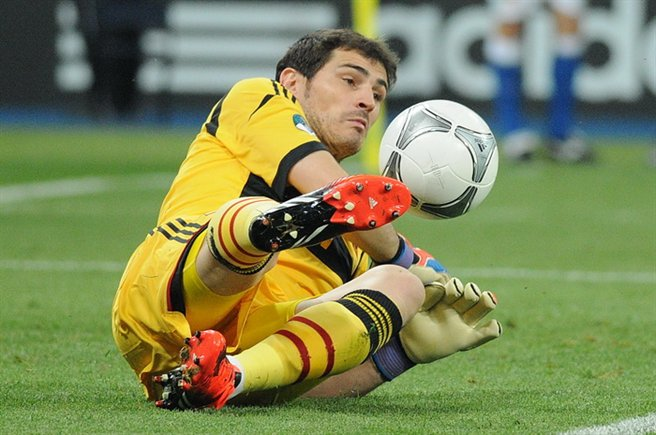
Casillas making a save in the UEFA Euro 2012 final

Honestly, I don't have to use up many words to say how good he is, the results are there for all to see. He has won everything there is to win and has been on the same great level for so many years now, which is possibly hardest of all for a goalkeeper. Spain almost never concede goals and Casillas is the main reason for that.

— Juventus and Italy goalkeeper Gianluigi Buffon on Casillas prior to the UEFA Euro 2012 Final.

Widely considered by pundits, as well as both former and current goalkeeping colleagues, as one of the greatest goalkeepers of all time, Casillas was given the nickname "San Iker" ("Saint Iker") throughout his career, for his precocious performances as a youngster, and due to his ability to produce acrobatic and decisive saves. In his prime, he was a spectacular, well-rounded, and athletic keeper, who was known in particular for his outstanding agility, reflexes, consistency and shot-stopping, as well as his foot-work, positioning between the posts, concentration, and speed when rushing off his line in one on one situations; he has also stood out for his penalty-saving abilities.

In spite of his reserved character, he has been highly regarded for his strong personality, calm composure under pressure, ability to organise his defence, and leadership from the back throughout his career, as well as his reading of the game. Gianluigi Buffon described Casillas as the best goalkeeper of his era with his hands. He was also known for his ability to save the ball with his feet, with former goalkeeper Manuel Almunia likening him to compatriot Luis Arconada, who also served as an inspiration to Casillas, and to whom he was often compared throughout his career, due to his quick reactions, movement, and excellent footwork. Regarding Casillas's playing style and goalkeeping ability, Almunia commented in 2017: "Iker's a strong goalkeeper, leaps well, good diving in either direction... between the posts he moves like a cat." In 2016, Casillas was named the fourth greatest goalkeeper in history by France Football.

A precocious talent in his youth, Casillas has drawn praise for his longevity and consistency at the top level, as well as his discipline in training; despite his reputation and goalkeeping ability, however, due to his lack of notable height and strong physical attributes, he has been criticised at times by pundits for struggling to command his area, in particular against aerial threats, and for his unsteady handling and indecisiveness when coming out to claim crosses, as he often preferred to punch the ball away. He also received criticism in the media for a series of errors and less consistent performances in his later career, as he lost some of his speed and mobility with age due to his physical decline. Although he has occasionally been criticised by pundits for his limited skills with the ball at his feet in comparison to other Spanish goalkeepers, Casillas's distribution with both his hands and feet has generally been reliable throughout his career, and he is capable of sending the ball into deep areas of the pitch with his long throws and kicks with his left foot.

== Sponsorship ==
In January 2012, Casillas agreed a sponsorship deal with Adidas to wear their Response goalkeeping gloves and Predator football boots. The move to Adidas ended a long running association for Casillas with Reebok, which started in 2004. In February 2005, Casillas was the football face of Reebok's "I Am What I Am" global integrated advertising campaign that linked all the brand's marketing efforts under one umbrella. Adidas has been the parent company of Reebok since 2005.

== Outside football ==
=== Personal life ===
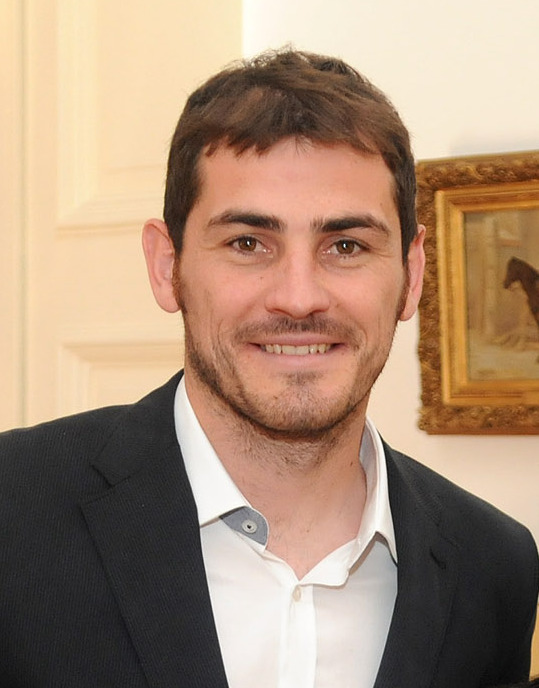
Casillas in 2011

Between 2004 and 2008, Casillas dated beauty pageant winner Eva González. Casillas was in a relationship with sports journalist Sara Carbonero from 2009 to 2021. Their first son Martín was born on 3 January 2014 in Madrid. In November 2015, the couple announced they were expecting their second child. On 20 March 2016, the couple married. On June 2, 2016, their second son Lucas was born. On 1 May 2019, during Porto's morning training session, Casillas was rushed to hospital after suffering a heart attack at the club's training ground, where his situation was stabilized. Later that evening, Casillas, whose situation had improved, published a statement on Twitter with a picture of himself giving the thumbs up signal in which he thanked the people for the moral support they gave him. Later that month, it was announced that his wife was suffering from cancer.

On 12 March 2021, Casillas and Carbonero announced their decision to separate. In 2013, a street in the Móstoles municipality of Madrid was renamed Avenida de Iker Casillas in his honour. On 17 February 2020, Casillas confirmed his intention to stand as a candidate in the RFEF presidential elections.

=== Charity ===
In 2011, Casillas was appointed as a Goodwill Ambassador for the United Nations Development Programme's Millennium Development Goals.

He has his own charitable foundation, the Fundación Iker Casillas.

In 2018, he attended the international social Football for Friendship forum in Moscow.

== Career statistics ==
=== Club ===
Appearances and goals by club, season and competition
| Club | Season | League | | | National Cup (Note: Includes Copa del Rey, Taça de Portugal and Taça da Liga) | | Continental | | Other | | Total | |
| Club | Season | Division | Apps | Goals | Apps | Goals | Apps | Goals | Apps | Goals | Apps | Goals |
|---|---|---|---|---|---|---|---|---|---|---|---|---|
| Real Madrid C | 1998–99 | Tercera División | 27 | 0 | — | | — | | 6 (Note: Appearance(s) in Tercera División Playoffs) | 0 | 33 | 0 |
| Real Madrid B | 1999–2000 | Segunda División B | 4 | 0 | — | | — | | — | | 4 | 0 |
| Real Madrid | 1999–2000 | La Liga | 27 | 0 | 5 | 0 | 12 (Note: Appearance(s) in UEFA Champions League) | 0 | 3 (Note: Appearance(s) in FIFA Club World Championship) | 0 | 47 | 0 |
| Real Madrid | 2000–01 | La Liga | 34 | 0 | 0 | 0 | 11 | 0 | 2 (Note: One appearance in UEFA Super Cup and one appearance in Intercontinental Cup) | 0 | 47 | 0 |
| Real Madrid | 2001–02 | La Liga | 25 | 0 | 5 | 0 | 9 | 0 | 1 (Note: Appearance(s) in Supercopa de España) | 0 | 40 | 0 |
| Real Madrid | 2002–03 | La Liga | 38 | 0 | 0 | 0 | 15 | 0 | 2 | 0 | 55 | 0 |
| Real Madrid | 2003–04 | La Liga | 37 | 0 | 2 | 0 | 9 | 0 | 2 | 0 | 50 | 0 |
| Real Madrid | 2004–05 | La Liga | 37 | 0 | 0 | 0 | 10 (Note: Appearances in UEFA Champions League (includes two appearances in qualifying rounds)) | 0 | — | | 47 | 0 |
| Real Madrid | 2005–06 | La Liga | 37 | 0 | 4 | 0 | 7 | 0 | — | | 48 | 0 |
| Real Madrid | 2006–07 | La Liga | 38 | 0 | 0 | 0 | 7 | 0 | — | | 45 | 0 |
| Real Madrid | 2007–08 | La Liga | 36 | 0 | 0 | 0 | 8 | 0 | 2 | 0 | 46 | 0 |
| Real Madrid | 2008–09 | La Liga | 38 | 0 | 0 | 0 | 7 | 0 | 2 | 0 | 47 | 0 |
| Real Madrid | 2009–10 | La Liga | 38 | 0 | 0 | 0 | 8 | 0 | — | | 46 | 0 |
| Real Madrid | 2010–11 | La Liga | 35 | 0 | 8 | 0 | 11 | 0 | — | | 54 | 0 |
| Real Madrid | 2011–12 | La Liga | 37 | 0 | 4 | 0 | 10 | 0 | 2 | 0 | 53 | 0 |
| Real Madrid | 2012–13 | La Liga | 19 | 0 | 3 | 0 | 5 | 0 | 2 | 0 | 29 | 0 |
| Real Madrid | 2013–14 | La Liga | 2 | 0 | 9 | 0 | 13 | 0 | — | | 24 | 0 |
| Real Madrid | 2014–15 | La Liga | 32 | 0 | 0 | 0 | 10 | 0 | 5 (Note: Two appearances in Supercopa de España, one appearance in UEFA Super Cup and two appearances in FIFA Club World Cup) | 0 | 47 | 0 |
| Real Madrid | Total | | 510 | 0 | 40 | 0 | 152 | 0 | 23 | 0 | 725 | 0 |
| Porto | 2015–16 | Primeira Liga | 32 | 0 | 0 | 0 | 8 (Note: Six appearances in UEFA Champions League and two appearances in UEFA Europa League) | 0 | — | | 40 | 0 |
| Porto | 2016–17 | Primeira Liga | 33 | 0 | 0 | 0 | 10 (Note: Appearances in UEFA Champions League (includes two appearances in qualifying rounds)) | 0 | — | | 43 | 0 |
| Porto | 2017–18 | Primeira Liga | 20 | 0 | 8 (Note: Five appearances in Taça de Portugal and three appearances in Taça da Liga) | 0 | 3 | 0 | — | | 31 | 0 |
| Porto | 2018–19 | Primeira Liga | 31 | 0 | 0 | 0 | 10 | 0 | 1 (Note: Appearance in Supertaça Cândido de Oliveira) | 0 | 42 | 0 |
| Porto | 2019–20 | Primeira Liga | 0 | 0 | 0 | 0 | 0 | 0 | 0 | 0 | 0 | 0 |
| Porto | Total | | 116 | 0 | 8 | 0 | 31 | 0 | 1 | 0 | 156 | 0 |
| Career total | | | 657 | 0 | 48 | 0 | 183 | 0 | 30 | 0 | 918 | 0 |

=== International ===
Appearances and goals by national team and year
| National team | Year | Apps | Goals |
|---|---|---|---|
| Spain | 2000 | 6 | 0 |
| Spain | 2001 | 5 | 0 |
| Spain | 2002 | 11 | 0 |
| Spain | 2003 | 11 | 0 |
| Spain | 2004 | 12 | 0 |
| Spain | 2005 | 10 | 0 |
| Spain | 2006 | 10 | 0 |
| Spain | 2007 | 8 | 0 |
| Spain | 2008 | 15 | 0 |
| Spain | 2009 | 13 | 0 |
| Spain | 2010 | 15 | 0 |
| Spain | 2011 | 11 | 0 |
| Spain | 2012 | 16 | 0 |
| Spain | 2013 | 9 | 0 |
| Spain | 2014 | 8 | 0 |
| Spain | 2015 | 5 | 0 |
| Spain | 2016 | 2 | 0 |
| Total | | 167 | 0 |

== Honours ==
Real Madrid C

- Tercera División: 1998–99 (Group VII)

Real Madrid

- La Liga: 2000–01, 2002–03, 2006–07, 2007–08, 2011–12
- Copa del Rey: 2010–11, 2013–14
- Supercopa de España: 2001, 2003, 2008, 2012
- UEFA Champions League: 1999–2000, 2001–02, 2013–14
- UEFA Super Cup: 2002, 2014
- FIFA Club World Cup: 2014
- Intercontinental Cup: 2002

Porto

- Primeira Liga: 2017–18
- Supertaça Cândido de Oliveira: 2018

Spain Youth

- UEFA European U-16 Championship: 1997
- UEFA–CAF Meridian Cup: 1999
- FIFA World Youth Championship: 1999

Spain

- FIFA World Cup: 2010
- UEFA European Championship: 2008, 2012

Individual

- Bravo Award: 2000
- La Liga Breakthrough Player of the Year: 2000
- La Liga Zamora Trophy: 2007–08
- La Liga Best Goalkeeper: 2009, 2012
- La Liga Fair Play Award: 2012–13
- Primeira Liga Fair Play Award: 2017–18
- MARCA Fair Play Award – MARCA's 80th Anniversary: 2018
- Dragões de Ouro Award – Porto Athlete of the Year: 2018
- Primeira Liga Best Goalkeeper: 2018–19
- Primeira Liga Team of the Year: 2018–19
- Quinas de Ouro Award – Primeira Liga Best XI: 2018–19
- Best European Goalkeeper: 2010
- IFFHS World's Best Goalkeeper: 2008, 2009, 2010, 2011, 2012
- IFFHS Best Goalkeeper of the Decade 2001–2010: 2nd
- IFFHS Best Goalkeeper of the Past 25 Years 1987–2012: 2nd
- FIFA FIFPro World XI: 2008, 2009, 2010, 2011, 2012
- FIFA World Cup Golden Glove: 2010
- FIFA World Cup Dream Team: 2010
- UEFA Euro Team of the Tournament: 2008, 2012
- UEFA Team of the Year: 2007, 2008, 2009, 2010, 2011, 2012
- ESM Team of the Year: 2008
- UEFA Ultimate Team of the Year (published 2019)
- Golden Foot: 2017
- World XI: Team of the 21st Century
- Globe Soccer Awards – Player Career Award: 2020
- 11Leyendas Jornal AS: 2021

Records

- Second-most appearances in the UEFA Champions League: 177 (behind Cristiano Ronaldo) (excluding 4 appearances in the qualifying rounds)
- Second-most clean sheets in the UEFA Champions League: 57 (excluding 2 in the qualifying rounds) (behind Manuel Neuer)
- Third-most victories in the UEFA Champions League: 101 (behind Cristiano Ronaldo and Thomas Müller)
- Most consecutive seasons in the UEFA Champions League: 20
- First player in UEFA Champions League history to reach the knockout phase 19 times
- First goalkeeper to win 100 UEFA Champions League matches
- Youngest goalkeeper to play in a UEFA Champions League final: 19 years and 4 days
- Youngest goalkeeper to win a UEFA Champions League final: 19 years and 4 days
- Second-most UEFA Champions League titles won by a goalkeeper: 3 (behind Juan Alonso) (alongside Ray Clemence, Sepp Maier, Keylor Navas, Heinz Stuy, Víctor Valdés and Kiko Casilla)
- Most appearances for Real Madrid in UEFA club competitions: 155
- Most IFFHS World's Best Goalkeeper Awards: 5 (alongside Gianluigi Buffon and Manuel Neuer)
- Most appearances by a goalkeeper in the FIFPro World XI: 5
- Most appearances by a goalkeeper in the UEFA Team of the Year: 6
- Second-most appearances for the Spain national team: 167 (behind Sergio Ramos)
- Most international clean sheets: 102
- Third-most international victories: 121 (behind Sergio Ramos and Cristiano Ronaldo)
- Most FIFA World Cup tournaments played for Spain: 4 (alongside Xavi, Andoni Zubizarreta, Fernando Hierro, Andrés Iniesta, Sergio Ramos and Sergio Busquets)
- Longest unbeaten run at the UEFA European Championship: 509 minutes
- Most clean sheets at the UEFA European Championship: 9 (alongside Edwin van der Sar)
- Most clean sheets in a single edition of UEFA European Championship: 5 (in 2012, alongside Jordan Pickford in 2020)
- Fewest goals conceded in a single edition of the UEFA European Championship: 1 (in 2012, alongside Gianluigi Buffon, Thomas Myhre, and Dino Zoff)
- Most penalty kicks saved in penalty shoot-outs at the UEFA European Championship: 3 (alongside Gianluigi Buffon)
- Only goalkeeper to stop penalties in two different editions of the FIFA World Cup (excluding shoot-outs): 2002 (vs Ireland), 2010 (vs Paraguay)

Decorations

| Decoration | Year Decorated |
|---|---|
| Gold Medal of the Royal Order of Sporting Merit | 2009 |
| Favourite son of Navalacruz | 2010 |
| Favourite son of Móstoles | 2010 |
| Royal Order of Sports Merit Cross | 2015 |

== See also ==
- List of footballers with 100 or more UEFA Champions League appearances
- List of men's footballers with 100 or more international caps
- List of men's footballers with the most official appearances
- List of Real Madrid CF records and statistics
- List of footballers with 400 or more La Liga appearances

== Notes ==
| Preceded by Haile Gebrselassie; Ethiopia | Prince of Asturias Award for Sports (shared with Xavi); 2012 | Succeeded by José María Olazábal; Spain |
