= Javier Martínez (bishop) =

Spanish prelate

- Archbishop Emeritus of Granada
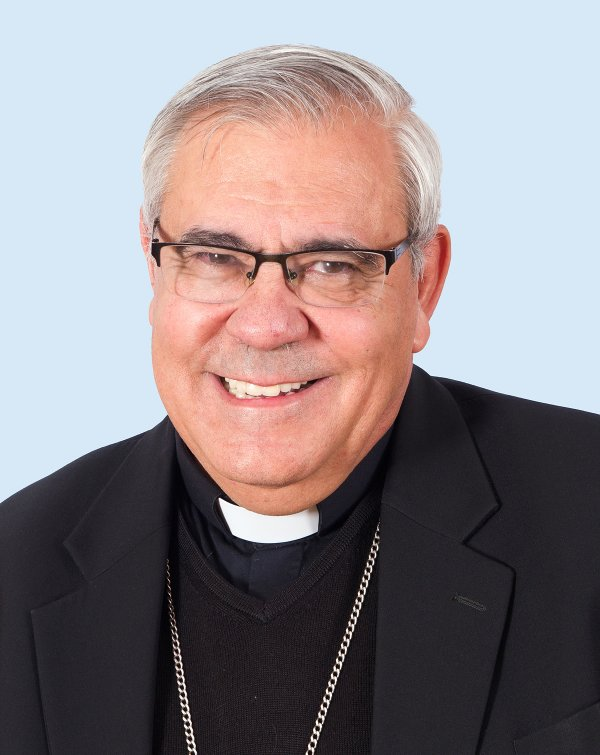
- Church: Catholic Church
- Archdiocese: Archdiocese of Granada
- In office: 15 March 2003 – 1 February 2023
- Predecessor: Antonio Cañizares Llovera
- Successor: José María Gil Tamayo
- Previous posts: Bishop of Córdoba (1996-2003); Titular Bishop of Voli (1985-1996); Auxiliary Bishop of Madrid (1985-1996)

Orders
- Ordination: 3 April 1972
- Consecration: 11 May 1985 by Ángel Suquía Goicoechea

Personal details
- Born: 20 December 1947 (age 78) Madrid, Spanish State

Francisco Javier Martínez Fernández (born 20 December 1947) is a Spanish prelate of the Catholic Church. He was the bishop of Córdoba from 1996 to 2003 and the archbishop of Granada from 2003 to 2023.

== Biography ==
Born in Madrid, Martínez graduated in Biblical theology from the Comillas Pontifical University. He was ordained a priest at the age of 25 on 3 April 1972. He served in the parish of Casarrubuelos in the Community of Madrid. He then joined a seminary in Toledo as a teacher of Christology and introduction to the Bible.

In 1979, Martínez enrolled at the Catholic University of America in Washington, D.C. to study Syriac language and literature, and was assistant to the professor from 1981 to 1983. He obtained a Master of Arts degree and then a doctorate in Semitic languages. In 1984 he returned to Spain to teach patristics and theology at a seminary in Madrid.

Martínez was named Spain's youngest bishop on 11 May 1985, serving as auxiliary bishop of the Archdiocese of Madrid-Alcalá until March 1986. From 15 March 1986 to 15 March 2003 he was the bishop of Córdoba. He was then named archbishop of Granada, succeeding Antonio Cañizares Llovera who had become archbishop of Toledo and primate of all Spain; the succession was effective from 1 June, following Pope John Paul II's visit to Spain.

In December 2007, Martínez became Spain's first archbishop to be taken to court as a defendant in a civil case. In what the judge called a "peculiar and unusual case", he was made to pay €3,750 in damages to the similarly named priest Francisco Javier Martínez Medina for coercion and insults. Martínez Fernández had wanted Martínez Medina to not publish a book on Granada Cathedral that was financed by CajaSur, a bank that Martínez Fernández had been in conflict with.

In the Romanones case in 2014, a man from Granada wrote to Pope Francis about his experience of sexual abuse in the church. Martínez prostrated himself during Mass to ask for forgiveness, and in 2017 was a witness against the alleged abuser, who was acquitted.

In July 2021, Martínez spoke out against Spain's transgender rights bill and euthanasia in the country. He said that the transgender law "turns feelings into a legal category. This isn't the first time that happened. In the 1930s and 40s, the feeling of Aryan supremacy led to millions of deaths when it became law".

After turning 75 years old, Martínez's resignation was accepted and on 1 February 2023 he was succeeded by José María Gil Tamayo.
