= Vicente Casanova y Marzol =

Spanish Cardinal

His Eminence Vicente Casanova y Marzol
- Archbishop of Granada
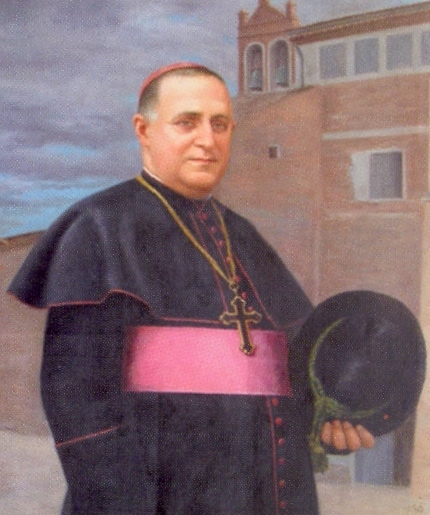
- Portrait.
- Church: Roman Catholic Church
- Archdiocese: Granada
- See: Granada
- Appointed: 7 March 1921
- Term ended: 23 October 1930
- Predecessor: José Meseguer y Costa
- Successor: Agustín Parrado y García
- Other post: Cardinal-Priest of Santi Vitale, Valeria, Gervasio e Protasio (1925-30)
- Previous post: Bishop of Almería (1907-21)

Orders
- Ordination: 1881
- Consecration: 25 March 1908 by Antonio Vico
- Created cardinal: 30 March 1925 by Pope Pius XI
- Rank: Cardinal-Priest

Personal details
- Born: Vicente Casanova y Marzol; 16 April 1854 Borja, Kingdom of Spain
- Died: 23 October 1930 (aged 76) Zaragoza, Spanish Kingdom
- Buried: Granada Cathedral
- Parents: Nicolás Casanova Miguel; Clara Marzol Foncillas
- Motto: Restaurare omnia in Christo ("To restore all things in Christ")
- Coat of arms

Styles of Vicente Casanova y Marzol
- Reference style: His Eminence
- Spoken style: Your Eminence
- Informal style: Cardinal
- See: Granada

Vicente Casanova y Marzol (16 April 1854 – 23 October 1930) was a Spanish Cardinal of the Roman Catholic Church who served as Archbishop of Granada from 1921 until his death, and was elevated to the cardinalate in 1925.

== Biography ==
Vicente Casanova y Marzol was born in Borja, and studied at the seminaries in Zaragoza and in Madrid. He was ordained to the priesthood in 1881, and obtained his licentiate in theology in Valencia in 1882. He then served as a pastor in Maluenda, Alfaro, and for many years in the parish of Nuestra Señora del Buen Consejo in Madrid.

On 19 December 1907 Casanova was appointed Bishop of Almería by Pope Pius X. He received his episcopal consecration on 25 March 1908 from Archbishop Antonio Vico, with Bishops José Salvador y Barrera and Julián de Diego y García Alcolea serving as co-consecrators. Casanova was later named Archbishop of Granada on 7 March 1921.

Pope Pius XI created him Cardinal Priest of Ss. Vitale, Valeria, Gervasio e Protasio in the consistory of 30 March 1925. He was among the clerics who blessed King Alfonso XIII during a ceremony celebrating the twenty-fifth anniversary of his investiture as King of Spain.

The Cardinal died in Zaragoza, at age 76, while he was attending the third National Catechetical Congress. He is buried in the metropolitan cathedral of Granada.

Catholic Church titles
Preceded by Santos Zárate y Martínez	Bishop of Almería; 1907–1921	Succeeded by Bernardo Martínez y Noval, OSA
Preceded by José Meseguer y Costa	Archbishop of Granada; 1921–1930	Succeeded by Agustín Parrado y García
