= Archdiocese of Granada =

Catholic archdiocese in Spain

Coordinates: 37.1766°N 3.5991°W

Archdiocese of Granada Archidioecesis Granatensis Archidiócesis de Granada

Catholic
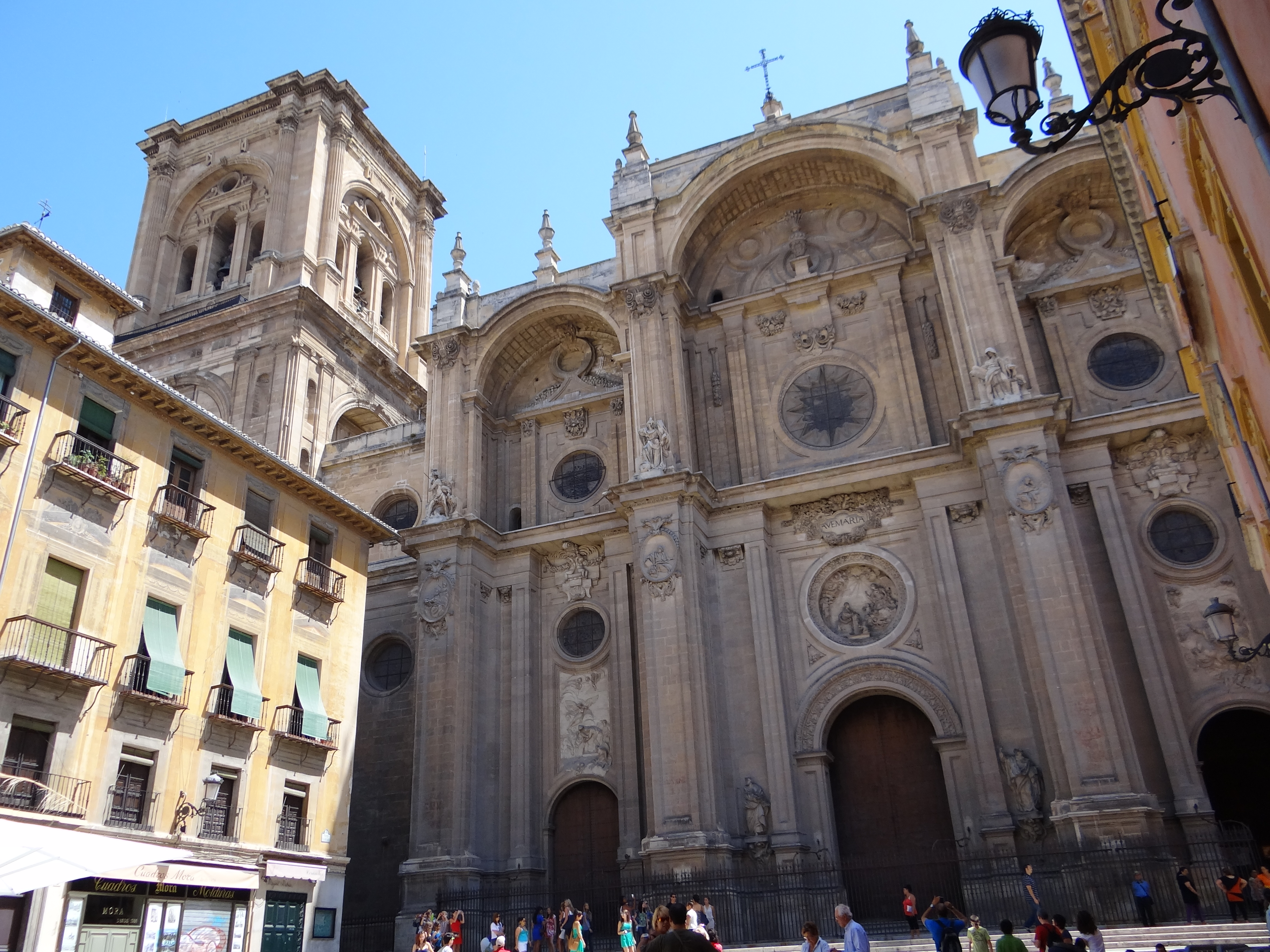
- Granada Cathedral

Location
- Country: Spain
- Ecclesiastical province: Granada

Statistics
- Area: 6,945 km^{2} (2,681 sq mi)
- Population: Total; Catholics: (as of 2006); 860,898; 743,530 (86.9%)

Information
- Denomination: Roman Catholic
- Sui iuris church: Latin Church
- Rite: Roman Rite
- Established: 3rd Century (As Diocese of Elvira); 10 December 1492 (As Archdiocese of Granada)
- Cathedral: Cathedral of the Annunciation in Granada

Current leadership
- Pope: Leo XIV
- Metropolitan Archbishop: José María Gil Tamayo
- Suffragans: Diocese of Almería; Diocese of Cartagena; Diocese of Guadix; Diocese of Jaén; Diocese of Málaga
- Bishops emeritus: Francisco Javier Martínez Fernández; Antonio Cañizares Llovera

Map

Website
- Website of the Archdiocese

The Archdiocese of Granada (Latin: archidioecesis Granatensis) is a Latin ecclesiastical province of the Catholic Church in Spain. The ancient Diocese of Elvira dates back to the 3rd century. A titular episcopal see of Granada was established in 1437, and the see was restored as a metropolitan archdiocese in 1492 and was elevated to the rank of a metropolitan archdiocese in 1492, by papal authority under Pope Innocent VIII. Its current suffragan sees are Almería, Cartagena, Guadix, Jaén and Málaga.

The archdiocese's mother church and seat of its archbishop is the Cathedral of the Incarnation in Granada, which also houses the Basilicas of San Juan de Dios and Nuestra Señora de las Angustias. The current archbishop of Granada is José María Gil Tamayo, appointed by Pope Francis on 1st of February, 2023.

== Ordinaries ==
=== Bishops of Elvira ===
The following list is based on the Nomina defunctorum episcoporum Spalensis sedis uel Toletane atque Eliberritane sedis ("Names of the deceased bishops of the see of Seville and of the sees of Toledo and Elvira"), a necrology of bishops of those sees found in the Codex Emilianense, which was compiled between 962 and 994.

- Caecilius (1st century), legendary
- Leubesind
- Ameantus
- Ascanius
- Julian
- Augustulus
- Marturius
- Gregory I
- Peter I
- Fabian (c. 300–306)
- Honasterius
- Optatus
- Peter II
- Zoilus
- Gregory II (c. 350 – c. 390)
- John I
- Valerius
- Lusidius
- John II
- John III
- Ursus
- John IV
- John V
- Mantius
- Respectus
- Caritonus or Orontius (fl. 516)
- Peter III
- Vincent
- Honorius
- Stephen (fl. 589)
- Baddo or Batonius (fl. 597)
- Bissinus (fl. 610–619)
- Felix
- Iterius (fl. 633–646)
- Aga (fl. 653)
- Anthony
- Argebad or Argibadonius (fl. 681–683)
- Argemir
- Bapiria
- John VI (fl. 688)
- Ceterius (fl. 693)
- Trectemund
- Dadila
- Adica
- Balduigius
- Egila (c. 777–785)
- Daniel
- Gervase I
- Turibius
- Agila
- Gebuldo
- Sintila
- Samuel I (850–864)
- Gervase II
- Reccared
- Manila
- Sennaion
- Nifridius (fl. 939)
- Samuel II
- Pantaleon
- Gundafor
- Pirricius
- Gapio
- Recemund (fl. 962), the last known bishop of Elvira

=== Bishops of Granada ===
- Gonzalo de Vallebuena, O.F.M. (13 Sep 1437 – 1442 died)
- Juan de Haterano (19 Dec 1442 – 1446)
- Diego de Guadalajara (9 Jan 1447 – c. 1470)
- Fernando de Castilla, O.S.B. (10 Dec 1473 – 1479 died)
- Juan de Pastor (23 July 1479 – ????)

=== Archbishops of Granada ===
- Hernando de Talavera, O.S.H. (23 Jan 1493 – 14 May 1507 died)
- Antonio de Rojas Manrique (1507 – 1524 Appointed, Patriarch of the West Indies)
- Francisco Herrera Ruesta (8 Jun 1524 – Dec 1524 died)
- Pedro Portocarrero (archbishop) (26 Jun 1525 – 5 Jun 1526 died)
- Pedro Ramírez de Alba, O.S.H. (19 Dec 1526 – 21 Jun 1528 died)
- Gaspar de Ávalos de la Cueva (22 Jan 1529 – 29 Mar 1542 Appointed, Archbishop of Santiago de Compostela)
- Fernando Niño de Guevara (patriarch) (22 Mar 1542 – 8 Oct 1546 Appointed, Patriarch of the West Indies)
- Pedro Guerrero Logrono (Mendoza) (28 Oct 1546 – 2 Apr 1576 died)
- Juan Méndez de Salvatierra (11 Sep 1577 – 24 May 1588 died)
- Pedro Castro Quiñones (6 Dec 1589 – 5 Jul 1610 Appointed, Archbishop of Sevilla)
- Pedro González de Mendoza, O.F.M. (19 Jul 1610 – 8 Feb 1616 Appointed, Archbishop of Zaragoza)
- Felipe Tarsis de Acuña, O.S. (24 Feb 1616 – 20 Jun 1620 died)
- Garcerán Albañell (16 Nov 1620 – 10 Mar 1626 died)
- Agustin Spinola Basadone (7 Sep 1626 – 23 Oct 1630 Appointed, Archbishop of Santiago de Compostela)
- Miguel Santos de San Pedro (13 Nov 1630 – 4 Mar 1633 died)
- Fernando Valdés Llano (18 Jul 1633 – 30 Dec 1639 died)
- Martín Carrillo Alderete (1 Jul 1641 – 29 Jun 1653 died)
- Antonio Calderon (bishop) (12 Jan 1654 – 12 Jul 1654 died)
- José de Argáiz Pérez (27 Jul 1654 – 28 May 1667 died)
- Diego Escolano y Ledesma (27 Feb 1668 – 4 Sep 1672 died)
- Francisco de Rois y Mendoza, O. Cist. (29 May 1673 – 16 Mar 1677 died)
- Alfonso Bernardo de los Ríos y Guzmán, O.SS.T. (13 Sep 1677 – 5 Oct 1692 died)
- Martín Ascargorta (18 May 1693 – 25 Feb 1719 died)
- Francisco Eustaquio Perea Porras (3 Jul 1720 – 26 Jun 1733 died)
- Felipe de los Tueros Huerta (20 Jan 1734 – 12 Sep 1751 died)
- Onésimo Salamanca Zaldívar (20 Mar 1752 – 19 Dec 1757 Appointed, Archbishop of Burgos)
- Pedro Antonio Barroeta y Ángel (19 Dec 1757 – 20 Mar 1775 died)
- Antonio Jorge y Galván (29 Jan 1776 – 2 Sep 1787 died)
- Basilio Tomás Sancho y Hernando (de Santas Justa y Rufina), Sch. P. (17 Dec 1787 Appointed – Did Not Take Effect)
- Juan Manuel Moscoso y Peralta (3 Aug 1789 – 24 Jul 1811 died)
- Blas Joaquín Álvarez de Palma (19 Dec 1814 – 29 Nov 1837 died)
- Luis Antonio Folgueras y Sión (17 Jan 1848 – 28 Oct 1850 died)
- Salvador José Reyes y García de Lara (5 Sep 1851 – 31 Mar 1865 died)
- Bienvenido Monzón y Martín (8 Jun 1866 Confirmed – 27 Mar 1885 Appointed, Archbishop of Sevilla)
- José Moreno y Mazón (27 Mar 1885 – 17 Jan 1905 died)
- José Meseguer y Costa (27 Mar 1905 – 9 Dec 1920 died)
- Vicente Casanova y Marzol (7 Mar 1921 – 23 Oct 1930 died)
- Agustín Parrado y García (4 Apr 1934 – 8 Oct 1946 died)
- Balbino Santos Olvera (24 Nov 1946 – 14 Feb 1953 died)
- Rafael García y García de Castro (9 May 1953 – 3 Feb 1974 died)
- Emilio Benavent Escuín (3 Feb 1974 Succeeded – 25 May 1977 Appointed, Archbishop (Personal Title) of Spain, Military)
- José Méndez Asensio (31 Jan 1978 – 10 Dec 1996 Retired)
- Antonio Cañizares Llovera (10 Dec 1996 – 24 Oct 2002 Appointed, Archbishop of Toledo)
- Francisco Javier Martínez Fernández (15 Mar 2003 – 1 Feb 2023 Retired)
- José María Gil Tamayo (1 Feb 2023 – )

== See also ==
- Roman Catholicism in Spain
