= Manuel González García (bishop) =

Spanish bishop

Saint Manuel González García
- Bishop of Palencia
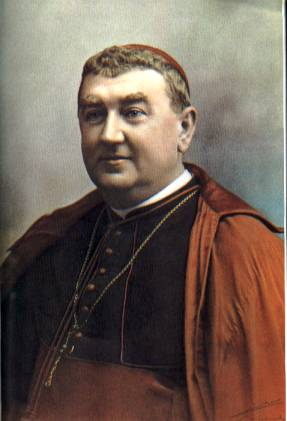
- c. 1910
- Church: Roman Catholic Church
- Diocese: Palencia
- See: Palencia
- Appointed: 5 August 1935
- Installed: 1935
- Term ended: 4 January 1940
- Predecessor: Agustín Parrado y García
- Successor: Francisco Javer Lauzurica y Torralba
- Other post: Titular Bishop of Olympus (1915-1940)
- Previous posts: Auxiliary Bishop of Málaga (1915-1920); Bishop of Málaga (1920-1935)

Orders
- Ordination: 21 September 1901 by Marcelo Spinola y Maestre
- Consecration: 16 January 1916 by Enrique Almaraz y Santos
- Rank: Bishop

Personal details
- Born: Manuel González García; 25 February 1877 Seville, Kingdom of Spain
- Died: 4 January 1940 (aged 62) Palencia, Francoist Spain
- Buried: Cathedral of Palencia, Spain
- Motto: Sustinui qui consolaretur ("Waited for comforters")
- Coat of arms

Sainthood
- Feast day: 4 January
- Venerated in: Roman Catholic Church
- Beatified: 29 April 2001; Saint Peter's Square, Vatican City by Pope John Paul II
- Canonized: 16 October 2016; Saint Peter's Square, Vatican City by Pope Francis
- Attributes: Episcopal attire
- Patronage: Eucharistic Missionaries of Nazareth; Disciples of Saint John; Children of Reparation; Diocese of Palencia

Manuel González García (Note: In this Spanish name, the first or paternal surname is González and the second or maternal family name is García.) (25 February 1877 – 4 January 1940) was a Spanish bishop of the Roman Catholic Church who served as the Bishop of Palencia from 1935 until his death. He was also the founder of the Eucharistic Missionaries of Nazareth and also established both the Disciples of Saint John and the Children of Reparation. He was known for his strong devotion to the Eucharist and became known as the "Bishop of the Tabernacle" due to this devotion; he made it an objective of his to spread devotion to the Eucharist and encouraged frequent reception of it.

The sainthood cause for the late bishop opened in 1981 and he became titled as a Servant of God while Pope John Paul II named him as Venerable on 6 April 1998 upon the confirmation that he exercised heroic virtue in his life. John Paul II also beatified the late bishop on 29 April 2001. Pope Francis canonized him as a saint on 16 October 2016. He is the patron of all his religious orders and of the Diocese of Palencia where he served as a bishop.

== Life ==
Manuel González García was born to Martín González Lara and Antonia García on 25 February 1877 in Seville and had four brothers. He was the fourth of five children born to his parents.

His parents were originally from Antequera, province of Málaga. They married in the Church of San Pedro in that city and moved to Seville around 1875. His father, Martín González Lara, established a carpentry and cabinet-making workshop in 1877, and his mother, Antonia García, took care of the family and home. Manuel González had two older brothers, Francisco and Martín, and a younger sister, Antonia. Manuel Siurot was a friend of the family.

In his childhood he joined a church choir and, prior to the age of ten, served as part of the choir in the Cathedral of Seville. Following the realization of his religious vocation during his late childhood, he enlisted in the seminary of Seville at the age of twelve in September 1889 for studies for the priesthood. It was there that he wrote: "If I would be born a thousand times; a thousand times I would be a priest". He excelled in all his studies and was held in high regard by his teachers. He earned his doctorates in both theology and canon law. He also travelled to Rome to commemorate a jubilee of Pope Leo XIII.

He received the subdiaconate in 1900 and also received the diaconate that same year. He was ordained to the priesthood on 21 September 1901 by the Archbishop of Seville Marcelo Spinola y Maestre – future cardinal and Blessed – in the chapel of the episcopal palace of Seville. While a seminarian, González worked at Spinola's newspaper, El Correo de Andalucía. He celebrated his first Mass on 29 September 1901 in the Church of the Holy Trinity. It was during his first Mass that he entrusted himself to the intercession of Mary, Help of Christians.

In 1902, Bishop Spinola sent him to preach a mission in one of the parishes, and González found the church to be unclean and abandoned. He knelt before the tabernacle and decided then and there to dedicate himself to Eucharistic works in praise of Jesus Christ. One of his first positions as a new priest was to act as the chaplain of the nursing home of the Sisters of the Poor of Seville. On 1 March 1902 he was appointed as the parish priest of San Pedro de Huelva and took office there on 9 March, a week later.

In Huelva he paid careful attention to the disadvantaged people and promoted schools devoted to assisting them and bringing to them teachings pertaining to the Sacred Heart of Jesus Christ. In addition he was also concerned with the working class and helped to provide food for the children whose parents worked as miners; he did this even more so than usual during the winter of the 1913 strike the workers participated in.

González García, on 4 March 1910, first established the Disciples of Saint John, who were to be devoted to the Eucharist and to Saint John; the order soon spread outside of Spain, across Europe. He travelled to Rome in late 1912 and on 28 November had a private audience with Pope Pius X, who demonstrated a keen interest in his work and his devotion to the Eucharist.

Pope Benedict XV appointed him to be the Auxiliary Bishop of Málaga and the Titular Bishop of Olympus on 6 December 1915. This led to his episcopal consecration on 16 January 1916. He was appointed as the Bishop of Málaga in 1920 and held the post until Pope Pius XI appointed him as the Bishop of Palencia in 1935. He received the gratitude and the affection of all, including King Alfonso XIII, who stated in a telegram: "I greet with affection and reverently kiss his pastoral ring." He founded the Eucharistic Missionaries of Nazareth while in Palencia and went on to also found the Children of Reparation, as well as the Disciples of Saint John. On 11 May 1936, the episcopal palace of Málaga caught on fire and the fire saw the destruction of art and archival materials, and González García came into the palace through the backdoor to see the arsonists who lit the fire.

In June 1937, González García signed the Collective Letter of the Spanish Bishops in which the Catholic prelates supported Franco's military coup of 1936. In November the same year, he published Lecciones de la tragedia presente. Preparando soluciones para la posguerra ("Lessons of the present tragedy. Preparing solutions for post-war"), a pastoral letter that, as Francoist side would later put into practice, pleaded for a "cultural disinfection" (in opposition to "secularizing liberalism") through re-Christianization and re-Spanishization of the population. Due to his actions in the Diocese of Palencia, he has been considered a "very supportive" bishop of dictator Franco.

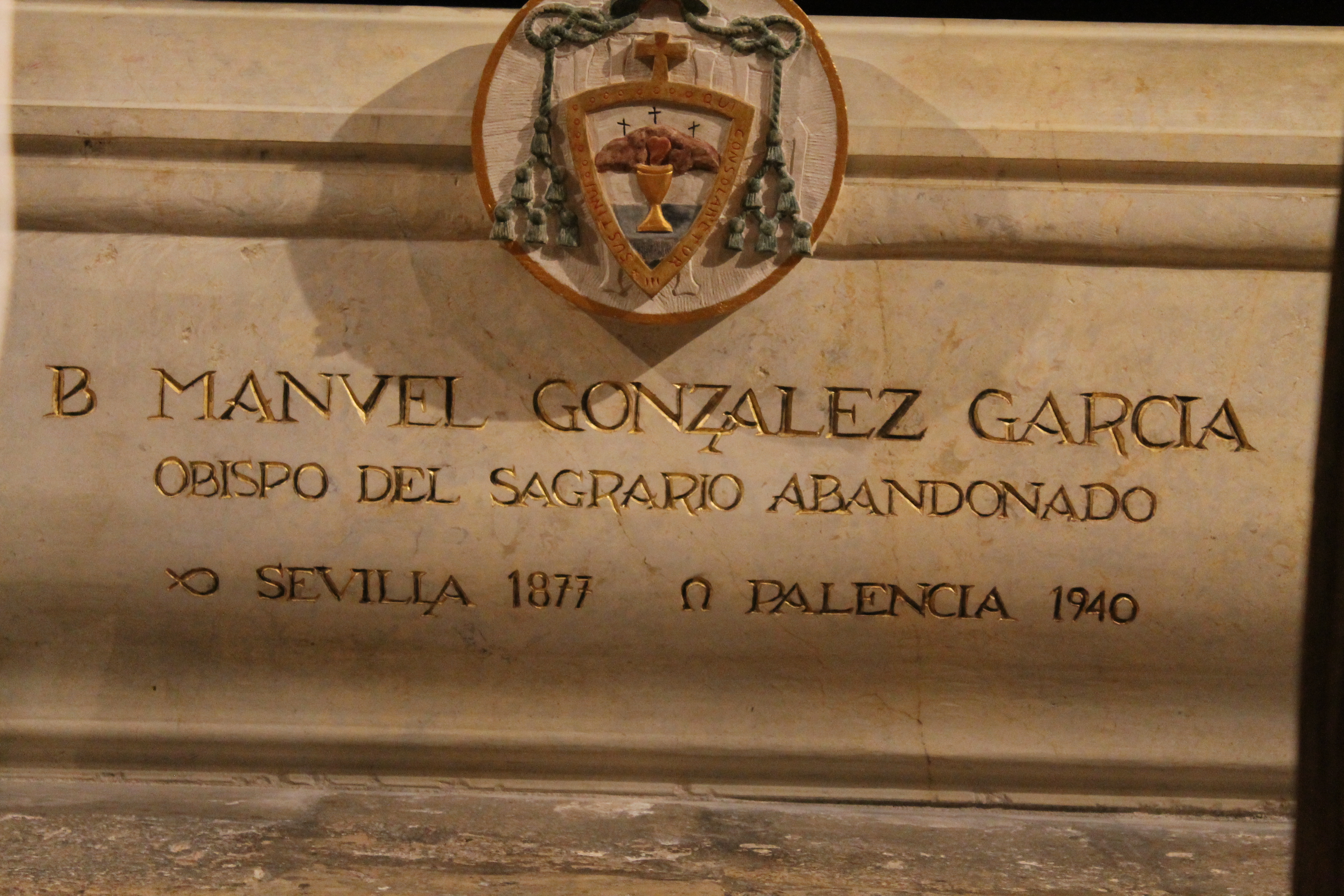
Tomb in Palencia.

González García fell ill in 1939 during a visit to Zaragoza which saw him transferred to Madrid for treatment. He died in 1940 in a clinic and was buried in the Cathedral of Palencia, where he requested to be buried so that he could be close to the tabernacle. His wish was: "I ask to be buried next to a tabernacle, so that my bones, after death, as my tongue and my pen in life, are saying to those who pass: there is Jesus! There it is! Do not leave him abandoned!"

== Sainthood ==
=== First process and Venerable ===
The process of beatification started on 31 July 1981 in Spain to gather documentation needed for the cause and the commencement of the cause allowed for him to receive the posthumous title Servant of God. This also saw two processes open in Palencia; the first opened on 2 May 1952. One in Málaga was held in 1979 and another in Palencia from 1981 until a year later.

The compiled dossier known as the Positio documented his life of heroic virtue and was sent to the Congregation for the Causes of Saints in 1991. This led to Pope John Paul II proclaiming him to be Venerable on 6 April 1998 on the account of such virtue.

=== Beatification ===
After an independent tribunal investigated a miracle attributed to him it was validated in 1998 and received papal approval; the pope signed a decree recognizing a miracle attributed to him on 29 December 1999, leading to his beatification on 29 April 2001. The miracle took place in Palencia in December 1953 and was the healing of tuberculosis of Sara Ruiz Ortega, then eighteen.

=== Canonization ===
==== Miracle ====
The second miracle attributed to him was the healing of María del Carmen Feijóo Varela. The healing took place in October 2008 when she was diagnosed with an extreme medical illness that progressed into an aggressive cancer which reduced Varela to a weak condition. She requested the last rites but the priest could not make it to her in time and so sent a relic of the late bishop.

Less than a week after while retaining the relic, doctors were amazed to see that the cancer had disappeared in full despite a wide range of tests. The medical report declared that "there has been a spontaneous regression" of the ailment.

==== Process ====
Another miracle was alleged to have been attributed to his intercession and the process that investigated it was validated on 21 October 2011. That process spanned from 7 October 2009 until 31 May 2010. The medical board that advises the Congregation approved the findings of the investigation on 29 October 2015 and the theologians later approved it two less than two months later on 15 December 2015. It then went to the Congregation itself and was approved on 1 March 2016; it went to the pope for approval on 3 March 2016 – and was affirmative – and it allowed for his canonization to take place though a date for the sanctification had to be formalized at a gathering of cardinals held on 20 June.

He was canonized as a saint of the Roman Catholic Church on 16 October 2016 in Saint Peter's Square.

=== Postulation ===
The postulator assigned to the cause at the time of the canonization was Romualdo Rodrigo Lozano.
