= José María Gil Tamayo =

Spanish Catholic bishop (born 1957)

His Grace, The Most Reverend, Monsignor José María Gil Tamayo
- Metropolitan Archbishop of Granada
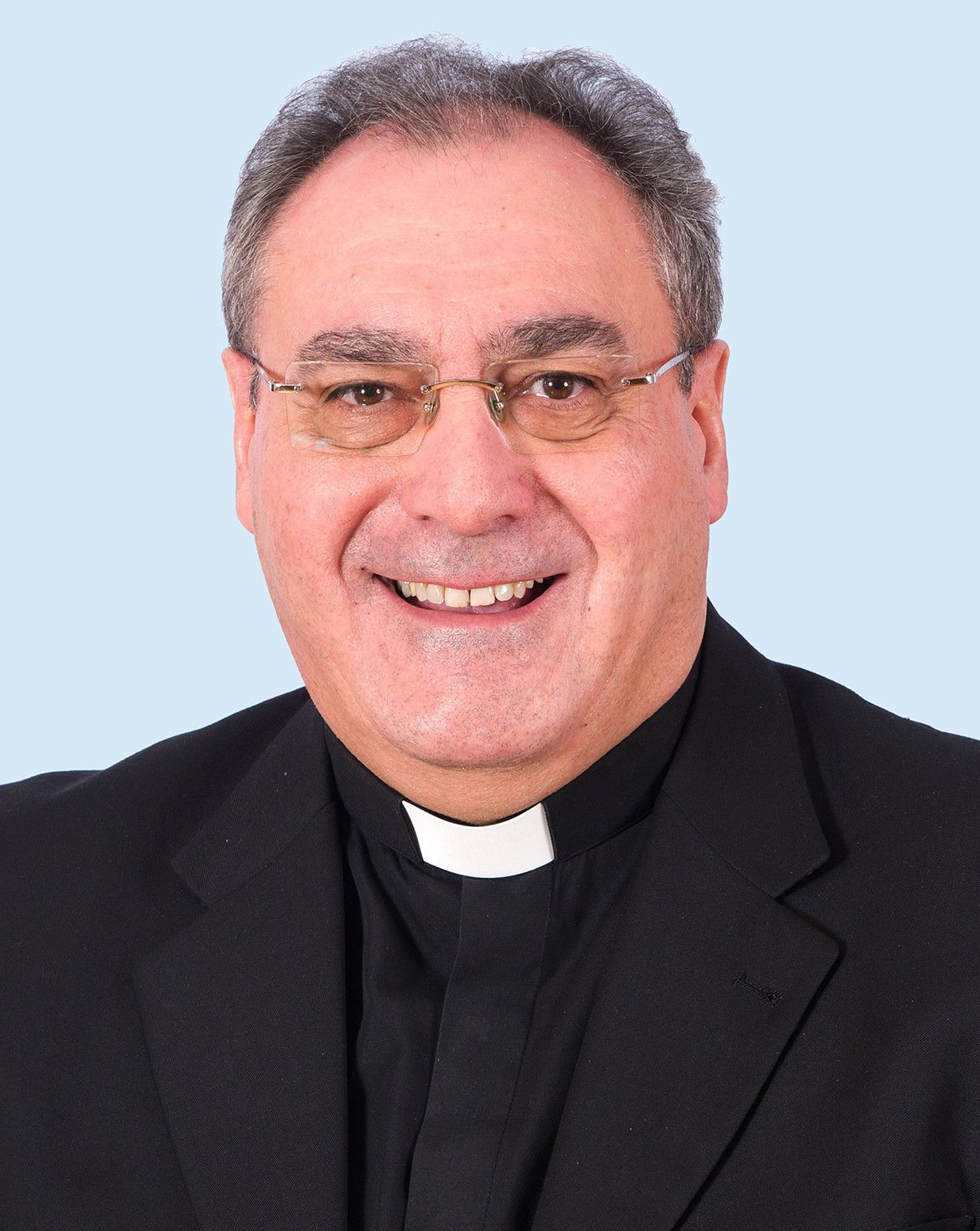
- Church: Roman Catholic Church
- Archdiocese: Granada
- Province: Granada
- Appointed: 1 February 2023
- Installed: 1 February 2023
- Predecessor: Francisco Javier Martínez Fernández
- Previous posts: Bishop of Avila (2018–2022); Coadjutor Archbishop of Granada (2022–2023)

Orders
- Ordination: 7 September 1980
- Consecration: 15 December 2018 by Ricardo Blázquez

Personal details
- Born: José María Gil Tamayo; 5 June 1957 (age 69) Badajoz, Spain
- Denomination: Roman Catholic
- Residence: Granada, Spain
- Occupation: Archbishop, Clergyman
- Profession: Theologian, Philosopher
- Education: University of Navarre
- Motto: Non ministrari sed ministrare

- Coat of arms

José María Gil Tamayo (born 5 June 1957) is a Spanish prelate of the Roman Catholic Church. He has been serving as archbishop of Granada since his installation on 1 February 2023. He previously served as coadjutor archbishop of that archdiocese and as bishop of Ávila.

Gil became a priest in 1980 and was named bishop in 2018; after his ordination, he did pastoral work in Latin America and the Caribbean. He had many communication-related roles.

== Early life ==
José María Gil Tamayo was born on 5 June 1957 in the municipality of Zalamea de la Serena, Badajoz, Extremadura. He studied at the seminary of the Archdiocese of Mérida–Badajoz. He earned a licenciate degree in ecclesiology and information science from the University of Navarra.

== Priesthood ==
Gil's sacerdotal ordination was on 7 September 1980; he was incardinated in the Archdiocese of Mérida–Badajoz by Antonio Montero Moreno.

For nine years, he performed pastoral work in rural villages, serving as a parish priest, vicar, and religion teacher. In one of these villages, He worked with local radio stations to provide Christian content, especially for those who couldn't attend Mass.

He started his ministry as a clergyman within the Archdiocese of Mérida–Badajoz. In 1992, he assumed the role of directing Medios de Comunicación y de la Oficina de Información for his diocese. He held the position of canon of the same diocese. Gil has been a professor in communication technologies at Pontifical University of Salamanca and professor at Catholic University of El Salvador

Internationally, he has delivered lectures in El Salvador, Puerto Rico and Cuba. From 2001 to 2011, he was member of the Comité Episcopal Europeo de Medios de Comunicación. He collaborated to the Red Informática de la Iglesia en América Latina and provided advice on pastoral communication services to the Episcopal Conference of El Salvador and Chile. In 2006, he worked at the press office for the Congreso Mundial de TV Católicas.

In 2018, Gil was the spokesperson in the XIII Synod of Bishops in the Catholic Church in Spanish. Furthermore, he was the spokesperson of the Holy See during the resignation of Pope Benedict XVI (February—March 2013) in Spanish. In the Roman Curia, Gil was a consultant of the Pontifical Council for Social Communications from 2006 to 2016.

From 1998 to 2011, Tamayo was the director of the Director of the Media Commission Secretariat of the Spanish Episcopal Conference. He has also directed the Information Service of the Catholic Church in Spain. He has been secretary general of the Spanish Episcopal Conference from 2013 to 2018.

== Bishophood ==
=== Bishop ===
On 6 of November 2018 he was named as bishop of the Diocese of Ávila, replacing Jesús García Burillo. He received his consecration on 15 December 2018 by Ricardo Blázquez on the Ávila Cathedral.

As bishop of Ávila, Gil was president of the foundation Las Edades del Hombre and the Gran Canciller of the Catholic University of Ávila. He has served as a member of the Comisión Episcopal de Medios de Comunicación Social within the Spanish Episcopal Conference from 2019 to 2020. Additionally, he has been a member of the Comisión Ejecutiva since 2020. Moreover, as of 2022, he holds the position of president of the Consejo de Estudios y Proyectos.

In 2021, the bishop asked the government of Spain to declare the area of Navalacruz a disaster zone following a fire in the region. During the COVID-19 pandemic, Tamayo criticized the government for only providing emergency funding to public schools, not to private schools (including Catholic schools), calling this discriminatory. Tamayo was hospitalized in May 2020 for having COVID-19.

Like other bishops, Gil selected a motto and a ecclesiastical coat of arms. His chosen motto, "Non ministrari sed ministrare", is meant to reflect the words of Jesus to his disciples, signifying that he was named to serve, not to be served.

=== Archbishop ===
On 16 July 2022 he was named coadjutor archbishop of Archdiocese of Granada. The position of coadjutor, rarely employed in the Spanish clergy, was utilized to ensure a "peaceful transition" of responsibilities. On 1 February 2023, after the resignation of Francisco Javier Martínez Fernández, he was named by Pope Francis as archbishop of Granada. The Holy See tasked Gil to provide an internal audit on the economic situation of the bishopric, as well as a revitalization of the clergy of Granada. In August 2023, Tamayo attended the inauguration of a new statue of the first Archbishop of Mérida-Granada, Antonio Montero, and blessed the sculpture. In 2024, Tamayo hosted a Chrism Mass for the persecuted clergy of Nicaragua, where he announced that the Archdiocese of Granada would welcome Nicaraguan clergy in need.
