= Pedro Antonio Barroeta y Ángel =

Spanish Catholic priest

- Archbishop of Granada
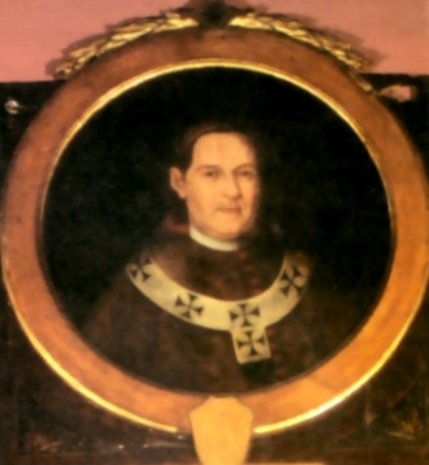
- Church: Catholic Church
- Archdiocese: Archdiocese of Granada
- In office: 19 December 1757 – 20 March 1775
- Predecessor: Onésimo de Salamanca
- Successor: Antonio Jorge y Galván
- Previous post: Archbishop of Lima (1748-1757)

Orders
- Consecration: 3 January 1751 by Bernardo de Arbiza y Ugarte

Personal details
- Born: 25 October 1701 Ezcaray, Kingdom of Castile, Crown of Castile
- Died: 20 March 1775 (aged 73) Granada, Kingdom of Granada, Kingdom of Spain and the Indies

Pedro Antonio Barroeta y Ángel (25 October 1701 – 20 March 1775) was a Spanish Catholic priest who served as Archbishop of Lima and Archbishop of Granada.

Pedro Antonio Barroeta y Ángel was born on 25 October 1701 in Ezcaray, Logrono, Spain. He studied theology at Cuenca, and soon became noted for his learning. After filling several high offices at Coria and Malaga he was appointed archbishop of Lima, Peru and consecrated 25 June 1751. He at once began to promote reforms among the clergy and in the church administration, devoting himself entirely to that purpose and to charity. Barroeta distributed all his revenues among the needy, and when transferred to the see of Granada, Spain in 1758, he was so poor that his brother had to pay the expenses of the voyage. Pedro Antonio Barroeta y Ángel died on 20 March 1775 in Granada.

Catholic Church titles
| Preceded by Agustín Rodríguez Delgado | Archbishop of Lima; 1748-1757 | Succeeded by Diego del Corro |
| Preceded by Onésimo Salamanca Zaldívar | Archbishop of Granada; 1757-1775 | Succeeded by Antonio Jorge y Galván |
