= Fuensaldaña =

Coordinates: 41°42′N 4°46′W

Fuensaldaña, Spain
- Coat of arms

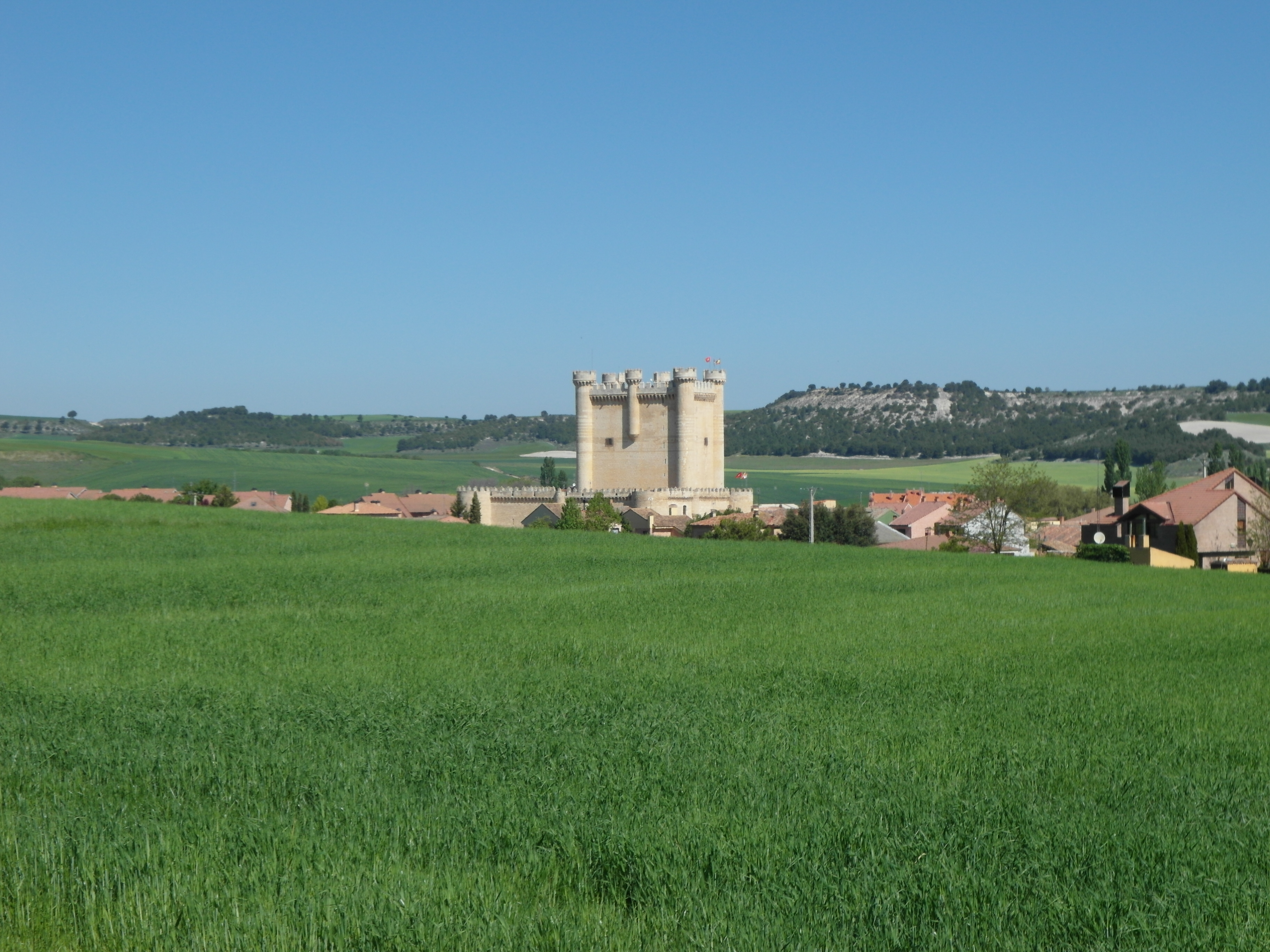
- Country: Spain
- Autonomous community: Castile and León
- Province: Valladolid
- Municipality: Fuensaldaña

Area
  - Total: 25 km^{2} (9.7 sq mi)

Population (2025-01-01)
  - Total: 2,146
  - Density: 86/km^{2} (220/sq mi)
- Time zone: UTC+1 (CET)
  - Summer (DST): UTC+2 (CEST)

Fuensaldaña is a municipality located in the province of Valladolid, Castile and León, Spain. According to the 2004 census (INE), the municipality has a population of 1,149 inhabitants.

== See also ==
- Cuisine of the province of Valladolid
