= Football for Friendship =

International children's social project

Football for Friendship (Russian: ФУТБОЛ ДЛЯ ДРУЖБЫ), also known as F4F, is an international children's social programme implemented by the Russian oil conglomerate Gazprom. The programme, along with its spinoffs, came to an end in the Western world after Russia's invasion of Ukraine. The programme continues in Russia and some allied states.

Within the framework of the programme, football players at the age of 12 from different countries take part in the annual "Football for Friendship Children's Forum", "Football for Friendship World Championship", and "International Day of Football and Friendship". The global operator of the programme is AGT Communications Group (Russia).

== History ==
=== Football for Friendship 2013 ===
The first International Children's Forum Football for Friendship was held on May 25, 2013, in London. 670 children participated, coming from 8 countries: Bulgaria, Great Britain, Hungary, Germany, Greece, Russia, Serbia and Slovenia. Russia was represented by 11 football teams from the 11 Russian cities that would host the FIFA World Cup matches in 2018. The junior teams of Zenit, Chelsea, Schalke 04, Crvena Zvezda clubs, winners of the children's sports day of Gazprom, and winners of the Fakel festival also participated in the forum.

During the Forum, the children talked with their peers from other countries, met famous footballers, and attended the UEFA Champions League 2012–2013 Final at Wembley Stadium.

The result of the forum was an open letter in which the children formulated the eight values of the program: friendship, equality, fairness, health, peace, devotion, victory and traditions. Later, the letter was sent to the heads of the UEFA, FIFA and IOC.

=== Football for Friendship 2014 ===
The second season of the Football for Friendship Programme was held in Lisbon on May 23–25, 2014 and hosted more than 450 teenagers from 16 countries: Belarus, Bulgaria, Great Britain, Hungary, Germany, Italy, Netherlands, Poland, Portugal, Russia, Serbia, Slovenia, Turkey, Ukraine, France and Croatia. The young footballers took part in the international International Football for Friendship Forum, a tournament in street football and attended the UEFA Champions League 2013-2014 Final. The winner of the International Street Football Tournament in 2014 was the Benfica junior team from Portugal.

=== Football for Friendship 2015 ===
The third season of the International Social Programme Football for Friendship was held in June 2015 in Berlin. Young participants from Asia, including Japan, China and Kazakhstan, participated in the programme for the first time. In total, junior teams from 24 football clubs from 24 countries took part in the third season. The young footballers talked with their peers from other countries and stars of world football, including the global ambassador of the program, Franz Beckenbauer, and also took part in the International tournament of street football among junior teams. The winner of the International Street Football Tournament in 2015 was the Rapid junior team from Austria.

=== Football for Friendship 2016 ===
In the fourth season of the Programme, 8 new junior teams from Azerbaijan, Algeria, Armenia, Argentina, Brazil, Vietnam, Kyrgyzstan, and Syria joined, making the total number of participating countries 32.

=== Football for Friendship 2017 ===
In 2017, the number of participating countries increased from 32 to 64. For the first time, the Football for Friendship Programme was attended by children from Mexico and the United States. Thus, the project united young players of four continents — Africa, Eurasia, North America and South America.

=== Football for Friendship 2018 ===
In 2018, it was decided that the sixth season of the Football for Friendship Programme would be held from February 15 to June 15 in Russia. The programme participants include young footballers and journalists representing 211 countries and regions of the world. The official start of the 2018 programme was made by the Open Draw, by the results of which 32 football teams – International Teams of Friendship – were formed.

=== Football for Friendship 2019 ===
In 2019, the seventh season of the Programme was launched on March 18, 2019. The final events of the F4F were held in Madrid from May 28 to June 2. The International Day of Football and Friendship was celebrated on April 25 in more than 50 countries in Europe, Asia, Africa, North and South America. The Russian Football Union (RFU) also joined the celebration. The Gazprom International Children's Social Programme F4F Forum was held in Madrid on May 30, 2019. It brought together experts from all over the world, including football coaches, doctors of children's teams, stars, journalists from leading international media, and representatives of international football academies and federations. The world's most multinational football training session took place in Madrid on May 31. As a result of the training session, Football for Friendship received an official Guinness Works Records certificate for the most nationalities in a football match. During the seventh season, 32 young journalists from Europe, Africa, Asia, North and South America were part of the Football for Friendship International Children's Press Center, which covered the final events and participated in the preparation of materials together with international and national media. Participants of the seventh season presented the Nine Values Cup (an International Children's Social Programme Football for Friendship Award) to the Liverpool Football Club as the most socially responsible team. On June 1, the culmination of the seventh season - the final match of the Football for Friendship World Cup - took place on the UEFA Pitch in Madrid. The Antiguan Snake national team tied the Tasmanian Devil 1:1 in regulation time, and then won the penalty shootout, thereby winning the main prize.

=== Football for Friendship 2020 ===
In 2020, the final events of the eighth season of Football for Friendship were held online on a digital platform from November 27 to December 9, 2020. More than 10,000 participants from over 100 countries around the world joined the key events. For the programme's eighth season, the Football for Friendship World multiplayer online football simulator was developed, on the basis of which the 2020 Football for Friendship World Championship was held. The game has been available for downloading worldwide since December 10, 2020, World Football Day. Users got an opportunity to participate in matches according to the rules of the Football for Friendship, uniting in international teams. The multiplayer game is based on the programme's core values, such as friendship, peace, and equality. On November 27, the 2020 Football for Friendship World Championship Open Draw took place. From November 28 to December 6, an Online International Friendship Camp with humanitarian and sports educational programmes for children was held. From November 30 to December 4, sessions of the Online International Football for Friendship Forum were held, at which projects on the development of children's sports were presented. An expert forum evaluated the presentation of projects vying for the International Football for Friendship Award.

From December 7–8, the Football for Friendship World Championship was held. This year's Championship was held in an online format on a digital platform, for which the Football for Friendship World multiplayer football simulator was specially developed. The Football for Friendship Grand Final took place on December 9. A series of webinars for children from different countries in support of the 75th anniversary of the UN took place during the Programme's eighth season. The Stadium is Where I Am, a YouTube show, was launched with the participation of football freestylers from all around the world. In each episode, freestylers taught young ambassadors to perform tricks and, at the end of each episode, a competition for the best trick was announced. The show concluded with a global online master class, with which the Football for Friendship Programme set a second Guinness World Record, this time for the number of participants involved, on December 6, 2020. Good News Editors was a weekly show launched by the Young Journalists of Football for Friendship, in which children shared positive news from around the world with viewers.

=== Football for Friendship 2021 ===
In 2021, the ninth season of the Football for Friendship program culminated in a series of online events, which were held on the F4F digital platform on 14–29 March 2021 and united kids from over 200 countries.

On the International Day of Football and Friendship, celebrated on 25 April, an open draw was made for the Football for Friendship world online championship. Another highlight of the season was the Online International Friendship Camp, which featured educational programs in humanities and sports for children.

At the Online International Football for Friendship Forum, football academies from all over the world came up with their projects for development of children's sports. Having examined the presentations, the expert jury awarded the International Football for Friendship Award to the academies from Afghanistan, India, Sri Lanka, and Togo.

The Online Football for Friendship World Championship was held on the F4F World multiplayer football simulator, which had been specially developed for the tournament. The team Argali, composed of kids from Aruba, Belize, Guatemala, Costa Rica, and Mexico won in the final match.

For the third time in the F4F program's history, the participants of the ninth season set a Guinness record, this time for the largest number of virtual stadium viewers.

The Grand Final of the tournament took place on 29 May.

Football for Friendship: International Children's News Bureau at Euro 2020

As part of the Football for Friendship program, an international children's news bureau was formed in the run-up to the 2020 UEFA European Football Championship, with the young journalists covering the events across 11 countries hosting the tournament.

The young journalists visited all games of the championship in their countries to cover them through the prism of the Nine Core Values shared by millions of the F4F program participants.

The kids received training at the Nine Values School established under the F4F program. Apart from the core values, the training sessions were dedicated to modern trends in sports journalism and mobile reporting skills.

== Football for Friendship World Championship ==
The International Children's football tournament is held within the framework of the Football for Friendship Programme. Teams participating in the championship – Friendship Teams – are formed during an open draw. The teams are organized on the principle of Football for Friendship: athletes of different nationalities, sex and physical abilities play in the same team.

== International Children’s Press Centre ==
A special feature of the Football for Friendship program is its International Children's Press Center. It was first organised in the Football for Friendship Programme in 2014. Young journalists in the press center cover the events of the programme in their countries: they prepare news for national and international sports media and participate in the creation of materials for the Football for Friendship TV channel, the children's Football for Friendship newspaper and the program's official radio station. The International Children's Press Center unites the winners of the Best Young Journalist national contests, young bloggers, photographers and writers. Young journalists from the press center present their view from within the Programme, implementing the format "children about children".

== International Day of Football and Friendship ==
Under the Football for Friendship Programme, the International Day of Football and Friendship is celebrated on April 25. This holiday was celebrated for the first time in 2014 in 16 countries. On this day, friendly matches, flash mobs, radio marathons, master classes, television shows and open training sessions took place. More than 50,000 people took part in the celebration.

In 2015, the International Day of Football and Friendship was celebrated in 24 countries. During the festival, there were friendly football matches and other events. In Germany, Schalke 04 footballers held an open training session, Serbia hosted a TV show, and Ukraine held a match between the junior team of Volyn FC and children who were registered at the Lutsk city center of social services for families, children and young people.

In Russia, the International Day of Football and Friendship was celebrated on April 25 in 11 cities. Friendly football matches were held in Vladivostok, Novosibirsk, Yekaterinburg, Krasnoyarsk, Barnaul, St. Petersburg and Saransk, to recall the key values of the program. In Krasnoyarsk, Sochi and Rostov-on-Don, a Friendship Relay was held with the participation of torchbearers from the Olympic Torch Relay 2014. In Moscow, with the support of the Sports Federation of the Blind, an Equal Opportunity Tournament was organized. On May 5, the Day of Football and Friendship was celebrated in Nizhny Novgorod and Kazan.

In 2016, the International Day of Football and Friendship was celebrated in 32 countries. In Russia, it was celebrated in nine cities: Moscow, St. Petersburg, Novosibirsk, Barnaul, Birobidzhan, Irkutsk, Krasnodar, Nizhny Novgorod and Rostov-on-Don. Nizhny Novgorod hosted a friendly match for young footballers from Volga FC, and adult players from the club conducted warm-up and training for the children. In a friendly match in Novosibirsk, disabled children took part in the Novosibirsk regional team, Yermak-Sibir.

In 2017, the International Day of Football and Friendship was celebrated in 64 countries. Famous footballers, including Serbian defender Branislav Ivanovich, and Dutch striker Dirk Kuyt, took part in events around the world. In Greece, the event was attended by Theodoras Zagorakis, a winner of the European Football Championship 2004 with his country's national team. In Russia, Zenit FC hosted a special training session for Zakhar Badyuk, the young Ambassador of the Football for Friendship program in 2017. In training, Zenit FC goalkeeper Yury Lodygin gave a high rating to Zakhar's abilities and shared the secrets of goalkeeping with him.

== Friendship bracelet ==
All the activities of the Football for Friendship Programme begin with the exchange of Friendship Bracelets, a symbol of equality and a healthy lifestyle. The bracelet consists of two threads of blue and green, and it can be worn by anyone who shares the program's values.

According to Franz Beckenbauer:

"The symbol of the movement is a two-color bracelet, it is as simple and understandable as the inherent values of the Football for Friendship program".

Young participants in the program have tied Friendship Bracelets on the wrists of famous sportsmen and public figures, including Dick Advocaat, Anatoly Timoshchuk, Luis Netu, Franz Beckenbauer, Luis Fernandev, Didier Drogba, Max Meyer, Fatma Samura, Leon Gorecka, Domenico Krishito, Michel Salgado, Alexander Kerzhakov, Dimas Pirros, Miodrag Bozovic, Adelina Sotnikova and Yuri Kamenets.

== NFT trophy for best goal of UEFA Euro 2020 ==
In May 2021, UEFA announced that Gazprom would be a partner to Euro 2020 and Euro 2024. According to the partnership terms, the company would present the UEFA Euro 2020 best goal prize, made, for the first time ever, in the NFT format.

The physical prototype of the prize was created by the Russian calligraffiti artist Pokras Lampas at the Gazprom booth in the fan zone at Konyushennaya Square, St. Petersburg, as an installation artwork featuring 432 footballs ornamented with calligraphic patterns.

The digital trophy contained the encrypted names of the 2020 UEFA Euro Championship, Football for Friendship International Children's Social Program and the Nine Core Values it promoted – friendship, equality, fairness, health, peace, devotion, victory, traditions, and honor.

On 27 June, the installation ceased to exist as a physical object and was reborn as a digital artwork in the NFT format. All the footballs were distributed across 11 cities that hosted the UEFA Euro 2020.

At the official award ceremony on 15 October, the digital trophy was presented to Patrik Schick, the best goal scorer of the 2020 UEFA EURO Championship, and its hologram was handed over as an exhibit to the head offices of the UEFA (Nyon, Switzerland) and Gazprom (St. Petersburg, Russia).

== Football for Friendship International Children’s Forum ==
In 2019, the forum transformed into a platform for knowledge exchange between sports and education experts.

In 2020, the forum established the Football for Friendship International Award.

== Football for Friendship International Award ==
The Football for Friendship International Award is meant to globally identify and promote the best ideas for sports coaching, training of young football players, and cooperation in children's football. The goal of the award is to draw public attention to promotion of children's football in the conditions of global digitalization, and form a community of like-minded people developing these areas.

== International Football for Friendship Coaches Academy ==
The International Football for Friendship Coaches Academy is a free online educational platform available in multiple languages. It features a series of practical upskilling sessions for coaches of children's football teams and physical education teachers. The academy's course is based on knowledge, advice and recommendations on how to organize a training process, promote active and healthy lifestyle, and foster respect for different cultures and ethnicities among young players. The course was developed by the educational process managers and coaches of FC Barcelona Academy and FIFA humanitarian program experts.

== International Friendship Camp ==
The International Friendship Camp is an educational program where the F4F participants undergo training and team building sessions under the guidance of professional coaches. It helps children to get on well with each other both on a football pitch and in everyday life, choose the right tactics, and develop a team spirit. As part of the camp, the young participants are trained at the Nine Values School where they learn about the program's values and how to use them during a game and in ordinary life.

== Ecological Initiative ==
The Ecological Initiative is an annual event which has been held since 2016 as part of the Football for Friendship program. Its young participants created the Friendship Garden in the Parco di Trenno, Milan, where each of the 32 international teams planted a tree. The 33rd tree was planted by disabled kids fostered by the Don Carlo Gnocchi Foundation.

In 2018, the young ambassadors of the program drew public attention to animal species threatened with extinction. Every year since then, the international football teams have been named after extinct and rare species. In 2018, eco-friendly buses running on natural gas were used for transportation of the young participants during the final events in Moscow.

In 2020, the young participants of the program held F4F Speaks for Nature, dedicated to environmental protection as part of the World Environment Day established by the UN.

In 2021, the young participants shared their views on how everyone could help the planet and launched the online challenge Small Steps to Save the Planet.

== F4F World Multiplayer Football Simulator ==
This digital platform developed for the Football for Friendship program brought together players of all ages from over 211 countries and regions and gave rise to an international tournament. Additionally it has become a gaming platform where everyone can train, form international teams and play their game in the F4F format without leaving home.

== Awards and prizes ==
As of 2021, the Football for Friendship program has earned over 60 national and global awards in the areas of social responsibility, sports and communications, including three Guinness World Record titles for the largest ever number of ethnicities represented at a single football training session, largest ever number of participants in an online event, and the largest number of viewers at a virtual stadium. Its other awards include SABRE Awards (USA) in the Corporate Social Responsibility category, Gold Quill Awards (USA) in the Best Social Project of the Planet category, Golden Archer Grand Prix (Russia), IPRA Awards (UK) in the Outstanding Campaigns Supporting UN Sustainable Development Goals category, and ICCO Global Awards (UK) in the Best Cross-Cultural Campaign category.

In 2020, the International Football for Friendship Coaches Academy won PRNEWS' Platinum PR Awards (USA). In 2021, the YouTube shows Stadium Is Where I Am and Good News Show, which were organized by children early in the pandemic to support people around the globe, received the awards for the best YouTube channel.
