= Navalacruz =

- municipality
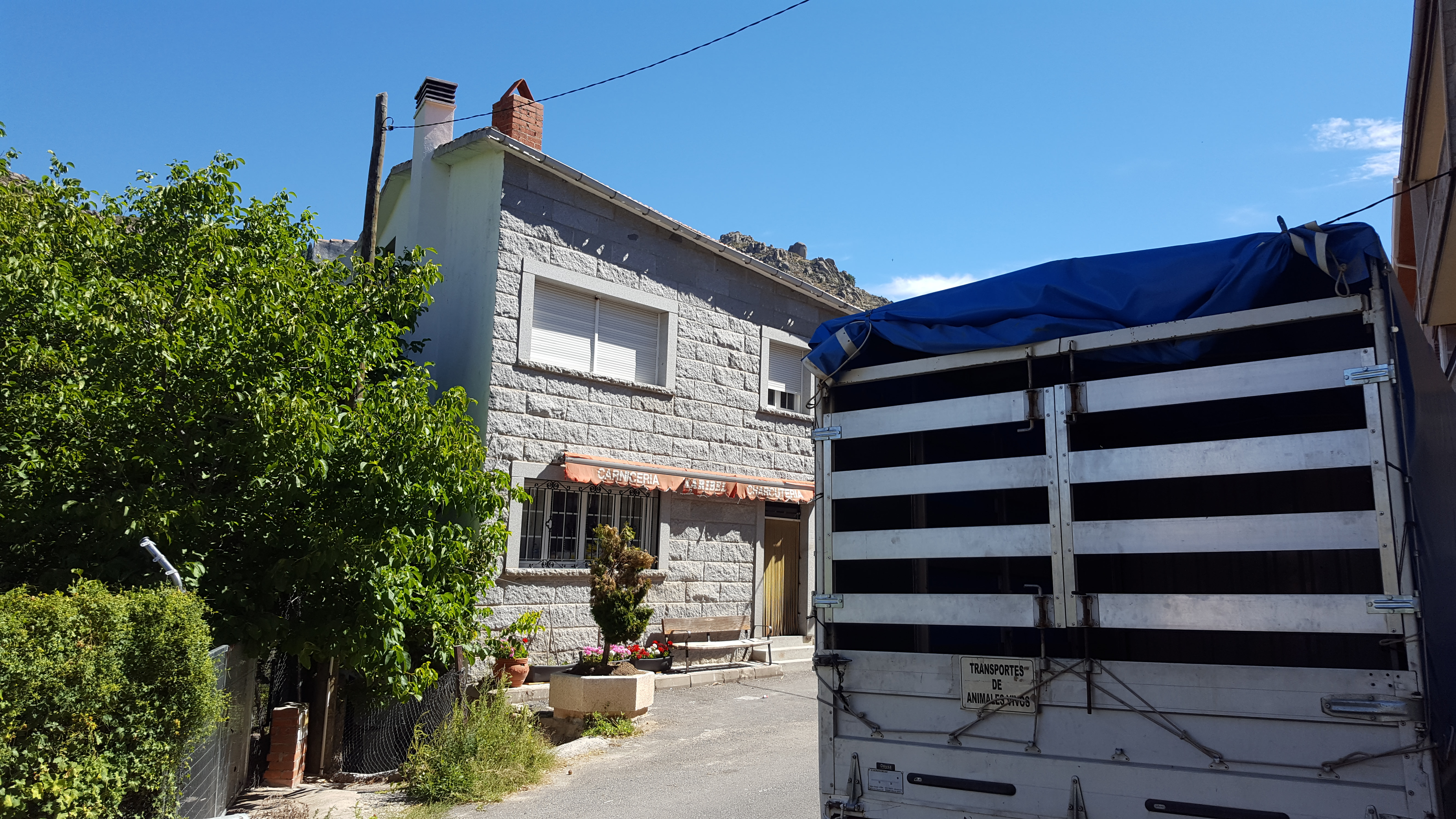
- Butcher Shop in Navalacruz

- Flag Coat of arms

- Location in Spain. Navalacruz (Spain)
- Coordinates: 40°26′25″N 4°55′57″W
- Country: Spain
- Autonomous community: Castile and León
- Province: Ávila
- Municipality: Navalacruz

Area
  - Total: 49 km^{2} (19 sq mi)

Population (2025-01-01)
  - Total: 192
  - Density: 3.9/km^{2} (10/sq mi)
- Time zone: UTC+1 (CET)
  - Summer (DST): UTC+2 (CEST)
- Website: Official website

Navalacruz is a municipality located in the province of Ávila, Castile and León, Spain.

== Population ==
Historical population
Year	Pop.	±% p.a.
2023	218	—
2024	204	−6.42%
2025	192	−5.88%
Source: INE
