= Granada Cathedral =

Roman Catholic church in Andalusia, Spain

- Metropolitan Cathedral Basilica of the Incarnation
- Basílica Catedral Metropolitana de la Encarnación
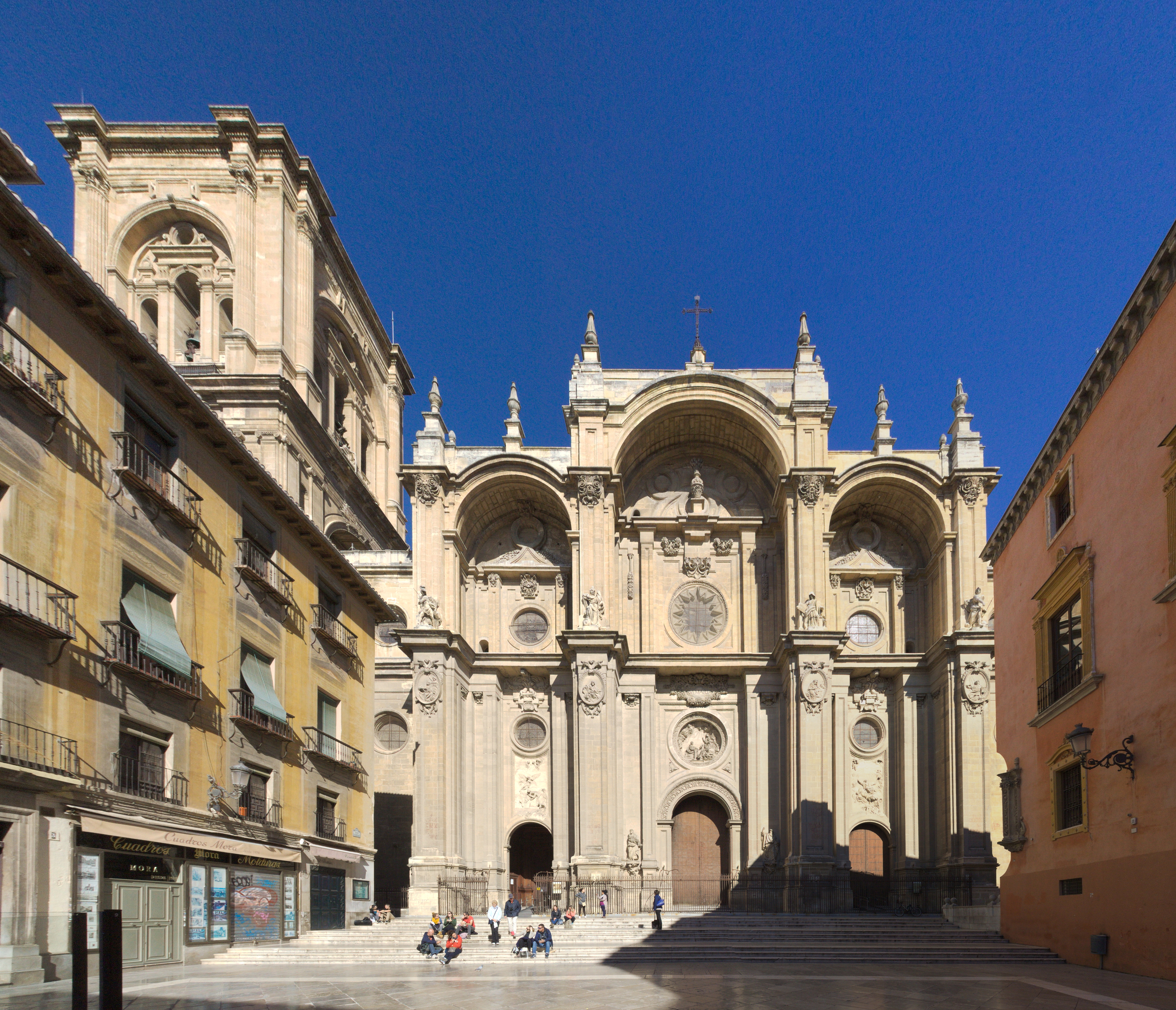
- West façade
- Granada Cathedral
- 37.176°N 3.599°W
- Location: Granada
- Address: 5, Gran Vía de Colón
- Country: Spain
- Denomination: Catholic
- Website: catedraldegranada.com

History
- Status: Cathedral
- Dedication: Incarnation
- Dedicated: 1 December 1946

Architecture
- Architect(s): Enrique Egas, Diego de Siloe, Juan de Maeda
- Style: Renaissance, Baroque
- Groundbreaking: 25 March 1523
- Completed: 24 December 1704

Administration
- Metropolis: Granada

Clergy
- Bishop: José María Gil Tamayo

Spanish Cultural Heritage
- Type: Non-movable
- Criteria: Monument
- Designated: 2 November 1929
- Reference no.: RI-51-0000339

The Metropolitan Cathedral-Basilica of the Incarnation (Spanish: Basílica Catedral Metropolitana de la Encarnación) is a Roman Catholic cathedral in the city of Granada, Spain. The cathedral is the seat of the Archdiocese of Granada. Like many other cathedrals in Andalusia, it was built on top of the city's main mosque after the reconquest of Granada.

== History ==
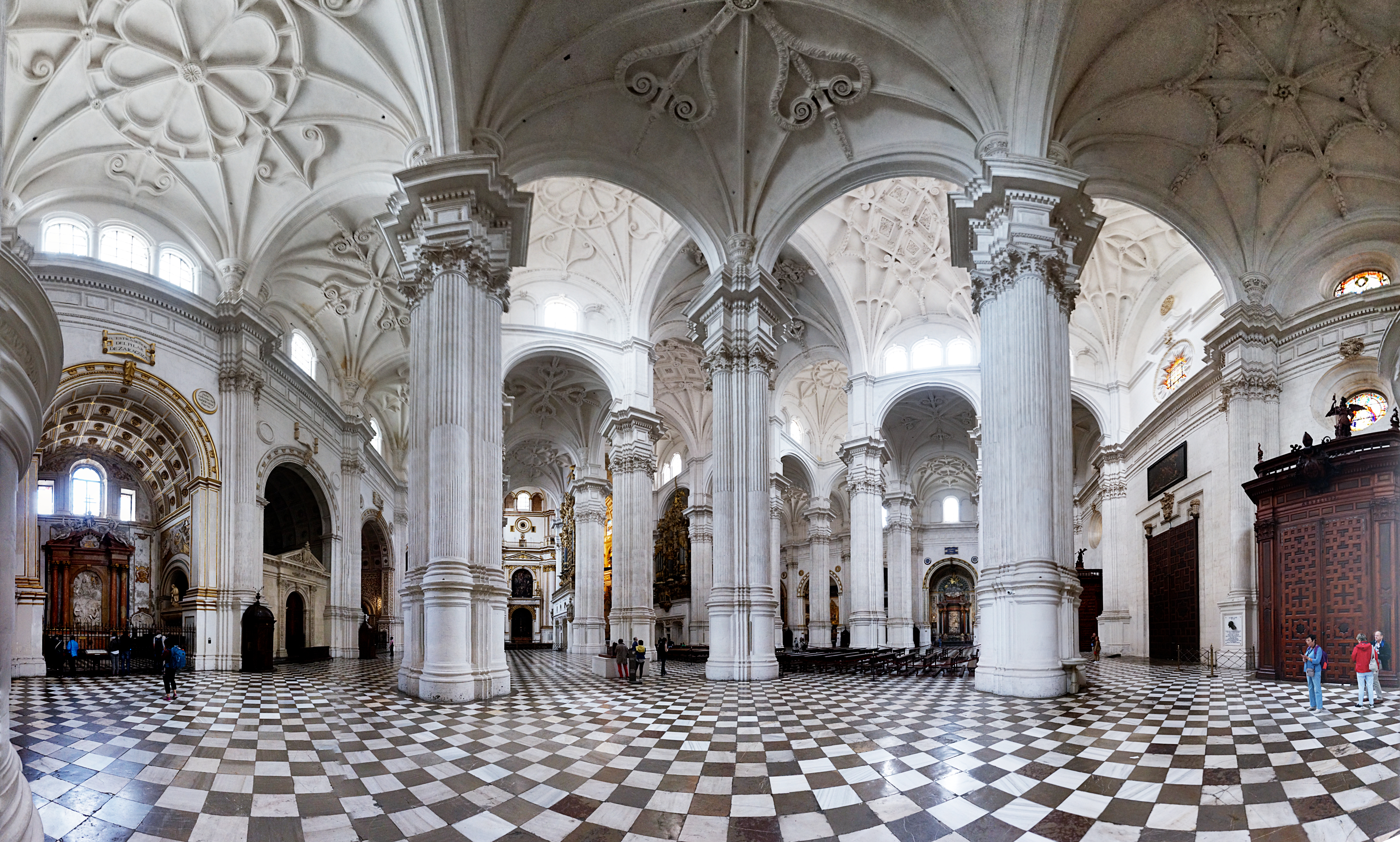
Panoramic view of the interior

The Cathedral of Granada is dedicated to Santa María de la Encarnación. Unlike most cathedrals in Spain, construction was not begun until the sixteenth century in 1518 in the centre of the old Muslim Medina, after acquisition of the Nasrid kingdom of Granada from its Muslim rulers in 1492. While its earliest plans had Gothic designs, such as are evident in the Royal Chapel of Granada by Enrique Egas, most of the church's construction occurred when the Spanish Renaissance style was supplanting the Gothic in Spanish architecture. Foundations for the church were laid by the Enrique Egas starting from 1518 to 1523 atop the site of the city's main mosque.

By 1529, Egas was replaced by Diego de Siloé who worked for nearly four decades on the structure from ground to cornice, planning the triforium and five naves instead of the usual three. Siloé combined a Renaissance dome with a Gothic floor plan, joining the circular and basilica ground plans. Most unusually, he created a circular capilla mayor (principal chapel) rather than a semicircular apse, perhaps inspired by Italian ideas for circular 'perfect buildings' (e.g., in Alberti's works). Within its structure the cathedral also combines other elements of the Vitruvian orders of architecture.

Subsequent architects included Juan de Maena (1563–1571), followed by Juan de Orea (1571–1590), and Ambrosio de Vico (1590–?). In 1667 Alonso Cano, working with Gaspar de la Peña, altered the initial plan for the main façade, introducing Baroque elements. The cathedral took 181 years to build. It would have been even grander had the two 81-meter towers included in the plans been built; however, the project remained incomplete for various reasons, among them financial.

== Features ==
=== Exterior ===
The facade consists of a framed structure in the form of a triumphal arch with portals and canvas. It consists of three pillars crowned by semicircular arches supported on pilasters, similar to San Andrés de Mantua of Leon Battista Alberti. The pilasters do not have capitals but projections sculptured in the walls, as well as attached marble medallions. Above the main door is located a marble tondo from "José Laughing on the Annunciation". Additionally, there is a vase with lilies at the top, alluding to the virgin and pure nature of the mother of God.

At the foot of the cathedral there are two towers. The left one, called the tower of San Miguel, acts as a buttress which replaced the planned tower on that side. A tower restoration project has allowed the construction of a terrace lookout at a height of 56 meters. It is scheduled to open in mid-2026.

=== Interior ===
Granada's cathedral has a rectangular base due to its five naves that completely cover the cross. All of the five naves are staggered in height, the central one being the largest. The dome is populated with gold stars on a blue field. The central oculus of this vault is surrounded by petal shapes.

The main chapel consists of a series of Corinthian columns on which capitals is the entablature and, over it, the vault, which houses a series of delicate stained glass windows. The main chapel contains two kneeling effigies of the Catholic King and Queen, Isabel and Ferdinand by Pedro de Mena y Medrano. The busts of Adam and Eve were made by Alonso Cano. The Chapel of the Trinity has a marvelous retablo with paintings by El Greco, Jusepe de Ribera and Alonso Cano.

The sacrarium, raised between 1706 and 1759, follows the classic proportions of the whole, keeping the multiple columns of the transept the shapes of the compound of Siloam.

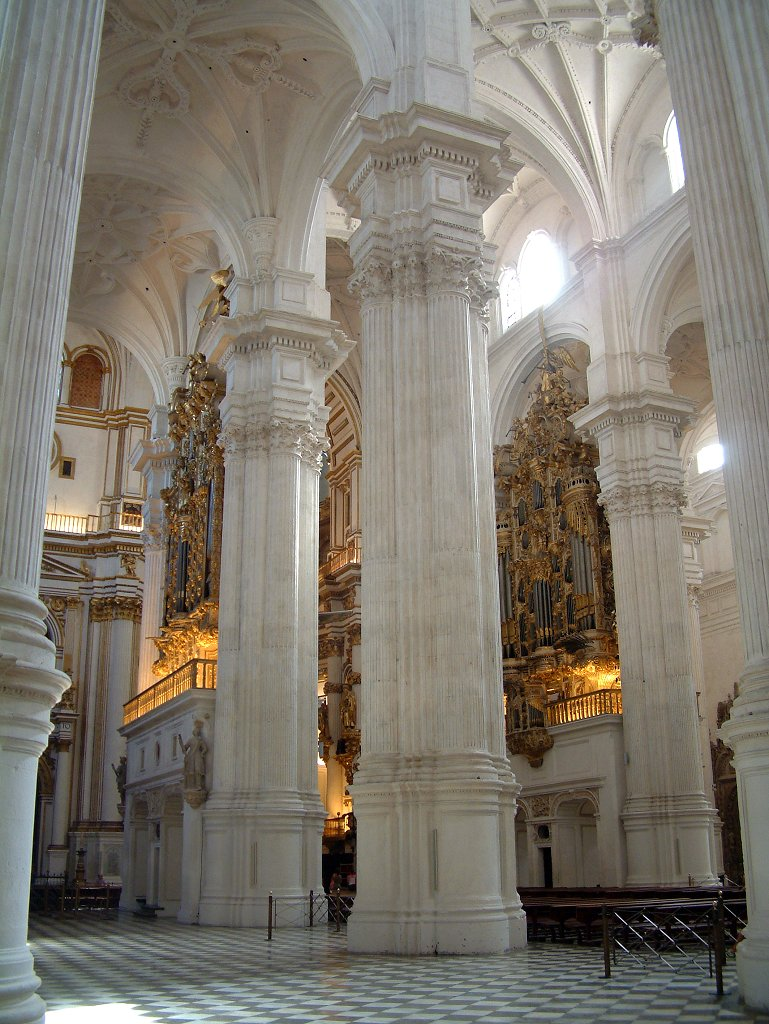
Both organs are visible here; the gospel organ is on the left

==== Organs ====
There are two organs built in the middle of the 18th century. The instruments face each other and the organ cases (described as late Baroque or Rococo) have nearly twin facades, but they sound different. The Epistle organ was restored in 2026 to reflect its original Baroque characteristics, whereas the Gospel organ has been modernised.

== See also ==
- Royal Chapel of Granada
- 16th-century Western domes
