= Rodrigo González de la Puebla =

Spanish diplomat (c. 1450–1509)

Dr Rodrigo González or Gonzalvo de la Puebla (c. 1450 – April 1509) was a Spanish lawyer and diplomat who served as ambassador to England in the late 15th and early 16th centuries. He spent a total of eighteen years in England (1487–1492 and 1495–1508). Alongside Gonzalo de Beteta and Gonzalo Fernández de Heredia (both ambassadors to the papal court), he is considered one of newly-unified Spain's first permanent ambassadors.

== Life ==
=== Early life and first embassy ===
Born in Toledo, to Juan González de la Puebla, he is thought to have come from a modest artisan family and possibly been a converso. He studied law, earning a doctorate in both civil and religious law. He gained renown for his accommodating, versatile, parsimonious, and methodical approach as a lawyer, which enabled him to become mayor and then magistrate of Écija. Later, he served as counsellor of Castile before being appointed ambassador to England in 1487.

Upon his arrival in London, his primary role was to negotiate the marriage of Catherine of Aragon, youngest daughter of Ferdinand II of Aragon and Isabella I of Castile, to Arthur, Prince of Wales, eldest son of Henry VII of England. Catherine was only two years old at the time, but an early betrothal was part of the Spanish royal family's long-term plan to secure a solid alliance with England. These negotiations proved successful, culminating in the Treaty of Medina del Campo signed on 27 March 1489, after which Diego de Guevara and Juan de Sepúlveda, who had accompanied de la Puebla to London, returned to Spain. Basing himself first in an Augustinian monastery and later near the Strand, de la Puebla also received instructions from Ferdinand to negotiate an alliance with James IV of Scotland and arrange for a marriage between the Scottish king and Joanna of Aragon (1455–1501), illegitimate daughter of Don Fernando. While the alliance was arranged, the marriage did not take place.

Despite proving a successful ambassador, he developed a reputation for being greedy and stingy. Accusations included living in poor housing and skimping on food costs, reportedly preferring invitations to dine at the English royal court. This earned him the enmity of Spanish merchants active in England, who reported him to his royal masters. Negative reports also came from de Puebla's colleagues Sancho de Londoño and the Dominican friar Tomás de Matienzo. His monthly salary was only 25 ducats, and he was still in debt at the time of his death. More serious allegations included being a 'servant of two masters' and holding dubious political allegiances.

=== Second embassy ===
In 1492, he was recalled to Spain to serve as ambassador to Catherine and John of Navarre, a post he held until 1494. He returned to London in mid-1495 to negotiate an alliance between Aragon, England, Maximilian I, and Pope Alexander VI. He engendered such confidence in Maximilian and Alexander that they both also granted him power to negotiate on their behalf on 15 November 1495 and 18 April 1496, respectively. However, suspicions from his previous time in London persisted in Aragon, leading to the dispatch of another joint ambassador to England and Scotland, Pedro de Ayala. He and de Puebla proved incompatible, leading to friction and fears from de Puebla that his role was being diminished. This intensified when Ferdinand and Isabella sent yet more emissaries to London: Gutierre Gómez de Fuensalida in 1500 and Hernán Duque de Estrada two years later. Fuensalida was even secretly granted the power to dismiss de Puebla as ambassador.

Following Catherine's widowhood, de Puebla began negotiations for her remarriage to Arthur's younger brother, the future Henry VIII of England. This was intended to maintain the Anglo-Spanish alliance and continue the isolation of France. Fuensalida intervened, and the marriage was delayed until 1508. Henry VII seems to have both criticised and praised de Puebla. In a letter to Don Fernando concerning a potential replacement for de Puebla, Henry praised the ambassador and recommended he either be made a bishop in England or married to a rich heiress. De Puebla himself, however, instead asked Henry for a life pension equal to his salary. His second embassy concluded on 21 June 1508 on Ferdinand's orders, delivered by Fuensalida, although de Puebla remained in England until his death in April the following year. His only child, Gonzalo, became chaplain to Charles V, Holy Roman Emperor.

== Depictions in popular culture ==
- The Six Wives of Henry VIII (1970) - Ken Wynne
- The Shadow of the Tower (1972) - John Bennett
- Princes in the Tower (2005) - Nicholas Rowe
- Six Tudor Queens. Katherine of Aragon The True Queen (2016) Alison Weir
- The White Princess (2017) - Philip Arditti
