= Pope Pius XI and Spain =

Foreign relations between Pope Pius XI and Spain were very tense, especially because they occurred within the context of the Spanish Civil War and the period of troubles preceding it.

== Anti-clerical government ==
The Republican government which came to power in Spain in 1931, as the country embraced constitutional democracy, following the fall of Miguel Primo de Rivera and the exit of the King, Alfonso XIII, seemed to signal that Spain was breaking with elements of its past. The Republican alliance took 45 of Spain's 52 provincial capitals. The Republican alliance perceived the religious question at this time as a matter of trying to define a new, subordinate place of the Catholic Church. Many of the constitutional articles were modeled on the Portuguese Constitution of 1911 – separation of church and state; freedom of worship became a fundamental civic right; civil marriage and divorce were introduced; schools and cemeteries were secularized. Catholic schools continued, but outside the state system, and in 1933 further legislation banned all religious sisters and male congregations from teaching. State education would be secular, obligatory, free of charge, and available to all. Also, the Jesuits were expelled from Spain.

Religion was to be placed in the private sphere, religious worship confined to religious buildings – the public world of the Republic was to be determinedly secular. Establishing a secular state was a fundamental tenet of Republicanism, but the alliance was 'a hybrid of traditions', encompassing liberals, radicals, federalists, anarchists – and there was less unanimity as to other anti-religious policies. The Socialist minister of justice Fernando de los Rios, argued that the deputies should not deprive communities of their traditional festivities and that processions like Holy Week in Seville or Corpus Christi in Toledo transcended a purely religious significance – but was ignored. At Pentecost in 1932, Pope Pius XI protested against these measures and demanded restitution. He asked the Catholics of Spain to fight with all legal means against the perceived injustices.

== Nationalization of Church properties ==
On 3 June 1933, Pius issued the encyclical Dilectissima Nobis, in which he described the expropriation of all Church buildings, episcopal residences, parish houses, seminaries and monasteries. By law, they were now property of the Spanish State, to which the Church had to pay rent and taxes in order to continuously use these properties. "Thus the Catholic Church is compelled to pay taxes on what was violently taken from her." Religious vestments, liturgical instruments, statues, pictures, vases, gems and similar objects necessary for worship were expropriated as well.

== Expropriation of private Catholic schools ==
The churches were not spared in the expropriation. Numerous churches and temples were destroyed by burning, after they were nationalized. Jesuits were prohibited from teaching. Private Catholic schools of Religious Orders and Congregations were expropriated, without regard to the free will of founders and benefactors. The purpose was to create solely secular schools.

== Beginning of the Civil War ==
The Civil War in Spain started in 1936, during which thousands of churches were destroyed and thirteen bishops and some 7000 clergy and religious Spaniards were assassinated. Another estimate is that in the course of the Red Terror, 6,832 members of the Catholic clergy were killed. Though many right-wing Catholics, including the majority of bishops, had always been opposed to the Republic and "bore a considerable responsibility for the growing friction that culminated in open warfare", the wave of persecution of religion that swept across the Republican zone, where the rebellion had failed, during the first months of the war, helped to assure "Franco of the highly useful support of the ecclesiastical establishment throughout the whole of the Civil War." (Isidro Gomá y Tomás, for example, handed money, collected from Ireland for the reconstruction of churches and replacement of liturgical articles, to Franco's rebel army.)

== The speech at Castelgandolfo, 14 September 1936 ==
In the first bloody months of the Civil War some ecclesiastics managed to escape to Marseille, Genoa, or Rome and these brought news reports with them, with which they sought to apply pressure to the organs of the Vatican Curia with whom they maintained regular relations. (Hilari Raguer, a Benedictine writer on religious history, points out that they necessarily delivered a biased report – bishops and aristocrats carry more weight than peasants and workers – and poor workers had no means of escape to take them from the Francoist zone to Rome). Father Ledóchowski, the superior general of the Jesuits, ordered the Jesuit press all over the world to support the rebels. It became known that Pius XI would grant an audience, at his summer residence at Castelgandolfo, to a large group of Spanish refugees and deliver an address to them. Expectation rose amongst the Spanish clergy in Rome. Though it should have fallen to Cardinal Francisco Vidal y Barraquer to lead the group of Spanish clergy, there was great animosity to him from the majority of Spanish ecclesiastics and the Pope instructed him to say he judged it wiser not to attend. Some 500 Spaniards, mostly priests and religious, as well as some secular supporters of the Uprising, did attend. The content of the speech disappointed the more fanatical among the supporters of the military rising. He read it in Italian and a Spanish translation was distributed as a leaflet. Entitled La vostra presenza (Your Presence Here), it began with lamentation for the fate of the victims and condemned communism. This part of the speech was used from this point on in Francoist propaganda. He quoted from the Book of Revelation, telling the refugees they came out of great tribulation (Rev 7:14). Yet whilst some hoped and expected that the Insurgent cause would be declared a Holy War or Crusade – it had already been so designated by various bishops and generals – Pius XI expressed horror at fratricidal war and exhorted the insurgents to love their enemies. He thanked those who had tried to alleviate the miseries of war, though their effect had been minimal. This too may have displeased the fervent supporters of Franco who were present, for the insurgents had always obstructed intervention of this kind by governments or neutral organisations such as the International Red Cross.

== Reactions to Pius XI's Castelgandolfo speech ==
Four days after the speech Eugenio Pacelli wrote to Vidal y Barraquer to say the Pope had wanted to comfort the refugees but not to identify himself with the warlike attitude of the side that called itself Catholic. In the so-called 'National' zone however, the Francoists widely publicized the speech – but only those paragraphs which seemed to endorse the idea of a Crusade, the second part being suppressed. The Spanish bishops acted upon the impulse suggested by the propagandist version of the speech and "let loose a cascade of Pastoral Letters in favour of Franco." So, for example, Enrique Pla y Deniel, the Bishop of Salamanca, on receiving a version of Pius XI's speech from the military, published his Pastoral Letter, Las Dos ciudades,(The Two cities), dated 30 September, an attempt at a theological justification for Franco's cause. The moral weight of the Vatican was considered of great significance to the generals of the Uprising – for one thing it was wanted at this time to aid the suppression of the separatist nationalisms in Spain. In 1936 it was Basque nationalism which particularly troubled the Francoists as it presented to the world the sight of Catholics who were loyal to the Republic and resisting with arms the invasion of the Crusaders.

== Magaz, Gomá, and Pius XI ==
The Holy See maintained relations with the Republic in 1936 – thereafter they grew weaker. Relations began with Burgos, the base of Franco's Nationalists, with the appointment of an unofficial Chargé. The Junta de Defensa at Burgos appointed a monarchist, Antonio de Magaz y Pers, the Marqués de Magaz to establish contact with the Vatican. Magaz had been ambassador to the Holy See in the late 1920s and had sought to enroll the assistance of Pius XI in the suppression of catalanismo and bizcaitarrismo (Catalan and Basque nationalism) – and the removal of Cardinal Vidal y Barraquer from the Primatial Archiepiscopal seat of Tarragona. Magaz did not succeed in removing the Catalan cardinal but did get decrees prohibiting the use of Catalan in pastoral matters and ordering the expulsion from the seminaries of all teachers and pupils suspected of separatism.

Magaz's second mission to the Vatican in 1936 lasted barely a year. He endlessly demanded the canonical condemnation of the Basque nationalists, who refused to surrender to the rebels. He made complaints and threats against what he called the neutralism of the Vatican in the face of a war of religion. Pius XI met Magaz in a papal audience on 23 November 1936. Pius had just received a report from the Bishop of Vitoria, Mateo Múgica Urresterazu, telling him how the Franco insurgents had expelled him from his seat and telling him that 14 priests of his diocese had been shot, and many more jailed or banished from their parishes. According to a report of J.A. Giménez Arnau, who asked Magaz about the audience, Magaz told him Pius XI replied to his complaints about the Vatican's attitude to the Nationalist authorities by declaring, "In the National Spain, priests are shot just as they are in the Spain of the other side." In another account, when Magaz said that the slight sympathy for the National government of the Pope's words caused him great distress, Pius XI was thrown into a fury and declared; "How can anyone dare to speak of our slight sympathy when on many different and public occasions we have condemned Communism and conferred our benevolence on those who fight it?" From that moment Magaz had condemned himself in the eyes of both the Vatican and Franco. Pius XI appointed Isidro Gomá y Tomás as his unofficial and confidential representative at Franco's headquarters, a role he performed from 19 December 1936 to 18 September 1937, while Monsignore Antoniutti, who had arrived in Spain in October 1936 on another mission, was named as the Papal Chargé d'Affaires. Goma's influence on the attitude of Pius XI was powerful. Having met with Eugenio Pacelli and Pius XI on December 19, 1936, Goma wrote in his diary; " the unfriendly attitude towards Spain was abandoned after my report to Pacelli had been read and a formula was found to create close ties with the government of Franco."

Gomá was a man of the Church, unlike Magaz, and suspicious of some of those surrounding Franco – an anti-clerical sector which could stain the perceived Christian spirit of the Franco movement. This anti-clerical sector he confronted in his Pastoral Letter of 28 January 1938, to mark the fourteenth anniversary of the coronation of Pius XI. In the third part, entitled 'Pius XI and Spain' he spoke of the Pope's love for Spain and in the fourth part, Prevengámonos ('Let us prevent'), he challenged those who attacked Pius XI for not intervening more determinedly in favour of the Francoist Uprising. In the fifth he confronted anti-Vatican sentiment in the Movement; "We have heard and read, 'Catholics, yes; Vaticanists, no'; and it is with pain that we have seen it expressed in more sophisticated terms by a section of the press." Franco, since 1 October 1936, had taken over all the powers of the junta and sought to gain the full support of Pius XI. The policy of Pius XI, which Gomá first and afterwards Antoniutti and Cicognani maintained, towards Franco's government, was characterised by a strong anticommunism on the one hand, and on the other a suspicion of falangism and of the influence of Franco's German Nazi and Italian Fascist allies; the Vatican policy sought to guide the regime into the repeal of the anti-clerical laws of the Republic and away from 'pagan' and imported totalitarian temptations. Gomá was received by Franco on 29 December 1936 and six basic points were established at the meeting – points that were the seeds of the Concordat of 1953.

== The Divini Redemptoris encyclical, March 1937 ==
Pius XI's 'third way' policy of neither communism nor fascism was illustrated by the publication in early 1937 of one encyclical against Communism and another against Nazism. Divini Redemptoris devoted a paragraph to "the horrors of communism in Spain", and dwelt on the assassination of priests and religious. In Franco's Spain this encyclical against Communism received wide circulation, but the publication of Mit brennender Sorge was prohibited. Franco told von Faupel, German Ambassador, that while Pius XI was recognised as the highest religious authority in Spain, any interference in internal Spanish affairs had to be rejected. He told the German ambassador that he too, Franco, had to fight against the Vatican. He had instructed the Archbishop of Toledo, Gomá, that no mention should be made in Spain of the encyclical Mit brennender Sorge and that in this way any criticism of Germany would be cut off.

In 1937 there was dual representation with the Salamanca government, raised to the level of Chargés d'Affaires, with Antoniutti at Salamanca and Churruca at Rome, and mention of the Valencia (Republican) government reduced to a line of dots in the Annuario Pontificio. By 1938 relations with Franco reached the level of full Ambassador and Nuncio.
