= Incumbent (ecclesiastical) =

Holder of a Church of England parochial charge

In English ecclesiastical law, the term incumbent refers to the holder of a Church of England parochial charge or benefice. The term "benefice" originally denoted a grant of land for life in return for services. In church law, the duties were spiritual ("spiritualities") and some form of assets to generate revenue (the "temporalities") were permanently linked to the duties to ensure the support of the office holder. Historically, once in possession of the benefice, the holder had lifelong tenure unless he failed to provide the required minimum of spiritual services or committed a moral offence. With the passing of the "Pastoral Measure 1968" and subsequent legislation, this no longer applies, and many ancient benefices have been joined into a single new one.

At one time, an incumbent might choose to enjoy the income of the benefice and appoint an assistant curate to discharge all the spiritual duties of the office at a lesser salary. This was a breach of the canons of 1604, but the abuse was only brought under control with the passing in 1838 of the Pluralities Act (1&2 Victoria, ch. 106), which required residence unless the diocesan bishop granted a licence for non-residence for reasons specified in the same act and provided severe penalties for non-compliance.

== Official title ==
The incumbent's official title might be that of rector, vicar, "curate-in-charge" or "perpetual curate". The difference between these titles is now largely historical. Originally, an incumbent was either a rector who received all the tithes or a vicar who received only the small tithes (see Impropriation). Curate-in-charge and perpetual curate were later legal terms to meet the case when new parishes were created or chapels of ease established which were not supported by tithes.

In the Episcopal Church of the United States, a rector is usually the incumbent of a self-supporting church, while a Vicar is the incumbent of a church that requires financial subsidy from the diocese.

== Nomination and admission into office ==
The future incumbent is either nominated by the ordinary (normally the diocesan bishop) or the patron who owns the advowson. Originally, the parish concerned had no legal voice in the matter, but modern legislation established the need for consultation to take place.

The form of admission to office has two parts: the future incumbent is first authorised by the bishop to exercise the spiritual responsibilities (institution or collation – see below), the second puts him in possession of the "temporalities" (induction) which he receives at the hands of the archdeacon or his deputy. The two actions are often combined into one ceremony and the canons require the bishop to use his best endeavour to perform the ceremony in the parish church. However, this is not legally essential.

=== Collation and institution ===
The difference between collation and institution resides in the fact that when a patron presents a cleric for institution the bishop may examine the cleric and refuse on good grounds to proceed. A negative decision may be contested in the courts and the Gorham Controversy was a case in point. If the bishop himself or herself has chosen the cleric, this is unnecessary and the legal formalities are different. The bishop admits the incumbent to the spiritualities of the benefice by reading a written instrument bearing his or her episcopal seal committing the care or "cure" of souls to the priest who kneels before him or her while this is done and holds the seal.

=== Induction ===
The bishop then instructs the archdeacon by Letters Mandatory for Induction to induct the priest into the temporalities of the benefice. This must be performed in the church and is done by placing the hand of the priest on the key or ring of the door and reciting a formula of words. The priest advertises his or her induction by tolling the church bell. Induction is a vestige of the medieval legal practice of livery of seisin.

== Temporalities ==
Legally, the incumbent is a corporation sole i.e. "a legal entity vested in an individual and his successors by reason of his office" and any particular occupant had the right to receive the income and make use of its assets to support him in his ministry. Traditionally, these were the tithes, the glebe, fees, the parsonage house plus the church where his responsibilities were shared with the churchwardens, and if he was a rector, he had to finance the maintenance of the chancel from his own resources.

During a vacancy, the temporalities were normally administered by the churchwardens, who could disburse monies to cover the costs of providing spiritual attention and other legally recognized expenses until the new incumbent entered, when they had to pay any balance in hand over to him.
