= Holy See–Spain relations =

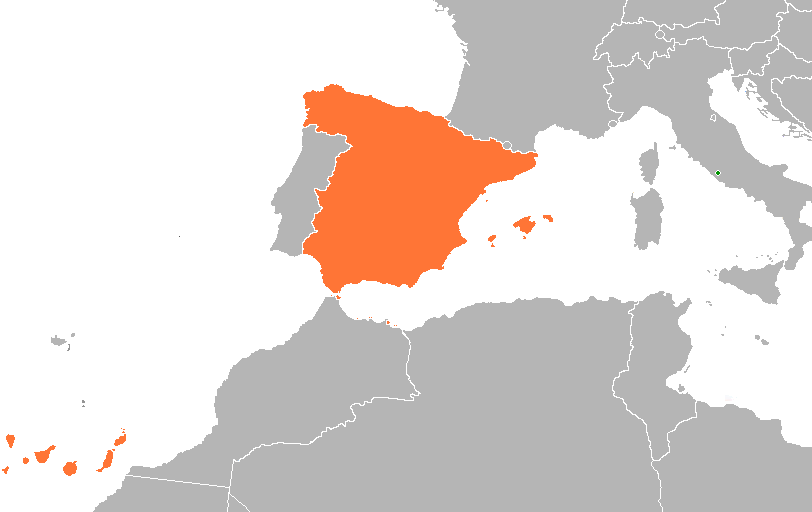
- Holy See: Spain

Holy See–Spain relations are foreign relations between the Holy See and Spain. Both countries established diplomatic relations in 1480. This is the oldest permanent diplomatic mission in history. The Holy See has a nunciature in Madrid. Spain has an embassy in Rome.

== History ==
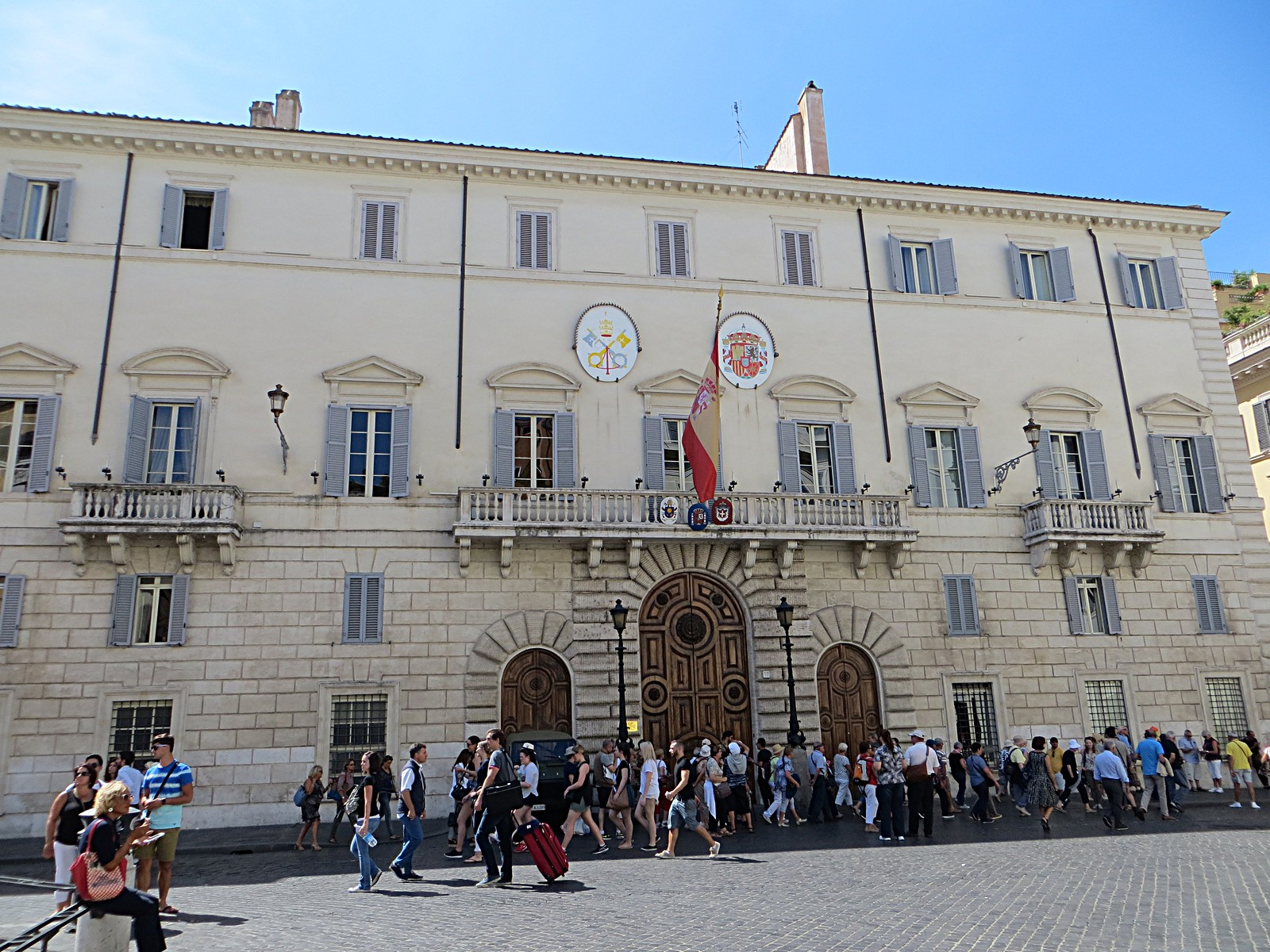
Embassy of Spain to the Holy See in Rome

The Spanish Inquisition was an ecclesiastical tribunal started in 1478 by Catholic Monarchs Ferdinand II of Aragon and Isabella I of Castile for the newly united Kingdom of Spain. It was intended to maintain Catholic orthodoxy in their kingdoms, and to replace the medieval inquisition, which was under Vatican control. Spain's diplomatic mission in Rome grew out of the Inquisition as well as out of the exploration of the New World. The first Spanish ambassador to Rome, Gonzalo de Beteta, was appointed in 1480, thus establishing the oldest permanent diplomatic mission in the history of the world.

The mission resulted in important projects of cooperation between the two states. These included Vatican support for the Granada War, the partition of the New World between Spain and Portugal via the "Bula Inter Caetera" in 1493 (see Treaty of Tordesillas), and the creation of the Holy League, which led to a key victory for Christendom at the Battle of Lepanto.

For most of the reign of Pope Alexander VI (1492-1503), the Church had its own diplomatic representation in Spain. The Holy See's embassy was renewed in 1506 by Pope Julius II.

=== Ecclesiastical confiscations of Mendizábal ===
The ecclesiastical confiscations of Mendizábal, which occurred between 1835 and 1837, were a set of decrees which resulted in the expropriation and privatisation of monastic properties in Spain. Pope Gregory XVI gave an account of events from his perspective in an allocution to Catholic church leaders in Rome on 1 February 1836, lamenting the passage of the legislation and explaining his decision to withdraw Luigi Amat di San Filippo e Sorso, titular Archbishop of Nicaea, from his role in Spain as papal representative. Gregory maintained this position, with a further allocution to Cardinals gathered in consistory on 1 March 1841. Gregory refers in 1842 to a "proposed law" which would aim to "abolish ... legitimate ecclesiastical authority" and to adopt what he called "the detestable principle that the secular power, by its full right, should have predominance over the Church itself and its goods".

=== After 1978 ===
After the new Spanish Constitution was adopted in 1978, the constitution set forth the principle of Separation of Church and State, although the state continued to fund public schools run by the Catholic Church.

The relations of the Holy See with the recent Zapatero's PSOE government were strained because of legislation allowing for same-sex marriage and liberalisation of abortion, the end of religious education in public schools, and general political support for secularism. The government expressed an esteem for the heritage of the Spanish Republicans of the 19th and 20th centuries, many of whom were strongly anticlerical, especially during the Spanish Civil War. It also questioned the role of the Spanish monarchy in national politics.

This contrasts with previous Spanish administrations, many of which had been keen on promoting Spain's historic Catholic culture and identity, such as under Francisco Franco, for example. Relations were also good under Partido Popular (PP)'s Jose Maria Aznar and Mariano Rajoy.

== Resident diplomatic missions ==
- Holy See has an Apostolic Nunciature in Madrid.
- Spain has an embassy to the Holy See in Rome (Italy).

== See also ==
- Foreign relations of the Holy See
- Foreign relations of Spain
- Apostolic Nuncio to Spain
- Pope Pius XI and Spain
