= Temporalities =

Non-religious possessions and properties of a church

Temporalities (bona temporalia, from Latin tempus, "time", plural: temporalia or temporalien, "temporal goods") are the secular properties and possessions of the Catholic Church. The term is most often used to describe those properties (a Stift in German or sticht in Dutch) that were used to support a bishop or other religious person or establishment. Its opposite are spiritualities.

== History ==
In the Middle Ages, the temporalities were usually those lands that were held by a bishop and used to support him. The distinction between "temporals" and "spirituals" emerged during the Investiture Crisis, as a way to resolve conflicts over ecclesiastical authority. This separation of secular and spiritual responsibilities within church offices was formalized in the Concordat of Worms. According to its conditions, the temporalities of a diocese were granted to the bishop by the secular ruler after the bishop was consecrated.

If a bishop within the Holy Roman Empire had gained secular overlordship to his temporalities imperially recognised as an imperial state, then the temporalities were usually called a Hochstift, or an Erzstift (for an archbishop). Sometimes, this granting of the temporalities could take some time. Other times, a bishop-elect gained his temporalities even before or without his papal confirmation by an imperial act called "liege indult" (Lehnsindult). The temporalities were often confiscated by secular rulers to punish bishops.

Temporalities that involved sovereign or governmental authority were effectively abolished during Germany's secularization. What remained was largely converted into state-funded benefits, with their scope defined by concordats and circumscription bulls.

In the context of the Catholic Church's disputes with the Spanish government during the nineteenth century, Pope Gregory XIV reiterated the Church's "innate right to acquire and possess temporal goods" (nativo diritto la facoltà di acquistare e possedere beni temporali) in an address to the consistory in 1841.

The Second Vatican Council referred to temporal goods as church property and also the property of clergy to the extent that they need earthly goods in order to survive and develop, not withstanding their call to voluntary poverty. Clergy were directed only to use temporal goods "toward ends which are licit according to the doctrine of Christ and the direction of the Church", such purposes being "the carrying out of divine worship, ... the procuring of honest sustenance for the clergy, and ... the exercise of the works of the holy apostolate or works of charity, especially in behalf of the needy".

== See also ==
- Post-medieval parish temporalities in England
