= Esteban de Bilbao Eguía =

Spanish politician

The Most Excellent The Marquess of Bilbao Eguía
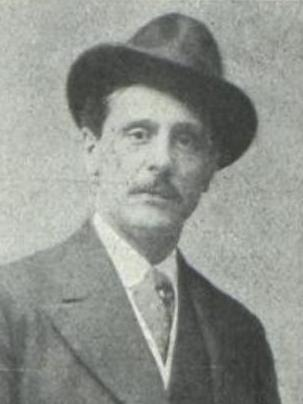
- Pictured in 1916

President of the Cortes
- In office 16 March 1943 – 29 September 1965
- Preceded by: Diego Martínez Barrio as president of the Republican Courts (1936-1939)
- Succeeded by: Antonio Iturmendi Bañales

Minister of Justice
- In office 9 August 1939 – 16 March 1943
- Preceded by: Tomás Domínguez Arévalo
- Succeeded by: Eduardo Aunós

Personal details
- Born: Esteban de Bilbao Eguía; 11 January 1879 Bilbao, Spain
- Died: 23 September 1970 (aged 91) Durango, Spain
- Party: Comunión Tradicionalista, Falange Espanola Tradicionalista
- Occupation: lawyer, politician

Esteban de Bilbao Eguía, 1st Marquess of Bilbao Eguía (11 January 1879 – 23 September 1970), was a Spanish politician during the dictatorship of Francisco Franco.

== Family and youth ==
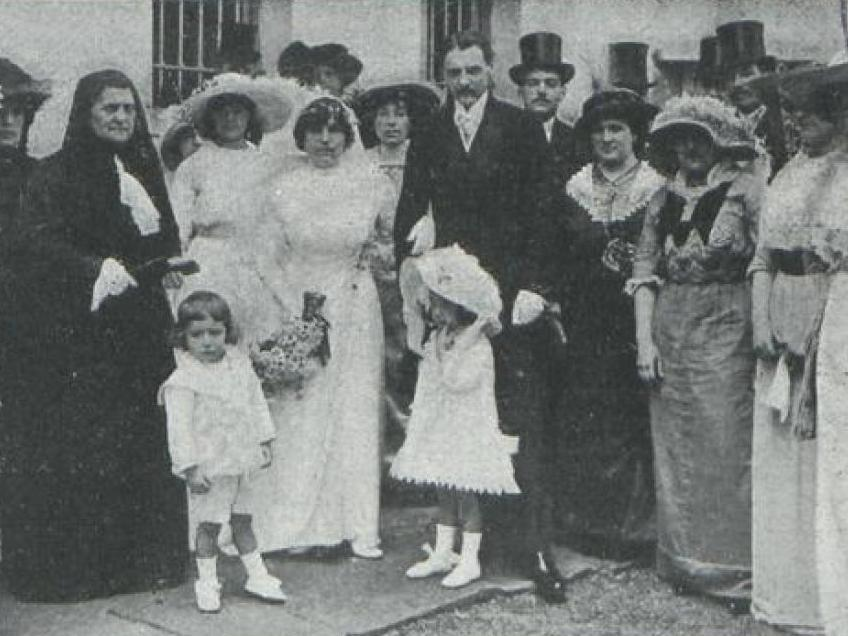
Bilbao's wedding, 1913

Esteban Martín Higinio de Bilbao Eguía was born into a Basque middle-class bourgeoisie family. His paternal grandfather, Manuel Bilbao, ran a merchant business in his native town of Guernica in Biscay province. One of Manuel's sons became a presbyter, while another, Hilario Bilbao Ortúzar, moved to Bilbao and practiced as a physician. Hilario married María Concepción Matea de Eguía Galindez, a descendant of a distinguished and widely branched Biscay family. The couple had six children, with Esteban All of the Bilbao Eguía children were raised in a fervently Catholic environment, though none of the sources consulted provides any information on the political preferences of their parents.

The young Esteban was first educated at the Instituto Provincial, the local state-run secondary school in Bilbao. Sources provide varying details of his exact academic path, though most agree that he studied law and philosophy, initially at the Jesuit University of Deusto in Bilbao, later moving to the prestigious Universidad de Salamanca, where he completed both curricula. Bilbao crowned his academic career by earning a PhD in law from the Universidad Central of Madrid. After returning to his native Biscay, he opened a law office and, in 1904, was registered as a practicing abogado (lawyer) in Bilbao. In 1913, he married María de Uribasterra e Ibarrondo (1891–1976). The couple had no children.

== Early public activity ==
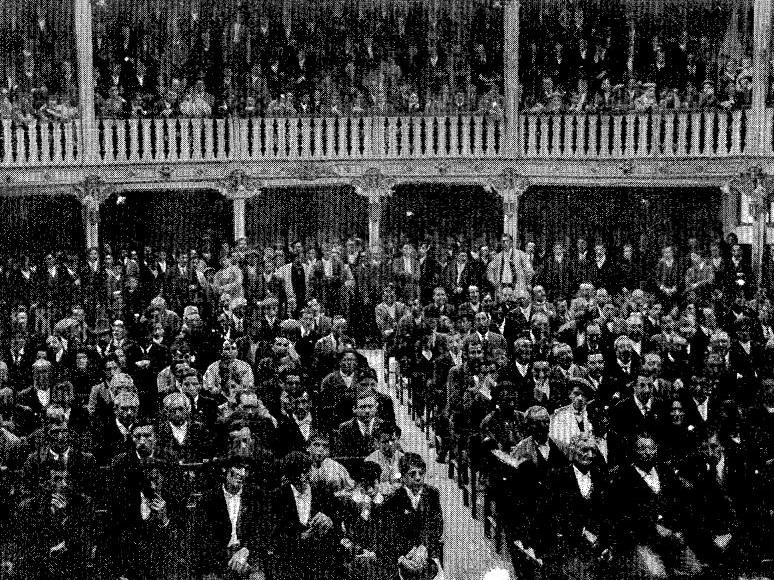
Carlists listening to Bilbao speak

It is unclear whether Bilbao inherited his Carlist outlook from his forefathers or whether he embraced it during his academic years. By 1902, he was already firmly established in the local Biscay structures of mainstream Carlism, and alongside national figures like Juan Vázquez de Mella, he toured the province, organizing meetings and delivering speeches. In 1904, he ran as a Carlist candidate in the elections for the Bilbao City Council and was successful; some sources suggest that he was later appointed as teniente de alcalde (deputy mayor). When he objected to the presence of a Protestant minister at an official municipal event, the government charged him with breaching the constitution and canceled his mandate.

In his pursuit of Catholic militancy against the increasing secularization promoted by Madrid governments, Bilbao played a pivotal role in the Biscay branch of Juventud Católica. He also actively participated in various other local Catholic initiatives, such as representing Carlism at public meetings opposing secular schools. His activities reached their peak at the turn of the decade during the public uproar caused by the so-called Ley del Candado. As a member of the Biscay Junta Católica, he took part in countless gatherings and events, the most notable being the Acto de Zumárraga in 1910. Some of his speeches skirted the edge of legality, leading to him being tried three times, though the outcomes of these trials are unknown.

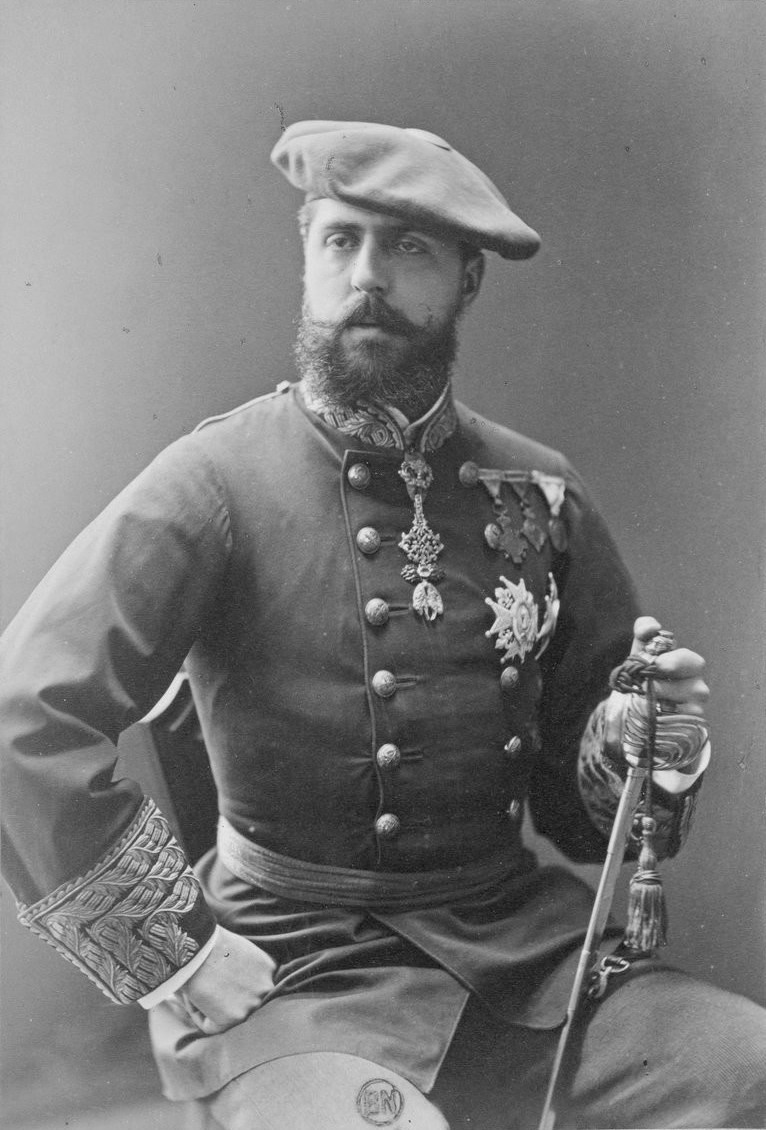
Carlos VII

Within the Traditionalist ranks, Bilbao, along with fellow Deusto students Victor Pradera and Julio Urquijo, formed a new generation of activists. They were promoted by the claimant Carlos VII and the party leader, Marqués de Cerralbo, in their effort to build a modern Carlist network. In 1907, Bilbao was fielded as the official party candidate to the Cortes from the Álavese district of Vitoria. His debut turned into a fratricidal conflict, as another Carlist, Enrique Ortiz de Zarate, ran with the backing of the youth and a more militant electorate; as a result, both Carlists lost. In 1910, there were rumors that Bilbao would replace Vázquez de Mella as the Jaimist candidate in Pamplona, Navarre, but in the end, it was the latter who stood and won. In the subsequent 1914 campaign, Bilbao ran in his native Biscay, in Durango, but lost again, this time to the conservative candidate José de Amézola y Aspizua. The loss led to riots between supporters of both candidates.

Bilbao embraced Basque identity in the Carlist tradition, viewing local provincial fueros and ethnic identity as indispensable elements of the broader Spanish political nation. He participated in the first Congreso de Estudios Vascos, where he had the honor of delivering the closing address. In his speech, he expressed solidarity with the persecuted "madre Euskal Herria" and advocated for the establishment of a Basque university to lead the "restauración cultural vasca" (Basque cultural restoration). He remained active in subsequent congresses until the late 1920s, playing a vital role in its Sección de Estudios Sociales. His interest in social issues extended beyond the Basque realm, as evidenced by his publication of the leaflet "La cuestión social."

== Cortes and Asamblea Nacional ==
After unsuccessful electoral campaigns in Álava, Navarre, and Biscay, Bilbao competed in 1916 in the Carlist national stronghold, the Gipuzkoan district of Tolosa. He defeated the conservative candidate and became part of the 9-member Jaimist minority in the Cortes. In 1918, he ran again in the same district and was re-elected. Known for his active defense of the Church, religion, and Traditionalism, Bilbao distinguished himself as one of the most notable Carlist orators, though some critics described his style as having a penchant for purple rhetoric.

During the Mellista crisis, Bilbao remained loyal to the successive claimant, Don Jaime, and worked closely with him, even editing some of his proclamations and documents. As the secession decimated the Jaimist ranks, Bilbao became the local Biscay jefe. In 1919, he was fielded as the provincial Jaimist candidate for the Senate. Elected, he remained active, focusing on syndical laws and the autonomous status of universities. It is unclear why he abandoned his senatorial position in 1920 to run for the Cortes again, but this time, he returned to Navarre and was elected from another Carlist stronghold, the Estella district. In 1923, during the last parliamentary campaign of the Restoration, the Carlist king ordered abstention, and no official candidates were fielded.

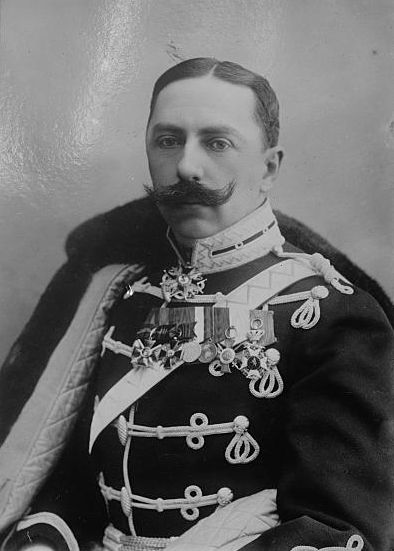
Don Jaime

Though most Carlists initially welcomed the Primo de Rivera coup, viewing it as a stepping stone toward a traditionalist, anti-democratic monarchy, their sympathy soon waned. Don Jaime eventually instructed his followers not to participate in the primoderiverista institutions. However, Bilbao ignored this directive and became one of the most vocal advocates of the dictatorship. In 1924, he joined the new state party, Unión Patriótica. By 1926, he was appointed president of the Diputación de Bizkaia, a position he held for four years, during which he worked to negotiate the provincial concierto económico. In 1927, he joined the newly appointed quasi-parliament, the Asamblea Nacional Consultiva as a representative of the diputaciones provinciales.

It is unclear which of these actions was the final straw, but Don Jaime and his political representative in Spain, Marqués de Villores, remained firm and expelled Bilbao from the Carlist ranks. Despite this, Bilbao retained his Carlist identity and aligned himself with the Mellista branch of Traditionalism.

He also remained active as a Catholic politician, heading the Biscay section of Acción Católica from the early 1920s. He later participated in the first national congress and delivered an address. In 1929, he attempted to launch a new Catholic political grouping, but the initiative failed to gain traction, receiving only a lukewarm reception from the primate Segura. During the Dictablanda period, Bilbao reached out to the orphaned monarchist primoderiveristas from Unión Monárquica Nacional, speaking at their public meetings.

== Republic ==
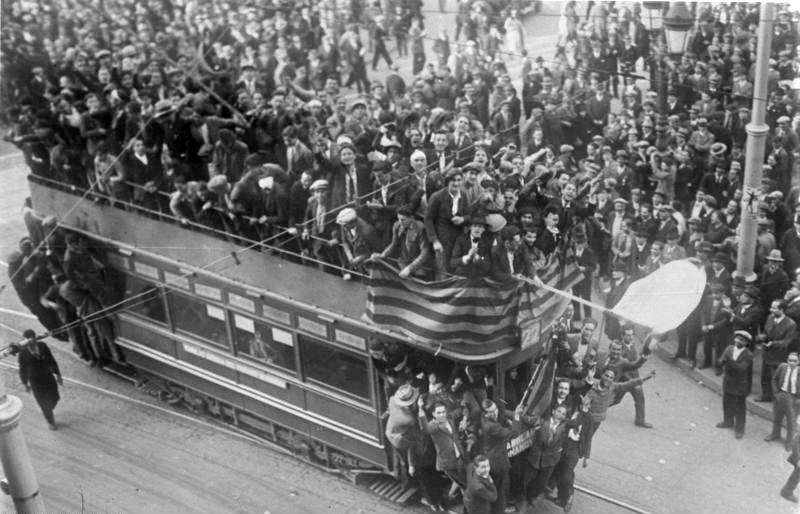
Republic declared, 1931

Sources provide contradictory information about Bilbao's relations with mainstream Carlism after the fall of the monarchy. Some authors claim that, although many Carlists believed the rise of the militantly secular Republic necessitated the unification of various Traditionalist branches, Bilbao was not enthusiastic about returning under Don Jaime's command. Other scholars argue that by April 1931, he had already edited the claimant's proclamation, which instructed the Carlists to help maintain order and stay vigilant against the threat of foreign-inspired tyranny. Additionally, there are conflicting reports that in late 1931 and early 1932, Bilbao attempted to broker a failed dynastic agreement with the deposed Alfonso XIII.

Following the unexpected death of Don Jaime, Bilbao resolved any doubts he might have had and, alongside Pradera, led the Mellistas into the united Carlist organization, Comunión Tradicionalista. He became the head of its Biscay section and joined the national Junta Suprema. He established a close working relationship with the new claimant, Don Alfonso Carlos, co-editing several of his proclamations and documents, including those that seemed to confirm the late Don Jaime's policy of opening dynastic negotiations with the Alfonsinos. Bilbao himself was inclined towards a dynastic pact and is listed as one of the so-called "transaccionistas." He engaged in the monarchist alliance and contributed to Acción Española. Some sources claim he joined the manifesto launching a new broad alliance, Bloque Nacional, while other authors maintain that he was one of the few leaders who did not sign it.

From the outset, Bilbao contributed to the Carlist military buildup. In the summer of 1931, he was in touch with the Comité de Acción Jaimista, an organization established to gather vigilantes for protecting religious buildings. He agreed to join the monarchist military junta, to be led by General Emilio Barrera. In October 1931, he was briefly detained and, in early 1932, was sentenced to two months of exile in Navia de Suarna (Lugo province). He was at least aware of, and possibly involved in, the Sanjurjo coup, although the authorities did not identify him as complicit. His opposition to the dissolution of the Jesuit order and the enforcement of secular schools led to further detentions and two court trials.

In 1933, Bilbao resumed his parliamentary duties as a Carlist deputy from Navarre. He later defended the traditional Navarrese fueros, although he opposed the autonomy of Catalonia. That same year, alongside other party figures like Jesús Comín, he joined the 18-member Council of Culture. Although the council had little power, it brought together Carlists of different origins and bolstered the new leadership of Manuel Fal Conde. In 1935, Bilbao reached the highest level of the Carlist executive when he joined the 5-member Council of the Comunión. Within the already militant and fervently anti-Republican Traditionalist camp, Bilbao led an even more hawkish faction. He refused to stand in the 1936 elections due to his self-proclaimed hatred of parliamentarism.

== Civil War ==
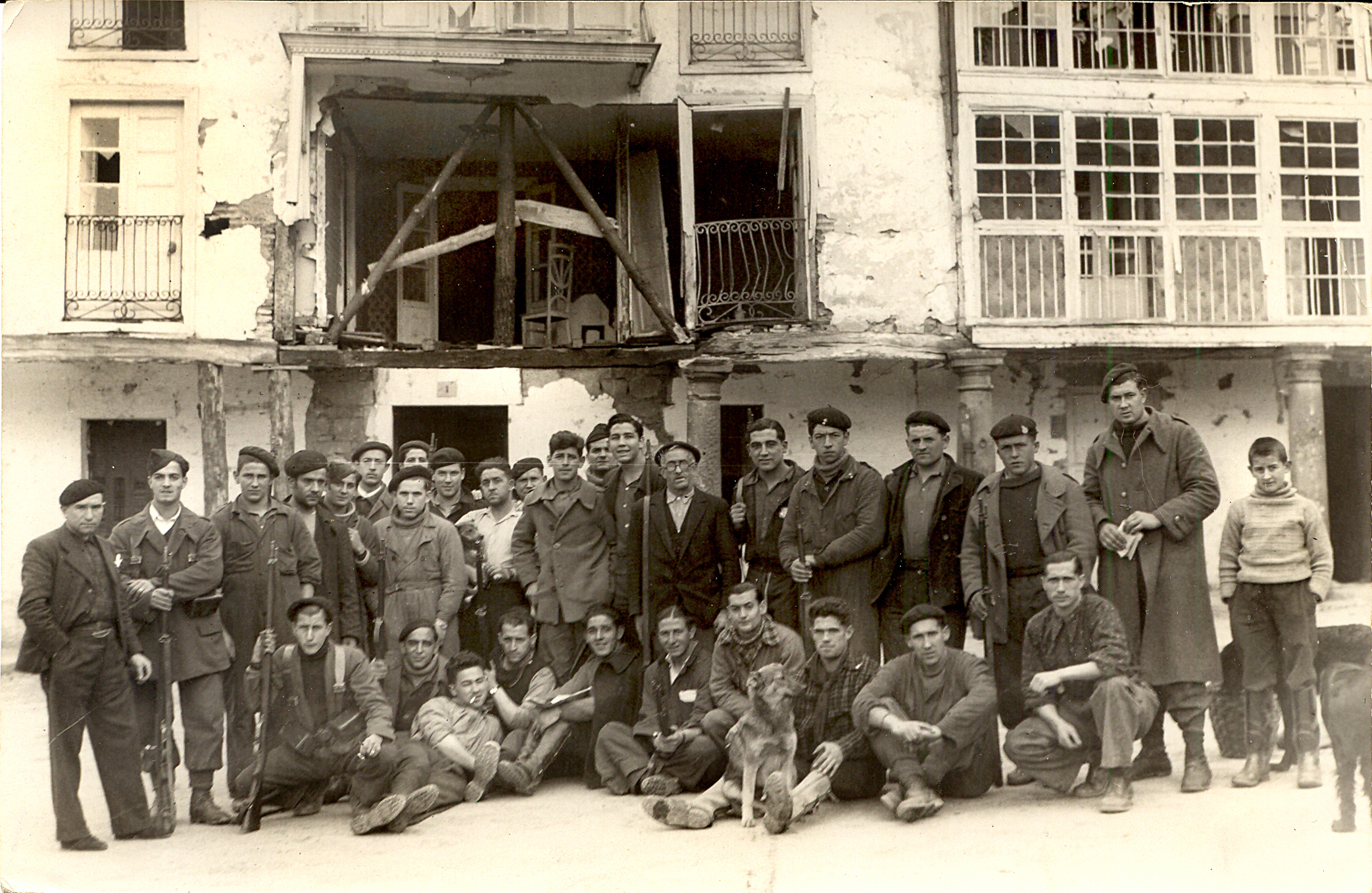
Basque republican militia

It is unclear how Bilbao contributed to the military conspiracy or what his position was in the Carlist debates regarding their involvement in the rebellion. During the July 1936 coup, he was at his summer home in Durango. Detained by the Basque authorities on the Altunamendi ship, he was exchanged in late September for the Bilbao mayor, Ernesto Ercoreca, thanks largely to the efforts of Marcel Junod. He then made his way via France to the Nationalist zone. Bilbao joined the Junta Nacional Carlista de Guerra and was appointed a member of its Sección Política, settling near the Cuartel General del Generalísimo in Salamanca.

Starting in late 1936, Carlism was increasingly paralyzed by its unclear governing structure and political indecision, especially when faced with pressure from Franco and his chief aide, Ramón Serrano Suñer. As a member of the Carlist executive, Bilbao participated in some meetings in early 1937, which were called to discuss the looming threat of amalgamation into a future state party. During the Insua gathering, he was not under the illusion that the new regime would resemble the mild dictatorship of Primo de Rivera; he seemed aware of Franco's centralist, anti-regionalist agenda and warned against a "gobierno definitivo de tipo falangista" and a regime that was "fuerte, dictatorial y cesarista." Despite this, he tended to hesitantly accept the perspective of unification, albeit against the intransigent faction of Fal. The semi-rebellious Carlist body, the Junta Central Carlista de Guerra de Navarra, pursued an appeasement strategy and tried to assume a leading role within the movement by suggesting a reorganization of Carlism, with Bilbao proposed to lead its Sección Política. However, these plans were ultimately thwarted as Franco pressed for action and soon declared his Unification Decree.

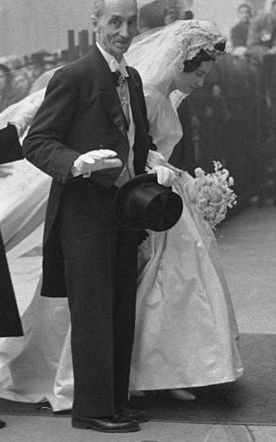
Don Javier

Faced with a choice between compliance with Rodezno and the intransigence of Fal, Bilbao aligned himself with Francoist unification and joined the newly established FET. Although he was not among the four Carlists who entered the first 10-member Secretariado of the party, in October 1937, he was nominated as one of 12 Traditionalists to the entirely decorative 50-member National Council of the Movement. Despite vehement objections from Fal Conde, Bilbao remained steadfast and, in December 1937, the new regent-claimant Don Javier and Fal agreed to expel him from the Comunión. With all bridges burned, and following the transformation of the Secretariat into the Junta Politica, Bilbao emerged as one of the two top-positioned Carlists in the regime, becoming a member of the Junta in October 1939. He had little, if any, influence on the emerging party, as its Estatuto and internal structures were designed by Serrano, who—together with his Falangist entourage—became Bilbao’s chief opponent. Bilbao rather excelled as a speaker, mobilizing support at public events in Vascongadas.

== Minister of Justice ==
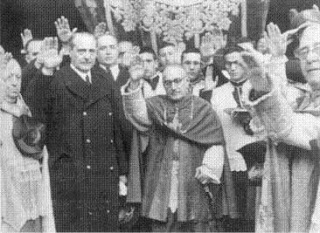
Minister of Justice Estaban Bilbao (left), accompanied by Archbishop of Toledo Enrique Pla y Deniel (center), doing the Fascist salute in March 1942.

In 1938, Bilbao became president of the Comisión de Codificación within the Francoist Ministry of Justice and began working on the development of the Francoist legal code. When his fellow Carlist, Conde Rodezno, left the ministerial position, Bilbao replaced him in August 1939 and held the post until 1943. As Minister of Justice, he presided over one of the most repressive legal systems in modern Europe.

In terms of judicial executions, early Francoist Spain surpassed Nazi Germany and was second only to the Soviet regime. The number of death penalties handed down in the few years following the Civil War was 51,000, though nearly half were commuted by Franco, resulting in approximately 28,000 executions. When Bilbao assumed the ministry, he oversaw the greatest single wave of incarcerations, increasing the number of political prisoners from 100,000 at the end of the Civil War to 270,000 by the end of 1939. In the following years, this number decreased steadily due to a series of amnesties, and by the time he left the ministry, he admitted to 75,000 political prisoners. Meanwhile, thousands of these prisoners died in overcrowded prisons. Although labor camps remained under military control, his ministry provided juridical assistance, resulting in about 90,000 people working under atrocious conditions in penal detachments. The brutality of the system even shocked Heinrich Himmler.

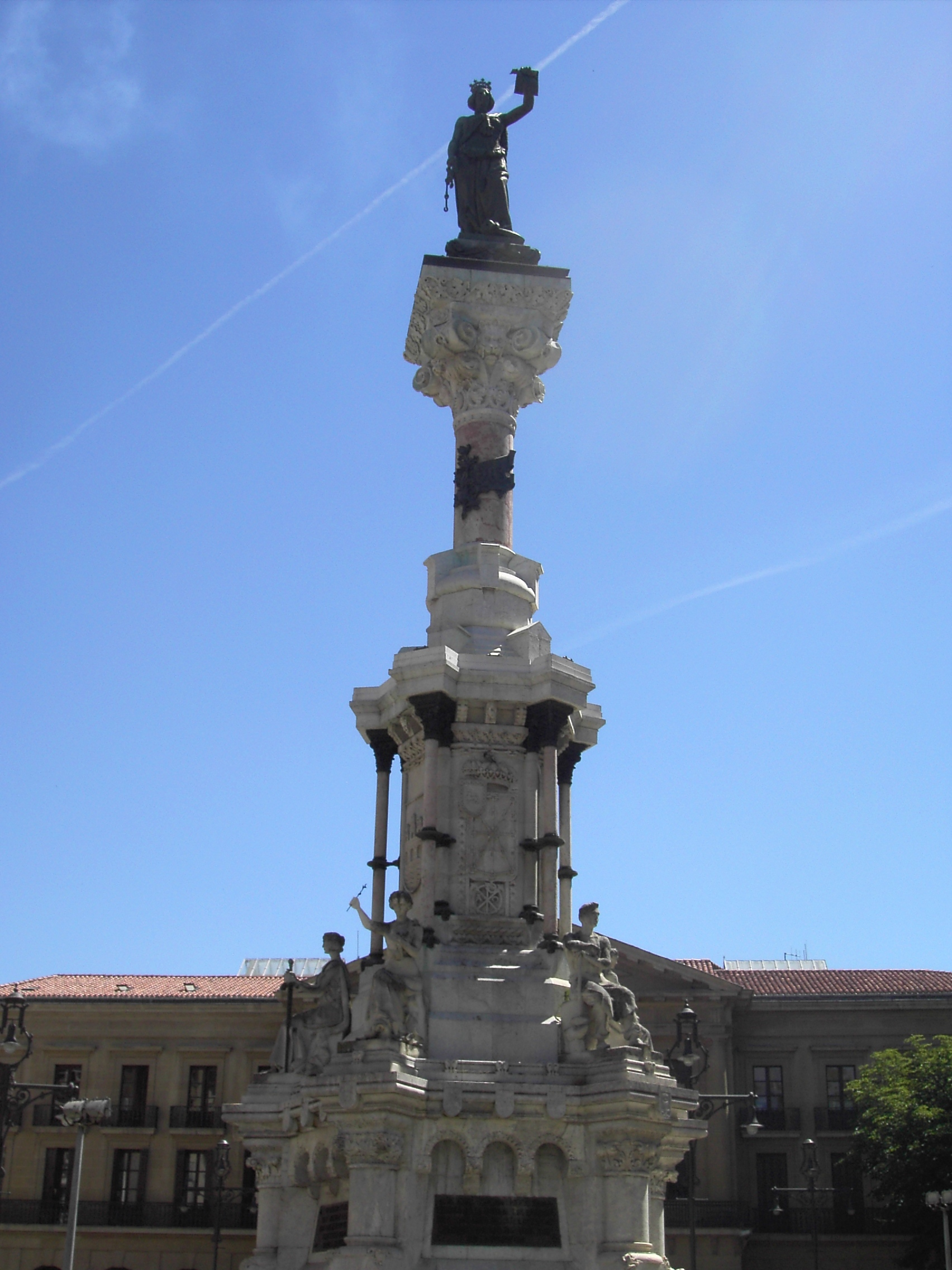
fueros monument

Bilbao coordinated work on the Francoist repressive legislation, including its cornerstones: the Ley de Responsabilidades Políticas (1939), the Ley de Represión de la Masonería y Communismo (1940), and the Ley de Seguridad del Estado (1941). He developed the appropriate juridical organization, such as establishing the Tribunal Especial para la Represión de la Masonería y el Comunismo. As minister, he contributed to the legal framework for the so-called niños robados, the Patronato Central de Redención de Penas por el Trabajo (which covered approximately 10,500 children in 1943), and the Patronato de Protección a la Mujer. Under his guidance, the divorce and marriage legislation of the Republic was retroactively reversed.

While Bilbao defended local fueros as head of the Biscay Diputación during Primo de Rivera's dictatorship, there is no information about his stance on the Francoist political penalties applied to Biscay and Gipuzkoa, which were labeled "provincias traidoras" and stripped of any remnants of separate local establishments, including the concierto económico. However, Bilbao claimed to have defended the Navarrese fueros and to have prevented efforts by the Ministry of Economy to impose homogenization measures on the province.

== Dignitary ==
As Minister of Justice and the regime's top lawyer, Bilbao shaped the Ley Constitutiva de las Cortes (1942). According to this law, he was entitled—both as a member of the Consejo Nacional and as a minister—to enter the Cortes Españolas when the Francoist quasi-parliament first assembled in 1943. To balance various political groupings, Franco awarded the speaker role to the Carlists and handpicked Bilbao for the position. He held this role for 22 years, serving in 1946, 1949, 1952, 1955, 1958, 1961, and 1964, until he resigned in 1965 due to his age. During his tenure, approximately 4,000 laws were adopted. As Presidente de las Cortes, Bilbao held one of the most prestigious positions in Francoist Spain, though it carried very little political power. As one of the top Carlists within the regime, he was expected to represent Traditionalist roots and a broad political adherence to the regime.

Having served for 35 years in the Restauración parliament, the Primo de Rivera Asamblea Nacional, the Republican Cortes, and the Francoist Cortes Españolas, Bilbao remains the longest-serving Spanish deputy of the 20th century and one of the longest-serving Spanish MPs ever. His first and last days in the chamber spanned 49 years, a record in Spanish parliamentary history.

In 1947, Bilbao was a key author of the Ley de Sucesión, the law that officially established Spain as a monarchy and created a vague pathway for royal restoration while simultaneously solidifying Franco's rule as Jefe de Estado. This law was protested by both Alfonsist and Carlist claimants, Don Juan and Don Javier. According to the law, Bilbao, by virtue of his role as parliament speaker, entered two newly established bodies: the Consejo del Reino and the Consejo de Regencia.

The Consejo del Reino, a unique diarchic structure for an authoritarian monarchy proposed earlier by Primo de Rivera, was designed as a special deputy to the executive. It was meant to assist the Head of State on matters within his exclusive competence and was presided over by Bilbao. The Consejo de Regencia, composed of three officials, was intended to act as an interim regency during the transition to Franco's successor or in his absence. The Consejo de Regencia functioned for only nine days in October 1949, during Franco's one and only foreign trip after the Civil War.

== Relations with Falangism ==
Falangist standard

During his 30 years of activity within the Francoist regime, Bilbao maintained a perfectly loyal stance. He is credited with coining the royally-sounding phrase "Francisco Franco, Caudillo de España por la gracia de Dios." There is no evidence that he participated in any conspiracy, opposition, or protest against Franco personally. His political efforts were primarily focused on keeping the hardline Falangists at bay, occasionally combined with a rather timid advocacy of the monarchist idea.

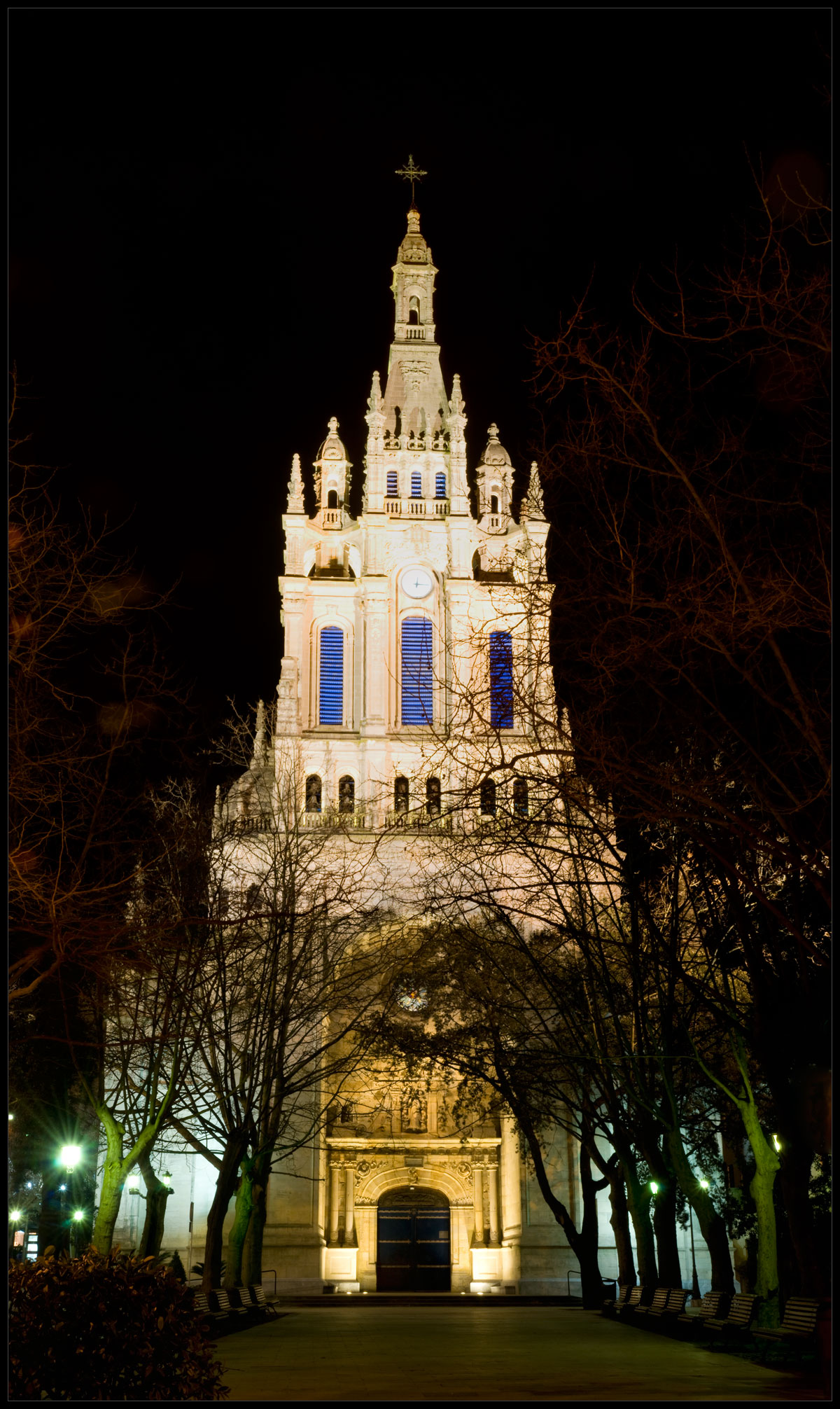
Basilica of Begoña

In the summer of 1940, Ramón Serrano Suñer proposed the Ley de Organización del Estado, a draft aimed at giving Falange a central role in the totalitarian new structure. This plan elicited a letter of protest from Bilbao, who denounced the "systematic interjection of the party" into state organs. The dissent was shared by most monarchists and parts of the army, leading to the shelving of the project and an evolution of the Francoist system along more hybrid lines.

Discontent between the Falange diehards and the monarchists prompted Bilbao to resign as a minister in early August 1942. However, he changed his mind after receiving a flattering letter from Franco. Shortly thereafter, the Begoña incident led to a showdown between the Carlists and the Falangists, with General Varela demanding that Falange be brought into line and the process of monarchy restoration begin. Bilbao supported Varela, but Franco outmaneuvered the dissidents, convincing them to comply. This standoff eventually led to the sidelining of Serrano and a de-emphasis of Falangism.

The last major confrontation between syndicalist hardliners and monarchists occurred in late 1956. Bilbao compared Arrese's draft of the Leyes Fundamentales to "Soviet totalitarianism" and led a coalition of monarchists, the Catholic hierarchy, and the military against the project. The confrontation resulted in a cabinet reshuffle, the sidelining of Arrese, and a shift in power to the technocrats.

Due to his age, Bilbao became a somewhat decorative figure starting in the late 1950s. In 1965, he resigned from all political functions, citing his declining years. As a private retiree, he could afford more frankness, and as late as 1969, he publicly expressed a barely veiled lack of enthusiasm for the perceived Falangist domination in the Cortes, both during his presidency and afterward.

== Relations with Carlism ==
Carlist standard

Following his expulsion from the Comunión, Bilbao's relations with mainstream Carlism were reduced to nil. When, in late 1942, the Carlists abandoned any hopes of preserving their identity within the FET, Fal Conde declared that those previously expelled might be readmitted provided they sever any links with Falange. However, Bilbao was explicitly excluded from this scheme.

Lambasted by mainstream Carlists as a double traitor who had already abandoned Don Jaime in the 1920s, Bilbao even faced minor snubs in the Cortes. He did not join the Reclamación del poder, a protest letter signed by the Javieristas and delivered to Franco in 1943.

Though Don Javier counted Bilbao among the "camaradas" of the treacherous Rodezno, Bilbao did not follow Rodezno's approach of aligning with Don Juan as the legitimate Carlist claimant. Instead, in 1943, together with other Traditionalists like Joaquín Bau, Iturmendi, and del Burgo, he re-launched the candidacy of Archduke Karl Pius of Austria, Prince of Tuscany, styled as Carlos VIII. Within the limits permitted by the Francoist regime, he cautiously supported Carloctavismo until the claimant's unexpected death in 1953.

When, in the mid-1950s, Carlism shifted its strategy from opposition to cautious collaboration with Francoism, the distance between Bilbao and the party diminished. The new generation of Carlist activists, particularly the young anti-Traditionalist entourage of Don Javier's son, Carlos Hugo, sought to use Bilbao in their bid for power. Despite despising him as a traitor, in 1959 they invited him to join the Junta Directiva Central, a front-office organization supporting their semi-political initiatives, such as Círculos Culturales Vázquez de Mella and the periodical Azada y asta.

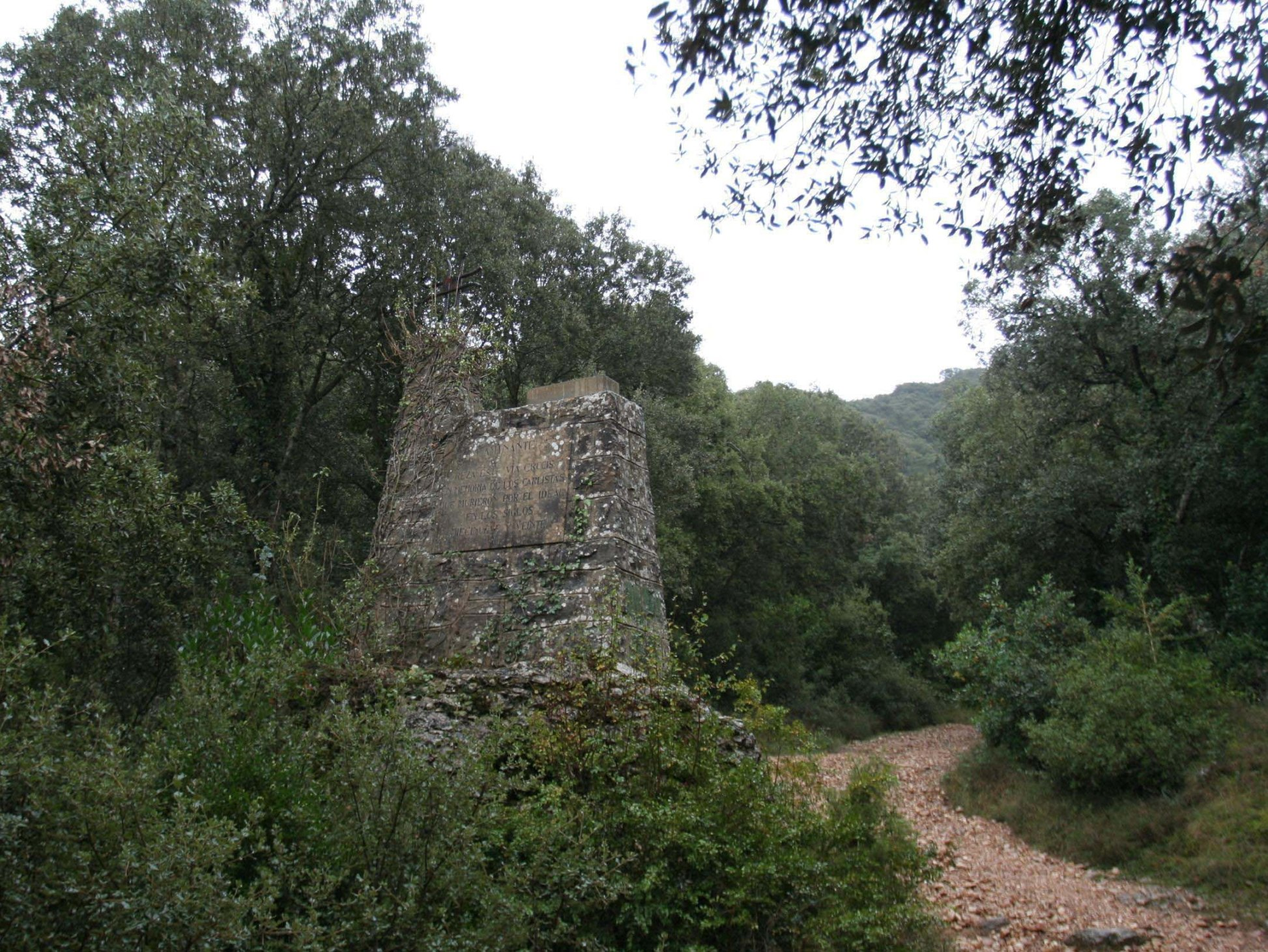
Montejurra, Carlist Via Crucis

Most likely, the senile Bilbao was unaware of the power struggle already prevalent within Carlism, where reactionary Traditionalists were confronted by the socialist Progressists. In 1963, as the Cortes speaker, he sent a greeting telegram to the Carlist annual gathering at Montejurra, which at the time served as a key event in the Huguista bid for power and as a promotional stage for Carlos Hugo himself.

Already a political retiree and faced with the prospect of Juan Carlos being declared the future king, in 1969 Bilbao remarked that it would not be intelligent to stumble twice over the same stone. A year before his death, he voiced support for Don Javier. The only notable Carlist present at his funeral was José Luis Zamanillo.

== Other, reception and legacy ==
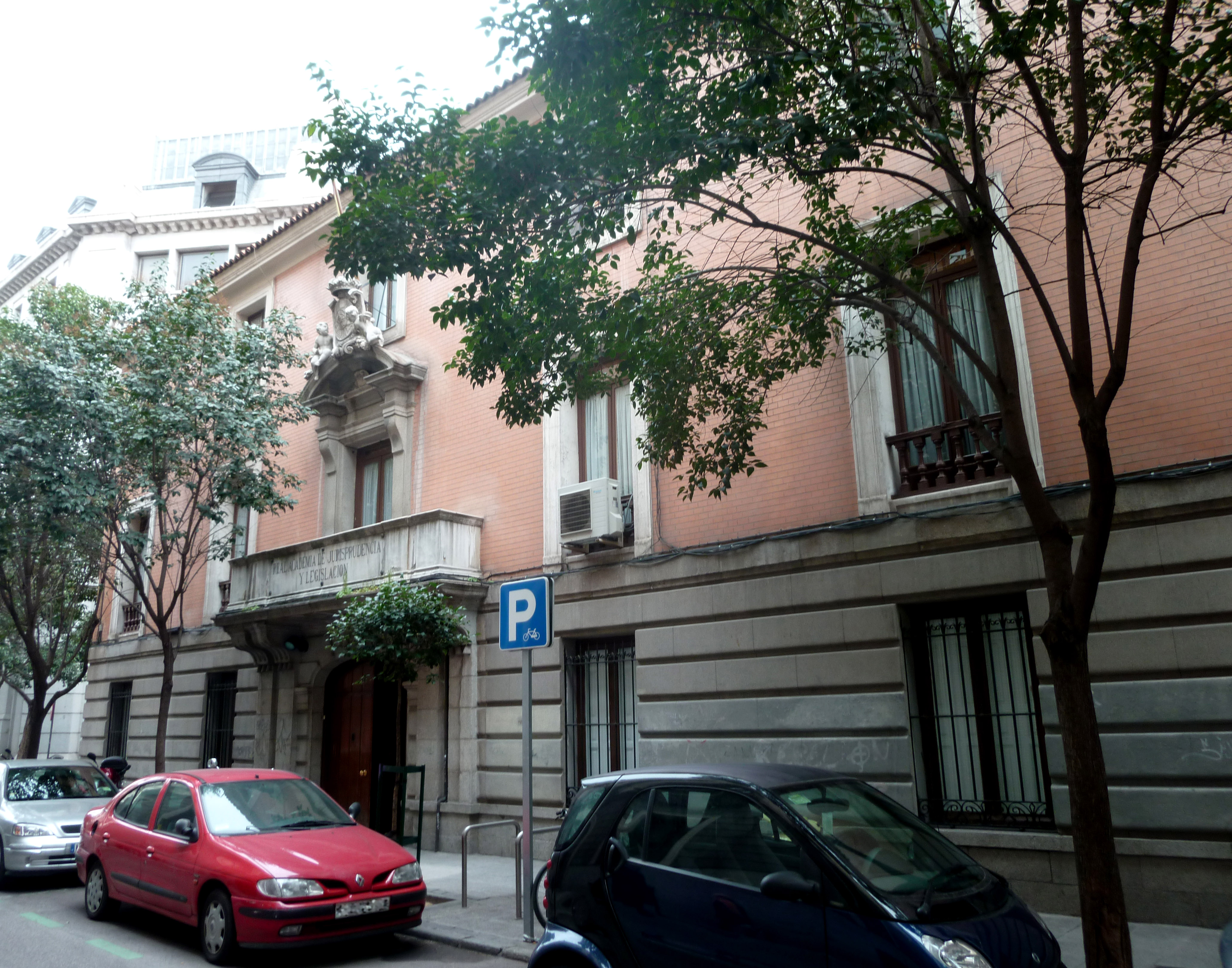
Academia de Jurisprudencia site

Bilbao was a member of several juridical bodies, including the Real Academia de Jurisprudencia, which he led from 1946; the Real Academia de Ciencias Morales y Políticas; and the Sección de Ciencias Jurídicas de la Academia de Bilbao. Although he did not pursue an academic career, Bilbao served as a temporary professor of law at the Universidad Libre de Vizcaya. He also presided over the Asociación de Antiguos Alumnos de la Universidad de Deusto. In 1947, he was awarded the title of Hijo Predilecto by the Bilbao Ayuntamiento and the title of Hijo Benemérito by the Diputación de Vizcaya. In 1955, he was named honorary mayor of Durango.

Though not widely recognized as a theorist or author, Bilbao wrote several works spanning various fields. His publications include history (e.g., La cuestión social [Aparisi y Guijarro, 1941]), philosophy of law (La idea del orden como fundamento de una filosofía política, 1945), history of law (Jaime Balmes y el pensamiento filosófico actual, 1949), and theory of law (La idea de la justicia y singularmente de la justicia social, 1949; De la persona individual como sujeto primario en el Derecho Público, 1949; De las teorías relativistas y su oposición a la idea del derecho romano, 1953). He also contributed to various newspapers and periodicals, including Diario de Navarra, El Fuerista, El Diario Vasco, El Pueblo Vasco, El Correo Español, La Gaceta del Norte, El Pensamiento Navarro, and El Día.

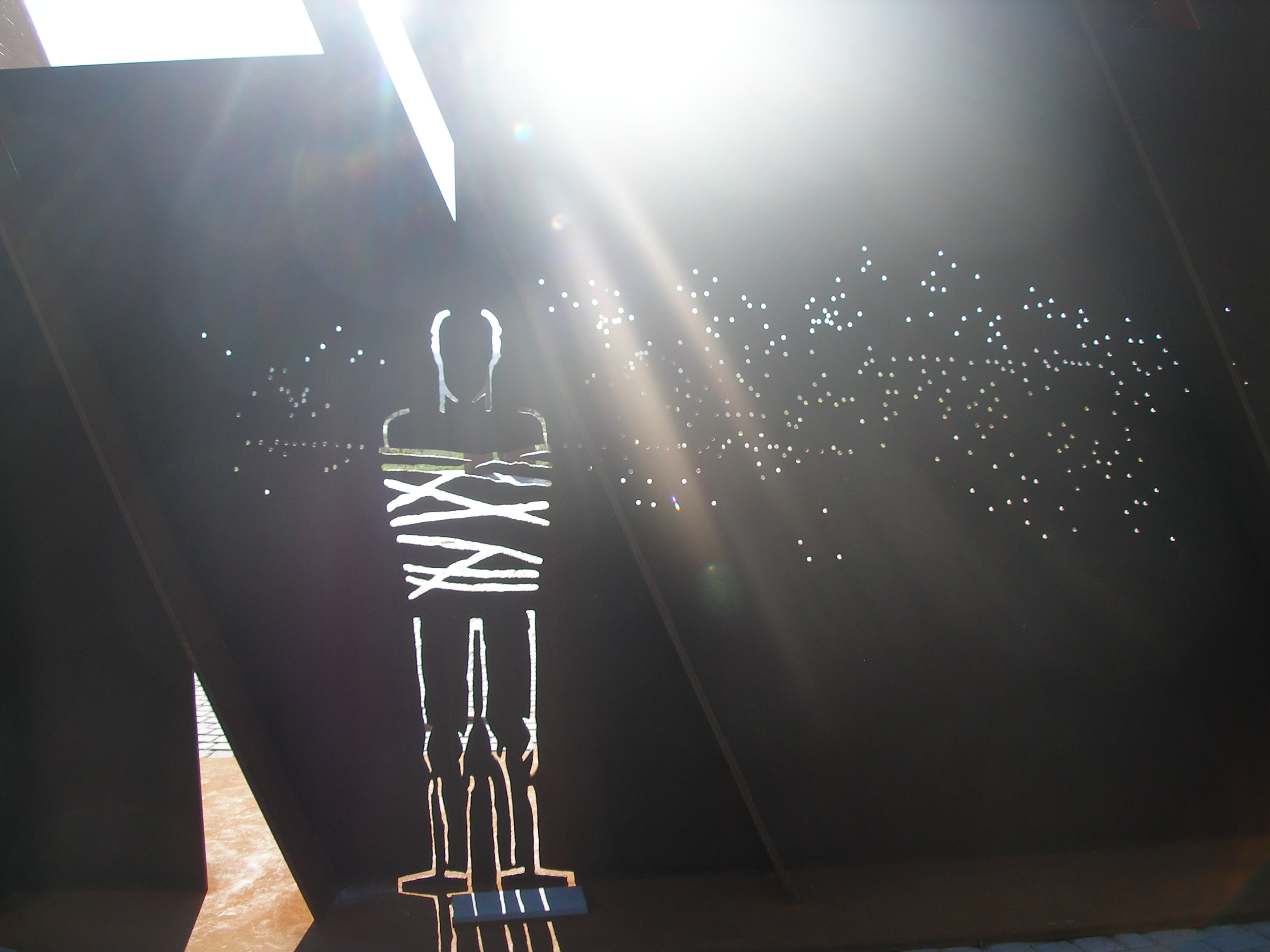
memorial to victims of Francoism

Bilbao was awarded the Gran Cruz de la Orden de Isabel la Católica and decorated with the Gran Cruz de Carlos III, Gran Cruz del Mérito Naval, Cruz Meritísima de San Raimunde do Peñafort, and Gran Cruz de la Orden Plana. In 1961, he was granted the title of Marquess of Bilbao Eguía (es: Marqués de Bilbao Eguía), which passed to his brother, Hilario, upon his death. In 2006, the Audiencia Naciónal, the Spanish high court, attempted to formally acknowledge Bilbao as guilty of crimes against humanity. However, due to procedural issues, this initiative did not succeed. In contemporary Spanish public discourse, he is sometimes referred to favorably as "Vasco de leyenda" or neutrally as "en cierto modo el espécimen del político vasco ultraconservador." More frequently, he is highly criticized as "franquista" or "fascista." Leftist political groups have called for his portrait to be removed from the Spanish Cortes, where it is currently displayed. To date, Bilbao has not been the subject of a full-scale biography or any smaller work.

== See also ==
- Electoral Carlism (Restoration)
- Carlo-francoism
