= Isidro Gomá y Tomás =

Catholic cardinal

His Eminence Isidro Gomá y Tomás
- Archbishop of Toledo
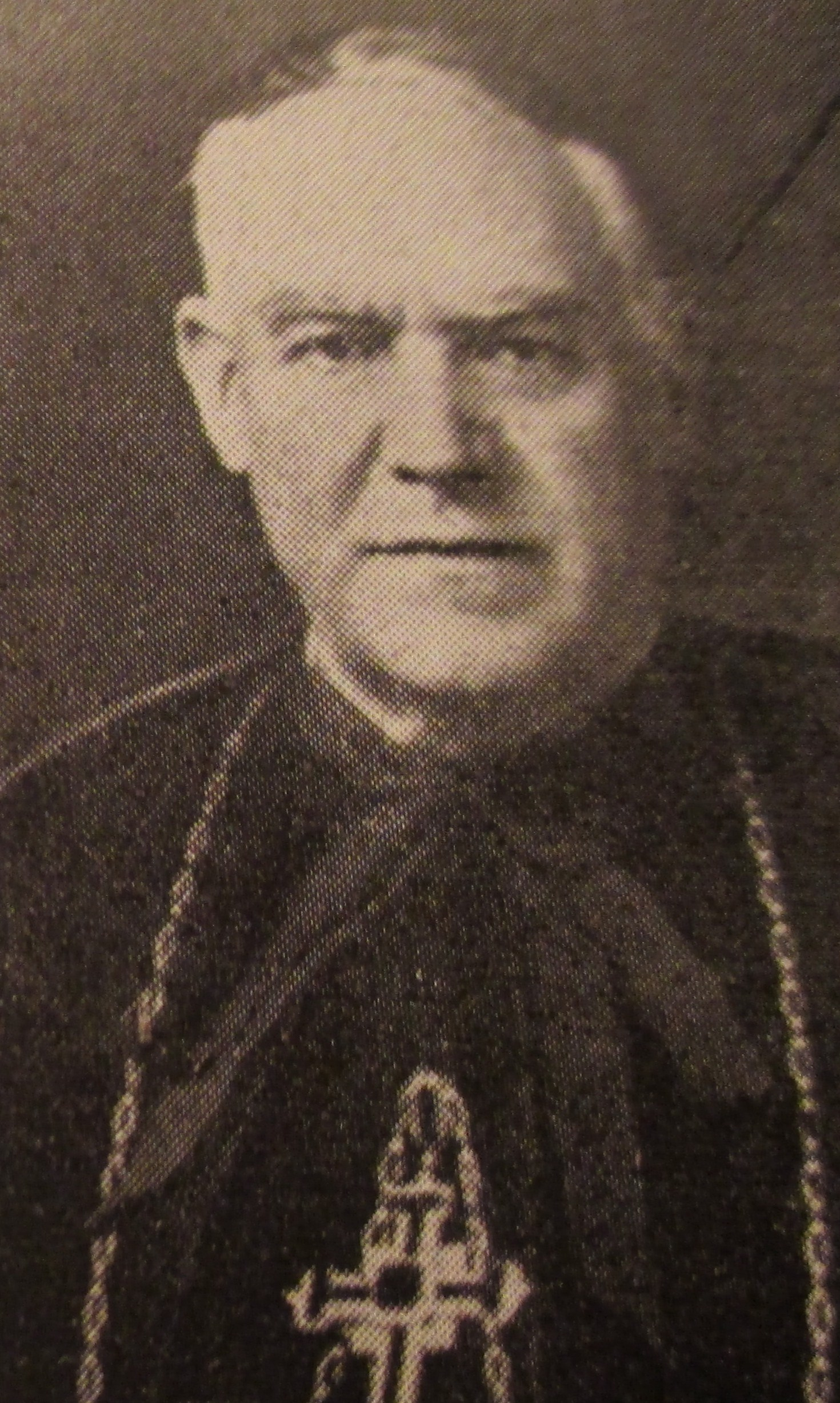
- Archdiocese: Toledo
- See: Toledo
- Appointed: 12 April 1933
- Term ended: 22 August 1940
- Predecessor: Pedro Segura y Sáenz
- Successor: Enrique Pla y Deniel
- Other post: Cardinal-Priest of San Pietro in Montorio (1935–40)
- Previous posts: Bishop of Tarazona (1927–33); Apostolic Administrator of Tudela (1927–33)

Orders
- Ordination: 8 June 1895 by Tomás Costa y Fornaguera
- Consecration: 2 October 1927 by Francisco de Asís Vidal y Barraquer
- Created cardinal: 16 December 1935 by Pope Pius XI
- Rank: Cardinal-Priest

Personal details
- Born: Isidro Gomá y Tomás; 19 August 1869 La Riba, Tarragona, Spanish Kingdom
- Died: 22 August 1940 (aged 71) Toledo, Francoist Spain
- Buried: Toledo Cathedral
- Parents: José Tomás Pedrol; María Tomás Bosch
- Education: University of Valencia
- Motto: Ut Ecclesia aedificationem accipiat
- Coat of arms: Isidro Gomá y Tomás's coat of arms

Styles of Isidro Gomá y Tomás
- Reference style: His Eminence
- Spoken style: Your Eminence
- Informal style: Cardinal
- See: Toledo

Isidro Gomá y Tomás (19 August 1869 – 22 August 1940) was the Bishop of Tarazona in the Province of Zaragoza and was known for his strong support of Francisco Franco and the National Movement during the Spanish Civil War (1936–1939). He was later made Cardinal and Archbishop of Toledo and was Primate of Spain.

Gomá was an integrista in the technical sense in believing in the necessity of a confessional state that imposes upon all its subjects the profession and practice of the Roman Catholic religion and prohibits all others.

At the end of the war, he wrote; "The Church has applied the full weight of her prestige, which has been placed at the service of truth and justice, to bring about the triumph of the National Cause."

== Early life ==
Isidro Gomá y Tomás was born in the town of La Riba, Spain, and grew up in a Catholic family. He was educated at the Seminary of Tarragona and the Seminary of Valencia.

== Priesthood ==
Isidro Gomá y Tomas was ordained as priest on 8 June 1895 in Tarragona at the age of 26. He quickly gained recognition for his theological skills and devotion to his faith. He did pastoral work in the Archdiocese of Tarragona until 1897 and then worked as a faculty member of the Pontifical Seminary of Tarragona from 1897 to 1899, where he taught philosophy and theology. Gomá was a parish priest in his home community and ran a ministry there that was focused on the traditional values of the Catholic Church. He served as its rector until 1906.

He worked in the diocesan curia until 1927. Throughout his priesthood, Gomá was heavily influenced by the teachings of Popes Pius X and Pope Pius XI, who stressed the importance of a strong moral foundation and the good it can bring to society. Gomá's devotion to his faith and commitment to his spirituality led him to his later success. His priesthood was the stepping stone to his final position as archbishop and shaped his approach to his leadership in later life, when he became one of the time's most memorable bishops.

== Episcopate ==
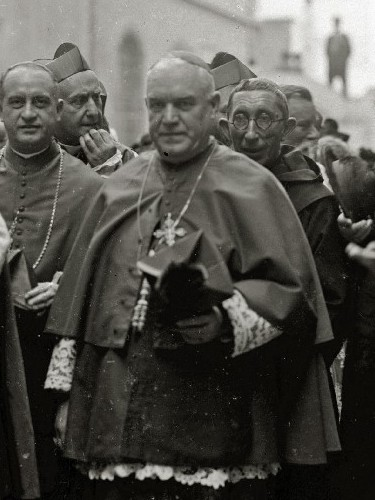
Isidro Gomá in 1930.

Gomá was appointed as bishop of Tarazona on 20 June 1927 by Pius XI, who was the head of the Catholic Church from 1922 to 1939 and highlighted the importance of social justice. After spending some years in Tarazona, Gomá was appointed as apostolic administrator of Tudela from December 1927 to June 1933. He played a very important role in guiding ministry even during a time of stress and change as Spain, which faced political instability. He was promoted to the metropolitan and primatial see of Toledo on 12 April 1933. He became the most powerful priest in the country and the spiritual leader of the Catholic population.

His traditional Catholic values were at the forefront of his leadership. Gomá strongly oppsed any non-religious beliefs. During his time as Archbishop of Toledo, he strove to promote Catholic beliefs across the country. He gave his best efforts to increase religion despite the Spanish Republic's reforms, especially those that tried to limit the influence of the church in daily life.

== Cardinalate ==
Gomá was created Cardinal-Priest of San Pietro in Montorio in the consistory of 16 December 1935 by Pius XI. Gomá participated in the conclave of 1939, which elected Pope Pius XII. Gomá died on 9 April 1940.

However, Spain then underwent much commotion because of the Spanish Civil War, which greatly stressed Gomá, who was in charge of protecting his diocese. During the war, which broke out on July 17, 1936, between the left-wing Republicans and the right-wing Nationalists, led by Francisco Franco and his National Movement, Gomá firmly sided with the Nationalist faction. His beliefs were religious but also deeply political. He supported Franco's vision for Spain, which included the establishment of a nationalist, Catholic and traditionalist state that would uphold the teachings of the Church and suppress any ideologies that threatened the established social order. That vision aligned with Gomá's belief that Spain should remain a confessional state, where Catholicism would be the state religion, with any deviation from it being suppressed. Gomá became "an intermediary between the Nationalist government, the Vatican, and the Spanish clergy and bishops, among others."

In 1938, when it was evident that the Nationalists had the upper hand in the war, Gomá made it clear that reconciliation was not forthcoming and contributed to the fervor of White Terror: "Indeed, it is necessary to end the war. But do not let it end with a compromise, with an agreement nor with reconciliation. It is necessary to take hostilities to the point of achieving victory at the point of a sword. Let the reds surrender, since they have been beaten. There is no pacification possible other than through arms. In order to organise peace within a Christian constitution it is vital to uproot all the rot of secular legislation".

Antony Beevor, a British writer claimed:

Cardinal Gomá stated that 'Jews and Masons poisoned the national soul with absurd doctrine'... A few brave priests put their lives at risk by criticizing nationalist atrocities, but the majority of the clergy in nationalist areas revelled in their new-found power and the increased size of their congregations. Anyone who did not attend Mass faithfully was likely to be suspected of 'red' tendencies. Entrepreneurs made a great money selling religious symbols.... It was reminiscent of the way the Inquisition's persecutions of Jews and Moors helped make pork such an important part of the Spanish diet.

== Notes ==
Catholic Church titles
Preceded by Pedro Segura y Sáenz	Archbishop of Toledo; 12 April 1933 – 22 August 1940	Succeeded by Enrique Pla y Deniel
