= Spiritualities =

Clerical income deriving from tithes or other religious sources

Spiritualities is a term, often used in the Middle Ages, that refers to the income sources of a diocese or other ecclesiastical establishment that came from tithes. It also referred to income that came from other religious sources, such as offerings from church services or ecclesiastical fines.

Under canon law, spiritualities were only allowed to the clergy.

In the 19th century, the spiritualities (or spirituals) were revenues connected with the spiritual duties and the cure of souls, and they consisted almost entirely of tithes, glebe lands, and houses.

== See also ==
- Benefice
- Precarium
- Temporalities
