= Enrique Pla y Deniel =

Spanish cardinal

His Eminence Enrique Pla y Deniel
- Cardinal, Archbishop of Toledo
- See: Toledo
- Installed: 3 October 1941 – 5 July 1968
- Predecessor: Isidro Goma y Tomas
- Successor: Vicente Enrique y Tarancón
- Other post: Previously Bishop of Salamanca

Orders
- Ordination: 25 July 1900 by Bishop José Morgades y Gili
- Consecration: 8 June 1919 by Archbishop Francesco Ragonesi
- Created cardinal: 18 February 1946 by Pope Pius XII

Personal details
- Born: 19 December 1876 Barcelona, Spain
- Died: 5 July 1968 (aged 91) Toledo, Spain
- Motto: Fiat voluntas tua
- Coat of arms

Styles of Enrique Pla y Deniel
- Reference style: His Eminence
- Spoken style: Your Eminence
- Informal style: Cardinal
- See: Toledo

Enrique Pla y Deniel (19 December 1876 – 5 July 1968) was a Spanish cardinal of the Roman Catholic Church. He came from a wealthy Barcelona family and trained at the local seminary and the Gregorian University in Rome before an early career in journalism and seminary teaching. He took possession of the Salamancan see in 1935. "His seven years in Salamanca, from where he played a crucial role in the construction of General Franco's crusade, were rewarded with elevation to the primatial see of Toledo". He served as Archbishop of Toledo from 1941 until his death, and he was elevated to the cardinalate in 1946 by Pope Pius XII.

== Biography ==
Enrique Pla y Deniel was born in Barcelona, and studied at the seminary there before attending the Pontifical Gregorian University and the Angelicum in Rome. Ordained to the priesthood on 25 July 1900, he completed his studies in 1903 and then did pastoral work in Barcelona, where he also served as a seminary professor, director of several newspapers, and cathedral canon.

On 4 December 1918 Deniel was appointed Bishop of Ávila by Pope Benedict XV. He received his episcopal consecration on 8 June 1919 from Archbishop Francesco Ragonesi, with Bishops Enrique Reig y Casanova and Francisco Mas y Oliver serving as co-consecrators. Deniel was later translated to Bishop of Salamanca on 28 January 1935.

On 30 September 1936 Plá issued his famous pastoral letter "The Two Cities", and made his adherence to the insurgents' cause perfectly plain when he vacated the episcopal palace on 6 October in favour of Francisco Franco. His letter was the first lengthy episcopal consideration of the claim to be waging a just war. In it he reiterated St. Augustine's distinction between the terrestrial city, where selfishness prevails, and the celestial city, where love of God replaces all sense of self, and he depicted Spain divided into just such cities; "communism and anarchism are the very ideology leading to the disdain, the hatred for God Our lord; and against them heroism and martyrdom have flourished." The construction of the "earthly city of those without God" had been met by a "heavenly city of God's children". Plá concluded that Thomas Aquinas' conditions for a just war had been met. A rising against the loyalists had been justified. Although, in the eyes of the world, the conflict might have the external appearance of a civil war, in reality it was a crusade. The rebellion had been to re-establish civil order. The Church had to speak out in favour of order, hierarchical government, Christian civilization, religion, fatherland and family. On the same day that Plá y Deniel issued his most famous pastoral letter, General Francisco Franco was proclaimed head of state. The bishop immediately sent a telegram of congratulation anticipating the "glorious resurrection of Christian Spain".

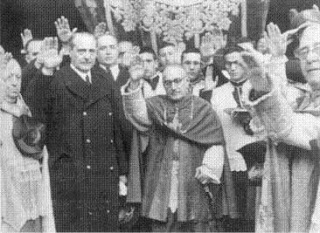
Archbishop Pla y Deniel, accompanied by Francoist Minister of Justice Esteban Bilbao, doing the Fascist salute on his solemn entrance into Toledo Cathedral, 26 March 1942.

Pope Pius XII named Deniel Archbishop of Toledo, and thus primate of the Church in Spain, on 3 October 1941. He was created cardinal-priest of San Pietro in Montorio by Pope Pius in the consistory of 18 February 1946. As a politician, he had been designated to the Cortes as Franco's personal appointee in 1943, and remained in office until 1 May 1946.

Deniel was one of the cardinal-electors who participated in the 1958 papal conclave, which selected Pope John XXIII. From 1962 to 1965, he attended the Second Vatican Council, and sat on its board of presidency.

The Spanish cardinal was considered conservative in his views. Although he was a supporter of General Franco (particularly during the Spanish Civil War), Deniel refused to dismiss a prominent priest from his post as editor of a Catholic Action newspaper after the latter attacked Spain's press censorship; he did, however, privately suspend the priest. Deniel voted in another conclave, that of 1963, which resulted in the election of Pope Paul VI.

Deniel died in Toledo, at age 91. He is buried in the Cathedral of Toledo.

== Trivia ==
- He presided over the marriage of Franco's daughter María.
- Pope Paul VI visited the ill cardinal on the day after his election to the papacy.

Catholic Church titles
Preceded by Joaquín Beltrán y Asensio	Bishop of Ávila; 1918–1935	Succeeded by Santos Moro Briz
Preceded by Francisco Frutos Valiente	Bishop of Salamanca; 1935–1941	Succeeded by Francisco Barbado y Viejo, OP
Preceded by Isidro Goma y Tomas	Archbishop of Toledo; 1941–1968	Succeeded by Vicente Enrique y Tarancón
