= Gonzalo de Beteta =

Spanish diplomat, knight of the Order of Santiago, royal counsellor and mayor

Gonzalo de Beteta (died 27 March 1484) was a Spanish diplomat, knight of the Order of Santiago, royal counsellor, 'maestresala' to Ferdinand II of Aragon and Isabella of Castille, warden of Soria Castle and mayor of Úbeda. He is recorded on diplomatic missions from 1480 onwards and headed what is considered unified Spain's first permanent embassy to the Papal States.
