= Irene Montero =

Spanish politician

Irene Montero MEP
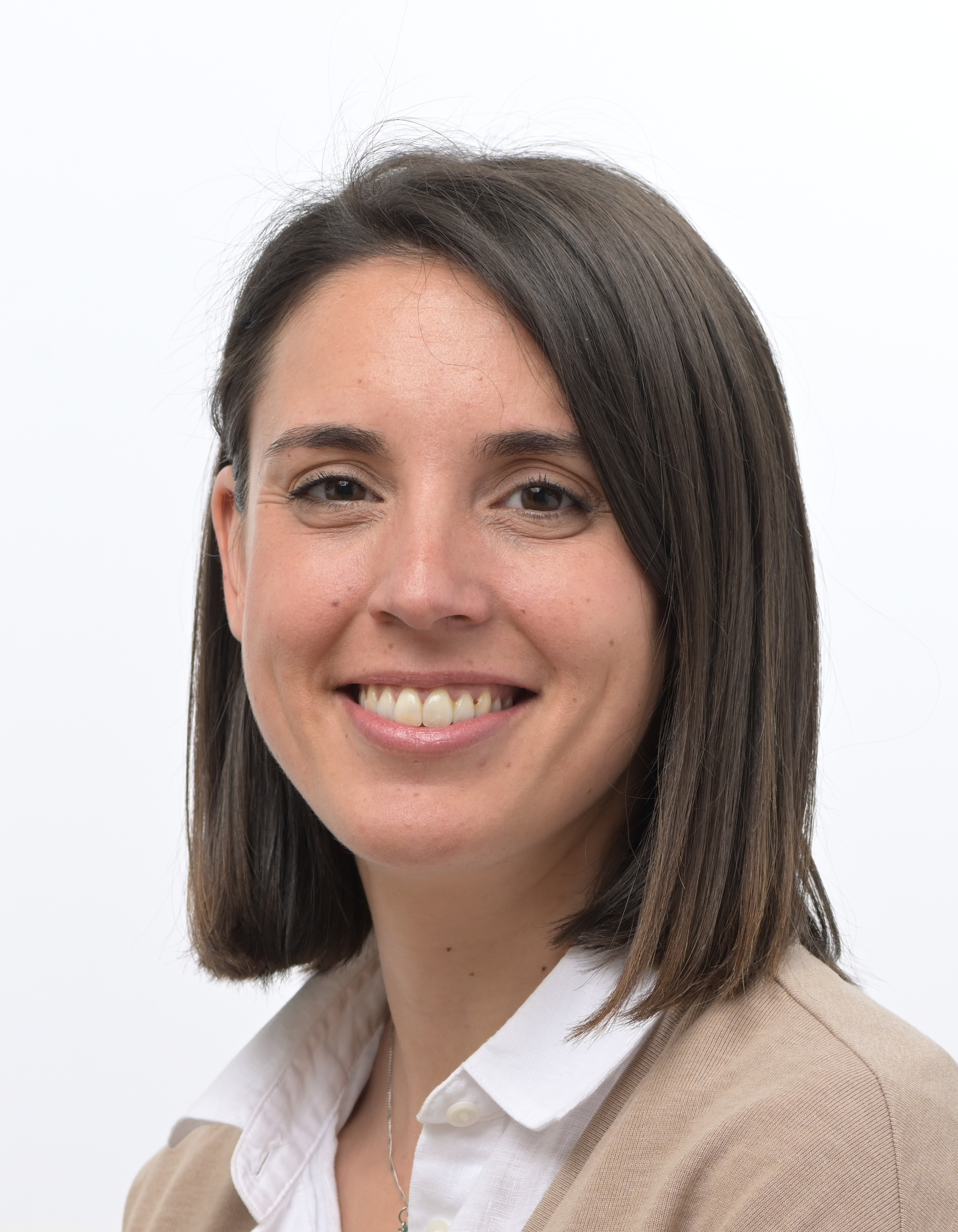

Member of the European Parliament for Spain
- Incumbent
- Assumed office 16 July 2024

Minister of Equality
- In office 13 January 2020 – 21 November 2023
- Prime Minister: Pedro Sánchez
- Preceded by: Carmen Calvo (Presidency, Relations with the Cortes and Equality)
- Succeeded by: Ana Redondo García

Member of the Congress of Deputies
- In office 13 January 2016 – 17 August 2023
- Constituency: Madrid

Personal details
- Born: Irene María Montero Gil; 13 February 1988 (age 38) Madrid, Spain
- Party: Podemos (2014–present)
- Other political affiliations: Communist Youth Union of Spain (2004–2011)
- Domestic partner: Pablo Iglesias Turrión (2016–present)
- Children: 3
- Education: Autonomous University of Madrid

Irene María Montero Gil (Spanish pronunciation: [iˈɾene monˈteɾo]; born 13 February 1988) is a Spanish politician, member of the Podemos party. She most recently served as the Minister of Equality of Spain from 13 January 2020 to 20 November 2023.

From January 2016 to August 2023, Montero was an MP for Madrid in the Congress of Deputies, and from February 2017 to January 2020 she was the Spokesperson for the Parliamentary Group Unidos Podemos-En Comú Podem-Galicia en Común in Congress. In 2024, Montero was elected as member of the European Parliament.

== Early life and education ==
Irene María Montero Gil was born in the Moratalaz neighborhood of Madrid. She joined the Communist Youth Union of Spain (UJCE) in 2004. She has a bachelor's degree in psychology from the Autonomous University of Madrid (UAM), and a master's degree in educational psychology.

She claimed to have received a scholarship for Harvard University, but chose to commit herself to politics instead of moving to the United States. In 2022 the Congress of Deputies requested to be provided a document showing evidence of her Harvard scholarship. It was later reported that due to her high grades, she received a grant to continue her studies at UAM, which came with an opportunity to also experience a training period at Harvard.

== Political career ==
=== Early beginnings ===
Montero joined Podemos after the elections to the European Parliament in 2014 together with Rafa Mayoral from the Platform of People Affected by Mortgages (PAH).

In November 2014, after being a candidate for the Citizen Council of Podemos, Montero was appointed head of Social Movements and began to lead the cabinet of the leader of Podemos, Pablo Iglesias, at which time she postponed her doctoral thesis project on new methods of educational inclusion to dedicate herself entirely to Podemos.

=== Member of Parliament (2016–2023) ===
Montero was a candidate for Madrid to the Congress of Deputies for Podemos in the elections of 20 December 2015, being elected deputy of the XI and the XII Legislature. Since 18 February 2017 she has held the position of Spokesperson of the United Confederal Group We Can-In Comú Podem-En Marea, being the youngest speaker of democracy.

During the election campaign of 20 December 2015 Iglesias announced that Montero would be the vice president and minister of the Presidency of a hypothetical government of Podemos.

In the elections of the Congress of Vistalegre II to the direction of Podemos was elected as a member of the State Citizen Council. She was the most voted woman, placing herself in fourth place, behind Pablo Iglesias, Pablo Echenique and Íñigo Errejón. She is currently a member of the Coordination Board of Podemos, secretary of Action in Congress.

As a deputy, in June 2017, Montero became the first woman in the history of Spain to intervene in parliament on a motion of no confidence.

In May 2018, Iglesias and Montero put their positions in Podemos up for a vote of no confidence, following backlash for purchasing a €615,000 country house in Galapagar. A total of 68.42% of party members voted to keep them in their roles.

=== Minister of Equality (2020–2023) ===
In January 2020, Prime Minister Pedro Sánchez appointed Montero as Minister of Equality. During her time in office, she oversaw the government's efforts on a bill to allow anyone over the age of 14 to change gender legally without a medical diagnosis or hormone therapy. She debated the ramifications of the bill with Deputy Prime Minister Carmen Calvo, who opposed it.

In May 2022, Montero announced the implementation of the 028 Rainbow Service, an emergency service for victims of queerphobic hate crimes or discrimination.

In August 2022, Spain passed legislation proposed by Montero since the La Manada rape case, in which consent for sexual intercourse had to be proven by affirmation. The change in the law allowed for convicted sex offenders to have their sentences reduced on appeal by the retroactivity of the law. Montero declared that the right-wing opposition used the retroactivity as a loophole to attack her, and she blamed the reductions on "machismo" of judges; in response to this, she was dubbed a "liberator of rapists" by Vox congress member Carla Toscano, who criticised the minister's portrayal of judges.

By 1 December, 43 convicted sex offenders had their sentences reduced by up to seven years as a result of the new law. On 14 December, the Supreme Court of Spain upheld the reductions, as accused in Spain who are not at the end of the appeals process have the right to be re-sentenced under a later, more beneficial law. The law was amended in April 2023 by the PSOE and opposition PP, which Montero considered "a sad day" and the most difficult of her tenure as a minister. In September 2023, the court of Navarra reduced the sentence of one of the members of "la Manada" from 15 years to 14 years by applying the "solo sí es sí" law.

In October 2023, during the Gaza war, Montero said that Israel's alleged violation of international criminal law and war crimes must face consequences. In May 2024, she accused the European Union of "complicity" in the Gaza genocide.

=== Member of the European Parliament (2024–present) ===
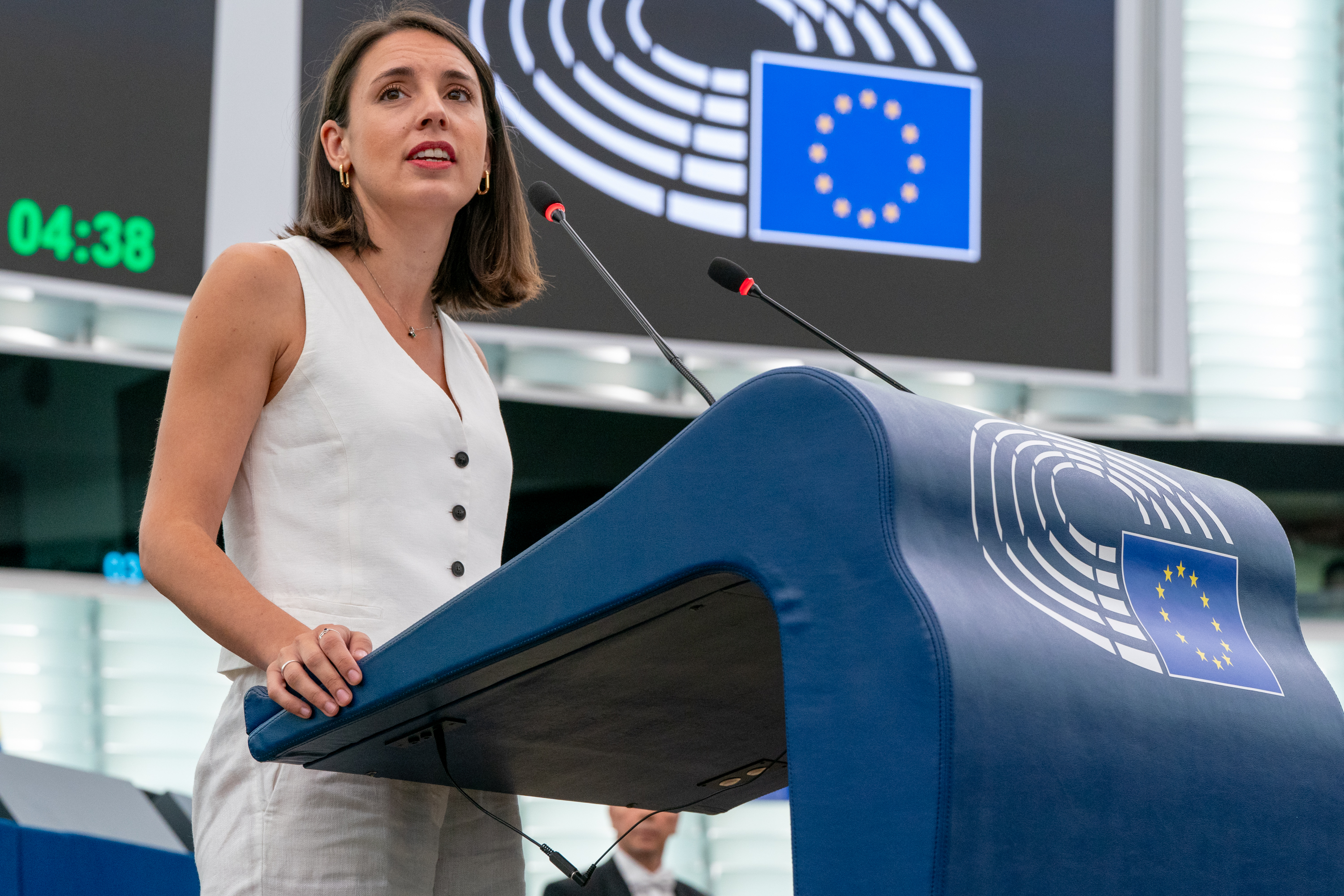
Irene Montero in July 2024

Montero ran for Member of the European Parliament in the European elections held in June 2024, as head of list for Podemos. Following her election she was appointed Vice-president of The Left in the European Parliament. In July 2024 the Left group presented her as a candidate for the Presidency of the European Parliament.

== Political positions ==
=== European Parliament protest against Donald Trump (June 2026) ===
On 16 June 2026, during a European Parliament debate on the role of the EU in the Middle East following the announced agreement between the United States and Iran, Montero criticised the EU's response and addressed the High Representative for Foreign Affairs, Kaja Kallas. Questioning what Europe had to celebrate, and referring to U.S. President Donald Trump's 80th birthday on 14 June, she sang a modified version of "Happy Birthday" that ended with the line "Happy birthday, Mr Genocide". In her remarks she asked whether Europe could celebrate having prevented a genocide or having stopped what she described as an "illegal aggression" by the United States and Israel against Iran, and whether it had broken relations with Israel or stopped the occupation of Lebanon. She later shared a video of the moment on X.

=== 2026 migration comments ===
In early 2026, Montero used language in a speech on migration at a campaign event in Zaragoza that radio presenter Carlos Herrera said echoed a "great replacement" conspiracy theory. She rejected this interpretation, stating that her comments were actually meant to denounce racism, but had been misrepresented. Following an accusation by Elon Musk that she was "advocating genocide", Montero responded on X that "decent people, must replace you, so that you stop raping, bombing, kidnapping children, and killing".

=== Foreign policy ===
In an April 2026 interview on RTVE, Montero characterised the United States and Israel as the two greatest threats to humanity, and advocated that Spain leave NATO and break diplomatic relations with Israel. In June 2025, amid debate over increased military spending, she accused Prime Minister Pedro Sánchez of dishonesty, saying he was staging "his own Azores photo".

In May 2025 she referred on X to Israel as 'a terrorist state ruled by the Hitler of our century, doing to the Palestinians the same things that the Nazis did to the Jews'.

== Personal life ==
Brought up by a practising Catholic family, Montero self-identifies as atheist. She and Pablo Iglesias have three children: twins Leo and Manuel (born 3 July 2018) and Aitana (born 4 August 2019). The twins were born premature and kept in intensive care at a public hospital in Madrid.

== Legal history ==
On June 6, 2023, in a civil case, the Supreme Court ruled that Montero had falsely accused a man of abuse without evidence. The court ordered Montero to pay €18,000 in compensation to the plaintiff, delete a tweet in which she shared a video of the opening ceremony of the Women's Institute where she made the statements for which she was convicted, and post the judgment on X. She was given 3 months to fulfil the judgment. The court imposed her an additional €5,400 fine since Montero had not complied with the order within the 3 months. In September, Montero appealed to a higher court because the judgment would erode her credibility and violate her free speech. The Constitutional Court of Spain rejected her appeal, ruling that her free speech did not protect her and that the appeal was out of time. In November 2023, Montero complied with the ruling.

Political offices
| Preceded by Carmen Calvo | Minister of Equality; 2020–2023 | Succeeded by Ana Redondo García |
