= 028 =

Emergency telephone and messaging service

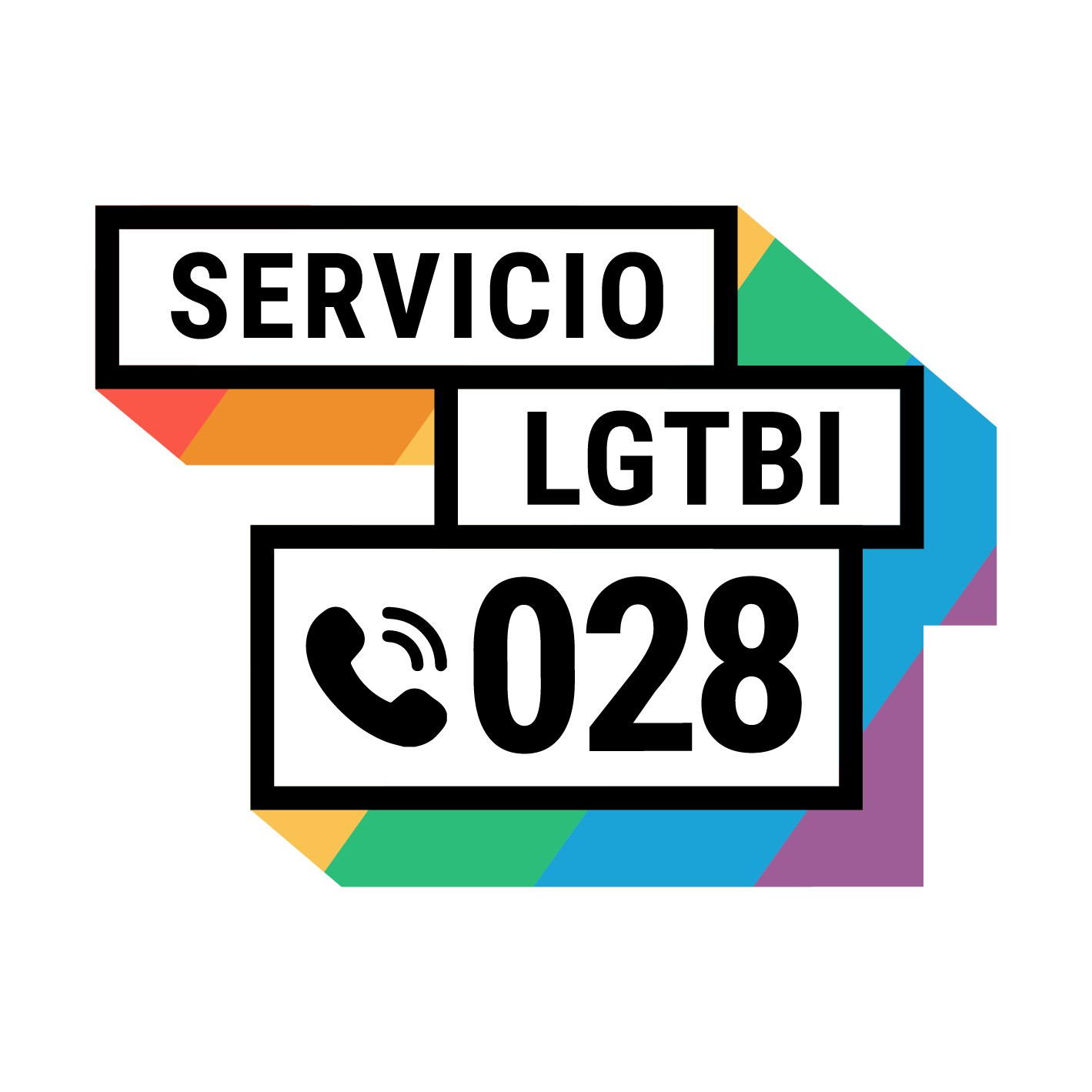
028 rainbow service.

028 rainbow service is an emergency telephone, email and instant messaging service in Spain for victims of hate crimes or discrimination based on queerphobia. Its implementation was announced for the summer of 2022 by Equality Minister Irene Montero in a press conference held on May 17, coinciding with the International Day Against Homophobia, Biphobia and Transphobia. It started operations on July 4, 2023. The number was selected as a reference to June 28, International LGBT Pride Day.

== History ==
In November 2022, the service went out to public bidding under the tentative name of 028 rainbow. Some features of the service were announced, such as it being free of charge to use, its year-round 24/7 availability, and being complemented by an email address and instant messaging service. It was announced that the phone line would serve victims of hate crimes based on sexual orientation or gender identity, as well as victims of domestic violence in same-sex relationships or minors at risk of being rejected due to their sexual orientation. The announcement also indicated that it would include emotional and psychological counseling services, and support and information on sexual and reproductive health. Likewise, it was emphasized that it would be available in different languages and with accessibility features for people with disabilities. The collected data was to be sent to the Dirección General de Diversidad Sexual y Derechos LGTBI to prepare reports on the situation of LGBTIQ+ users.

In April 2023, the government awarded the contract to manage the 028 telephone service to Servicios de Teleasistencia S.A. for 2.6 million euros. In May, the government announced that the service would be enabled and operational in the coming months. The following month, in June, the Ministry of Equality launched the "Spain is Proudly Different" campaign for International Pride Day in which it also presented the 028 service, which got the official name of the "Rainbow Line for information and comprehensive care against queerphobia".

On July 5, 2023, a few days after the second anniversary of the Killing of Samuel Luiz, the service began operations throughout the Spanish territory, with access to people with hearing and speech disabilities, and offering its services in Spanish, Catalan, Galician, Basque, English and French.
