= La Manada rape case =

Gang rape case in Spain, 2016

The La Manada rape case, also known as the wolf pack case, began with the gang rape of an 18-year-old woman on 7 July 2016 during the San Fermín celebrations in Pamplona, Navarre, Spain. The case drew intense public scrutiny as it called into question the definition of rape under Spanish law. Five men, including a member of the Civil Guard and another of the Spanish Army from Seville, filmed themselves repeatedly attacking the girl in the vestibule of an apartment building. La Manada means "the pack" in Spanish.

After their arrest and trial, the men were cleared of sexual aggression charges and instead found guilty of sexual abuse because the prosecution could not prove they employed violence to subjugate the victim. Thousands took to the streets in Pamplona and across Spain to manifest their disapproval of the verdict. The inquiry of the aggression uncovered footage shared on social media recorded by the perpetrators in Pozoblanco, Andalusia, showing an unresponsive girl lying on their van subject to groping and derision, which gave rise to another lawsuit.

In a sentence handed down on 21 June 2019, the Spanish Supreme Court reversed the lower court and affirmed that the men were guilty of rape, remanding José Ángel Prenda, Jesús Escudero, Alfonso Jesús Cabezuelo, Antonio Manuel Guerrero and Ángel Boza to 15 years in prison; Guerrero was given an additional two years for stealing the victim's mobile phone. Boza would later have his prison sentence shortened to 14 years.

== Background ==
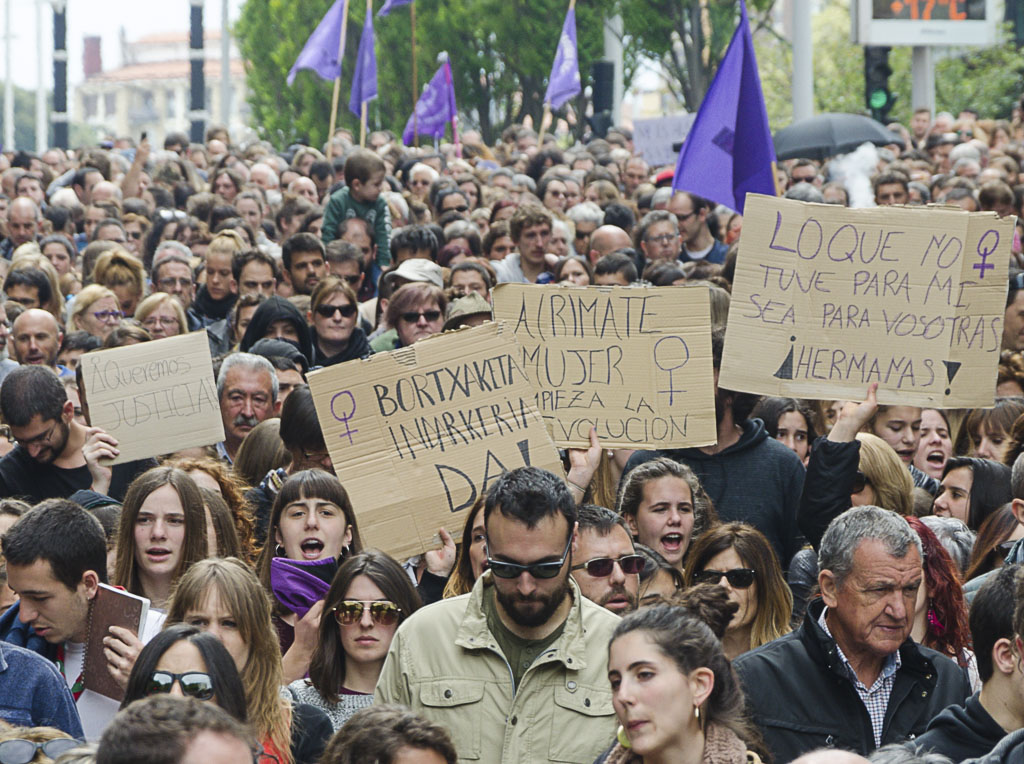
Demonstration against the sentence in Pamplona

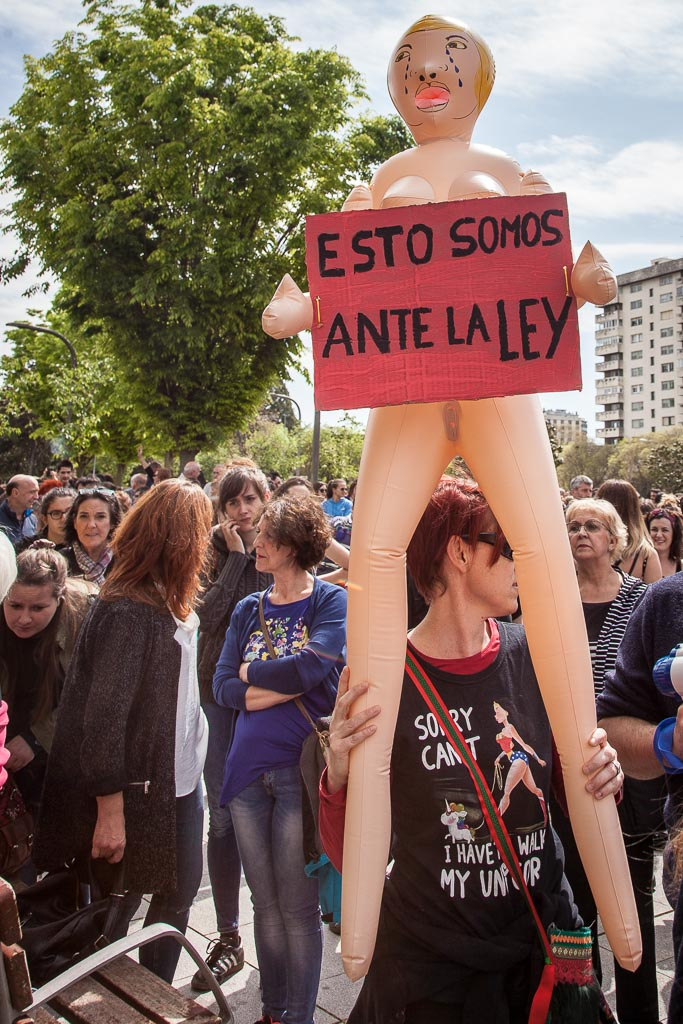
Protesters in Pamplona

In the early hours of 7 July, an 18-year-old girl reported a rape to the Police of Pamplona, perpetrated by five young men. The girl, who was going to her car to sleep, was accompanied during a part of the journey by the group of men she had just met. She alleged that they pushed her into a doorway of a building. While some committed the crime, others recorded it on their mobile phones. She was later abandoned in the doorway and her mobile phone was stolen.

The perpetrators shared the video of the attack in a WhatsApp group called "La Manada" ("the wolfpack"). Seven clips of this video were studied by the police in a 200-page report in which it is reported that the girl maintained a "passive and neutral" attitude, that her attitude was not "participatory" and that there was "humiliation and vexation" toward her.

After the offence, a couple in the street approached the victim and called the local Pamplona police. Following an interview with the victim, at least three police officers started a search for the perpetrators at 3.30 am. They followed the description provided and surveyed CCTV in the streets of central Pamplona. After tracking down the men of La Manada in the traditional bull running, the local and Navarrese police arrested them on the same day around noon in the city district of San Jorge.

== Trial ==
=== Charges filed ===
The prosecution was represented by the public prosecutor, the victim, the City of Pamplona, and the Government of Navarre. The tribunal considered in the sentence that the victim's testimony was objectively credible, was consistent throughout the investigation, did not introduce "improbable elements" and did not have "spurious motives" to make the accusation. It considered that there was "minimal violence" and "very serious intimidation that prevented the defense of the victim" surrounded by the five men, and that they left her helpless after the event because they took her mobile phone. The defendants argued that it was group consensual sex and she had made the accusation for fear that the video could be seen by other people.

=== Development ===
18 months after the attack, on 15 November 2017, the Court of Navarre took two diverging paths concerning evidence during the inquest; it unanimously accepted as evidence a report by a private detective commissioned by the defence to track the victim's whereabouts and behaviour following her assault, ultimately aimed at showing that the victim "held normal interactions" in social networks, and undermine her case. By contrast, the tribunal rejected as evidence relevant to the lawsuit footage from 1 May 2016 in Pozoblanco, Andalusia, showing the La Manada men sitting in their van next to an unconscious 21-year-old girl, and speaking of "fucking the Sleeping Beauty", "the new Marta del Castillo", wondering whether she was dead, as well as citing burundanga, and chloroform.

On Thursday, 26 April 2018, five months after the trial, the Provincial Court of Navarre published its judgment. The court sentenced the five accused to nine years in prison for continued sexual abuse, although they did not find them guilty of sexual aggression (which would have meant 12 to 15 years of prison). As a result, the convicts were released on a 6,000 euro bail, until a final court decision. Amidst uproar raised by the judicial decision, opposition forces bitterly criticised the Spanish government for not incorporating into the Spanish Civil Code the Istanbul Convention signed four years earlier, and for not enforcing the State Agreement against Gender Violence. On 5 December 2018, the Provincial Court of Navarre confirmed the initial sentence, with two dissenting judges who still considered that the victim was subject to aggression.

On 4 January 2019, the Provincial Court of Navarre dismissed the intent pursued by the popular accusation, i.e. the City of Pamplona and Government of Navarre, to imprison the convicts, confirming their freedom. Despite being considered a serious offence, the Court of Navarre opted to leave the convicts free on parole until the sentence is final, arguing "inexistence of flight risk". Ahead of the Supreme Court's final decision on the case, the Data Protection Agency imposed on one of the assailants a €150,000 fine for distributing the footage of the victim during the assault.

=== Final sentence ===
On 21 June 2019, the Supreme Court of Spain upgraded the five men's previous convictions for sexual abuse to that of continuous sexual assault, and handed down 15-year prison terms. The sentence states that the victim was "intimidated", she was "overcome by fear", and "could offer no resistance", concluding that the crime was a rape. Antonio Manuel Guerrero received two additional years for stealing the victim's mobile phone. The sentence also banned them from coming within 500 metres of the victim for a period of 20 years and ordered compensation totalling €100,000.

The Court of Navarre ordered the immediate detention of the five convicts for risk of flight, just as two of them were about to leave Seville. On transfer to prison after arrest, El Prenda, one of the perpetrators, was filmed showing a smirk at the cameras. After notification of the final sentence, the Chief Bureau of the Civil Guard announced that it would initiate the procedure to remove Guerrero from the Spanish police force "as soon as possible".

On 5 July 2019, the Supreme Court issued the whole sentence, elaborating on different points that had raised controversy and the definition of sexual assault (aggression). The sentence states that "consensual sex is only made clear by explicit consent or clearly inferred from the circumstances" according to the Istanbul Convention, considers the first sentence by the Court of Navarre an 'error', and asserts that "the victim needs to show no heroic opposition, which may lead to further harm to her".

Video of demonstrations on 26 April 2018, in Madrid streets.

=== Spanish legal details ===
In Spain, the crime of sex without consent had 2 legal categories during the period, sexual aggression or sexual abuse. Sexual aggression was defined as necessitating violence (violencia) or intimidation (intimidación), sexual abuse is without violence, however there were controversies regarding the interpretation of these legal terms by the public; "intimidation" was narrower than abusing superiority or influence over the victim. The legal status quo remained in place until the Law for the Guarantee of Sexual Freedom in 2022.

== Reactions ==
After the first convictions, there were demonstrations in Spanish cities against the leniency of the sentence, and political and social figures voiced their disagreement. Feminist associations, such as the 7N platform, denounced the first sentence as "very bad precedent". They pointed out that once again women are held responsible for the assaults they suffer. On 22 June 2018 the five culprits were released on bail of 6,000 euros. Joseba Asiron (EH Bildu), mayor of Pamplona at the time of the assault, criticised the sentence and considered the decision to release the convicts "highly distressing". American actresses Jessica Chastain and Rose McGowan expressed condemnation of the sentence.

Following the April 2018 conviction, the Civil Guard officer Antonio Manuel Guerrero and the army soldier Alfonso Jesús Cabezuelo were suspended from duty but continued to be paid 75% of their wage until all appeals had been heard. Cabezuelo was expelled from the army in October 2018. Guerrero held his position in the paramilitary police body until notification of the final sentence.

In response to the final sentence, feminist associations, Manuela Carmena, Pedro Sanchez, Irene Montero, Pablo Iglesias, Joseba Asiron, and Ines Arrimadas saluted the decision and the definition of the crime as rape. Juan Carlos Girauta likened the rapists to the pro-independence leaders facing trial for the 1-O 2017 Referendum, labelled 'putschists'. When the final Supreme Court decision was pronounced on 21 June 2019, 130 feminist associations demanded that this sentence set legal precedent for the future.

== Related developments ==
During the defendants' parole awaiting the outcome to their appeal, four members of the 'Manada' were subject to prosecution for another sex abuse case involving an unconscious 21-year-old woman lying unresponsive on the defendants' van in Pozoblanco, Andalusia. In late October, the convicts were declared persona non grata in Pozoblanco, Córdoba, hometown of the victim of the male group's alleged assault in 2016, now under investigation.

In late November 2018, the same panel of judges in charge of "La Manada" case convicted a man from Lodosa, Navarre, of occasional 'mistreatment' and handed down a 10-month prison term in a case in which the defendant "attempted to kill [the victim] with a knife and by strangulation while she struggled for her life, with their young children watching, before eventually giving up"; the sentence cited the man's mental state as a mitigating factor. Amnesty International has denounced the hurdles encountered by victims of gender aggression in the Spanish justice system.

In September 2023, Ángel Boza, who was one of the five so-called "Wolf Pack rapists," had his prison sentence reduced from 15 years to 14 years.

=== Expansion of legal definition of sexual assault ===
Outcry from the case also led to the passage of Spain's 2022 "only yes means yes" sexual consent law, which expanded the nation's legal definition of sexual assault to include any sexual interaction without consent and required a maximum 15-year prison sentence for violent rape.

== See also ==
- Me Too movement
- Rubiales affair
- Altsasu incident (2016)
