= Ley del solo sí es sí =

Spanish law

The ley del solo sí es sí (lit. "Only yes is yes law"), in full the Ley Orgánica 10/2022, de 6 de septiembre, de garantía integral de la libertad sexual is a Spanish law approved by the Cortes Generales on 25 August 2022. It is also known as the ley Montero for its promotion by Minister of Equality Irene Montero.

The law requires for a defendant to prove sexual consent was given, eliminated the offence of abuso sexual and merged it with agresión sexual (sexual assault), a charge that previously required proof of violence or intimidation. The minimum sentence was reduced from eight years to six, which could be applied retroactively due to Spanish law. This led to over 900 offenders having their sentence cut and over 100 being freed before the law was amended in April 2023. Pedro Sánchez, the prime minister of Spain, apologised for the loophole and called it his government's "biggest mistake". The United Nations special rapporteur on violence against women and girls stated that the negative effects of the initial legislation could have been avoided with more consultation.

Other aspects of the law include the elevation of stalking, catcalling and street harassment from misdemeanours to crimes, and increased sentences for gang rape and sexual crimes involving drugging, while classing female genital mutilation and forced marriage as crimes of gender violence. The law bans advertisements considered pornographic, including those for prostitution. The law offers financial aid and priority in social housing for victims of sexual offences earning under €14,000, and mandates sexual education in schools, certain university courses, and for sex offenders.

== Background and content ==
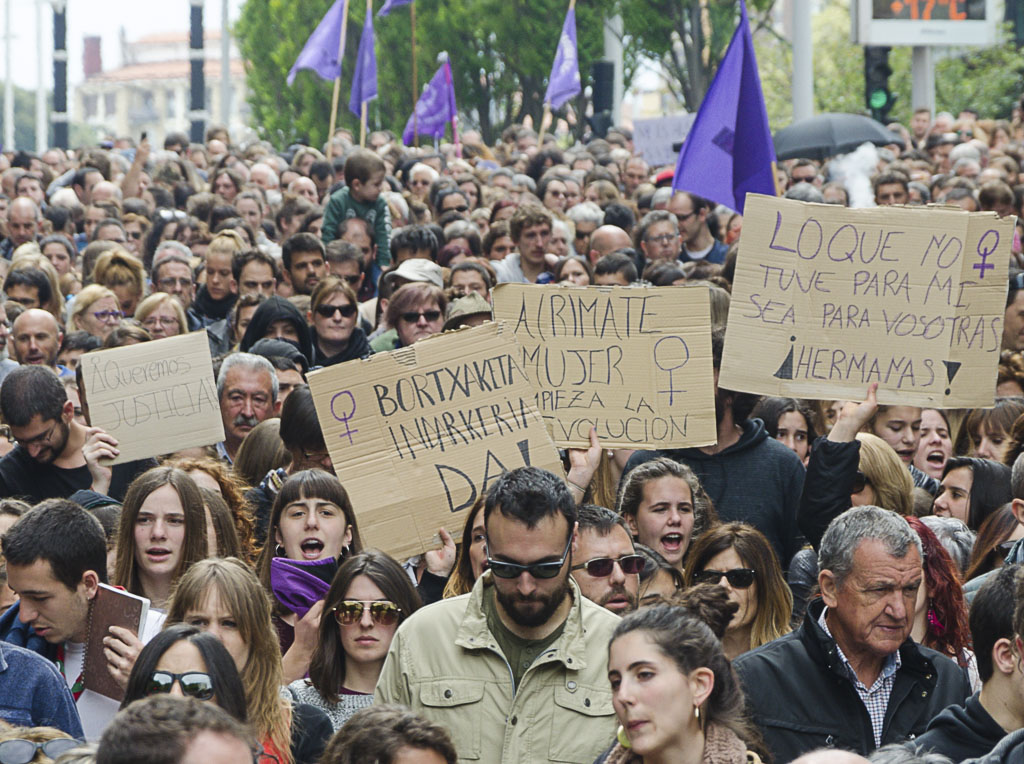
Demonstration against the sentencing for the La Manada rape case, in which five men were initially convicted of abuso sexual and not rape, because violence was not proven.

A catalyst event for the new law was the La Manada rape case in Pamplona in 2016. A group of five men raped an 18-year-old woman, and at first were only convicted of the lesser charge of sexual abuse as the judge said that there was neither violence nor intimidation. The decision was widely protested against, and the Supreme Court of Spain subsequently convicted the men of rape. The Spanish Socialist Workers' Party (PSOE)–Unidas Podemos government of Spain, self-described as feminist, began to draft the new law.

Prior to the law, Spain had two separate offences of abuso sexual and agresión sexual, the latter usually translated into English as sexual assault. The charge of agresión sexual required violence or intimidation to be proven. In cases such as the victim being intoxicated, the charge was not applied. After the 2022 law, the charge of abuso sexual was eliminated, meaning that those who would have been charged under it would be charged with agresión sexual. The common name for the law, ley del solo sí es sí, refers to changes from the previous law; defendants have to prove the sexual consent of the complainant. Sexual contact without consent is treated as agresión sexual, whether or not there was violence or intimidation.

Other aspects of the law include upgrading stalking, catcalling and street harassment from misdemeanours to crimes. Sentences are increased for gang rape and rapes involving drugging. The law also bans advertisements considered pornographic. This includes advertisements for prostitution. The PSOE sought a complete criminalisation of prostitution and pimping including cases without violence or coercion, but that was opposed by other left-wing parties who supported the individual's right to prostitution. Female genital mutilation and forced marriage are also classed as gender violence.

Additionally, the law offers economic aid to sexual offence victims earning under €14,000, as well as priority for social housing. It mandates sex education in all schools, university courses relating to teaching, healthcare and law, and to sex offenders.

The General Council of the Judiciary (CGPJ), which governs the Judiciary of Spain, criticised the law for making the accused responsible for proving consent had been given. This criticism was also voiced by the opposition People's Party, who voted against the law. Vox called the law "ideological and sectarian" and believed that false accusations would be made for financial benefit.

In February 2024, Dani Alves would receive the first high-profile trial under the law.

== Sentencing controversy ==
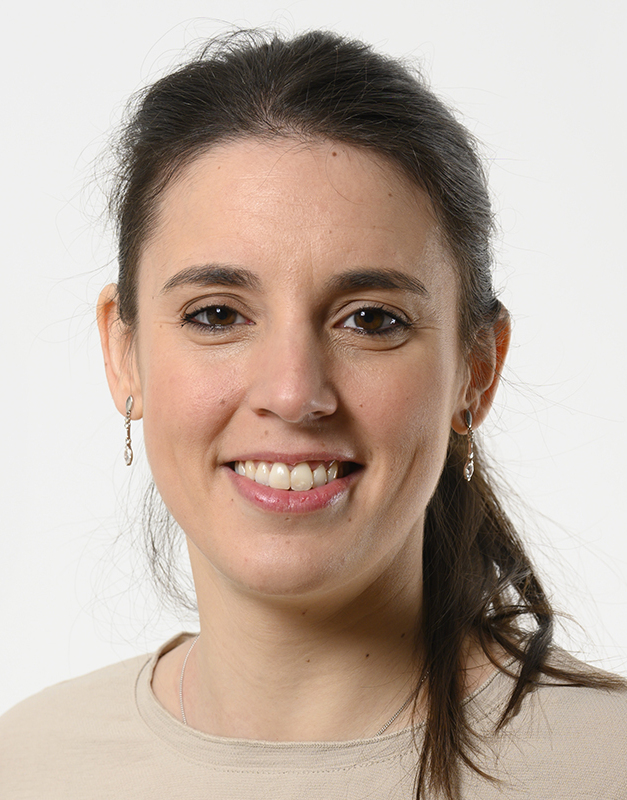
Minister of Equality Irene Montero said that the retroactively reduced sentences under the law were due to sexism by judges. The Supreme Court of Spain upheld the reduced sentences as legal.

Convicts in Spain have the right to appeal for their sentence to be reduced if the law has changed to a lower sentence since their conviction. The amalgamation of the former offence of abuso sexual into agresión sexual meant a wider range of punishments for the latter offence, depending on its gravity, but the minimum sentence was reduced from eight years to six. The CGPJ had warned of the law's effect on sentencing.

Irene Montero, Minister of Equality and a promoter of the law, said that the reduced sentences were because of sexist judges. The CGPJ rejected this statement. The Supreme Court of Spain upheld the reduced sentences as legal in December 2022, as it is "obligatory" to apply a new law retroactively if it is beneficial to the convict.

The law was amended in April 2023 by the PSOE with support from the centre-right PP, in order to remove its loopholes. Montero criticised the PSOE for relying on PP support, called the amendment a "setback" for women's rights and her "most difficult day as a minister".

In April 2023, the prime minister of Spain, Pedro Sánchez, apologised to victims of sexual crimes for the reduced sentences as a result of the law. By that point, 104 sex offenders had been released and 978 had reduced sentences due to the new law. In June, he called the previous loophole the "biggest mistake" of his government, adding that he never considered dismissing Montero over the controversy.

Reem Alsalem, the United Nations special rapporteur on violence against women and girls, stated that the law was rushed and its negative consequences could have been avoided had advice been taken from bodies such as the CGPJ. She congratulated the law for guaranteeing reparation for victims, but found that this did not happen in practice.
