= La Manada sex abuse case of Pozoblanco =

The La Manada sex abuse case of Pozoblanco is the legal process pursued against a group of men from Seville for the sex abuse of a 21-year-old girl in Pozoblanco, southern Spain, on 1 May 2016. The case received media attention due to the fact that the defendants were the same aggressors of the La Manada gang rape which took place in Pamplona, Navarre, against an 18-year-old girl from Madrid two months later in July 2016, for which they were convicted and imprisoned.

== Evidence and inception of the case ==
The case arose following the discovery of footage in a phone belonging to one of the aggressors in La Manada gang rape of Pamplona, which showed an unresponsive girl lying in a van being subjected to groping and mockery. The victim, who has little memory of the elapsed time, let a friend know that "something had happened" to her, but knew of the sex abuses she suffered only after officers from the regional police of Navarre showed her the evidence, deciding in turn to report.

She remembers getting into the van with the military officer and later waking up naked on the rear seat, with her stockings ripped apart. She remained unconscious during 45 minutes. He allegedly asked the girl to give oral sex, which she refused, for which he slapped her and hit her on the arm, let her out in the street on her own, insulting her, as she reported. The following day she took pictures of her leg with bruises on it to keep as evidence. She thinks she may have been drugged, which is consistent with comments shared by the defendants on WhatsApp, used to spike drinks.

As revealed in the mobile phone footage studied in La Manada rape case of Pamplona, a member of La Manada sitting next to an unconscious 21-year-old girl, spoke of "fucking the Sleeping Beauty", "the new Marta del Castillo", wondering whether she was dead, as well as citing burundanga, and chloroform.

== Hearings and sentences ==
The hearings commenced in November 2019. The prosecutor petitioned a three-year prison term each for sex abuse, and four years more for offence to privacy, for recording and posting the footage. Alfonso Jesús Cabezuelo, a military officer at the time of the events, was requested an additional 12 euros fine per day over two months for injuring the girl with a smack.

On 4 June 2020, the jurisdictional tribunal of Cordova found Alfonso Jesús Cabezuelo, Jesús Escudero and Antonio Manuel Guerrero guilty of sex abuse and offense against intimacy, and condemned them to prison terms of two years and ten months each. They were also imposed a fine of 3,600 euros and ban to get closer than 500 metres of the victim in four years. José Angel Prenda was also convicted of diffusing the images on WhatsApp, and punished with a prison term of four years and six months.

== Reactions ==
The group against gender violence in Cordova immediately reacted to the sentences, labelling them 'disgraceful' and calling a public meeting to show their rejection of the sentence.

== See also ==
- Murder of Marta del Castillo
