= Murder of Samuel Luiz =

2021 murder in Spain

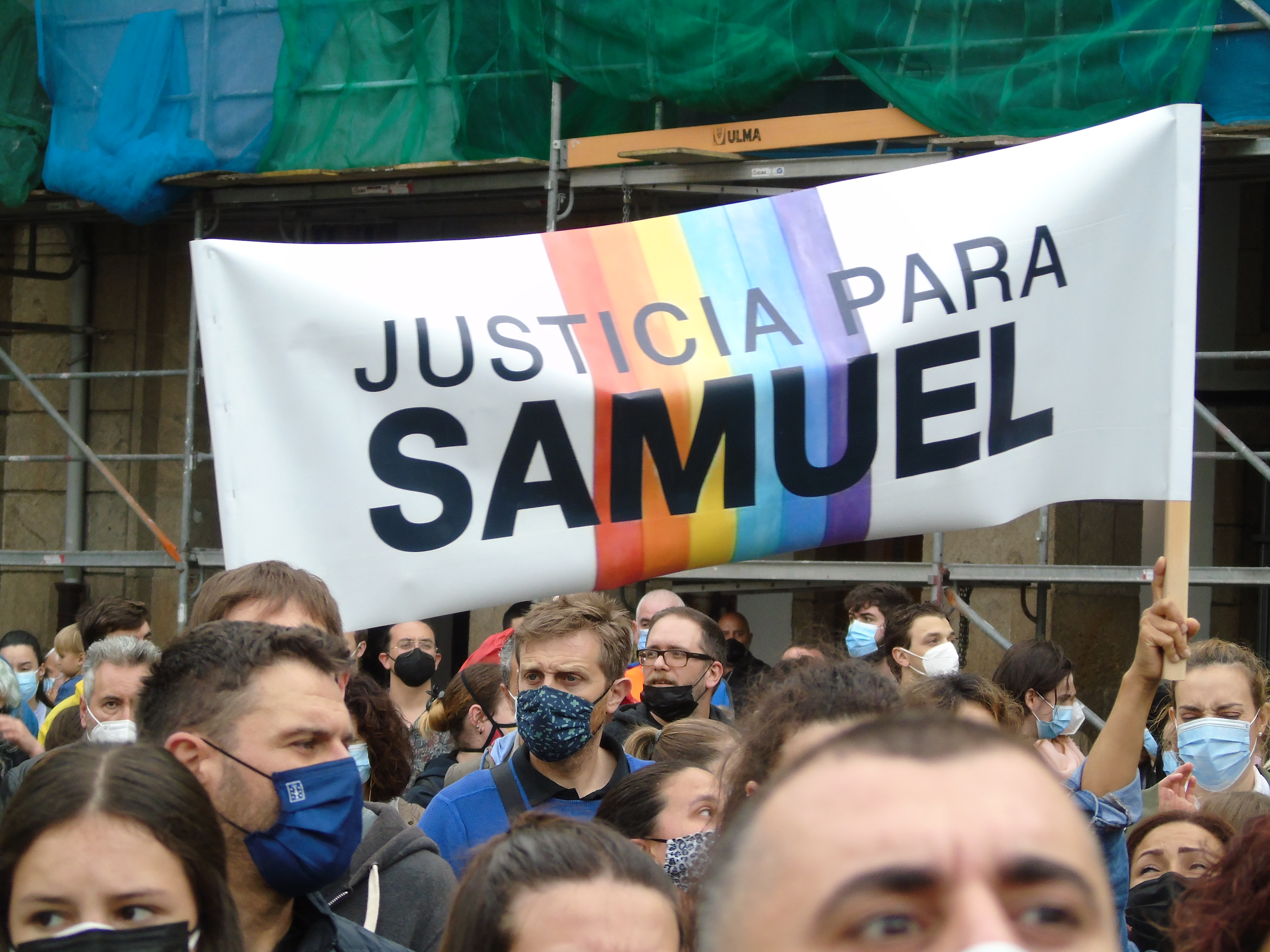
- Demonstration in memory of Samuel Luiz in A Coruña
- Date: 3 July 2021
- Location: A Coruña, Spain

Samuel Luiz Muñiz, a 24-year-old nursing assistant, was beaten to death in A Coruña, Galicia, Spain, on 3 July 2021. In November 2024, three men were found guilty of his murder, one man as an accomplice, and one woman was acquitted. It was accepted by the jury that one murderer, Diego Montaña, was motivated by homophobia. The three murderers were sentenced to over 20 years in prison each, and the accomplice to 10. The murder was followed by country-wide demonstrations in Samuel Luiz's memory, and in defence of LGBT community.

== Victim ==
Luiz was born in Brazil and moved to Spain at the age of one. His mother was Spanish, and the family lived in Culleredo and later Arteixo, both in the vicinity of A Coruña. From the ages of 18 to 20, he studied to be a nursing assistant and worked as one in a nursing home while studying a further course to be a dental prosthetist. He played the flute in an evangelical Christian congregation and did not disclose his homosexuality to his father, who was also of that faith. In a television interview, Luiz's father said that he had only spoken once to his son about the possibility that he was gay, but the young man did not want to continue the conversation.

== Crime ==
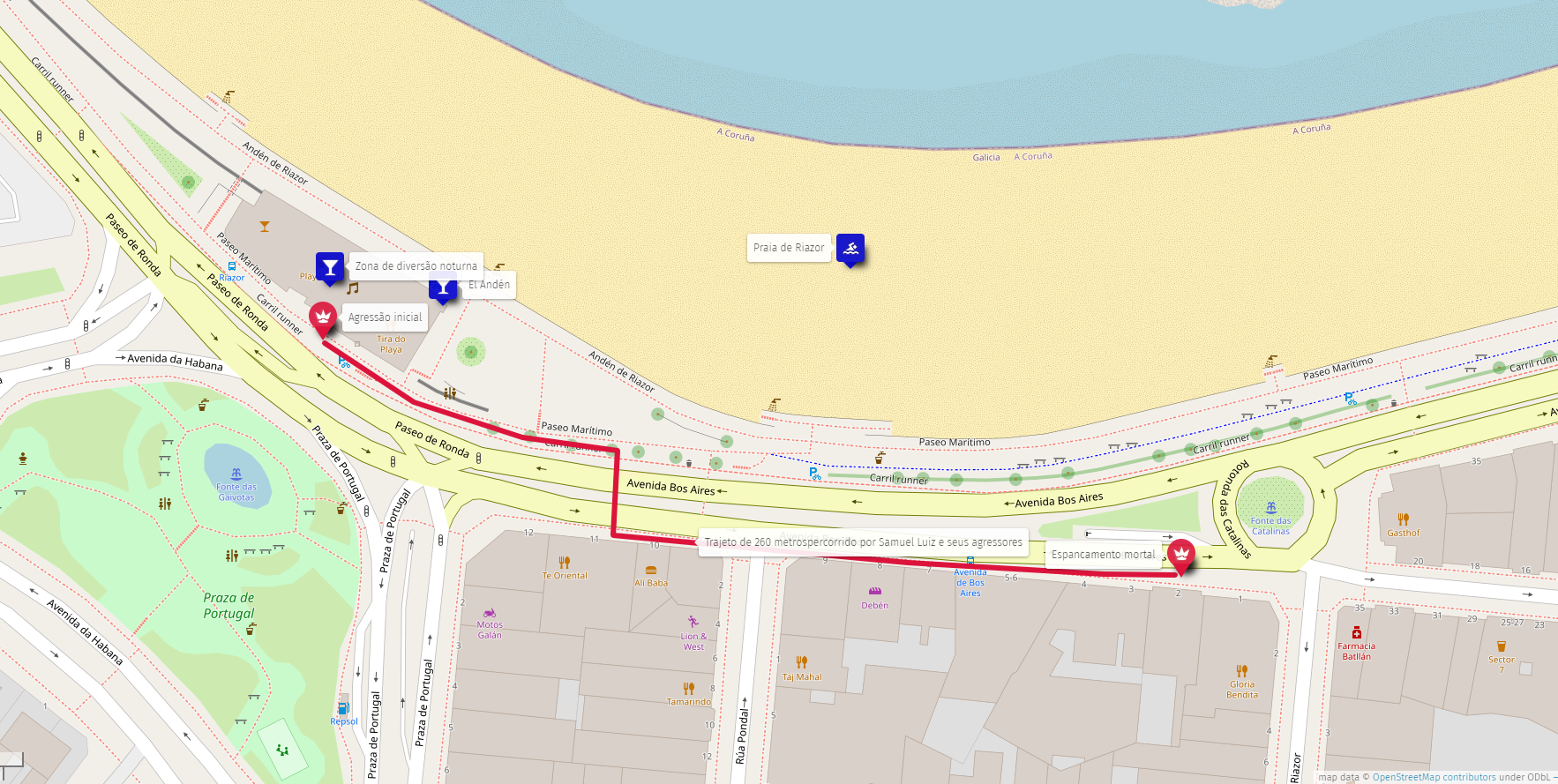
Street map of the crime scene. The red point on the left is the starting site of the crime, the red point on the right is where Luiz was killed.

According to Luiz's female friend who witnessed the crime, they were on a night out and stepped outside to smoke. Luiz was in a video call with another friend and rotated his phone to show the surroundings to the friend. A male and a female were walking by and believed they were being filmed. According to the witness, the male then walked up to Luiz and said "you will either stop filming, or I'll kill you, faggot", to which Luiz replied, "Faggot, why?", before being beaten. (Note: The word allegedly used was "maricón", commonly used as a homophobic slur.)

Luiz's friend and other men managed to break up the fight. Luiz then asked his friend to find his lost mobile phone. While she was away, the attacker returned with 12 others and beat Luiz to death. The beating took place over 15 minutes and 250 metres. According to the investigation, after the killing the suspects have re-united twice more that night to discuss the incident. Presumably, in the second re-union, after learning the victim died, they coordinated between themselves to destroy some of the evidence.

== Investigation ==
Two witnesses claimed that the group that killed Luiz was composed of men between 20 and 30 years old. Two men who helped to interrupt the initial fight were Ibrahima Diack and Magatte N'Diaye, illegal immigrants from Senegal, who work as hawkers. The government considered regularising their legal situation in Spain as a reward for their actions. According to some reports, the police also considered one of these men as a victim of the aggression as he was attacked during his intervention and thus put his own life into danger. In February 2025, the two men were given honorary citizenship of A Coruña.

Thirteen people were interviewed over the fatal beating. On 6 July, the police said that while they could not disregard any hypothetical motive, the initial evidence did not point to homophobia. According to investigators, the group of strangers would not have known that Luiz was gay. By the night of that same day, three people – two male and one female – were officially in custody. On 8 July, the police confirmed an arrest of a fourth attacker, who allegedly also stole the victim's mobile phone after the attack. None of the arrested subjects had previous criminal records.

On 9 July, two more suspects were arrested, both underage, one of them having past criminal records. Three of four suspects arrested previously were ordered to stay in prison during pre-trial, without a release on bail option, while the other one (the woman) was released for the pre-trial period. On 29 September, after about three months of investigation, a seventh suspect was arrested.

=== Trial ===
The case went to trial in November 2024. Three people were convicted of murder, one of being an accomplice, and one was acquitted. The prosecution put forward that the attackers acted in a group, which was not found to be the case by the jury. Diego Montaña was held in pre-trial detention for over three years before the trial. He was identified by witnesses and his co-accused as the leader of the attack. The jury found it proven that he had made threats related to Luiz's sexual orientation, and the prosecution requested a prison sentence of 25 years due to the aggravating factor of discrimination. His defence team wanted the charge of manslaughter and wounding, but he was convicted of pre-meditated murder.

Alejandro Freire, also known as "El Yumba", admitted in court after witnesses and images had proven it that he had strangled Luiz. His defence team attributed his violence to alcohol and cocaine use, a dysfunctional childhood, and attention deficit hyperactivity disorder, which was rejected in court. He was convicted of pre-meditated murder. Kaio Amaral's defence admitted that he had robbed Luiz of his mobile phone, but denied that he had struck Luiz at all. A controversy during the trial was whether Amaral had kicked Luiz, as the angle of video footage was inconclusive, but witness testimony resulted in a conviction of premeditated murder in addition to robbery. Unlike others, the jury decision was not unanimous. Amaral had also instructed his family to present him in a more respectable light on social media as a way to influence public opinion. His girlfriend was investigated for false testimony after the trial.

Alejandro Míguez was convicted as an accomplice to murder with seven votes of the nine-person jury. He prevented Luiz from escaping and held back interveners. Katy Silva, the girlfriend of Montaña, faced charges of premeditated murder motivated by discrimination, for which she could have faced a 25-year prison sentence. She was accused by Luiz's friend Lina of having prevented bystanders from intervening in the attack. Other witnesses said that she tried to subdue her partner physically, which was agreed on unanimously by the jury, and she was acquitted. She and her family had moved away from A Coruña due to the accusations. In January 2025, judge Elena Fernanda Pastor Novo sentenced the criminals. Montaña, Freire, and Amaral received prison sentences of 24, 20, and 20 years and six months, respectively. Mínguez received a 10-year sentence. The criminals were also made to pay €303,000 in compensation to the family of their victim.

== Reaction ==
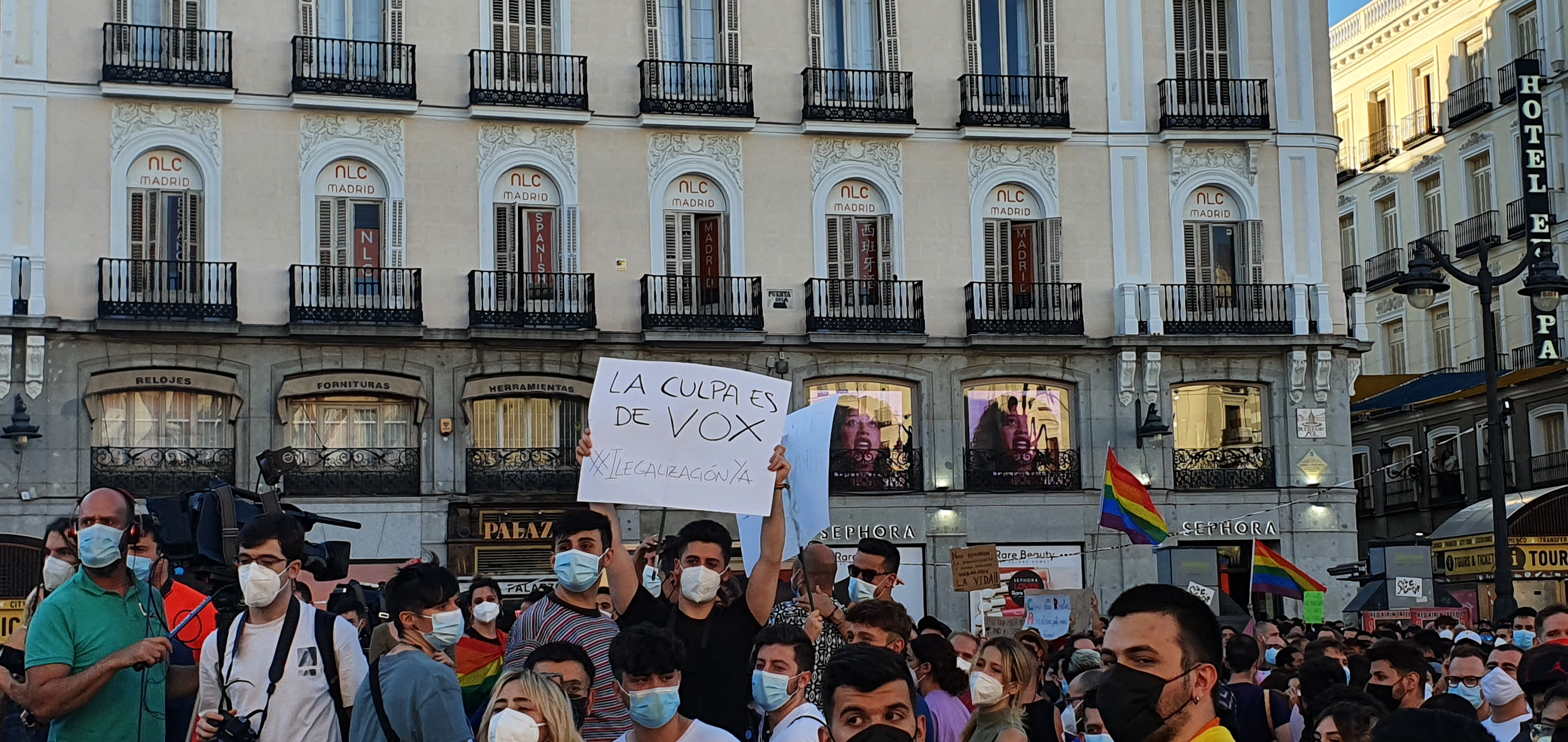
A protester in the Puerta del Sol, Madrid, blaming the crime on Vox. Vox sued public figures who linked the party to the crime.

Luiz's death was met by demonstrations in his memory in cities across Spain. In Madrid, police employed baton charges to break up demonstrations in the city centre; these actions were condemned by politicians including Mónica García and Pablo Echenique. Alberto Núñez Feijóo, the president of Galicia, condemned the crime but said that he would not link it to homophobia until that had been established. The leader of the opposition Ana Pontón criticised this declaration. Luiz's father called for people not to politicise the crime. A study revealed the high level of politicisation and polarisation in the public debate on social media about this event, including misinformation, demonstrating that even tragedies are subjected to an online pseudo-jury from an interpretative polarization scheme.

Juan Carlos Monedero, a former leading member of Podemos, wrote on Twitter, "Can anyone explain to me which God do Vox and its supporters pray to when someone is murdered because of their hatred against homosexuals. Think about it @AlmeidaPP_ (José Luis Martínez-Almeida, mayor of Madrid), if you had hung the LGBTI flag from the city hall, Samuel's murder would have been slightly more difficult." Vox announced that they would sue him for defamation, and Almeida condemned the insinuation against himself. Vox also announced plans to sue the political pundit Martu Garrote for having written "You spend all your life raising a son, ensuring his dream and, when you are happy because he is a nursing assistant, because he is a good person, because the worst has already happened, a pack of hyenas come and kill him because he doesn't live and love according to dogma. That is Vox, that is the far right."

The killing and the subsequent protests made international headlines in Europe and America, and many international artists such as Sam Smith, Beyoncé, Ricky Martin, and Lena Headey shared the news on their social media.
