= Spanish National March in Opposition to Male Violence(s) Against Women =

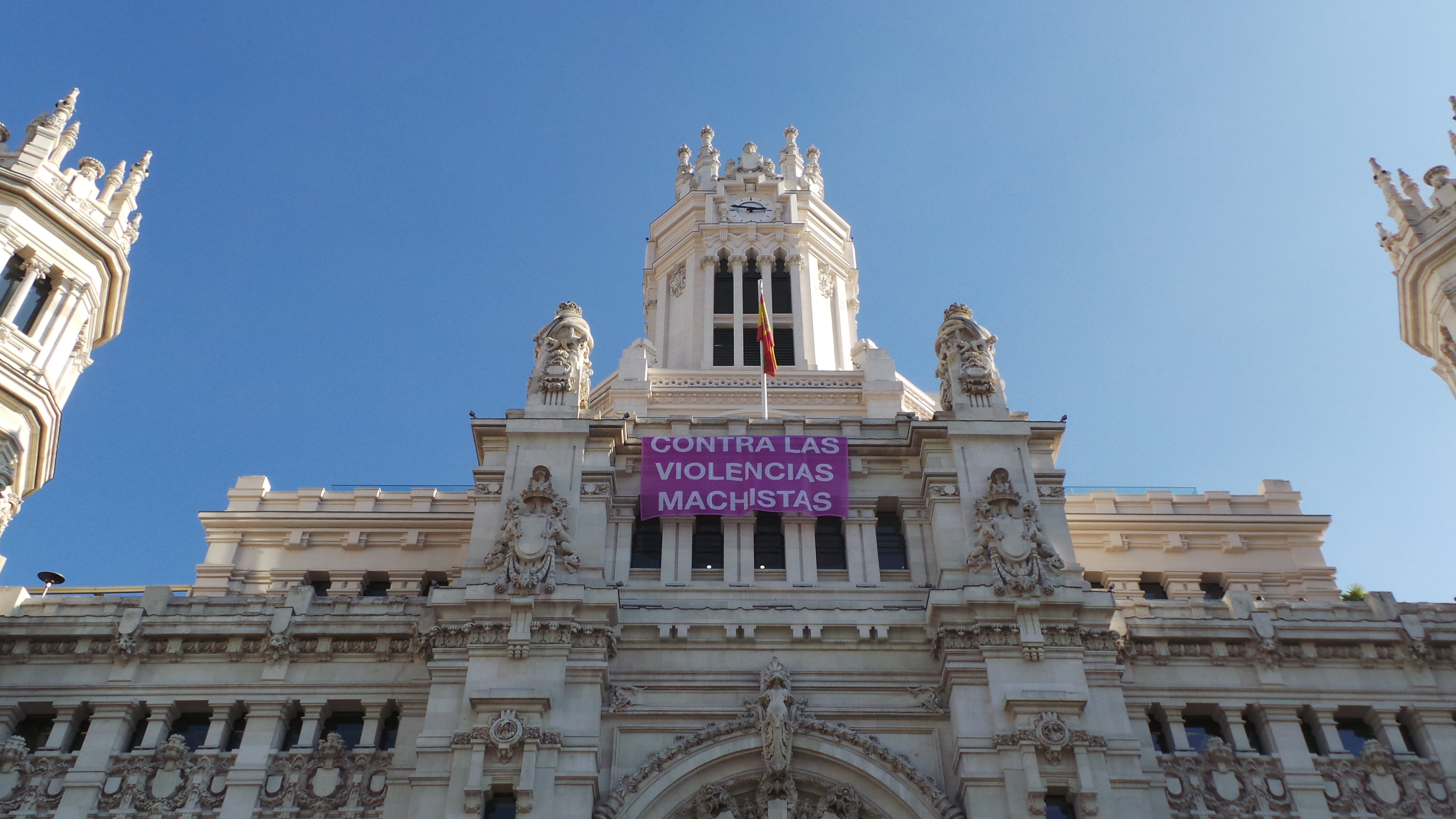
- Madrid Town Hall. 7N Banner. 135 district councils joined the 322 convening organisations and 298 bodies
- Date: 7 November 2015
- Location: Madrid
- Caused by: Gender violence, machista terrorism, patriarchal violence
- Methods: National March

Spain's National March in Opposition to Male Violence(s) Against Women, also known as 7N, was a mass citizen mobilisation, convened as a "feminist movement", which came to occupy the centre of Madrid on 7 November 2015. Organised by three hundred and thirty-two feminist organisations, it had the support of two hundred and twenty-two bodies, including political parties, unions and national and international feminist organisations, as well as one hundred and thirty-five district councils. The final event consisted in the reading (in the various Languages of Spain) of a manifesto compiling the condemnations and demands of the organisations involved, negotiated over nine months through working committees.

After the March, a group of feminists who had participated in its planning decided to establish themselves permanently in what they called the "7N Feminist Platform in Opposition to Male Violence Against Women". The group's purpose was to introduce the demands raised in the manifesto into the political agenda and follow them up.

== Context ==
The 7N march came into being within the context of the gender-based murders committed over the course of 2015. During the summer months (June to September), male violence against women took the lives of 37 women and 8 minors. By the end of the year, 70 femicides were reported. The feminist movement was very active with a view to make the issue of gender violence, of which murders were the tip of the iceberg, more visible and to denounce what they considered an insufficient response by political powers. In that context, it was demanded that male violence against women be considered a State issue. The general budget cuts were also condemned and there was a call for all forms of violence against women to be taken into account, not only those exercised by a partner or ex-partner (as stipulated by the 1/2004 law).

=== Unified feminist platforms. ===
Prior to the mobilisation, unified platforms had been established in the various territories within Spain. They would take to the streets after every femicide to express their resistance and to demand specific measures. Furthermore, on agreed upon dates, demonstrations to cast light on male violence against women were being carried out frequently in many of these places, with slogans such as "They’re killing us", "We want to be alive", "Not one less" or "Not one more victim". For example: the so-called “lunes sin sol” (“sunless Mondays”) in León, the gatherings every third Monday of every month in Barcelona, the first Mondays in Valencia, every 25th day of the month in Madrid, Málaga, Valladolid, Burgos and Lanzarote. Likewise, every 25 November the International Day for the Elimination of Violence against Women is celebrated.

=== A state issue. ===
At these protests and gatherings, it was demanded, as a last resort, that male violence against women be considered a State issue. This was the case for the terrorist violence of ETA and proved effective in ending the problem. The argument for this was: compared to the 829 murders committed by ETA since 1960, gender-based murders of women since 1995 have reached the figure of 1378. At the end of 2015, 70 femicides were recorded.

=== General budget with a gender perspective. ===
On the other hand, feminist platforms such as Impacto de Género Ya (Gender Impact Now), have been carrying out analyses, from a gender perspective, of the State Budget since 2008. These were presented to parliamentary groups in Congress. Their assessment for 2015 exposed that since 2009, the year in which public service cuts began after the explosion of the 2008 economic crisis, budgeted resources assigned to the fight against gender violence had been cut by 23%, leaving the total amount at 23.7 million euros. Based on this data, the organising platforms considered this quantity insufficient for: attending to the victims; applying the prevention and protection measures provided by the 1/2004 framework law against gender violence, and; implementing the Istanbul Convention signed by Spain in 2014 and the UN recommendations for the Spanish government in the CEDAW framework.

=== Male violence(s) against women. ===
The 1/2004 Gender Violence law provides for violence exercised by "those who are or have been their spouse or those who have been linked to the woman by similar emotional relationships, even without cohabiting". Despite the advances that this law entailed, it did not include other forms of violence which are exercised against women qua women. The real dimension of the problem remained invisible and without resources to fight it. With the backing of the Istanbul Agreement, which had been ratified by Spain, feminist organisations demanded the extension of the treaty to cover all forms of violence and they emphasised using the plural "violences" in "violencias machistas".

In this context, the feminist Co-ordinator of Valencia proposed a unified, national mobilisation to demand the implementation of specific measures to deal with the phenomenon entirely and effectively. The final objective was to have these male violence(s) against women (conceptualised as "misogynist terrorism") treated as a "State issue". This meant that the measures to be adopted could not be isolated, partisan pacts, but instead they would require cross-party discussion and the inclusion of society in its entirety, under the leadership of the State which would provision all the necessary means. It was also demanded that the feminist organisations, with all their knowledge and experience, be included in the design of a strategy. At first, the proposal was launched through social media. Later, it was raised at an in-person meeting in Madrid which brought together (also via social media) feminist bodies from all regions of the Spanish territory. From here, agreements were reached and the idea started to take form for it to become a reality months later.

== Organisation ==
The first general logistics meeting for the organisation of the National March in Opposition to Male Violence(s) Towards Women (7N) took place on 28 February 2015. Three more followed this on 4 July 12 September and 17 October. A total of four general assemblies took place in Madrid, as well as an indeterminate number of coordination meetings in each territory. The organising process lasted nearly nine months and was developed through four working committees. At the general assembly meetings, key points were agreed upon such as the date of the mobilisation. Finally, the 7 November was agreed due to its proximity to the general election scheduled for 20 December. The slogan would be ‘National March in Opposition to Male Violence(s) Towards Women (7N)’ and the protest would be held under the unified denomination of "feminist movement". Additionally, the contents and terminology of the manifesto were also agreed upon at these meetings. Everything, slogans and manifesto, as well as the reading, took shape in the languages belonging to the various regions and identities within Spain. Likewise, the leading banner was also carried by people who represented the various regions.

=== The manifesto and its demands ===
The citizen mobilisation was organised and convened by the autonomous feminist movement, even though it was open to support from political parties and unions, as long as they agreed to respect the leading role of the women and the feminist movement. The manifesto was the result of a collective effort led by a commission established for that very purpose. The final text uses terminology such as "State issue", "male violence(s) against women", "misogynist terrorism", "patriarchal violence" and "Femicides". With these expressions, the feminist movement referred to ideas and concepts linked to violence such as "violence against women qua women"; "violence that is not only confined to the boundaries of the partner or ex-partner, but rather to many other forms and these violences must be treated as terrorism and, as such, as a State issue".

The manifesto begins with the phrase “the feminist movement denounces…” and ends with “We want to be alive!!! Enough already!!!” and the signature of the “feminist movement”. It includes a total of nine demands, formulated as requirements, which appeal first to the State but also to “each person, each institution, each political party, [and] each government to not be accomplices to this barbarism”.

Specifically, the requirements are as follows:
1. That the fight against misogynist terrorism be a State matter.
2. That the Istanbul Convention be developed and implemented and the CEDAW recommendations fulfilled, and that the 1/2004 law be reformed to reflect all forms of violence against women.
3. That all of society and its organisations and institutions be committed to this fight.
4. That the fight and its resources cover violence committed by a partner or ex-partner, as well as sexual assaults, sexual abuse in work environments, the trade of sexual exploitation/slave labour of women and children, and all forms of male violence against women.
5. That all government authorities truly commit to the prevention and eradication of male violence(s) towards women, as well as to the support and reparation of all women in situations of violence, independently of the administrative situation in which these women may be.
6. That an emphasis be put on protecting the affected women, facilitating routes which entail a real social, economic and life recovery for them and their sons and daughters.
7. That prevention be a prioritised policy which includes a coeducational system at all levels – the media, cultural production and civil society, including specific training for all professional personnel involved in the processes, in the fight against gender violence.
8. That the media commit to an adequate treatment of the different forms of male violence towards women, making them visible, avoiding morbid sensationalism and utilising non-sexist language and images.
9. The elimination of imposed joint custody and the visitation schedule for minors of convicted abusers. The withdrawal and non-transfer of parental authority from the abusers.

— 7N Platform, https://plataforma7n.files.wordpress.com/2017/01/manifiesto-7n-07-11-15-544-firmas-1.pdf

==== The manifesto in the subcommittee of the Spanish Congress of Deputies ====
The points of the manifesto were the base upon which, one year later (15 November 2016), the Subcommittee formed in the Congress of Deputies would elaborate a report with specific proposals to advance the eradication of the different forms of violence against women. On 28 September 2017, the Congress of Deputies passed a State Pact, with 178 votes in favour and 65 abstentions, including 214 measures and a budget of 1,000 million euros to put a stop to gender violence over the course of five years. On 14 March 2018, the 7N Platform denounced the fact that six months after the signing of the bill, the budget allocation for the first year still had not taken effect and neither had any of the measures included in the State Pact.

=== Development of the march ===
The march began opposite the Ministry of Health, Social Services and Equality at Paseo del Prado at 12 noon on 7 November 2015. The planned route was: Paseo del Prado - Plaza de Cibeles – Gran Vía – Plaza de España. With Hashtags such as #7N, #TerrorismoMachista (Misogynist Terrorism) and #CuestiónEstado (State Issue), the event was widely publicised through social media and so, two days before, informative press conferences were held in the various regions which many media bodies attended. On the day of the demonstration, many of these media outlets dubbed it "a mass and historic march that takes Madrid" and some landed on an approximate figure of 200,000 participants. Demonstrators came from all parts of the Spanish territory, including 322 convening organisations (36 national and 286 autonomous/local) as well as 298 entities, ranging from national and international feminist associations to political parties and unions, who all showed their support at the protest. Also, motions of support were received from 135 district councils. At the end of the route, in the crowded Plaza de España, the reading of the manifesto took place in all the languages belonging to the various identities within the State. These included the official and non-official (such as Asturian and Caló) languages.

== 7N feminist platform in opposition to male violence(s) against women ==
On 12 December 2015, after the demonstration was held, a general assembly was carried out in Madrid to evaluate the 7N day. The start of 2016, with eleven women and one girl murdered, had been the worst beginning to any year within the last decade and the institutional response continued to dissatisfy the feminist organisations. It is in this context, also in Madrid, that the second meeting after the March was held on 30 January 2016. There it was determined to capitalise on the collaborative experience and synergy gained from the organisation of the National March to achieve results in citizen mobilisation and advocacy so that male violence(s) against women would indeed be considered a State issue. Under this premise, at the same meeting, it was decided to continue as a collective under the permanent organisational model of a platform, called the "7N Feminist Platform in Opposition to Male Violence(s) Against Women".

The main purpose of the recently created Platform was to become a bridging national and regional baseline structure, open to new incorporations, for everything related to male violence against women. It aimed to follow up on the demands laid out in the manifesto created for the 2015 March, as well as advocating, condemning, supporting the victims, raising awareness and mobilising citizens. It was proposed to continue with its horizontal organisation, developed through working committees. In this way, participation and transparency was enabled, as well as the rotation of spokesperson's office. Likewise, it was proposed that the platform serve as an amplifier for the actions that could be carried out in any region.

Some of the main acts undertaken by the 7N Platform were:

- A gathering for the first anniversary of the National March in Opposition to Male Violence(s) Against Women (7/11/2016): With the slogan “No to sexual assault”, the Platform organised a gathering that included a performance opposite the Prado Museum of Madrid and the Ministry of Health, Social Services and Equality, and a round table to condemn the fact that misogynist terrorism, a year after the mass March, was yet to be considered a State issue.
- A session in the Spanish Congress of Deputies (24 February 2016): With the title “Political and institutional commitment against violence towards women” and the #YoVoy24F hashtag, the 7N Platform organised a session in the Ernest Lluch del Congreso chamber with the attendance of more than 200 people, comprising 60 feminist organisations and women belonging to 19 regions of the Spanish territory. All the spokespeople of the main parliamentary groups were invited. On the one hand, the objective was to understand the position of the groups within the subcommittee approved unanimously by Congress on 15 November 2016 to work on a State Pact Against Gender Violence, but also for these representatives to learn the proposals of the 7N Platform. Of the seven parliamentary groups invited, only four were represented (PSOE, Unidos Podemos-En Comú Podem-En Marea, Esquerra Republicana and the Mixed Group) whilst the other three (PP, Ciudadanos and EAJ-PNV) were not present, neither did they excuse their absence.
- A Tribunal of Women Against Gender Violence in the Congress of Deputies (03/11/2017). In the context of the State Pact in Opposition to Male Violence Against Women passed in the Plenary of Congress in September 2017 and in commemoration of the second anniversary of the National March in Opposition to Male Violence(s) Against Women, the 7N Platform organised an activity with the objective of depicting the existence of these forms of violence as a violation of human rights. The platform sought to demonstrate the impunity of male violence against women, denouncing the State and its institutions as being directly responsible by failing to comply with its duty to prevent them. This action involved simulating the development of a trial, presenting real current cases such as those of Juana Rivas and Ángeles Gónzalez Carreño and relating a fictitious account of gang rape from the victim's view point.
