= Case of Juana Rivas =

International court case

- Started: May 18, 2016
- Decided: July 27, 2018

Keywords
- Child abduction, parental alienation, parental child abduction

The case of Juana Rivas is a judicial dispute between Juana Rivas and her then partner, Francesco Arcuri. The case involved judges from Spain and Italy, as Rivas resided in the city of Granada, in Andalusia, while Arcuri did so in Italy.

It gained a notable political and journalistic repercussion because it involved a case of gender violence by Arcuri against Juana Rivas, at the same time that she was convicted of child abduction due to her refusal to allow the children to return to Italy with their father. Media in Spain offered wide coverage of the case, generally in positions favorable to those of Juana Rivas. At the same time, successive demonstrations took place in Spain in support of the mother, under feminist slogans backed by personalities and political parties.

The first judicial order was in December 2016, forcing Juana Rivas to hand over her children to their habitual residence in Italy, which was ratified by the Granada Court in April 2017. In July of that same year, a new date was set for the delivery of the children, which happened in August, when they returned to Italy, where they remained thereafter after a search and arrest warrant was issued against Rivas. In July 2018, Juana Rivas was sentenced to five years in prison and payment of compensation.

== Context ==
=== Previous complaints ===
Juana Rivas and Francisco Arcuri met in 2004 in London and they dated for three years, with Arcuri moving to Spain.

In 2009, Rivas and Arcuri had a domestic dispute where Juana Rivas suffered from hand damage, filing a complaint for abuse against Arcuri. Arcuri also accused Rivas of abuse, as he had injuries to his thigh and neck. Both reached an agreement in which Arcuri admitted to criminal causes causing injury, and he was sentenced to three months in prison and a restraining order of one year and three months. He later said he regretted this agreement.

Arcuri would not enter prison and, after a year of separation and in breach of the restraining order, Rivas and Arcuri started living together again in the small town of Carloforte, on the island of San Pietro, in Sardinia, where they had a second child.

=== Case of Juana Rivas ===
In May 2016, Rivas left Carloforte and went to Maracena, a town in Granada, with her two children under the pretext of seeing her family. According to her, the trigger for this decision would have been "the daily situation of oppression, isolation and mistreatment for more than two years". Rivas would have deceived Arcuri by claiming to be ill and unable to return on the scheduled date.

In July 2016, Rivas filed the first complaint with the Maracena Civil Guard for alleged physical and psychological abuse inflicted by Arcuri, but it was dismissed.

In December 2016, Rivas again issued a complaint against her partner for abuse, this time adding that her eldest son was also a victim of this. At the same time, on December 14, a court of Granada ordered Rivas to make the "immediate restitution" of the children with their father back to Italy, a resolution that became final in April 2017, after Arcuri issued and obtained the guardianship and custody of minors from the Court of Cagliari in June 2017.

From then on, the media significance of the Juana Rivas court case increased. Rivas obtained 150,000 signatures petitioning that her children not be sent to Italy. After several months, in April 2017 the Court dismissed Rivas's appeal and again ordered the "immediate restitution" to Italy, ordering the delivery of the minors on July 26. On July 26, Rivas went into hiding with her children.

Under the hashtag «#juanaestaenmicasa», ("#juanaisinmyhouse") there was a great wave of demonstrations throughout Spain in support of Rivas. With her decision to evade justice, Rivas received the support of the highest Andalusian political authorities, including that of the president Susana Díaz and the leader of the Podemos party, Teresa Rodríguez.

Rivas did not attend the new court summons and was detained on August 22, 2017. On August 28, Rivas willingly gave the children up to Arcuri, who took them to Italy. On July 27, 2018, Rivas was sentenced to five years in prison, six years of disqualification from exercising parental authority, 30,000 euros of compensation to her ex-partner and the payment of legal costs. The judge estimated that Rivas committed two crimes of abduction of minors, finding no mitigation in the complaints of abuse as he had not obtained the veracity of any of them. In 2019, the Italian Prosecutor's Office filed the eight complaints of mistreatment that Rivas made against Arcuri between 2016 and 2018, stating that "the narration of the extraordinary violence is absolutely implausible." The court ruling dictated that Rivas used her children as "human shields", whom she would have "psychologically manipulated to oppose their father" by reporting episodes of abuse by Arcuri of her children that she would not have been able to prove.

=== After the sentence ===
In October 2018, Rivas decided to no longer use the services of the lawyer who had been her legal counsel for the entire case, José Estanislao López. That same month, Rivas again failed to deliver the children to Arcuri, taking refuge in a friend's house near Cagliari and arguing that she would only return them when a judge forces her. López said that Rivas' current defense team, specifically Francisca Granados and the Maracena Women's Center, who were guiding Rivas' actions, including those that were illegal.

In April 2021, the Supreme Court reduced the sentence to two and a half years in prison, confirming the penalty of six years of withdrawal of parental authority and the payment of compensation of 12,000 euros for the moral and material damage caused to the father of the minors.

Rivas entered an intake center on June 11, 2021 to begin her prison sentence. On June 15, 2021, she left the center to serve her sentence at home with an electronic monitoring bracelet, as the General Secretariat of Penitentiary Institutions applied article 86.4 of the Penitentiary Regulations.

In the Council of Ministers held on November 16, 2021, Rivas was granted a partial pardon, so her sentence was reduced to a prison term of one year and three months. Also, the penalty of disqualification from exercising parental authority was changed to a penalty of 180 days of community service.

In March 2022, the Court of Granada suspended her prison sentence on the condition that she must not commit a new crime for a period of three years and that she participate in positive parenting programs.
