= Pablo Echenique =

Spanish politician (born 1978)

The Most Excellent Pablo Echenique MP
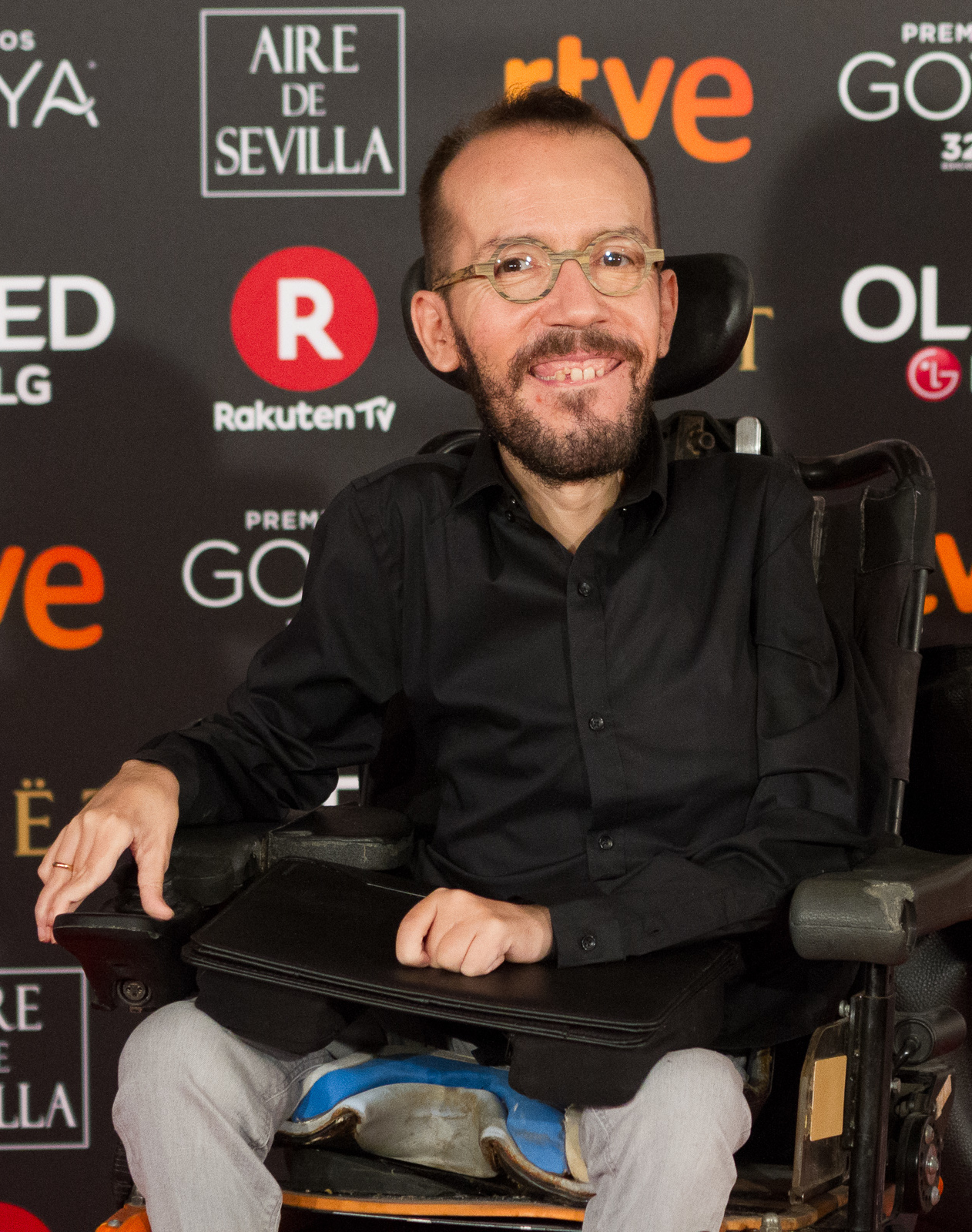
- Pablo Echenique Robba in 2018.

Member of the Congress of Deputies
- In office 21 May 2019 – 17 August 2023
- Constituency: Zaragoza

Member of the Aragonese Corts
- In office 18 June 2015 – 13 September 2017
- Constituency: Zaragoza

Member of the European Parliament
- In office 1 July 2014 – 14 March 2015
- Constituency: Spain

Personal details
- Born: Pablo Echenique Robba; 28 August 1978 (age 48) Rosario, Argentina
- Party: Podemos (since 2014)
- Spouse: María Alejandra Nelo Bazán
- Education: Doctorate in Physics
- Alma mater: Universidad de Zaragoza
- Occupation: Physicist and politician

Pablo Echenique Robba (born 28 August 1978) is an Argentine-born Spanish physicist and politician. As a scientist, he holds a position at the Spanish National Research Council in Zaragoza (CSIC).

He came to Spain aged 13 to live in Zaragoza. He had Spinal muscular atrophy. Echenique was elected a member of the Congress of Deputies in the April 2019 Spanish general election along with the left-wing political party Podemos. Previously, Echenique was one of the five MEPs elected by Podemos in the 2014 European Parliament election, and was a member of the Aragonese Corts between 2015 and 2017.

In October 2020, he was fined €11,040 for the irregular employment of his assistant. In November 2020, he was fined €80,000 for saying that a man who was murdered in 1985 was a rapist. The Supreme Court subsequently annulled this conviction after concluding that he did not make a direct accusation against the plaintiff's brother, but rather expressed a show of solidarity with his political colleague.
